= Maryland Route 778 =

State highway in Maryland, United States

Maryland Route 778
- Old Solomons Island Road

Route information
- Maintained by MDSHA
- Length: 2.12 mi (3.41 km)
- Existed: 1965–present

Major junctions
- South end: MD 2 near Owings
- MD 260 in Owings
- North end: MD 261 at Friendship

Location
- Country: United States
- State: Maryland
- Counties: Calvert, Anne Arundel

Highway system
- Maryland highway system; Interstate; US; State; Scenic Byways
← MD 776	→ MD 779

Maryland Route 778 (MD 778) is a state highway in the U.S. state of Maryland. Known as Old Solomons Island Road, the state highway runs 2.12 miles (3.41 km) from MD 2 near Owings north to MD 261 at Friendship. MD 778 and its unsigned auxiliary routes are segments of the old alignment of MD 2 in far northern Calvert County and southern Anne Arundel County. MD 2 was originally constructed as one of the original state roads in the early to mid-1910s. The state highway from Edgewater south to Owings was reconstructed in stages from the early 1950s to the mid-1960s, when the Owings–Friendship portion of MD 2 was relocated. As portions of the old MD 2 were bypassed, they were designated segments of MD 778.

== Route description ==
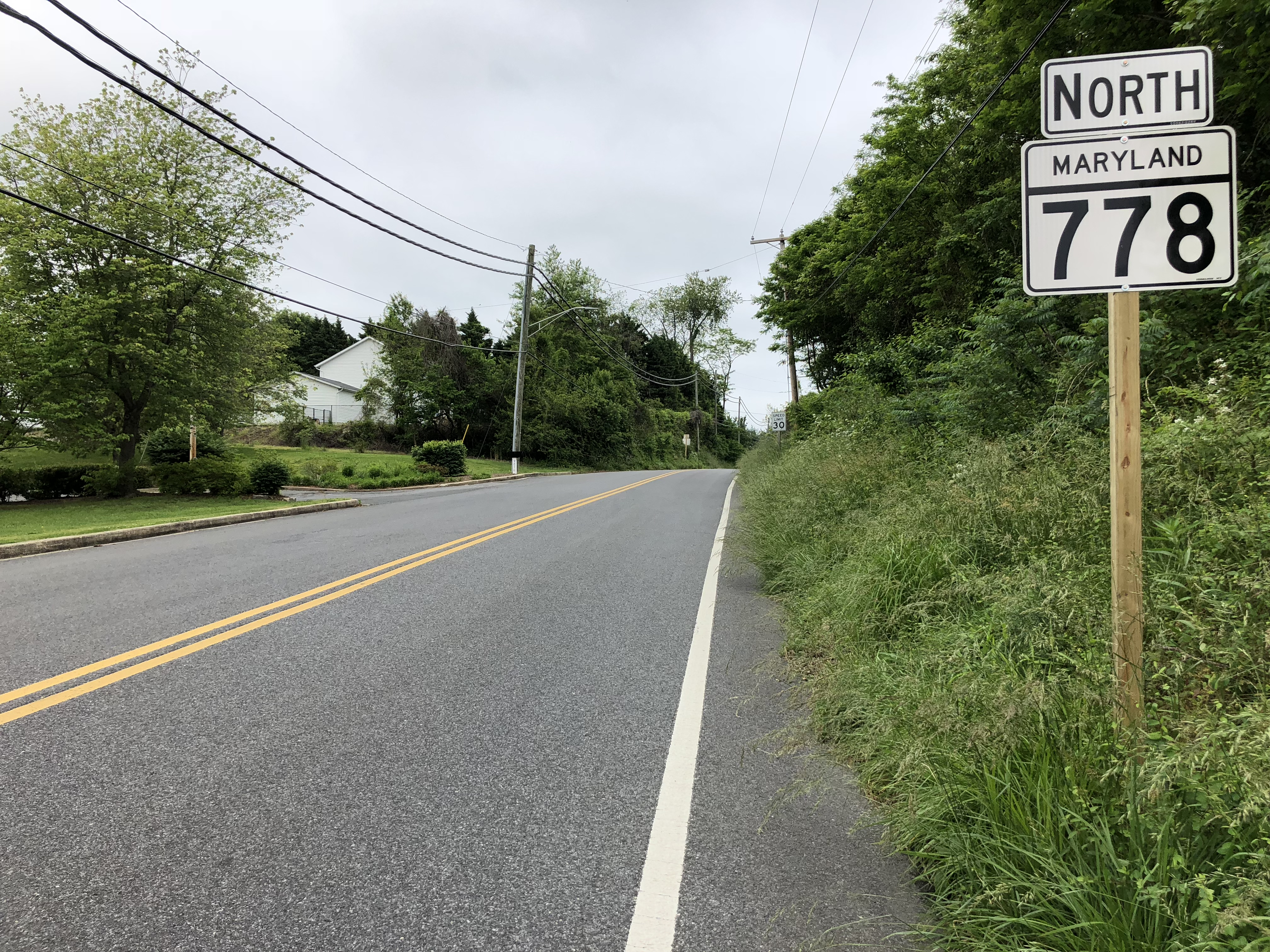
View north along MD 778 in Owings

MD 778 begins at an intersection with MD 2 (Solomons Island Road) south of Owings. The roadway continues on the other side of MD 2 as county-maintained Grovers Turn Road. MD 778 heads northeast as a two-lane undivided road and immediately intersects unmarked MD 765H, an unnamed old alignment of MD 2. The highway crosses over Hall Creek and meets MD 260 (Chesapeake Beach Road) in the village of Owings. Shortly after the intersection with MD 260, MD 778 crosses the Calvert–Anne Arundel county line. The state highway continues north through farmland to its northern terminus in the village of Friendship. From the northern terminus, MD 261 heads east as Friendship Road, a county-maintained portion of Friendship Road heads west toward MD 2, and Old Solomons Island Road continues north as a county highway toward a separate intersection with MD 2.

== History ==
Solomons Island Road, including the portion of the highway from south of Owings to south of Edgewater, was chosen as one of the original state roads to be developed by the Maryland State Roads Commission in 1909. The highway from south of Owings to Lothian (also known as Mount Zion) was graded and surfaced as a dirt road between 1910 and 1912. That road was later surfaced with gravel and had many of the more dangerous curves modified by 1921. Solomons Island Road from Lothian to Edgewater was built as a 14-foot (4.3 m) wide gravel road in 1915. When state highways were first assigned numbers in 1927, Solomons Island Road became the southern part of MD 2. By 1934, MD 2 had been expanded to a width of 16 to 18 feet (4.9 to 5.5 m) south of Edgewater.

MD 2 from Owings to Edgewater starting receiving its first major upgrades in the 1950s, including several relocations of the highway. The bypassed portions of MD 2 became segments of MD 778, with the letter suffix on the highway designation corresponding to the order the sections were bypassed. The highway from Edgewater south to Harwood (then known as Butlers) was widened and resurfaced with bituminous stabilized gravel in 1950 and 1951. MD 2 from Harwood south to Lothian was widened and resurfaced with bituminous stabilized gravel in 1952 and 1953. Old Solomons Island Road between Harwood Road and Polling House Road in Harwood remained part of the state highway system until 1987.

Improvements to MD 2 from MD 423 north of Friendship to MD 258 north of Tracys Landing began in 1957 and were completed by 1960. That highway was first paved with bituminous stabilized gravel and later a second stage of bituminous concrete. The segment of Old Solomons Island Road immediately to the north of MD 423 remained in the state highway system until 1963. That same year, work on expanding and relocating the highway from Lothian south to MD 258 was completed. The portion of the old highway immediately to the south of Nutwell Road, now named Old Ridge Path Road, remained in the state highway system until 1987. MD 778 through Owings and Friendship was designated in 1965 when MD 2 was relocated to the west of the two villages. By 1999, the portion of MD 778 north of MD 261 was transferred to Anne Arundel County to be maintained.

== Junction list ==
County	Location	mi	km	Destinations	Notes
Calvert	Owings	0.00	0.00	MD 2 (Solomons Island Road) / Grovers Turn Road west – Prince Frederick	Southern terminus
Calvert	Owings	0.61	0.98	MD 260 (Chesapeake Beach Road) – Chesapeake Beach, Upper Marlboro	
Anne Arundel	Friendship	2.12	3.41	MD 261 east (Friendship Road) / Friendship Road west / Old Solomons Island Road north – North Beach	Northern terminus
1.000 mi = 1.609 km; 1.000 km = 0.621 mi

== Auxiliary routes ==
Map of MD 778's auxiliary routes

There are ten unsigned auxiliary routes of MD 778. These ten highways, all named Old Solomons Island Road, are old alignments of MD 2 between Friendship and Harwood in southern Anne Arundel County.

- MD 778D is a 0.17-mile (0.27 km) loop located on the northbound side of MD 2 between MD 255 (Owensville Road) and Owensville Sudley Road south of Harwood. This highway was bypassed in 1953.
- MD 778E is a 0.24-mile (0.39 km) loop located on the southbound side of MD 2 between Lothian Elementary School and Southern Middle School in Lothian. The southern connection to MD 2 is provided by MD 778Q. This highway was bypassed in 1953.
- MD 778F is a 0.48-mile (0.77 km) loop located on the southbound side of MD 2 in Tracys Landing, with termini on either side of MD 2's intersection with MD 256 (Deale Road). This highway was bypassed between 1957 and 1960.
- MD 778G is a 0.20-mile (0.32 km) loop located on the northbound side of MD 2 immediately to the south of MD 778F in Tracys Landing. This highway was bypassed between 1957 and 1960.
- MD 778I is a 0.08-mile (0.13 km) spur located on the northbound side of MD 2 south of Harwood. The road begins at Owensville Sudley Road and heads southeast to a dead end.
- MD 778J is a 0.95-mile (1.53 km) loop and spur located on the northbound side of MD 2 north of Nutwell Road between Tracys Landing and Lothian. There is a connection between MD 2 and MD 778J a short distance south of the northern terminus. This segment of Old Solomons Island Road was bypassed in 1963.
- MD 778L is a 0.09-mile (0.14 km) spur located on the southbound side of MD 2 north of Tracys Landing. The highway heads south from Portland Manor Farm Drive to a dead end. This segment of Old Solomons Island Road was bypassed in 1963.
- MD 778M is a 0.05-mile (0.080 km) spur located on the northbound side of MD 2 north of the MD 258 intersection north of Tracys Landing. This segment of Old Solomons Island Road was bypassed in 1963.
- MD 778N is a 0.18-mile (0.29 km) loop located on the southbound side of MD 2 between MD 423 and mainline MD 778 near Friendship. This segment of Old Solomons Island Road was bypassed in 1965.
- MD 778Q is a 0.02-mile (0.032 km) connector between MD 2 and MD 778E in Lothian.
