= Severna Park (disambiguation) =

Severna Park is a census-designated place in Maryland, United States.

Severna Park can also refer to:

- Severna Park (writer), an American science-fiction author
- Severna Park Mall
- Severna Park High School
- Severna Park Elementary School and Severna Park Middle School, Anne Arundel County Public Schools
