= Maryland Route 260 =

State highway in Maryland, United States

Maryland Route 260
- Chesapeake Beach Road
- Maryland Route 260 highlighted in red

Route information
- Maintained by MDSHA
- Length: 8.51 mi (13.70 km)
- Existed: 1956–present

Major junctions
- West end: MD 4 at Lyons Creek
- MD 2 in Owings; MD 778 in Owings
- East end: MD 261 in Chesapeake Beach

Location
- Country: United States
- State: Maryland
- Counties: Calvert, Anne Arundel

Highway system
- Maryland highway system; Interstate; US; State; Scenic Byways
| ← MD 259 | → MD 261 |

Maryland Route 260 (MD 260) is a state highway in the U.S. state of Maryland. Known as Chesapeake Beach Road, the highway runs 8.51 miles (13.70 km) from MD 4 at Lyons Creek east to MD 261 in Chesapeake Beach. MD 260 connects the twin towns of Chesapeake Beach and North Beach in northern Calvert County with highways to Upper Marlboro, Washington, Annapolis, and Baltimore. Much of the highway follows part of the course of the former Chesapeake Beach Railway, which ended service in the mid-1930s. MD 260 was constructed in the early 1920s from MD 2 south of Owings east to Chesapeake Beach. The highway was extended west to what is now MD 4 south of Dunkirk in the early 1930s. MD 260 was relocated to a road built on the railroad right-of-way from Lyons Creek through Owings in the mid-1950s.

== Route description ==
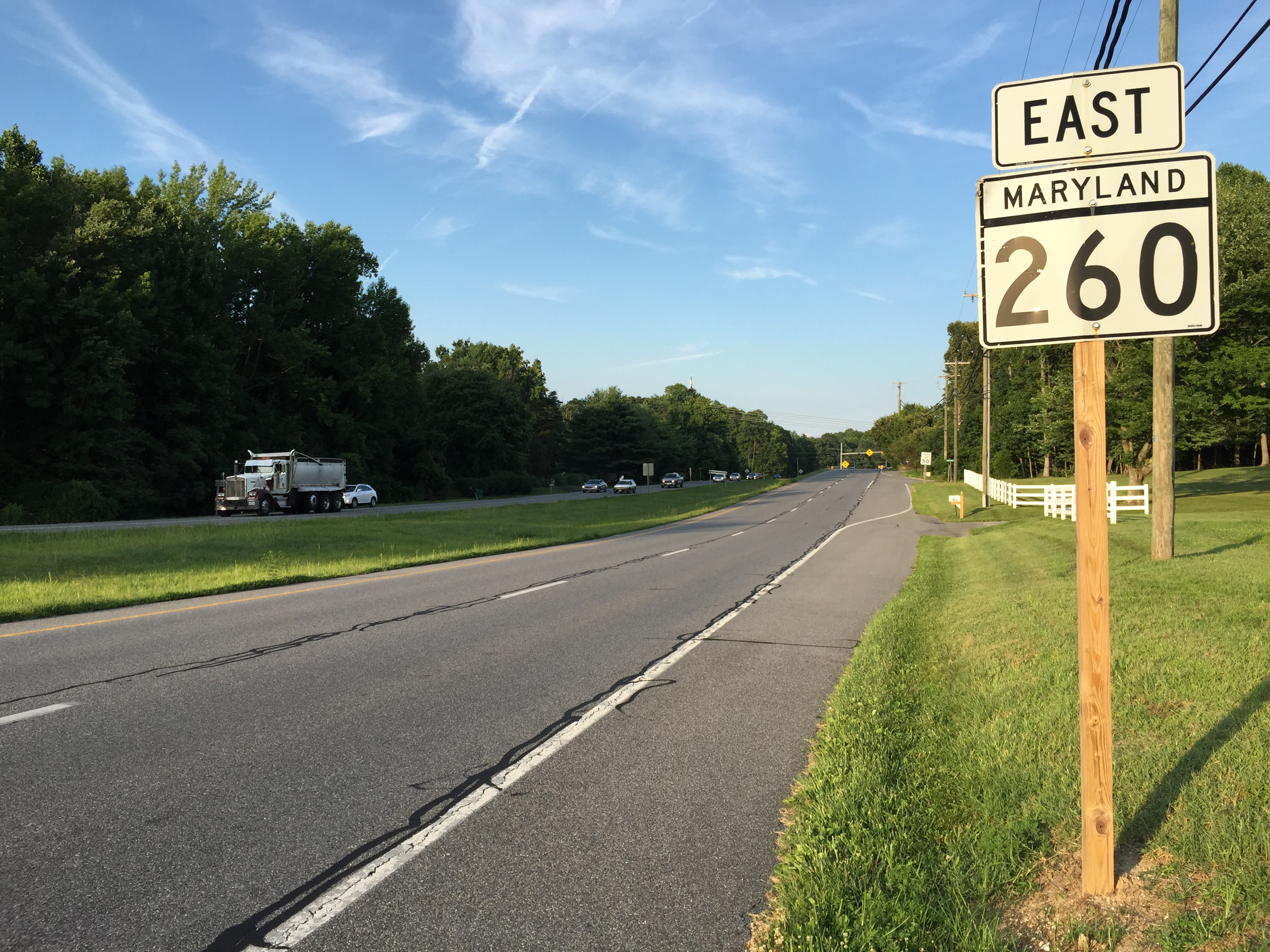
View east along MD 260 in Owings

MD 260 begins at a partial trumpet interchange with MD 4 (Southern Maryland Boulevard) at Lyons Creek, which forms part of the Calvert–Anne Arundel county border. There is no access from westbound MD 260 to southbound MD 4; that movement is made by following northbound MD 4 into Anne Arundel County and making a U-turn at the Lower Pindell Road intersection. MD 260 heads southeast as a two-lane undivided road on a straight path for almost 6 miles (9.7 km). The highway crosses a pair of tributaries of Hall Creek, running north of the historic home Maidstone and passing through the southwestern corner of Anne Arundel County. Immediately after re-entering Calvert County, MD 260 temporarily expands to four lanes for its intersection with MD 2 (Solomons Island Road). The highway continues through Owings, where the highway intersects MD 778 (Old Solomons Island Road). Southeast of Owings, MD 260 crosses Hall Creek.

MD 260's heading shifts from southeast to east where it meets Mount Harmony Road at a trumpet interchange in the hamlet of Paris. A few houses and small businesses are situated within this interchange. Mount Harmony Road, which has a bridge over eastbound MD 260 and the ramp from Mount Harmony Road to westbound MD 260, is unsigned MD 260D within the interchange. East of the interchange at Lafayette Drive, the state highway becomes a four-lane divided highway, and the median becomes wide and forested just east of the Boyds Turn Road-Horace Ward Road intersection. The median narrows as MD 260 enters the town of Chesapeake Beach and ends as the highway transitions to a two-lane road with a center left-turn lane at G Street. The highway continues four blocks to its eastern terminus at MD 261 (Bayside Road) just west of the Chesapeake Bay shoreline and several blocks north of Fishing Creek and the Chesapeake Beach Railway Station.

The section of the median between the Harrison Boulevard-Limerick Lane intersection and the G Street-Cox Road intersection is decorated with many Christmas light displays by the Town of Chesapeake Beach during the holiday season.

== History ==
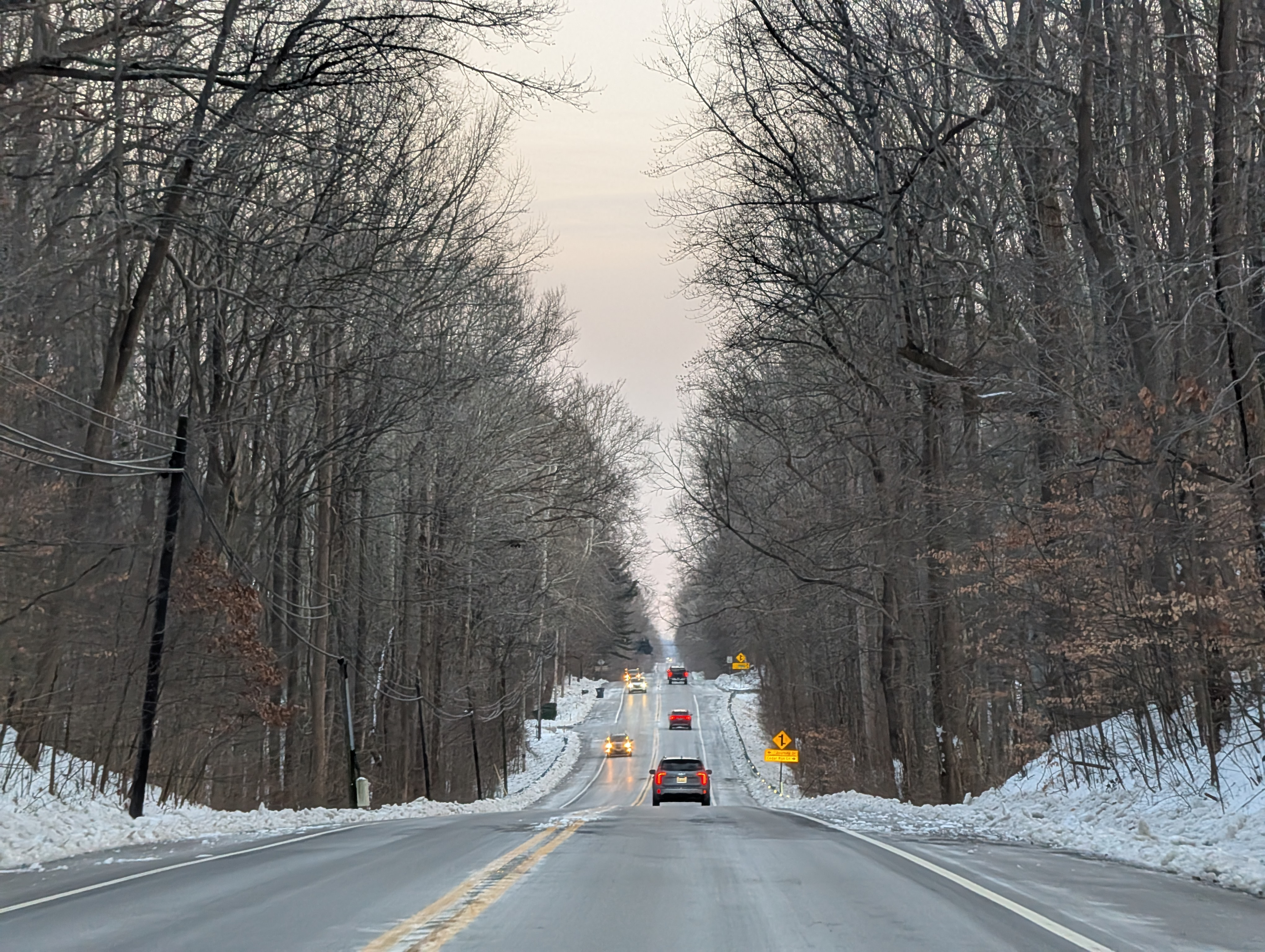
Looking southeast during winter

The Chesapeake Beach Railway was constructed from Washington southeast through Upper Marlboro to the newly constructed resort town of Chesapeake Beach between 1897 and 1900. The railroad followed the path of modern MD 260 from Lyons Creek to Mount Harmony Road on the way to its eastern terminus at the Chesapeake Beach Railway Station on the south side of the mouth of Fishing Creek. The first improved road connection to the resort was built as a gravel road. The road was completed from MD 2 (now MD 765I) at Mount Harmony to about 1 mile (1.6 km) west of the beach by 1921. Chesapeake Beach Road was completed to the beach by 1923. Construction on a graveled westward extension of MD 260 to Southern Maryland Boulevard, which was then MD 416, south of Dunkirk was started in 1930 and completed by 1933.

The first major upgrade of MD 260 occurred in 1934 when the highway was relocated to a straighter path, bypassing what is now Horace Ward Road, and paved and widened to 20 feet (6.1 m) from the west end of the relocation at Boyds Turn Road to MD 261 in Chesapeake Beach. The highway's original one-lane timber bridge over the Chesapeake Beach Railway at Paris was replaced with a wider concrete bridge between 1934 and 1936. This bridge was built contemporaneously with the end of passenger service on the Chesapeake Beach Railway in 1935. The remainder of MD 260 from MD 416 to Paris was proposed to be expanded from 16 to 20 feet (4.9 to 6.1 m) in width from MD 416 to Paris as early as 1934 and again in 1940.

The first road to be built along the abandoned Chesapeake Beach Railway was a county highway constructed by the Maryland State Roads Commission in 1946 from Owings to MD 260 at Paris that included a timber bridge over Hall Creek. This segment of highway was reconstructed as a 24-foot (7.3 m) wide road surfaced with bituminous stabilized gravel in 1951. Work on the remainder of the highway from Lyons Creek to Owings began in 1952 and the new bituminous stabilized gravel highway was completed in 1954. The new highway was repaved with bituminous concrete in 1956. The new Chesapeake Beach Road was designated MD 751 by 1955 but was changed to a rerouting of MD 260 to its present course in 1956, at which time Mount Harmony Road was removed from the state highway system. MD 260 was expanded to a four-lane divided highway from Mount Harmony Road east to G Street in Chesapeake Beach in 1960. As part of this project, the highway was relocated from what is now Cox Road on the edge of Chesapeake Beach. MD 260's intersection at MD 4 was replaced with an interchange in 2002 and 2003.

== Junction list ==
| County | Location | mi | km | Destinations | Notes |
|---|---|---|---|---|---|
| Calvert | Lyons Creek | 0.00 | 0.00 | MD 4 north (Southern Maryland Boulevard) – Prince Frederick, Washington | Western terminus; trumpet interchange with no access from westbound MD 260 to southbound MD 4 |
| Anne Arundel | No major junctions | | | | |
| Calvert | Owings | 3.94 | 6.34 | MD 2 (Solomons Island Road) – Annapolis, Prince Frederick, Solomons Island | |
| Calvert | Owings | 4.20 | 6.76 | MD 778 (Old Solomons Island Road) | |
| Calvert | | 5.85 | 9.41 | Mount Harmony Road west | Trumpet interchange; Mount Harmony Road within interchange is MD 260D |
| Calvert | Chesapeake Beach | 8.51 | 13.70 | MD 261 (Bayside Road) – North Beach, Breezy Point | Eastern terminus |
1.000 mi = 1.609 km; 1.000 km = 0.621 mi: Incomplete access

== Auxiliary routes ==
MD 260 has one existing auxiliary route and three former auxiliary routes.

- MD 260A was the designation for the 0.12-mile (0.19 km) one-lane ramp from what is now the western terminus of MD 260 to a merge with northbound MD 4 just south of Lyons Creek. MD 260A was officially changed to a ramp designation in 2003 after the MD 4–MD 260 interchange was completed.
- MD 260B was the designation for the 0.03-mile (0.048 km) connecting roadway running west from MD 260 to MD 4 that allowed access from westbound MD 260 to southbound MD 4. This roadway was removed as part of the construction of the overpass carrying southbound MD 4 traffic to MD 260 in 2002.
- MD 260C was the designation for the 0.03-mile (0.048 km) ramp from northbound MD 4 to MD 260 just south of MD 260B. Like MD 260B, MD 260C was removed for the construction of the overpass at the interchange in 2002 and replaced with a more sweeping ramp to the south.
- MD 260D is the designation for the 0.23-mile (0.37 km) portion of Mount Harmony Road through that highway's trumpet interchange with MD 260 between Owings and Chesapeake Beach.
