= Arundel Gardens, Maryland =

Unincorporated community in Maryland, United States

- Unincorporated community
- Location within Maryland
- Coordinates: 39°12′45″N 76°37′08″W
- Country: United States
- State: Maryland
- County: Anne Arundel
- Elevation: 157 ft (48 m)
- Time zone: UTC−5 (Eastern (EST))
  - Summer (DST): UTC−4 (EDT)
- Area codes: 410 & 443
- GNIS feature ID: 589658

Arundel Gardens is an unincorporated community in Anne Arundel County, Maryland, United States. Arundel Gardens is located along Maryland Route 2 north of Interstate 695, in the southern part of the Brooklyn Park census-designated place.
