= Maryland Route 2 =

State highway in Maryland, US

Maryland Route 2

Route information
- Maintained by MDSHA, Baltimore DOT
- Length: 79.24 mi (127.52 km)
- Existed: 1927–present
- Tourist routes: Star-Spangled Banner Scenic Byway; Roots and Tides Scenic Byway; National Historic Seaport Scenic Byway

Major junctions
- South end: MD 4 / MD 765 near Solomons
- MD 231 in Prince Frederick; MD 4 near Sunderland; I-595 / US 50 / US 301 near Annapolis; MD 10 near Pasadena; MD 100 near Pasadena; I-695 in Glen Burnie; I-895 Toll in Baltimore; I-95 in Baltimore; US 40 in Baltimore; I-83 in Baltimore
- North end: US 1 / US 40 Truck in Baltimore

Location
- Country: United States
- State: Maryland
- Counties: Calvert, Anne Arundel, City of Baltimore

Highway system
- Maryland highway system; Interstate; US; State; Scenic Byways
← US 1	→ MD 3

Maryland Route 2 (MD 2) is the longest state highway in the U.S. state of Maryland. The 79.24-mile (127.52 km) route runs from Solomons Island in Calvert County north to an intersection with U.S. Route 1 (US 1)/US 40 Truck (North Avenue) in Baltimore. The route runs concurrent with MD 4 through much of Calvert County along a four-lane divided highway known as Solomons Island Road, passing through rural areas as well as the communities of Lusby, Port Republic, Prince Frederick, and Huntingtown. In Sunderland, MD 2 splits from MD 4 and continues north as two-lane undivided Solomons Island Road into Anne Arundel County, still passing through rural areas. Upon reaching Annapolis, the route runs concurrent with US 50/US 301 to the north of the city. Between Annapolis and Baltimore, MD 2 runs along the Governor Ritchie Highway (also known as the Ritchie Highway), a multilane divided highway that heads through suburban areas, passing through Arnold, Severna Park, Pasadena, Glen Burnie, and Brooklyn Park. In Baltimore, the route heads north on city streets and passes through the downtown area of the city.

What became part of MD 2 was originally planned as two different state roads in 1909. The portion between Solomons and Annapolis was built as a gravel road called Solomons Island Road between 1910 and 1915. The portion of road between Annapolis and Glen Burnie was built as part of the Baltimore–Annapolis Boulevard, a road authorized in 1910 to connect Baltimore and Annapolis and was completed in 1924 with the construction of a bridge over the Severn River leading to Annapolis. A state road between Glen Burnie and Baltimore was completed in 1911. MD 2 was designated in 1927 between Solomons and Baltimore, using Solomons Island Road, streets through Annapolis, the Baltimore–Annapolis Boulevard, and the state road between Glen Burnie and Baltimore. MD 2 was marked up to US 1 in Baltimore in 1939. In the 1930s, MD 2 was realigned onto the four-lane Governor Ritchie Highway between Annapolis and Baltimore; the former routing along Baltimore–Annapolis Boulevard became MD 648. Ritchie Highway became a divided highway in 1950. Between the 1930s and the 1950s, several upgrades and realignments occurred to the portion of MD 2 between Solomons and Annapolis. MD 2 was realigned to bypass Annapolis on the US 50 freeway in 1955, with MD 450 replacing the route through Annapolis. The route between Solomons and Sunderland became concurrent with MD 416 in 1960, which was renumbered to MD 4 in 1965. Between the 1960s and the 1980s, MD 2/MD 4 between Solomons and Sunderland was widened into a divided highway, with the bypassed former alignments becoming multiple sections of MD 765. The Ritchie Highway portion of the route was originally the main route between Annapolis and Baltimore until Interstate 97 (I-97) was completed in the 1990s.

== Route description ==
MD 2 serves as a north–south route located a short distance to the west of the Chesapeake Bay in Calvert and Anne Arundel counties and in the city of Baltimore in Maryland. In Calvert County, the route runs through mostly rural areas, passing through the communities of Solomons Island, Lusby, Port Republic, Prince Frederick, Huntingtown, Sunderland, and Owings. Between Solomons Island and Sunderland, the route runs concurrent with MD 4. In Anne Arundel County, MD 2 runs through rural areas of the southern part of the county before reaching the Annapolis area, where it shares a concurrency with US 50/US 301 on the John Hanson Highway. From Annapolis, the route heads through suburban areas in the northern part of Anne Arundel County as the Ritchie Highway, passing through Arnold, Severna Park, Pasadena, Glen Burnie, and Brooklyn Park. It continues north into Baltimore, where it heads toward its terminus north of the downtown area. At 79.24 mi (127.52 km), it is the longest state highway in Maryland.

=== Calvert County ===
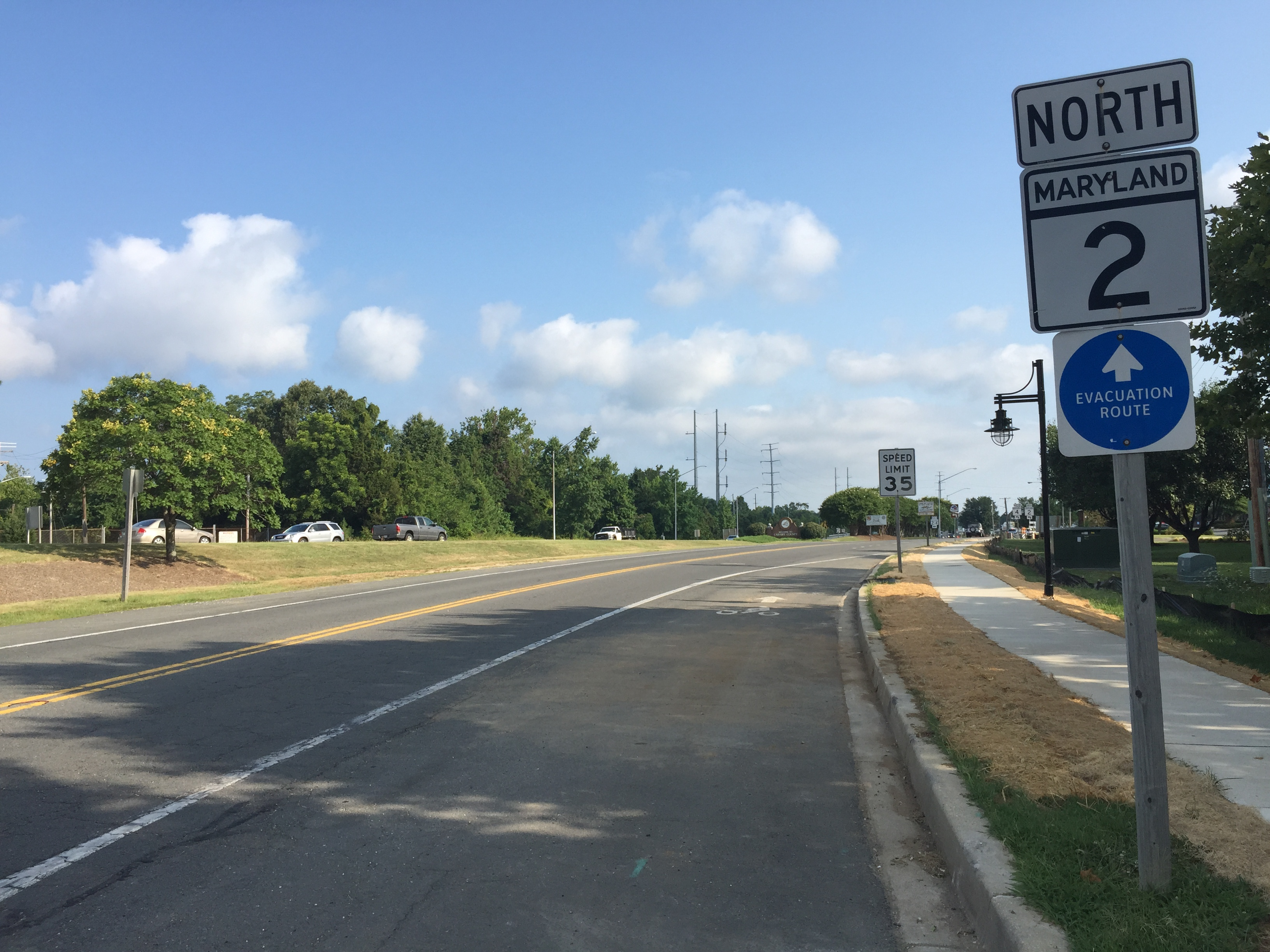
View north along MD 2 in Solomons, just before joining MD 4

Highway marker for MD 2/MD 4 concurrency

MD 2 heads north on Solomons Island Road, a two-lane undivided road in Solomons Island, Calvert County, from an intersection with Lore Road and an off-ramp from northbound MD 4 known as MD 2G. A short distance later, a portion of MD 765 called MD 765R continues north along Solomons Island Road, while MD 2 merges onto MD 4 at an interchange to form a concurrency with that route on a four-lane divided highway a short distance north of where MD 4 crosses the Patuxent River over the Governor Thomas Johnson Bridge. Upon merging with MD 4, the road continues north as Solomons Island Road, passing commercial areas to the east and a U.S. Navy Recreation Center to the west. It continues north-northeast into wooded areas, with MD 765 running a short distance to the east of the road. This portion of the road, also known as the Louis L. Goldstein Highway in honor of Louis L. Goldstein, a former Comptroller of Maryland, intersects with MD 760 (Rousby Hall Road). MD 2/MD 4 heads north to an intersection with MD 497 (Cove Point Road) and turns north-northwest, passing near Calvert Cliffs State Park.

MD 765 eventually crosses the route in Lusby and runs to the west of it as Pardoe Road, where it is officially called MD 765Q. MD 765 ends at the road a short distance to the north and emerges to the east of the road again as Nursery Road a short distance later. Solomons Island Road intersects MD 2N (Calvert Cliffs Parkway), which provides access to the Calvert Cliffs Nuclear Power Plant and another segment of MD 765 which runs to the west of the route on Saw Mill Road. MD 2/MD 4 turns to the west, intersecting MD 765 before turning north-northwest again with MD 765 running to the east of the route as St. Leonard Road through the community of St. Leonard. At the intersection with Ball Road/Calvert Beach Road in St. Leonard, the road passes east of a park and ride lot serving MTA Maryland commuter buses. MD 2/MD 4 continues through woodland with some residences and businesses, before turning west at a junction with the western terminus of MD 509 (Governor Run Road) into a mix of farmland and woodland, intersecting MD 264 (Broomes Island Road) and MD 765 again in Port Republic.

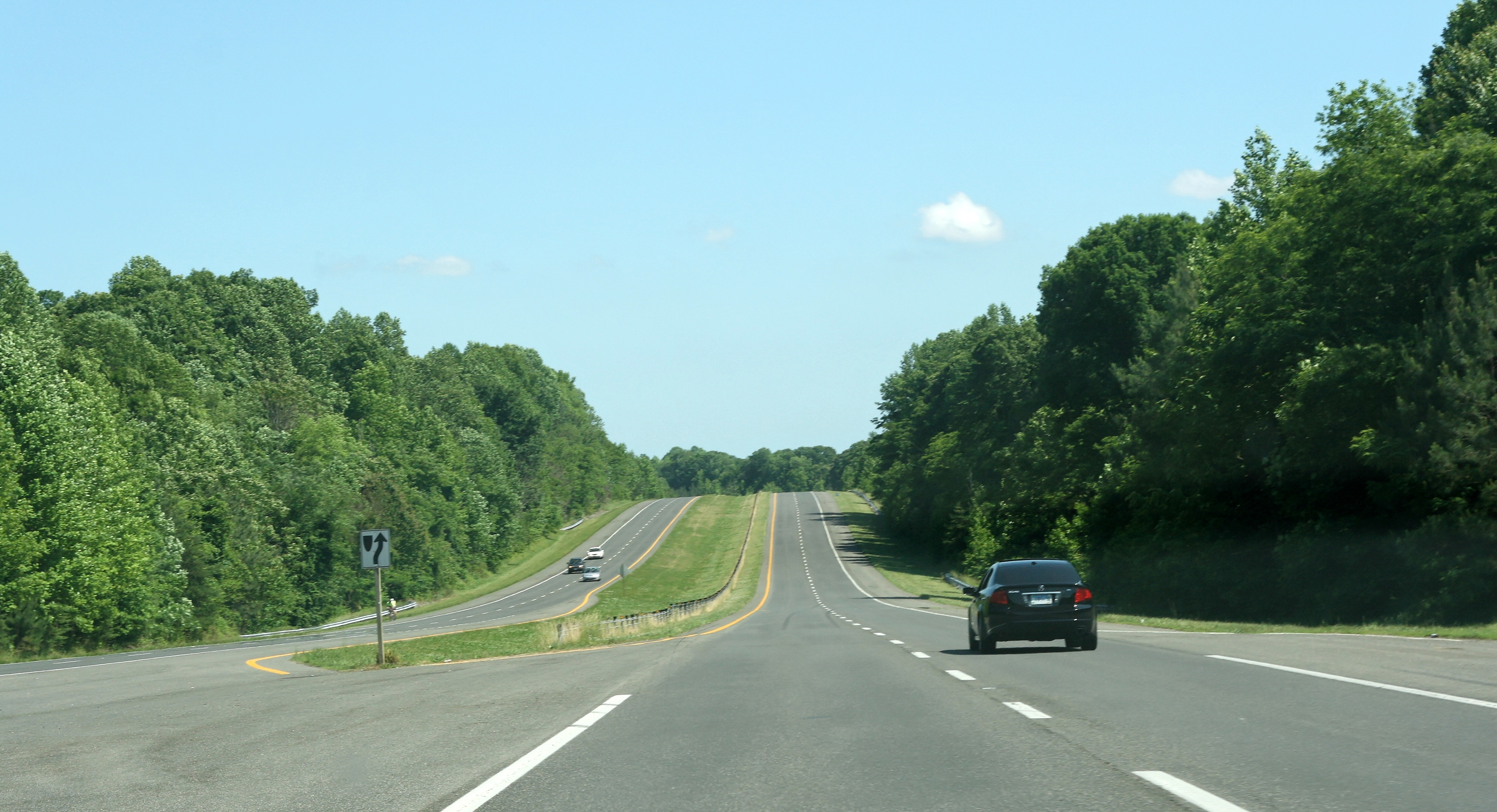
MD 2/MD 4 southbound in Calvert County

Past this intersection, the road continues west through a mix of farms, woods with some residences and businesses. MD 2/MD 4 turns north as it intersects MD 506 (Sixes Road) and a different segment of MD 765 known as MD 765A branches off to the east of MD 2/MD 4 onto Main Street as the road approaches Prince Frederick. The road passes woodland before heading northwest into commercial areas of Prince Frederick. Here, MD 2/MD 4 widens to six lanes before it crosses MD 231. Beyond this intersection, the road passes more businesses, turning north and intersecting MD 765 (Main Street) again. A short distance past MD 765, Solomons Island Road intersects MD 402 (Dares Beach Road). MD 2/MD 4 narrows back to four lanes as it passes more businesses as well as the Calvert Health Medical Center east of the road before heading into areas of farms, woods, and residences. It intersects the western terminus of MD 263 (Plum Point Road), then continues to Huntingtown, where MD 524 loops west of the route into Huntingtown as Old Town Road. A park and ride lot is located southwest of the intersection with the southern terminus of MD 524. Along this stretch, the roadway passes west of Huntingtown High School. Past Huntingtown, the road continues through more rural areas of woodland and farmland with residential areas before MD 2 splits from MD 4 in Sunderland.

At the split, MD 4 heads northwest on four-lane divided Southern Maryland Boulevard while MD 2 heads northeast on two-lane undivided Solomons Island Road. Shortly after splitting from MD 4, the route intersects the eastern terminus of MD 262 (Lower Marlboro Road) before passing east of a park and ride lot serving MTA Maryland commuter buses and heading into woodland with areas of residences and businesses. Another section of MD 765 called Wayside Drive loops to the west of MD 2 for a distance before MD 765 loops again to the east on Mt. Harmony Lane. MD 765 returns to MD 2 past this intersection and MD 778 then loops to the east of the route on Old Solomons Island Road. The route continues north to an intersection with MD 260 (Chesapeake Beach Road) near Owings.

In Calvert County, the daily traffic counts on MD 2 range from a high of 47,681 vehicles at the intersection with MD 402 along the MD 4 concurrency in Prince Frederick to a low of 6,051 vehicles at the southern terminus in Solomons Island in 2007.

=== Anne Arundel County ===
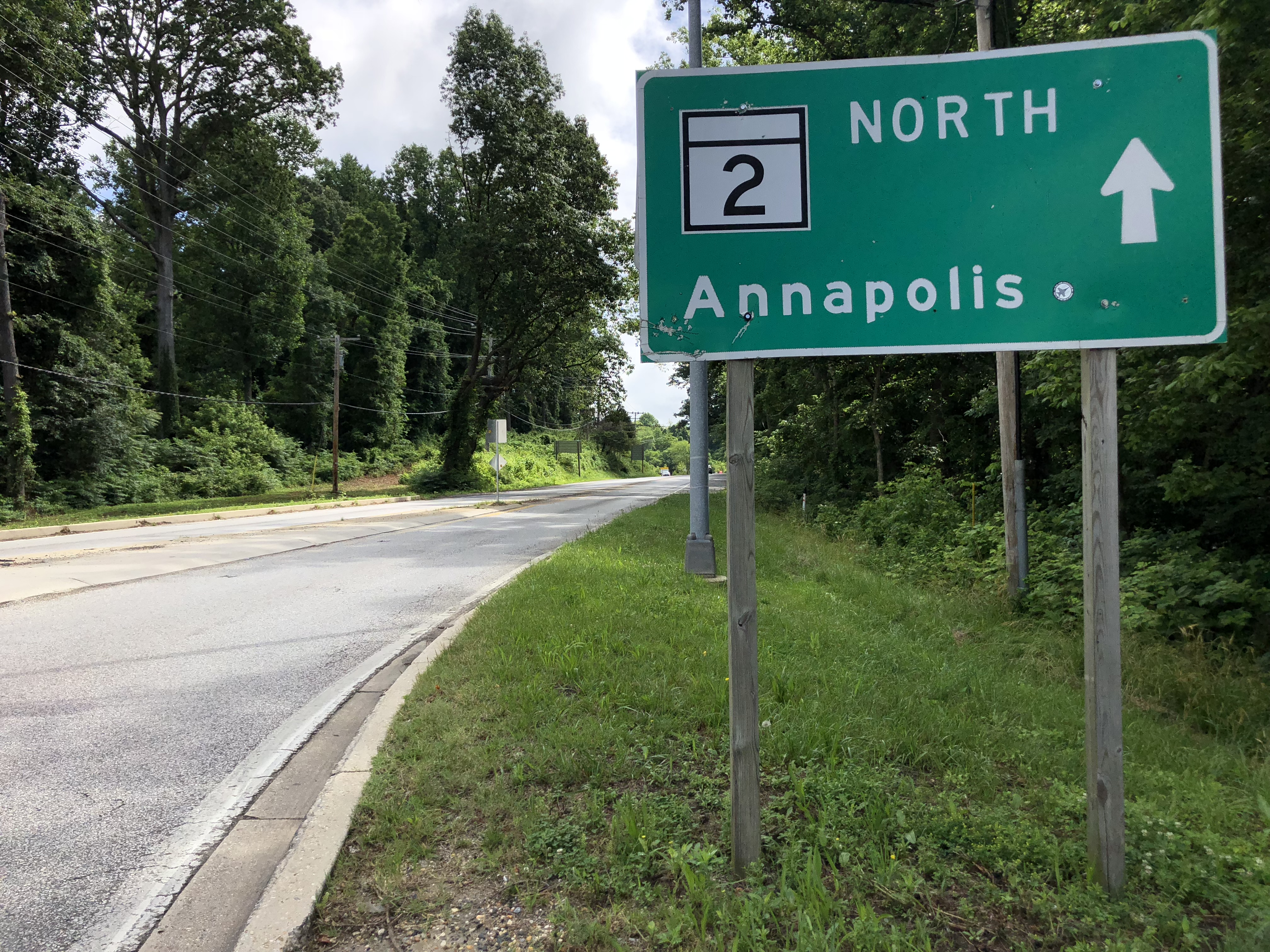
MD 2 northbound at Lothian roundabout with MD 408/MD 422

Just past the MD 260 intersection, MD 2 crosses into Anne Arundel County where it continues through a mix of farmland and woodland. It intersects Friendship Road/Sansbury Road at a roundabout, which connects to MD 261, before intersecting MD 778 again. The route junctions with MD 423 (Fairhaven Road). The road proceeds through rural areas with some residences, coming to an intersection with MD 256 (Deale Road). A short distance later, MD 2 crosses MD 258 (Bay Front Road) and passes east of a park and ride lot as it continues north, with former alignments of the road designated as suffixed segments of MD 778. The road reaches Lothian, where it intersects MD 408 (Mount Zion-Marlboro Road) and MD 422 (Bayard Road) at a roundabout.

At the roundabout, MD 2 makes a turn to the northeast, passing through agricultural areas with some homes. The road intersects MD 255 (Owensville Road) before it curves northwest and passes through the community of Harwood, where it turns northeast and heads east of Southern High School. The route continues through rural land and passes through the community of Birdsville. The road heads northeast, with residential development increasing as the road approaches its intersection with MD 214 (Central Avenue). Here, MD 2 widens into a four-lane divided highway and heads through commercial areas, intersecting MD 253 (Mayo Road) adjacent to Lee Airport. Past this intersection, the road traverses residential areas before it crosses over the South River. The former alignments of MD 2 around the bridge are designated as MD 553. Upon crossing the river, MD 2 continues past residential neighborhoods and widens to six lanes. It comes to an interchange with MD 665 (Aris T. Allen Boulevard). Past the MD 665 interchange, the route heads into commercial areas on the outskirts of Annapolis, with MD 393 (Old Solomons Island Road) branching off from the route and paralleling it to the east. MD 2 crosses MD 450 (West Street) before the route merges onto US 50/US 301 and unsigned I-595 (John Hanson Highway).

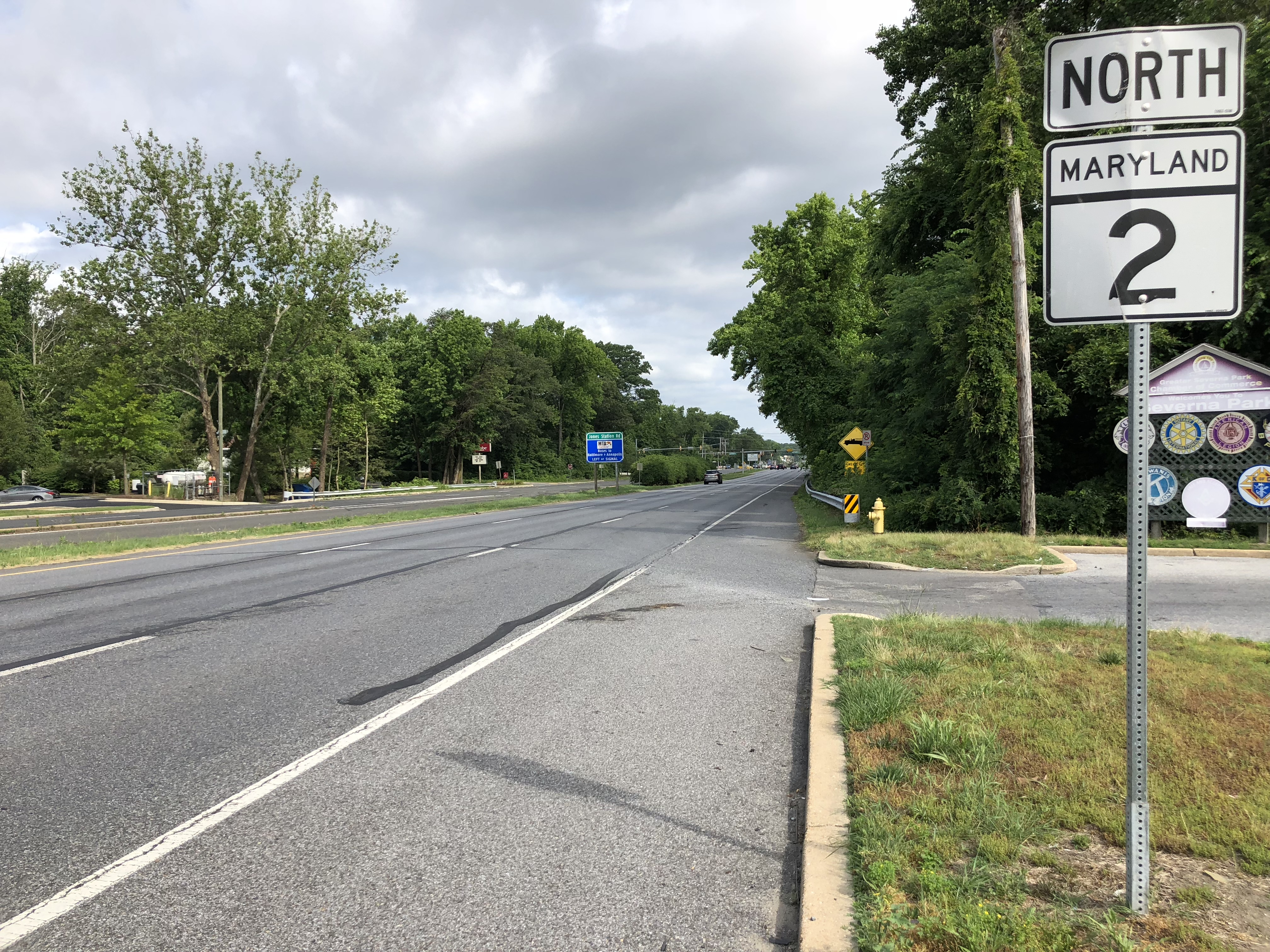
MD 2 northbound entering Severna Park

At the point MD 2 merges onto the John Hanson Highway, the road is eight lanes wide. The road heads through wooded areas, narrowing to six lanes, before coming to an interchange with MD 70 (Rowe Boulevard). At this interchange, the unsigned I-595 designation ends, while US 50/US 301/MD 2 continue northeast on the John Hanson Highway. The route passes under MD 436 (Ridgely Avenue) and runs near residential neighborhoods before crossing over the Severn River on the Pearl Harbor Memorial Bridge. After crossing the Severn River, the road comes to an interchange with the Governor Ritchie Highway. Here, MD 2 leaves US 50/US 301 by heading north on the Governor Ritchie Highway while MD 450 continues south into Annapolis on that road.

MD 2 heads north on the Ritchie Highway, a four-lane divided highway, passing through wooded residential areas of Arnold. The route intersects the north end of a segment of MD 648 (Baltimore Annapolis Boulevard), which branches off and runs west of the route a short distance later. It passes the campus of Anne Arundel Community College and intersects College Drive. The road continues through wooded neighborhoods with some businesses, eventually reaching Severna Park. Here, the route heads through commercial areas, intersecting McKinsey Road near the Severna Park Marketplace (formerly the Severna Park Mall). A short distance later, MD 2 intersects MD 648 (Baltimore-Annapolis Road), forming a brief concurrency with that route before MD 648 heads to the east of it again. The road continues past residences before reaching Pasadena. Shortly after, MD 2 intersects the southern end of MD 10 (Arundel Expressway). Past MD 10, the route heads into commercial areas as a six-lane road before coming to an interchange with MD 100.

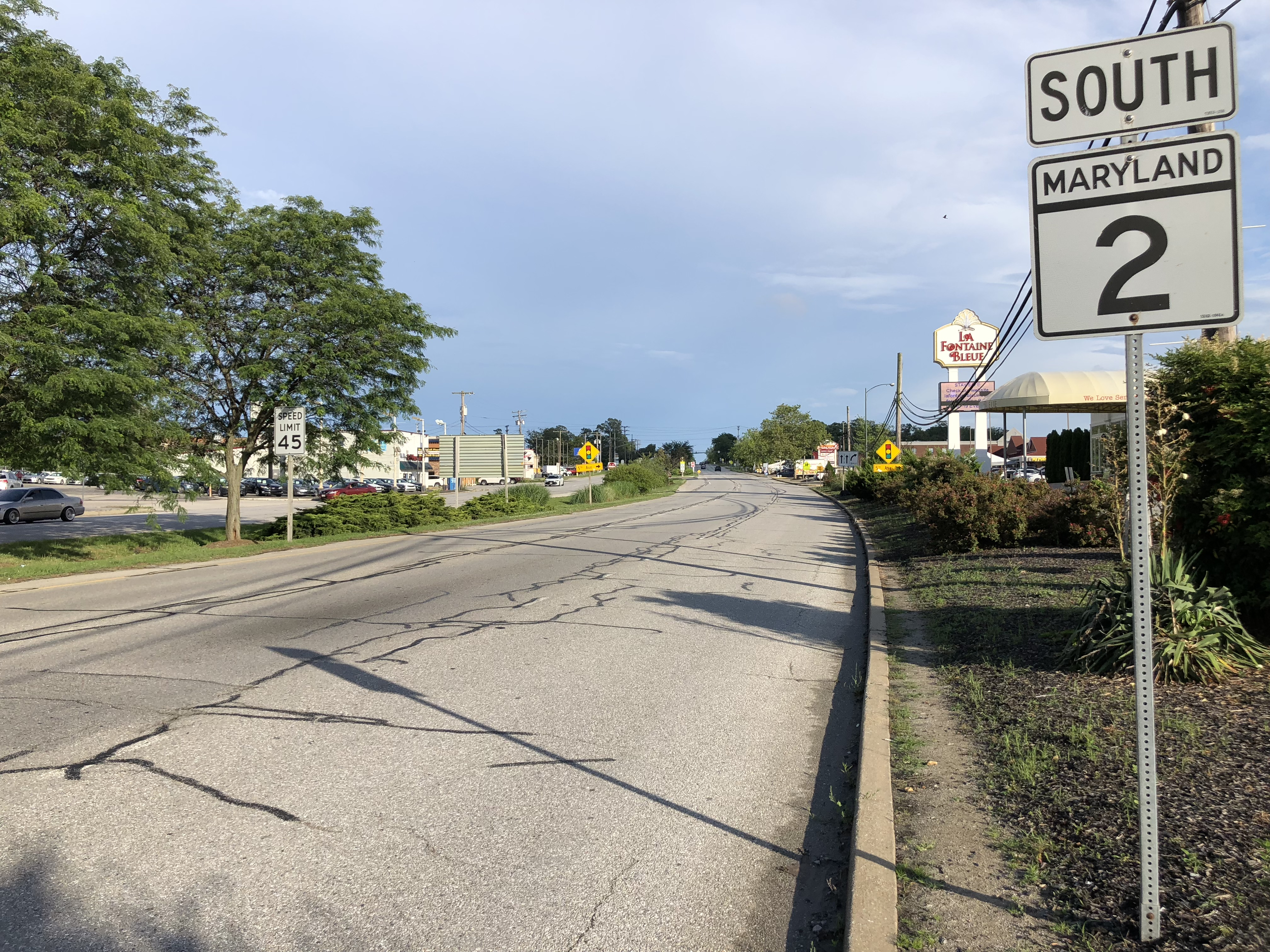
MD 2 southbound past MD 648 in Glen Burnie

Immediately past this interchange, the route intersects MD 177 (Mountain Road) and continues north past more businesses and the Marley Station Mall. MD 2 narrows to four lanes again and continues through residential neighborhoods in Glen Burnie. Before the intersection with Fitzallen Road/Aquahart Road, the route passes Harundale Plaza, which was originally the Harundale Mall, the first enclosed mall on the East Coast, built in 1958. The road passes more residences and then businesses before again crossing over MD 648. Past MD 648, the route continues through commercial areas consisting of numerous businesses and runs a short distance to the east of MD 3 Bus. (Crain Highway). It intersects MD 270 (Furnace Branch Road) before MD 3 Bus. merges into MD 2. The route continues north as a six-lane highway and intersects MD 710 (Ordnance Road). It passes more businesses before coming to an exit and southbound entrance with a spur of I-895 (I-895B) that provides access to and from I-97, westbound I-695, and I-895. A short distance later, MD 2 interchanges with I-695 (Baltimore Beltway) at a partial interchange. At this interchange, MD 711 (Arundel Corporation Road) provides the access from eastbound I-695 to MD 2. Past I-695, MD 2 continues north as a four-lane divided highway that runs through residential and commercial areas of Arundel Gardens, intersecting the western terminus of MD 171 (Church Street). Past MD 171, the route passes through more commercial areas in Brooklyn Park before coming to an intersection with MD 170 (Belle Grove Road) at the boundary of Baltimore city.

In Anne Arundel County, the daily traffic counts on MD 2 range from a high of 121,851 vehicles at the west end of the concurrency with the John Hanson Highway in Annapolis to a low of 14,192 vehicles at the intersection with MD 258 in the southern part of the county in 2007.

=== Baltimore City ===
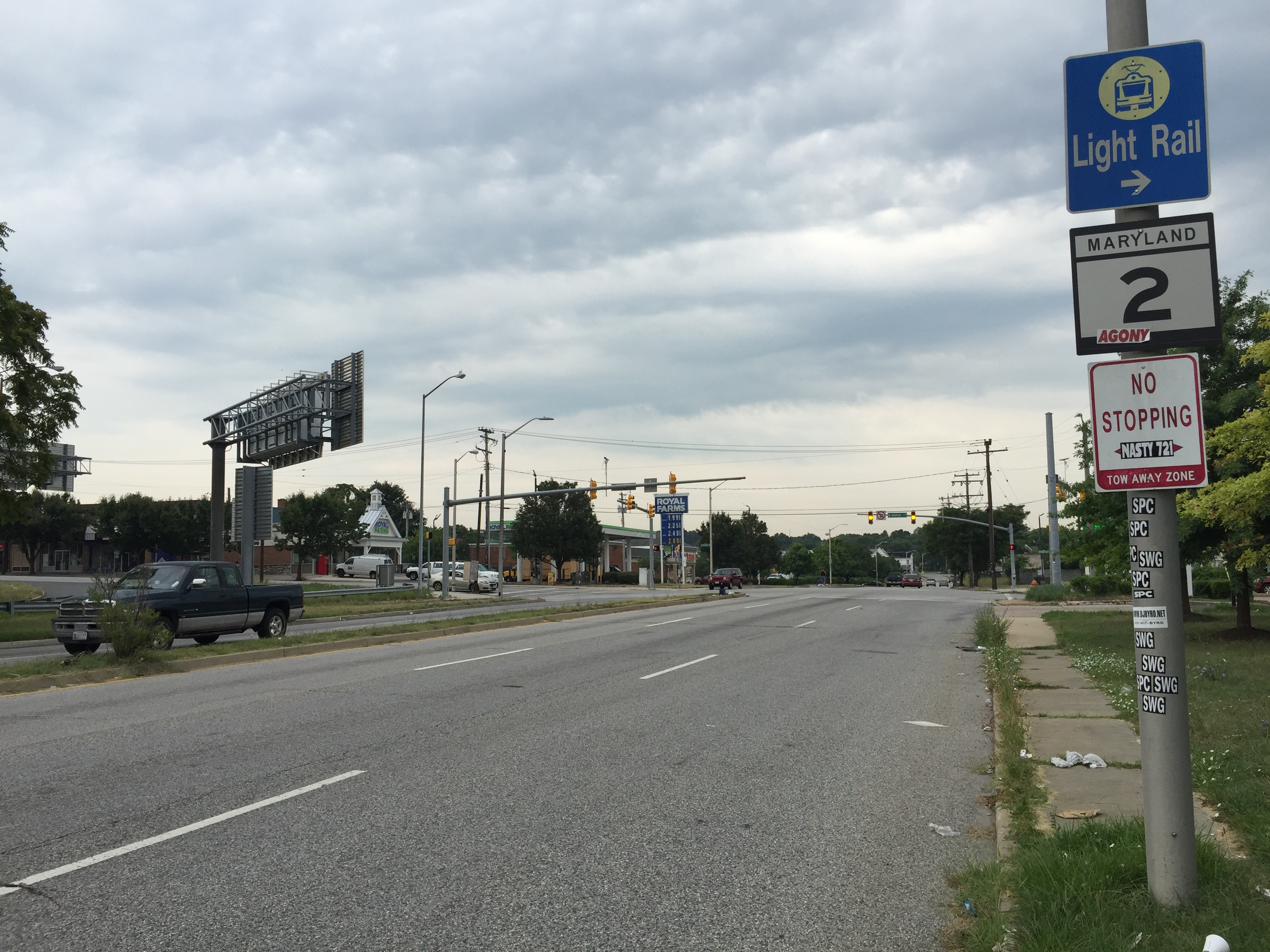
MD 2 southbound approaching MD 173 in Baltimore

MD 2 enters Baltimore, where it becomes Potee Street and is maintained by the Baltimore Department of Transportation. The route heads through urban residential and commercial areas in the Brooklyn neighborhood, intersecting MD 173 (Patapsco Avenue). A short distance later, it comes to an interchange with I-895 (Harbor Tunnel Thruway) a short distance later that has access from northbound MD 2 to northbound I-895 and from southbound I-895 to southbound MD 2. The route passes under the Curtis Bay Branch of CSX's Baltimore Terminal Subdivision railroad line and splits into a one-way pair consisting of four lanes in each direction, with the northbound direction of MD 2 following Hanover Street and the southbound direction of MD 2 following Potee Street. The route crosses over the Patapsco River and continues into the Cherry Hill neighborhood, running to the west of the Middle Branch of the Patapsco River with Hanover Street passing by Harbor Hospital. Past the Waterview Avenue intersection, MD 2 becomes two-way Hanover Street, a five-lane street. It crosses over the Middle Branch on the Hanover Street Bridge and continues north through industrial areas. MD 2 Truck heads east from the route on McComas Street prior to the interchange with I-95. Past the I-95 interchange, MD 2 heads through the Federal Hill neighborhood and immediately adjacent to the Federal Hill and Robert Baker Parks and through areas of rowhouses, as a two-lane street.

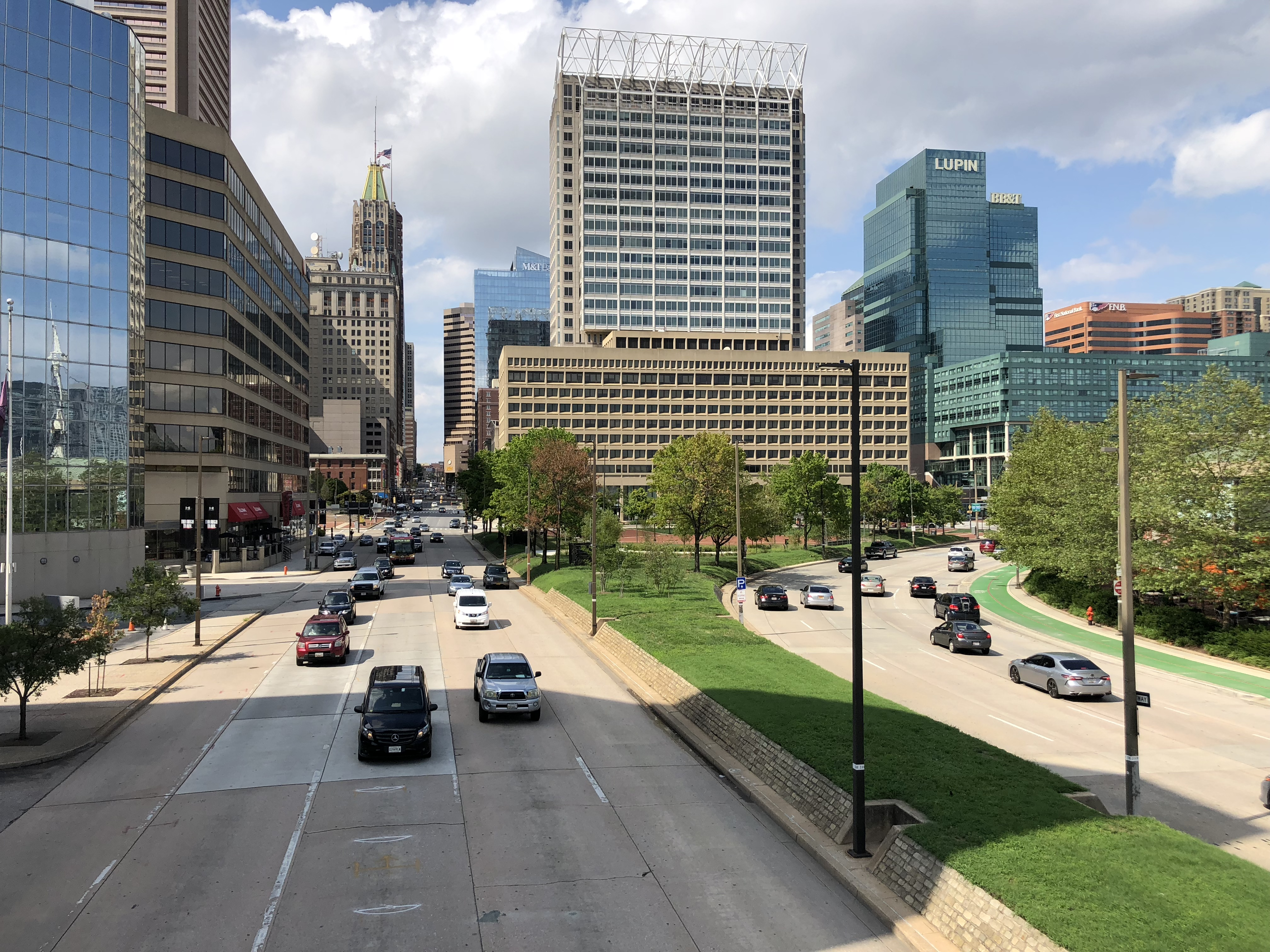
MD 2 northbound where it splits from two-way Light Street into northbound-only Calvert Street and southbound-only St. Paul Street

At the intersection with Montgomery Street, MD 2 splits into another one-way pair with the northbound direction running east on Montgomery Street and then turning north on Light Street, intersecting MD 2 Truck (Key Highway) and passing by the Maryland Science Center, and the southbound direction following Hughes Street to Hanover Street. Along this one-way pair, the route carries one lane in each direction with the exception of Light Street, where the northbound direction has four lanes. Both directions of MD 2 join again along eight-lane divided Light Street and the route heads toward the Inner Harbor. Near Harborplace, the route splits into another one-way pair with northbound MD 2 running along three-lane Calvert Street and southbound MD 2 running along four-lane St. Paul Street. The route crosses many streets in downtown Baltimore, including Pratt Street, Lombard Street, Baltimore Street, Fayette Street, and Saratoga Street. The one-way pair passes by Mercy Medical Center before coming to US 40. Calvert Street passes under US 40 (the Orleans Street Viaduct) while St. Paul Street splits into two roadways between Lexington Street and Centre Street, with the left roadway passing under US 40 and the right roadway intersecting US 40 as it follows the one-way pair of Franklin Street westbound and Mulberry Street eastbound.

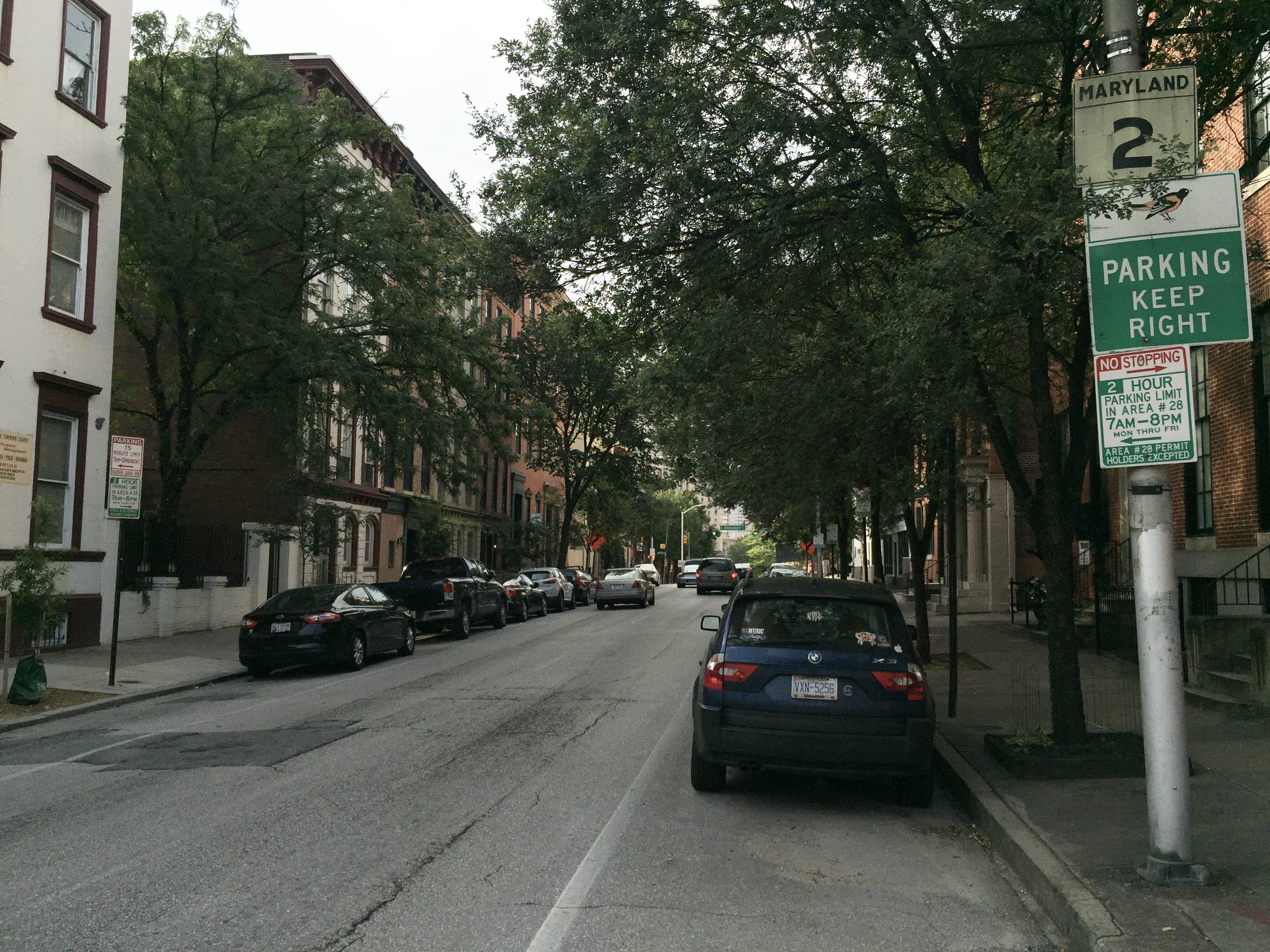
MD 2 southbound along Saint Paul Street in Baltimore

Past US 40, the route heads away from the downtown area and passes more rowhouses. It comes to a partial interchange with I-83 (Jones Falls Expressway), consisting of a ramp from southbound I-83 to southbound MD 2, and crosses over Amtrak's Northeast Corridor railroad line adjacent to Penn Station serving Amtrak and MARC's Penn Line. Past the train station, MD 2 intersects the southern terminus of MD 25, which follows a one-way pair along eastbound Lanvale Street (carrying the southbound direction) and westbound Lafayette Avenue (carrying the northbound direction), before it comes to its northern terminus at US 1/US 40 Truck (North Avenue).

In Baltimore, the daily traffic counts on MD 2 range from a high of 58,375 vehicles along Light Street near the Inner Harbor to a low of 6,075 vehicles along Hanover Street in the Federal Hill neighborhood in 2005.

== History ==
=== Construction of state highways ===
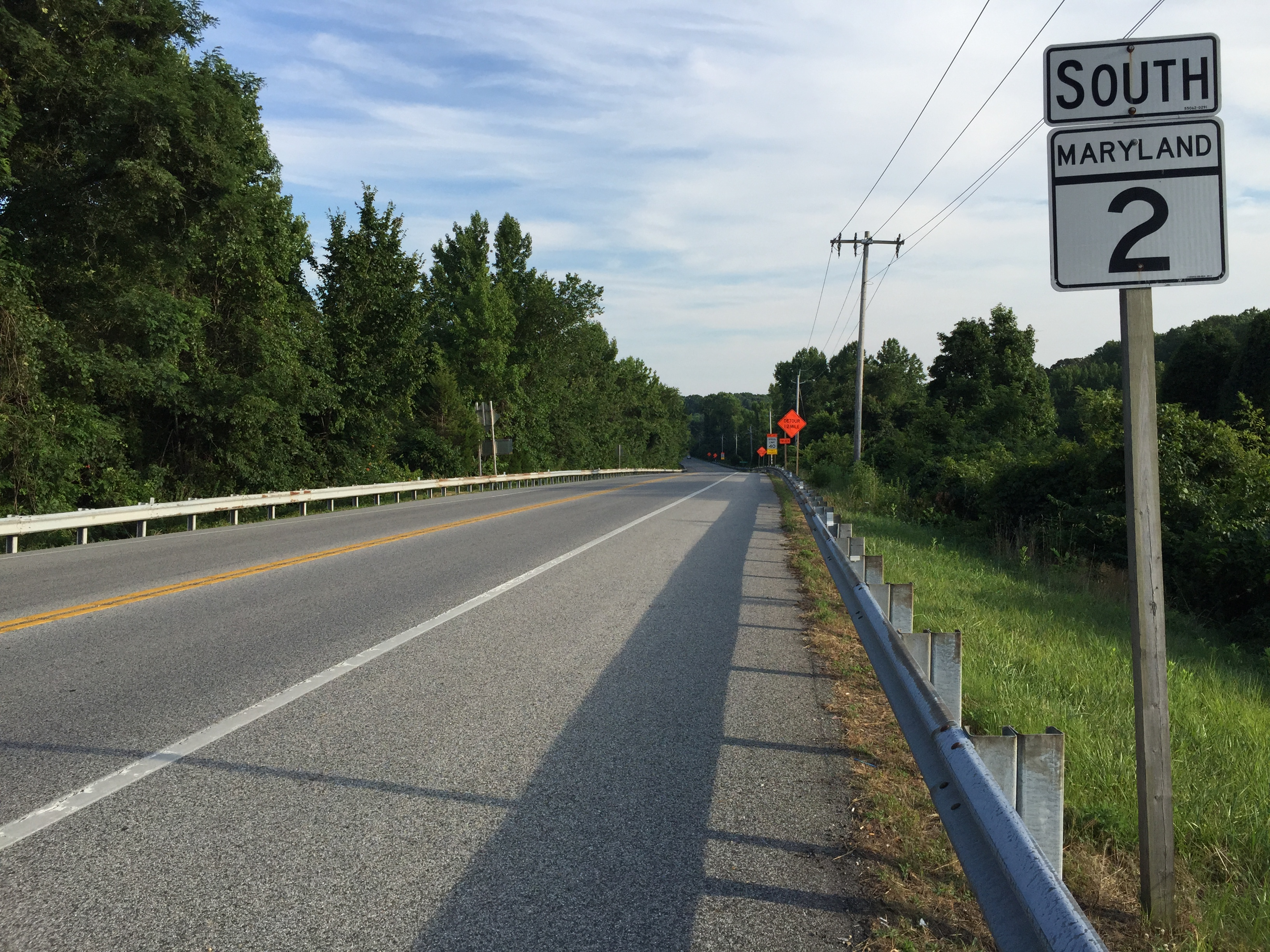
MD 2 southbound in Owings

Solomons Island Road was one of the original state roads marked for improvement to form a statewide system by the Maryland State Roads Commission in 1909. The highway was graded and surfaced as an improved dirt road from Owings south to Hunting Creek in 1910 and 1911 and from there to Prince Frederick between 1911 and 1913. Solomons Island Road from Prince Frederick south to Solomons was graded and surfaced as a dirt road in 1913 except for two segments: a 14-foot (4.3 m) wide shell road was built through Solomons and a 14-foot (4.3 m) wide gravel road was built for 3.6 miles (5.8 km) through Lusby. This highway was improved to a gravel road for its whole length and several dangerous curves were modified by 1919. Solomons Island Road from Lothian to Edgewater was built as a 14-foot (4.3 m) wide gravel road in 1915. The state road between Edgewater and Annapolis was also finished by 1915.

In 1910, the Maryland General Assembly authorized funding for the construction of a boulevard between Annapolis and Baltimore. This boulevard, which would have a minimum road width of 16 feet (4.9 m), would begin in Annapolis, cross the Severn River, head northwest to Glen Burnie, and continue through Anne Arundel and Baltimore counties to the tracks of the Baltimore and Ohio Railroad in South Baltimore. The newly formed Maryland State Roads Commission was placed in charge of constructing the new Baltimore–Annapolis Boulevard. The boulevard was constructed as a 16-foot (4.9 m) wide macadam road from the Severn River north to Arnold and from Severna Park to Pasadena in 1910 and 1911. The sections between Arnold and Severna Park and from Pasadena to Glen Burnie were completed in 1912. The boulevard followed much of what is today MD 648, with the major difference being in Pasadena, where instead of following Waterford Road north to MD 177, the boulevard headed northwest along what are discontinuous segments of MD 915 to Lipins Corner.

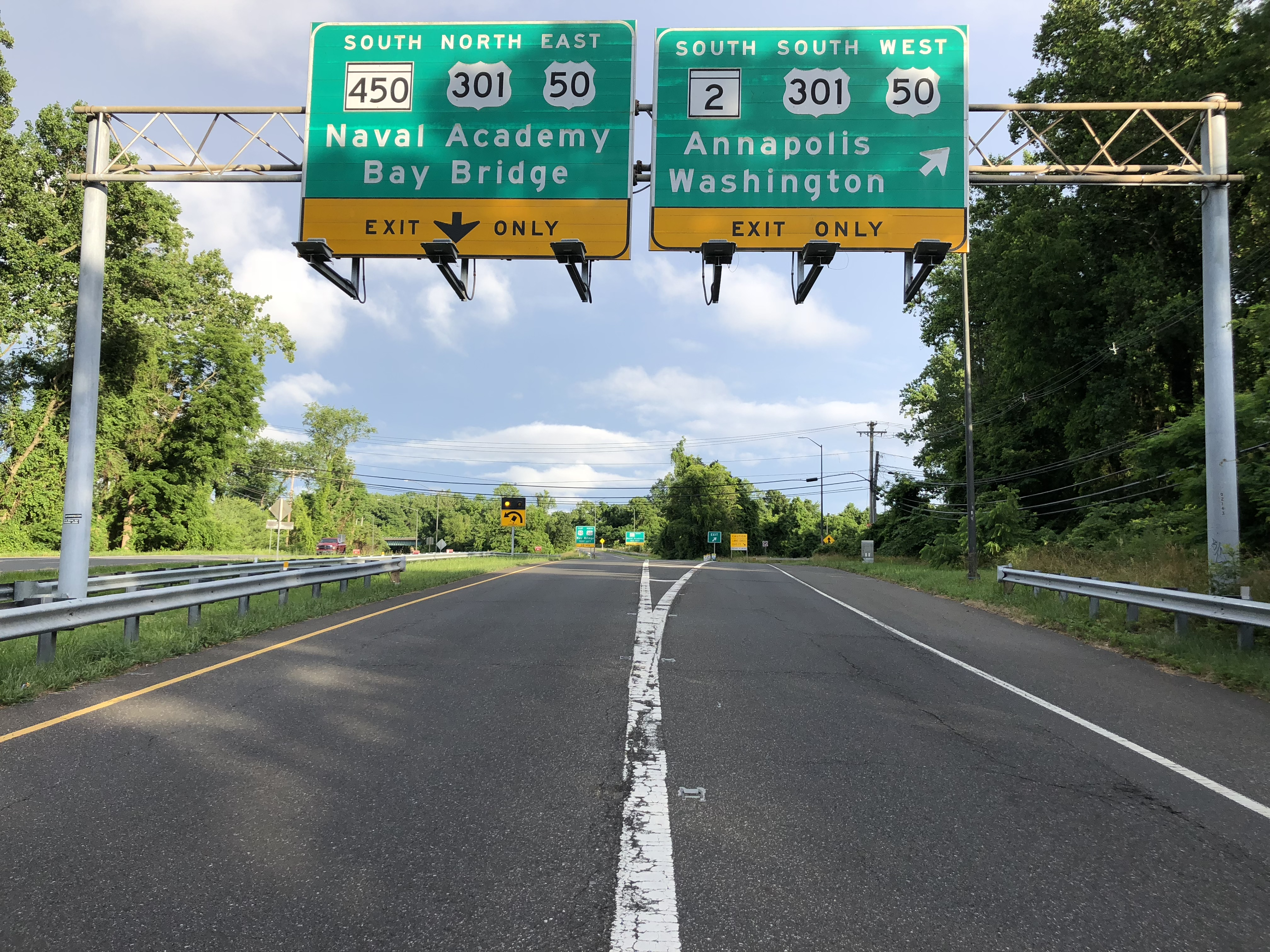
MD 2 southbound at US 50/US 301/MD 450 in Arnold

Unrelated to the Baltimore–Annapolis Boulevard, the commission constructed a 14-to-18-foot (4.3 to 5.5 m) wide macadam road from Glen Burnie to Brooklyn, which was then in Anne Arundel County, in 1915. In Brooklyn, the new highway connected with the south end of the Light Street Bridge that crossed the Patapsco River into Baltimore. With a road completed from Annapolis to Baltimore, the roads commission suggested that it should not be required to complete a road between Glen Burnie and South Baltimore. The commission asked the Maryland General Assembly to pass a bill releasing the commission from the responsibility of completing the highway from Glen Burnie to South Baltimore. However, the Maryland General Assembly disagreed with the Maryland State Roads Commission and passed a bill in 1914 requiring the commission to finish the boulevard between Glen Burnie and South Baltimore. The Baltimore–Annapolis Boulevard north from Glen Burnie to Baltimore was finished in 1916. The final gap in the Baltimore–Annapolis Boulevard was filled when the first modern Severn River Bridge was completed in 1924. This 1,850-foot-long (560 m) concrete bridge, which had a roadway width of 22 feet (6.7 m) and a steel bascule draw with a horizontal clearance of 75 feet (23 m), replaced a narrow one-lane bridge. The entire length of the Baltimore–Annapolis Boulevard was widened to 22 feet (6.7 m) with a pair of 3-foot (0.91 m) wide concrete shoulders by 1927. The highway's bridge over Marley Creek was rebuilt from a width of 16 feet (4.9 m) to 36 feet (11 m) in 1926.

When Maryland assigned state route numbers in 1927, MD 2 was designated between Solomons and Baltimore. The route followed Solomons Island Road from Solomons to west of Annapolis, where it ran concurrent with US 50 into the city on West Street. MD 2 passed through downtown Annapolis on College Avenue and King George Street before it left the city on the Severn River Bridge and continued north along Baltimore–Annapolis Boulevard to Glen Burnie. From Glen Burnie, MD 3 continued along Baltimore–Annapolis Boulevard while MD 2 headed north to Baltimore and connected to Potee Street. MD 2 was designated in Baltimore in 1939 to follow Hanover Street north to US 1.

=== Improvements ===
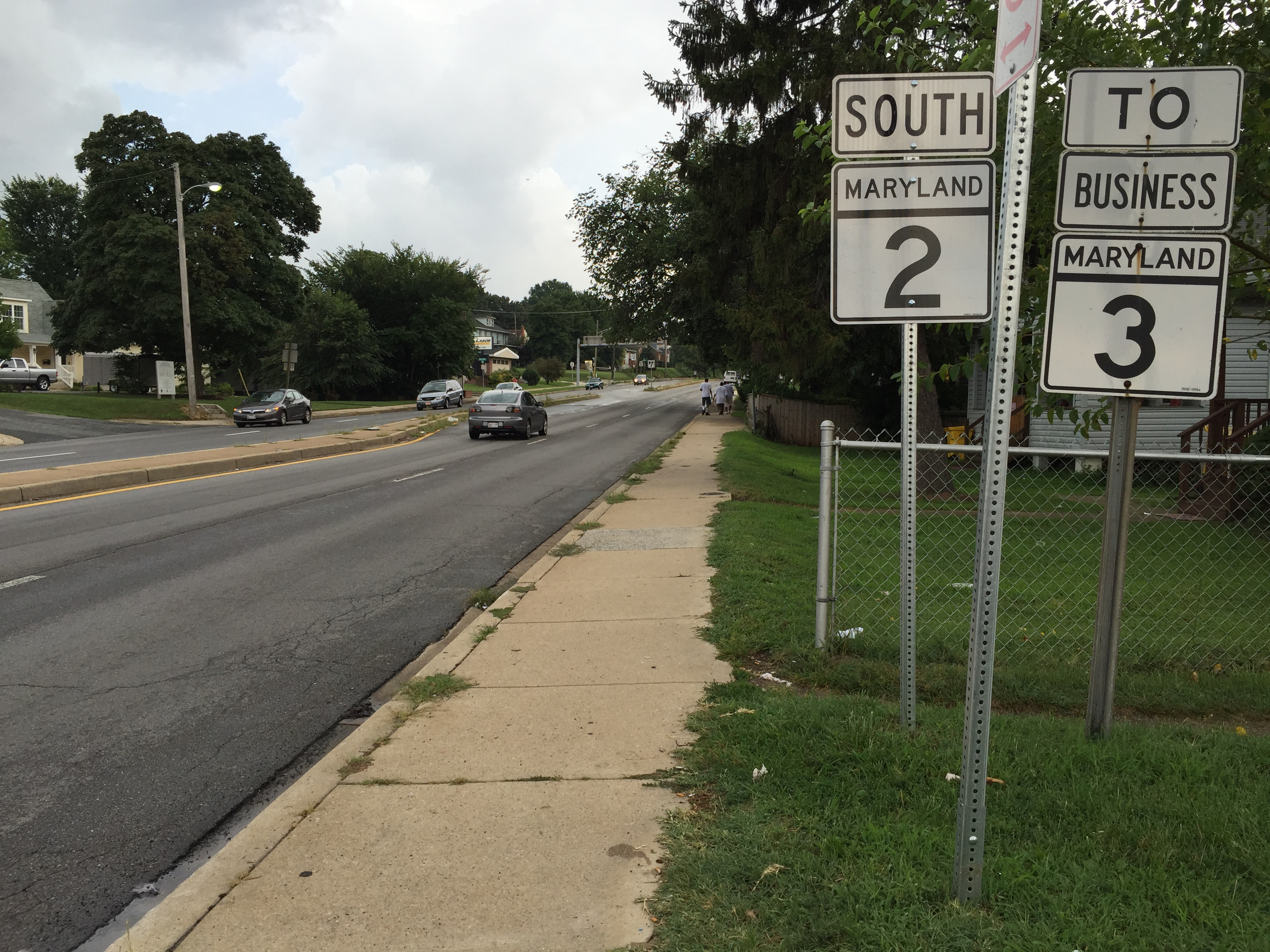
MD 2 southbound at MD 170 in Brooklyn Park

In 1930, a concrete cut-off was built in Glen Burnie that allowed MD 2 traffic to bypass the community's central intersection to the northeast. In 1934, the Maryland State Roads Commission recommended expanding Baltimore–Annapolis Boulevard to at least 30 feet (9.1 m) in width for its entire length, with a width of 40-foot (12 m) urged from MD 177 to MD 3 and on MD 2 from the center of Glen Burnie to Furnace Branch. The first portion of Governor Ritchie Highway was completed as a four-lane divided upgrade to existing MD 2 from the Baltimore city limit in Brooklyn Park to Furnace Branch in 1934 and 1935. Construction on the remainder of Governor Ritchie Highway began in 1936 and was completed south from Furnace Branch to the Severn River in 1938. All old segments of MD 2 were redesignated MD 648 by 1939, with MD 2 designated on the Governor Ritchie Highway. This highway was named for former Maryland Governor Albert C. Ritchie. The Governor Ritchie Highway portion of MD 2 was upgraded to a divided highway in 1950. Throughout the mid 20th-century, a commercial district developed along MD 2 in Glen Burnie, which included several car dealerships and the Harundale Mall. In 1953, the freeway to the north of Annapolis was completed. A divided highway connector between Solomons Island Road and this freeway was built in 1955, and MD 2 was rerouted to bypass Annapolis along with US 50 on this freeway. The former alignment of US 50 and MD 2 in Annapolis was designated as MD 450.

By 1934, the Maryland State Roads Commission proposed Solomons Island Road be widened from 16 to 18 feet (4.9 to 5.5 m) to 20 feet (6.1 m) from Owings to MD 509. The first upgrades to MD 2 between Solomons and Prince Frederick occurred in 1937, when the highway was widened and resurfaced with bituminous stabilized gravel from Prince Frederick south to Port Republic. The highway was upgraded from Port Republic south through St. Leonard to beyond Quaker Swamp, with several relocations including a relocation at that creek, in 1939 and 1940. The MD 2 reconstruction continued south a few miles to the northern end of Lusby in 1942, a stretch widened to 22 feet (6.7 m) and resurfaced with bituminous stabilized gravel. The highway through Lusby was relocated, reconstructed, and surfaced with bituminous stabilized gravel in 1944. The gravel portions of MD 2 from Port Republic to Lusby were bituminous stabilized in 1946. The reconstruction of MD 2 from Prince Frederick to Solomons concluded in 1949 when the highway from Solomons north to the southern end of Lusby was relocated, resurfaced, and surfaced with bituminous stabilized gravel.

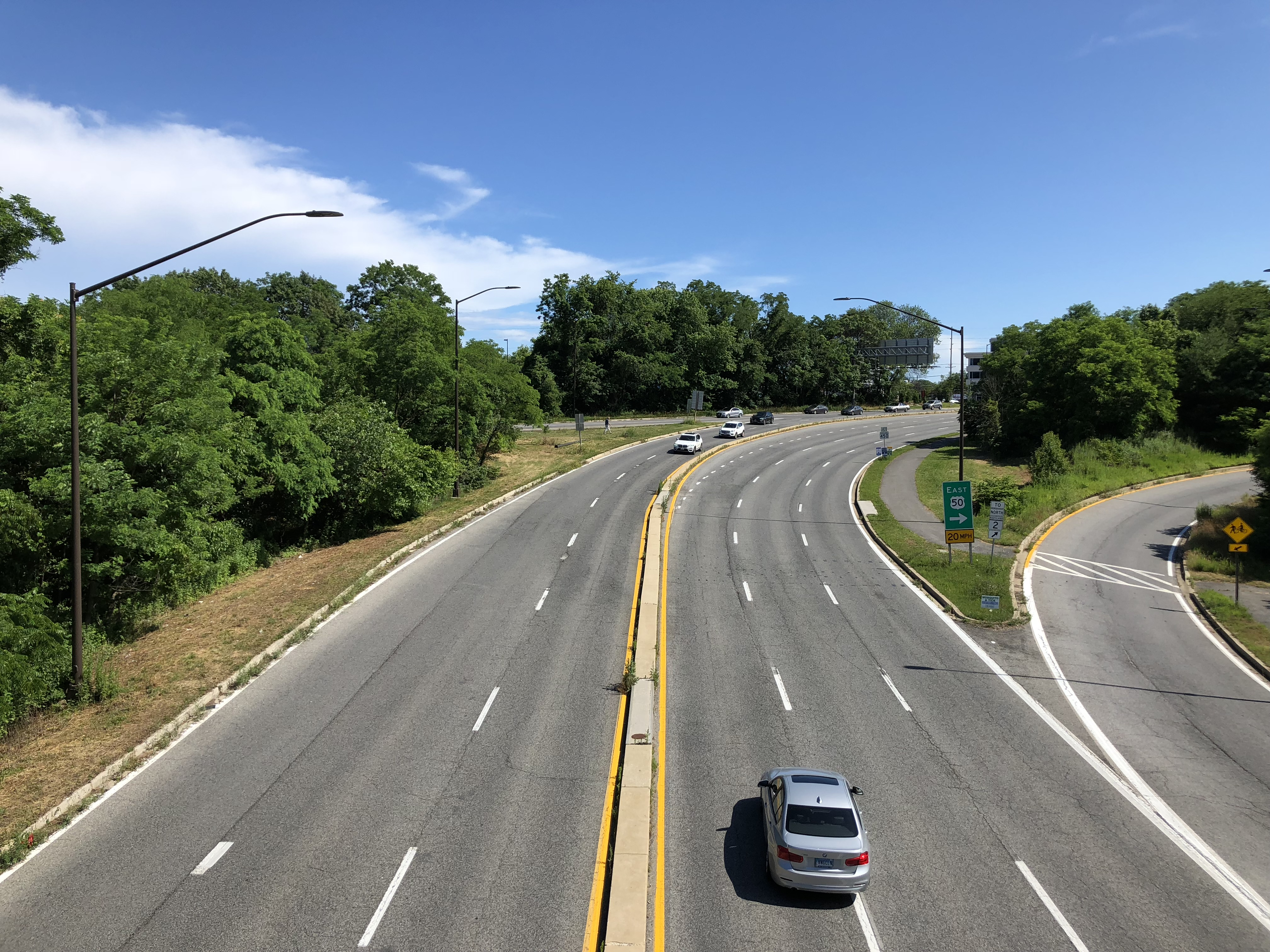
View south along MD 2 from I-595/US 50/US 301 in Parole

MD 2 originally followed Armory Road through the northern part of Prince Frederick. By 1946, the highway had been relocated to its modern alignment and paved north of Armory Road to Sunderland. The bypassed portion of Armory Road was marked as MD 750 by 1950 but may have been removed from the state highway system by 1952. MD 2 was widened to 27 feet (8.2 m) and resurfaced with bituminous concrete through Prince Frederick in 1950. This improvement occurred contemporaneously with or shortly before the construction of the Prince Frederick bypass; MD 2 moved to the new 24-foot (7.3 m) wide bituminous stabilized gravel highway in the autumn of 1951. The bypass was resurfaced with bituminous concrete in 1954 and 1955. By 1956, the old road through the county seat was marked as the first section of MD 765.

The route was paved between Owings and Edgewater by 1946. MD 2 from Owings to Edgewater starting receiving its first major upgrades in the 1950s, including several relocations of the highway. The bypassed portions of MD 2 became segments of MD 778, with the letter suffix on the highway designation corresponding to the order the sections were bypassed. The highway from Edgewater south to Harwood (then known as Butlers) was widened and resurfaced with bituminous stabilized gravel in 1950 and 1951. MD 2 from Harwood south to Lothian was widened and resurfaced with bituminous stabilized gravel in 1952 and 1953. Old Solomons Island Road between Harwood Road and Polling House Road in Harwood remained part of the state highway system until 1987.

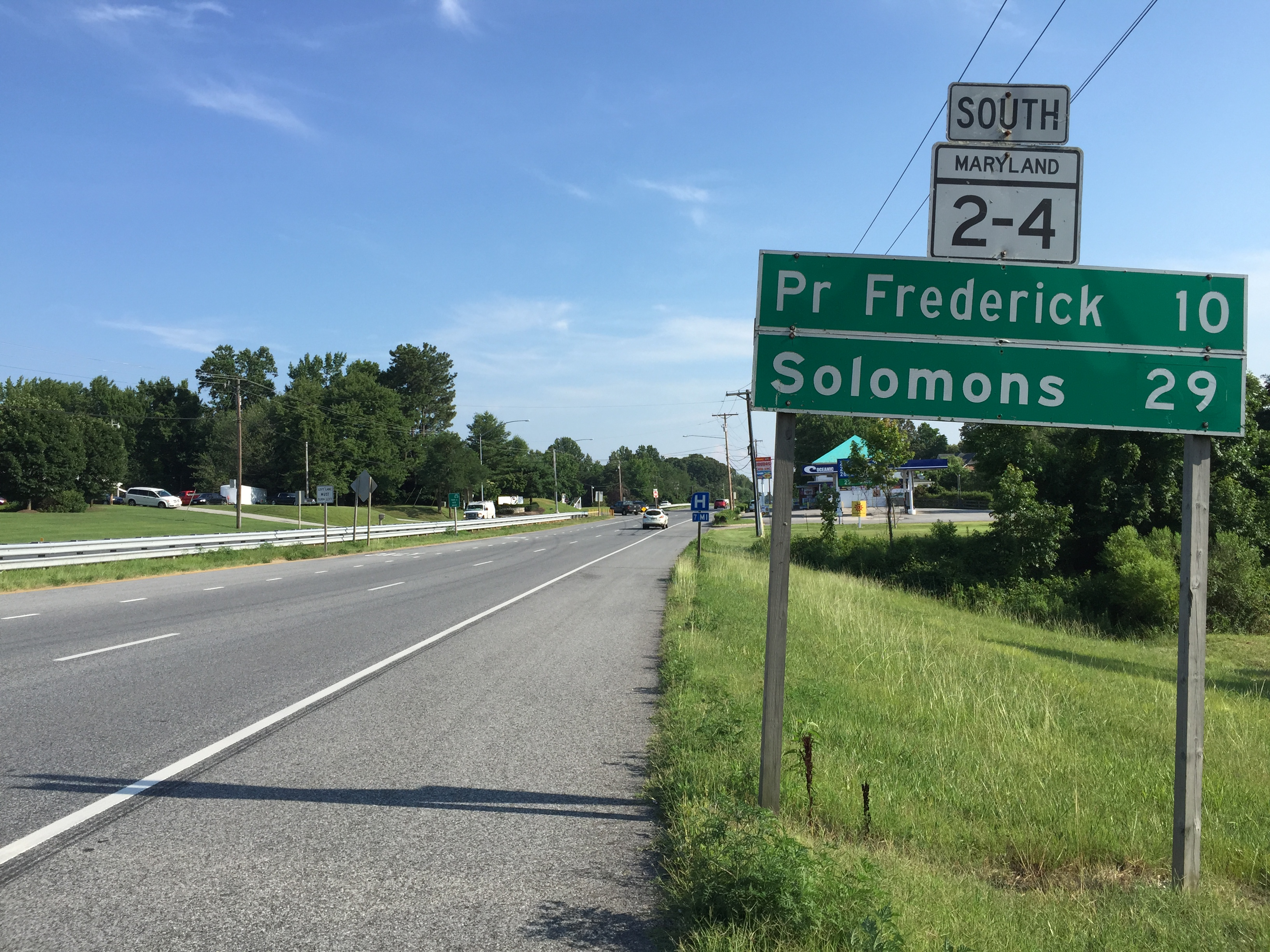
MD 2/MD 4 southbound in Calvert County past the north end of the concurrency

In 1960, MD 416 was designated concurrent with MD 2 between Solomons and Sunderland. In 1965, the MD 416 concurrency was replaced by an overlap with MD 4. Also, MD 2 was shifted to a new alignment between Sunderland and Owings, with the former route becoming MD 765. MD 2/MD 4 was widened to a divided highway between Huntingtown and the split in Sunderland in 1967. The divided highway was extended to south of Huntingtown in 1969, bypassing Huntingtown to the east. The former alignment through the community became MD 524. In 1970, MD 2/MD 4 became a divided highway between Prince Frederick and south of Huntingtown. In January 1978, MD 4 was rerouted north of Solomons onto the Governor Thomas Johnson Bridge over the Patuxent River. In 1979, the divided highway was extended south from Prince Frederick to Port Republic. MD 2/MD 4 was shifted west to a new divided highway between south of St. Leonard to Port Republic in 1981, with the former two-lane routing designated part of MD 765. In 1987, MD 2/MD 4 between Solomons and south of St. Leonard was shifted to a new divided highway. The bypassed alignment through Lusby and Solomons became another part of MD 765.

The Ritchie Highway was originally the main route between Baltimore and Annapolis prior to the completion of I-97 in 1995. Originally, MD 10 was intended to provide a limited-access route between Baltimore and Annapolis, but this route was not completed south of Pasadena after it was deemed that an alternative freeway along the MD 3 corridor (present-day I-97), which required less destruction of residences and businesses, should be built.

In 2010, construction took place to improve the intersection of MD 2/MD 4 and MD 231 in Prince Frederick, widening the road to six lanes in the vicinity of the intersection. This project was the first phase of a larger project to expand MD 2/MD 4 to six lanes between MD 765 south of Prince Frederick and Stoakley Road north of Prince Frederick. In 2018, construction began on the second phase of widening between north of the MD 231 intersection and Fox Run Boulevard. The widening of this section was completed on November 23, 2020.

== Junction list ==
County	Location	mi	km	Exit	Destinations	Notes
Calvert	Solomons	0.00	0.00		MD 2G (Lore Road)	Off-ramp from MD 4 north to MD 2. Lore Road continues east, county maintained.
Calvert	Solomons	0.13	0.21		MD 765 north (Solomons Island Road)	
Calvert	Solomons	0.17	0.27		MD 4 south (Solomons Island Road) – Leonardtown	Interchange; south end of MD 4 overlap
Calvert	Lusby	3.26	5.25		MD 760 south (Rousby Hall Road) – Chesapeake Ranch Estates, Drum Point, Olivet	Northern terminus of MD 760
Calvert	Lusby	4.36	7.02		MD 497 east (Cove Point Road) – Cove Point	
Calvert	Lusby	6.12	9.85		MD 765 (H.G. Trueman Road/Pardoe Road)	
Calvert	Lusby	6.60	10.62		MD 765 south (Pardoe Road)	
Calvert		7.00	11.27		MD 765 north (Nursery Road)	
Calvert		8.00	12.87		MD 765 north (Saw Mill Road)	
Calvert		8.84	14.23		MD 765 south (Saw Mill Road)	
Calvert	St. Leonard	9.65	15.53		MD 765 north (St. Leonard Road)	
Calvert	Port Republic	13.79	22.19		MD 509 east (Governor Run Road) to MD 765 – Port Republic	Signed as MD 509 but officially MD 765B
Calvert	Port Republic	14.64	23.56		MD 264 south (Broomes Island Road)	Northern terminus of MD 264
Calvert	Port Republic	14.66	23.59		MD 765 south (St. Leonard Road) – St. Leonard	Right-in/right-out intersection northbound
Calvert	Port Republic	16.28	26.20		MD 506 west (Sixes Road)	Eastern terminus of MD 506
Calvert	Prince Frederick	17.01	27.37		MD 765 north (Main Street)	
Calvert	Prince Frederick	18.57	29.89		MD 231 (Hallowing Point Road/Church Street) – Hughesville	
Calvert	Prince Frederick	19.12	30.77		MD 765 south (Main Street)	
Calvert	Prince Frederick	19.27	31.01		MD 402 east (Dares Beach Road)	Western terminus of MD 402
Calvert		22.04	35.47		MD 263 east (Plum Point Road) – Parran, Plum Point	Western terminus of MD 263
Calvert	Huntingtown	24.28	39.07		MD 524 north (Old Town Road) – Huntingtown Town Center	
Calvert	Huntingtown	24.96	40.17		MD 524 south (Old Town Road) – Huntingtown Town Center	
Calvert	Sunderland	27.57	44.37		MD 4 north (Southern Maryland Boulevard) – Upper Marlboro	North end of MD 4 overlap
Calvert	Sunderland	27.82	44.77		MD 262 west (Lower Marlboro Road) to MD 4 north	
Calvert		28.80	46.35		MD 765 north (Wayside Drive)	
Calvert		29.64	47.70		MD 765 south (Wayside Drive)	
Calvert		29.95	48.20		MD 765 north (Mount Harmony Lane)	
Calvert		30.74	49.47		MD 765 south (Mount Harmony Lane)	
Calvert	Owings	31.39	50.52		MD 778 north (Old Solomons Island Road)	
Calvert	Owings	32.05	51.58		MD 260 (Chesapeake Beach Road) – Upper Marlboro, Owings, Chesapeake Beach, North Beach	
Anne Arundel		34.34	55.26		MD 778 south (Old Solomons Island Road)	
Anne Arundel		34.43	55.41		MD 423 east (Fairhaven Road)	
Anne Arundel		35.98	57.90		MD 778 north (Old Solomons Island Road)	
Anne Arundel		36.14	58.16		MD 778 south (Old Solomons Island Road)	
Anne Arundel		36.19	58.24		MD 778 north (Old Solomons Island Road)	
Anne Arundel	Tracys Landing	36.41	58.60		MD 256 east (Deale Road) – Deale	Western terminus of MD 256
Anne Arundel	Tracys Landing	36.67	59.01		MD 778 south (Old Solomons Island Road)	
Anne Arundel	Tracys Landing	36.84	59.29		MD 258 south (Bay Front Road) – Upper Marlboro, Deale	
Anne Arundel		38.17	61.43		MD 778 north (Old Solomons Island Road)	
Anne Arundel	Lothian	39.75	63.97		MD 778 north (Old Solomons Island Road)	
Anne Arundel	Lothian	39.95	64.29		MD 778 south (Old Solomons Island Road)	
Anne Arundel	Lothian	40.18	64.66		MD 408 west (Mount Zion-Marlboro Road) / MD 422 west (Bayard Road) – Upper Marlboro, Bayard	Lothian Roundabout; eastern termini of MD 408 and MD 422
Anne Arundel	Lothian	41.48	66.76		MD 255 east (Owensville Road) – Owensville, Galesville	Western terminus of MD 255
Anne Arundel		42.08	67.72		MD 778 north (Old Solomons Island Road)	
Anne Arundel		42.21	67.93		MD 778 south (Old Solomons Island Road)	
Anne Arundel	Mayo	48.31	77.75		MD 214 (Central Avenue) – Washington, Mayo	
Anne Arundel	Mayo	49.33	79.39		MD 253 south (Mayo Road) – London Town Heritage Area	Northern terminus of MD 253
Anne Arundel	Mayo	49.80	80.15		MD 553 north (South River Road)	
Anne Arundel		50.61	81.45		MD 553 south (South River Road)	
Anne Arundel	Annapolis	51.80	83.36		MD 665 (Aris T. Allen Boulevard) to I-97 / US 50 / US 301	Interchange
Anne Arundel	Annapolis	52.09	83.83		MD 393 north (Old Solomons Island Road)	
Anne Arundel	Annapolis	52.66	84.75		MD 450 (West Street)	
Anne Arundel	Annapolis	52.89	85.12	South end of freeway		
Anne Arundel	Annapolis	52.89	85.12	23A	US 50 west / US 301 south (John Hanson Highway) to I-97 – Washington	South end of I-595/US 50/US 301 overlap, US 50/US 301 run concurrently with unsigned I-595
Anne Arundel	Annapolis	54.08	87.03	24	MD 70 (Rowe Boulevard/Bestgate Road) – Annapolis	Signed as exits 24A (MD 70 south) and 24B (MD 70 north to Bestgate Road) southbound
Anne Arundel	Annapolis	54.33	87.44	I-595 ends		
Anne Arundel	Annapolis	55.07	88.63	Pearl Harbor Memorial Bridge over the Severn River		
Anne Arundel	Arnold	55.99	90.11	27	US 50 east / US 301 north (Blue Star Memorial Highway) – Bay Bridge MD 450 south (Ritchie Highway) – Naval Academy	North end of US 50/US 301 overlap
Anne Arundel	Arnold	55.99	90.11	North end of freeway		
Anne Arundel	Arnold	56.39	90.75		MD 648 south (Baltimore Annapolis Boulevard)	
Anne Arundel	Arnold	57.56	92.63		MD 648 north (Baltimore Annapolis Boulevard)	
Anne Arundel	Severna Park	61.51	98.99		MD 648 south (Baltimore Annapolis Boulevard)	South end of MD 648 overlap
Anne Arundel	Severna Park	62.03	99.83		MD 648 north (Baltimore Annapolis Boulevard)	North end of MD 648 overlap
Anne Arundel	Pasadena	64.39	103.63		MD 10 north (Arundel Expressway) to MD 100 west / I-695 – Baltimore	Southern terminus of MD 10
Anne Arundel	Pasadena	66.10	106.38		MD 100 to I-97 – Gibson Island, Baltimore	Interchange
Anne Arundel	Pasadena	66.24	106.60		MD 177 east (Mountain Road) to MD 10 north	Western terminus of MD 177
Anne Arundel	Glen Burnie	68.45	110.16		MD 648 (Baltimore Annapolis Boulevard)	
Anne Arundel	Glen Burnie	69.87	112.44		MD 270 (Furnace Branch Road)	
Anne Arundel	Glen Burnie	70.31	113.15		MD 3 Bus. south (Crain Highway)	
Anne Arundel	Glen Burnie	70.71	113.80		MD 710 east (Ordnance Road) to MD 10 / I-695 east	Western terminus of MD 710
Anne Arundel	Glen Burnie	71.29	114.73		I-895 Toll north (Harbor Tunnel Thruway) to I-695 west / I-97 south – Tunnel	Northbound exit, southbound entrance, exit 6B of I-895
Anne Arundel	Glen Burnie	71.46	115.00		MD 711 east (Arundel Corporation Road)	Provides access to MD 2 from I-695 east
Anne Arundel	Glen Burnie	71.58	115.20		I-695 west (Baltimore Beltway) to I-97 south – Towson	Exit from MD 2 south to I-695 west, entrance to MD 2 north; exit 3A of I-695
Anne Arundel	Arundel Gardens	72.40	116.52		MD 171 east (Church Street)	Western terminus of MD 171
Anne Arundel	Brooklyn Park	73.52	118.32		MD 170 south (Belle Grove Road)	Northern terminus of MD 170
Baltimore City		73.86	118.87		MD 173 south (Patapsco Avenue)	Northern terminus of MD 173
Baltimore City		73.95	119.01		I-895 Toll north (Baltimore Harbor Tunnel Thruway)	Exit 7 of I-895; Northbound exit to northbound I-895, southbound exit from southbound I-895; no exit before toll on I-895
Baltimore City		75.32	121.22	Hanover Street Bridge over the Middle Branch of the Patapsco River		
Baltimore City		75.95	122.23		MD 2 Truck north (McComas Street) to I-95 Toll north – Fort McHenry	
Baltimore City		75.98	122.28		I-95 south to I-395 north – Washington, Downtown	Northbound exit, southbound entrance; exit 54 of I-95
Baltimore City		77.10	124.08		MD 2 Truck south (Key Highway) to I-95	
Baltimore City		78.08	125.66		US 40 (Orleans Street Viaduct, Mulberry Street, Franklin Street)	No connection between MD 2 north and US 40
Baltimore City		78.93	127.03		I-83 (Jones Falls Expressway)	Exit from I-83 south to MD 2, exit 4 of I-83
Baltimore City		79.08– 79.15	127.27– 127.38		MD 25 north (Lanvale Street/Lafayette Avenue)	Southern terminus of MD 25
Baltimore City		79.24	127.52		US 1 / US 40 Truck (North Avenue)	
1.000 mi = 1.609 km; 1.000 km = 0.621 mi: Concurrency terminus; Incomplete access

== Related routes ==
=== Maryland Route 2 Truck ===
Maryland Route 2 Truck
- Location: Baltimore
- Length: 2.3 mi (3.7 km)
- Tourist routes: National Historic Seaport Scenic Byway

Maryland Route 2 Truck is a truck bypass of the Federal Hill neighborhood south of downtown Baltimore, Maryland, United States. The route runs east from MD 2 (Hanover Street) on McComas Street, paralleling I-95. From McComas Street, at exit 55 of I-95 just west of the Fort McHenry Tunnel, the route continues onto Key Highway and heads north and west to MD 2 (Light Street), mostly paralleling the Northwest Harbor and serving the piers on the harbor.

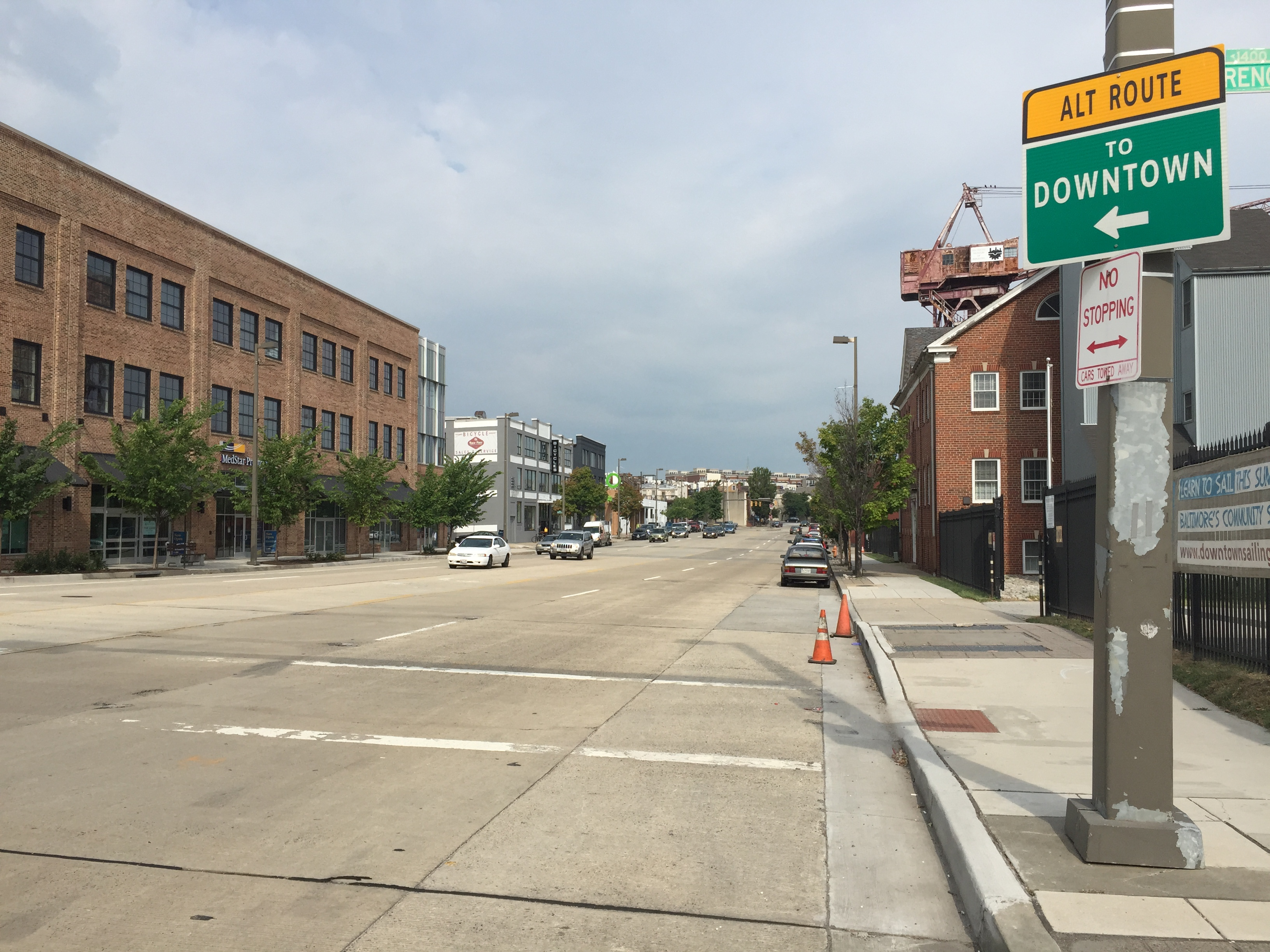
MD 2 Truck along Key Highway in Baltimore

The road was laid out to a width of 160 feet (50 m) from Light Street to Locust Point in the early 1910s, providing better access to the new city-owned piers in preparation for increased trade via the Panama Canal and existing steamship lines to Europe. It was named Key Highway because it was originally planned to extend to Fort McHenry, near where Francis Scott Key wrote "The Star-Spangled Banner." However, the extension of the road to the fort was never built. A rail line ran the length of Key Highway, connecting to the tracks in Pratt Street via Light Street. A two-lane extension of the highway and rail line was built in 1930, branching off the old route east of Ludlow Street and running south under Fort Avenue to McComas Street. The short portion of the old road east of the extension is now East Key Highway; the rail tracks have been removed.

=== Auxiliary routes ===
- MD 2A runs along an unnamed road from a dead end north to an intersection with MD 2/MD 4 in Lusby, Calvert County, where it continues as MD 765. The route is 0.13 mi (0.21 km) long.
- MD 2AB runs along an unnamed road from MD 778N east to MD 2 in Anne Arundel County. The route is 0.04 mi (0.064 km) long.
- MD 2AC runs along Monticello Drive from MD 2/MD 4 north to a cul-de-sac in Lusby, Calvert County. The route is 0.39 mi (0.63 km) long.
- MD 2AD runs along Solomons Island Road from the interchange with I-595/US 50/US 301/MD 2, where the road heads south as part of MD 2, north to Jennifer Road, where the road becomes Medical Parkway, in Annapolis, Anne Arundel County. The route is 0.20 mi (0.32 km) long.
- MD 2AE runs along Coster Mill Bridge Road from MD 2T/MD 2Z east to MD 2/MD 4 in Lusby, Calvert County. The route is 0.03 mi (0.048 km) long.
- MD 2AF runs along Nursery Road from MD 2/MD 4 east to MD 765P in Lusby, Calvert County. The route is 0.04 mi (0.064 km) long.
- MD 2AG runs along an unnamed road from MD 4, heading south before curving east under the Governor Thomas Johnson Bridge before ending at Solomons Island Road south in Solomons, Calvert County. The route is 0.20 mi (0.32 km) long.
- MD 2B runs along an unnamed road that parallels MD 2/MD 4 to the west, coming to dead ends on both ends and intersecting MD 2H along the way, in Lusby, Calvert County. The route is 0.29 mi (0.47 km) long.
- MD 2C runs along Henry Court from MD 2K north to a dead end in St. Leonard, Calvert County. The route is 0.14 mi (0.23 km) long.
- MD 2D runs along David Gray Road and Kingsberry Drive from a dead end north to a private driveway in St. Leonard, Calvert County, intersecting MD 2O. The route is 0.14 mi (0.23 km) long.
- MD 2E runs along an unnamed road that parallels MD 2/MD 4 to the west, coming to dead ends on both ends and intersecting MD 2I along the way, in St. Leonard, Calvert County. The route is 0.25 mi (0.40 km) long.
- MD 2F runs along an unnamed road from a dead end north to MD 765S in St. Leonard, Calvert County. The route is 0.14 mi (0.23 km) long.
- MD 2G runs along an unnamed road from MD 4 east to the southern terminus of MD 2 in Solomons, Calvert County, where it continues as Lore Road. The route is 0.03 mi (0.048 km) long.
- MD 2H runs along an unnamed road from MD 2B east to MD 2/MD 4 in Lusby, Calvert County. The route is 0.03 mi (0.048 km) long.
- MD 2I runs along an unnamed road from MD 2E, where it continues west as West End Boulevard, east to MD 2/MD 4, where it continues east as MD 2J, in St. Leonard, Calvert County. The route is 0.03 mi (0.048 km) long.
- MD 2J runs along Western Shores Boulevard from MD 2/MD 4, where it continues west as MD 2I, east to MD 765 in St. Leonard, Calvert County. The route is 0.13 mi (0.21 km) long.
- MD 2K runs along Lancaster Drive from MD 2C east to MD 2/MD 4 in St. Leonard, Calvert County. The route is 0.03 mi (0.048 km) long.
- MD 2L runs along Parran Road from a bridge over Leonard Creek northeast to MD 2/MD 4 in St. Leonard, Calvert County. The route is 0.11 mi (0.18 km) long.
- MD 2M runs along an unnamed road from a dead end north to MD 2/MD 4 in Lusby, Calvert County. The route is 0.10 mi (0.16 km) long.
- MD 2N runs along Calvert Cliffs Parkway from MD 2/MD 4 east to the entrance of the Calvert Cliffs Nuclear Power Plant in Lusby, Calvert County. The route is 0.11 mi (0.18 km) long.
- MD 2O runs along David Gray Road from MD 2D east to MD 2/MD 4 in St. Leonard, Calvert County. The route is 0.04 mi (0.064 km) long.
- MD 2P runs along White Sands Drive from Heron Lane east to MD 2/MD 4 in Lusby, Calvert County. The route is 0.14 mi (0.23 km) long.
- MD 2Q runs along an unnamed road from MD 2/MD 4 east to MD 765Q in Lusby, Calvert County. The route is 0.06 mi (0.097 km) long.
- MD 2S parallels MD 2/MD 4 to the west, running from two dead ends and intersecting MD 2Y, in Lusby, Calvert County. The route is 0.15 mi (0.24 km) long.
- MD 2T runs along Coster Road from the beginning of state maintenance north to MD 2AE/MD 2Z in Lusby, Calvert County. The route is 0.28 mi (0.45 km) long.
- MD 2V runs along Dowell Road from MD 765Q/MD 765R northwest to MD 2/MD 4 in Solomons, Calvert County. The route is 0.03 mi (0.048 km) long.
- MD 2W runs along Creston Lane from MD 765X east to MD 2/MD 4 in Solomons, Calvert County. The route is 0.03 mi (0.048 km) long.
- MD 2X runs along Newtown Road from MD 765R east to Schooner Loop in Solomons, Calvert County. The route is 0.03 mi (0.048 km) long.
- MD 2Y runs along Mystic Lane from MD 2/MD 4 northwest to MD 2S in Lusby, Calvert County. The route is 0.02 mi (0.032 km) long.
- MD 2Z runs along Mill Bridge Road from MD 2AE/MD 2T north to the end of state maintenance in Lusby, Calvert County. The route is 0.11 mi (0.18 km) long.

== See also ==
- List of state highways in Maryland
