= Birdsville, Maryland =

Unincorporated community in Maryland, United States

- Unincorporated community
- Location within Maryland
- Coordinates: 38°54′00″N 76°35′29″W
- Country: United States
- State: Maryland
- County: Anne Arundel
- Elevation: 128 ft (39 m)
- Time zone: UTC-5 (Eastern (EST))
  - Summer (DST): UTC-4 (EDT)
- Area codes: 410 & 443
- GNIS feature ID: 583250

Birdsville is an unincorporated community in Anne Arundel County, Maryland, United States. Birdsville is located along Maryland Route 2, 3.2 miles (5.1 km) southwest of Edgewater.
