= Owings, Maryland =

- Census-designated place
- Location of Owings, Maryland
- Coordinates: 38°42′43″N 76°36′14″W
- Country: United States
- State: Maryland
- County: Calvert

Area
  - Total: 3.95 sq mi (10.23 km^{2})
  - Land: 3.94 sq mi (10.20 km^{2})
  - Water: 0.012 sq mi (0.03 km^{2})
- Elevation: 89 ft (27 m)

Population (2020)
  - Total: 2,141
  - Density: 543.5/sq mi (209.85/km^{2})
- Time zone: UTC−5 (Eastern (EST))
  - Summer (DST): UTC−4 (EDT)
- ZIP Code: 20736
- Area codes: 410, 443, and 667
- FIPS code: 24-59375
- GNIS feature ID: 0590959

Owings is a town center and much larger census-designated place (CDP) in northern Calvert County, Maryland, United States. The population was 2,149 at the 2010 census, up from 1,325 in 2000. In 2025 the county proposed doubling the size of the town center.

== Geography ==
Owings is located along the northern border of Calvert County at 38°42′43″N 76°36′14″W (38.711919, −76.603901). It is bordered to the north by Friendship in Anne Arundel County. Maryland Route 2 (Solomons Island Road) passes through the CDP west of the center of town, leading north 23 miles (37 km) to Annapolis and south 13 miles (21 km) to Prince Frederick, the Calvert County seat. Maryland Route 260 passes through the center of town and leads southeast 4 miles (6 km) to Chesapeake Beach and northwest 11 miles (18 km) to Upper Marlboro, via MD 4.

According to the United States Census Bureau, the Owings CDP has a total area of 3.9 square miles (10.2 km^{2}), of which 0.01 square miles (0.03 km^{2}), or 0.32%, is water.

The Owings area is considered exurban by the Washington Post. It includes a mix of farmland, single-family detached homes and subdivisions. Aerial maps show that about 50% of the Owings CDP is wooded with county regulations to keep it that way. The place center lies on the former Chesapeake Beach Railway line, which was converted to the roadway Maryland Route 260. Owings was a stop on the railway local service. Hall Creek originates in the Owings vicinity, forms part of the CDP's northern border and winds west until it empties into the Patuxent River. The creek bed cuts a significant valley across the hilly central ridge of the Calvert County peninsula.

== Demographics ==
Historical population
| Census | Pop. | Note | %± |
|---|---|---|---|
| 2000 | 1,325 | | — |
| 2020 | 2,141 | | — |
U.S. Decennial Census

=== 2020 census ===
As of the 2020 census, Owings had a population of 2,141. The median age was 40.8 years. 23.9% of residents were under the age of 18 and 14.9% of residents were 65 years of age or older. For every 100 females there were 97.9 males, and for every 100 females age 18 and over there were 97.5 males age 18 and over.

37.9% of residents lived in urban areas, while 62.1% lived in rural areas.

There were 673 households in Owings, of which 38.5% had children under the age of 18 living in them. Of all households, 73.4% were married-couple households, 8.9% were households with a male householder and no spouse or partner present, and 13.1% were households with a female householder and no spouse or partner present. About 10.4% of all households were made up of individuals and 3.0% had someone living alone who was 65 years of age or older.

There were 698 housing units, of which 3.6% were vacant. The homeowner vacancy rate was 0.3% and the rental vacancy rate was 10.2%.

Racial composition as of the 2020 census
| Race | Number | Percent |
|---|---|---|
| White | 1,723 | 80.5% |
| Black or African American | 188 | 8.8% |
| American Indian and Alaska Native | 14 | 0.7% |
| Asian | 31 | 1.4% |
| Native Hawaiian and Other Pacific Islander | 4 | 0.2% |
| Some other race | 31 | 1.4% |
| Two or more races | 150 | 7.0% |
| Hispanic or Latino (of any race) | 93 | 4.3% |

=== 2000 census ===
As of the 2000 census, there were 1,325 people, 426 households, and 356 families residing in the CDP. The population density was 337.2 inhabitants per square mile (130.2/km^{2}). There were 443 housing units at an average density of 112.7 per square mile (43.5/km^{2}). The racial makeup of the CDP was 86.87% White, 11.47% African American, 0.15% Native American, 0.60% Asian, 0.45% from other races, and 0.45% from two or more races. Hispanic or Latino of any race were 0.75% of the population.

There were 426 households, out of which 42.3% had children under the age of 18 living with them, 71.8% were married couples living together, 8.2% had a female householder with no husband present, and 16.4% were non-families. 10.8% of all households were made up of individuals, and 3.5% had someone living alone who was 65 years of age or older. The average household size was 3.06 and the average family size was 3.30.

In the CDP, the population was spread out, with 29.7% under the age of 18, 5.5% from 18 to 24, 29.9% from 25 to 44, 25.9% from 45 to 64, and 9.1% who were 65 years of age or older. The median age was 38 years. For every 100 females, there were 96.6 males. For every 100 females age 18 and over, there were 89.4 males.

The median income for a household in the CDP was $74,150, and the median income for a family was $74,702. Males had a median income of $49,250 versus $31,204 for females. The per capita income for the CDP was $27,287. About 2.5% of families and 3.5% of the population were below the poverty line, including none of those under age 18 and 9.5% of those age 65 or over.

== History ==
Before the arrival of the railroad, Calvert County was a rural county with few roads and no railroads. It had no factories, and the primary industry was tobacco farming, like most of Southern Maryland before the Civil War.

The Owings family had been present in Maryland since the 18th century in various roles, such as real-estate brokers, merchants, and tradesmen. The family was instrumental in the development of the North Beach/Chesapeake Beach area as a summer resort. It was also instrumental in planning the Chesapeake Beach Railway and utilizing it to ship canned goods out of the county.

Owings was named after Harry P. Owings. The railway station located at the line's intersection with Solomons Island Road was originally known as "Friendship". To avoid confusion with the town of Friendship, located 1.6 miles (2.6 km) northeast of Owings in Anne Arundel County, the president of the railway, David Moffatt, renamed the station "Owings". It was also a tribute to Harry P. Owings. Mr. Owings had been a one-time member of the Maryland House of Delegates as a Democrat from 1888 to 1889. He was a local farmer and was interested in the real estate business. The town of Owings was a result of that interest as many residents purchased land in the area which he had subdivided through his real estate business. He also served as a sales agent in the county for lime, fertilizer, coal, and corrugated metal roofs. In August 1900, Harry P. Owings requested the position of station manager in a letter sent from Owings Station and now in the archives of the Chesapeake Bay Railway Museum archives and was granted the position.

Harry P. Owings also owned the Owings House located at 9714 Old Solomons Road, which is currently recorded with the Maryland Historical Trust. The house was built in 1850 and later served as a boarding house for county residents visiting Owings. The residents would board their horses in the stables and sleep at the Owings House before boarding the train the following morning. The Owings railway stop was the only one in Calvert County in the early days of the line.

A sawmill that operated in Owings in the early 20th century near Old Solomonds Road has disappeared.

The Maidstone Plantation was listed on the National Register of Historic Places in 1971.

== Community resources ==
=== Businesses ===
Owings has a single convenience store–filling station, two childcare centers, at least one church, and a handful of other small businesses clustered around its center. A medical office building with a now-closed pharmacy is at the southeast corner of the Route 2 and Route 260 intersection. A small industrial site has a concrete provider and an automotive shop. There is a funeral home near the southern edge of the CDP.

=== Public services ===
The Owings Post Office is located at 9440 Old Solomon's Island Road approximately 0.4 miles (0.64 km) south of the town center. Windy Hill Elementary and Windy Hill Middle School are located at the eastern edge of the CDP on a contiguous campus. In addition, Northern Middle School and Northern High School are located in the Chaneyville community about 2 miles southwest of the CDP on a contiguous campus. The Mount Harmony Elementary School is also in the CDP as a sole building.

Hutchins Pond is a public pond located within the boundaries of the CDP off of Mount Harmony Lane. It was donated by the Hutchins family. It is managed by the Calvert Nature Society and stocked with trouts by the Maryland Department of Natural Resources.

Owings has a Boys & Girls Club affiliate, the Owings Outlaws, with teams participating in football and basketball.

Housing subdivisions include Cabin Branch, Cross Point, Grover's Summit (1998), Sycamore Ridge (1989), the three Quince Views, Arbor Greene, Fairview and Amber Woods.
