= Friendship, Anne Arundel County, Maryland =

Census-designated place in Anne Arundel County, Maryland, U.S.

Friendship, Maryland
- Census-designated place
- Location within the U.S. state of Maryland Friendship (the United States)
- Coordinates: 38°44′12″N 76°35′22″W
- Country: United States
- State: Maryland
- County: Anne Arundel

Area
  - Total: 1.80 sq mi (4.65 km^{2})
  - Land: 1.80 sq mi (4.65 km^{2})
  - Water: 0 sq mi (0.00 km^{2})
- Elevation: 144 ft (44 m)

Population (2020)
  - Total: 384
  - Density: 213.8/sq mi (82.55/km^{2})
- Time zone: UTC-5 (Eastern (EST))
  - Summer (DST): UTC-4 (EDT)
- ZIP code: 20758
- FIPS code: 24-30650
- GNIS feature ID: 590257

Friendship is an unincorporated community and census-designated place (CDP) in Anne Arundel County, Maryland, United States. As of the 2010 census, its population was 447.

Friendship covers 1.794 square miles (2.887 km^{2}), and is located at the southern tip of Anne Arundel County along Maryland Route 2, by which road it is 22 miles (35 km) north to Annapolis, the state capital, and 15 miles (24 km) south to Prince Frederick, the seat of Calvert County.

== Demographics ==
Historical population
Census	Pop.	Note	%±
2010	447		—
2020	384		−14.1%
U.S. Decennial Census

Friendship first appeared as a census designated place in the 2010 U.S. census.

=== Racial and ethnic composition ===
Friendship CDP, Maryland – Racial and ethnic composition Note: the US Census treats Hispanic/Latino as an ethnic category. This table excludes Latinos from the racial categories and assigns them to a separate category. Hispanics/Latinos may be of any race.
Race / Ethnicity (NH = Non-Hispanic)	Pop 2010	Pop 2020	% 2010	% 2020
White alone (NH)	405	347	90.60%	90.36%
Black or African American alone (NH)	11	9	2.46%	2.34%
Native American or Alaska Native alone (NH)	0	0	0.00%	0.00%
Asian alone (NH)	0	0	0.00%	0.00%
Native Hawaiian or Pacific Islander alone (NH)	0	0	0.00%	0.00%
Other race alone (NH)	0	2	0.00%	0.52%
Mixed race or Multiracial (NH)	10	16	2.24%	4.17%
Hispanic or Latino (any race)	21	10	4.70%	2.60%
Total	447	384	100.00%	100.00%
