= North Beach, Maryland =

- Town
- Town of North Beach
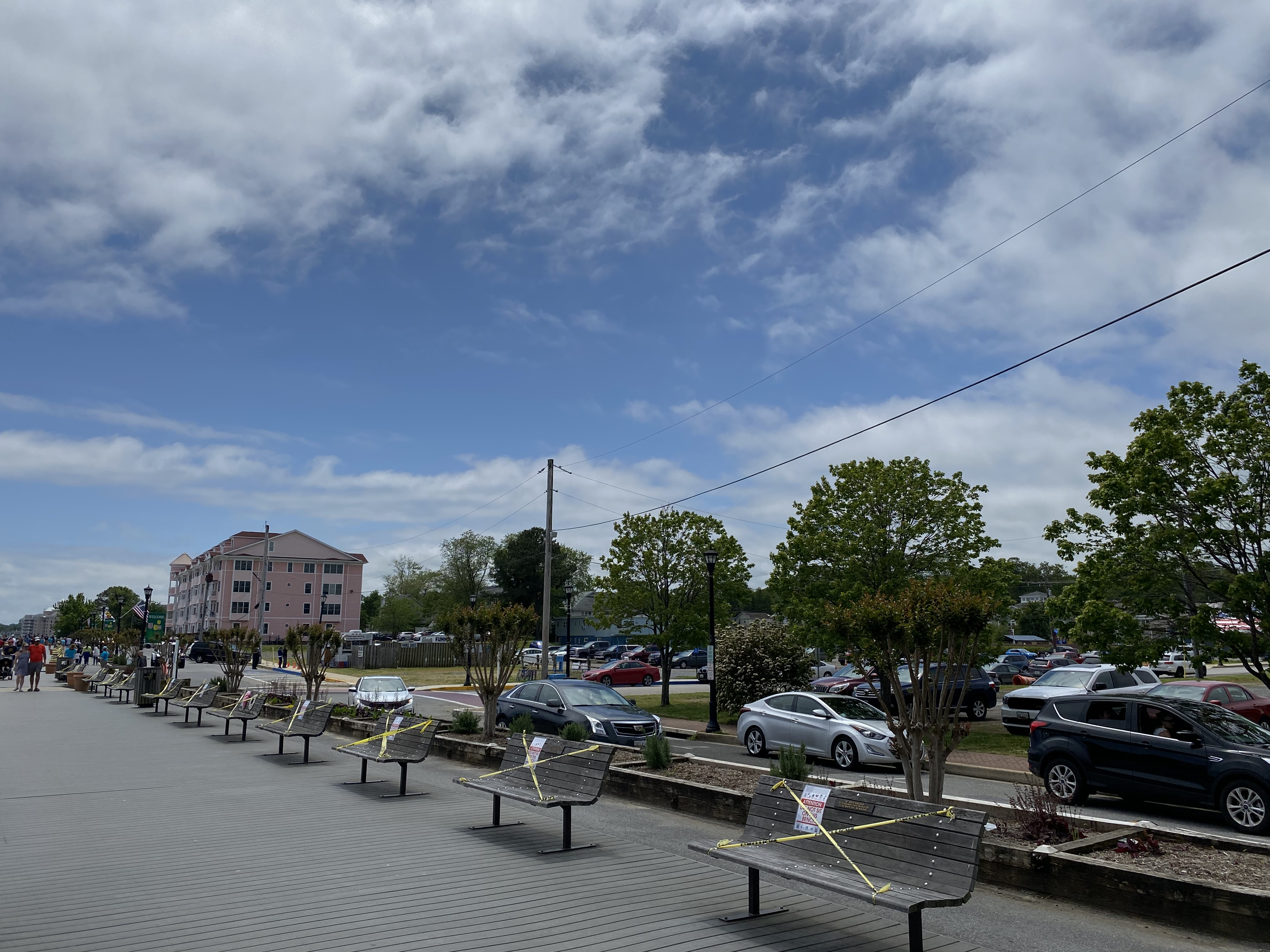
- Along the boardwalk with Southwinds Condominiums in background

- Flag Seal Logo
- Motto: "The Jewel of the Chesapeake Bay!" It is contiguous to the larger incorporated town of Chesapeake Beach.
- Location of North Beach, Maryland
- Coordinates: 38°42′27″N 76°32′4″W
- Country: United States of America
- State: Maryland
- County: Calvert
- Incorporated: 1910

Area
  - Total: 0.34 sq mi (0.89 km^{2})
  - Land: 0.33 sq mi (0.85 km^{2})
  - Water: 0.015 sq mi (0.04 km^{2})
- Elevation: 0 ft (0 m)

Population (2020)
  - Total: 2,146
  - Density: 6,515.3/sq mi (2,515.59/km^{2})
- Time zone: UTC-5 (Eastern (EST))
  - Summer (DST): UTC-4 (EDT)
- ZIP code: 20714
- Area code: 410
- FIPS code: 24-56300
- GNIS feature ID: 0590888
- Website: Town of North Beach, Maryland

North Beach is a town in Calvert County, Maryland, United States, on the Chesapeake Bay. As of the 2020 census, North Beach had a population of 2,146.

In addition to a boardwalk, North Beach has multiple parks, including Wetlands Overlook Park, Sunrise Garden, Callis Park, and the Walton Beach Nature Preserve. It is also the home of the Boys & Girls Club of Southern Maryland and the Twin Beaches Public Library, which opened in April 2024.

The Anne Arundel County communities of Rose Haven and Holland Point use North Beach's ZIP code.

== History ==
The Town of North Beach was originally platted in 1900 and then re-platted in 1908. It was formally incorporated in 1910. It was established as strictly a residential town with ads running in local newspapers proclaiming North Beach as “Washington’s most popular salt water resort.”

Early visitors arrived to the town via steamboat, railroad, oxen carts, trolley cars, and automobiles. For more than 100 years, residents and visitors alike have enjoyed the town's numerous amenities, including swimming; crabbing; boating; searching for sharks' teeth and fossils; pier; boardwalk; top-named bands; carnivals and numerous festivals; parades; beauty contests; gambling; fine local restaurants; hunting and trapping; motorcycles; and a farmer's market.

Revitalization began in the 1980s and escalated in the 1990s.

In 2003, Hurricane Isabel struck North Beach, bringing 4- to 5-foot waves that damaged many residences, businesses, and the boardwalk. Since then, the waterfront of North Beach has been rebuilt with multi-story homes and a condominium.

== Transportation ==
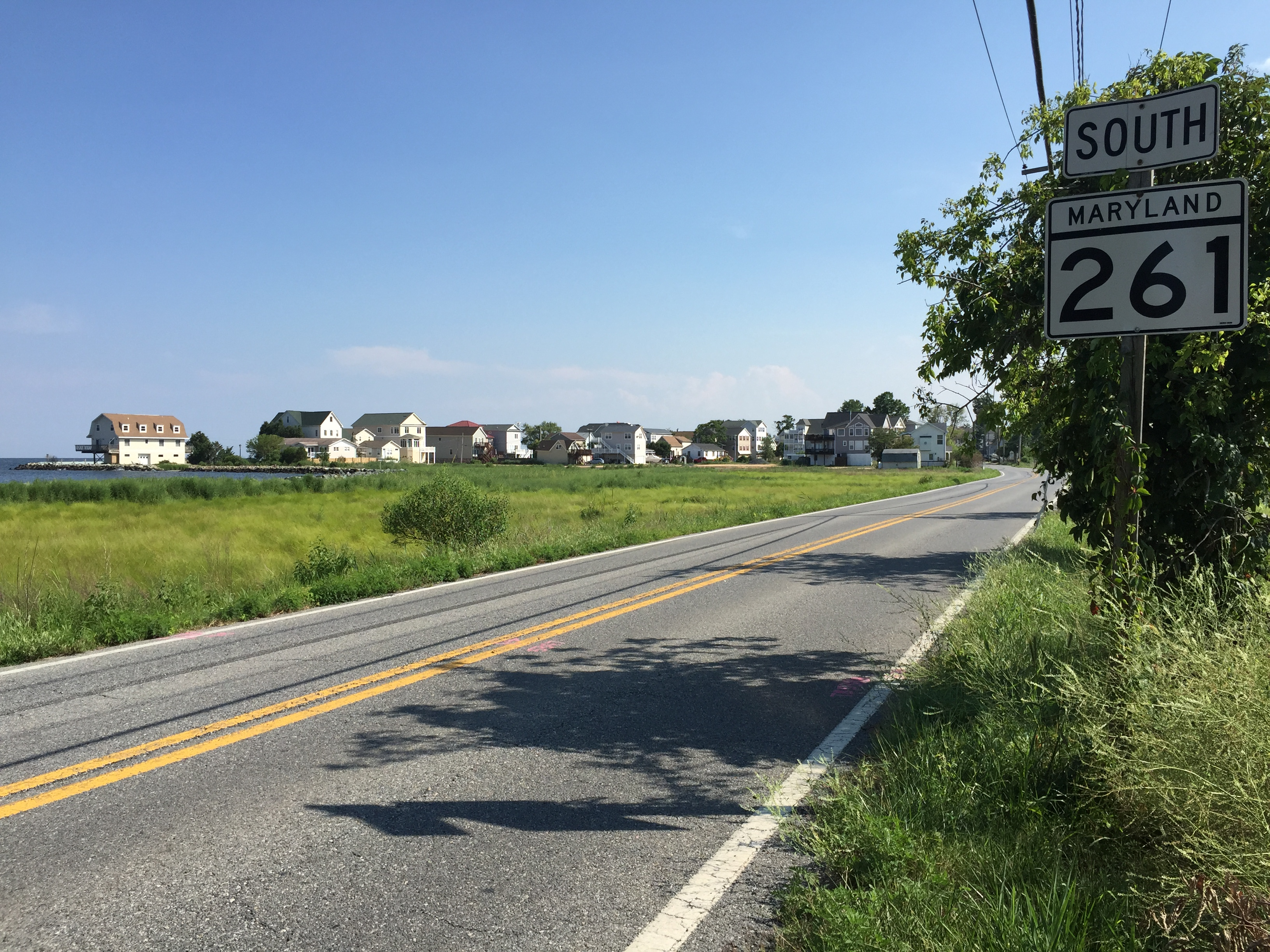
MD 261 in North Beach

The primary method of transport to and from North Beach is by road. The only significant highway serving the town is Maryland Route 261, which follows Chesapeake Avenue, 7th Street, and Bay Avenue through the town from south to north. MD 261 provides the main connection to neighboring Chesapeake Beach, Rose Haven, and other communities along the Chesapeake Bay. In Chesapeake Beach, MD 261 connects to Maryland State Route 260, which heads inland via Maryland Route 2 and Maryland Route 4.

== Geography ==
North Beach is located at 38°42′27″N 76°32′4″W (38.707423, -76.534450).

According to the United States Census Bureau, the town has a total area of 0.34 square miles (0.88 km^{2}), of which 0.33 square miles (0.85 km^{2}) is land and 0.01 square miles (0.03 km^{2}) is water.

== Demographics ==
Historical population
Census	Pop.	Note	%±
1930	107		—
1940	246		129.9%
1950	314		27.6%
1960	606		93.0%
1970	761		25.6%
1980	1,504		97.6%
1990	1,173		−22.0%
2000	1,880		60.3%
2010	1,978		5.2%
2020	2,146		8.5%
U.S. Decennial Census

=== 2020 census ===
As of the 2020 census, North Beach had a population of 2,146. The median age was 40.2 years, with 21.9% of residents under the age of 18 and 16.7% aged 65 years or older. For every 100 females, there were 83.9 males; for every 100 females age 18 and over, 79.4 males.

There were 996 households in North Beach, of which 31.1% had children under the age of 18. Of all households, 30.3% of them had a married couple; 20.7% had a male householder with no spouse or partner present; and 38.9% had a female householder with no spouse or partner present. About 38.9% of all households were made up of individuals, and 17.2% had someone living alone aged 65 years or older.

There were 1,143 housing units, of which 12.9% were vacant. The homeowner vacancy rate was 1.7% and the rental vacancy rate was 5.8%.

Racial composition as of the 2020 census
Race	Number	Percent
White	1,555	72.5%
Black or African American	285	13.3%
American Indian and Alaska Native	6	0.3%
Asian	45	2.1%
Native Hawaiian and Other Pacific Islander	3	0.1%
Some other race	36	1.7%
Two or more races	216	10.1%
Hispanic or Latino (of any race)	147	6.8%

=== 2010 census ===
As of the census of 2010, there were 1,978 people, 911 households, and 466 families residing in the town. The population density was 5,993.9 inhabitants per square mile (2,314.3/km^{2}). There were 1,063 housing units at an average density of 3,221.2 per square mile (1,243.7/km^{2}). The racial makeup of the town was 82.9% White; 10.6% African American; 0.3% Native American; 0.8% Asian; 0.1% Pacific Islander; 1.1% from other races; and 4.2% from two or more races. Hispanics or Latinos of any race accounted for 3.3% of the population.

Of the 911 households, 28.0% had children under the age of 18 living with them, 31.8% had married couples living together, 15.5% had a female householder with no husband present, 3.8% had a male householder with no wife present, and 48.8% were composed of non-family members. Individuals living alone accounted for 38.1% of all households, and 13.5% of individuals living alone were aged 65 or older. The average household size was 2.17; the average family size, 2.89.

The median age was 37.8 years, with 21.2% of residents under the age of 18; 9.1% between 18 and 24; 30.6% between 25 and 44; 27.3% between 45 and 64; and 11.8% aged 65 or older. The gender makeup was 46.6% male and 53.4% female.

=== 2000 census ===
As of the census of 2000, there were 1,880 people, 802 households, and 466 families. The population density was 5,369.1 inhabitants per square mile (2,073.0/km^{2}). There were 895 housing units with an average density of 2,556.0 per square mile (986.9/km^{2}). The racial makeup was 89.52% White; 6.22% African American; 0.96% Native American; 0.96% Asian; 0.37% other races; and 1.97% two or more races. Hispanics or Latinos of any race accounted for 2.07% of the population.

Of the 802 households, 32.8% had children under the age of 18; 37.9% had married couples living together; 15.1% had a female householder with no husband present; and 41.8% were composed of non-family members. Individuals accounted for 34.4% of all households, and 8.5% of them were aged 65 or older. The average household size was 2.34; the average family size, 3.01.

The population was spread out, with 27.3% under the age of 18; 7.3% from 18 to 24; 37.2% from 25 to 44; 20.9% from 45 to 64; and 7.2% aged 65 years or older. The median age was 33 years. For every 100 females, there were 89.1 males; for every 100 females age 18 and over, there were 84.1 males.

The median income for a household in the town was $46,111, and the median income for a family was $51,042. Males had a median income of $42,266 versus $31,563 for females. The per capita income for the town was $22,854. About 10.5% of families and 11.2% of the population were below the poverty line, including 20.4% of those under age 18 and 9.2% of those aged 65 or over.
