= Severna Park Mall =

Defunct shopping mall in Severna Park, MD, US

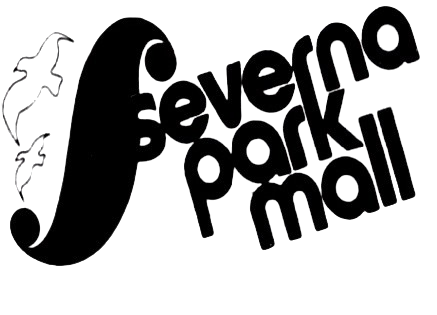
- Location: Severna Park, Maryland
- Coordinates: 39°04′36″N 76°32′35″W
- Opened: October, 1975
- Closed: 2000
- Developer: Metro Development Company
- Num. of anchor tenants: 2
- Floor area: 20,000 square feet (1,900 m^{2})
- Floors: 1

Severna Park Mall was an enclosed shopping mall located in Severna Park, Maryland, on Maryland Route 2 (Ritchie Hwy). Since the demolition of the entire structure in 2000, the site has been occupied by a strip mall known as Severna Park Marketplace featuring Giant Food, Kohl's, Office Depot, A.C. Moore, and several smaller stores.

== History ==
Severna Park Mall opened as a small, local mall in 1975 with Grant City and Giant Food. The Grant City store was short-lived, with Woolco taking its place after one year; after Woolco's closure in 1982, this space was occupied by Caldor. Other stores included Pixie Pizza, Horn and Horn Smorgasbord, Buffy's Yummys, JJ's Records, Dan's Barbershop, Joanne Fabrics, Sidle's Jean Scene, Jason's Pianos, G Briggs, Greene's Jewelers, a Hallmark store, a hair salon, and the restaurant Kona Tiki.

However, as with most smaller regional malls, Severna Park Mall started to decline. Caldor closed in September 1989 after failing to reach a lease agreement with the mall's management, re-opened in October 1991, but closed for good when the entire chain liquidated in 1999. After being mainly an empty mall in the 1990s, Severna Park Mall was largely demolished; only the former Caldor building remained, with Kohl's moving into this building shortly afterward. The rest of the mall was replaced with a strip mall known as Severna Park Marketplace, which featured a new Giant supermarket, as well as several big box tenants.
