= National Register of Historic Places listings in Calvert County, Maryland =

Location of Calvert County in Maryland

This is a list of the National Register of Historic Places listings in Calvert County, Maryland.

This is intended to be a complete list of the properties and districts on the National Register of Historic Places in Calvert County, Maryland, United States. Latitude and longitude coordinates are provided for many National Register properties and districts; these locations may be seen together in a map.

There are 20 properties and districts listed on the National Register in the county, including 2 National Historic Landmarks.

Contents: Counties in Maryland
Allegany - Anne Arundel - Baltimore (city) - Baltimore County - Calvert - Caroline - Carroll - Cecil - Charles - Dorchester - Frederick - Garrett - Harford - Howard - Kent - Montgomery - Prince George's - Queen Anne's - Somerset - St. Mary's - Talbot - Washington - Wicomico - Worcester

This National Park Service list is complete through NPS recent listings posted February 20, 2026.

== Current listings ==
	Name on the Register	Image	Date listed	Location	City or town	Description
1	All Saints' Church	All Saints' Church	March 14, 1973 (#73000908)	100 Lower Marlboro Road, near the intersection of Southern Maryland Boulevard and Solomons Island Road; 38°39′42″N 76°36′26″W	Sunderland	
2	Cedar Hill	Cedar Hill	May 22, 1973 (#73000905)	2 miles west of Barstow on Buena Vista Rd. 38°31′57″N 76°37′58″W	Barstow	
3	Chesapeake Beach Railway Station	Chesapeake Beach Railway Station	September 11, 1980 (#80001798)	8005 Bayside Rd. 38°41′24″N 76°32′03″W	Chesapeake Beach	
4	Christ Church	Christ Church	November 12, 1975 (#75000871)	Southwest of Port Republic on Broome Island Rd. 38°29′38″N 76°32′12″W	Port Republic	
5	Cornehill	Cornehill	October 31, 1972 (#72000572)	Emmanuel Church Rd. 38°35′20″N 76°33′19″W	Parran	
6	Cove Point Lighthouse	Cove Point Lighthouse	April 11, 1973 (#73000907)	3500 Lighthouse Boulevard, off Maryland Route 497; 38°23′10″N 76°22′55″W	Lusby	
7	Drum Point Lighthouse	Drum Point Lighthouse	April 11, 1973 (#73000910)	West shore of Back Creek, Calvert Marine Museum; 38°19′52″N 76°27′49″W	Solomons Island	
8	Grahame House	Grahame House	April 26, 1972 (#72000571)	Northeast of Maryland Routes 262 and 523; 38°39′25″N 76°40′42″W	Lower Marlboro	
9	La Veille		September 20, 1973 (#73000909)	West of Mutual on Ben La Veille Rd. off Maryland Route 264; 38°28′33″N 76°35′25″W	Mutual	
10	Linden	Linden	March 24, 2000 (#00000285)	70 Church St. 38°32′24″N 76°35′16″W	Prince Frederick	
11	J. C. Lore Oyster House	J. C. Lore Oyster House	March 22, 1984 (#84003869)	Maryland Route 2; 38°19′26″N 76°27′40″W	Solomons	
12	Joseph D. Lyons House		July 22, 1998 (#98000839)	7120 Wayside Dr. 38°40′38″N 76°35′54″W	Sunderland	
13	Maidstone	Maidstone	June 21, 1971 (#71000370)	Chesapeake Beach Rd. 38°44′05″N 76°37′38″W	Owings	
14	Middleham Chapel	Middleham Chapel	February 20, 1975 (#75000870)	1 mile southeast of Lusby on Maryland Route 4; 38°23′56″N 76°26′13″W	Lusby	
15	Morgan Hill Farm	Morgan Hill Farm	April 3, 1976 (#76000981)	Sollers Rd., west of Lusby; 38°24′35″N 76°28′46″W	Lusby	
16	Patterson's Archeological District	Patterson's Archeological District	April 12, 1982 (#82002808)	Address Restricted	Wallville	
17	Preston-on-the-Patuxent	Preston-on-the-Patuxent	October 9, 1974 (#74000943)	North of Johnstown off Sollers Mill Rd. 38°22′20″N 76°29′06″W	Johnstown	
18	Taney Place	Taney Place	September 22, 1972 (#72000570)	South of Adelina on Maryland Route 508; 38°27′43″N 76°36′19″W	Adelina	
19	WM. B. TENNISON (Chesapeake Bay Bugeye)	WM. B. TENNISON (Chesapeake Bay Bugeye)	March 27, 1980 (#80001799)	Calvert Marine Museum; 38°19′30″N 76°27′39″W	Solomons	
20	Willow Glenn	Willow Glenn	July 2, 1973 (#73000906)	Northwest of Barstow on Barstow Rd. 38°32′44″N 76°38′06″W	Barstow	

== See also ==
- List of National Historic Landmarks in Maryland
- National Register of Historic Places listings in Maryland
