= Maryland Route 265 =

State highway in Maryland, United States

Maryland Route 265
- Mackall Road
- Maryland Route 265 highlighted in red

Route information
- Maintained by MDSHA
- Length: 1.75 mi (2.82 km)
- Existed: 1929–present
- Tourist routes: Star-Spangled Banner Scenic Byway

Major junctions
- South end: Beginning of state maintenance near Mutual
- North end: MD 264 at Mutual

Location
- Country: United States
- State: Maryland
- Counties: Calvert

Highway system
- Maryland highway system; Interstate; US; State; Scenic Byways
| ← MD 264 | → MD 267 |

Maryland Route 265 (MD 265) is a state highway in the U.S. state of Maryland. Known as Mackall Road, the state highway runs 1.75 miles (2.82 km) from the beginning of state maintenance near Mutual north to MD 264 at Mutual in Calvert County. MD 265 was constructed in the late 1920s and early 1930s. The state highway originally extended south through Wallville to St. Leonard Creek. MD 265's southern terminus was moved north four times between 1962 and 1995.

== Route description ==
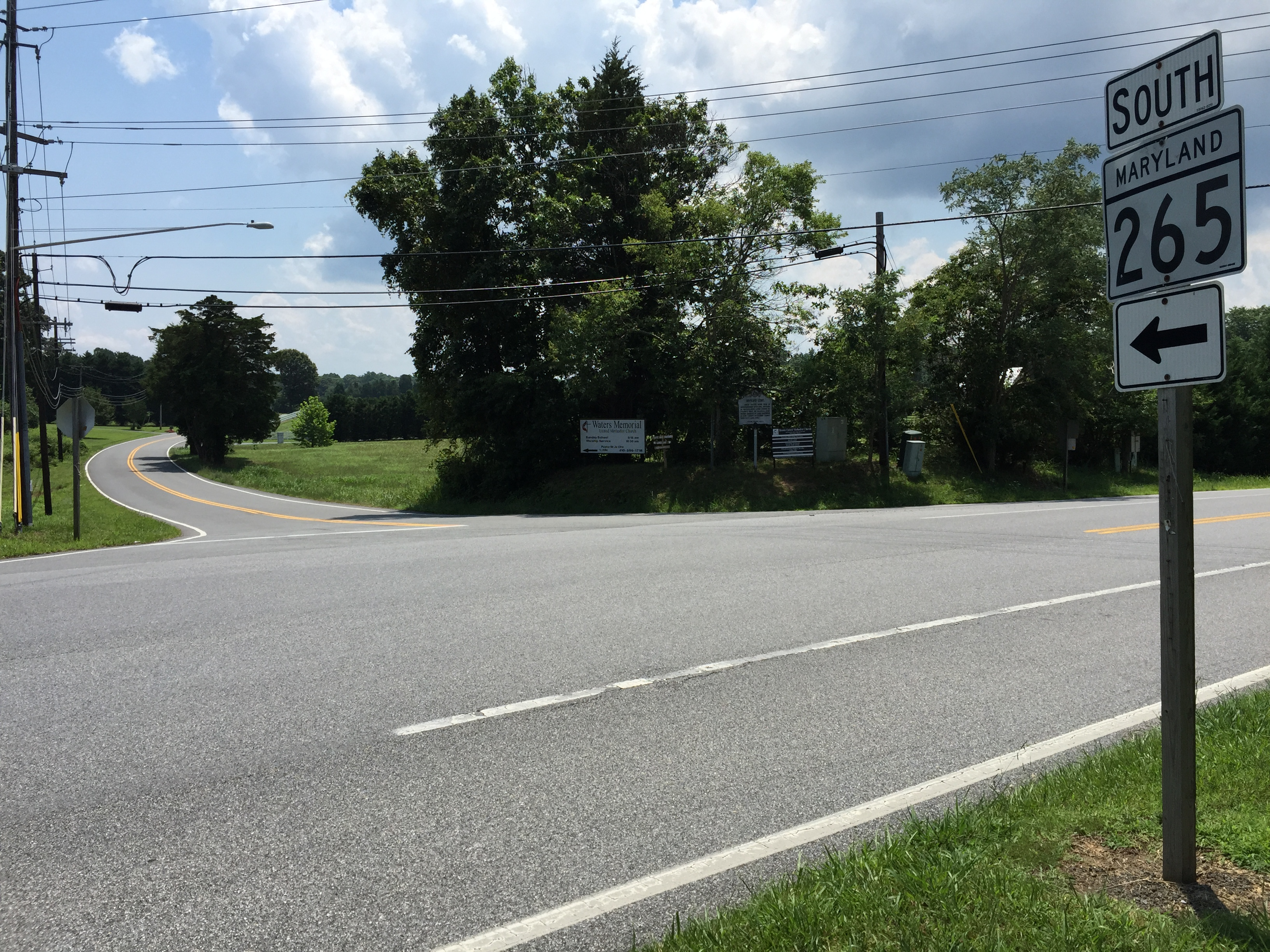
View south from the north end of MD 265 at MD 264 in Mutual

MD 265 begins at an arbitrary point on Mackall Road 0.10 miles (0.16 km) south of Constitution Drive near Mutual. Mackall Road continues south as a county highway through Wallville and Mackall to the end of the road at St. Leonard Creek near the Jefferson Patterson Park and Museum. MD 265 heads north as a two-lane undivided road through wooded areas with some fields and homes to the community of Mutual, where the highway reaches its northern terminus at MD 264 (Broomes Island Road), which continues north to an intersection with MD 2/MD 4 (Solomons Island Road) in Port Republic.

== History ==
MD 265 originally extended south from Mutual 7 miles (11 km) to the hamlet of Mackall at the mouth of St. Leonard Creek. The first section of the state highway was constructed as a gravel road from Mutual in 1929. The second segment was added in 1930, reaching south to 1 mile (1.6 km) north of Wallville. MD 265 was completed to St. Leonard Creek between 1930 and 1933. The state highway has been progressively truncated since 1962 when the southern terminus was rolled back from St. Leonard Creek to north of Wallville. MD 265 was truncated again in 1963 and 1967 before the final adjustment around 1995 that resulted in the state highway's current length.

== Junction list ==
The entire route is in Mutual, Calvert County.

| mi | km | Destinations | Notes |
|---|---|---|---|
| 0.00 | 0.00 | Mackall Road south – Wallville | Southern terminus; beginning of state maintenance |
| 1.75 | 2.82 | MD 264 (Broomes Island Road) – Broomes Island, Port Republic | Northern terminus |
1.000 mi = 1.609 km; 1.000 km = 0.621 mi
