= Maryland Route 264 =

State highway in Maryland, United States

Maryland Route 264
- Broomes Island Road
- Maryland Route 264 highlighted in red

Route information
- Maintained by MDSHA
- Length: 6.66 mi (10.72 km)
- Existed: 1927–present
- Tourist routes: Star-Spangled Banner Scenic Byway

Major junctions
- South end: Oyster House Road at Broomes Island
- MD 265 at Mutual
- North end: MD 2 / MD 4 in Port Republic

Location
- Country: United States
- State: Maryland
- Counties: Calvert

Highway system
- Maryland highway system; Interstate; US; State; Scenic Byways
← MD 263	→ MD 265

Maryland Route 264 (MD 264) is a state highway in the U.S. state of Maryland. Known as Broomes Island Road, the route runs 6.66 miles (10.72 km) from Oyster House Road at Broomes Island north to MD 2/MD 4 in Port Republic. MD 264 connects the central Calvert County communities of Broomes Island, Island Creek, and Mutual with the county's main highway at Port Republic. The state highway was constructed in the early 1920s.

== Route description ==
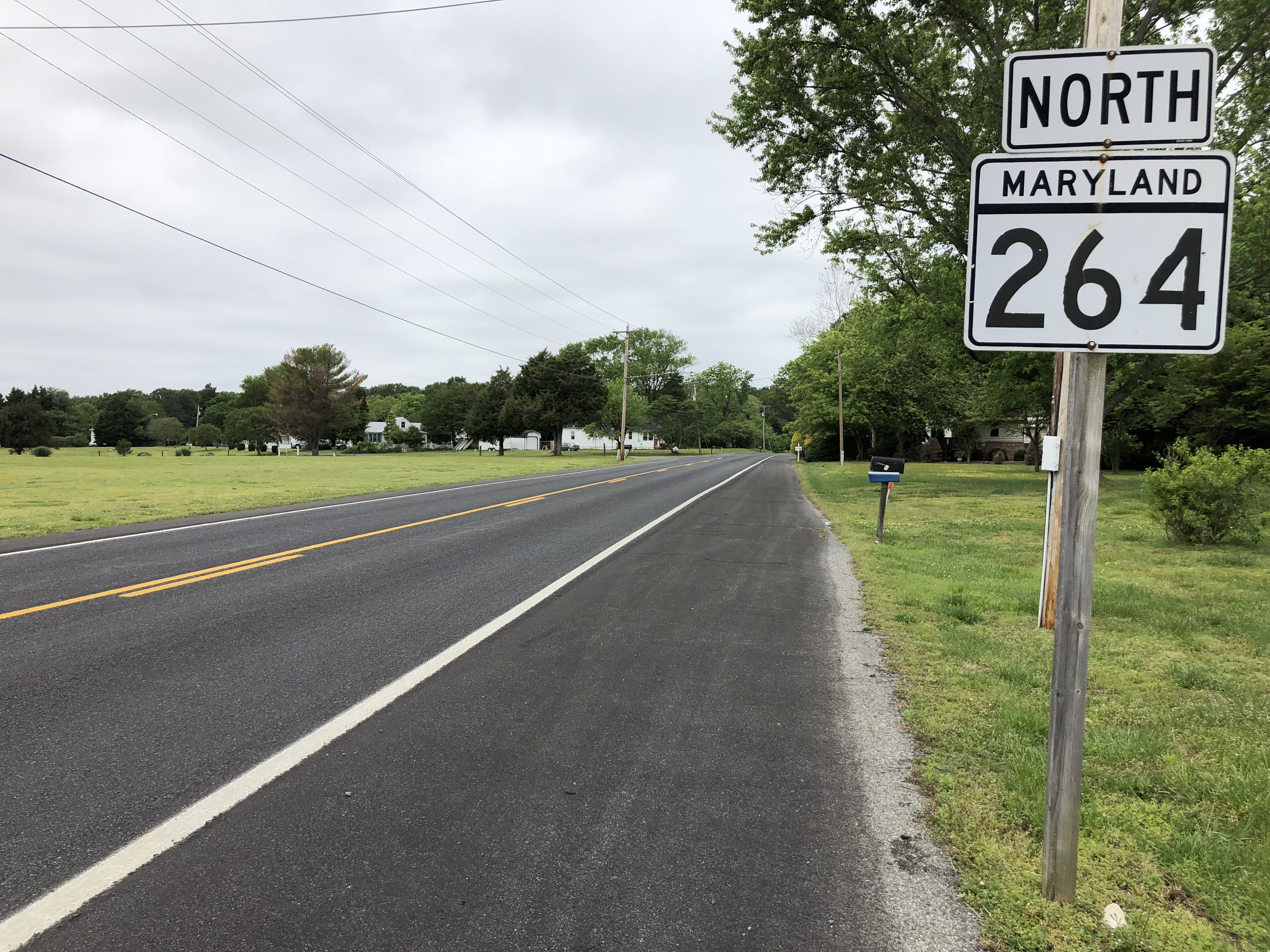
View north along MD 264 in Broomes Island

MD 264 begins at the intersection of Ballard Rogers Road and Oyster House Road in Broomes Island. Ballard Rogers Road continues south to the end of the peninsula between Island Creek and the Patuxent River that contains the village of Broomes Island, a former oyster canning center. MD 264 heads north as a two-lane undivided road out of the village through a mix of farmland and forest toward the community of Island Creek, where the highway intersects Parkers Wharf Road and Williams Wharf Road. In the village of Mutual, the state highway intersects the northern terminus of MD 265 (Mackall Road) and Laveille Road, which leads west to the historic home La Veille. North of Mutual, MD 264 passes west of Christ Church, which with a founded date of 1672 is the oldest church in Calvert County. The state highway passes a spur of old alignment, Yoes Corner Road (unsigned MD 264A), and reaches its northern terminus at a directional crossover intersection with MD 2/MD 4 (Solomons Island Road) in Port Republic. There is no direct access between MD 264 and MD 765 (St. Leonard Road), which meets the northbound direction of MD 2/MD 4 at an adjacent right-in/right-out intersection.

== History ==
MD 264 was constructed as a gravel road around 1923. The state highway followed the alignment of Yoes Corner Road to MD 2/MD 4 until the northern end was moved opposite the northern terminus of the St. Leonard – Port Republic segment of MD 765 around 1985. MD 264's northern terminus was changed from a standard intersection to a directional crossover intersection in 2006.

== Junction list ==
The entire route is in Calvert County.

Location	mi	km	Destinations	Notes
Broomes Island	0.00	0.00	Ballard Rogers Road south / Oyster House Road east	Southern terminus
Mutual	4.42	7.11	MD 265 south (Mackall Road) – Wallville	Northern terminus of MD 265
Port Republic	6.66	10.72	MD 2 / MD 4 (Solomons Island Road) – Prince Frederick, Solomons	Northern terminus; directional crossover intersection
1.000 mi = 1.609 km; 1.000 km = 0.621 mi

== Auxiliary route ==
MD 264A is the designation for Yoes Corner Lane, a 0.19-mile (0.31 km) two-lane undivided spur that runs from MD 264 north to a cul-de-sac adjacent to MD 2/MD 4 just west of MD 264's northern terminus.
