= Parran =

Parran is a surname. Notable people with the surname include:

- J. D. Parran, American multi-woodwind player, educator and composer
- Royce Parran (born 1985), American basketball player
- Thomas Parran Jr. (1892–1968), American physician and Public Health Service officer
- Thomas Parran Sr. (1860–1955), American politician

See also

- Parran Hall, is an academic building on the campus of the University of Pittsburgh on Fifth Avenue in Pittsburgh, Pennsylvania, United States
- Parran, Maryland, is an unincorporated community located at the crossroads of MD 263, Cox Road, and Emmanuel Church Road in Calvert County, Maryland, United States
