= Maryland Route 263 =

State highway in Maryland, United States

Maryland Route 263
- Plum Point Road
- Maryland Route 263 highlighted in red

Route information
- Maintained by MDSHA
- Length: 6.17 mi (9.93 km)
- Existed: 1927–present
- Tourist routes: Roots and Tides Scenic Byway

Major junctions
- West end: MD 2 / MD 4 near Huntingtown
- MD 261 at Parran
- East end: Plum Point

Location
- Country: United States
- State: Maryland
- Counties: Calvert

Highway system
- Maryland highway system; Interstate; US; State; Scenic Byways
← MD 262	→ MD 264

Maryland Route 263 (MD 263) is a state highway in the U.S. state of Maryland. Known as Plum Point Road, the state highway runs 6.17 miles (9.93 km) from MD 2/MD 4 near Huntingtown east to a dead end at Plum Point. MD 263 also connects Prince Frederick with the northeastern Calvert County towns of Chesapeake Beach and North Beach; access to the towns is provided through a connection with MD 261 at Parran. The state highway was constructed in the late 1920s.

== Route description ==
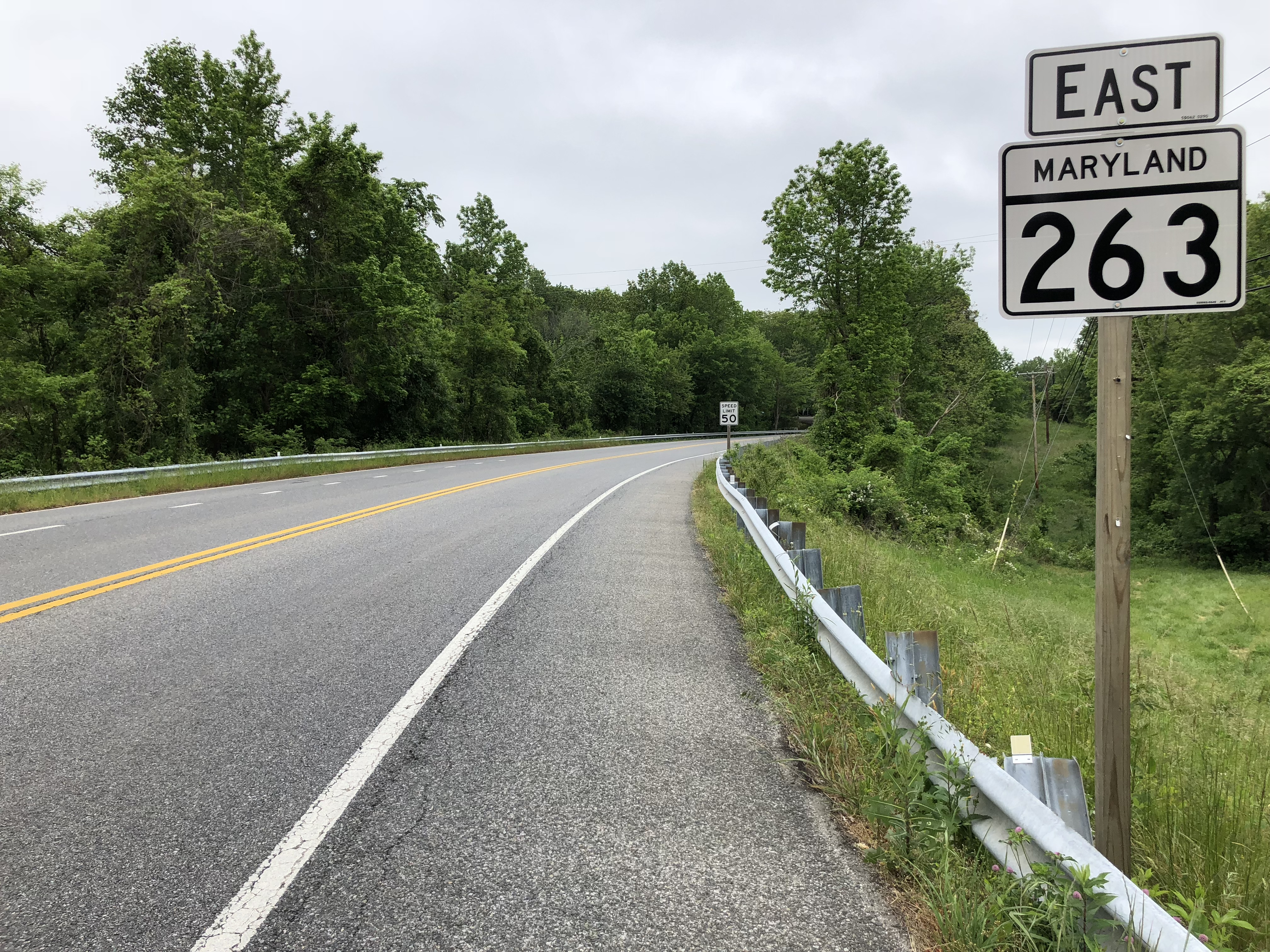
View east along MD 263 at Cox Road in Parran

MD 263 begins at a directional crossover intersection with MD 2/MD 4, which run concurrently as Solomons Island Road, about 3 miles (4.8 km) north of Prince Frederick. The state highway heads northeast as a two-lane undivided road that immediately crosses Hunting Creek and passes through a forested area with scattered residential subdivisions. MD 263 passes by both ends of its old alignment, which is unsigned MD 761 (Old Plum Point Road), on its way to the community of Parran. Within the community, the state highway intersects Emmanuel Church Road, which leads south to the historic home Cornehill. East of Parran, the roadway continues northeast as MD 261 (Willows Road) toward Chesapeake Beach and North Beach while MD 263 veers east toward Plum Point. MD 263 crosses Plum Point Creek and intersects Wilson Road, which heads south toward Dares Beach, in the community of Plum Point. The state highway intersects Ridge Road, which heads north into the center of the beach community, before it reaches its eastern terminus at a dead end just west of the Chesapeake Bay shoreline.

== History ==
MD 263 was constructed as a 15-foot (4.6 m) wide gravel road from MD 2 east to MD 261 in Parran between 1924 and 1927. The state highway was constructed to Plum Point in 1929 and 1930. MD 263 was widened and paved with bituminous concrete from MD 2 to MD 261 around 1959. The directional crossover intersection at the state highway's western terminus with MD 2/MD 4 was installed in 2007.

== Junction list ==
The entire route is in Calvert County.

Location	mi	km	Destinations	Notes
Huntingtown	0.00	0.00	MD 2 / MD 4 (Solomons Island Road) – Prince Frederick, Annapolis, Upper Marlboro	Western terminus
Parran	4.09	6.58	MD 261 north (Willows Road) – Willows, Chesapeake Beach, Breezy Point Beach	Southern terminus of MD 261
Plum Point	6.17	9.93	Dead end at Chesapeake Bay	Eastern terminus
1.000 mi = 1.609 km; 1.000 km = 0.621 mi
