= Maryland Route 262 =

State highway in Maryland, United States

Maryland Route 262
- Lower Marlboro Road
- Maryland Route 262 highlighted in red

Route information
- Maintained by MDSHA
- Length: 4.26 mi (6.86 km)
- Existed: 1927–present

Major junctions
- West end: Chaneyville Road in Lower Marlboro
- East end: MD 4 in Sunderland

Location
- Country: United States
- State: Maryland
- Counties: Calvert

Highway system
- Maryland highway system; Interstate; US; State; Scenic Byways
← MD 261	→ MD 263

Maryland Route 262 (MD 262) is a state highway in the U.S. state of Maryland. Known as Lower Marlboro Road, the route runs 4.26 miles (6.86 km) from Chaneyville Road in Lower Marlboro east to MD 4 in Sunderland. MD 262 was constructed in the late 1920s.

== Route description ==
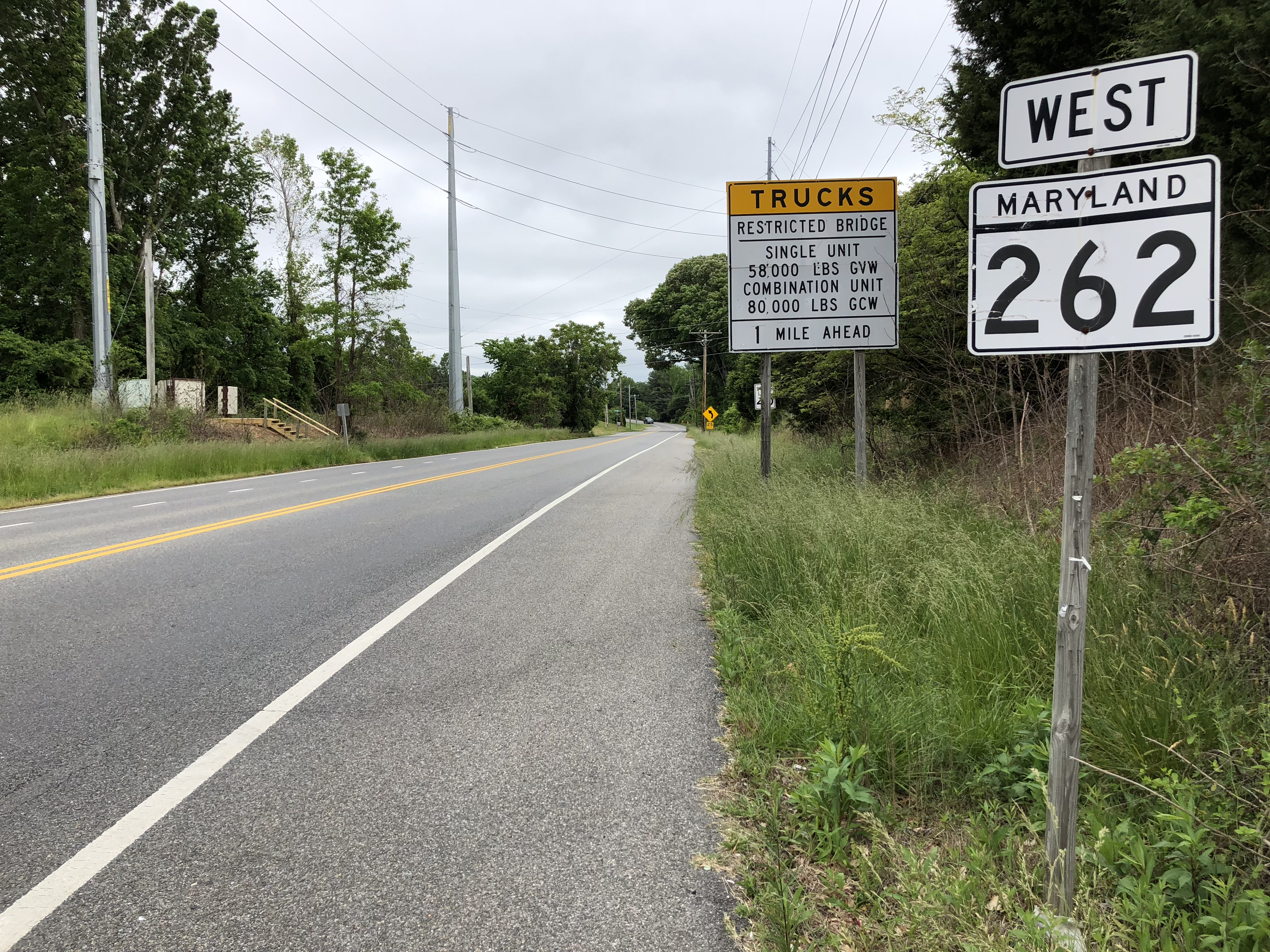
View west along MD 262 past MD 4 in Sunderland

MD 262 begins at an intersection with Chaneyville Road in Lower Marlboro. Lower Marlboro Road continues west a short distance to a pier on the Patuxent River. After passing south of the Grahame House, the state highway heads east as a two-lane undivided road that passes through a forested area with scattered residences. MD 262 crosses Chew Creek just before passing Mill Branch Road. The state highway passes Huntingtown Road before reaching its eastern terminus at a directional crossover intersection with MD 4 (Southern Maryland Boulevard) in Sunderland. Traffic from MD 262 cannot continue across the intersection to continue following Lower Marlboro Road to MD 2 (Solomons Island Road); instead, traffic must follow MD 4 south to its intersection with MD 2.

== History ==
MD 262 was constructed as a gravel road from MD 2 in Sunderland starting in 1924. The state highway was built to just west of Chew Creek in 1927. MD 262 was completed to Lower Marlboro in 1928. Aside from maintenance and paving, the state highway changed very little until 2003, when a directional crossover intersection was constructed at MD 4. The section of Lower Marlboro Road between MD 4 and MD 2 was redesignated MD 262A.

== Junction list ==
The entire route is in Calvert County.

Location	mi	km	Destinations	Notes
Lower Marlboro	0.00	0.00	Chaneyville Road north	Western terminus
Sunderland	4.26	6.86	MD 4 (Southern Maryland Boulevard) to MD 2 (Solomons Island Road) – Prince Frederick, Upper Marlboro, Annapolis	Eastern terminus
1.000 mi = 1.609 km; 1.000 km = 0.621 mi

== Auxiliary route ==
MD 262A (signed as MD 262) is the designation of the 0.21-mile (0.34 km) section of two-lane undivided Lower Marlboro Road that runs from a right-in/right-out interchange with northbound MD 4 east to MD 2 south of a park and ride lot serving MTA Maryland commuter buses. MD 262A provides access to All Saints' Church in the triangle of land formed by MD 2, MD 4, and MD 262A.
