= St. Peter's Chapel =

Chapel in Solomons, Maryland, United States

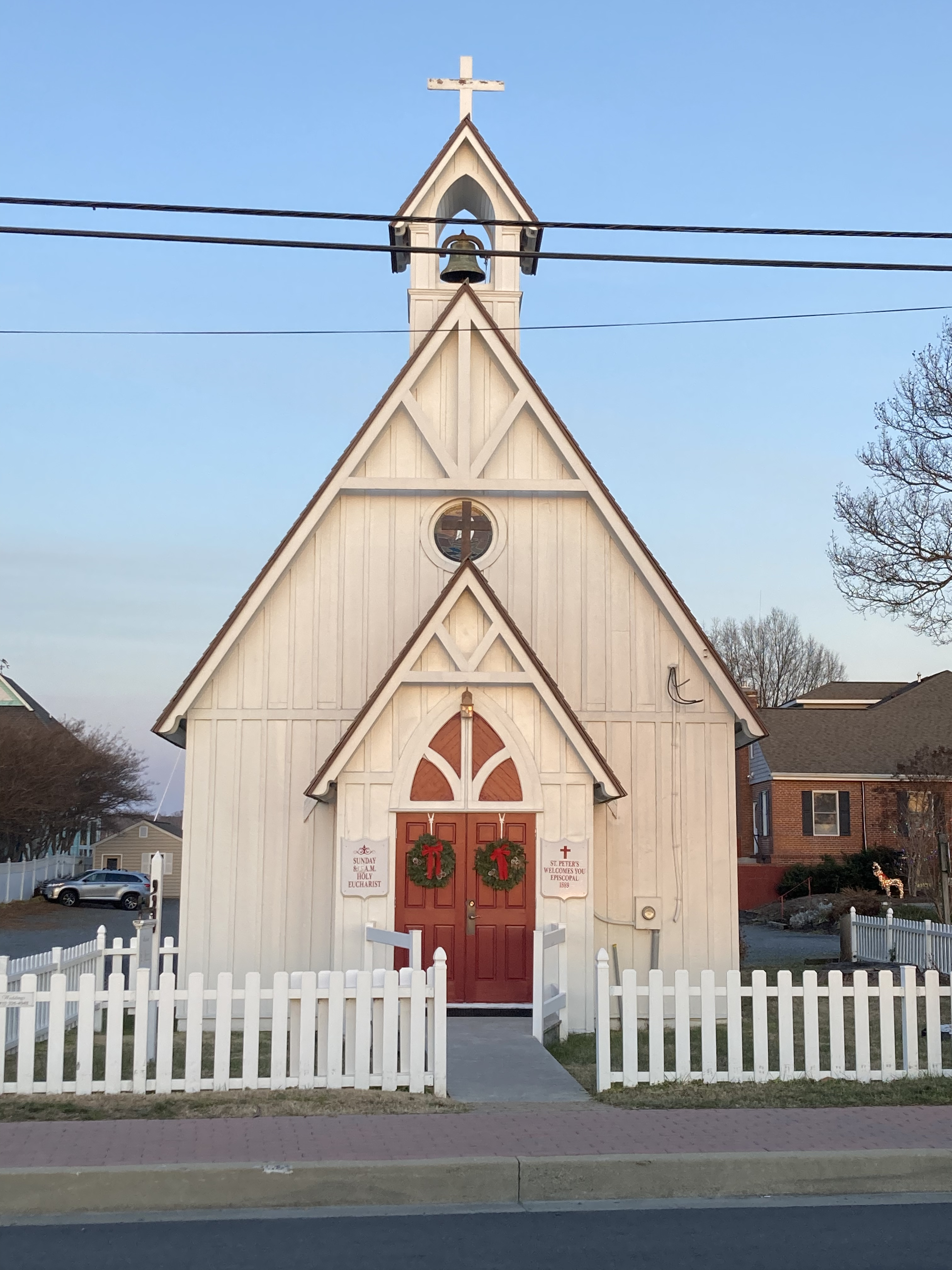

General information
- Architectural style: Carpenter Gothic
- Location: 14590 Solomon's Island Road, South; Solomons, Maryland, United States
- Coordinates: 38°19′14″N 76°27′29.5″W
- Completed: 1889

Technical details
- Structural system: one-story wood frame

St. Peter's Chapel is an historic Carpenter Gothic-style Episcopal church building located at 14590 Solomon's Island Road, South, in Solomons, Calvert County, Maryland. Built in 1889, it features the steep roof, lancet windows and board and batten siding typical of Carpenter Gothic churches. In 1900 it joined with Middleham Chapel to form Middleham and St. Peter's Episcopal Parish in the Episcopal Diocese of Maryland. St. Peter's Chapel is still in use today. The parish's current rector is the Rev. David Showers.
