= Mutual, Maryland =

Unincorporated community in Maryland, U.S.

- Unincorporated community
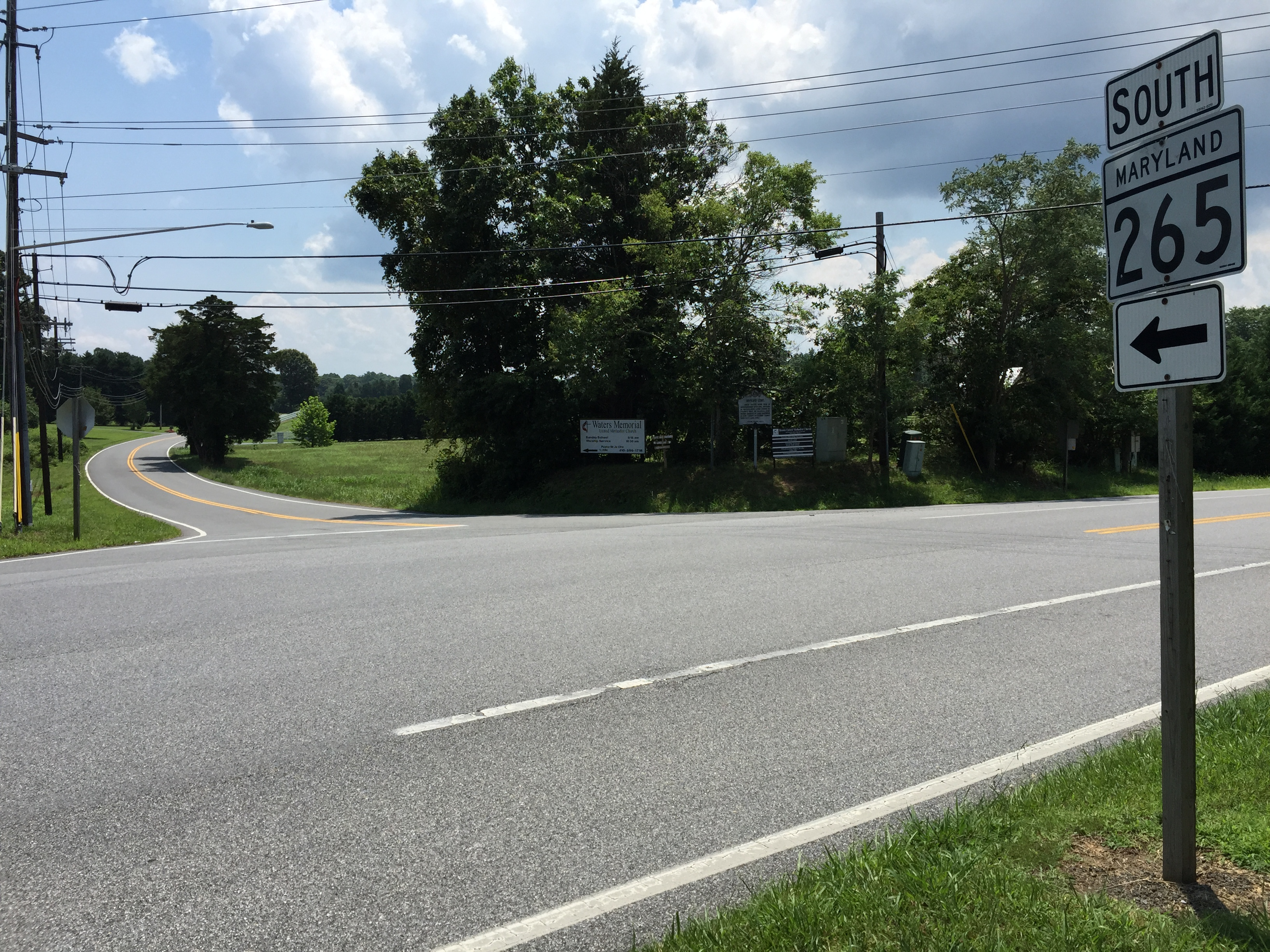
- Crossroads of MD 264 & MD 265

- Location within Maryland Location within the United States
- Coordinates: 38°28′15″N 76°32′53″W
- Country: United States
- State: Maryland
- County: Calvert
- Time zone: UTC-5 (Eastern (EST))
  - Summer (DST): UTC-4 (EDT)

Mutual, or Mutual Consent, is an unincorporated community located at the crossroads of MD 264, MD 265, Ball Road, Grays Road, and Laveille Road in Calvert County, Maryland, United States. La Veille was listed on the National Register of Historic Places in 1973.
