= Johnstown, Maryland =

Unincorporated community in Maryland, U.S.

- Unincorporated community
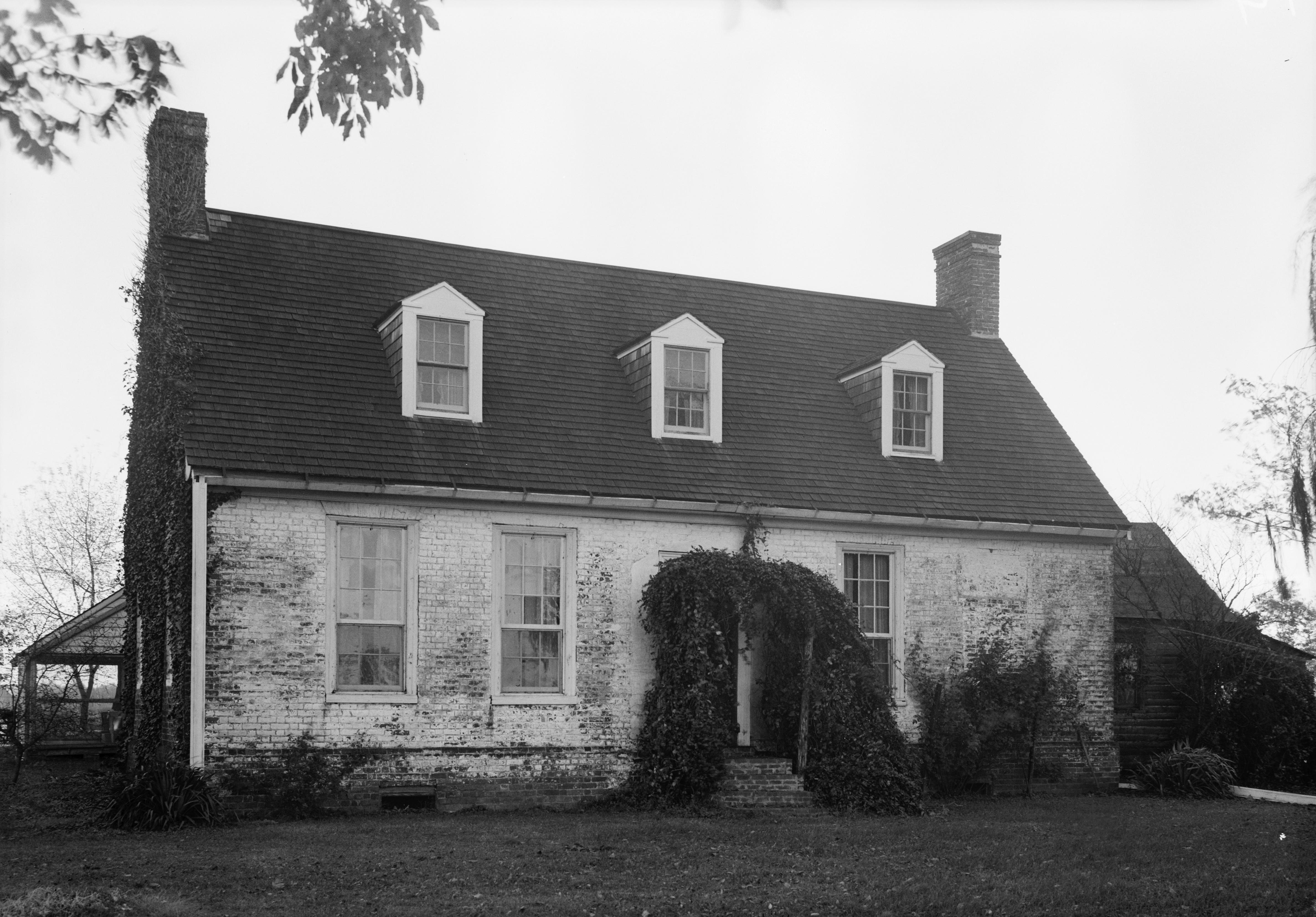
- Preston-on-the-Patuxent house

- Location within Maryland Location within the United States
- Coordinates: 38°19′44″N 76°27′49″W
- Country: United States
- State: Maryland
- County: Calvert
- Time zone: UTC-5 (Eastern (EST))
  - Summer (DST): UTC-4 (EDT)

Johnstown is an unincorporated community in Calvert County, Maryland, United States. The historic Preston-on-the-Patuxent house was listed on the National Register of Historic Places in 1974.
