= Sunderland, Maryland =

Unincorporated community in Maryland, United States

- Unincorporated community
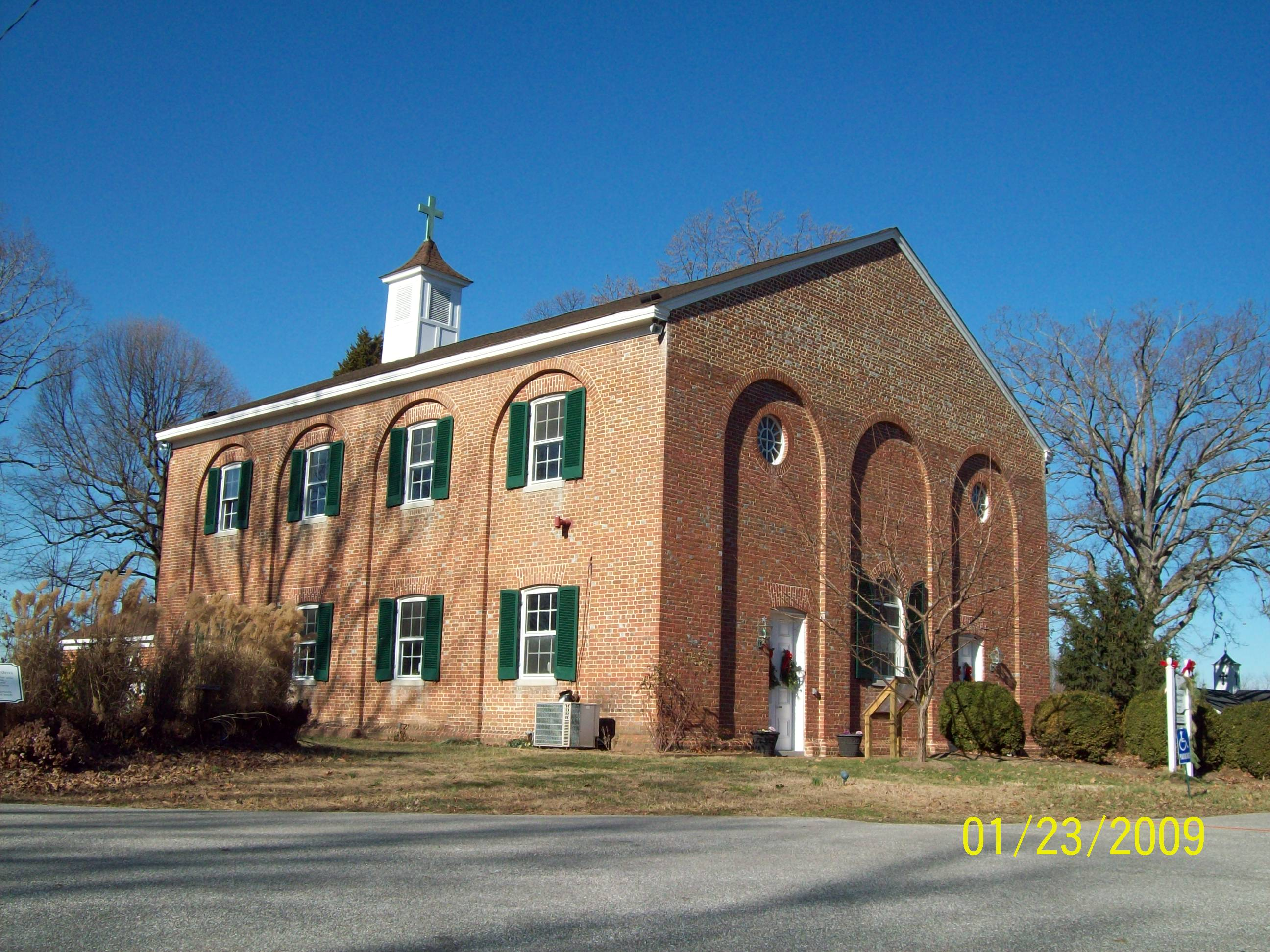
- All Saints' Church

- Location within Maryland
- Coordinates: 38°40′16″N 76°35′53″W
- Country: United States
- State: Maryland
- County: Calvert
- Elevation: 171 ft (52 m)
- Time zone: UTC-5 (Eastern (EST))
  - Summer (DST): UTC-4 (EDT)
- ZIP code: 20689
- Area codes: 410, 443, and 667
- GNIS feature ID: 591378

Sunderland is an unincorporated community located at the crossroads of Maryland routes 2, 4, and 262, Dalrymple and Pushaw Station roads in Calvert County, Maryland, United States, approximately five miles south of Dunkirk and 10 miles north of Prince Frederick. Although Sunderland is not incorporated and does not have a central business district, it does have a zip code, 20689. However, as of November 2007, the former Sunderland post office had closed its doors due to a lease dispute, without opening a new location, and postal officials are determining where to locate a new post office.

All Saints' Church, circa 1774-1777, was listed on the National Register of Historic Places in 1973. The Joseph D. Lyons House was listed in 1998.
