= Joseph D. Lyons House =

Historic house in Maryland, United States

- U.S. National Register of Historic Places
- Location within Maryland Location within the United States
- Nearest city: Sunderland, Maryland
- Coordinates: 38°40′38″N 76°35′54″W
- Area: 14.2 acres (5.7 ha)
- Built: 1924
- Architect: Lyons, Gibson & Company
- Architectural style: Colonial Revival
- NRHP reference No.: 98000839
- Added to NRHP: July 22, 1998

The Joseph D. Lyons House is a historic home in Sunderland, Calvert County, Maryland, United States that is listed on the National Register of Historic Places. It is privately owned and not open to the public.

It is a large, two-story frame structure with a hip roof and full-width front and rear porches. The house is five bays in width, front and back, and four in depth on both sides, with all of the openings evenly spaced and precisely aligned at both floor levels. It was completed in 1924, and built in Colonial Revival-style by a local contracting firm known as Lyons, Gibson & Company who were responsible for many of Calvert County's more important early-20th century public buildings and private residences. A number of agricultural buildings contemporary with the house survive, including a garage, several sheds, and a sprawling, multi-use bank barn.

The Joseph D. Lyons House was listed on the National Register of Historic Places in 1998.
