= Old Colony Cove Site =

- U.S. National Register of Historic Places
- Nearest city: Rose Haven, Maryland
- NRHP reference No.: 78001442
- Added to NRHP: November 21, 1978

The Old Colony Cove Site is an archaeological site near Rose Haven in Anne Arundel County, Maryland. The site consists of a shell midden and is 2,000 feet (610 m) long by 300 feet (91 m) wide.

It was listed on the National Register of Historic Places in 1978.
