= Preston-on-the-Patuxent =

Historic house in Maryland, United States

- U.S. National Register of Historic Places
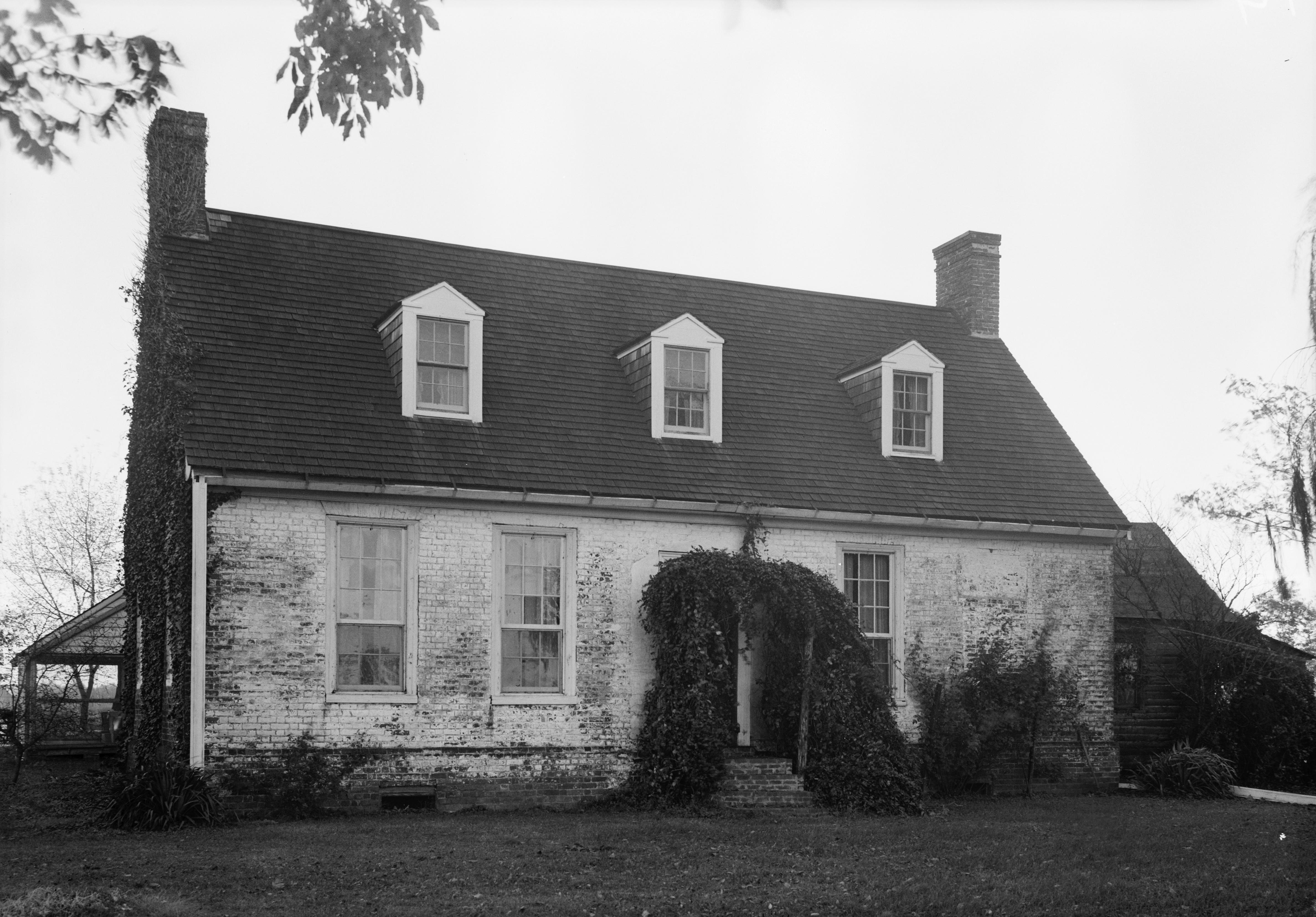
- Preston-on-the-Patuxent, 1936 HABS Photo

- Location within Maryland Location within the United States
- Nearest city: Johnstown, Maryland
- Coordinates: 38°22′20″N 76°29′6″W
- NRHP reference No.: 74000943
- Added to NRHP: October 9, 1974

Preston-on-the-Patuxent is a historic home located at Johnstown, Calvert County, Maryland, United States. It is a modest 1 1/2-story brick house which has had several later additions made to it. While the home has a traditional construction date of about 1651, there is no structural evidence to indicate a date earlier than about 1725. It has been reported by Puritan knowledge that the original Preston home burned down in 1672, to be replaced by the present structure at a later date. Preston-on-the-Patuxent is popularly, if erroneously, known as the seat of the government of Maryland from 1654 to 1657, during the Puritan regime. The belief that the property was the "capital" comes from evidence that the Council, the Assembly, and the Provincial Court met "at Patuxent" in the 1650s. Richard Preston, a participant in each of the three bodies, most probably hosted their meetings in his dwelling located near the Patuxent River.

Preston-on-the-Patuxent was listed on the National Register of Historic Places in 1974.

== See also ==
- List of the oldest buildings in Maryland
