= Rose Haven, Maryland =

Unincorporated community in Maryland, United States

Rose Haven
- Unincorporated community
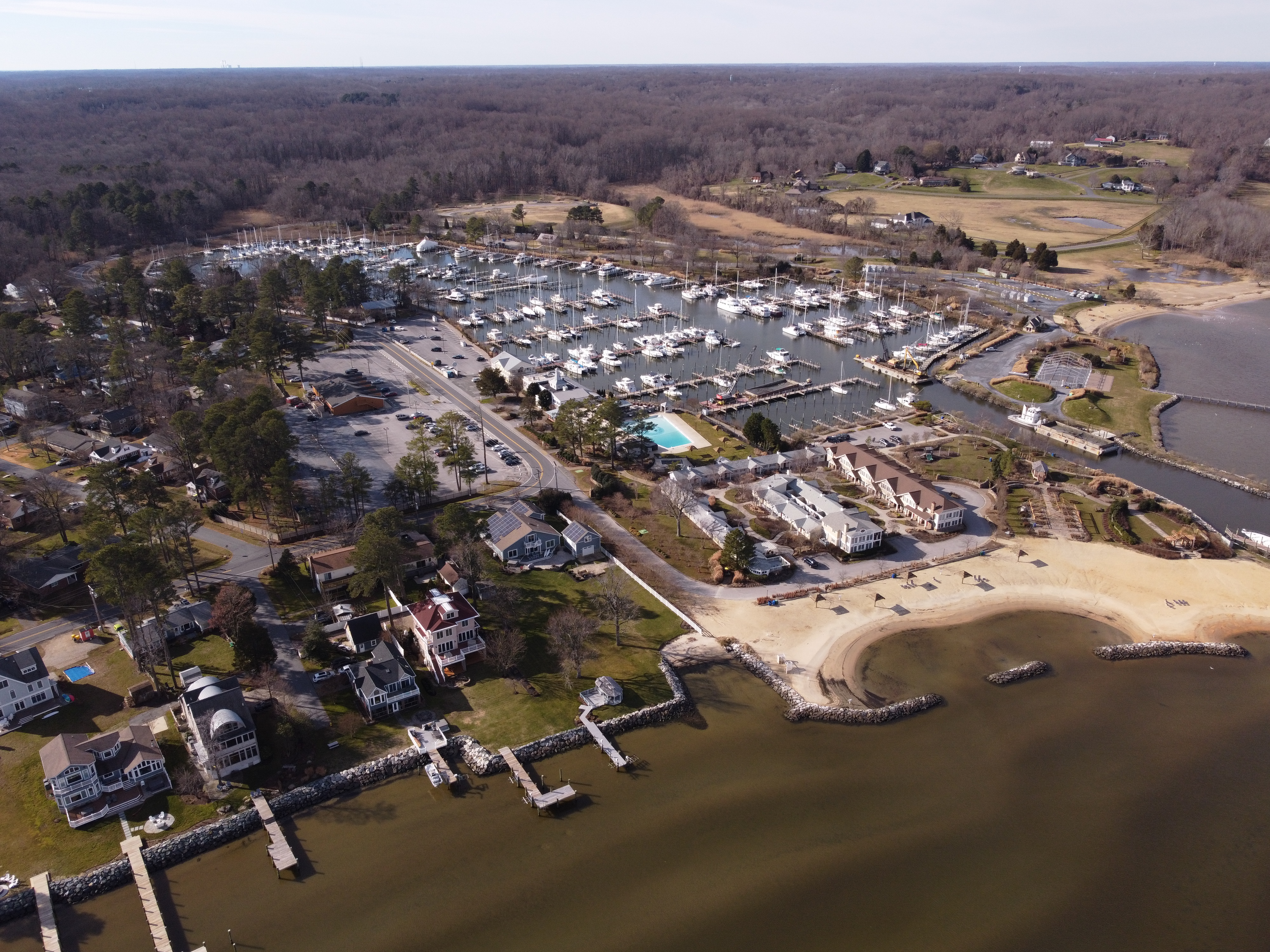

- Location within the state of Maryland Rose Haven (the United States)
- Coordinates: 38°43′32″N 76°32′20″W
- Country: United States
- State: Maryland
- County: Anne Arundel
- Time zone: UTC-5 (Eastern (EST))
  - Summer (DST): UTC-4 (EDT)

Rose Haven is an unincorporated community in Anne Arundel County, Maryland, United States. Old Colony Cove Site was listed on the National Register of Historic Places in 1978.

Herrington Harbor resort and marina are the largest privately owned marinas in Maryland. Voted "Best Resort Marina on the Bay" and "Best Boatyard on the Bay" by Chesapeake Bay Magazine readers. The two marinas, yacht club and resort lodging are located at the southernmost end of Rose Haven.
