= Lower Marlboro, Maryland =

Unincorporated community in Maryland, U.S.

Coordinates: 38.655388°N 76.67985°W

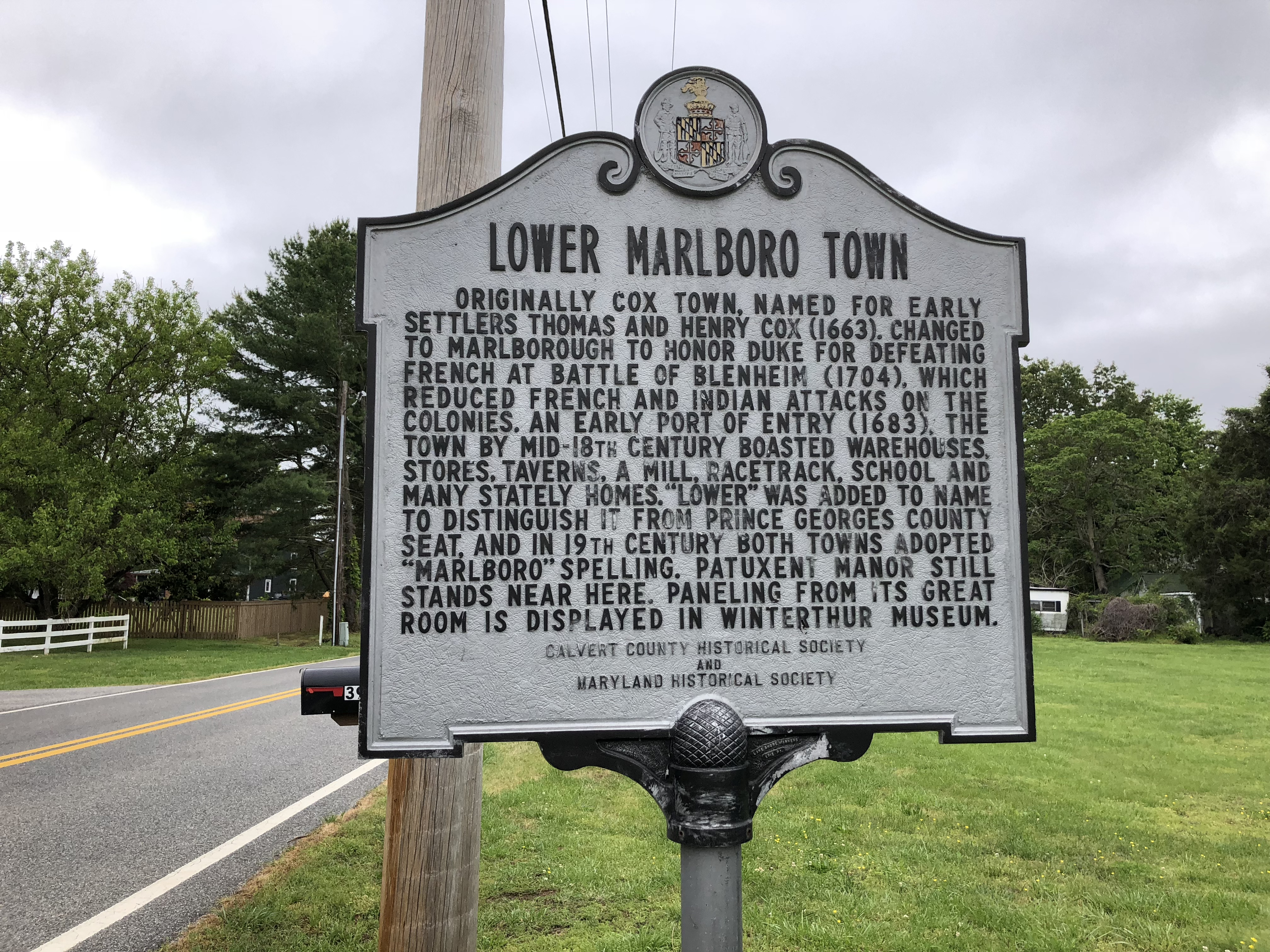
Historical marker about Lower Marlboro

Lower Marlboro, (not to be confused with Upper Marlboro, which is approximately 15 miles north) is a small, waterfront unincorporated community located at the crossroads of MD 262 and Chaneyville Road in Calvert County, Maryland, United States, along the east bank of the Patuxent River.

Although Lower Marlboro is not incorporated, does not have a central business district, or even a post office or Zip code, it does possess some substantial history. Throughout the 19th century, Lower Marlboro was considered a port town on the Patuxent River where tobacco was loaded and unloaded for ships. During the War of 1812, Lower Marlboro was burned by the British as they advanced towards Washington, D.C. Lower Marlboro still has numerous homes dating back to the early 19th century.

Grahame House was listed on the National Register of Historic Places in 1972.

More recently, Lower Marlboro featured a small, private air strip until the property was sold to homebuilders in the mid 1990s. A golf course and driving range are now located adjacent to the old air field property.

Famous residents of Lower Marlboro include former U.S. Senator and Maryland governor Joseph Kent.
