= Middleham Chapel =

Historic church in Maryland, US

- U.S. National Register of Historic Places
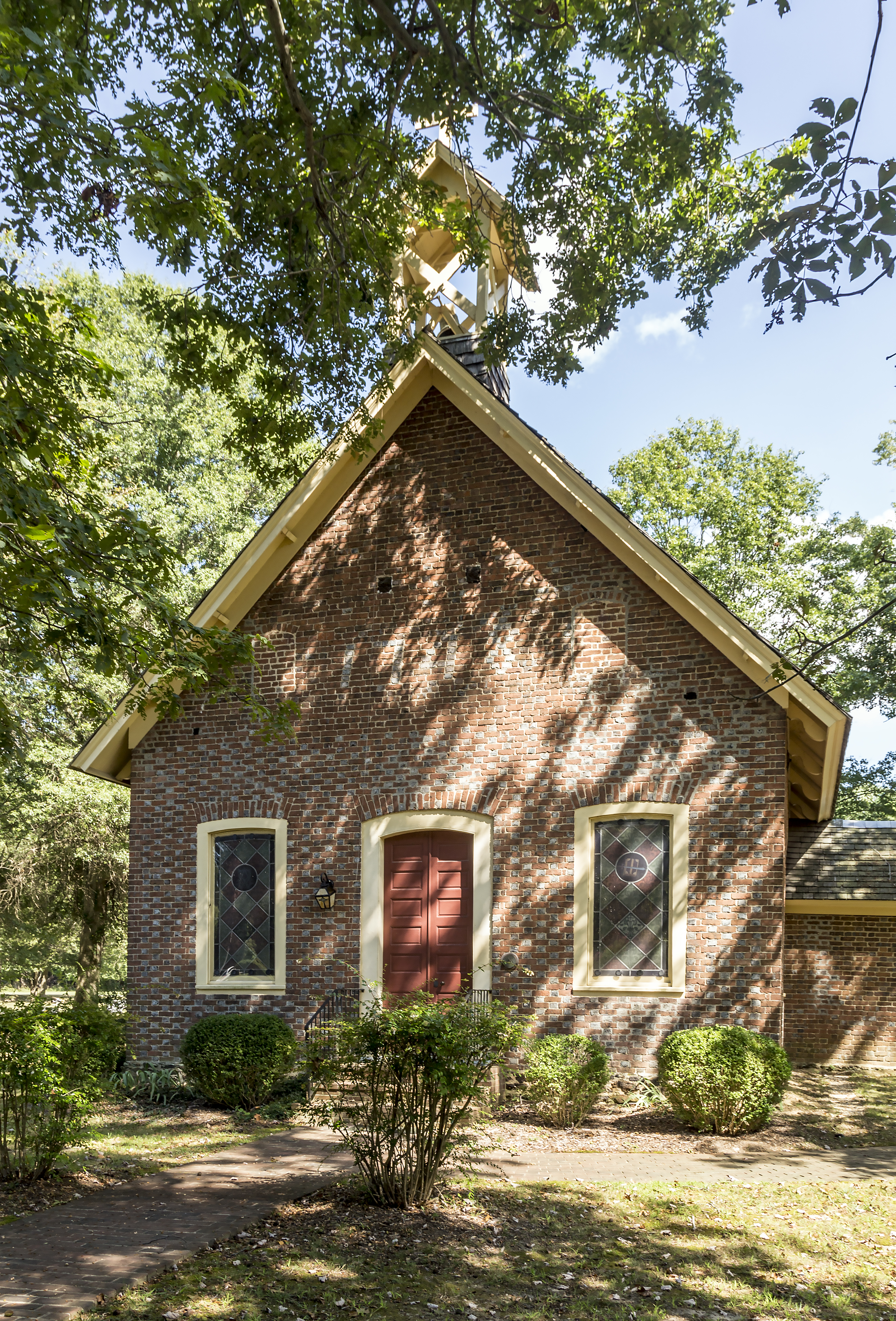
- Middleham Chapel - Front View, 2014

- Location within Maryland Location within the United States
- Location: 10210 H. G. Trueman Road, Lusby, Maryland
- Coordinates: 38°23′56″N 76°26′13″W
- Built: 1748
- NRHP reference No.: 75000870
- Added to NRHP: February 20, 1975

Middleham Chapel is a historic Episcopal church located in Lusby, Calvert County, Maryland. It is a one-story, cruciform, Flemish bond brick structure with exposed fieldstone foundations. It was built in 1748, to replace an earlier frame or log structure believed to have been erected as early as 1684, as a Chapel of Ease of Christ Church Parish. The date of construction is worked into the brick on the front of the church.

It was listed on the National Register of Historic Places in 1975.

Middleham Chapel is still in use today. In 1900 it joined with nearby St. Peter's Chapel to form Middleham and St. Peter's Episcopal Parish in the Episcopal Diocese of Maryland. The parish's current rector is the Rev. David Showers.

== Gallery ==
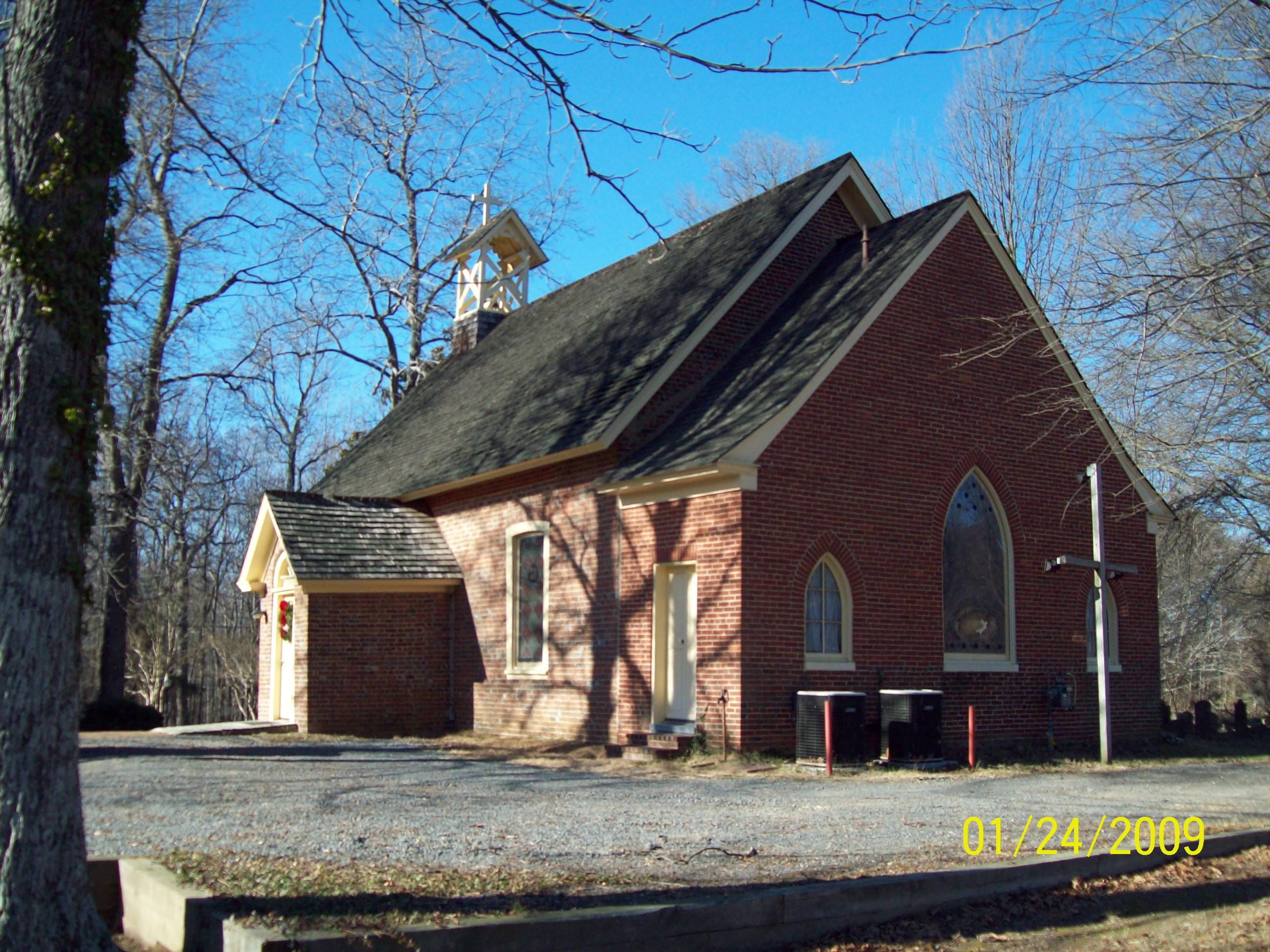
Middleham Chapel - Rear View, December 2008

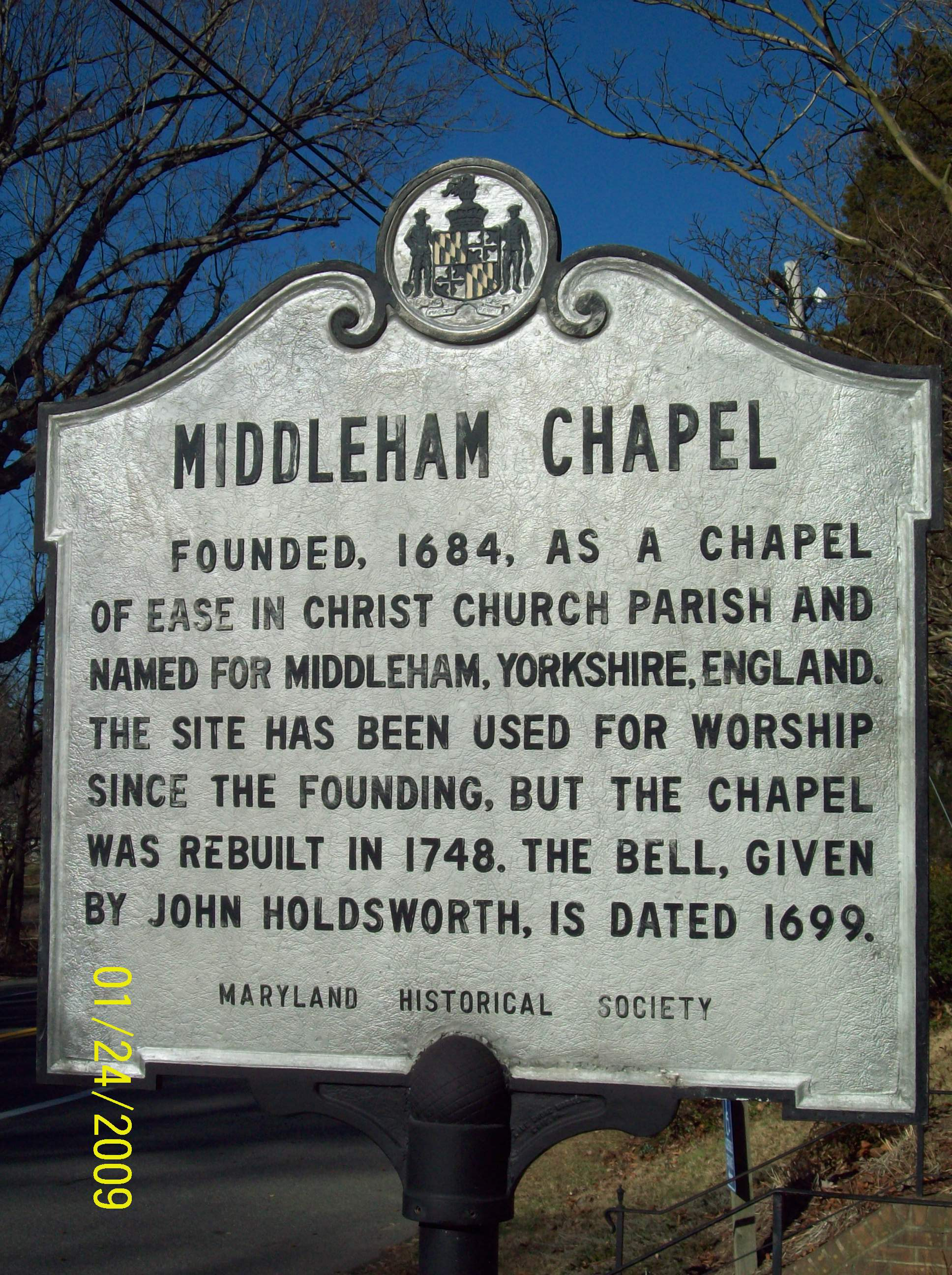
Middleham Chapel - Historic Marker, December 2008
