= Broomes Island, Maryland =

Broomes Island
- Census-designated place
- Location in the state of Maryland
- Coordinates: 38°25′5″N 76°32′38″W
- Country: United States
- State: Maryland
- County: Calvert

Area
  - Total: 0.74 sq mi (1.91 km^{2})
  - Land: 0.73 sq mi (1.88 km^{2})
  - Water: 0.0077 sq mi (0.02 km^{2})
- Elevation: 10 ft (3.0 m)

Population (2020)
  - Total: 379
  - Density: 521.2/sq mi (201.25/km^{2})
- Time zone: UTC−5 (Eastern (EST))
  - Summer (DST): UTC−4 (EDT)
- Area codes: 410, 443, & 667
- GNIS feature ID: 589831

Broomes Island is a small waterfront community and census-designated place (CDP) located at the southern terminus of MD 264 in Calvert County, Maryland, United States, on the Patuxent River. It is located approximately 10 miles (16 km) south of Prince Frederick, the county seat. As of 2019 Census estimates, the population of the CDP was 421.

Although Broomes Island is a rather small community, it does have its own post office and zip code, 20615. In November 2007, the United States Postal Service considered closing the small post office and re-routing all mail delivery through the larger St. Leonard post office branch. After residents contacted US Senator Barbara Mikulski about the proposed closure, the postal service decided against closing the post office.

Broomes Island is located near the mouth of St. Leonard Creek, the largest tributary of the Patuxent River entirely inside Calvert County. It is in the vicinity of Broomes Island that several key naval battles were fought during the War of 1812.

During the early and mid-20th century, Broomes Island had a substantial oyster canning industry. In recent years most residents of Broomes Island commute to other places for work.

Each May, former Maryland State Senator Bernie Fowler has held a "wade-in" at Broomes Island, where he and others would walk into the waters of the Patuxent River until their feet were no longer visible. This was held on the property of Mr. Donald Rogers with his permission. Fowler started the annual tradition to bring awareness to the water clarity levels of the Patuxent. In recent years, the "wade-in" has become a noteworthy public event, with numerous public officials joining Fowler in the walk, including Maryland Governors Martin O'Malley and Robert Ehrlich and U.S. Senator Barbara Mikulski. It no longer takes place at this location. Despite the death of Fowler in 2021, the "wade-in" at Broomes Island remains an annual tradition.

In 2003, Hurricane Isabel caused moderate damage to numerous structures in Broomes Island. Most notably, the last remains of the considerable Broomes Island oyster industry - a large red oyster shucking barn - succumbed. The site of the oyster shucking barn is now part of the local Stoney's sea food restaurant. The site is now a venue for weddings and other functions.

== Demographics ==
Historical population
Census	Pop.	Note	%±
2020	379		—
U.S. Decennial Census
