= All Saints' Church (Sunderland, Maryland) =

Historic church in Maryland, United States

- U.S. National Register of Historic Places
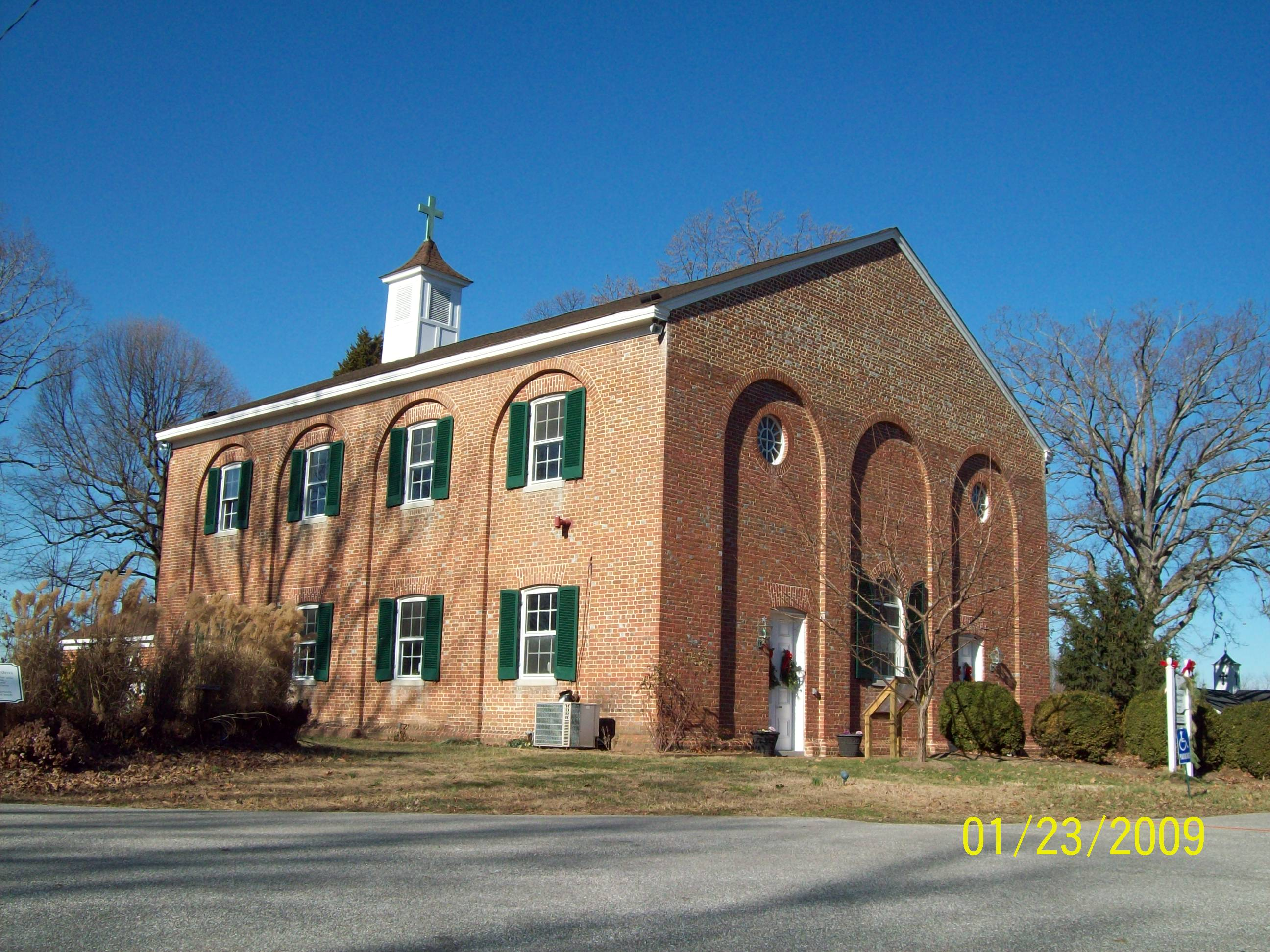
- All Saints' Church - Front View, December 2008

- Location within Maryland Location within the United States
- Nearest city: 100 Lower Marlboro Road, Sunderland, Maryland
- Coordinates: 38°39′42″N 76°36′26″W
- Built: 1774
- Architectural style: Georgian
- NRHP reference No.: 73000908
- Added to NRHP: March 14, 1973

All Saints' Church is a historic Episcopal church located at 100 Lower Marlboro Road (near the intersection of Southern Maryland Boulevard MD 4 and Solomons Island Road MD 2), in Sunderland, Calvert County, Maryland. All Saint's Parish was one of the thirty original Anglican parishes created in 1692 to encompass the Province of Maryland. In 1693 its first parish church, a log structure, was built on an acre of land called Kemp's Desire donated by Thomas Hillary. This log church was expanded in 1703-1704 and repaired at least 4 times before being replaced on top of the hill between MD routes 4, 262, and 2 by the present brick building.

Built between 1774 and 1777, the present church building is a Georgian structure of Flemish bond brick with random glazed headers. Since All Saints' Parish was part of the established church of the Province of Maryland, the published volumes of the Archives of Maryland contain pertinent documented source material on the building, showing that it was built with county taxes while future bishop Thomas Claggett served as its rector.

All Saints' Church was listed on the National Register of Historic Places in 1973.

All Saints' Church remains an active parish in the Episcopal Diocese of Maryland. The current Interim Rector is the Rev. Virginia Tyler Smith.

== Gallery ==
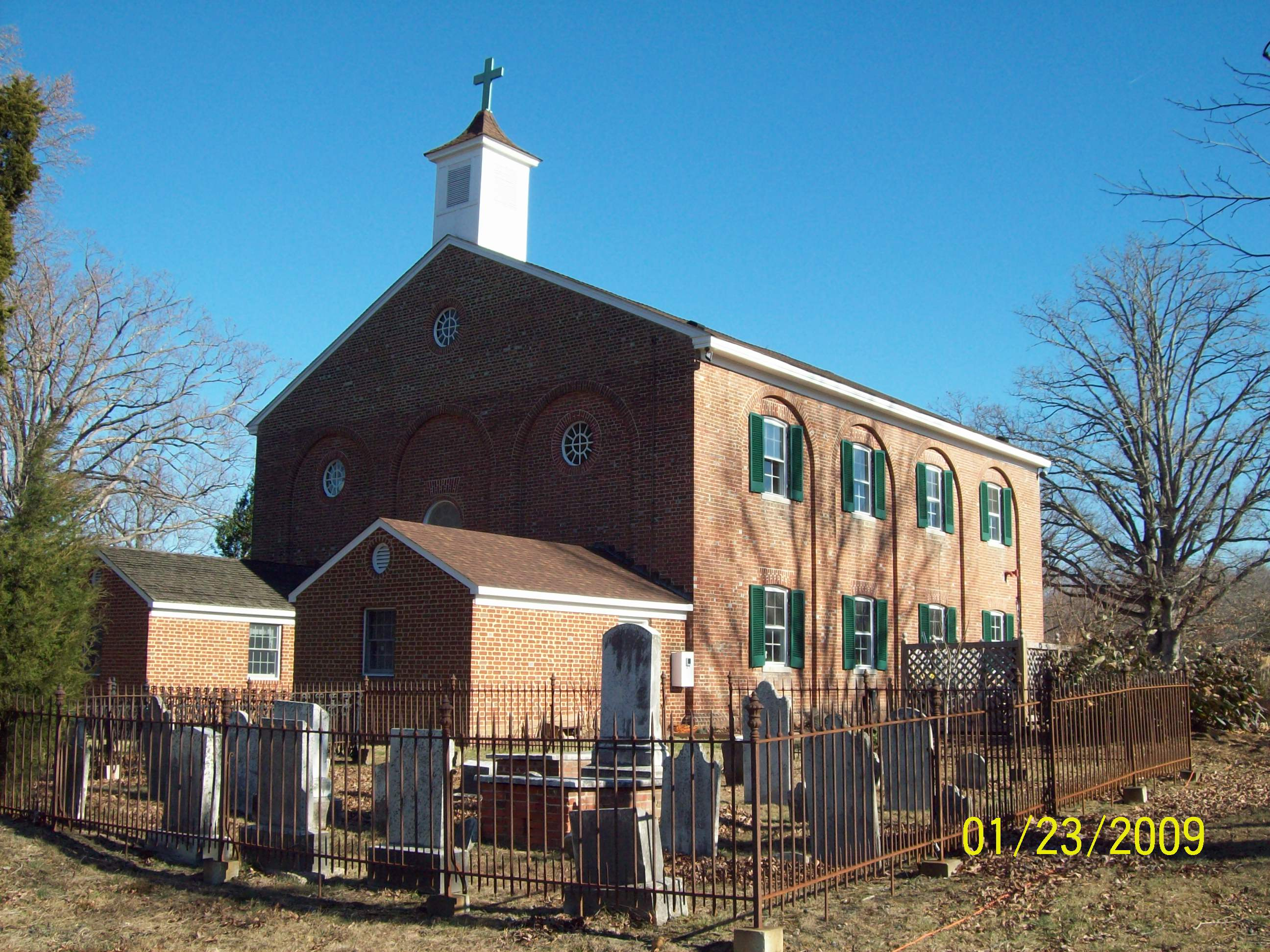
All Saints' Church - Rear View, December 2008

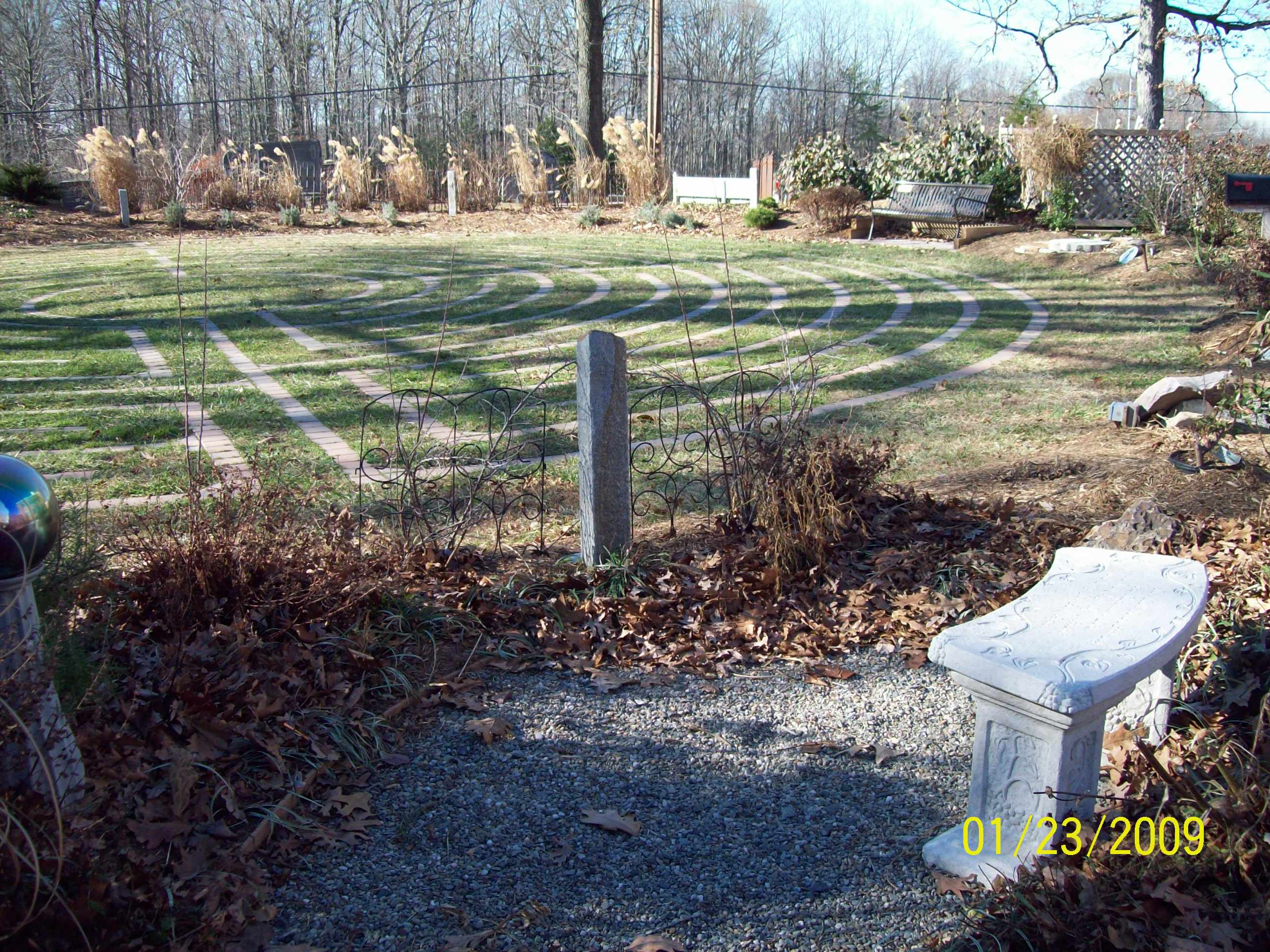
All Saints' Church - Labyrinth, December 2008

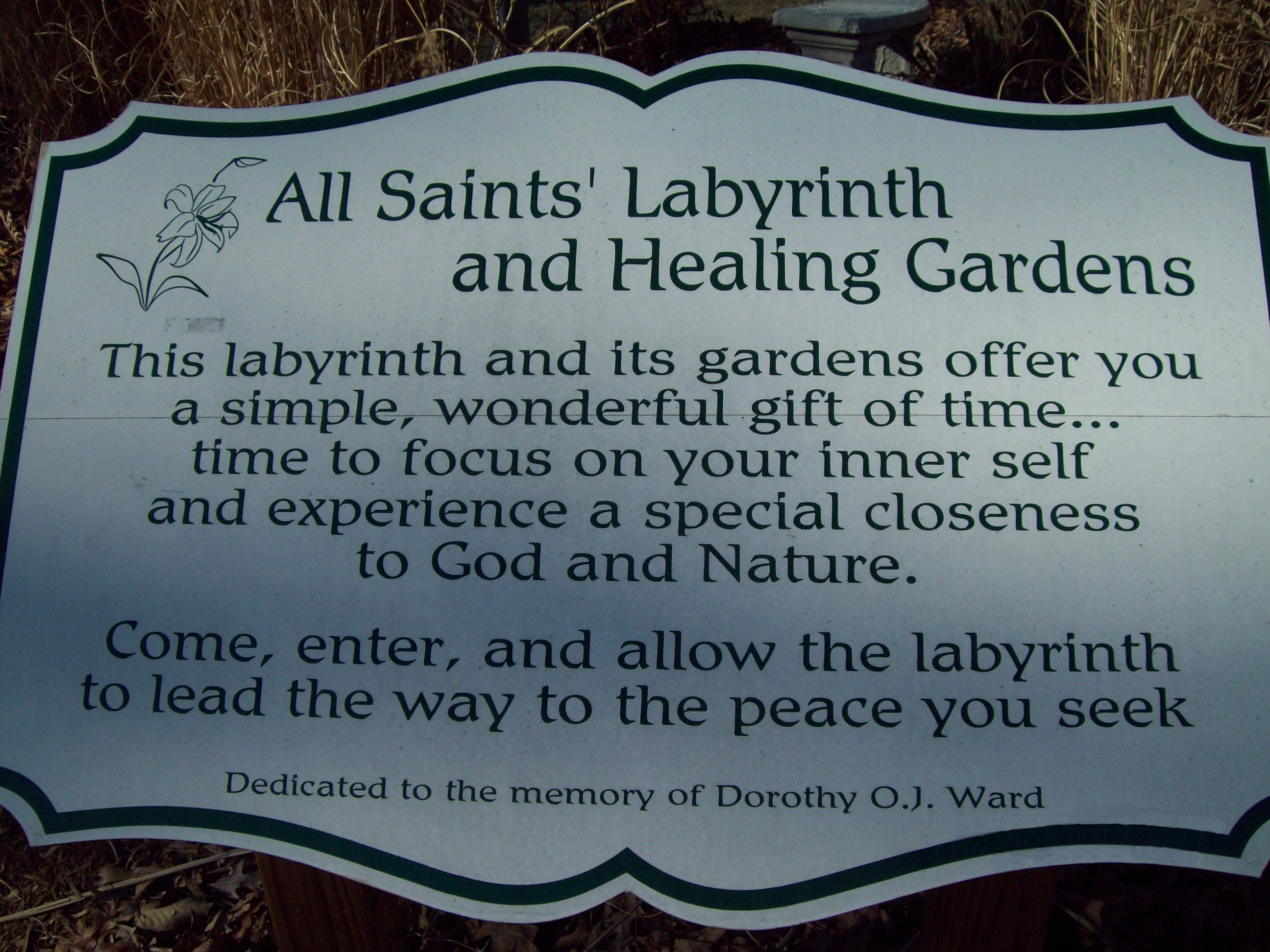
All Saints' Church - Labyrinth Sign, December 2008
