= Christ Church (Port Republic, Maryland) =

Historic church in Maryland, United States

- U.S. National Register of Historic Places
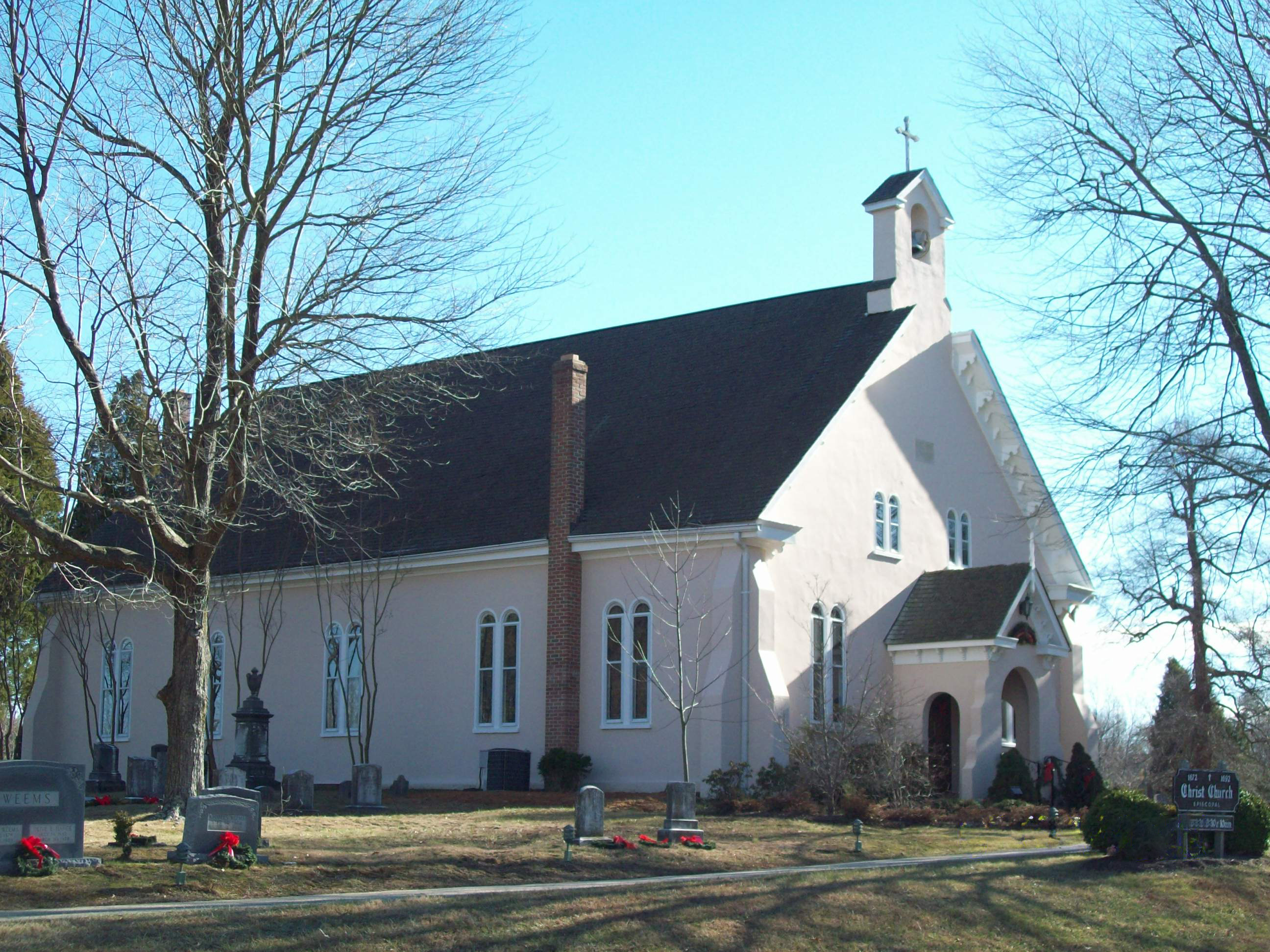
- Christ Church – North Side, December 2008

- Location within Maryland Location within the United States
- Nearest city: Port Republic, Maryland
- Coordinates: 38°29′38″N 76°32′12″W
- Built: 1772
- Architectural style: Gothic Revival
- NRHP reference No.: 75000871
- Added to NRHP: November 12, 1975

The Christ Church is a historic Episcopal church located at Port Republic, Calvert County, Maryland, United States. The church is a three-bay-wide, five bays long, beige stucco covered structure featuring stained glass in most of the tall paired round-arched sash windows. It is the mother Episcopal Church of Calvert County and its oldest continually worshipping congregation. Middleham Chapel was started from this congregation as a Chapel of Ease. Christ Church Parish was one of the original 30 Anglican parishes in the Province of Maryland. Burials in the church cemetery include former U. S. Representative Thomas Parran Sr. and United States Coast Guard Admiral Merlin O'Neill.

Christ Church was listed on the National Register of Historic Places in 1975.

== Gallery ==
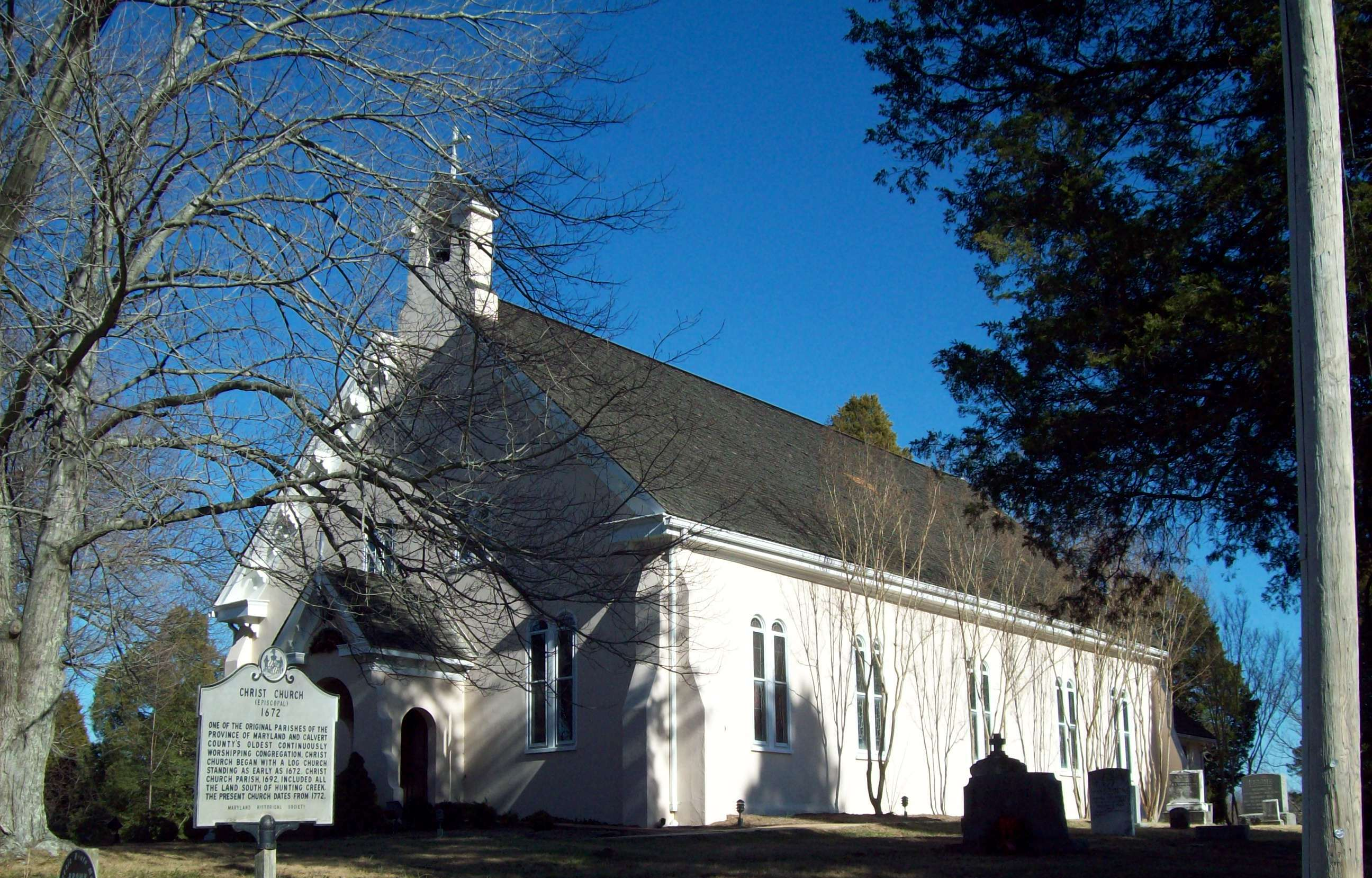
Christ Church - South Side, December 2008

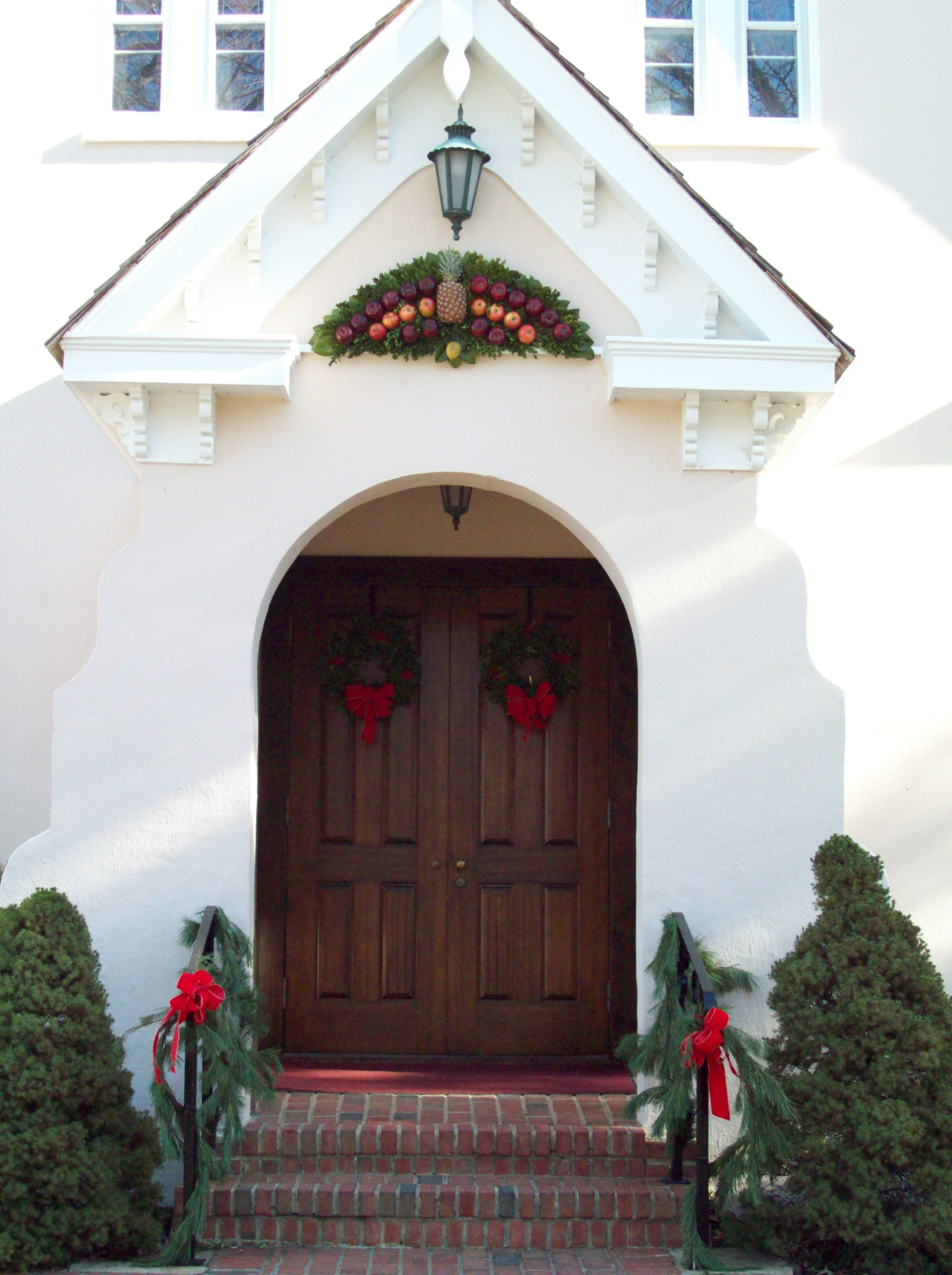
Christ Church - Door Detail, December 2008

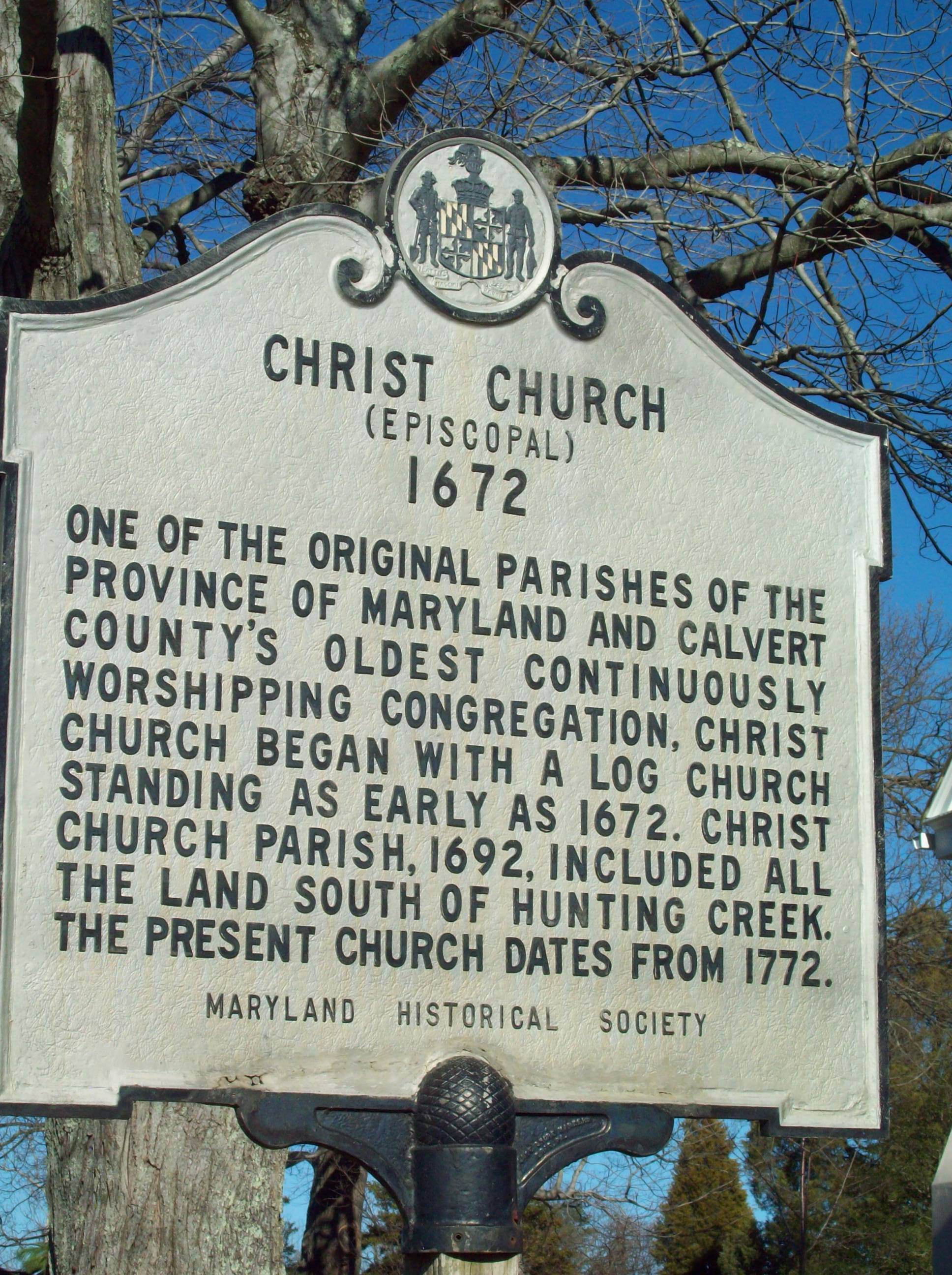
Christ Church - Historic Marker, December 2008
