= Grahame House =

Historic house in Maryland, United States

- U.S. National Register of Historic Places
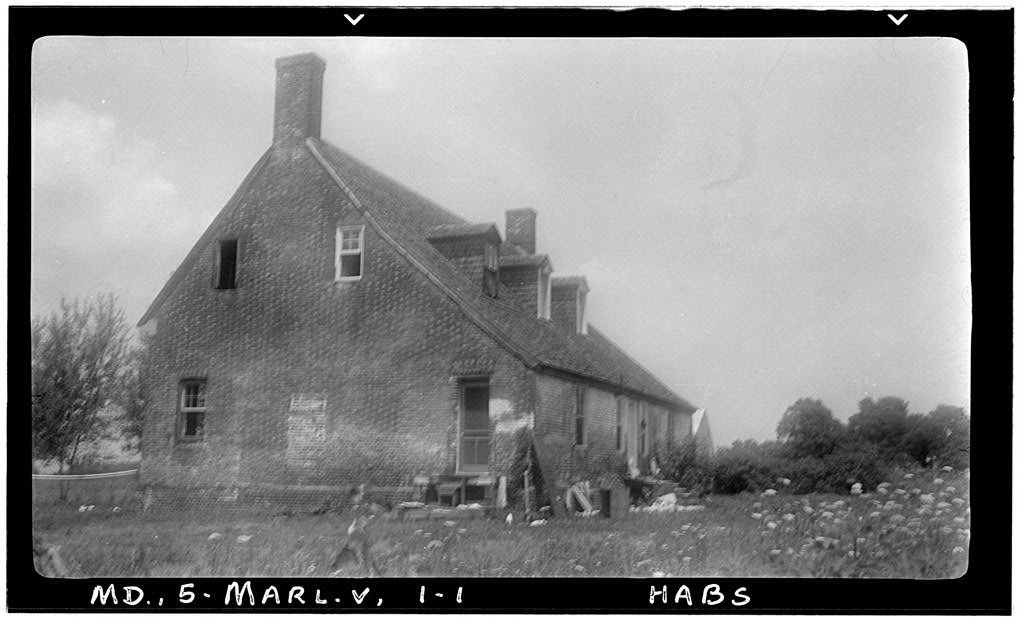
- Grahame House, 1940 HABS Photo

- Location within Maryland Location within the United States
- Location: NE of SR 262 and 523, Lower Marlboro, Maryland
- Coordinates: 38°39′25″N 76°40′42″W
- Built: 1754
- NRHP reference No.: 72000571
- Added to NRHP: April 26, 1972

Grahame House, Graham House, Mansion House, Graeme House, or Patuxent Manor, is a historic home located at Lower Marlboro, Calvert County, Maryland. It is an 18th-century original 1 1/2-story brick shell laid in Flemish bond with a steeply pitched gable roof. Later alterations have included the purchase and removal of the fine paneling throughout the house to the Winterthur Museum, Garden, and Library.

Charles Grahame, for whom the home is named, was associated with Frederick Calvert, 6th Baron Baltimore, through Grahame's brother, David Grahame (who married Calvert's cousin, Charlotte Hyde), and with Thomas Johnson, the first elected governor of the State of Maryland, through Grahame's son (who married Johnson's daughter).

It was listed on the National Register of Historic Places in 1972.
