= La Veille =

Historic house in Maryland, United States

- U.S. National Register of Historic Places
- Location within Maryland Location within the United States
- Nearest city: Mutual, Maryland
- Coordinates: 38°28′33″N 76°35′25″W
- NRHP reference No.: 73000909
- Added to NRHP: September 20, 1973

La Veille, or La Veille Place, is a historic home located at Mutual, Calvert County, Maryland, United States. It is a 1 1/2-story gambrel-roofed brick house, of Flemish bond construction. A number of early-19th-century outbuildings include: a log corn crib, three barns and several small sheds. The Kershaw Family cemetery and the La Veille family cemetery are located within the property with the later of the two, enclosed within an elaborate late-19th-century wrought iron fence.

La Veille was listed on the National Register of Historic Places in 1973.
