= Cornehill =

Historic house in Maryland, United States

- U.S. National Register of Historic Places
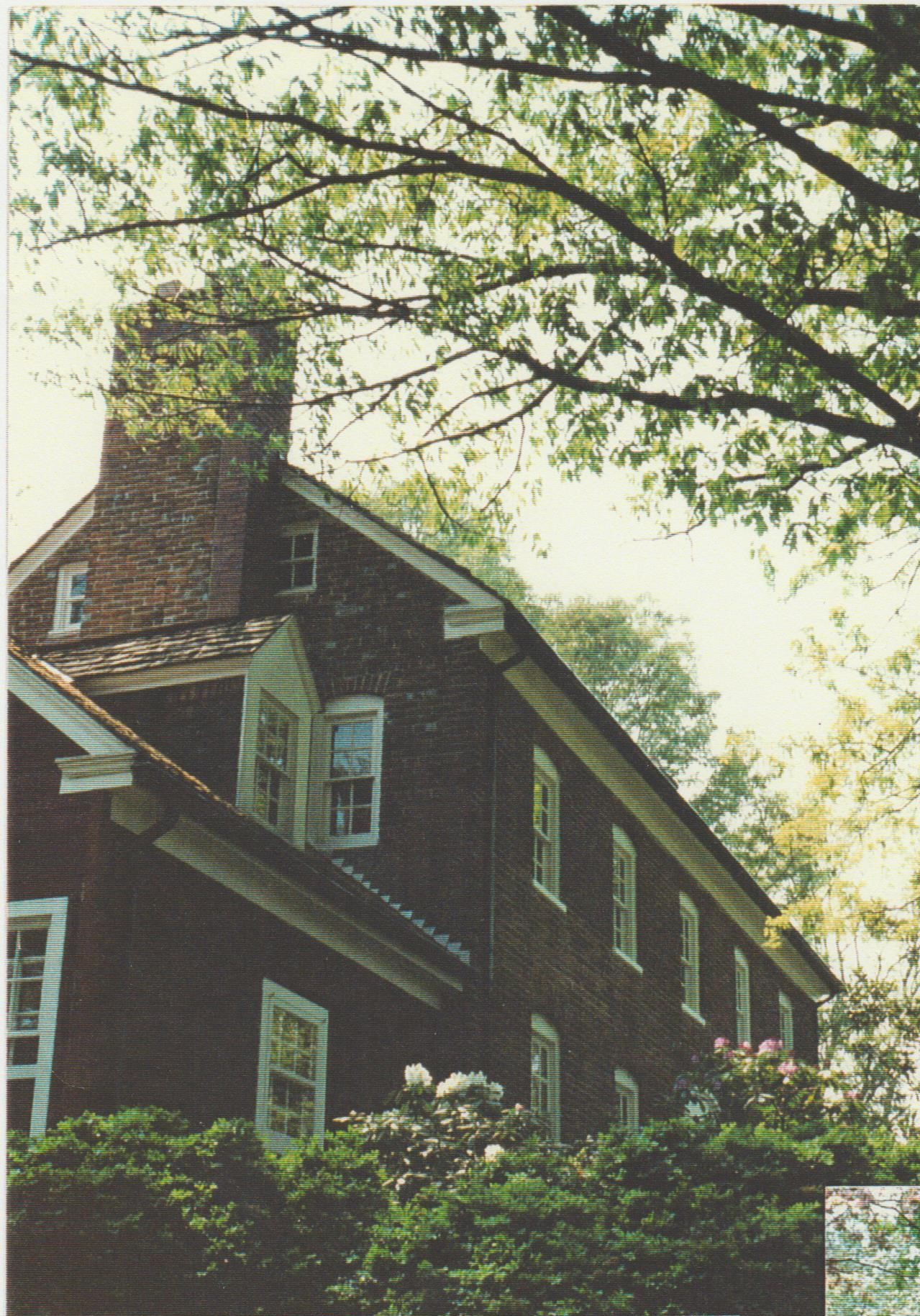

- Location within Maryland Location within the United States
- Location: Emmanuel Church Rd. Parran, Maryland
- Coordinates: 38°35′20″N 76°33′19″W
- Built: 1786
- Architectural style: Georgian
- NRHP reference No.: 72000572
- Added to NRHP: October 31, 1972

Cornehill is a historic home located at Parran, Calvert County, Maryland, United States. It is a five-bay-long two-story Georgian brick house laid in Flemish bond with a steeply pitched gable roof with an exterior chimney at each gable end. One brick on the southwest corner contains the date 1786 and the initials "T.F." The initials purportedly refer to Thelbert Freeland, a member of an influential family in northeastern Calvert County. Outbuildings include slave quarters to the south of the house, and a tobacco barn with oak framing. During the majority of the 18th century, the Mackall family, large Calvert County landowners, held Cornehill, or "Cornhill."

Cornehill was listed on the National Register of Historic Places in 1972.
