= Wallville, Maryland =

Unincorporated community in Maryland, U.S.

Coordinates: 38°24′55″N 76°30′19″W

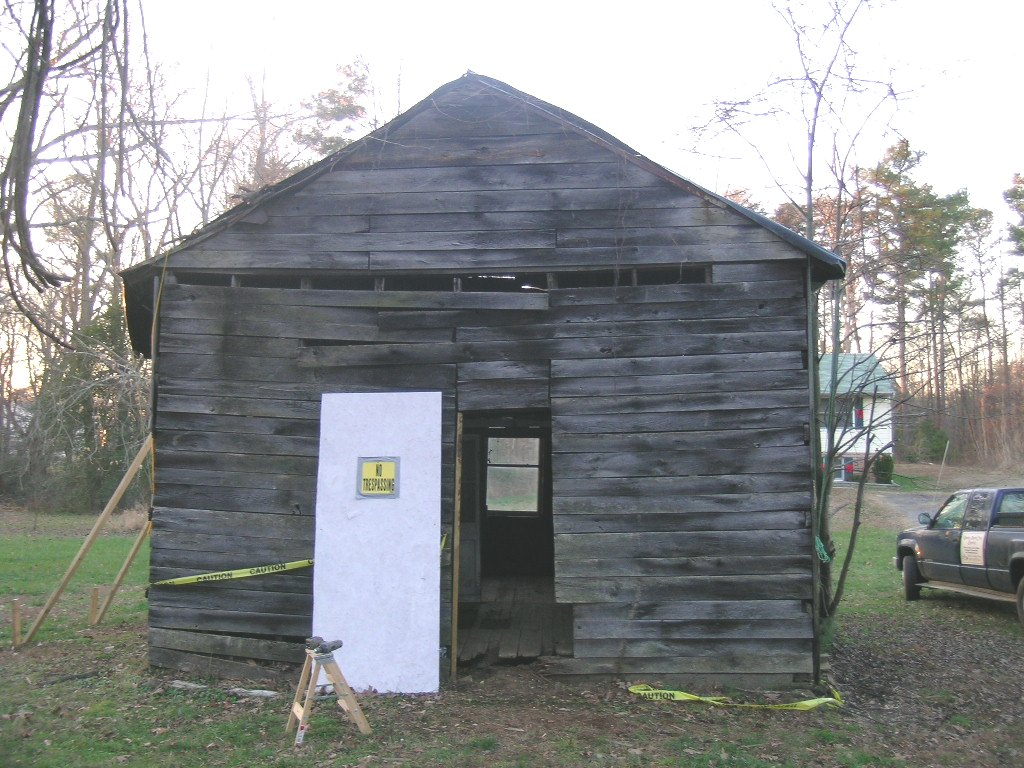
Old Wallville School

Wallville is an unincorporated community located along MD 265 in Calvert County, Maryland, United States. The Patterson's Archeological District was listed on the National Register of Historic Places in 1982.
