= Patterson's Archeological District =

Historic district in Maryland, United States

- U.S. National Register of Historic Places
- U.S. Historic district
- Nearest city: Wallville, Maryland
- NRHP reference No.: 82002808
- Added to NRHP: April 12, 1982

Patterson's Archeological District is a 512-acre (2.07 km^{2}) archaeological site near Wallville in Calvert County, Maryland at the mouth of St. Leonard's Creek, the largest tributary of the tidal portions of the Patuxent River. It contains a representative sample of a range of archeological sites characteristic of both upland and lowland utilization of the Chesapeake Bay tidewater region during the prehistoric and historic periods. The property also contains a range of historic sites.

It was listed on the National Register of Historic Places in 1982. This district is a component of Jefferson Patterson Park & Museum.
