= Parran, Maryland =

Unincorporated community in Maryland, United States

- Unincorporated community
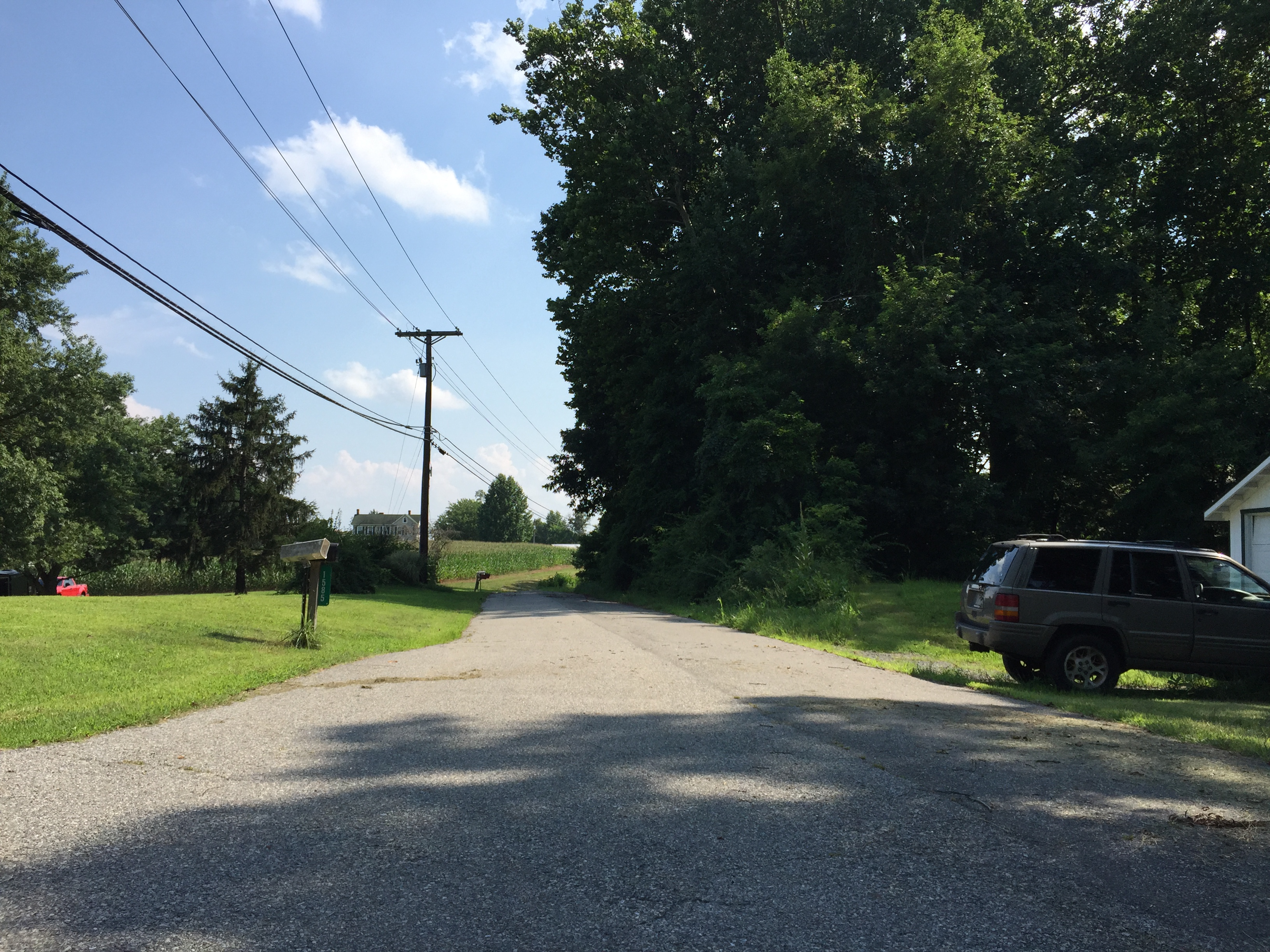
- Intersection of Plum Point & Old Plum Point roads

- Location within Maryland
- Coordinates: 38°36′10″N 76°34′13″W
- Country: United States
- State: Maryland
- County: Calvert
- Elevation: 135 ft (41 m)
- Time zone: UTC-5 (Eastern (EST))
  - Summer (DST): UTC-4 (EDT)
- ZIP code: 20639
- Area codes: 410, 443, and 667
- GNIS feature ID: 590980

Parran is an unincorporated community located at the crossroads of MD 263, Cox Road, and Emmanuel Church Road in Calvert County, Maryland, United States. Cornehill was listed on the National Register of Historic Places in 1973.
