= Maryland Route 765 =

State highway in Maryland, United States

Maryland Route 765
- Sections of MD 765 highlighted in red, from south to north: MD 765Q, MD 765, and MD 765A

Route information
- Maintained by MDSHA
- Existed: 1956–present

Location
- Country: United States
- State: Maryland
- Counties: Calvert

Highway system
- Maryland highway system; Interstate; US; State; Scenic Byways
← MD 764	→ MD 768

Maryland Route 765 (MD 765) is a collection of state highways in the U.S. state of Maryland. These 26 highways are service roads constructed or old alignments maintained to provide access to private property or county highways whose access was compromised by the realignment of MD 2 and MD 4 in Calvert County. There are six signed mainline segments of MD 765 comprising the old alignment of the concurrency of MD 2 and MD 4 (hereafter referenced as MD 2-4) through Solomons, Lusby, St. Leonard, and Port Republic, and the county seat of Prince Frederick in southern Calvert County. There are also 20 unsigned sections of MD 765 south of Prince Frederick and along MD 2 between its junction with MD 4 in Sunderland and Owings in northern Calvert County.

The portions of MD 765 that form the old alignment of Solomons Island Road were part of the original state road constructed as in the early 1910s, which ran the length of Calvert County from Solomons to Owings and continued north toward Annapolis. The highway was designated MD 2 in the late 1920s and extensively improved in the late 1930s and 1940s. The first portion of MD 765 was designated in the early 1950s when MD 2's bypass of Prince Frederick opened. Further sections of MD 765 were assigned between Sunderland and Owings when MD 2 was reconstructed north of MD 4 in the mid-1960s. All but one of the remaining portions of MD 765 were assigned following the relocation of MD 2-4 through Port Republic and St. Leonard in the early 1980s and through Lusby to Solomons in the late 1980s.

== Route description ==
There are six mainline sections of MD 765:

- MD 765R runs 1.27 miles (2.04 km) from MD 2 north to Dowell Road and MD 765Q within Solomons.
- MD 765Q has a length of 5.91 miles (9.51 km) from Dowell Road and MD 765R in Solomons north to MD 2-4 near Lusby.
- MD 765P extends 0.84 miles (1.35 km) from MD 2-4 near Lusby north to an entrance to Calvert Cliffs Nuclear Power Plant.
- MD 765N runs 0.89 miles (1.43 km) between a pair of intersections with MD 2-4 near St. Leonard.
- MD 765 (without suffix) has a length of 5.89 miles (9.48 km) from MD 2-4 in St. Leonard north to MD 2-4 near Port Republic.
- MD 765A extends 2.15 miles (3.46 km) from MD 2-4 near Prince Frederick to MD 2-4 in Prince Frederick.

=== Solomons–Lusby ===
Maryland Route 765R
- Location: Solomons
- Length: 1.27 mi (2.04 km)

Maryland Route 765Q
- Location: Solomons–Lusby
- Length: 5.91 mi (9.51 km)

MD 765R, which is known as Solomons Island Road South, begins at the ramp that MD 2 follows to join MD 4 northbound. MD 2 continues south a short distance to its terminus at Lore Road in Solomons. MD 765R passes a ramp from southbound MD 2-4 to MD 765R and passes by several shopping centers. Shortly before reaching its northern terminus, the state highway intersects Patuxent Point Parkway, which provides the only full service connection between the divided highway and the service road. MD 765R and MD 765Q have their northern and southern termini, respectively, at Dowell Road. Dowell Road heads east as a county highway and west as unsigned MD 2V, which provides access to the northbound direction of MD 2-4.

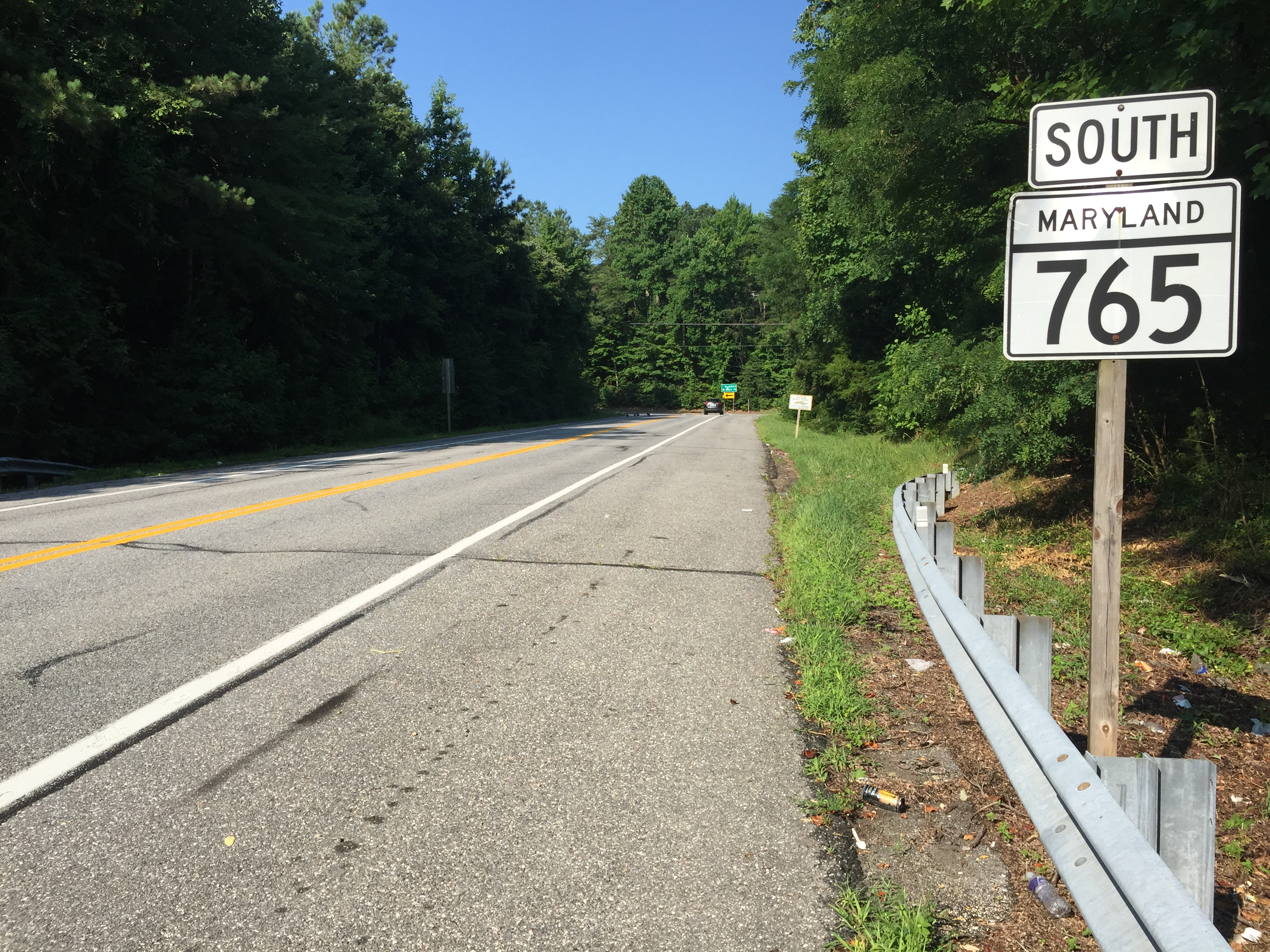
View south from the north end of MD 765Q at MD 2/MD 4 near Lusby

MD 765Q heads north as two-lane undivided H.G. Trueman Road from Dowell Road and veers away from the divided highway, which it continues to parallel from a distance. After meeting Southern Connector Boulevard, which heads west as unsigned MD 765Z, at a roundabout, the highway curves northeast to intersect MD 760 (Rousby Hall Road) and pass through the village center of Lusby. MD 765Q then curves north and then northwest, intersecting MD 497 (Cove Point Road). A park and ride lot is located on the southwest corner of this intersection. Following this, the road passes Middleham Chapel and the entrance to Calvert Cliffs State Park. The state highway intersects MD 2-4; its name changes to Pardoe Road on the west side of the divided highway. MD 765Q continues north a short distance on the west side of the divided highway, passing Sollers Wharf Road before turning east to its northern terminus at another intersection with MD 2-4 south of Johns Creek, a tributary of St. Leonard Creek.

=== Lusby–St. Leonard ===
There are two short mainline segments of MD 765 between Lusby and St. Leonard. MD 765P begins at MD 2-4 on the opposite side of Johns Creek from MD 765Q. The highway heads north as two-lane undivided Nursery Road parallel to the northbound side of the divided highway. MD 765P reaches its northern terminus when Nursery Road turns east to a barricade at a secondary entrance to Calvert Cliffs Nuclear Power Plant. MD 765N begins a short distance north of MD 765P's northern end at a right-in/right-out intersection with southbound MD 2-4 opposite the divided highway's directional crossover intersection with Calvert Cliffs Parkway, which is the main entrance to the nuclear power station. MD 765N heads north as Saw Mill Road along the southbound side of MD 2-4 to a full service intersection with the divided highway opposite MD 765M (Flag Ponds Parkway) just south of MD 2-4's bridge over Quaker Swamp, a branch of St. Leonard Creek.

=== St. Leonard–Port Republic ===
Maryland Route 765
- Location: St. Leonard–Port Republic
- Length: 5.07 mi (8.16 km)

MD 765, which is known as St. Leonard Road, begins at a full service intersection with MD 2-4 south of St. Leonard. The state highway heads north as a two-lane undivided road and meets Calvert Beach Road at a roundabout in the center of St. Leonard. Calvert Beach Road, which is unsigned MD 765J, heads east to the Chesapeake Bay communities of Calvert Beach and Long Beach. Between St. Leonard and Port Republic, MD 765 intersects Western Shores Boulevard, which leads east to another beach community and west as unsigned MD 2J to MD 2-4. In Port Republic, the state highway intersects MD 509 (Governor Run Road), which heads east to Kenwood Beach, and unnamed MD 765B, which is signed as a westward extension of MD 509 to MD 2-4. MD 765 veers west and intersects Parkers Creek Road, which is unsigned MD 765O. Parkers Creek Road heads south to a full service intersection with MD 2-4 and north toward Scientists Cliffs. MD 765 reaches its northern terminus at a right-in/right-out intersection with northbound MD 2-4 opposite the divided highway's directional crossover intersection with MD 264.

=== Prince Frederick ===
Maryland Route 765A
- Location: Prince Frederick
- Length: 2.15 mi (3.46 km)

MD 765A, which is known as Main Street, begins at an intersection with MD 2-4 south of Prince Frederick. The state highway heads north as a two-lane undivided road through a forested area before reaching the center of the county seat, where the highway passes the county courthouse and several county government office buildings. MD 765 meets the eastern terminus of MD 231 (Church Street) and passes Armory Street, the original alignment of MD 2 that splits northeast toward the county fairgrounds, before reaching its northern terminus at a tangent intersection with MD 2-4.

== History ==
Solomons Island Road was one of the original state roads marked for improvement to form a statewide system by the Maryland State Roads Commission in 1909. The highway was graded and surfaced as an improved dirt road from Owings south to Hunting Creek in 1910 and 1911 and from there to Prince Frederick between 1911 and 1913. Solomons Island Road from Prince Frederick south to Solomons was graded and surfaced as a dirt road in 1913 except for two segments: a 14-foot (4.3 m) wide shell road was built through Solomons and a 14-foot (4.3 m) wide gravel road was built for 3.6 miles (5.8 km) through Lusby. This highway was improved to a gravel road for its whole length and several dangerous curves were modified by 1919. When the roads commission assigned numbers to state highways in 1927, Solomons Island Road was designated MD 2. By 1934, the Maryland State Roads Commission proposed Solomons Island Road be widened from 16 to 18 feet (4.9 to 5.5 m) to 20 feet (6.1 m) from Owings to MD 509.

The first upgrades to MD 2 between Solomons and Prince Frederick occurred in 1937, when the highway was widened and resurfaced with bituminous stabilized gravel from Prince Frederick south to Port Republic. The highway was upgraded from Port Republic south through St. Leonard to beyond Quaker Swamp, with several relocations including a relocation at that creek, in 1939 and 1940. The MD 2 reconstruction continued south a few miles to the northern end of Lusby in 1942, a stretch widened to 22 feet (6.7 m) and resurfaced with bituminous stabilized gravel. The highway through Lusby was relocated, reconstructed, and surfaced with bituminous stabilized gravel in 1944. The gravel portions of MD 2 from Port Republic to Lusby were bituminous stabilized in 1946. The reconstruction of MD 2 from Prince Frederick to Solomons concluded in 1949 when the highway from Solomons north to the southern end of Lusby was relocated, resurfaced, and surfaced with bituminous stabilized gravel.

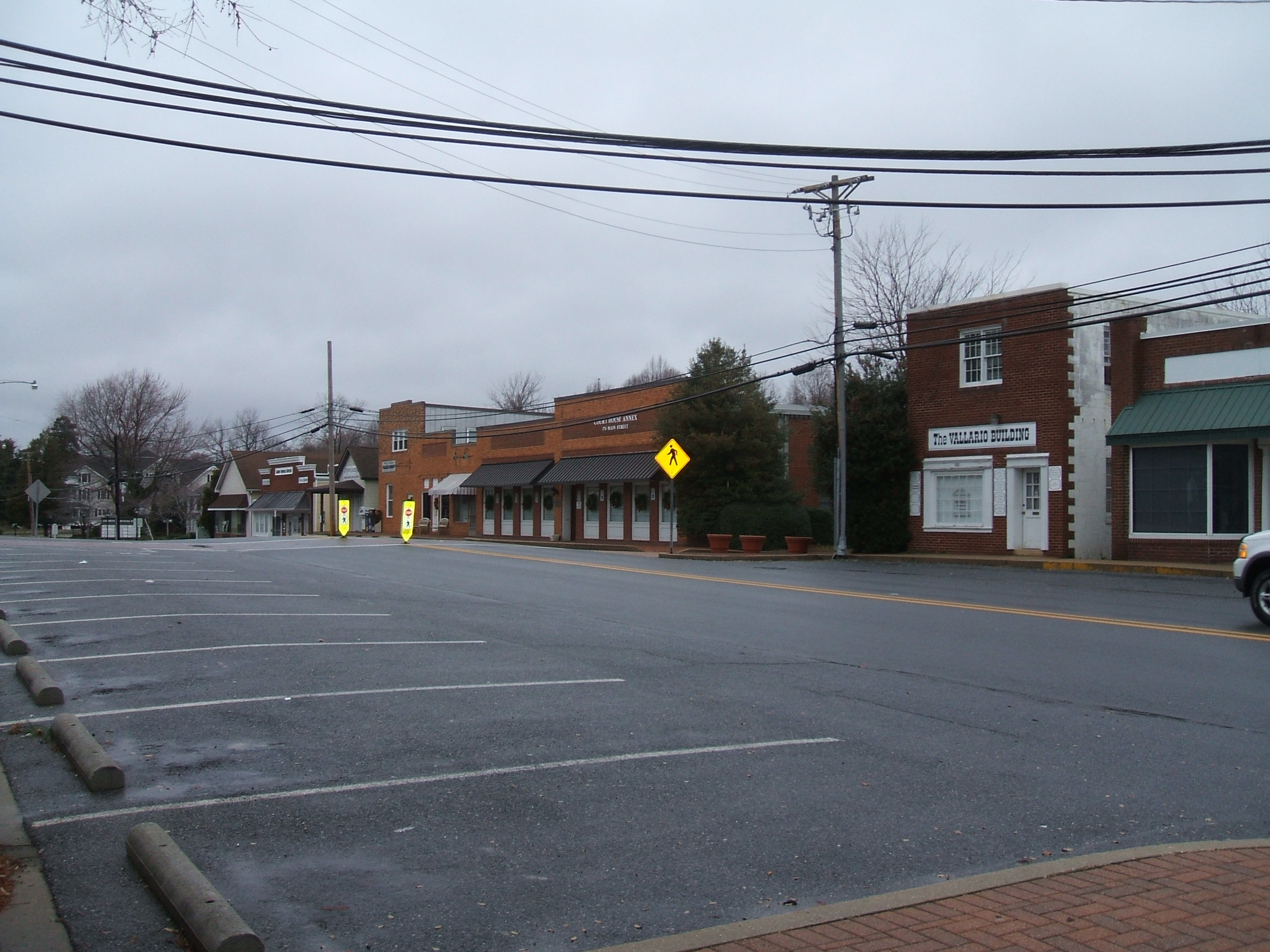
MD 765 northbound on Main Street in Prince Frederick

MD 2 originally followed Armory Road through the northern part of Prince Frederick. By 1946, the highway had been relocated to its modern alignment and paved north of Armory Road. The bypassed portion of Armory Road was marked as MD 750 by 1950 but may have been removed from the state highway system by 1952. MD 2 was widened to 27 feet (8.2 m) and resurfaced with bituminous concrete through Prince Frederick in 1950. This improvement occurred contemporaneously with or shortly before the construction of the Prince Frederick bypass; MD 2 moved to the new 24-foot (7.3 m) wide bituminous stabilized gravel highway in the autumn of 1951. The bypass was resurfaced with bituminous concrete in 1954 and 1955. By 1956, the old road through the county seat was marked as the first section of MD 765.

The next sections of MD 765 to be designated were between Sunderland and Owings when MD 2 was relocated north of MD 4 in 1965. Unsuffixed MD 765 was assigned to the old road through Port Republic and St. Leonard after MD 2-4 was relocated to its present course to the west of those communities in 1981. The four mainline portions of MD 765 through the Lusby and Solomons areas were designated when MD 2-4 was relocated through those communities in 1987. MD 765R and MD 765Q did not originally connect; the highways were connected when a new road was built between them parallel to MD 2-4 in 1999.

== Junction lists ==
All sections of MD 765 are entirely within Calvert County.

=== MD 765R and MD 765Q ===
Location	mi	km	Destinations	Notes
Solomons	0.00	0.00	MD 2 (Solomons Island Road) to MD 4 north – Prince Frederick	Southern terminus of MD 765R; roadway continues south as MD 2
Solomons	0.96	1.54	Patuxent Point Parkway to MD 2 (Solomons Island Road) / MD 4 – Prince Frederick, Leonardtown	
Solomons	1.27 0.00	2.04 0.00	Dowell Road to MD 2 north / MD 4 north (Solomons Island Road) – Prince Frederick	Dowell Road west is unsigned MD 2V; northern terminus of MD 765R; southern terminus of MD 765Q
Lusby	1.08	1.74	Southern Connector Boulevard – Drum Point	Roundabout; westbound Southern Connector Boulevard is unsigned MD 765Z
Lusby	1.84	2.96	MD 760 (Rousby Hall Road) – Drum Point	
Lusby	3.23	5.20	MD 497 (Cove Point Road) – Chesapeake Ranch Estates	
Lusby	5.25	8.45	MD 2 / MD 4 (Solomons Island Road) – Prince Frederick, Solomons	
Lusby	5.91	9.51	MD 2 / MD 4 (Solomons Island Road) – Prince Frederick, Solomons	Northern terminus of MD 765Q
1.000 mi = 1.609 km; 1.000 km = 0.621 mi

=== MD 765P ===
The entire route is in Lusby.

mi	km	Destinations	Notes
0.00	0.00	MD 2 / MD 4 (Solomons Island Road) – Prince Frederick, Solomons	Southern terminus of MD 765P
0.84	1.35	Nursery Road east	Northern terminus of MD 765P
1.000 mi = 1.609 km; 1.000 km = 0.621 mi

=== MD 765N ===
The entire route is in St. Leonard.

mi	km	Destinations	Notes
0.00	0.00	MD 2 south / MD 4 south (Solomons Island Road) – Solomons	Right-in/right-out intersection with southbound MD 2-4; southern terminus of MD 765N
0.89	1.43	MD 2 / MD 4 (Solomons Island Road) / Flag Ponds Parkway – Prince Frederick, Solomons	Northern terminus of MD 765N; Flag Ponds Parkway is unsigned MD 765M
1.000 mi = 1.609 km; 1.000 km = 0.621 mi

=== MD 765 ===
Location	mi	km	Destinations	Notes
St. Leonard	0.00	0.00	MD 2 / MD 4 (Solomons Island Road) – Prince Frederick, Solomons	Southern terminus of MD 765
St. Leonard	2.12	3.41	Calvert Beach Road – Calvert Beach	Roundabout; unsigned MD 765J
St. Leonard	3.49	5.62	Western Shores Boulevard	Westbound Western Shores Boulevard is unsigned MD 2J
Port Republic	4.10	6.60	MD 509 east (Governor Run Road)	
Port Republic	4.16	6.69	MD 509 west to MD 2 / MD 4	Officially MD 765B but signed as MD 509
Port Republic	4.60	7.40	Parkers Creek Road to MD 2 / MD 4 – Scientists Cliffs	Unsigned MD 765O
Port Republic	5.07	8.16	MD 2 north / MD 4 north (Solomons Island Road) – Prince Frederick	Northern terminus of MD 765; right-in/right-out intersection with northbound MD 2-4
1.000 mi = 1.609 km; 1.000 km = 0.621 mi

=== MD 765A ===
The entire route is in Prince Frederick.

mi	km	Destinations	Notes
0.00	0.00	MD 2 / MD 4 (Solomons Island Road) – Sunderland, Solomons	Southern terminus of MD 765A
1.78	2.86	MD 231 west (Church Street) – Hughesville	
2.15	3.46	MD 2 / MD 4 (Solomons Island Road) – Sunderland, Solomons	Northern terminus of MD 765A
1.000 mi = 1.609 km; 1.000 km = 0.621 mi

== Auxiliary routes ==
There are 20 other sections of MD 765 that comprise very short sections of the old alignment of MD 2 or form service roads or connectors from or between MD 2 and MD 765. MD 765W, MD 765X, and MD 765Y are located in Solomons. MD 765Z is located in Lusby. MD 765K, MD 765M, MD 765T, MD 765U, and MD 765V are found between Lusby and St. Leonard. MD 765B, MD 765C, MD 765J, MD 765O, and MD 765S are found in St. Leonard and Port Republic. MD 765D, MD 765E, MD 765F, MD 765G, MD 765H, and MD 765I were designated along MD 2 between Sunderland and Owings.

- MD 765B is the designation for an unnamed 0.13-mile (0.21 km) connector between MD 2-4 and MD 765 in Port Republic. This connector is signed as a western segment of MD 509.
- MD 765C is the designation for Hurry Lane, a 0.05-mile (0.080 km) service road that heads east from Parkers Creek Road to a dead end in Port Republic.
- MD 765D is the designation for Wayside Drive, a 0.90-mile (1.45 km) section of old alignment of MD 2 that parallels the southbound side of the present highway north of Sunderland.
- MD 765E is the designation for Kent Road, a 0.15-mile (0.24 km) section of old alignment of MD 2 that parallels the southern side of the present highway from its southern end at MD 2 to a dead end in Sunderland.
- MD 765F is the designation for an unnamed 0.02-mile (0.032 km) service road that heads east toward a dead end from MD 2 opposite C Jones Road in Sunderland.
- MD 765G is the designation for an unnamed 0.18-mile (0.29 km) section of old alignment of MD 2 that parallels the southbound side of the present highway between MD 2 and MD 262 adjacent to All Saints' Church in Sunderland.
- MD 765H is the designation for an unnamed 0.28-mile (0.45 km) section of old alignment of MD 2 that parallels the northbound side of the present highway between MD 2 and MD 778 just south of Owings.
- MD 765I is the designation for Mt. Harmony Lane, a 0.87-mile (1.40 km) section of old alignment of MD 2 that parallels the northbound side of the present highway on both sides of Mt. Harmony Road, which is the old alignment of MD 260.
- MD 765J is the designation for a 0.48-mile (0.77 km) section of Calvert Beach Road from MD 2-4 to a point east of MD 765 in St. Leonard, where Calvert Beach Road continues east as a county highway toward Calvert Beach and Long Beach. MD 765J intersects MD 765 at a roundabout.
- MD 765K is the designation for a 0.24-mile (0.39 km) section of Flag Ponds Parkway, which consists of a service road paralleling the northbound direction of MD 2-4 south of St. Leonard. Flag Ponds Parkway continues east as a county highway toward Flag Ponds Nature Park.
- MD 765M is the designation for a 0.03-mile (0.048 km) connector between MD 2-4 and MD 765K opposite the northern terminus of MD 765N south of St. Leonard.
- MD 765O is the designation for a 0.14-mile (0.23 km) section of Parkers Creek Road between MD 2-4 and MD 765 in Port Republic. Parkers Creek Road continues north from MD 765 as a county highway toward Scientists Cliffs.
- MD 765S is the designation for a 0.09-mile (0.14 km) section of Ball Road immediately to the west of its intersection with MD 2-4 opposite MD 765J in St. Leonard. Ball Road continues west as a county highway.
- MD 765T is the designation for Woodland Court, a 0.18-mile (0.29 km) section of old alignment of MD 2-4 between MD 765N and a dead end south of St. Leonard.
- MD 765U is the unnamed designation for a 0.11-mile (0.18 km) section of old alignment of MD 2-4 between MD 765N and a dead end north of Lusby.
- MD 765V is the designation for Nursery Court, a 0.07-mile (0.11 km) section of old alignment of MD 2-4 between MD 765P and a dead end in Lusby.
- MD 765W is the unnamed designation for a 0.20-mile (0.32 km) section of old alignment of MD 2-4 between MD 765Q just south of its northern terminus and a dead end in Lusby.
- MD 765X is the designation for Creston Lane, a 0.24-mile (0.39 km) service road between MD 765Y and a park and ride near Solomons.
- MD 765Y is the designation for portions of Patuxent Point Parkway and Swaggers Point Road, a 0.12-mile (0.19 km) service road that heads west from MD 2-4 near Solomons. Patuxent Point Parkway and Swaggers Point Road continue west as county roads from their state-maintained portions. A county-maintained section of Patuxent Point Parkway also heads east from MD 2-4 and intersects MD 765R.
- MD 765Z is the designation for a 0.20-mile (0.32 km) section of Southern Connector Boulevard from MD 2-4 to a roundabout with MD 765Q in Lusby. MD 765Z was constructed and designated in 2008 with the rest of Southern Connector Boulevard.
