= Maryland Route 497 =

State highway in Maryland, United States

Maryland Route 497
- Cove Point Road
- Maryland Route 497 highlighted in red

Route information
- Maintained by MDSHA
- Length: 2.68 mi (4.31 km)
- Existed: 1933–present

Major junctions
- West end: MD 2 / MD 4 in Lusby
- MD 765 in Lusby
- East end: Lighthouse Boulevard in Cove Point

Location
- Country: United States
- State: Maryland
- Counties: Calvert

Highway system
- Maryland highway system; Interstate; US; State; Scenic Byways
← MD 496	→ MD 500

Maryland Route 497 (MD 497) is a state highway in the U.S. state of Maryland. Known as Cove Point Road, the state highway runs 2.68 miles (4.31 km) from MD 2/MD 4 in Lusby east to the community of Cove Point. MD 497 was constructed in the early 1930s.

== Route description ==
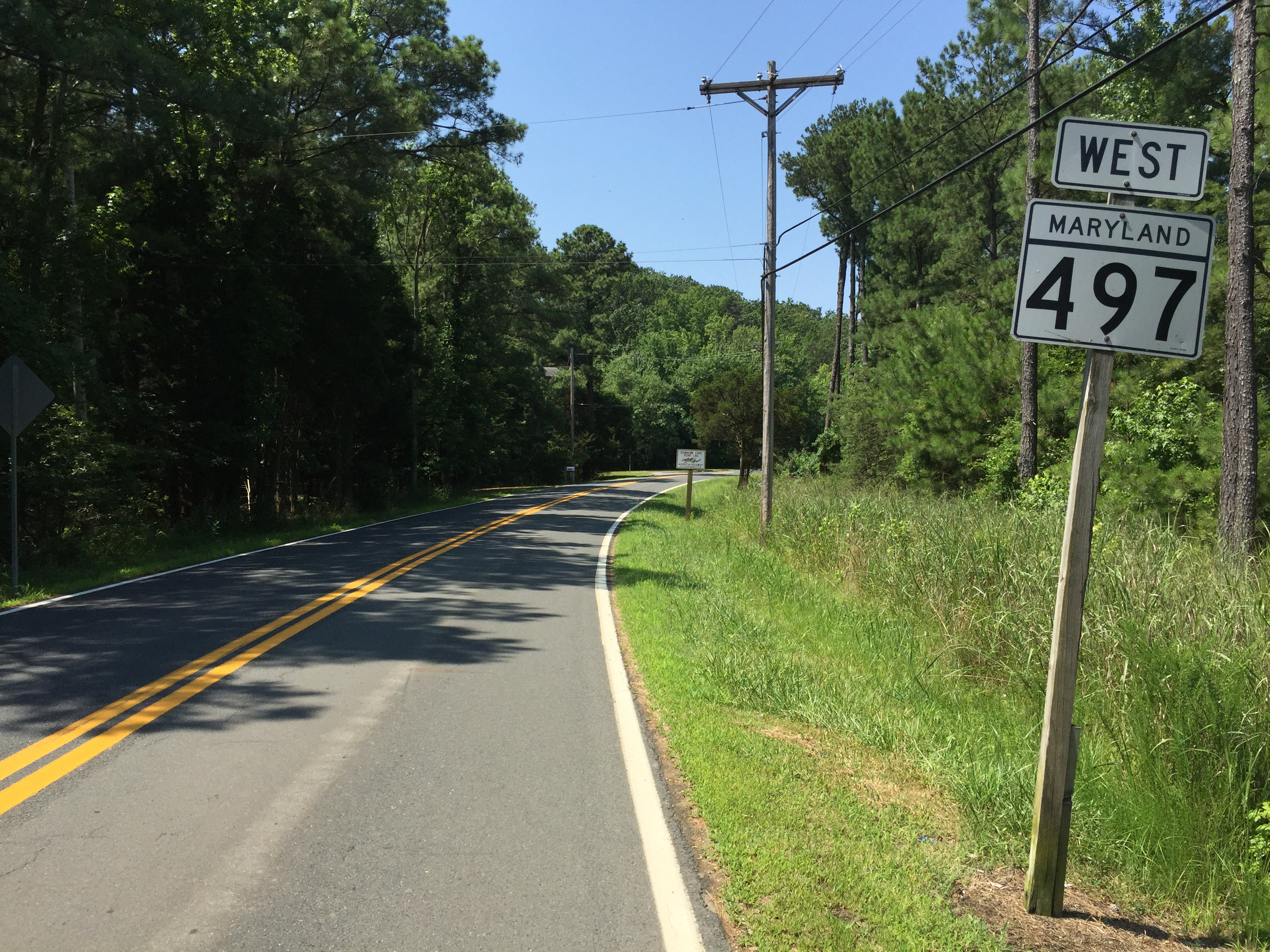
View west from the east end of MD 497 in Cove Point

MD 497 begins at an intersection with MD 2/MD 4, which run concurrently as Solomons Island Road, in Lusby. The state highway heads east as a two-lane undivided road and intersects the old alignment of MD 2, MD 765 (H.G. Trueman Road). A park and ride lot is located on the southwest corner of this intersection. MD 497 continues east along Cove Point Park before intersecting Little Cove Point Road, which leads to the Chesapeake Ranch Estates community and the Chesapeake Ranch Airstrip. The state highway passes by the entrance to the Cove Point Liquefied Natural Gas Terminal and through a forested area before reaching its eastern terminus at the entrance to the Cove Point community. The roadway continues as county-maintained Lighthouse Boulevard to the Cove Point Light.

== History ==
MD 497 was constructed as a gravel road from MD 2 (now MD 765) to its eastern terminus by 1933. The state highway was extended west to MD 2/MD 4 when the two highways were relocated from MD 765 to a new divided highway to the west around 1987.

== Junction list ==
The entire route is in Calvert County.

Location	mi	km	Destinations	Notes
Lusby	0.00	0.00	MD 2 / MD 4 (Solomons Island Road) – Prince Frederick, Solomons	Western terminus
Lusby	0.25	0.40	MD 765 (H.G. Trueman Road)	Officially MD 765Q
Cove Point	2.68	4.31	Lighthouse Boulevard east – Cove Point Light	Eastern terminus
1.000 mi = 1.609 km; 1.000 km = 0.621 mi
