= Maryland Route 760 =

State highway in Maryland, United States

Maryland Route 760
- Rousby Hall Road

Route information
- Maintained by MDSHA
- Length: 4.56 mi (7.34 km)
- Existed: 1962–present

Major junctions
- South end: Rousby Road in Drum Point
- MD 765 in Lusby
- North end: MD 2 / MD 4 in Lusby

Location
- Country: United States
- State: Maryland
- Counties: Calvert

Highway system
- Maryland highway system; Interstate; US; State; Scenic Byways
← MD 759	→ MD 761

Maryland Route 760 (MD 760) is a state highway in the U.S. state of Maryland. Known as Rousby Hall Road, the state highway runs 4.56 miles (7.34 km) from Rousby Road in Drum Point north to MD 2/MD 4 in Lusby. The portion of MD 760 in Lusby was built as MD 503 in the early 1930s; the Drum Point section was constructed as a county highway by 1939. MD 503 was removed from the state highway system in the late 1950s. MD 760 was designated in two sections in the early 1960s.

== Route description ==
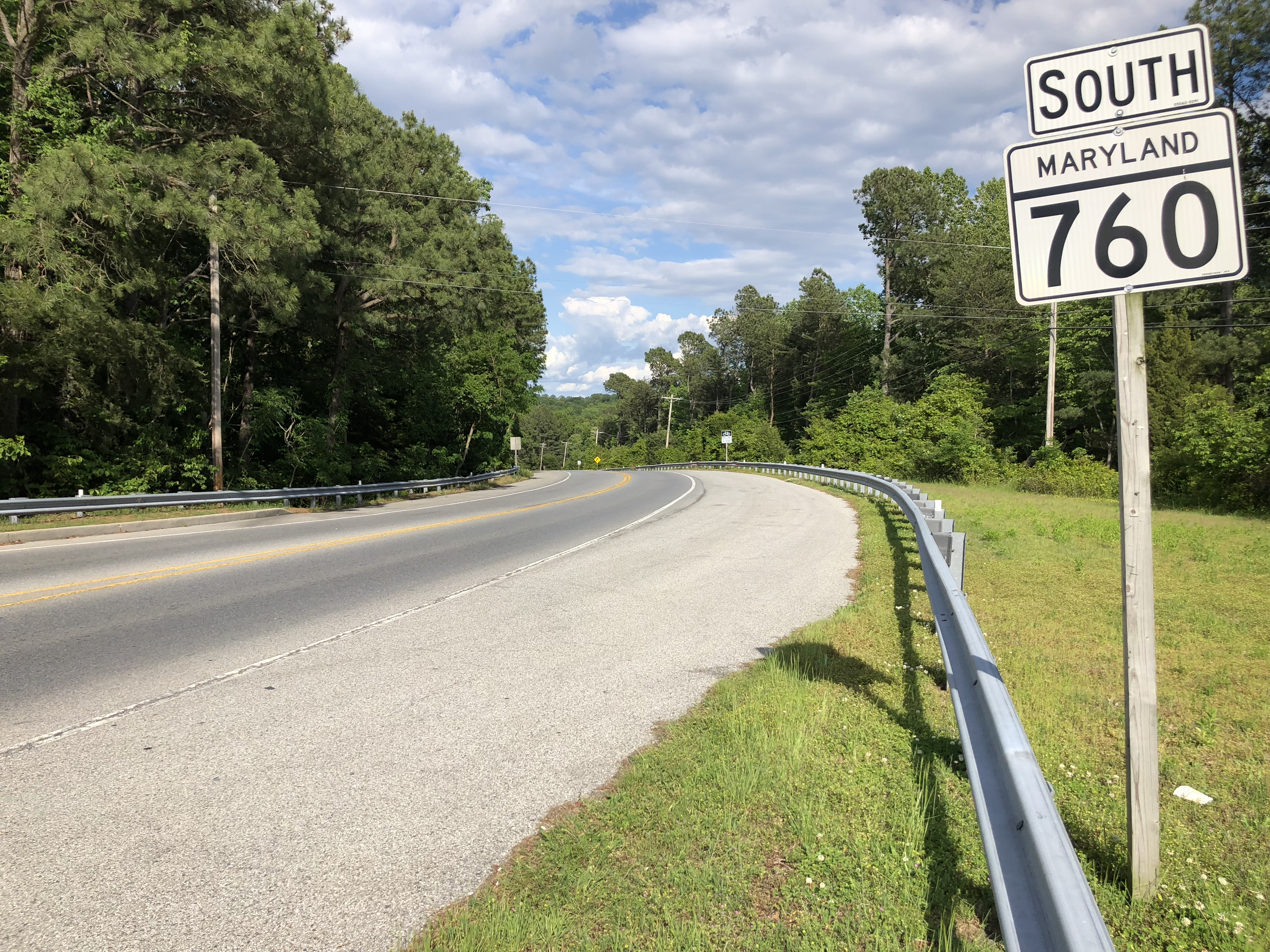
View south along MD 760 at Olivet Road and Southern Connector Boulevard in Lusby

MD 760 begins at Rousby Road on a peninsula adjacent to Solomons Island and the mouth of the Patuxent River. The state highway heads east and then northeast as a two-lane undivided road through the community of Drum Point. MD 760 curves north as it passes along the western edge of Chesapeake Ranch Estates and crosses Coles Creek. The state highway turns west and crosses Mill Creek into Lusby, where the highway meets Olivet Road and Southern Connector Boulevard at a roundabout, from which MD 760 continues north. MD 760 intersects MD 765 (H.G. Trueman Road) in a commercial area before reaching its northern terminus at a directional crossover intersection with MD 2/MD 4, which run concurrently as Solomons Island Road.

== History ==
MD 760's predecessor state highway was MD 503, which was assigned to the highway from MD 2 (now MD 765) in Lusby to the southern end of Olivet Road in community of Olivet on the peninsula between St. John Creek and Mill Creek. The portion of MD 760 in Drum Point was preceded by a series of streets, now part of residential subdivisions, that connected Lusby with the Drum Point Light. MD 503 was constructed as a gravel road in 1933. The Drum Point portion of MD 760 was constructed as a county highway by 1938 to provide access to the M.M. Davis Shipyard, a leading producer of yachts that was sited on Ship Point opposite Solomons at the mouth of Mill Creek in 1913. The road to the Davis Shipyard and the portion of MD 503 north to MD 2 was improved as a wartime access project in around 1944. MD 503 was removed from the state highway system in 1957. MD 760 was assigned in two sections: along Rousby Hall Road from the present southern terminus to Olivet Road in 1962, and from there north to MD 2 in 1963. The state highway was extended north to MD 2/MD 4 when the two highways were relocated from MD 765 to a new divided highway to the west around 1987; this intersection was changed to a directional crossover intersection in 2005. The roundabout at Olivet Road was constructed in 2006 in conjunction with the fourth leg of the roundabout, Southern Connector Boulevard.

== Junction list ==
The entire route is in Calvert County.

Location	mi	km	Destinations	Notes
Drum Point	0.00	0.00	Rousby Road west	Southern terminus
Lusby	3.17	5.10	Olivet Road south / Southern Connector Boulevard west	Roundabout
Lusby	4.38	7.05	MD 765 (H.G. Trueman Road)	Officially MD 765Q
Lusby	4.65	7.48	MD 2 / MD 4 (Solomons Island Road) – Solomons, Prince Frederick	Northern terminus
1.000 mi = 1.609 km; 1.000 km = 0.621 mi
