= Maryland Route 509 =

State highway in Maryland, United States

Maryland Route 509

Route information
- Maintained by MDSHA
- Length: 1.14 mi (1.83 km)
- Existed: 1933–present

Major junctions
- West end: MD 2 / MD 4 in Port Republic
- MD 765 in Port Republic
- East end: Dead end near Port Republic

Location
- Country: United States
- State: Maryland
- Counties: Calvert

Highway system
- Maryland highway system; Interstate; US; State; Scenic Byways
| ← MD 508 | → MD 513 |

Maryland Route 509 (MD 509) is a state highway in the U.S. state of Maryland. Known for most of its length as Governor Run Road, the state highway runs 1.14 miles (1.83 km) from MD 2/MD 4 east to a dead end at the Chesapeake Bay within Port Republic. MD 509 was constructed east from what is now MD 765 in the early 1930s. The highway was extended west to MD 2/MD 4 in the early 1980s.

== Route description ==
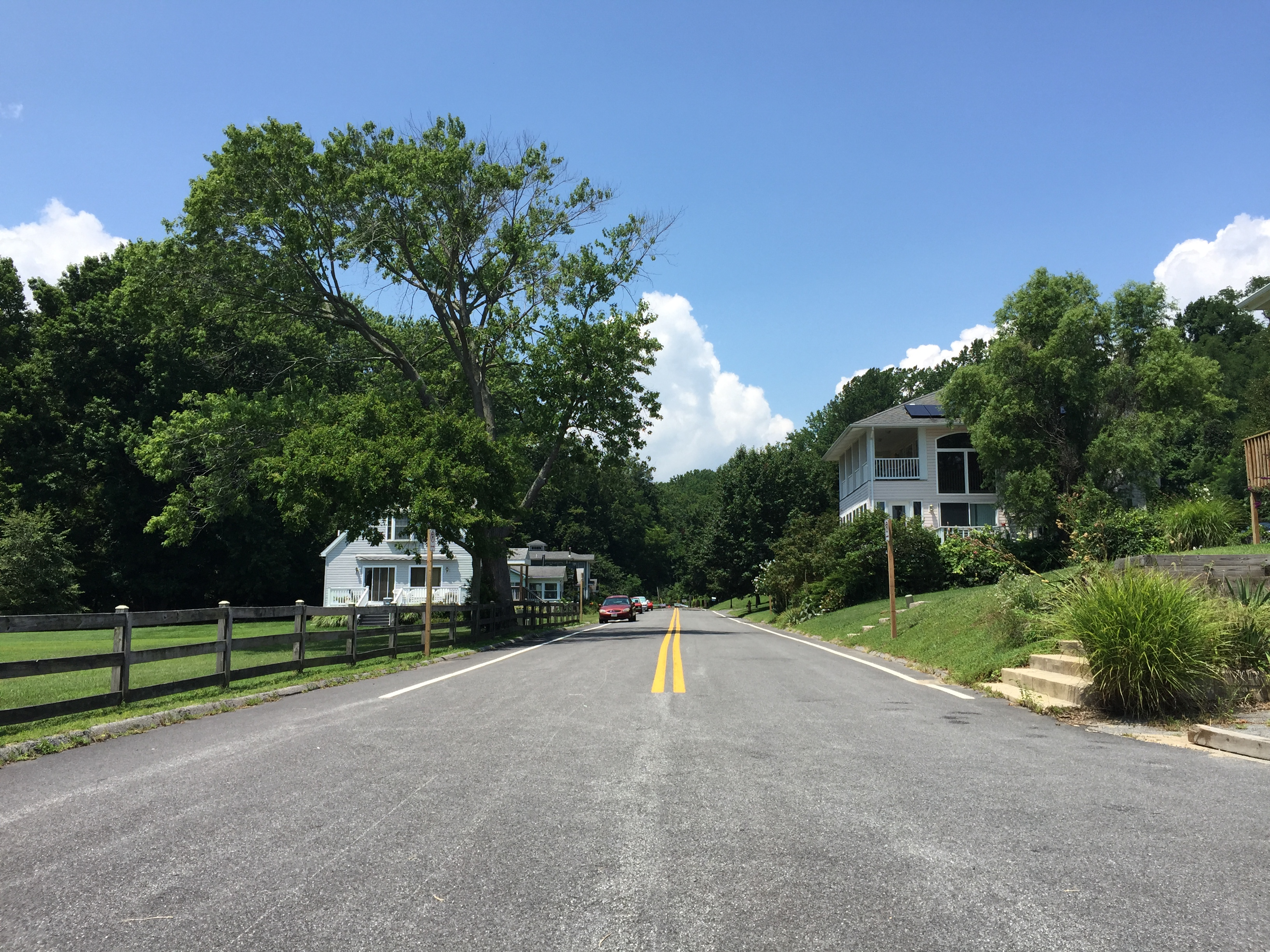
View west from the east end of MD 509 in Port Republic

MD 509 begins at an intersection with Solomons Island Road, a four-lane divided highway that carries the concurrency of MD 2/MD 4, in Port Republic. The state highway heads north along an unnamed two-lane undivided road to MD 765 (St. Leonard Road). The two state highways run concurrently southeast along St. Leonard Road for a short distance before MD 509 splits east onto Governor Run Road. The highway heads east as a two-lane undivided road through a forested area split by a trio of transmission lines that extend north from the Calvert Cliffs Nuclear Power Plant. Near its eastern terminus, MD 509 intersects Kenwood Beach Road, which serves the beach community of Kenwood Beach. After crossing Governor Run, the state highway reaches its eastern terminus at a dead end just west of the Chesapeake Bay shoreline.

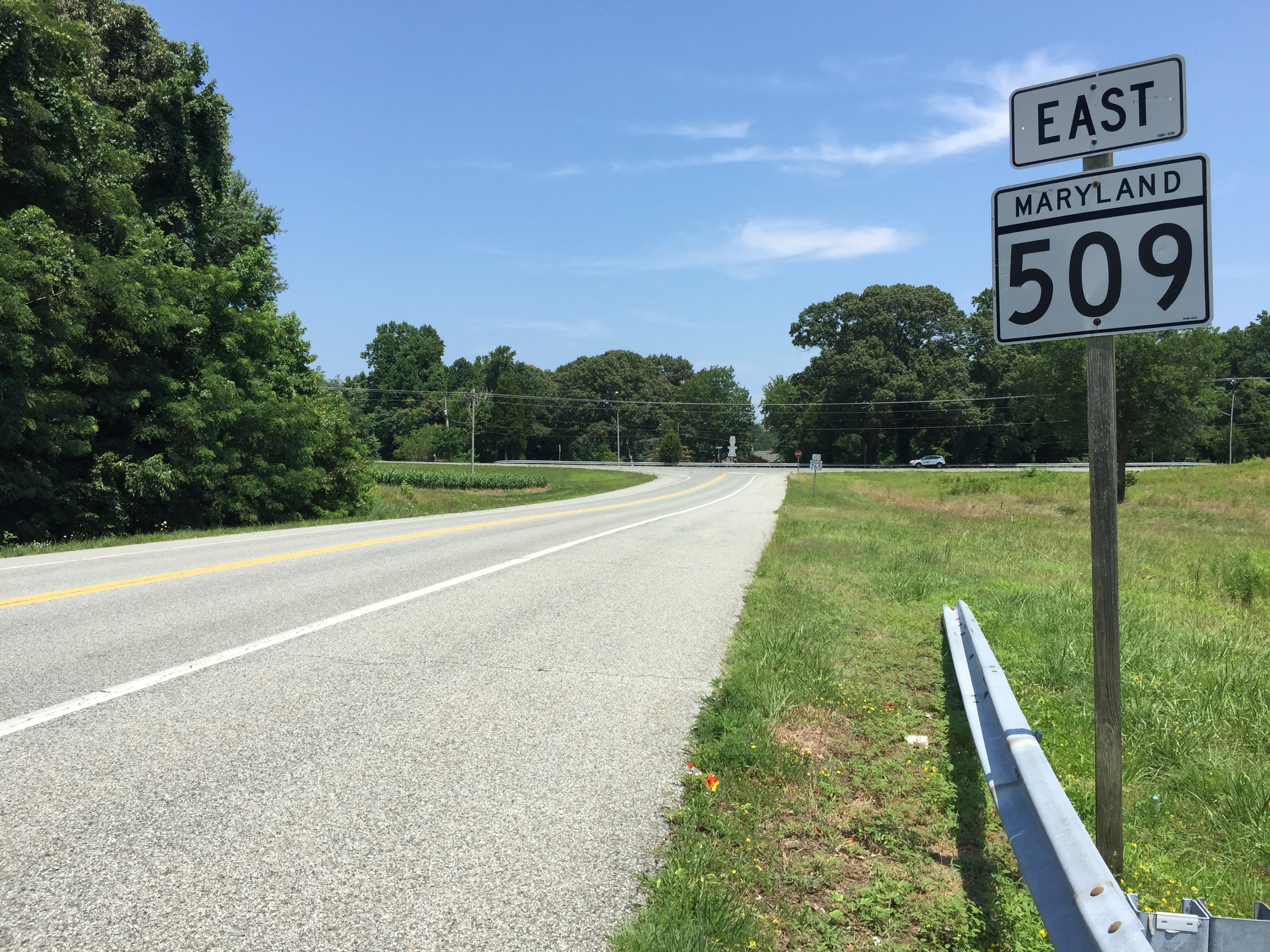
"Signed" section of MD 509 (officially MD 765B) east of MD 2/MD 4 in Port Republic

Though the portion of the highway between MD 2/MD 4 and the St. Leonard Road/Governor Run Road intersection is signed MD 509, it is officially designated MD 765B and MD 765 by the MDSHA.

== History ==
MD 509 was constructed east from MD 2 (now MD 765) to the bay by 1933. The MD 2/MD 4 divided highway was constructed around 1981; the western extension of MD 509 was built by 1985.

== Junction list ==
The entire route is in Port Republic, Calvert County.

| mi | km | Destinations | Notes |
|---|---|---|---|
| 0.00 | 0.00 | MD 2 / MD 4 (Solomons Island Road) – Prince Frederick, Solomons | Western terminus of signed MD 509 |
| 0.13 | 0.21 | MD 765 north (St. Leonard Road) | Western end of signed MD 765 concurrency |
| 0.19 | 0.31 | MD 765 south (St. Leonard Road) – St. Leonard | Eastern end of signed MD 765 concurrency; the officially designated portion of MD 509 begins here |
| 1.14 | 1.83 | Dead end at Chesapeake Bay | Eastern terminus |
1.000 mi = 1.609 km; 1.000 km = 0.621 mi: Concurrency terminus
