= Chesapeake Ranch Estates-Drum Point, Maryland =

- Former Census-designated place (CDP)
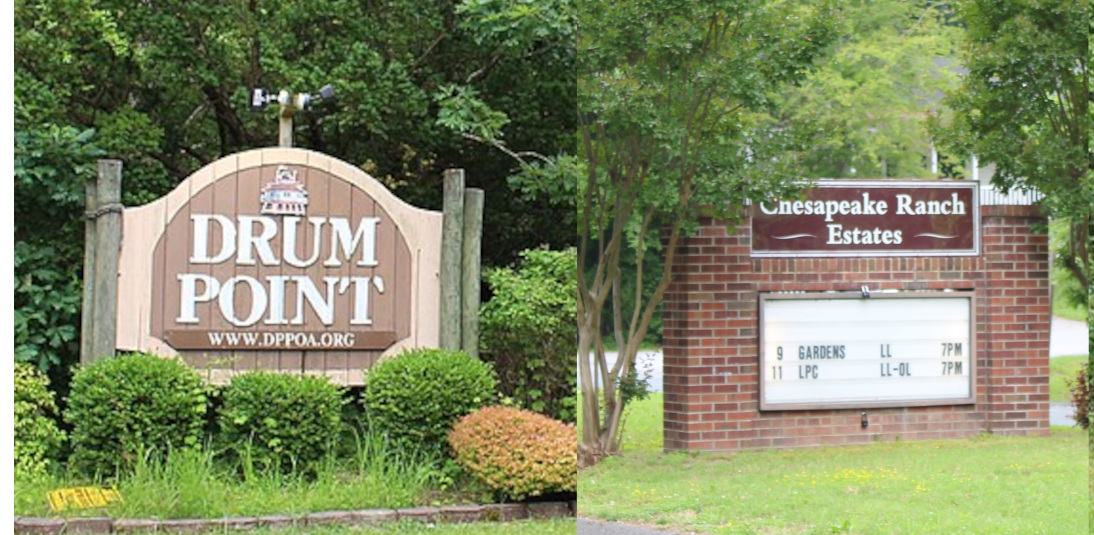

- Location of Chesapeake Ranch Estates-Drum Point, Maryland
- Coordinates: 38°21′0″N 76°25′8″W
- Country: United States
- State: Maryland
- County: Calvert

Area
  - Total: 6.4 sq mi (16.6 km^{2})
  - Land: 6.0 sq mi (15.6 km^{2})
  - Water: 0.35 sq mi (0.9 km^{2})

Population (2000)
  - Total: 11,503
  - Density: 1,905/sq mi (735.4/km^{2})
- Time zone: UTC−5 (Eastern (EST))
  - Summer (DST): UTC−4 (EDT)
- FIPS code: 24-16062

Chesapeake Ranch Estates-Drum Point was a census-designated place in Calvert County, Maryland, for the 2000 United States census, when it had a population of 11,503. For the 2010 census the area was split into the CDPs of Chesapeake Ranch Estates and Drum Point. The communities are only a few minutes from the popular weekend resort town Solomons as well as the Calvert Cliffs Nuclear Power Plant, Calvert Cliffs State Park and fossil grounds, and the Dominion Cove Point liquefied natural gas terminal.

== Geography ==
Chesapeake Ranch Estates-Drum Point is located at 38°21′0″N 76°25′8″W (38.350075, −76.418936).

According to the United States Census Bureau, the CDP had a total area of 6.4 square miles (17 km^{2}), of which, 6.0 square miles (16 km^{2}) of it is land and 0.4 square miles (1.0 km^{2}) of it (5.62%) is water.

== Demographics ==
As of the census of 2000, there were 11,503 people, 3,865 households, and 3,041 families residing in the CDP. The population density was 1,904.8 inhabitants per square mile (735.4/km^{2}). There were 4,281 housing units at an average density of 708.9 per square mile (273.7/km^{2}). The racial makeup of the CDP was 85.52% White, 10.52% African American, 0.36% Native American, 0.85% Asian, 0.05% Pacific Islander, 0.87% from other races, and 1.83% from two or more races. Hispanic or Latino of any race were 2.43% of the population.

There were 3,865 households, out of which 49.0% had children under the age of 18 living with them, 63.4% were married couples living together, 9.8% had a female householder with no husband present, and 21.3% were non-families. 15.9% of all households were made up of individuals, and 4.0% had someone living alone who was 65 years of age or older. The average household size was 2.98 and the average family size was 3.33.

In the CDP, the population was spread out, with 34.3% under the age of 18, 6.1% from 18 to 24, 36.8% from 25 to 44, 16.3% from 45 to 64, and 6.5% who were 65 years of age or older. The median age was 32 years. For every 100 females, there were 99.9 males. For every 100 females age 18 and over, there were 97.1 males.

The median income for a household in the CDP was $56,904, and the median income for a family was $60,011. Males had a median income of $44,545 versus $29,380 for females. The per capita income for the CDP was $21,428. About 4.3% of families and 4.8% of the population were below the poverty line, including 6.7% of those under age 18 and 3.7% of those age 65 or over.
