= Flag Pond =

Flag Pond may refer to the following places in the United States:

- Flag Pond, Tennessee, unincorporated community in Unicoi County
- Flag Pond Landing, Virginia, unincorporated community in Accomack County
- Flag Ponds Nature Park, a nature preserve located in St. Leonard, Maryland
