= Port Republic, Maryland =

Unincorporated community in Maryland, United States

- Unincorporated community
- Location within Maryland Location within the United States
- Coordinates: 38°30′03″N 76°31′46″W
- Country: United States
- State: Maryland
- County: Calvert
- Elevation: 154 ft (47 m)
- Time zone: UTC-5 (Eastern (EST))
  - Summer (DST): UTC-4 (EDT)
- ZIP code: 20676
- Area codes: 410, 443, and 667
- GNIS feature ID: 591051

Port Republic is a small, rural unincorporated community located at the crossroads of MD routes 2/MD 4, MD 264, MD 509, MD 765, and Parkers Creek Road in Calvert County, Maryland, United States. It is approximately five miles south of Prince Frederick, the county seat of Calvert County.

While Port Republic is not incorporated and has no central business district, it nonetheless features several places of note, including historic Christ Episcopal Church, listed on the National Register of Historic Places in 1973, and a restored one room school building. The annual Calvert County Jousting Tournament is held the last Saturday in August on the grounds of Christ Church, and was featured in a 2005 edition of ESPN's SportsCenter's "50 States in 50 Days" feature. The former College of Southern Maryland campus at Port Republic was relocated in 2005 to Prince Frederick.

Residential communities located in Port Republic include Governors' Run, Kenwood Beach, Scientists' Cliffs, and Western Shores. Port Republic has a post office with the designated ZIP code 20676.

== Notable Person ==
- Earl F. Hance – Secretary of the Maryland Department of Agriculture from 2009 to 2015; owns a 600-acre farm in Port Republic
