= Annie Gravatt =

American forest pathologist

- Born: 15 May 1894
- Died: 18 May 1986 (aged 92)
- Other names: Annie Evelyn Rathbun
- Education: A.B., Brown University 1916; M.S., 1918
- Spouse: George Gravatt
- Scientific career
- Fields: Plant pathology
- Institutions: USDA

Annie Gravatt (Annie Evelyn Rathbun) was an American forest pathologist. Her areas of research included plant physiology and white pine blister rust. She also studied Chestnut blight, the fungus that devastated American chestnut trees in the early 20th century. Along with her husband, George Gravatt, she founded the community of Scientists' Cliffs, Maryland.

== Education ==
Gravatt received her B.A. from Brown University in 1916, and her M.S. in 1918.

== Career ==
Gravatt spent her entire career with the United States Department of Agriculture, in the agency's Bureau of Plant Industry. She also served on the editorial staff of Phytopathology, the journal of the American Phytopathological Society. She was a member of the American Association for the Advancement of Science and the American Phytopathological Society.

== Publications ==
The following is an incomplete list of Gravatt's publications:

- 1918. The fungous flora of pine seed beds. Phytopathology 8: 469-483. [Gravatt], Annie Rathbun. 582
- 1921. Methods of direct inoculation with damping -off fungi. Phytopathology 11: 80-84. [Gravatt], Annie Rathbun. 583
- 1922. Root rot of pine seedlings. Phytopathology 12: 213-220, illus. [Gravatt], Annie Rathbun. 584
- 1923. Damping -off of taproots of conifers. Phytopathology 13: 385-391. Gravatt, Annie Rathbun. 585
- 1925. Direct inoculation of coniferous stems with damping- off fungi. Jour. Agr. Res. 30: 327-339, illus. Gravatt, Annie Rathbun. 586
- 1925. Conditions antecedent to the infection of white pines by Cronartium ribicola in the northeastern United States. Phytopathology, 15: 573-583. Spaulding, P. and Annie Rathbun-Gravatt.
- 1925. Longevity of the uredospores, teliospores, and sporidia of Cronartium ribicola (Abstract). Phytopathology, 15: 58.Spaulding, P. and Annie Rathbun-Gravatt.
- 1925. Inoculation of pinus strobus trees with sporidia of Cronartium ribicola. Phytopathology: 15: 584-590. Snell, Walter H., Gravatt, Annie.
- 1925. Longevity of the teliospores and accompanying uredospores of Cronartium ribicola. Fischer in 1923. Journal of Agriculture, Res. 31: 901-916. Spaulding, P. and Annie Rathbun-Gravatt.
- 1925. The influence of physical factors on the viability of sporidia of Cronartium ribicola. Fischer in 1923. Journal of Agriculture, Res. 33: 397-433. Spaulding, P. and Annie Rathbun-Gravatt.
- 1927. A witches' broom of introduced Japanese cherry trees. Phytopathology 17: 19-24, illus. Gravatt, Annie Rathbun. 587
- 1927. The results of inoculating Pinus strobus with the sporidia of Cronartium ribicola. Jour. Agr. Res. 34: 497-510. (Illustrated) York, HH. Walter H Snell. Annie Gravatt.
- 1931. Germination loss of coniferous seeds due to parasites. Jour. Agr. Res. 42: 71-92. Gravatt, Annie Rathbun, and others. 588
- 1937. Some effects of plant diseases on variability of yields. Phytopathology: 27: 159-171. Carl Hartley, Annie Gravatt.
- 1942. Systemic brooming, a virus disease of black locust. Jour. Forestry 40: 253-260, illus. Gravatt, Annie Rathbun. 581

== Scientists' Cliffs ==
Annie Gravatt and her husband George "Flippo" Gravatt founded the community of Scientists' Cliffs, Maryland in 1937. Annie and George were initially interested in the Calvert County site, overlooking the Chesapeake Bay, because they thought it had potential as a preserve for the American chestnut. Originally, the site was a cluster of rustic summer cabins, including the Gravatts', built from chestnut trees killed by the blight. Eventually, the community grew and attracted year-round residents, and today, has over 200 homes. Membership in the community is selective; prospective homeowners must hold an advanced degree or have "outstanding professional experience."

In the 1980s, the Gravatt's property was purchased by the American Chestnut Land Trust. A hiking trail, "Gravatt Lane," and nearby "Gravatt Stream," were named in honor of the Gravatts. The Gravatts' cabin is now a museum displaying fossils and marine life.
