= Calvert Beach-Long Beach, Maryland =

- Former Census-designated place (CDP)
- Location of CalvertBeach-Long Beach, Maryland
- Coordinates: 38°27′52″N 76°28′36″W
- Country: United States
- State: Maryland
- County: Calvert

Area
  - Total: 2.5 sq mi (6.6 km^{2})
  - Land: 2.5 sq mi (6.6 km^{2})
  - Water: 0 sq mi (0.0 km^{2})

Population (2000)
  - Total: 2,487
  - Density: 980/sq mi (378.4/km^{2})
- Time zone: UTC−5 (Eastern (EST))
  - Summer (DST): UTC−4 (EDT)
- FIPS code: 24-12305

Calvert Beach-Long Beach was a census-designated place (CDP) in Calvert County, Maryland, United States. The population was 2,487 at the 2000 census. For the 2010 census the area was split into two CDPs: Calvert Beach and Long Beach.

== Geography ==
Calvert Beach-Long Beach is located at 38°27′52″N 76°28′36″W (38.464582, −76.476533).

According to the United States Census Bureau, the CDP had a total area of 2.5 square miles (6.5 km^{2}), all of it land.

== Demographics ==
As of the census of 2000, there were 2,487 people, 864 households, and 672 families residing in the CDP. The population density was 980.2 inhabitants per square mile (378.5/km^{2}). There were 966 housing units at an average density of 380.7 per square mile (147.0/km^{2}). The racial makeup of the CDP was 90.39% White, 6.63% African American, 0.20% Native American, 0.68% Asian, 0.88% from other races, and 1.21% from two or more races. Hispanic or Latino of any race were 1.69% of the population.

There were 864 households, out of which 44.0% had children under the age of 18 living with them, 64.5% were married couples living together, 8.9% had a female householder with no husband present, and 22.2% were non-families. 17.0% of all households were made up of individuals, and 4.5% had someone living alone who was 65 years of age or older. The average household size was 2.87 and the average family size was 3.23.

In the CDP, the population was spread out, with 30.9% under the age of 18, 6.0% from 18 to 24, 35.2% from 25 to 44, 21.1% from 45 to 64, and 6.8% who were 65 years of age or older. The median age was 34 years. For every 100 females, there were 99.6 males. For every 100 females age 18 and over, there were 95.7 males.

The median income for a household in the CDP was $63,262, and the median income for a family was $67,169. Males had a median income of $50,294 versus $28,698 for females. The per capita income for the CDP was $23,981. About 0.8% of families and 1.2% of the population were below the poverty line, including 0.6% of those under age 18 and none of those age 65 or over.
