= Calvert Cliffs' Coordinating Committee, Inc. v. Atomic Energy Commission =

1971 United States court decision

Calvert Cliffs' Coordinating Committee, Inc. v. United States Atomic Energy Commission is a 1971 United States court decision which provided the first important court interpretation of the National Environmental Policy Act (NEPA).

== Background ==
In 1966, the Baltimore Gas and Electric Company (BG&E) purchased property in Calvert County, Maryland along Chesapeake Bay. The company bought the property with the intention of building a nuclear power plant along the shoreline and applied for a nuclear power plant license. The utility began construction on the plant in 1968.

Concerned about the impacts to the Chesapeake Bay's blue crab population, scientists from Johns Hopkins University analyzed the plant's potential impacts on the Chesapeake Bay ecosystem. The scientists' apprehension about the potential adverse impacts of the plant's radioactive emissions as well as the discharge of heated cooling water into the bay led to the formation of the Calvert Cliffs' Coordinating Committee. The committee challenged in court the decision by the U.S. Atomic Energy Commission (AEC) to license the power plant.

== The issue ==
After the passage of NEPA in 1970, the AEC revised its licensing rules to comply with the new law. The newly revised rules stated that while a utility company must provide an environmental report for each proposed plant, the AEC hearing board did not have a mandate to consider the environmental impacts of each new plant unless a challenge was issued to a specific plant. Calvert Cliffs' Coordinating Committee argued that the AEC rules were inadequate and a direct violation of NEPA's Environmental impact statement requirement.

== Decision ==
In 1971 Judge J. Skelly Wright of the D.C. Circuit Court ruled that the AEC was required to consider the environmental impacts of licensing a nuclear power plant, regardless of whether a challenge was raised or not. The Court took the ruling a step further and made NEPA judicially enforceable by establishing procedural and substantive provisions for how federal agencies should comply with NEPA. Judge Wright ruled that the Atomic Energy Commission's rules were deficient and required revision.

=== Holdings ===
The court made several key decisions regarding how federal agencies comply with NEPA:

1. The general substantive policy in Section 101 of NEPA is flexible.
2. The procedural provisions in Section 102 of NEPA are not as flexible and were created to ensure that federal agencies comply with the substantive discretion they have been granted.
3. Every federal agency and department is required to consider environmental protection and "to take environmental values into account".
4. How agencies balance environmental issues with other agency priorities should be disclosed in a detailed statement in accordance with NEPA Section 102.
5. Federal agencies must carry out NEPA's procedural duties "to the fullest extent possible".
6. Federal agencies must conduct a careful and informed decision-making process in accordance with Section 102 of NEPA. Section 102 of NEPA also creates judicially enforceable duties.
7. Federal agencies must take into account the findings of the environmental reports in their decision-making processes.
8. The federal agency with the responsibility for a project or action is the only appropriate entity to balance environmental costs with economic and technical benefits.
9. NEPA requires federal agencies to consider alternatives that would reduce environmental damage.
10. Postponing the operation of a facility does not qualify as a reasonable explanation for eliminating the consideration of environmental issues under NEPA.

== Results of the decision ==
As a result of the decision, the AEC halted the licensing of all nuclear plants for eighteen months in order to modify its licensing rules to comply with NEPA. BG&E decided to pursue the operation of the Calvert Cliffs plant and released an Environmental Impact Statement. The final environmental report determined that the proposed operation of the nuclear plant would have no major adverse effect to the environment. The AEC granted BG&E an operating license for its first reactor in 1974 and the plant began producing energy in 1975.
