= Long Beach, Maryland =

- Census-designated place
- Location within Maryland
- Coordinates: 38°27′39″N 76°28′08″W
- Country: United States
- State: Maryland
- County: Calvert

Area
  - Total: 1.69 sq mi (4.38 km^{2})
  - Land: 1.67 sq mi (4.33 km^{2})
  - Water: 0.019 sq mi (0.05 km^{2})
- Elevation: 33 ft (10 m)

Population (2020)
  - Total: 1,739
  - Density: 1,041.2/sq mi (402.01/km^{2})
- Time zone: UTC−5 (Eastern (EST))
  - Summer (DST): UTC−4 (EDT)
- Area codes: 410, 443, & 667
- GNIS feature ID: 590694

Long Beach is a census-designated place and unincorporated community in Calvert County, Maryland, United States. Its population was 1,821 as of the 2010 census. Prior to 2010, the community was part of the Calvert Beach-Long Beach CDP.

== Demographics ==
Historical population
Census	Pop.	Note	%±
2020	1,739		—
U.S. Decennial Census

=== 2020 census ===
As of the 2020 census, Long Beach had a population of 1,739. The median age was 43.2 years. 21.3% of residents were under the age of 18 and 17.5% of residents were 65 years of age or older. For every 100 females there were 102.4 males, and for every 100 females age 18 and over there were 102.2 males age 18 and over.

0.0% of residents lived in urban areas, while 100.0% lived in rural areas.

There were 635 households in Long Beach, of which 36.7% had children under the age of 18 living in them. Of all households, 58.9% were married-couple households, 14.3% were households with a male householder and no spouse or partner present, and 16.7% were households with a female householder and no spouse or partner present. About 16.3% of all households were made up of individuals and 7.9% had someone living alone who was 65 years of age or older.

There were 751 housing units, of which 15.4% were vacant. The homeowner vacancy rate was 3.2% and the rental vacancy rate was 7.8%.

Racial composition as of the 2020 census
Race	Number	Percent
White	1,410	81.1%
Black or African American	127	7.3%
American Indian and Alaska Native	1	0.1%
Asian	13	0.7%
Native Hawaiian and Other Pacific Islander	1	0.1%
Some other race	40	2.3%
Two or more races	147	8.5%
Hispanic or Latino (of any race)	83	4.8%
