= Cove Point LNG =

LNG terminal in the United States

Coordinates: 38.389°N 76.408°W

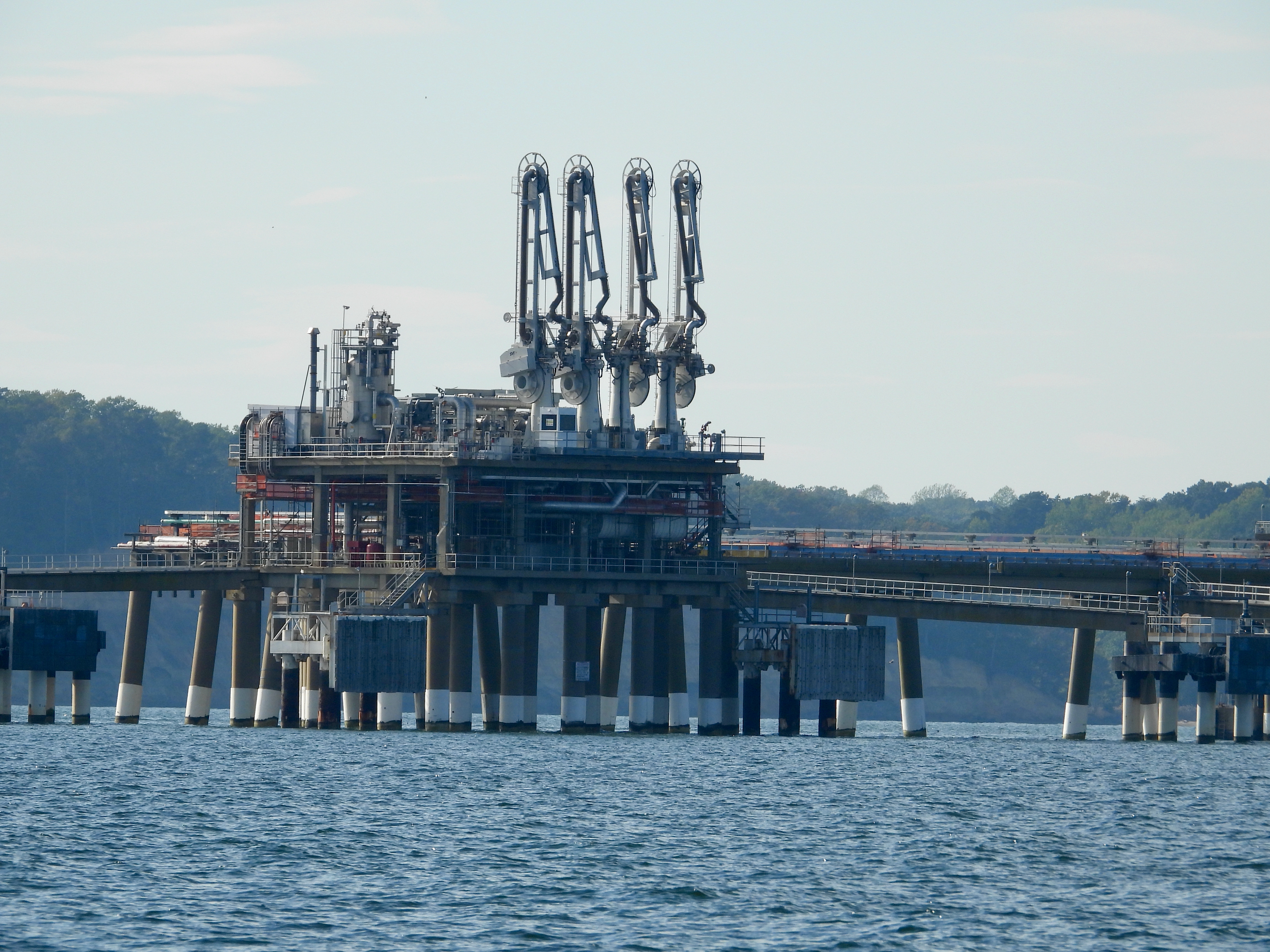
The offshore pier, seen from the Chesapeake Bay

Cove Point LNG Terminal is an offshore liquid natural gas shipping terminal operated by BHE GT&S, a Berkshire Hathaway Energy company. It is located near Lusby, Maryland, United States, on the western shore of the Chesapeake Bay, and exports and stores liquefied natural gas (LNG). LNG is exported on specially designed ships known as LNG carriers.

The shipping dock is located about 2.3 kilometres (1.4 mi) from the plant's storage tanks and is connected by pipes in an underwater tunnel. The site also contains a liquefaction plant. BHE GT&S has full operational control of the facility and shares a 75% ownership with Brookfield Infrastructure Partners (25%), investing through its Super Core-infrastructure fund.

== History ==
The facility was originally certified in 1972 for the importation of Algerian LNG for resale through the Columbia Gas Transmission and Consolidated Natural Gas pipeline systems. Cove Point began receiving LNG imported from Algeria between 1978 and 1980.

On October 6, 1979, LNG vapors leaking from a pump exploded, causing one death, one critical injury, and major damage to the facility.

The Algerians requested a higher price for the LNG, which the company found unacceptable, so shipment volume decreased and the terminal fell into disuse.

In 1994, the facility was transformed into a facility to store domestic natural gas. A liquefaction unit was installed that cools natural gas to the point where it becomes a liquid, around −162 °C (−260 °F). The facility continued to use the original LNG storage tanks and gasifier units. Both the storage and import activity are subject to regulation by the Federal Energy Regulatory Commission (FERC) under the Natural Gas Act.

In 2001, various parties agreed to resume imports at the facility, while continuing its storage operations. Following the construction of a fifth LNG storage tank, imports resumed in the summer of 2003. Imported LNG suppliers include BG LNG, Shell LNG, and Statoil. In 2006, FERC authorized a further expansion of Cove Point's import capacity on an unregulated basis, with Statoil holding the expanded capacity. Storage capacity has recently expanded from 7.8 billion cubic feet of natural gas to the current 14.6 billion cubic feet.

In 2020, Berkshire Hathaway Energy took a 25 percent stake in the facility. In 2023, BHE acquired an additional 50% ownership position from Dominion.

== Expansion of facility to export LNG ==
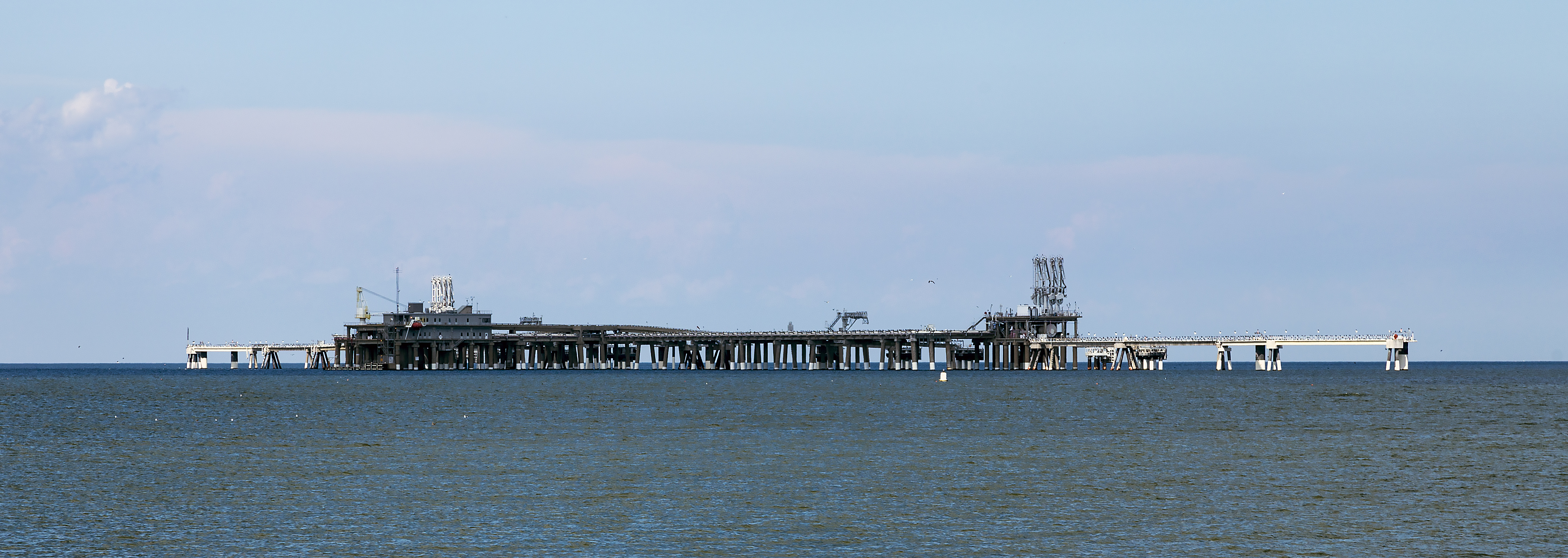
The offshore pier, seen from shore

On 1 April 2013, Dominion filed an application with the FERC (Docket Number CP13-113) for expansion of the Cove Point facilities for gas liquefaction and export. The proposed expansion was projected to cost $3.4 billion to $3.8 billion. The export project was completed in early 2018, making the facility bidirectional (being capable of importation and exportation of LNG). The export facility has the capacity to handle 1.8 billion cubic feet (51 million cubic metres) per day of natural gas.

== Environmental ==
The Cove Point facility resides on 1,000 acres on the Chesapeake Bay with operations only utilizing approximately 15%, or 131 acres of the site. The balance is in permanent conservation. The plant maintains the strictest leak detection and repair program in Maryland and Cove Point has received awards for environmental stewardship.

Cove Point LNG was awarded LEED Certification in 2018, making it the first LEED building in Calvert County, Maryland. The facility consumes 32% less energy and 40% less water in restrooms than a similar facility of its size.

In 2008, a large nor'easter storm created a breach of the Cove Point Marsh, a 190-acre Maryland Heritage Area, located on the western shore of the Chesapeake Bay. The breach caused significant damage and threatened the freshwater marsh ecosystem with the intrusion of the bay's brackish water. The marsh is documented to be home to over forty rare, threatened or endangered plant species that could have been destroyed by the event. A restoration effort was conducted using over 33,000 tons of rock and 10,000 tons of sand, a 2,600-ft revetment was created to restore the marsh and re-stabilize its ecosystem. As part of the project, Cove Point operations have been conducting routine surveillance and reporting progress on the ecosystem's recovery. In recognition of its environmental stewardship, Cove Point LNG was awarded the National Environmental Excellence Award by the National Association of Environmental Professionals and the "Hero of the Chesapeake Bay" by the Maryland Legislative Sportsmen's Foundation.

== Controversies ==
In 2001, when the plant was scheduled to reopen, many local residents were concerned about the proximity to Calvert Cliffs Nuclear Power Plant (3 miles), and the damage that could be caused by an attack or an explosion at the plant. Residents thought that the FERC did not consider the risks before opening the plant.

Because the LNG at Cove Point contains a higher heat content than domestic natural gas, a local gas utility which receives LNG from Cove Point, Washington Gas Light Company, complained in 2005 that its customers were adversely affected by this "hot" gas. As a result, the parties agreed to limit the heat content of the output of the terminal to 1075 Btu per ft^{3} (40.05 MJ/m^{3}) by diluting it with nitrogen gas.

Subsequently, Washington Gas Light experienced a 16-fold increase in gas leaks on residential service connections in Prince George's County, Maryland, which is served directly by pipeline from the plant. These leaks come from mechanical couplings which contain rubber gaskets. Washington Gas Light claims that because the Cove Point gas has less hexane and other heavy hydrocarbons than does domestic natural gas, the Cove Point gas causes the gaskets to dry out and leak. Cove Point disputes these claims and argues that Washington Gas's arguments are flawed and the expansion will not cause additional leaks in the District of Columbia and Northern Virginia suburbs as the area served by unblended LNG increases.

In 2006, Cove Point filed a rate increase with FERC proposing to raise the prices it charges to pipelines serving customers in Georgia, North Carolina, Virginia, and Maryland by 109 percent.
