= Flag Ponds Nature Park =

Nature preserve in Lusby, Maryland, United States

- IUCN category V (protected landscape/seascape)
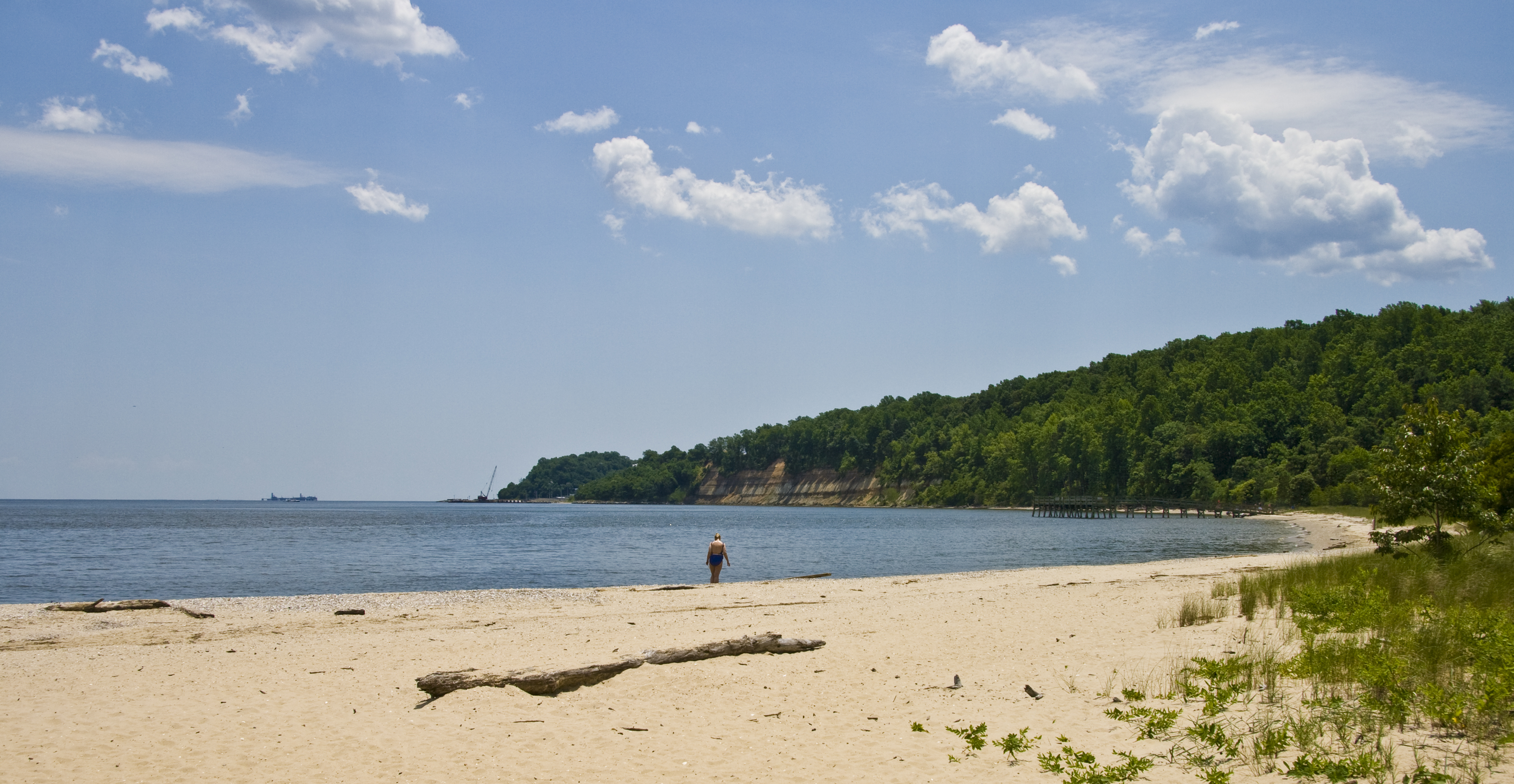
- Beach at Flag Ponds looking south

- Location within Maryland
- Location: Calvert, Maryland, United States
- Coordinates: 38°26′48.8″N 76°27′30″W
- Operator: Calvert County Parks
- Website: Flag Ponds Nature Park

Flag Ponds Nature Park is a nature preserve located in Lusby, Maryland along the Chesapeake Bay in Calvert County, Maryland. It is operated by the Calvert County Department of Natural Resources. The park includes nature trails and a beach for swimmers. Fossil shark's teeth eroded from the Calvert Cliffs formation may be collected on the beach. The area included in the park was once a center for pound net fishing from the early 1900s through 1955. One fishing shanty remained until October 2012 when it burned down. It has since been rebuilt.
