= Scientists Cliffs, Maryland =

Unincorporated community in Maryland, United States

Scientists' Cliffs, Maryland
- Unincorporated community
- Location within Maryland Location within the United States
- Coordinates: 38°31′03″N 76°30′48″W
- Country: United States
- State: Maryland
- County: Calvert
- Elevation: 105 ft (32 m)
- Time zone: UTC-5 (Eastern (EST))
  - Summer (DST): UTC-4 (EDT)
- ZIP code: 20676
- Area codes: 410, 443, and 667
- GNIS feature ID: 591239

Scientists' Cliffs is an unincorporated community in Calvert County, Maryland, United States. Other names used for the community include Annes Aggravation, Flippos Folly, Pathologists Quagmire.

The private community was first established in 1935 as a summer colony for scientists by Flippo and Annie Gravatt. The founders of Scientists' Cliffs chose this land because the population of American Chestnut trees showed a particular resistance to the blight. Original cabins in the area were built from felled American Chestnut trees that died from the blight. Although established as a seasonal community, the first year-round resident moved to the community in 1943.

In 1986, when residents of Scientists' Cliffs heard that forests and abandoned farms surrounding their homes were up for sale, possibly to developers, they chipped in and bought the land. A tract of 436 wooded acres near the Chesapeake Bay became the "American Chestnut Land Trust." In the years since its founding, ACLT has expanded its land preservation by partnering with the Nature Conservancy and the Maryland Department of Natural Resources. By 2019, over 4,000 acres surrounding Scientists' Cliffs have been preserved.

The community is accessed by Scientists Cliffs Road and divided into five sub-sections, called "Gates," though it is not a "gated" community. Gates are named Gate A, Gate B, Gate C, Gate D, and Gate E, respectively. The streets in each gate all begin with the corresponding letter of the gate, and are botanically named. For example, Gate A features streets named Aster, Aspen, Azalea, etc., Gate B features streets named Birch, Beech and Bluebell, and so forth.

All five gates have direct access to the Chesapeake Bay via a series of paths and wooden boardwalks. Additionally, Gate A features a community center, a residential swimming pool, tennis courts, horseshoe pit, a baseball field, a recycling center, and a private beach referred to as "South Beach".

Another feature of Scientists' Cliffs is that a restrictive covenant requires all houses within the community to have a wooden exterior, giving the homes a distinctively rustic look. Recently, however, environmentally neutral cement-based siding such as "Hardie board" has been allowed.

The tall cliffs along the edge of the bay contain one of the world's richest fossil deposits from the Miocene period. The cliffs are part of the Calvert Formation. Carcharodon megalodon teeth are found in this area.
