= Calvert Beach, Maryland =

Calvert Beach
- Census-designated place
- Location within Maryland
- Coordinates: 38°27′57″N 76°28′38″W
- Country: United States
- State: Maryland
- County: Calvert

Area
  - Total: 0.82 sq mi (2.13 km^{2})
  - Land: 0.82 sq mi (2.13 km^{2})
  - Water: 0 sq mi (0.00 km^{2})
- Elevation: 46 ft (14 m)

Population (2020)
  - Total: 791
  - Density: 960/sq mi (370.8/km^{2})
- Time zone: UTC−5 (Eastern (EST))
  - Summer (DST): UTC−4 (EDT)
- ZIP code: 20685
- Area codes: 410, 443, & 667
- GNIS feature ID: 589877

Calvert Beach is a census-designated place and unincorporated community in Calvert County, Maryland, United States. Its population was 808 as of the 2010 census. Prior to 2010, the community was part of the Calvert Beach-Long Beach CDP.

== Demographics ==
Historical population
Census	Pop.	Note	%±
2020	791		—
U.S. Decennial Census
