= Lusby, Maryland =

- Census-designated place
- Location of Lusby, Maryland
- Coordinates: 38°21′13″N 76°26′12″W
- Country: United States
- State: Maryland
- County: Calvert

Area
  - Total: 3.68 sq mi (9.53 km^{2})
  - Land: 3.51 sq mi (9.10 km^{2})
  - Water: 0.17 sq mi (0.43 km^{2})
- Elevation: 105 ft (32 m)

Population (2020)
  - Total: 2,072
  - Density: 589.8/sq mi (227.72/km^{2})
- Time zone: UTC−5 (Eastern (EST))
  - Summer (DST): UTC−4 (EDT)
- ZIP code: 20657
- Area code: 410
- FIPS code: 24-48800
- GNIS feature ID: 0590708

Lusby is an unincorporated community and census-designated place (CDP) in Calvert County, Maryland, United States. The population of the CDP was 1,835 at the 2010 census. Residents of the Chesapeake Ranch Estates and Drum Point communities also use the Lusby ZIP code designation.

== Geography ==
Lusby is located near the southern end of Calvert County at 38°21′13″N 76°26′12″W (38.353555, −76.436615). It is bordered to the southwest by Solomons, a tourist resort town, to the south by Drum Point (across tidal Mill Creek), and to the southeast by Chesapeake Ranch Estates, a large community governed by a homeowners' association.

Dominion Cove Point LNG, one of the nation's largest liquefied natural gas import facilities, is located just northeast of Lusby, and the Calvert Cliffs Nuclear Power Plant is 5 miles (8 km) to the north. Maryland Routes 2 and 4 run along the western edge of Lusby, leading south to the Patuxent River Naval Air Station and north to Andrews Air Force Base and the Washington, D.C., and Annapolis areas.

There is one public high school in Lusby, Patuxent High School, with the mascot being the Panthers. In 2015 the Panthers won states in football. In 2016, the Panthers won states in marching band and got third place at nationals. In 2002 and 2013, the Panthers won Maryland high school volleyball championships, with multiple other teams reaching the state finals such as the football team in 2013 and 2001, the baseball team in 2012, and the field hockey team in 2008. Lusby also has a public middle school, Mill Creek Middle (6th grade through 8th grade) and two public elementary schools, Patuxent Elementary (Pre-K through 2nd grade) and Appeal (3rd-5th grade). While there are no private schools in Lusby, there is one in Solomon's Island at Our Lady Star of the Sea Church that serves the area and has Pre-K through 8th grade.

Lusby's central business district has been growing rapidly in recent years. Three shopping centers have recently been built, bringing in new grocery stores, restaurants, and other businesses. Several new roads have either been built or are in planning stages in order to ease traffic congestion to and from the Chesapeake Ranch Estates-Drum Point communities. Lusby also features Cove Point Park, which has numerous baseball, soccer, and lacrosse fields as well as a public swimming pool. There is a public golf course, Chesapeake Hills Golf Course, near Cove Point Park. There is also a private air field owned and operated by the Chesapeake Ranch Estates and Drum Point communities.

Places of note in the Lusby area include the Cove Point Lighthouse on the Chesapeake Bay and Calvert Cliffs State Park. The lighthouse was listed on the National Register of Historic Places in 1973. Also on the National Register are Middleham Chapel and Morgan Hill Farm.

According to the United States Census Bureau, the Lusby CDP has a total area of 3.7 square miles (9.5 km^{2}), of which 3.5 square miles (9.1 km^{2}) is land and 0.15 square miles (0.4 km^{2}), or 4.51%, is water.

== Demographics ==
Historical population
| Census | Pop. | Note | %± |
|---|---|---|---|
| 2000 | 1,666 | | — |
| 2010 | 1,835 | | 10.1% |
| 2020 | 2,072 | | 12.9% |
U.S. Decennial Census

=== 2020 census ===
As of the 2020 census, Lusby had a population of 2,072. The median age was 40.2 years. 22.1% of residents were under the age of 18 and 15.7% of residents were 65 years of age or older. For every 100 females there were 99.8 males, and for every 100 females age 18 and over there were 93.5 males age 18 and over.

100.0% of residents lived in urban areas, while 0.0% lived in rural areas.

There were 819 households in Lusby, of which 27.8% had children under the age of 18 living in them. Of all households, 47.0% were married-couple households, 20.0% were households with a male householder and no spouse or partner present, and 26.9% were households with a female householder and no spouse or partner present. About 34.3% of all households were made up of individuals and 19.2% had someone living alone who was 65 years of age or older.

There were 866 housing units, of which 5.4% were vacant. The homeowner vacancy rate was 2.7% and the rental vacancy rate was 2.4%.

Racial composition as of the 2020 census
| Race | Number | Percent |
|---|---|---|
| White | 1,399 | 67.5% |
| Black or African American | 445 | 21.5% |
| American Indian and Alaska Native | 7 | 0.3% |
| Asian | 30 | 1.4% |
| Native Hawaiian and Other Pacific Islander | 0 | 0.0% |
| Some other race | 30 | 1.4% |
| Two or more races | 161 | 7.8% |
| Hispanic or Latino (of any race) | 100 | 4.8% |

=== 2000 census ===
As of the census of 2000, there were 1,666 people, 595 households, and 433 families residing in the CDP. The population density was 476.1 inhabitants per square mile (183.8/km^{2}). There were 656 housing units at an average density of 187.5 per square mile (72.4/km^{2}). The racial makeup of the CDP was 72.15% White, 24.73% African American, 0.18% Native American, 0.66% Asian, 0.66% from other races, and 1.62% from two or more races. Hispanic or Latino of any race were 2.76% of the population.

There were 595 households, out of which 35.5% had children under the age of 18 living with them, 57.0% were married couples living together, 11.3% had a female householder with no husband present, and 27.2% were non-families. 23.9% of all households were made up of individuals, and 12.8% had someone living alone who was 65 years of age or older. The average household size was 2.79 and the average family size was 3.32.

In the CDP, the population was spread out, with 28.5% under the age of 18, 6.5% from 18 to 24, 31.9% from 25 to 44, 20.1% from 45 to 64, and 13.0% who were 65 years of age or older. The median age was 36 years. For every 100 females, there were 93.5 males. For every 100 females age 18 and over, there were 93.7 males.

The median income for a household in the CDP was $40,769, and the median income for a family was $51,964. Males had a median income of $46,190 versus $26,429 for females. The per capita income for the CDP was $19,932. About 5.3% of families and 4.5% of the population were below the poverty line, including 4.3% of those under age 18 and 5.6% of those age 65 or over.

== Notable people ==
- Robin Lundberg (born 1981), American sports broadcaster
