= Cove Point Light =

Lighthouse in Maryland, United States

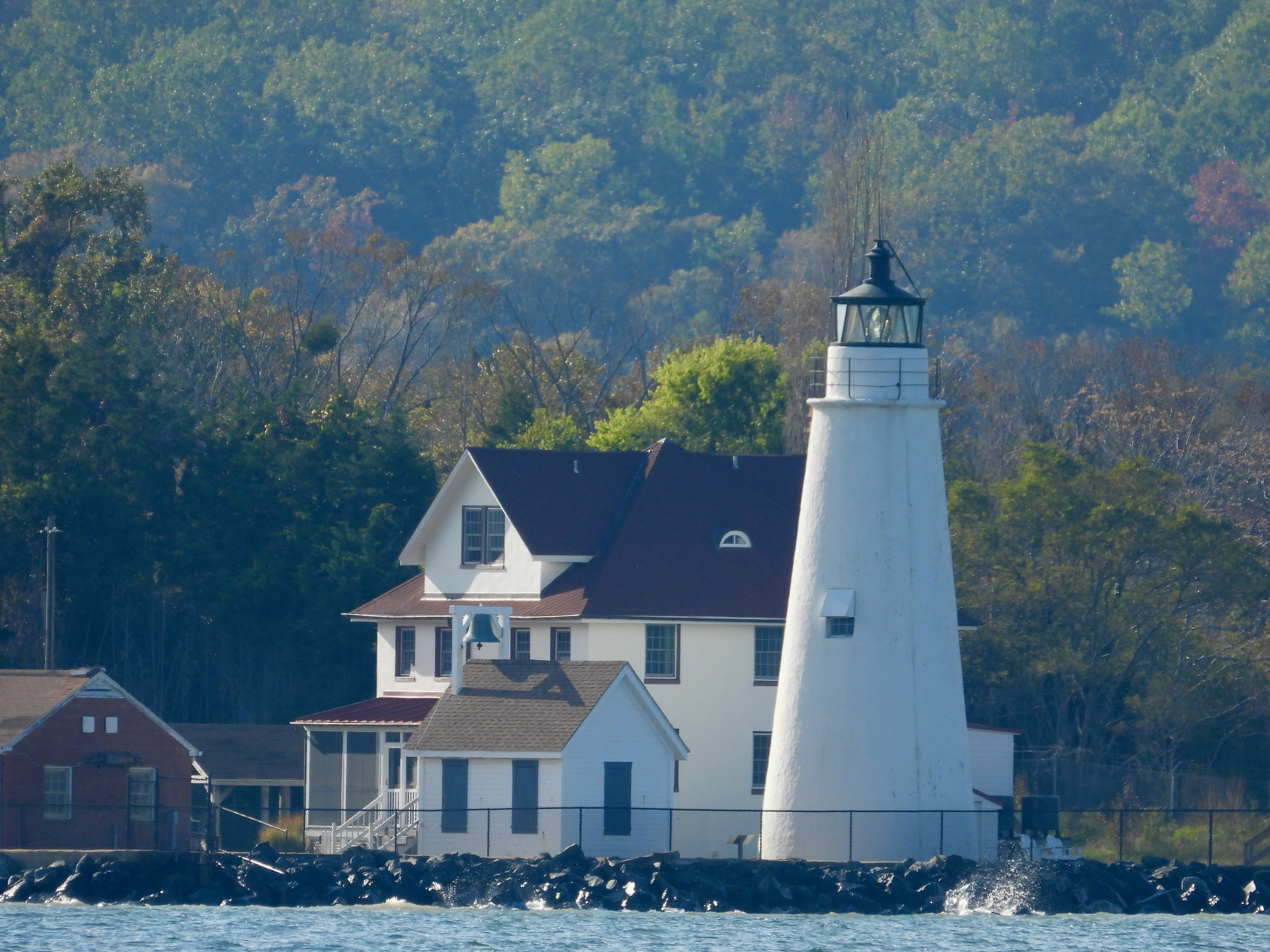
- Lighthouse and associated structures in 2025
- Location: on Cove Point just south of Calvert Cliffs State Park
- Coordinates: 38°23′10.5″N 76°22′54.3″W

Tower
- Constructed: 1828
- Construction: brick
- Automated: 1986
- Height: 16 m (52 ft)
- Shape: conical tower
- Markings: White
- Heritage: National Register of Historic Places listed place

Light
- First lit: 1828
- Focal height: 45 feet (14 m)
- Lens: fourth-order Fresnel lens
- Range: 16.5 nautical miles (30.6 km; 19.0 mi)
- Characteristic: Flashing white, 10 sec.
- Cove Point Lighthouse
- U.S. National Register of Historic Places
- Area: 4 acres (1.6 ha)
- NRHP reference No.: 73000907
- Added to NRHP: April 11, 1973

The Cove Point Light is a lighthouse located on the west side of the Chesapeake Bay in Calvert County, Maryland.

== History ==
This light was built in 1828 by John Donahoo, who erected a brick conical tower along the plan he had used at several other sites in the Bay. In 1825 Congress had allocated funds to build a light at Cedar Point, four miles south at the mouth of the Patuxent River, but further consideration led to a decision to mark Cove Point and the shoal which jutted into the bay. A new appropriation in 1828 allowed construction of the light and keeper's house in the same year.

The original Argand lamps were replaced in 1855 with a fifth-order Fresnel lens; this in turn was upgraded to a fourth-order lens in 1857. A fog bell added in 1837 was moved several times and was mounted on both wood and iron towers before ending up on the roof of a wooden shed built in 1902 to house a foghorn. The foghorn equipment was moved in 1950 to a separate brick building, but the fog bell remains on the shed. Erosion was a significant problem, but was eventually brought under control through a seawall initially constructed in 1892 and upgraded in 1913 and 1993.

The keeper's house was enlarged in 1881 when it was converted to a duplex with housing for two keepers and their families. and again in 1925 when inside kitchens were installed. In 1950 a separate small house was built as home to a third keeper and his family.

It was added to the National Register of Historic Places in 1973 as Cove Point Lighthouse. The keepers remained until 1986 when the light was finally automated. The light was in good condition, with much equipment remaining from prior years, when it was turned over to Calvert County in 2000. Since then it has been administered by the Calvert Marine Museum, which allows access to the light and grounds in the summer months.

Cove Point remains an active aid to navigation and is the oldest continuously operating lighthouse on the Chesapeake Bay.
