= Drum Point, Maryland =

- Census-designated place
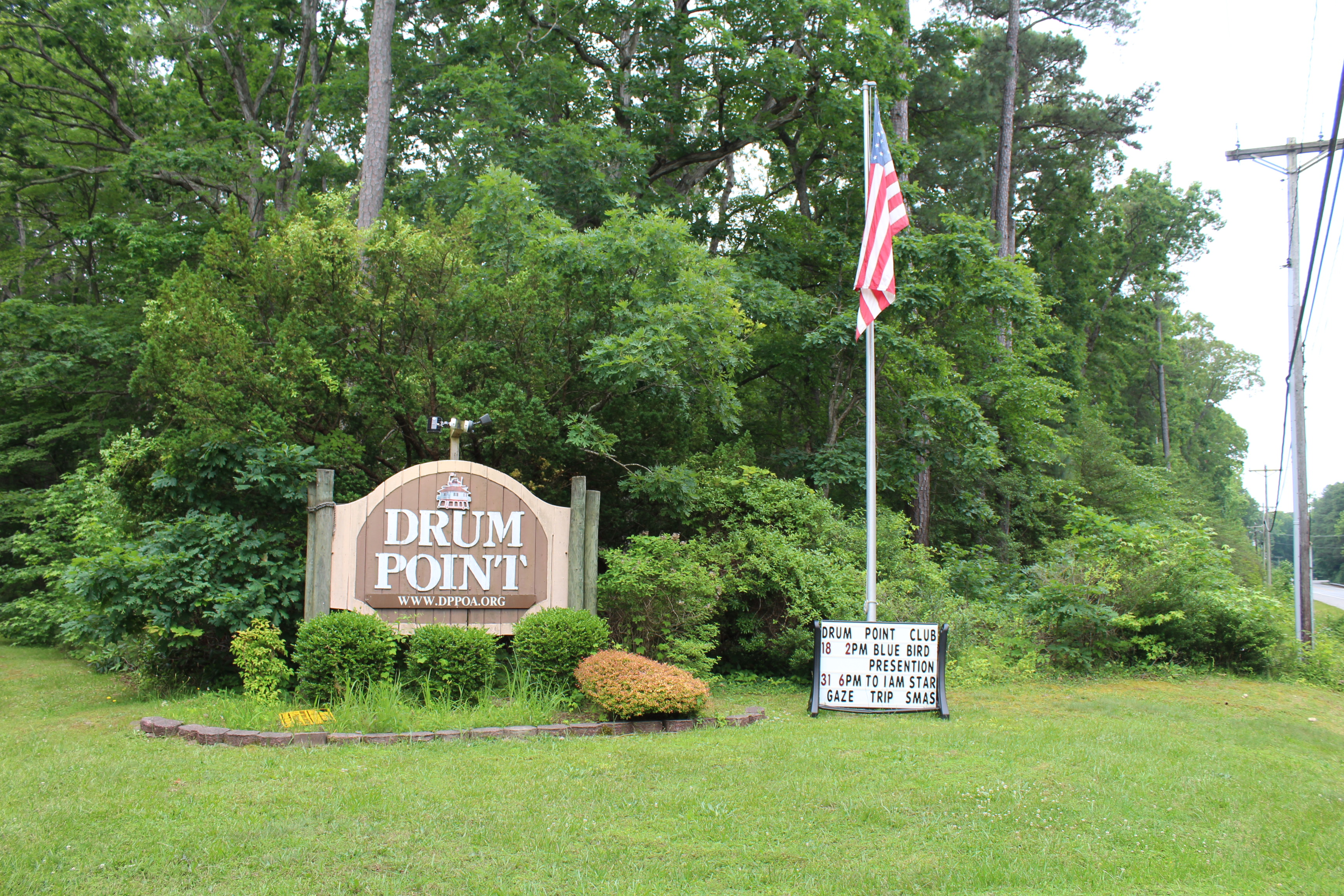

- Location within Maryland
- Coordinates: 38°19′42″N 76°26′8″W
- Country: United States
- State: Maryland
- County: Calvert

Area
  - Total: 1.84 sq mi (4.76 km^{2})
  - Land: 1.66 sq mi (4.31 km^{2})
  - Water: 0.17 sq mi (0.45 km^{2})
- Elevation: 21 ft (6.4 m)

Population (2020)
  - Total: 2,553
  - Density: 1,533.4/sq mi (592.04/km^{2})
- Time zone: UTC-5 (Eastern (EST))
  - Summer (DST): UTC-4 (EDT)
- ZIP code: 20657
- Area codes: 410, 443, & 667
- GNIS feature ID: 590111

Drum Point is a census-designated place (CDP) in southern Calvert County, Maryland, United States, at the confluence of the Patuxent River with the Chesapeake Bay. As of the 2010 census, the CDP had a population of 2,731. Prior to 2010 it was part of the Chesapeake Ranch Estates-Drum Point CDP.

== Demographics ==
Historical population
Census	Pop.	Note	%±
2020	2,553		—
U.S. Decennial Census

=== 2020 census ===
As of the 2020 census, Drum Point had a population of 2,553. The median age was 42.6 years. 20.5% of residents were under the age of 18 and 17.8% of residents were 65 years of age or older. For every 100 females there were 98.1 males, and for every 100 females age 18 and over there were 100.4 males age 18 and over.

100.0% of residents lived in urban areas, while 0.0% lived in rural areas.

There were 1,006 households in Drum Point, of which 29.0% had children under the age of 18 living in them. Of all households, 53.9% were married-couple households, 18.0% were households with a male householder and no spouse or partner present, and 19.9% were households with a female householder and no spouse or partner present. About 24.2% of all households were made up of individuals and 8.5% had someone living alone who was 65 years of age or older.

There were 1,189 housing units, of which 15.4% were vacant. The homeowner vacancy rate was 2.1% and the rental vacancy rate was 6.0%.

Racial composition as of the 2020 census
Race	Number	Percent
White	2,071	81.1%
Black or African American	216	8.5%
American Indian and Alaska Native	9	0.4%
Asian	42	1.6%
Native Hawaiian and Other Pacific Islander	2	0.1%
Some other race	27	1.1%
Two or more races	186	7.3%
Hispanic or Latino (of any race)	74	2.9%
