= Chesapeake Ranch Estates, Maryland =

- Census-designated place
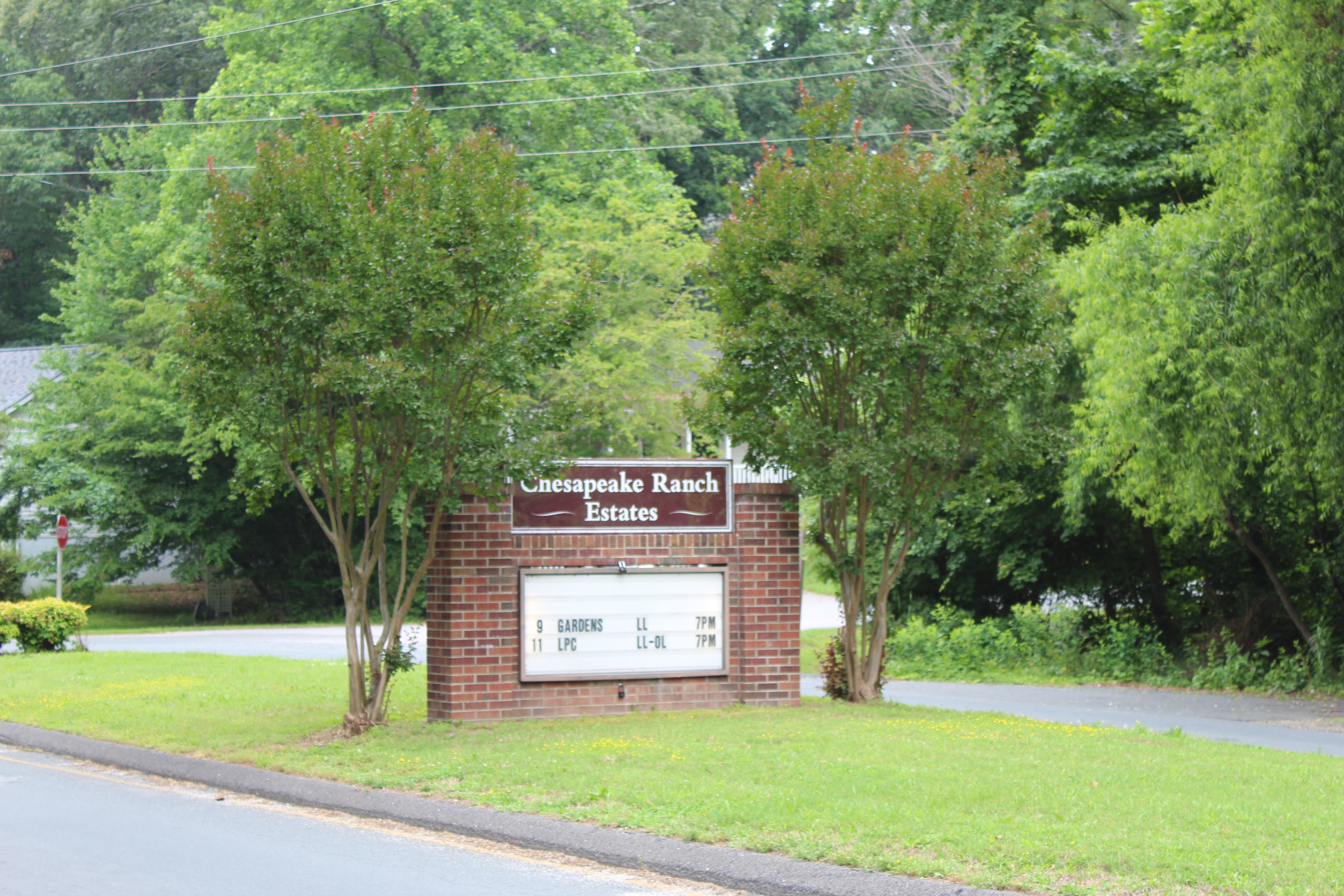

- Location within Maryland
- Coordinates: 38°20′46″N 76°25′04″W
- Country: United States
- State: Maryland
- County: Calvert

Area
  - Total: 4.51 sq mi (11.69 km^{2})
  - Land: 4.32 sq mi (11.19 km^{2})
  - Water: 0.19 sq mi (0.50 km^{2})
- Elevation: 108 ft (33 m)

Population (2020)
  - Total: 10,308
  - Density: 2,386.6/sq mi (921.49/km^{2})
- Time zone: UTC−5 (Eastern (EST))
  - Summer (DST): UTC−4 (EDT)
- ZIP code: 20657
- Area codes: 410, 443, and 667
- GNIS feature ID: 1676560

The Chesapeake Ranch Estates (CRE), also known locally as the Ranch Club, is located in Lusby, Maryland, United States, in southern Calvert County. CRE was founded in 1958 and is governed by a homeowners' association, which is officially called the "Property Owner's Association of the Chesapeake Ranch Estates" (POACRE). Today, CRE is composed of over 4,000 homes. The community is counted as a census-designated place for population statistics, with a residential population of 10,519 as of the 2010 census. At the 2000 census, the area was part of the Chesapeake Ranch Estates-Drum Point CDP.

== Demographics ==
Historical population
Census	Pop.	Note	%±
2020	10,308		—
U.S. Decennial Census

=== 2020 census ===
As of the 2020 census, Chesapeake Ranch Estates had a population of 10,308. The median age was 34.9 years. 26.4% of residents were under the age of 18 and 9.5% of residents were 65 years of age or older. For every 100 females there were 96.2 males, and for every 100 females age 18 and over there were 94.7 males age 18 and over.

100.0% of residents lived in urban areas, while 0.0% lived in rural areas.

There were 3,460 households in Chesapeake Ranch Estates, of which 39.8% had children under the age of 18 living in them. Of all households, 54.4% were married-couple households, 14.3% were households with a male householder and no spouse or partner present, and 22.1% were households with a female householder and no spouse or partner present. About 17.5% of all households were made up of individuals and 6.3% had someone living alone who was 65 years of age or older.

There were 3,772 housing units, of which 8.3% were vacant. The homeowner vacancy rate was 2.9% and the rental vacancy rate was 3.5%.

Racial composition as of the 2020 census
Race	Number	Percent
White	7,349	71.3%
Black or African American	1,608	15.6%
American Indian and Alaska Native	52	0.5%
Asian	136	1.3%
Native Hawaiian and Other Pacific Islander	0	0.0%
Some other race	157	1.5%
Two or more races	1,006	9.8%
Hispanic or Latino (of any race)	602	5.8%

== Amenities ==
The CRE is close to the attractions of Solomons Island as well as in proximity to Naval Air Station Patuxent River. There are several public schools within a ten-mile radius of the community. The community maintains two private Chesapeake Bay beaches: Driftwood Beach and Seahorse Beach, and one manmade lake: Lake Lariat. CRE has a small airfield, a horseshoes field, a duck pond, and a camp ground. CRE is also home to part of the world-famous Calvert Cliffs. The cliffs are made of sand and clay with clearly visible layers. Over 600 species of fossils have been identified from all of Calvert Cliffs. The cliffs are easily accessible from Seahorse Beach but are off-limits due to the danger of collapse.

CRE is an unincorporated community protected 24/7 by security guards. Today, access to the beaches and other similar amenities is closed to non-members, however access to the roads around the community are open to all.

== Current issues ==
Currently POACRE was approved by request to become a special tax district in the county, that would raise an estimated $5,750,000 needed to repair the roads.

Lake Lariat has a history of pollution ranging from runoff, to algae blooms, and also mercury. An ongoing effort has been made to clean the lake, and freshwater clams have been placed in the lake to help alleviate the problems. The lake also has an ongoing fish consumption advisory since 2002 by the Maryland Department of the Environment due to confirmed high levels of mercury in fish tissue in the lake, five times past the legally allowable, as all fish in Maryland have this advisory.

Recently, a growing movement has occurred to restructure POACRE or even make it a public subdivision as a solution to the growing numbers of problems that the original homeowners' association was not designed to handle when originally conceived. The campgrounds have been opened up to allow camping from the public.

There have been some discussions concerning the governing documents of the POACRE. This matter was the subject of litigation in the case of Hanson vs. Calvert County, won by Calvert County and its co-defendant, Property Owners of Chesapeake Ranch Estates. It was alleged in this case that in 1989 the founders of POACRE illegally co-opted the powers of the developer (Chesapeake Ranch Club, Inc.) as declarant of the covenants.
