= Calvert Cliffs Nuclear Power Plant =

Nuclear power plant in Maryland, US

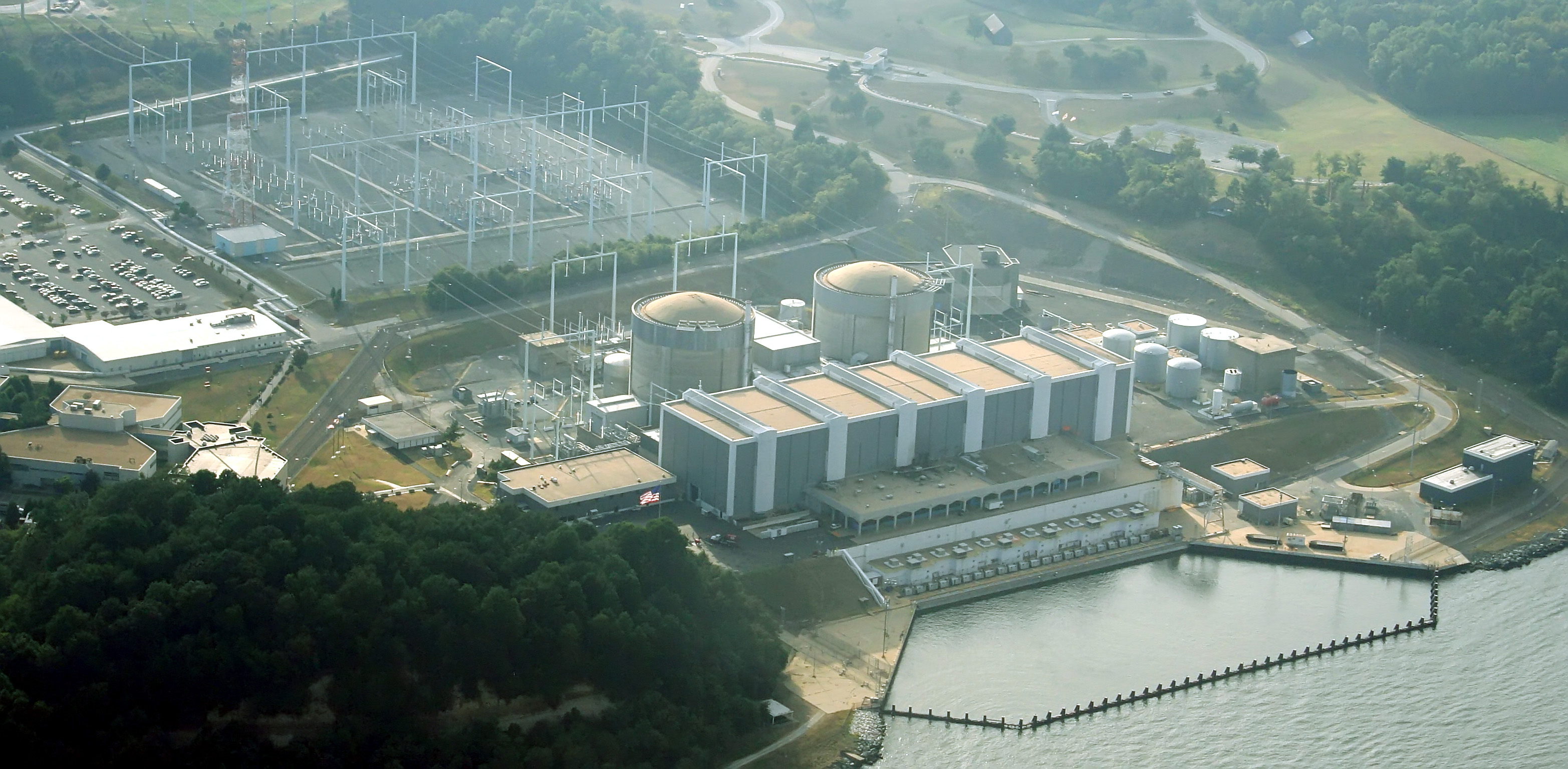
- Aerial view of Calvert Cliffs Nuclear Power Plant
- Country: United States
- Location: Calvert County, near Lusby, Maryland
- Coordinates: 38°25′55″N 76°26′32″W
- Status: Operational
- Construction began: June 1, 1968
- Commission date: Unit 1: May 8, 1975; Unit 2: April 1, 1977
- Construction cost: $3.43 billion in 2025 dollars
- Owner: Constellation Energy
- Operator: Constellation Energy

Nuclear power station
- Reactor type: PWR
- Reactor supplier: Combustion Engineering
- Cooling source: Chesapeake Bay
- Thermal capacity: 2 × 2737 MW_{th}

Power generation
- Units operational: 1 × 863 MW; 1 × 855 MW
- Make and model: CE 2-loop (DRYAMB)
- Units cancelled: 1 × 1600 MW US EPR
- Nameplate capacity: 1718 MW
- Capacity factor: 100.41% (2017); 82.90% (lifetime)
- Annual net output: 14,993 GWh (2021)

External links
- Website: Calvert Cliffs Nuclear Power Plant
- Commons: Related media on Commons

The Calvert Cliffs Nuclear Power Plant (CCNPP) is a nuclear power plant located on the western shore of the Chesapeake Bay near Lusby, Calvert County, Maryland, in the Mid-Atlantic United States. It is the only nuclear power plant in the state of Maryland.

== Overview ==
The plant is owned and operated by Constellation Energy and has two 2737 megawatt thermal (MWth) Combustion Engineering Generation II two-loop pressurized water reactors. Each generating plant (CCNPP 1&2) produces approximately 850 megawatt electrical (MWe) net or 900 MWe gross. Each plant's electrical load consumes approximately 50 MWe. These are saturated steam plants (non-superheated) and are approximately 33% efficient (ratio of 900 MWe gross/2700 MWth core). Only the exhaust of the single high-pressure main turbine is slightly superheated by a two-stage reheater before delivering the superheated steam in parallel to the three low-pressure turbines. Unit 1 uses a General Electric–designed main turbine and generator, while Unit 2 uses a Westinghouse–designed main turbine and generator. The heat produced by the reactor is returned to the bay, which operates as a cooling heat-sink for the plant.

Unit 1 went into commercial service in 1975 and Unit 2 in 1977. The total cost of the two units was approximately $766 million (equivalent to $4.07 billion in 2025). This nuclear power plant is also notable for being the subject of a 1971 court case which provided the first major court interpretation of new environmental regulations, finding that regulators must investigate environmental impact regardless of if a challenge had been filed or not.

Unit 1 had its two steam generators replaced in 2002 and its reactor vessel closure head replaced in 2006, while unit 2 had its two steam generators replaced in 2003, and its vessel closure head replaced in 2007.

The water around the plant (see lower-right-center of photograph) is a very popular place for anglers. Unit 1 & 2 each takes in bay water (from the fenced-in area) to cool its steam driven turbine condensers plus other bay-water–cooled primary and secondary system heat exchangers. The bay water is pumped out at a nominal flow rate of 1.2 million gallons per minute (75,000 L/s) per unit (Unit 1 and 2) for each steam turbine condenser. The water is returned to the bay no more than 12 °F (6.7 °C) warmer than the bay water. Unlike many other nuclear power plants, Calvert Cliffs did not have to utilize water cooling towers to return the hot water to its original temperature. As the water comes out very quickly and creates a sort of artificial rip current, it can be a dangerous place to fish. CCNPP 3 will only need about 10% of the bay cooling water volume needed for Unit 1 and 2 combined. The increase in fish and shellfish impingement and entrainment will be less than 3.5% over Unit 1 and 2 existing conditions.

In February 2009, Calvert Cliffs set a world record for pressurized water reactors (PWRs) by operating 692 days non-stop. In addition, Unit 2's capacity factor in 2008 was a world-record high of 101.37 percent.

On April 28, 2002, a violent EF4 tornado nearly impacted the power plant, causing no damage to the plant but resulted in 3 direct fatalities across Charles and Calvert county.

== Electricity production ==
In 2026, Amazon reached an agreement with Constellation Energy to increase the output to the regional grid by 190 megawatts.

Generation (MWh) of Calvert Cliffs Nuclear Power Plant
Year	Jan	Feb	Mar	Apr	May	Jun	Jul	Aug	Sep	Oct	Nov	Dec	Annual (Total)
2001	1,293,872	1,168,618	963,457	623,493	938,578	1,202,772	1,252,634	1,245,846	1,212,574	1,223,040	1,244,048	1,287,335	13,656,267
2002	1,288,202	862,457	645,092	619,921	639,467	829,551	1,146,622	1,242,220	1,211,273	1,271,399	1,079,479	1,292,322	12,128,005
2003	1,292,663	872,233	647,476	784,844	1,259,096	1,240,051	1,270,234	1,258,254	1,226,338	1,293,673	1,245,064	1,300,787	13,690,713
2004	1,245,680	1,218,948	1,261,451	816,454	1,104,627	1,250,809	1,278,968	1,272,708	1,231,056	1,301,634	1,274,705	1,323,220	14,580,260
2005	1,322,990	1,047,379	949,726	1,267,648	1,307,731	1,240,130	1,254,931	1,252,361	1,218,377	1,283,417	1,249,369	1,309,162	14,703,221
2006	1,296,648	992,845	648,193	1,014,558	1,303,841	1,246,405	1,264,266	1,258,643	1,233,168	1,287,865	1,153,244	1,130,735	13,830,411
2007	1,297,997	1,086,076	661,313	1,182,021	1,303,229	1,241,232	1,266,519	1,251,396	1,223,218	1,264,543	1,262,781	1,312,867	14,353,192
2008	1,315,326	1,069,745	976,840	1,262,420	1,292,113	1,231,842	1,242,086	1,235,296	1,213,153	1,273,123	1,261,192	1,305,559	14,678,695
2009	1,303,777	1,045,223	940,839	1,260,328	1,291,934	1,226,644	1,158,547	1,245,982	1,225,916	1,282,637	1,259,342	1,308,950	14,550,119
2010	1,312,339	743,084	806,878	1,257,938	1,140,982	1,208,350	1,228,584	1,234,815	1,214,634	1,280,334	1,256,430	1,309,580	13,993,948
2011	1,315,452	865,796	965,147	1,264,689	1,298,663	1,182,649	1,247,953	1,171,521	1,217,571	1,277,972	1,273,121	1,316,903	14,397,437
2012	1,316,989	662,951	649,574	1,051,724	1,309,178	1,244,799	1,170,262	1,147,869	1,230,720	1,301,649	1,196,588	1,296,963	13,579,266
2013	1,326,175	950,117	784,587	1,283,601	1,094,820	1,249,816	1,262,218	1,258,216	1,140,152	1,306,577	1,279,188	1,328,838	14,264,305
2014	1,131,490	920,341	885,275	1,284,065	1,258,025	1,238,371	1,237,907	1,262,348	1,226,067	1,296,681	1,277,023	1,325,741	14,343,334
2015	1,327,603	919,447	1,036,388	1,184,895	1,301,932	1,255,122	1,279,970	1,282,379	1,245,002	1,317,016	1,280,853	1,212,718	14,643,325
2016	1,277,060	905,712	1,081,688	1,280,694	1,311,965	1,232,424	1,280,694	1,268,992	1,241,410	1,304,576	1,279,860	1,295,102	14,760,177
2017	1,329,771	853,695	1,215,964	1,294,186	1,328,553	1,271,137	1,298,704	1,293,666	1,265,599	1,316,555	1,295,563	1,343,595	15,106,988
2018	1,346,338	960,036	972,281	1,287,475	1,333,913	1,276,519	1,303,698	1,283,282	1,246,389	1,320,437	1,305,333	1,352,230	14,987,931
2019	1,352,917	956,165	981,233	1,303,153	1,334,182	1,272,540	1,300,484	1,284,026	1,264,678	1,312,355	1,302,614	1,348,575	15,012,922
2020	1,349,218	939,661	1,058,722	1,298,643	1,339,557	1,278,643	1,299,341	1,289,513	1,262,085	1,323,210	1,295,674	1,346,290	15,080,557
2021	1,350,621	1,163,666	832,885	1,297,994	1,337,931	1,278,215	1,263,359	1,288,572	1,253,272	1,320,373	1,259,115	1,347,630	14,993,633
2022	1,281,507	723,066	1,295,799	1,289,866	1,331,688	1,266,856	1,285,312	1,268,268	1,111,644	1,325,007	1,288,533	1,343,138	15,833,684
2023	1,344,780	996,006	1,070,742	1,293,357	1,326,605	1,272,752	1,289,010	1,281,383	1,237,467	1,311,938	1,215,009	1,344,702	15,901,751
2024	1,325,128	726,054	1,237,792	1,333,089	1,329,101	1,266,860	1,147,305	1,280,085	1,255,082	1,241,487	1,283,794	1,341,211	14,766,988
2025	1,344,871	1,101,327	730,605	1,293,757	1,344,871	1,239,502	1,262,630	1,282,038	1,254,782	1,309,966	1,286,099	1,344,702	14,795,150
2026	1,347,000	923,274	1,014,328	1,295,654	1,332,766	1,273,065	1,285,831	1,267,767					--

== Surrounding population ==
The Nuclear Regulatory Commission (NRC) defines two emergency planning zones around nuclear power plants: a plume exposure pathway zone with a radius of 10 miles (16 km), concerned primarily with exposure to, and inhalation of, airborne radioactive contamination, and an ingestion pathway zone of about 50 miles (80 km), concerned primarily with ingestion of food and liquid contaminated by radioactivity.

The 2010 US population within 10 miles (16 km) of Calvert Cliffs was 48,798, an increase of 86.4 percent in a decade, according to an analysis of U.S. Census data for msnbc.com. The 2010 U.S. population within 50 miles (80 km) was 2,890,702, a decrease of 2.0 percent since 2000. Cities within 50 miles include Washington, D.C., (45 miles to city center).

== Risks and concerns ==
=== Proximity to LNG plant ===
In 2001, when the Dominion Cove Point LNG plant was scheduled to reopen, many local residents were concerned about the proximity to this nuclear power plant (3 miles (4.8 km)). Residents thought that the Federal Energy Regulatory Commission did not consider the risks could be caused by an attack or an explosion before opening the plant.

=== Seismic risk ===
The NRC's estimate of the risk each year of an earthquake intense enough to cause core damage to the reactor at Calvert Cliffs was 1 in 100,000 for Reactor 1 and 1 in 83,333 for Reactor 2, according to an NRC study published in August 2010.

=== Environmental concerns ===
In the 1960s scientists at Johns Hopkins University became concerned that the discharge of heated cooling water from the plant would be detrimental to a crucial element of the Chesapeake Bay ecosystem, the bay's famed blue crabs. Litigation pursuant to the 1970 National Environmental Policy Act led to a 1971 decision by the U.S. Court of Appeals for the D.C. Circuit requiring the Atomic Energy Commission (succeeded by the NRC in 1974) to consider the environmental impact of building and maintaining such an atomic energy plant.

== 2000 renewal of operating license ==
In 2000, the NRC extended the license of the plant for 20 additional years, making Calvert Cliffs the first nuclear plant in the United States to receive such an extension. President George W. Bush visited the plant in June 2005, the first time a president had visited a nuclear power plant in nearly two decades.

== Proposal to add a third reactor ==
UniStar Nuclear Energy announced plans to build a unit of the Evolutionary Power Reactor (US-EPR variant) at Calvert Cliffs. UniStar Nuclear Energy, a Delaware limited liability company, was jointly owned by Constellation Energy (CEG) and Électricité de France (EDF), the French builder and supplier of nuclear power plants. The proposed unit was to produce approximately twice the energy of each individual existing unit. On July 13, 2007, UniStar Nuclear Energy filed a partial application to the Nuclear Regulatory Commission to review its plans to build a new nuclear power plant, Calvert Cliffs Nuclear Power Plant 3 (CCNPP 3) based on the AREVA US Evolutionary Power Reactor (US-EPR), Generation III+, four loop pressurized water reactor.

The third reactor was intended to address a need for more baseload power generation in the Mid-Atlantic region. The unit proposed to be located south of the existing units 1 and 2, set back from the shoreline. Although only a single unit, its power plant footprint was almost twice the size of the existing units together. It was to have a closed-loop cooling system using a single hybrid mechanical draft cooling tower, incorporating plume abatement for no visible water vapor plume from the tower. Units 1 and 2 use an open-cycle heat dissipation system without cooling towers. The cooling tower of the Unit 3 reactor was to release two thirds of its waste heat to the atmosphere. The proposed EPR design was a saturated steam plant with one high-pressure turbine in tandem with three low-pressure turbines and a main generator design similar to Unit 1 and 2. Alstom was to supply the main steam turbine and main generator.

On November 13, 2007, UniStar Nuclear Energy filed an application for a certificate of public convenience and necessity with the Maryland Public Service Commission for authority to construct CCNPP 3. This application is being considered in Case Number 9127.

Opponents and supporters of the proposed third reactor at Calvert Cliffs were involved in a series of public hearings before officials of the US Nuclear Regulatory Commission. In March 2009, Bill Peil of southern Calvert County asked the NRC to deny an emissions permit for the reactor due to health and safety concerns he asserted that the plant posed to the community. UniStar Nuclear Energy President and CEO George Vanderheyden urged the NRC to approve the air permit application.

In October 2010, Constellation Energy said that it had reached an impasse in negotiations for a federal loan guarantee to build the proposed third reactor. The government sought a fee of $880 million on a guarantee of about $7.6 billion, to compensate taxpayers for the risk of default. Constellation Energy replied that such a fee would doom the project, “or the economics of any nuclear project, for that matter”.

In November 2010 a deal to transfer Constellation Energy Group's stake in a nuclear development company to its French partner, EDF Group, closed, according to the U.S. Securities and Exchange Commission. A month prior, Constellation agreed to sell its 50 percent stake in UniStar Nuclear Energy to EDF for US$140 million, giving EDF sole ownership of the joint venture and its plans to develop a third unit at Calvert Cliffs in Southern Maryland. The deal called for EDF to transfer 3.5 million shares it owns, valued around US$110 million, to Constellation and give up its seat on the Constellation board. EDF designee Samuel Minzberg resigned.

In April 2011 the NRC stated that UniStar is not eligible to build a third reactor, as it is not a US owned company since Constellation pulled out of the partnership in 2010. The NRC would continue to process the application, but a license would not be issued until the ownership requirements were met. The reactor was estimated to cost $9.6 billion.

Constellation Energy merged into Exelon in 2012.

In 2015 Areva, struggling with internal restructuring of its corporation, withdrew from the certification process for the US EPR reactor design, effectively putting on hold plans for the deployment of a European reactor in the US.

== Incidents ==
Unit 2 at the Calvert Cliffs nuclear power plant was shut down on September 5, 2013, after a malfunction during testing. It was re-opened September 10, 2013, after the required maintenance was performed.

A long-track, devastating EF4 tornado would nearly hit the power plant in April of 2002 after striking La Plata. The tornado would leave three dead in Charles and Calvert counties.

== Reactor data ==
The Calvert Cliffs Nuclear Power Plant consist of two operational reactors, one additional was proposed in 2007 and withdrawn.

Reactor unit	Reactor type	Capacity(MW)		Construction started	Electricity grid connection	Commercial operation	Shutdown
Reactor unit	Reactor type	Net	Gross	Construction started	Electricity grid connection	Commercial operation	Shutdown
Calvert Cliffs-1	CE 2-loop	855	918	01/06/1968	03/01/1975	08/05/1975	
Calvert Cliffs-2	CE 2-loop	850	911	01/06/1968	07/12/1976	01/04/1977	
Calvert Cliffs-3 (canceled)	US-EPR	1600	?				

== See also ==
- List of power stations in Maryland
