= Indian Head Rail Trail =

Rail trail in Southern Maryland

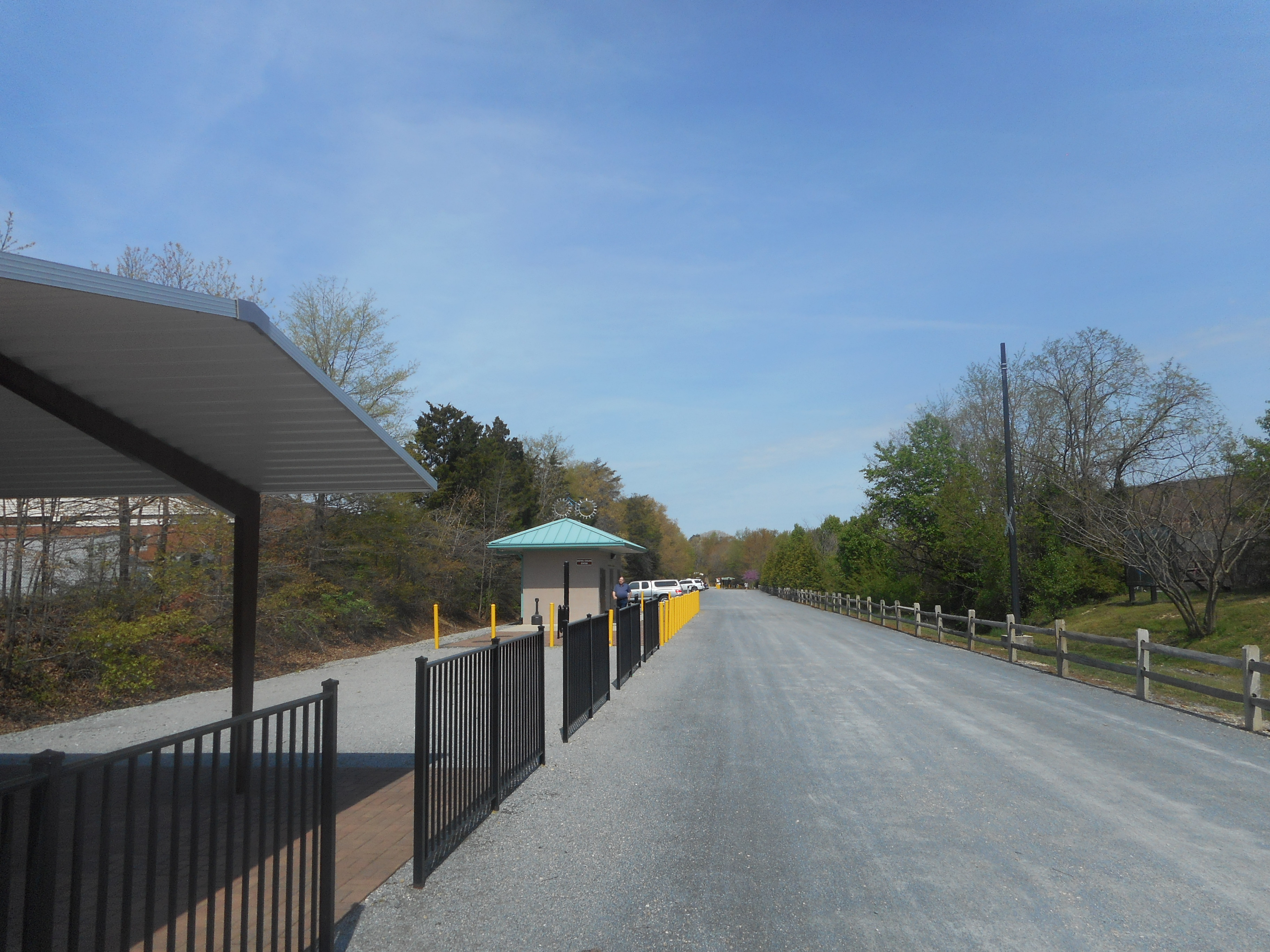
- Looking west from the White Plains Trail Head of the Indian Head Rail Trail in White Plains, Maryland.
- Length: 13.1 miles (21.1 km)
- Location: Charles County, Maryland
- Established: 2008
- Trailheads: Indian Head, Maryland - Mattingly Road and Livingston Road, White Plains, Maryland - Middletown Road and Theodore Green Blvd.
- Use: Hiking, Biking
- Surface: Asphalt
- Website: destinationsouthernmaryland.com/places/indian-head-rail-trail/

The Indian Head Rail Trail is a 13.1-mile (21.1 km), shared-use rail trail that runs from Indian Head, Maryland, to White Plains, Maryland. It was built on the abandoned right-of-way of the old Cape Charles Railroad, a subsidiary of the New York, Philadelphia and Norfolk Railroad (NYP&N), which ran from 1910 to 1972. Planned phases would extend the trail all the way to Cape Charles.

== History ==
The U.S. Navy built the Indian Head Branch to the Naval Powder Factory at Indian Head in 1918-19 as part of the buildup during World War I. It was built off the Pope's Creek Subdivision from a junction at White Plains, Maryland to aid in the production of smokeless powder (a propellant used in firearms and artillery). The road was opened on Armistice Day - May 29, 1919 - but was not completed for actual service for several months. It continued to provide an important link for the production of powder during World War II. The Navy also used it to bring coal, supplies and other materials to Indian Head until the early 1970's after which it fell into disuse with it last being used in the late 1980's. In 1998, the Navy advertised for businesses interested in running a dinner train on the underused line and in 1999 they selected one. It ran few trains, derailed often and, after several violations, the Navy cancelled the lease.

With the failure of the tourist train, the Indian Head Naval Surface Warfare Center briefly considered using the line to have coal delivered to the base, but found the investment required for repairs was too great, so in 2003 they announced plans to donate the railroad line to Charles County for the creation of a trail. In 2005 the Navy declared the line west of Mattingly Avenue in Indian Head and several rail cars left behind by the tourist railroad excess. The 13.4 mile long, 160-acre corridor and the rail cars then became the property of the Department of the Interior and in 2006 it was donated to Charles County as part of the Federal Lands-to-Parks program.

The trail project was briefly held up when, in 2007, Alcoa considered building a 950-megawatt coal-fired plant on the Navy base and using the rail line to deliver coal to it. In September 2007 Alcoa decided that if they built the plant they would not need the rails. In 2008, Charles County's Department of Public Facilities removed the rails and ties and sold them, it used the revenue from the sale to help pay for the trail that it built. They completed a two-mile long segment in White Plains and a 2.7-mile segment in Indian Head in December of 2008. The second section of the trail, paid for with $250,000 of Charles County money, opened in June 2009 and the trail was completed later that year. A bathroom facility and two water fountains were completed in 2010.

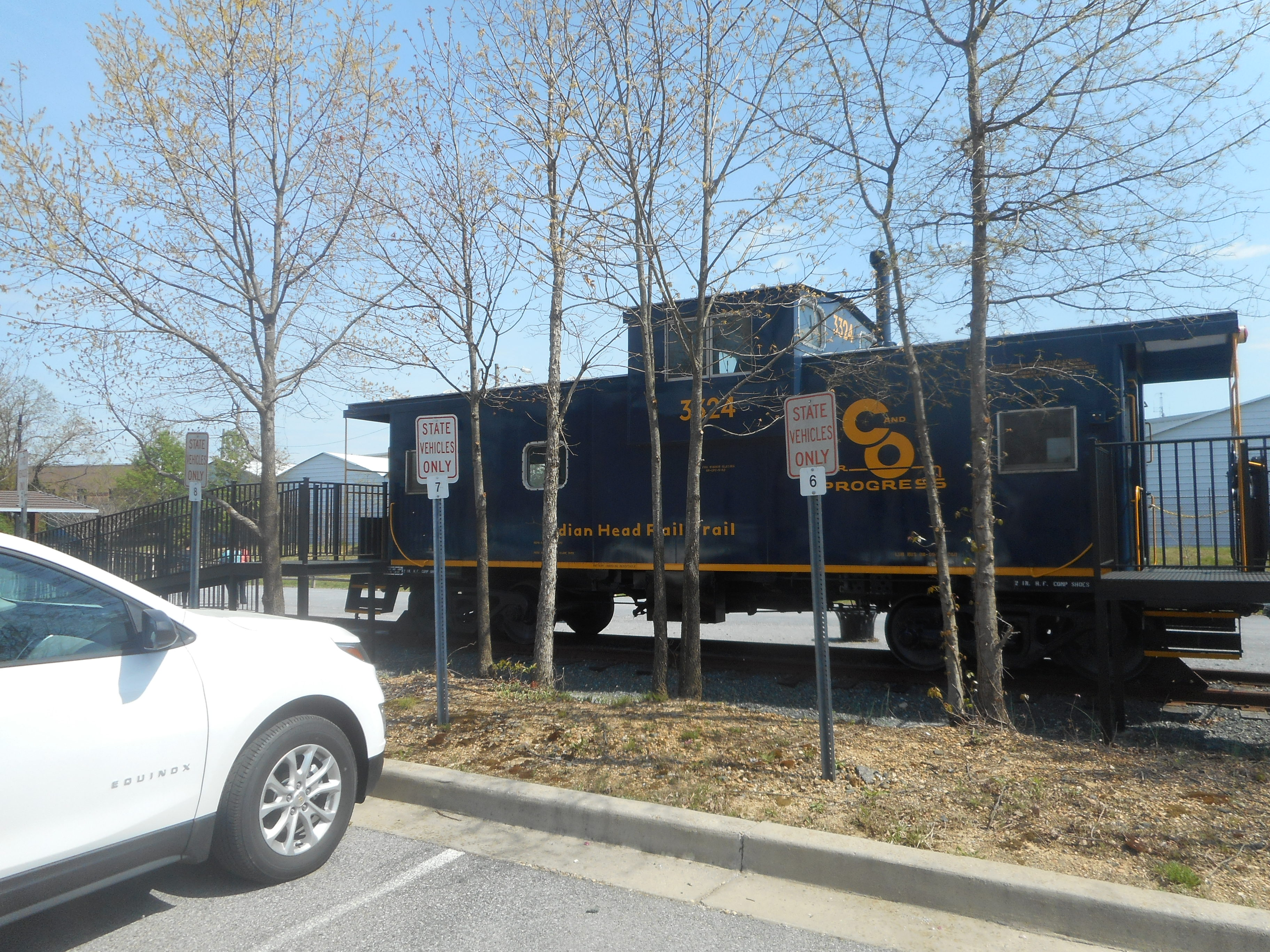
C&O Caboose No. 3324 at the trailhead

In 2011, Charles County authorized the purchase of a caboose to place at the trailhead. It was restored by the B&O Museum and delivered in 2012 and opened to the public in April 2013.

In 2022, Charles County studied an "expansion" of the trail to connect it to the Three Notch Trail in Hughesville.

== Trail route ==
The 13.1-mile paved rail trail travels halfway across Charles County from the town of Indian Head on the Potomac River, just outside the gates of the Naval Surface Warfare Center, to the inland community of White Plains. The trail passes the wetlands of Mattawoman Creek, Old Woman Run and Tobacco Creek, and through three wildlife management and environmental areas. It follows flat terrain, on a straight course to White Plains on a 10-foot-wide paved path with grassy shoulders bordered by forests and farmland.
