= Chesapeake Beach Railway =

US railroad of Maryland and Washington, D.C.

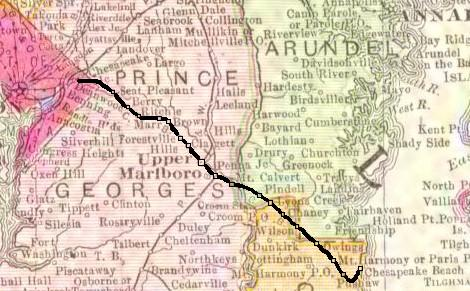
- Map of the Chesapeake Beach Railway in 1913

Overview
- Headquarters: Denver, Colorado
- Locale: Washington, D.C., to Chesapeake Beach, Maryland
- Dates of operation: December 5, 1898–April 15, 1935

Technical
- Track gauge: 4 ft 8 1/2 in (1,435 mm) standard gauge

The Chesapeake Beach Railway (CBR), now defunct, was an American railroad of southern Maryland and Washington, D.C., built in the 19th century. The CBR ran 27.629 miles from Washington, D.C., on tracks laid by the Southern Maryland Railroad and its own single track through Maryland farm country to a resort at Chesapeake Beach. The construction of the railway was overseen by Otto Mears, a Colorado railroad builder, who planned a shoreline resort with railroad service from Washington and Baltimore. It served Washington and Chesapeake Beach for almost 35 years, but closed amid the Great Depression and the rise of the automobile. The last train left the station on April 15, 1935. Parts of the right-of-way are now used for roads and a future rail trail.

== History ==
=== Origins ===
In 1891, Baltimore lawyer (and later Maryland governor) Edwin Warfield and others organized the Washington & Chesapeake Beach Railway to connect Washington, D.C., with 3,000 acres (12 km^{2}) of virgin bay front property at Fishing Creek where they would build a resort. Their Chesapeake Beach, Maryland, resort was to be a vacation spot for the rich and middle class alike, with two grand hotels, a boardwalk, racetrack, and amusements. A pier would accommodate Chesapeake Bay excursion steamers from Baltimore, Annapolis, and Eastern Shore points. In 1894, the W&CBR was granted a charter to incorporate the Town of Chesapeake Beach. Its grand schemes never bore fruit, and the railway was placed in receivership in 1895.

A new company, the Chesapeake Beach Railway Company, took up the idea in 1896. In 1897, Otto Mears was placed in control of the company. He started construction in October 1897 at the B&O Railroad's Alexandria branch north of present-day Deane Avenue between Benning and Kenilworth. On April 7, 1898, the Chesapeake Beach Railway was given the franchise of the W&CBR. Mears optimistically anticipated that the railroad would be completed by July 1898—though before it could open, a draw span bridge would have to be built over the Patuxent River below Bristol to permit steamboat traffic. Plans were approved by the U.S. Army Corps of Engineers, a contract to construct the bridge was awarded to the Youngstown Bridge Company, and, after numerous delays, the bridge was open by May 1899. Like much of the rail infrastructure throughout the United States, the CBR was built and maintained predominantly by African-American workers. The CBR was segregated by race, with separate waiting rooms and rail cars for African-Americans.

The CBR entered into successful agreements with the B&O to extend service from their Hyattsville station on the Washington Branch and then along the Alexandria Branch for four miles to Chesapeake Junction, located in today's Deanwood neighborhood where current-day Minnesota Avenue NE and Nannie Helen Burroughs Avenue NE. On December 5, 1898, the line from Hyattsville to Upper Marlboro was officially opened. Their primary goal was to tap into the Baltimore market by connecting directly with the Baltimore-Washington trains that stopped at Hyattsville. As part of the contract, B&O built a separate siding in front of its Hyattsville station for CB trains to lay over. Most of the time, they ran two round trips a day. By 1899, the line was completed all the way to Chesapeake Beach; the first excursion train ran on July 31, 1899. The hotel was not ready, so normal operations on the eastern leg of the railroad began on June 9, 1900.

In April 1900, the Washington Traction & Electric Company extended the old Columbia H Street car line to Seat Pleasant, connecting with the Chesapeake Beach at the extreme eastern corner of the District. It became the main way Washington passengers reached the beach trains.

When the Benning Road Power Plant was opened in 1906, a three-block section of the railway became a critical part of the freight route for coal heading to the plant. Cars were moved on CBR tracks from the junction with the B&O to a connection with Washington Railway and Electric Company tracks three blocks away.

=== Operations ===
In the early years, trains left Hyattsville and used B&O tracks to Chesapeake Junction. Then it traveled out of the District on the once-abandoned right-of-way of the Southern Maryland Railroad. It exited D.C. at Seat Pleasant, where it met with the Washington, Baltimore and Annapolis Electric Railway at a stop called District Line. From there, it went through Upper Marlboro, passing over the PRR (Pope Creek Branch), and then on to Chesapeake Beach.

On July 7, 1913 their agreement to use B&O tracks ended and afterwards all CB passenger trains ended their runs at the Seat Pleasant trolley terminal called "District Line." Chesapeake Junction remained the railroad's primary freight interchange, but the railroad's rural territory produced little freight. The junction grew steadily more important after the building of the Benning power plant in 1906.

Coal destined for the Benning power plant was at first moved into the plant by electric locomotives operating over the tracks of WREC and its successor, Capital Transit. They transferred from the B&O on about three blocks of the CBR tracks from Chesapeake Junction to the connection to the streetcar and then along the streetcar line past Kenilworth Junction to the plant. The plant was the central power facility for the onetime Washington Railway & Electric Company, the largest of the city's two street railway companies. Later it was inherited by Potomac Electric Power Company and progressively expanded over the years as the city's major generating plant. The streetcar company handled all plant switching and interchange with its own electric locomotives. To avoid the necessity for the CB to switch the cars over the three block stretch between B & O and the trolley interchange, CBR made an agreement in 1919 to allow B & O locomotives to use their track, paying CBR a per-car charge. So the whole operation was carried out on the track of three companies using B&O and then streetcar locomotives.

In the early years, the fare for the round trip train ride from District Line station to Chesapeake Beach was 50 cents (approximately equivalent to $15 in 2017). Express trains took about 60 minutes to make the trip; “locals” took about 90 minutes.

=== Southern Maryland Railroad section ===
In 1884, the Southern Maryland Railroad (SMR) began constructing a rail line from Deanwood towards the District line which it eventually planned to connect to Brandywine and the rest of its rail line. They laid out the right-of-way and graded the line, laying down ties and rail by 1886. In 1898, the CBR took possession of this section of railway, presumably via a tax auction and used it for its operation. When the SMR emerged from bankruptcy in 1901 as the Washington, Potomac & Chesapeake Railway (WP&CR) it sued the CBR in 1902, claiming they still owned the railbed. The case went to the Supreme Court and in 1905 WP&CR won and took title to the railway. The Chesapeake Beach stopped running on the DC section of the railway, instead stopping at the train station in Seat Pleasant called District Line. Passengers would get there by using the Columbia Railway's street car line from Navy Yard. In 1911, they started leasing the District section of the line and continued until the WP&CR went out of business in 1918. At that point they purchased the section.

=== End of the line ===
The railroad was never financially successful and never paid off any interest on its original one million dollar mortgage. Starting in 1921, when the railroad carried a peak of 352,000 passengers, the increased use of automobiles began to cut into revenue. The destruction of the luxurious Belvedere Hotel by a fire which originally started at Klein's Bakery two blocks away on March 30, 1923, further limited business. In 1929, under new management, an attempt to rehabilitate the line was made and operations continued with the hope that a new ferry across the Chesapeake Bay to a point on Trippe's Bay in Dorchester County would drive new business. The ferry was blocked by the Claiborne-Annapolis Ferry Company, a competing ferry out of Annapolis. A hurricane in 1933 irreparably damaged the resort's facilities, and the subsequent loss of business led to foreclosure and a request for abandonment in 1935. On April 15, 1935, after entering receivership, the last train left Chesapeake Beach. All but the 2.631 miles from the roundhouse at "Maryland Park" to the junction at Deanwood, which confusingly took on the name of "Chesapeake Junction" in later years, and the 0.756 mile spur from Chesapeake junction to the PEPCO plant was abandoned, as that section had significant freight business. The remaining section was bought that same year by the East Washington Railway, formed specifically for that purpose, and the rail east of Maryland Park was removed in the summer of 1935 and the best of it sold to plantation railroads in Cuba. Most of the cars were burned and the metal sold for scrap, except for two that were transferred to the East Washington—the Dolores and San Juan—and a mail car. Two of the three remaining engines were transferred to the East Washington as well.

=== East Washington Railway ===
The 3.4 mile long East Washington Railway survived for 40 years after the Chesapeake Beach Railway stopped running in 1935. Its main customers were a liquor wholesaler, a cement company, a bakery and PEPCO, the local power company. PEPCO needed coal delivered to its Benning Road Plant from Chesapeake Junction, the interchange with the Baltimore and Ohio Railroad. During the late 1930s and early 1940s operations changed with EWR's two secondhand 4-4-0 locomotives switching the hoppers the three blocks between the B&O and Capital Transit. In 1946 East Washington dieselized, first with a GE 45-ton centercab locomotive, then an ex-U.S. Army 65-ton Whitcomb and finally a former Washington Terminal Alco RS-1. The Seat Pleasant streetcar line was abandoned in 1949, but Capital Transit continued to operate the line to the Benning plant until January 1955 when it sold the section to the East Washington.

When Kenilworth Avenue was converted into a limited-access highway, PEPCO sought permission to build a railroad bridge over it to ensure coal deliveries from the Pennsylvania Railroad, a move Capitol Transit and the East Washington—which delivered coal from the B&O—opposed, but the bridge was built anyway. At the time, the Highway Department wanted Capitol Transit to abandon the line, since the new bridge would provide a more direct service and at great cost to the District and the three rail companies (B&O, Capital Transit and EWR) the rail spur was moved and accommodated.

In 1975 the power plant converted to oil to meet District environmental regulations which resulted in the demise of the East Washington Railway as PEPCO accounted for 97% of their revenue. The last coal train down the PEPCO spur ran on August 18, 1975. In 1978, the railroad, which by then was down to four employees from 10, and a single Whitcomb ceased operations after successfully overcoming a protest of their abandonment by a liquor warehouse owner.

The same year they ceased operations, the tracks were sold to Maryland Midland Railway which pulled them up and sold most of the rail and some of the ties. The remainder were kept in storage by the Maryland Midland. The District of Columbia had considered, in their 1976 bicycle plan, using the railroad right-of-way as a bicycle trail but the opposition of local residents who wanted single-family housing on the strip, budget constraints and the presence of an alternative option along Watts Branch led them to forego that plan. In 1979, planning began to construct 31 detached homes on the portion of right-of-way between 43rd Place and Division Avenue, NE. In 1982, as part of the reconstruction of the westbound Benning Road viaduct, most of the Benning Road Power Plant spur from N.H. Burroughs Avenue to Foote Street NE was removed. The only remaining section of rail is buried beneath Foote Street.

A one-block long section of the right-of-way in Seat Pleasant was turned into a section of the Chesapeake Beach Rail Trail in 2011.

The railway's DC railyard, located north of Sheriff Avenue along the CSX tracks, has been used for parking and for an auto repair facility, but in 2017 work began to convert the property into a major firehouse, EMS and storage facility to replace the one at 4201 Minnesota Avenue.

==== Surviving EW locomotives ====
All of the diesel locomotives operated by the East Washington Railway survived for many years after the railway itself was abandoned.

No. 101, a GE 45-ton centercab, was built in 1946 and purchased by the EW in September of that year. It was retired in 1970 and sold to the Pinto Islands Metals Company in Mobile, Alabama, and for decades has been the plant switcher at the James River Cogeneration Company in Hopewell, VA. The plant was retired in 2019. Following the plant's closing, it was acquired by the Richmond Railroad Museum in Richmond, Virginia. The locomotive itself was transported from the plant to the museum's satellite yard in Hallsboro, Virginia.

No. 102, a Whitcomb 65-ton centercab, was built in July 1944 as U.S. Army 8465. Following the demise of the East Washington Railway it was acquired as the first motive power for the new Maryland Midland Railway. After a career working as a quarry switcher in Ohio, it was acquired by the Hocking Valley Scenic Railway, a tourist line in Ohio.

No. 103, an Alco RS-1, was built in 1944 for the Washington Terminal Company in Washington, D.C. It was purchased by the East Washington Railway in April 1968 and sold to Union Equity Grain in Pasadena, Texas, in January 1970. Later acquired by an individual owner, it was stored in Texas until it was damaged in a collision and subsequently scrapped in 2013.

== Stations on the line ==
- Chesapeake Junction
- District Line
- Seat Pleasant
- Berry
- Ritchie
- Marr
- Brown
- Forestville Hills
- Claggett
- Upper Marlboro
- Pennsylvania Junction
- Mt. Calvert
- Pindell
- Lyons Creek
- Chaney
- Wilson
- Owings
- Mt. Harmony
- Pushaw
- Chesapeake Beach

== Surviving landmarks ==
- The Chesapeake Beach Railway Station on Mears Avenue has served as the Chesapeake Beach Railway Museum since 1979.
- East Chesapeake Beach Road (Maryland Route 260) uses the right-of-way
- The base of the Lyons Creek trestle is still visible from the Rt 260 exit ramp off of MD Route 4
- The Railroad Bed and Upper Railroad Bed hiking trails and River Farm entrance road, all at Jug Bay Wetlands Sanctuary follow the right-of-way with old culverts, "clinkers" (burned coal), and clear evidence of the old railroad ties.
- The base of the swing bridge over the Patuxent River at Jug Bay Wetlands Sanctuary as well as the fill for the railroad bed on the both sides of the river
- The right-of-way can be hiked at Mt. Calvert to Charles Branch
- The right-of-way is used for a few sections of the Chesapeake Beach Rail Trail and other sections are still extant such as a large section in the Randolph Village area and the median of Hayes Street NE in Washington, DC.
- The western section of Nannie Helen Burroughs Avenue NE in Washington, D.C., is on the right-of-way.
- A passenger car, named the Dolores, at the Chesapeake Beach Railway Museum. The museum was going to buy another car, the San Juan which had served as the company President's car and then, with the Dolores, as a home for East Washington Railway employees, but it was destroyed by fire the night before it was to be brought to the museum. Both cars were found at the company's old rail yard in Seat Pleasant in 1979.

== Destroyed landmarks ==
- The District Line station, which became the headquarters of the East Washington Railway and was then called the Seat Pleasant station, was torn down in the late 1940s to make room for an office and store room.
- In 1962, the station in Upper Marlboro, which was still abandoned, was destroyed in a fire.
- In the 1990s, the Pindell station collapsed and only ruins remain; the old caretaker's house nearby remains standing and was acquired as part of Jug Bay Wetlands Sanctuary in 2004.
- In 1983, the Chesapeake Beach Railway's C-shaped roundhouse and turntable in Seat Pleasant, built in 1901-02, were demolished to make room for the Addison Plaza Shopping Center on Central Avenue. At the time it was one of only two remaining buildings from the old Chesapeake Beach Railway, and only one of eight remaining roundhouses on the east coast, but was deemed not historic.
