= Chesapeake Beach Rail Trail =

Set of trails in Maryland and the District of Columbia

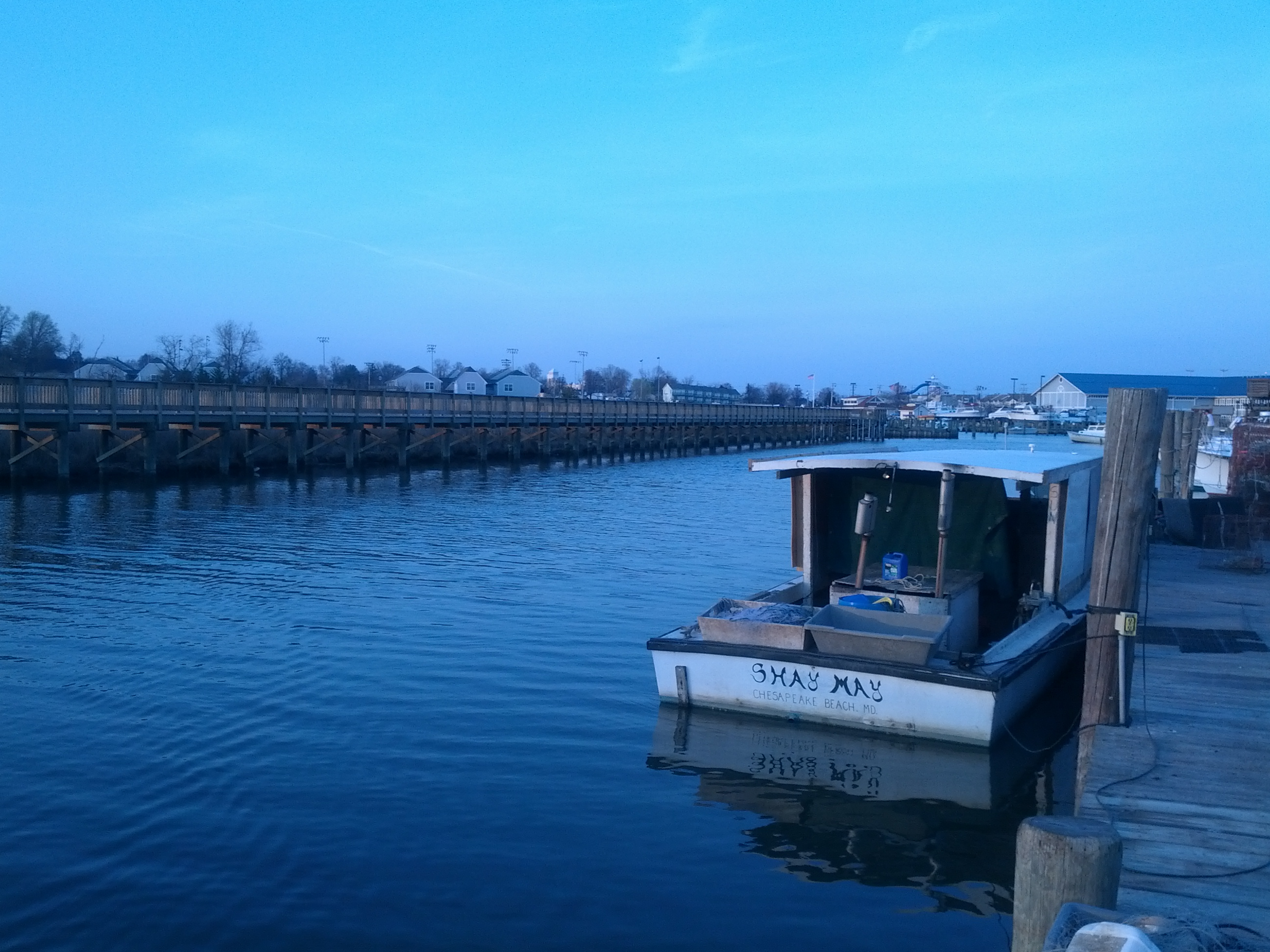
The trail along Fishing Creek (near Chesapeake Beach terminus) is a boardwalk, resting on piles 2 metres above the water.

The Chesapeake Beach Rail Trail (sometimes referred to as the Chesapeake Beach Railway Trail) is a set of short trails along the original Chesapeake Beach Railway route from Washington, D.C. to Chesapeake Beach, Maryland. The Maryland-National Capital Park and Planning Commission (M-NCPPC) acquired portions of the corridor through the subdivision process. Some sections have already been built. Plans call for future sections to be built as available until this corridor serves as the spine for a number of greenway branches.

When developed, the trail will be owned, managed, and maintained by M-NCPPC. It will cross three counties in Southern Maryland, with 28 miles (45 km) of greenway corridor through Calvert and Anne Arundel counties, and 11 miles through Prince George's County.

== Development ==
Calvert County acquired a 100-acre (0.40 km^{2}) tract adjacent to Fishing Creek and the town of Chesapeake Beach which contains 1,800 feet (550 m) of the railroad right-of-way. This property, renamed Fishing Creek Park, is adjacent to the terminus of the trail at Chesapeake Railroad Museum. A trail was developed on this portion of the right-of-way with a connection to residential communities within the vicinity, providing off-road access to the towns of Chesapeake Beach and North Beach and their in-town boardwalks and trails. In September 2004, the state of Maryland committed $1.6 million for construction of the first 1.4 miles (2.3 km) of trail to begin in the fall of 2005. This was pushed back to 2008 and the work was completed in 2011, with a dedication on September 30, 2011.

In Anne Arundel County part of the railbed in Jug Bay Wetlands Sanctuary is used for a pair of natural surface trails, the Railroad Bed Trail and the Upper Railroad Bed Trail. These stretch over a mile from the Patuxent River to River Farm Road, which is built on the ROW. The future trail would connect these trails with the town of Chesapeake Beach and Upper Marlboro.

In Prince George's County, a 100-foot (30 m) long portion was built in Maryland Park between Crown Street and the Addison Plaza shopping center. Sidewalks along Ritchie Marlboro Road serve as the trail in the area near the Beltway.

In 2023, Prince George's County planning department started working on a feasibility and design study for a segment of the planned hard-surface Chesapeake Beach Rail Trail between MD 725 (Marlboro Pike) and the Prince George's County Equestrian Center in Upper Marlboro, MD.
