= Washington, Brandywine and Point Lookout Railroad =

Washington, Brandywine & Point Lookout Railroad
- An 1881 map shows the planned Southern Maryland Railroad, which would become the Washington, Brandywine & Point Lookout Railroad

Overview
- Locale: Washington, D.C., to Seat Pleasant, Maryland, and Brandywine, Maryland, to Cedar Point, Maryland
- Dates of operation: 1883–1965
- Predecessors: Southern Maryland Railroad, Washington & Potomac Railroad
- Successor: U.S. Naval Air Station Railroad, Herbert Subdivision

Technical
- Track gauge: 4 ft 8 1/2 in (1,435 mm) standard gauge

The Washington, Brandywine & Point Lookout Railroad (WB&PL) (originally, the Southern Maryland Railroad) was an American railroad that operated in southern Maryland and Washington, D.C., from 1918 to 1942. It and other, shorter-lived entities used the right-of-way from 1883 to 1965. The single-track line connected Mechanicsville, Maryland, to the Pennsylvania Railroad in Brandywine. Most of the rail was constructed by the Southern Maryland Railroad, which also built a section of track in East Washington that was intended to connect with this line but never did. The WB&PL was later acquired by the Navy, which extended the line to Cedar Point and the Patuxent Naval Air Station. In 1962, the Pennsylvania Railroad constructed a spur from Hughesville, Maryland to the Chalk Point Generating Station. During the 1960s and 1970s, the section from Hughesville to Cedar Point was abandoned and removed, and this area has since been repurposed for a highway, roads, a utility corridor, and a bike trail. The section from Brandywine to Hughesville, extending to Chalk Point, remains in use, though infrequently, as the plant ceased using coal in 2022.

== History ==
=== Southern Maryland Railroad ===
Planning for a railroad to Point Lookout started in 1866.

The Southern Maryland Railroad (SMR) was incorporated on March 20, 1868, “for the purpose of constructing, maintaining, and working a railroad from some point in Prince George’s County to Point Lookout.” The planned right-of-way ran along the peninsula created by two rivers: the Potomac and Patuxent. The company's founders hoped that a rail line from the major north-south Potomac River crossings into Virginia near Washington, D.C., to a port on the Patuxent River near the Chesapeake Bay would spur agricultural and mineral businesses on the peninsula.

The company quickly set its sights on running into Washington, D.C.

In 1872, the Baltimore and Potomac Railroad (B&P) began work on its mainline to Pope's Creek and this motivated work on grading the rail which started in the spring of that year. Prior to that only work being done was surveying and fund-raising. That same year a competitor railroad, the Washington City and Point Lookout Railroad was incorporated and the following year authorized to run trains between Washington, D.C., and Point Lookout with connecting steamers to Norfolk, Virginia. It would be a thorn in the SMR's side though the only rail it would build was the Alexandria Extension. By mid-1873, the SMR had built 30 miles of roadbed from the B&P at Brandywine to St. Joseph's Church in Morganza and 12 miles north from Point Lookout. Work was delayed by the Panic of 1873. SMR officials frequently promised to complete the work, but had laid down no rails or ties when it was forced into receivership in 1875. In 1876, the SMR was investigated for defrauding the state of Maryland, the sole shareholder in the company.

In 1874, the U.S. Naval Board reported that Point Lookout, with its key location and deep water, would be a good location for a coaling station. The Navy also thought that the railroad, paired with a steamer, could cut the travel time between Washington and Norfolk by six hours. The Navy thus supported a bill that would guarantee the SMR a payment if they completed the railroad, but it never passed. Nonetheless the promise of a guaranteed customer if the line could be completed drew the frequent attention of other railroaders.

In 1878, the WC&PL was authorized to purchase the SMR but never did.

In March 1881, the railroad began to lay track from Brandywine where it would connect with the Baltimore and Potomac Railroad (later the Pope's Creek branch of the Pennsylvania Railroad). The WC&PL also broke ground on its rail line to Point Lookout in 1881 and, like the SMR, it started at a connection with the Baltimore and Potomac at Brandywine. The two started work at almost the exact same time and their two roads were no more than 100 feet apart. At this point both companies had graded separated routes from Point Lookout to California, MD; but only the SMR had graded the road from California to Brandywine and so they were laying track faster. When it came time for the WC&PL to issue more bonds to continue the work, a rumor that the SMR had secured a larger loan than the WC&PL scared off the WC&PL's English investors. The WC&PL formed an alliance with the B&O, but their plans were scuttled by company President John W. Garrett. Years later when it became clear that the endeavor was hopeless the rails and ties, which had sat in piles in Brandywine, were reallocated to the building of the Chesapeake Beach Railway.

Over the next couple of years the SMR graded the railroad all the way to Esperanza (located on the Patuxent just downstream from the current Governor Thomas Johnson Bridge) and laid track to Mechanicsville. Trains began running between Brandywine and Mechanicsville in 1883. At that time the railroad was still planning to build a line from Benning to Brandywine, to extend the line to Point Lookout and to build a spur off the mainline to Esperanza just across from Solomon's Island.

In 1882, the Southern was finally granted permission to enter the District of Columbia. Work began on grading that 2.2 mile rail line from Benning via Deanwood in 1884 and some track was laid by 1885. By 1886, the railroad had laid down ties and some rail in D.C., but it never operated trains on this section, which later came under control of the Chesapeake Beach Railway.

In 1885, having spent extensive money on construction but putting into operations only the lightly used line between Brandywine and Mechanicsville, the railroad went into default and in 1886 it was forcibly sold for $75,000 to a syndicate of Boston investors, who reincorporated it as the Washington & Potomac Railroad Company.

=== Washington & Potomac Railroad ===
The Southern Maryland Railroad was eventually sold to a new company called the Washington & Potomac Railroad (W&P) on April 1, 1886, and trains continued to run until the end of 1889 when a fire destroyed the roundhouse, engines and rolling stock. A lawyer from New York, working with the WC&PL, received permission from the underlying land owners to build another line on the same route and began running trains on the repaired W&P tracks but was stopped by an injunction brought by the legal owners of the W&P. After a lengthy 1892 court case, the WC&PL lost and was placed into receivership under control of the W&P. The WC&PL was sold at public auction in 1895 for $2500.

The WC&PL continued as an entity, owning land in the District of Columbia as late as 1935, but it was done running trains or building rail.

The W&P was unable to expand the rail line in any direction due to lack of funding and a constant need to extend the deadline to complete the road to Point Lookout. Competing railroads, like the Washington and Seaboard Railroad which was chartered in 1898 to build a line from Hyattsville to Point Lookout, fought efforts to get extensions and tried to undermine funding. After their attempt to get an extension on the deadline was killed by the Maryland House in March of 1900, the Union Trust Company foreclosed on the railroad, it was put in receivership and then forcibly auctioned off on the steps of courthouse in Upper Marlboro in July for $100,000.

=== Washington, Potomac & Chesapeake Railway ===
After the Washington and Potomac was sold, there were many people interested in acquiring its assets and trying to connect it to Point Lookout and its strategic location and deep water, included a group headed by John Prentiss Poe and John's sons Edgar A. Poe and Johnny Poe. But the group that secured the company in 1901, composed of Philadelphia capitalists called their corporation the Washington, Potomac & Chesapeake Railway(WP&CR). John P. Poe, a lawyer, represented parties in several cases involving the rail line and eventually became a director of the WP&CR.

They quickly set to exerting their control over the tracks the SMR had built in the District, beginning ejectment hearings against the Chesapeake Beach Railway in 1902. In 1898, the CBR took possession of this section of railway, presumably via a tax auction and used it for its operation, ejecting the W&P in 1901. The case went to the Supreme Court and in 1905 WP&CR won and took title to the railway. The CBR then stopped running on the DC section of the railway, instead stopping at the train station in Seat Pleasant called District Line. In 1911, the CBR started leasing the District section of the line and continued until the WP&CR went out of business in 1918. At that point they purchased the section.

In 1903, the WP&CR sought to revive the SMR's rights to enter the District.

In 1905, the railroad started acquiring right-of-way to extend the railroad to Esperanza, where the Navy was considering a base across from Drum Point, but no work was ever done.

In November 1909, the railroad went into foreclosure and was purchased by Henry Winfield Watson who brought in Edgar A. and John P. Poe and the new owners again planned to extend the railroad to Esperanza. Watson tried to extend the rail line, but money from French investors fell through in 1911 and again in 1912 because of the war in Turkey. Owners of the competing Washington and Tidewater railroad, tried to get the state to force Watson to either build more rail or allow them to - as under Maryland law he was required to build 5 miles of rail by November 1914. For years afterward, residents of St. Mary's County and owners of other chartered railroads tried to get the WP&CR's charter revoked as there was still interest in completing the line or a parallel one.

The railroad was eventually sold to a New York corporation that was then dissolved. On December 31, 1917 the railroad was shut down and the company began removing the track, about a half mile of it, for scrap due to the high price of scrap metal during World War I. Maryland's senators then called on the U.S. government to buy the railroad to keep it from being removed, arguing that it had a critical national defense purpose. When that failed, Rep. Syd Mudd had the government cancel the contracts to buy the scrap metal from the new owners and had the court intervene to prevent their removal.

=== Washington, Brandywine & Point Lookout Railroad ===
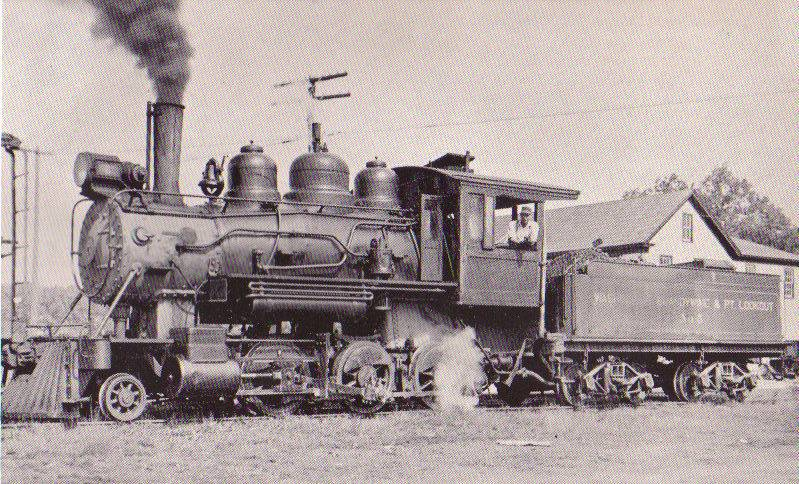
WB&PL Engine No. 5 at Mechanicsville, Maryland, on September 1, 1934

After it was shut down and nearly scrapped in 1918, a new company, the Washington, Brandywine & Point Lookout Railroad was formed to purchase it. That company, owned by locals along the line, was unable to raise the full amount needed so the federal government lent them $50,000, on the grounds of military necessity and on the condition that the government would oversee and supervise operations of the railroad. The purchase was completed in July 1918. By 1919, trains were running again, using a gasoline engine for passengers and a steam engine for freight.

In November 1921, work began on expanding the line to Hollywood and then to Esperanza with a spur off the main line south of California, where they hoped to gain access to an important freight terminal, and then later to Point Lookout. The work was made easier because much of the route had been surveyed and graded in the 1880's. They had hoped to reach Hollywood by the summer of 1922, but work stalled and the extension only made it as far as Forrest Hall, where a new station opened in 1926. Rains in August 1928 caused three washouts, which halted service for two months. In that same year, the railroad ended passenger service because it was no longer profitable. The railroad helped carry material for building the paved highway (which brought more competition from trucks), schools and repairing the military school in Charlotte Hall and also pulp, wood, lumber and farm products outbound and merchandise, fertilizer, machinery and gasoline inbound.

By 1920, the struggling WB&PL was unable to make payments on the principle of its loan to the federal government and quit paying interest in 1932, despite being exempt from state taxes. However "the perseverance and personal sacrifice of the management and stockholders" along with the forbearance of the federal government and other lenders allowed them to keep operating through the Great Depression and increased competition from trucking. For a time, the railroad ran two trains a week, and on other days employees worked on their farms.

In 1940, the railroad had to stop running trains between Mechanicsville and Forrest Hall because of poor maintenance and later that year it sought, and received, permission to abandon that segment.

=== Navy control ===
On June 1, 1942, the federal government took over operation of the line; 15 days later, it took possession of the railroad under the Second War Powers Act. The United States Navy put the railroad to use moving the vast amount of equipment needed to build and support Patuxent River Naval Air Station, the Cedar Point facility where the service's aeronautics bureau had consolidated its aviation testing programs. The Navy replaced the existing rail with newer, heavier rail; rehabilitated the track structure; acquired new right-of-way, and extended service to Millstone Landing on the Patuxent River, the Air Station's northernmost point. They changed the name to the U.S. Naval Air Station Railroad, although it was also known as the Brandywine and Cedar Point Railroad, the Patuxent Railroad or just the U.S. Government Railroad.

In April 1943, the Navy paid the company $127,500 to settle their claims and ran their first train that month. It included a wye just north of Lexington Park with a small stub into north Lexington Park and 15 miles of siding and yard track. Its 32 employees operated three diesel locomotives and 110 cars. The Navy operated an "accommodation" train that connected with the Pennsylvania Railroad in Brandywine until the PRR stopped passenger trains on the Pope's Creek Line in 1949. By 1952, the Navy had 55 miles of track, three diesel locomotives, and three dozen railcars delivering gasoline, coal, ammunition and airplane parts.

By 1953, the aging track rails were frequently breaking; operators requested that the rails be replaced. After a cost/benefit analysis, the Navy decided to discontinue service. The last train ran from Patuxent NAS to Hollywood on June 30, 1954, carrying employees, family members, troops, and the station's band playing music.

=== Pennsylvania Railroad control ===
The Navy chose not to dispose of the railroad, to leave it "available for prompt return to the Government should occasion arise." and later that year, the PRR took control. It continued to run a weekly train through St. Mary's and used the line to deliver aviation fuel to the base. However, when fuel started coming in by barge in 1966, the importance of the line dwindled.

In 1962, the Pennsy built a spur off of the line from the north side of Hughesville to the new Chalk Point Generating Station to deliver coal, bringing renewed value to the northern 11.5 miles of track. This track is called the Herbert Subdivision, while the source of the name is not confirmed, one source attributes it to John C. Herbert, who was a Vice-President of PEPCO at the time.

Chalk Point operator GenOn Energy Holdings closed the two coal-fired units at the plant in June 2021. The plant is scheduled for full decommissioning in 2027.

Without coal trains there are no more regular customers on the subdivision and in 2022 the Chalk Point switchers were moved out of state. It has been suggested that the line be used for transit, but a 2009 study considered the route for commuter rail and found it to be circuitous, slow, and costly.

=== Abandonment of the Cedar Point Branch ===
In 1965, with the Cedar Point branch in bad shape, the PRR stopped running trains on it.

In 1966, the Navy said it no longer needed the line and the line south of Hughesville was declared government excess.

When train operation ceased on the section from Hughesville to Patuxent, it was offered for sale by the GSA, and St. Mary's County moved quickly to obtain the option to purchase it. In 1968 they struck a deal with the Southern Maryland Electric Cooperative (SMECO), where SMECO provided the $225,000 needed to purchase it, and in return they were granted a utility easement on the corridor. On June 26, 1970, the St. Mary's County Commissioners purchased 28 miles of the abandoned right-of-way from Hughesville to Patuxent River for a utility corridor.

The tracks were removed in the mid-1970 and SMECO put transmission lines on the right-of way. The State Roads Commission had been trying to acquire part of the ROW for use expanding SR-235 since 1959, and when the county purchased it in 1970, the SRC got the right to use whatever portions it needed in exchange for financing the replacement of the lost section of utility corridor. The highway was widened onto the railroad ROW in three parts in 1973, 1982 and 1985. In the late 20th century, the county sold numerous easements across the right-of-way to adjacent landowners and beneath 2.5 miles of it to the Washington Gas Light Company.

In 1998, there was a state bill that would have required that the right-of-way be proposed for a light rail line to the then-proposed Branch Avenue Metro station, but the bill didn't pass and the effort never got started.

In 2006 the state and county began to build a rail trail, the Three Notch Trail, on the right-of-way.

== Stations ==
Original line: pre-1926

- Brandywine
- Cedarville
- Woodville
- Gallant Green
- Hughesville
- Oaks
- Charlotte Hall
- New Market
- Mechanicsville (original terminus)

In 1926, the line was extended to Forrest Hall but then that section was abandoned in 1940

- Forrest Hall

In 1942, the federal government took over operations of the railroad, rehabilitated it and extended the line adding these stops:

- Laurel Grove
- Oakville
- Hillville
- Hollywood
- California
- USN Pax River

After 1954: Pennsylvania Railroad operation

- Lexington Park

When the Navy decided it no longer wanted to operate the line in 1954, the PRR took over operations, moving freight and occasionally a USN passenger car or caboose for special movements to/from the Brandywine Junction, which became a Department of Defense Warehouse and shipping point until it was destroyed by fire. The Brandywine terminal was U.S. government property and was maintained by Public Works personnel from Patuxent River. The terminal was turned over to the Air Force just before it burned.

== Surviving landmarks ==
- CSXT trackage that runs from Brandywine to Hughesville, where it connects to a spur to the Chalk Point Generating Station. These tracks are now part of CSX's Herbert Subdivision
- From Hughesville to John V. Baggett Park, the railroad's right-of-way is used as a utility corridor and the northern 10.6-miles of the Three Notch Trail. Its first mile opened on June 3, 2006; and the last piece of this section was finished in 2016.
- From John V. Baggett Park to South Sandgates Road, and from Rescue Lane to FDR Boulevard the right-of-way is used for the southbound lanes of MD-235
- Mileposts, MP13 & W still exist.
- From South Sandgates Road to Rescue Lane and from FDR Boulevard to Pegg Road the right-of-way is a utility corridor and a future route of the Three Notch Trail, though some short sections of the trail have been built in this area.
- At the Naval Air Station the right-of-way is used for parts of Bose Road, Davis Spur Road, Tate Road and Bonnie Road and tracks remain in the Supply Department section of the base as well as across one of the runways.
- The Point Lookout Railroad Trail in Point Lookout State Park was constructed on the cleared right-of-way of the railroad at Point Lookout
