= Pope's Creek Subdivision =

Railway line in Maryland

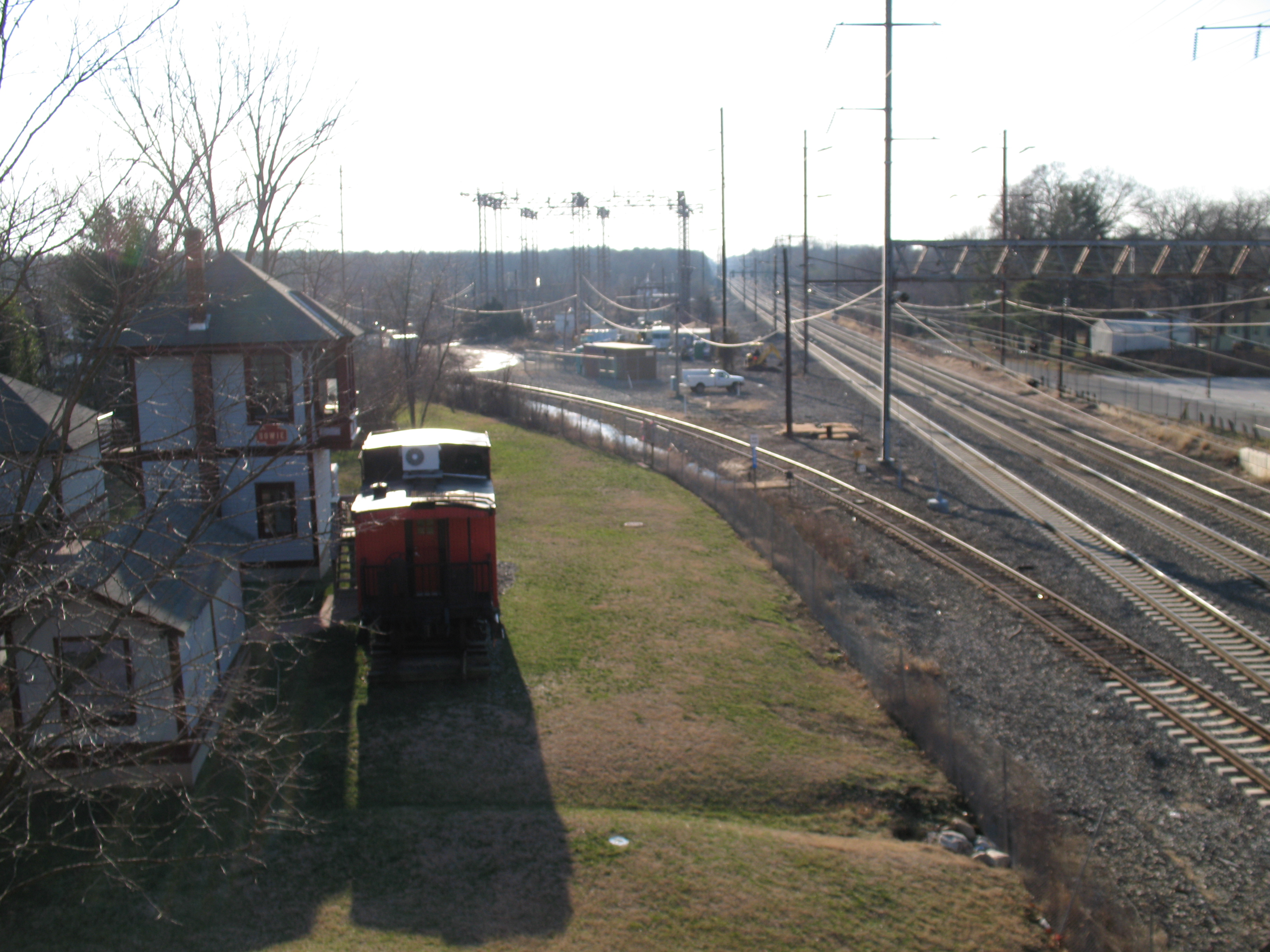
Bowie Junction, where the Pope's Creek Subdivision (left) meets the Northeast Corridor (right). The Bowie interlocking tower, no longer operational, has been restored and is part of the Huntington Railroad Museum.

The Pope's Creek Subdivision is a CSX Transportation railroad line in Maryland, running from Bowie to the Morgantown Generating Station in Morgantown, Maryland. The Herbert Subdivision to the Chalk Point Generating Station connects to it at Brandywine and the Indian Head-White Plains railroad used to connect to it at White Plains. Its name comes from Pope's Creek in Newburg, MD to where it originally ran.

== History ==
=== Origins and construction ===
The Baltimore and Potomac Railroad (B&P) was chartered on May 6th, 1853 with the purpose of building a railroad from Baltimore to Upper Marlboro, Maryland then to a point on the Potomac River near Port Tobacco, Maryland with permission to build branches off the line not exceeding 20 miles in length. Surveying for the route began in 1855, but the company was not organized until December 19, 1858.

In the mid-1860's the Pennsylvania Railroad (PRR) had access to Baltimore via its own lines: the Northern Central Railway (NCRY) from the north and the Philadelphia, Wilmington and Baltimore Railroad from the northeast. However, to travel southwest to Washington, D.C., it had to use the Baltimore and Ohio Railroad (B&O) and its Washington Branch. Since the PRR and B&O were rivals, the Maryland General Assembly refused to grant the PRR a charter to break the B&O's monopoly on Baltimore-Washington travel. The PRR saw the existing Baltimore and Potomac charter's clause allowing branches to be built within 20 miles (32 km) of Washington as an opportunity to get around that. The PRR joined into a partnership with the B&P to build the rail line, with the branch, for that purpose.

As a result in 1866 the B&P sought permission to build a branch into Washington from a point within 2 miles of the Collington (now Bowie) Post Office in Prince George's County and also signed a contract to begin construction of the main line between Baltimore and the Potomac.

Permission was granted by an act approved Feb 5, 1867, the PRR bought a controlling share of the B&P Stock and construction of the railroad started for the section between the Annapolis and Elk Ridge Railroad and Upper Marlboro in the next year. Work on the line from Bowie to the District started around the same time. It was almost entirely paid for by the PRR and NCRY.

By the end of 1869, the right-of-way had been graded from Bowie to Marlboro; and several small bridges had been constructed.

In 1870, the B&P selected Pope's Creek as the point at which the railroad would connect to the Potomac River because it was shorter, cheaper and more direct than any other option; and offered a desirable port which would allow for a steamboat connection to the RF&P. During that year they also surveyed the entire route. Work on the line to Pope's Creek began before the end of the year.

By 1871, B&P track had been laid from the Patapsco River through Bowie to Beaver Dam, and once that work was complete on Oct 25th, tracklayers started laying track from Bowie towards Marlboro. By early 1872 they had built a bridge over Collington Branch and by February they had built rail from the north to within two miles of Upper Marlboro and from the south a bridge over Pope's Creek where they had landed a locomotive and construction cars.

The final spike for the Pope's Creek Branch was driven on June 10th, 1872 by Capt. John E. Whitter, who was in charge of construction, but the road needed to be ballasted before opening and was not ready when the line between Baltimore and Washington started passenger service on July 2, 1872. The B&P started running freight trains on the route to Marlboro later in the summer and passenger trains there by November. The line to Pope's Creek was finished in late December, formally opened on January 1, 1873 and the first trains were run the next day. It remained the main line in title only but was treated as though it had branch status.

The main line was connected to the NCRY when the Baltimore and Potomac Tunnel opened on June 29, 1873.

=== Chesapeake Beach Railway ===
In 1899 the Chesapeake Beach Railway, which had reached Upper Marlboro from Washington, DC the year before, was built over the Pope's Creek Branch.

=== Philadelphia, Baltimore and Washington Railroad ===
In 1902, the B&P was merged with the Philadelphia, Wilmington and Baltimore Railroad to form the Philadelphia, Baltimore and Washington Railroad.

=== Declining use ===
The B&P ran two trains a day on the Pope's Creek line, a passenger train and a combination passenger/freight train from the time service started until 1921 when it increased the number to four trains a day. But in 1937, with dropping passenger service, it tapered down to just one train a day. Finally all passenger service from Bowie to Pope's Creek ended on October 29, 1949. An excursion train road the line to Pope's Creek in 1955, possibly the last passenger train on the line that far south; but in 1966, Democratic Congressional candidate Harry A. Boswell, Jr. rented a locomotive and rail car for a campaign ride that went to Brandywine - because of the weight of the car and the condition of the rail the PRR wouldn't let him go any farther south. Boswell came in 3rd in the primary, losing to Hervey Machen.

Freight service also declined. In 1943 the freight operation was still moving feed and farm supplies, coal, beer from Baltimore and pulpwood and payphone coins from Southern Maryland. For a few years after World War II, the Navy scrapped ships at the pier at Pope's Creek and the train would carry scrap metal north, but that work dried up. The rail also carried powder from Indian Head but at some point after World War II the Navy closed the smokeless powder production operations there, which cut business on the line as well. By the time passenger service ended in 1949, only a local freight on an irregular schedule was used. The SMECO power plant at Pope's Creek, which it had supplied with coal, went out of service in 1953 and the Navy stopped running trains to Patuxent River the next year. However the rail line still served the Pope's Creek Salvage Company, which scrapped ships and sent the steel to the Bethlehem Steel plant at Sparrow's Point via gondola. It also hauled occasional cars of coal, logs or beer. When the salvage company closed in August of 1962, the railroads south of La Plata went out of service and by 1965 traffic south of Brandywine had essentially discontinued. The same year, the PRR stopped running trains on the Cedar Point line south of Hughesville, Maryland and the next year the Navy declared it excess.

=== Coal trains ===
New life came in the form of electricity plants. In 1962, the PRR built a spur off of the Cedar Point line from the north side of Hughesville to the new Chalk Point Generating Station to deliver coal starting in 1964. This spur was called the Herbert Subdivision. While the name of the line to Chalk Point is a not well documented, one source attributes it to John C. Herbert, who was a Vice-President of PEPCO at the time.

A few years later, in the late 1960's, Pepco built 6 miles of rail from Faulker, MD\Lothair Station to the Morgantown Generating Station to facilitate construction of that facility. When the Morgantown plant opened in 1970 it used fuel brought by barge, and some coal brought- mostly by truck. In 1973 traffic was so low that a spokesperson for the Maryland Department of Economic and Community Development said that no trains had run on the line in 5 to 6 years. However, due to the oil crises of 1973, the plant switched exclusively to coal and, due to the volume, brought it by train on the Pope's Creek Subdivision. The increased traffic necessitated significant rehabilitation of the line.

=== Ownership changes ===
Ownership of the old B&P line passed from the PRR to the Penn Central Transportation Company in 1968 and to Conrail in 1976. In 1981, the section from Baltimore to Washington, known as the Northeast Corridor (NEC), was sold to Amtrak, and the line from Bowie to Faulkner was retained by Conrail. When Conrail was split in 1999, CSX Transportation was assigned the line. The power company owns the railroad line south of Faulkner.

=== Abandonments ===
In the early 1970's, the line from Faulkner to Pope's Creek was scrapped.

In 2022, GenOn closed its two coal-fired units at the Morgantown Generating Station which put an end to the regular coal trains to Morgantown.

== Subdivisions ==
=== Herbert Subdivision ===
In the spring of 1872, before the line to Pope's Creek had even opened, the Southern Maryland Railroad began to grade a rail line from Brandywine to Point Lookout, Maryland. Due to funding delays, the line didn't start running trains until 1883, and even then only to Mechanicsville, MD. That line was later expanded to Forrest Hall, Maryland in 1926 and then scaled back to Mechanicsville again in 1940. In 1942, the Navy took over the line and expanded it to the Patuxent River Naval Air Station at Cedar Point. In 1954 the Navy gave up ownership of the line and it was handed over to the Pennsylvania Railroad which, in 1962, built a spur from the north side of Hughesville to the new Chalk Point Generating Station to deliver coal and equipment. This track is called the Herbert Subdivision, while the source of the name is not confirmed, one source attributes it to John C. Herbert, who was a Vice-President of PEPCO at the time. In 1965, the PRR quit running trains south of Hughesville and in the 1970's the track was removed, leaving Chalk Point as the only customer.

Chalk Point operator GenOn Energy Holdings closed the two coal-fired units at the plant in June 2021 reducing rail traffic to almost zero. The plant is scheduled for full decommissioning in 2027. In 2022 the Chalk Point switchers were moved out of state. Without coal trains there are no more regular customers on the subdivision.

=== Indian Head ===
In 1918-19, during World War I the Navy used German POWs to build a spur off the Pope's Creek Subdivision from White Plains to the Naval Powder Factory at Indian Head to aid in the production of smokeless powder (a propellant used in firearms and artillery). Prior to that a local "orphan railroad" had connected the base to barge traffic, but the war necessitated a better connection. The 14.5 mile railroad was opened on Armistice Day - May 29, 1919 - but was not completed for actual service for several months. It continued to provide an important link for the production of powder during World War II, but lost much of its usefulness when powder production ended in 1956. It continued to be used to bring coal, supplies and other materials to Indian Head until the early 1970's. It went out of service around 1989.

In 1999, the Navy gave "Northern Central Railways" permission to run a tourist train, known as the "Indian Head Central Railroad," (IHCR) on the line. The first train ran later that year on what the IHCR reported was a refurbished line and the IHCR ran an excursion train in March 2000. In May of 2000, they reported that an upgrade had been completed to allow passenger travel but in June, following reports of several derailments, a Maryland inspector again ruled that the tracks were unfit for passenger travel and the Navy ordered them to shutdown. Following a series of other lease violations, including storing two dozen derelict rail cars on the tracks, the lease was terminated in early 2001.

With the failure of the tourist train the Navy briefly considered using the line to have coal delivered to the base, but found the investment required for repairs was too great, so in 2003 the Navy announced plans to donate the railroad line west of Mattingly Avenue in Indian Head to Charles County for the creation of a trail. The spur, including the tracks and 6 Long Island Railroad cars that had been abandoned by the IHCR, was donated to Charles County as part of the Federal Lands-to-Parks program in 2006 and the Navy's two locomotives were sold at auction. In 2007, Alcoa considered building a 950-megawatt coal-fired plant on the Indian Head Naval Surface Warfare Center and using the rail line to deliver the coal, but then decided that if they built the plant they would not need the rails. In 2008 the rails and ties were removed and recycled, and the line was converted to a rail trail that opened late in the year. The six LIRR cars were dismantled and scrapped.

== Current operation ==
The Pope's Creek Subdivision currently hosts 2 to 3 trains a week (a down and back rock train to Aggregate Industries in La Plata; a rock train to Chaney Enterprizes in Waldorf and an occasional local serving a few businesses in the Waldorf and La Plata area) from its interchange at Bowie with Amtrak's Northeast Corridor main line. A wye track exists at Bowie to allow trains to enter Amtrak's main line and go north or south, so that a second engine or cab car is not needed. Amtrak limits these trains to late night/very early morning runs and no more than 160 cars. The line is mostly single tracked, with long sidings in Collington, Upper Marlboro and Brandywine.

The coal-fired units at Morgantown and Chalk Point Generating Stations have been closed, and there is no longer regular service to these points, but the lines have not been abandoned.

== Future use studies ==
In 2007, the National Capitol Planning Commission studied options for rerouting freight traffic around Washington, and two of the three options considered using the Pope's Creek Subdivision. One option took trains down to the Indian Head branch and then across the Potomac on a new 2.5 mile long rail bridge to Arkendale, VA. Another option used the Pope's Creek subdivision all the way to Newberg, MD and then across the Potomac on a two-mile long railway drawbridge to Dahlgren, VA. The plans were never funded.

A 2009 study considered the route for commuter rail and found it to be circuitous, slow, and costly.

The rail's right-of-way is being considered for a parallel light-rail project called the Southern Maryland Rapid Transit Project. A 2017 study proposed running a light rail line alongside the Pope's Creek Subdivision from White Plains north to the county line and then from the rail line to the Branch Avenue Metro, but if the line were ever abandoned the study recommended modifying the plan to use the rail corridor. In 2021, the Maryland legislature passed legislation mandating the Maryland Department of Transportation (MDOT) to promptly complete the design, engineering, and environmental reviews, and secure a federal record-of-decision on the project. In 2022, Congress approved a $5 million grant, matched by the state, for the project. In 2023, the legislature appropriated $100 million in the state budget for SMRT and the Red Line in Baltimore, and as a result the full planning was funded. But in 2024, the budget was cut from $30 million to $2.1 million, bringing the future of the project into question.

== Legacy ==
Most of the rail line, from Bowie to Faulkner is still extent and either in use or available for use.

Much of the railbed of the abandoned section between Faulkner and Pope's Creek, including a rail trestle over Pope's Creek remains. The county acquired the abandoned Pope's Creek Railroad corridor south of Faulkner (and several adjacent properties) in 2014. It had been planning to turn the corridor into a rail trail and park since at least 2007. Despite completed plans in 2017 and a 2018 groundbreaking, the trail has yet to be constructed. In 2021, the county acquired Gilligan’s Pier, a 17.54-acre site located along Popes Creek, bordered on the north by the rail line for the purpose of building a park adjacent to the rail trail. In 2024, Phase I of the trail received a $1.8M grant from MDOT.

Most of the Indian Head spur has been turned into the Indian Head Rail Trail, but some of the rails west of Mattingly Avenue in Indian Head and across Robert S. Crain Highway in White Plains remain. Also a short section was retained next to the trail west of Livingston Road.

Most of the stations on the route are gone, but not all. The La Plata train station has been turned into the La Plata Train Station Museum. It features a U.S. Navy caboose, still lettered for the U.S. Navy, that used to run on the Indian Head subdivision.

== See also ==
- List of CSX Transportation lines
