= Chesapeake Beach railway station =

- U.S. National Register of Historic Places
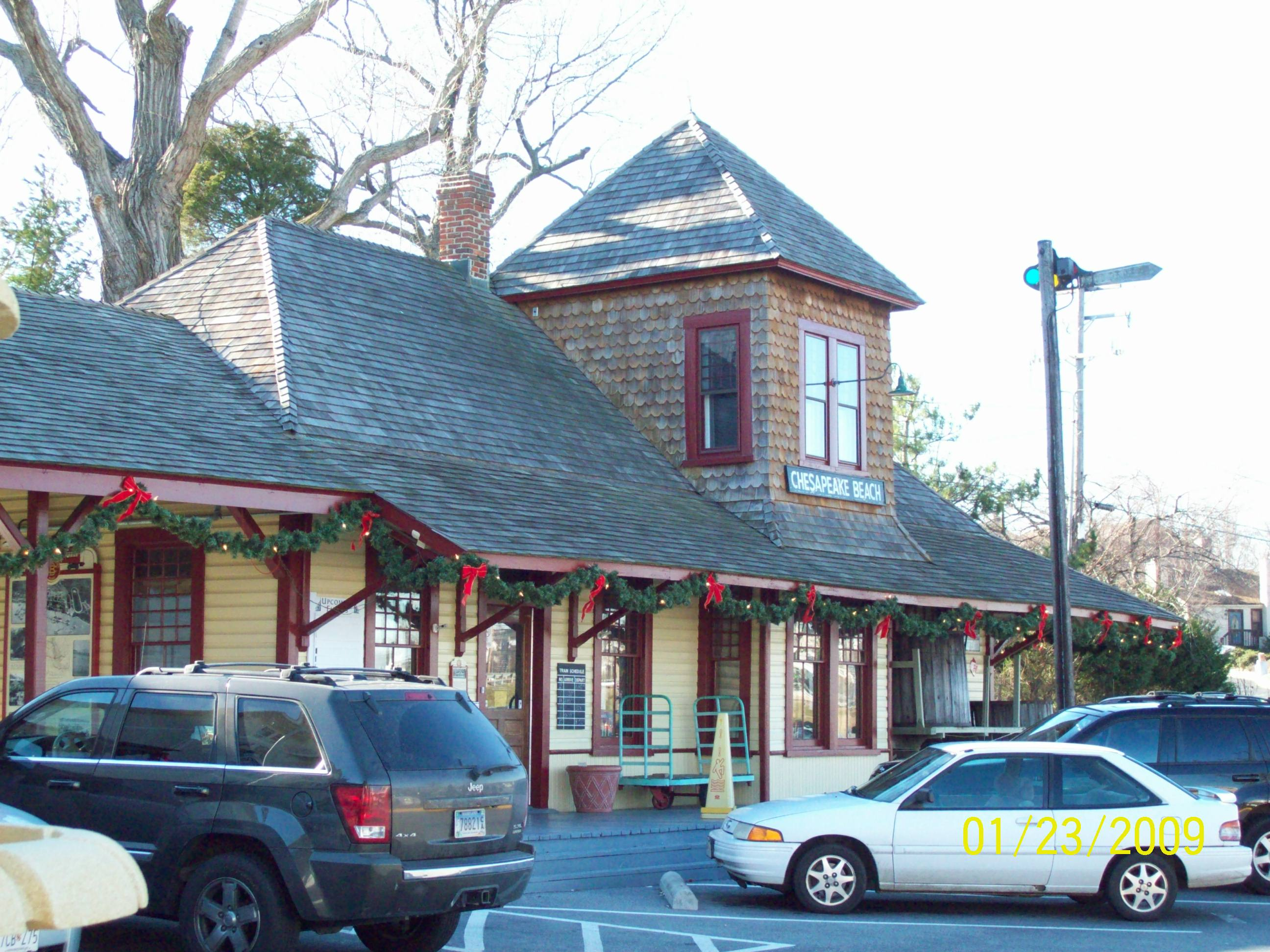
- Chesapeake Beach railway station, December 2008

- Location within Maryland Location within the United States
- Location: 8005 Bayside Rd., Chesapeake Beach, Maryland
- Coordinates: 38°41′24″N 76°32′3″W
- Built: 1898
- Architect: Mr. Winston
- NRHP reference No.: 80001798
- Added to NRHP: September 11, 1980

The Chesapeake Beach railway station is a historic railway station located at Chesapeake Beach, Calvert County, Maryland, United States. It is composed of two one-story, hip-roofed sections; one part was once an open passenger boarding area that was later enclosed for storage. The station was erected in 1898, for the Chesapeake Beach Railway. It is now operated as a railway museum.

The Chesapeake Beach Railway Station was listed on the National Register of Historic Places in 1980.

== History ==
The station was originally opened as a stop along the railway when Otto Mears sought to create a resort town at the Chesapeake Bay between Baltimore and Washington, D.C. Mears and his business associates established hotels, beaches, casinos and a boardwalk. On June 9, 1900, the first train arrived at the station. However, 35 years later, the Great Depression and the growing popularity of cars led to a decline in business. The last train left the station on April 15, 1935.

== Museum ==
The station was dedicated as a museum to the Calvert County Board of Commissioners by Gerald and Fred Donovan in 1979. The Calvert County Historical Society is responsible for maintaining the building and its exhibits. The museum features artifacts, exhibits and programs commemorating the Chesapeake Beach Railway and local history.

== See also ==
- Chesapeake Beach Railway
- Chesapeake Beach, Maryland
