= Chesapeake Beach, Maryland =

Town in Maryland, U.S.

- Town
- Town of Chesapeake Beach
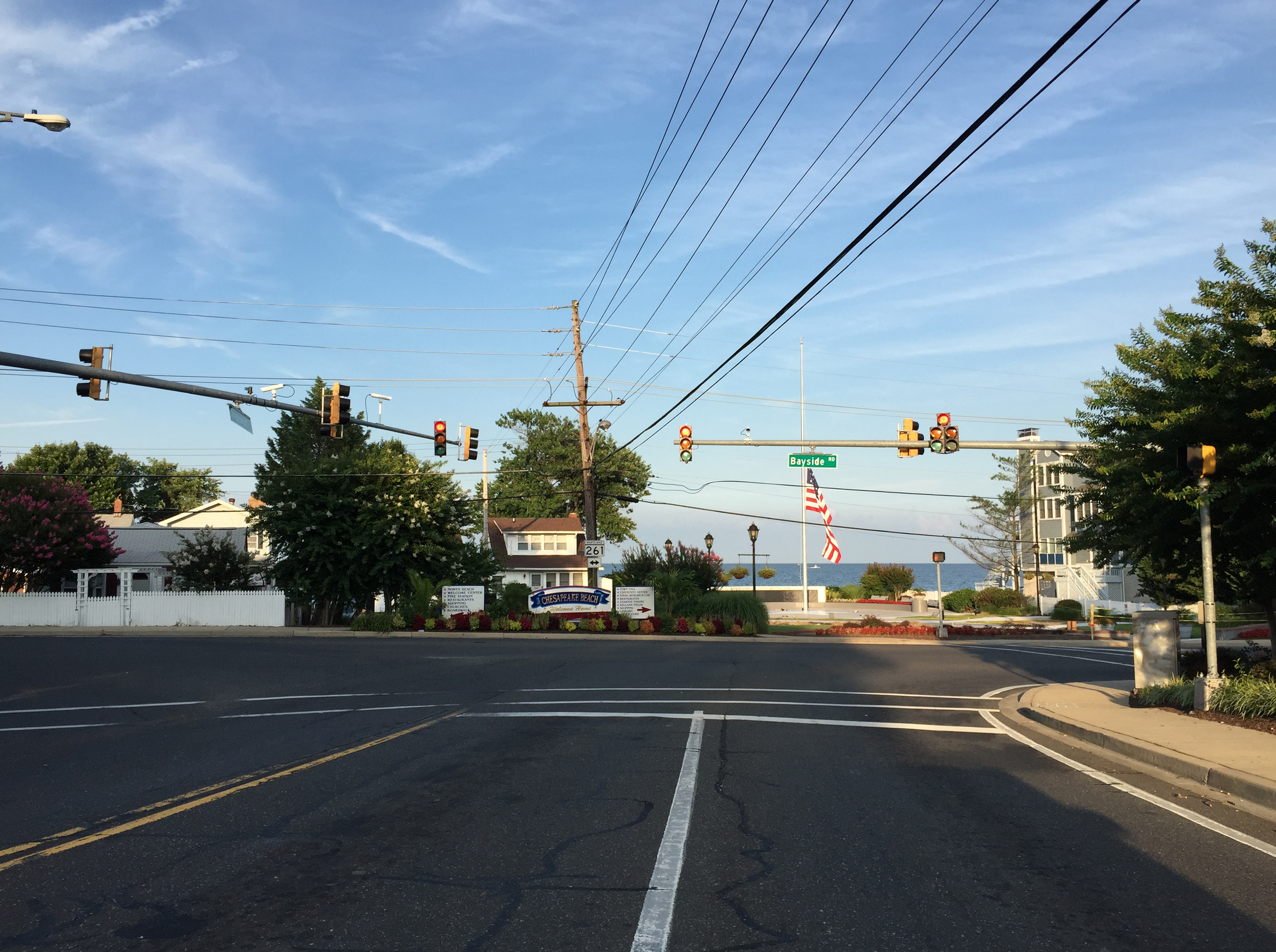

- Flag Logo
- Nickname: "Twin Beaches"
- Location of Chesapeake Beach, Maryland
- Coordinates: 38°41′42″N 76°32′10″W
- Country: United States
- State: Maryland
- County: Calvert
- Incorporated: 1886 (repealed 1888, reincorporated 1894)

Government
  - Mayor: Bruce Wahl

Area
  - Total: 2.78 sq mi (7.21 km^{2})
  - Land: 2.69 sq mi (6.97 km^{2})
  - Water: 0.089 sq mi (0.23 km^{2})
- Elevation: 49 ft (15 m)

Population (2020)
  - Total: 6,356
  - Density: 2,361/sq mi (911.4/km^{2})
- Time zone: UTC-5 (Eastern (EST))
  - Summer (DST): UTC-4 (EDT)
- ZIP code: 20732
- Area code: 301
- FIPS code: 24-15925
- GNIS feature ID: 0589951
- Website: www.chesapeakebeachmd.gov

Chesapeake Beach is a town in Calvert County, Maryland, United States. Its major attractions include the Chesapeake Beach Railway Station, the Chesapeake Beach Rail Trail, a water park, marinas, piers, and charter boat fishing. As of the 2020 census, Chesapeake Beach had a population of 6,356.

== Geography ==
Chesapeake Beach is located at 38°41′42″N 76°32′10″W (38.695070, -76.536125).

According to the United States Census Bureau, the town has a total area of 2.79 square miles (7.23 km^{2}), of which 2.71 square miles (7.02 km^{2}) is land and 0.08 square miles (0.21 km^{2}) is water.

The city has grown out from the intersection of Fishing Creek and the Chesapeake Bay. The creek has been dredged to allow pleasure craft, commercial fisherman and a few small US Navy vessels to dock in the city. Fishing Creek is a breeding sanctuary for Crassostrea virginica, as well as Chrysaora chesapeakei.

The southern end of the city remains heavily wooded and is distinguished by the large sandstone cliffs called the Randle Cliffs. These cliffs tower as high as 110 feet above the water and are constantly eroding due to freeze/thaw and wave action. The debris from these cliffs has formed a number of shallow sand bars which makes navigation by boat near the cliffs very difficult and the water very shallow for hundreds of yards into the bay.

Located at the center of town is the Chesapeake Beach Veterans' Memorial Park. It features a very large American flag and a waterfall fountain.

A boardwalk along the Bay spans from 17th Street, down to the southern terminus of B Street and the northern entrance to Brownies Beach/Bayfront Park.

== Transportation ==
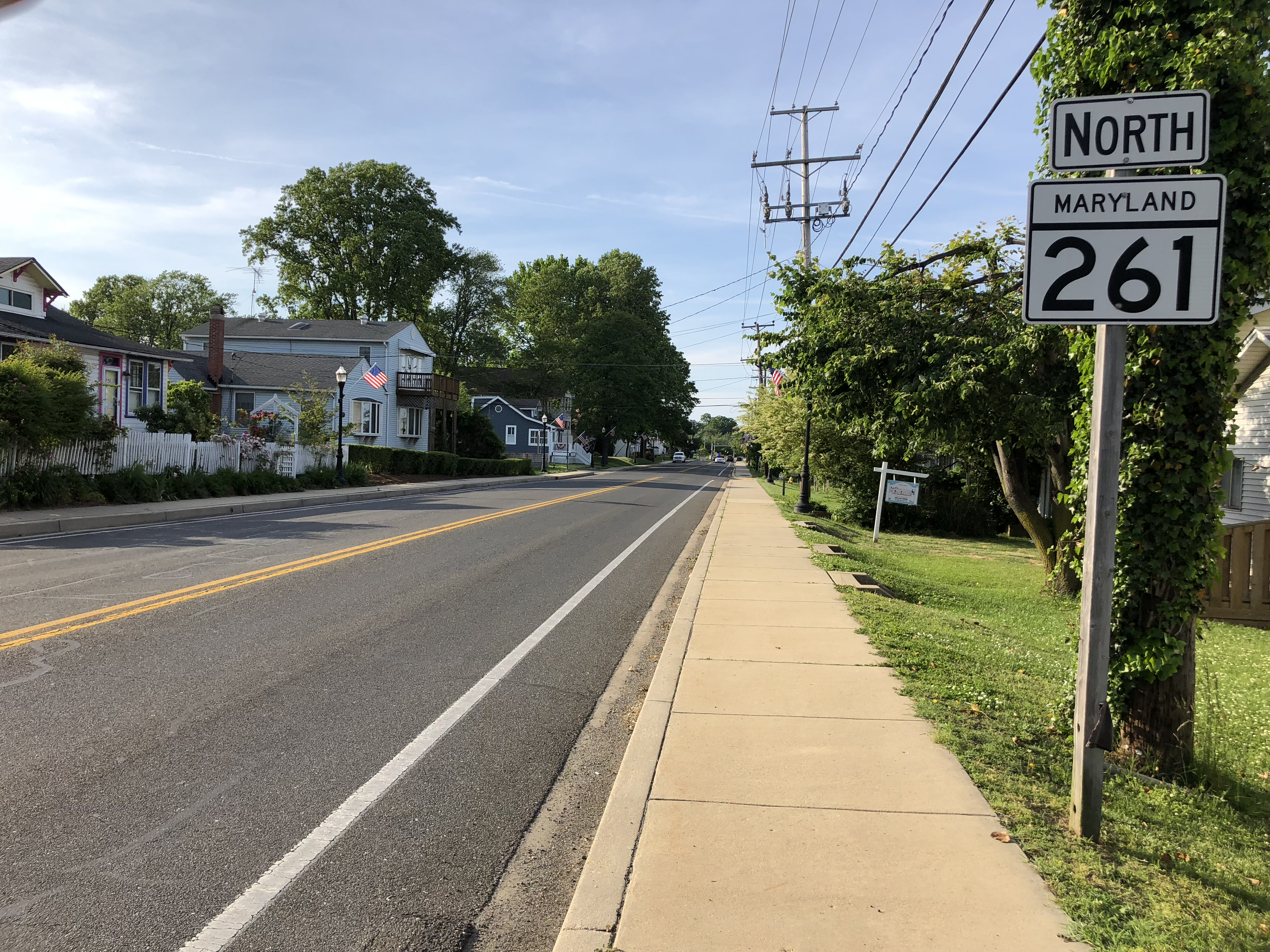
MD 261 northbound in Chesapeake Beach

The primary method of travel to and from Chesapeake Beach is presently by road, and two state highways currently serve the town. Maryland Route 260 follows Chesapeake Beach Road into the town, providing a direct connection between the town and both Maryland Route 2 and Maryland Route 4. MD 2 leads north to Annapolis and Baltimore, while MD 4 heads northwest to Washington, D.C. Maryland Route 261 is the other highway directly serving the town, following Bayside Road from south to north through Chesapeake Beach and providing connections to other communities along the Chesapeake Bay. Cox Road is unsigned Maryland Route 775, and is a former alignment of MD 260.

== Demographics ==
Historical population
Census	Pop.	Note	%±
1940	326		—
1950	504		54.6%
1960	731		45.0%
1970	934		27.8%
1980	1,408		50.7%
1990	2,403		70.7%
2000	3,180		32.3%
2010	5,753		80.9%
2020	6,356		10.5%
U.S. Decennial Census

=== 2020 census ===
As of the 2020 census, Chesapeake Beach had a population of 6,356. The median age was 37.7 years. 27.2% of residents were under the age of 18 and 11.5% of residents were 65 years of age or older. For every 100 females there were 90.0 males, and for every 100 females age 18 and over there were 87.4 males age 18 and over.

100.0% of residents lived in urban areas, while 0.0% lived in rural areas.

There were 2,337 households in Chesapeake Beach, of which 42.8% had children under the age of 18 living in them. Of all households, 53.4% were married-couple households, 12.9% were households with a male householder and no spouse or partner present, and 27.5% were households with a female householder and no spouse or partner present. About 21.1% of all households were made up of individuals and 8.7% had someone living alone who was 65 years of age or older.

There were 2,542 housing units, of which 8.1% were vacant. The homeowner vacancy rate was 2.1% and the rental vacancy rate was 10.4%.

Racial composition as of the 2020 census
Race	Number	Percent
White	4,832	76.0%
Black or African American	699	11.0%
American Indian and Alaska Native	8	0.1%
Asian	99	1.6%
Native Hawaiian and Other Pacific Islander	18	0.3%
Some other race	92	1.4%
Two or more races	608	9.6%
Hispanic or Latino (of any race)	317	5.0%

=== 2010 census ===
As of the census of 2010, there were 5,753 people, 2,134 households, and 1,520 families residing in the town. The population density was 2,122.9 inhabitants per square mile (819.7/km^{2}). There were 2,354 housing units at an average density of 868.6 units per square mile (335.4 units/km^{2}). The racial makeup of the town was 84.8% White, 9.8% African American, 0.6% Native American, 1.4% Asian, 0.6% from other races, and 2.8% from two or more races. Hispanic or Latino of any race were 2.8% of the population.

There were 2,134 households, of which 43.1% had children under the age of 18 living with them, 51.4% were married couples living together, 15.2% had a female householder with no husband present, 4.6% had a male householder with no wife present, and 28.8% were non-families. 21.6% of all households were made up of individuals, and 5.6% had someone living alone who was 65 years of age or older. The average household size was 2.70 and the average family size was 3.15.

The median age in the town was 36.2 years. 28.6% of residents were under the age of 18; 6.8% were between the ages of 18 and 24; 29.6% were from 25 to 44; 27.7% were from 45 to 64; and 7.1% were 65 years of age or older. The gender makeup of the town was 48.1% male and 51.9% female.

=== 2000 census ===
As of the census of 2000, there were 3,180 people, 1,217 households, and 862 families residing in the town. The population density was 1,144.7 inhabitants per square mile (442.0/km^{2}). There were 1,331 housing units at an average density of 479.1 units per square mile (185.0 units/km^{2}). The racial makeup of the town was 91.51% White, 5.28% African American, 0.35% Native American, 1.10% Asian, 0.38% from other races, and 1.38% from two or more races. Hispanic or Latino of any race were 1.42% of the population.

There were 1,217 households, out of which 35.2% had children under the age of 18 living with them, 52.7% were married couples living together, 12.9% had a female householder with no husband present, and 29.1% were non-families. 21.6% of all households were made up of individuals, and 5.4% had someone living alone who was 65 years of age or older. The average household size was 2.61 and the average family size was 3.03.

In the town, the population was spread out, with 27.2% under the age of 18, 7.4% from 18 to 24, 34.4% from 25 to 44, 24.0% from 45 to 64, and 7.0% who were 65 years of age or older. The median age was 36 years. For every 100 females, there were 99.1 males. For every 100 females age 18 and over, there were 93.8 males.

The median income for a household in the town was $68,365, and the median income for a family was $74,167. Males had a median income of $43,125 versus $35,865 for females. The per capita income for the town was $29,616. About 1.6% of families and 3.8% of the population were below the poverty line, including 3.8% of those under age 18 and 5.5% of those age 65 or over.

== History ==
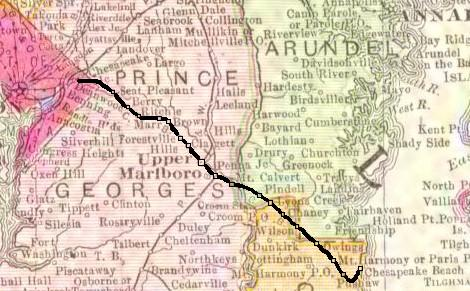
Map of old Chesapeake Beach Railroad from D.C. to Chesapeake Beach

Chesapeake Beach was established as a resort community at the end of the Chesapeake Beach Railway, a short line railroad from Washington, DC. It was the site of many slot machines in the early twentieth century (despite efforts to prohibit them) as part of the "Little Nevada" area of southern Maryland. Between steamer ships from Baltimore and trains from Washington, the weekend population of Chesapeake Beach reached into the 10,000s during the 1920s, until economic depression, and a bad hotel fire, brought an end to the railroad. The construction of the Bay Bridge to the Eastern Shore of Maryland in the 1950s enabled many of the visitors who used to spend their summers in Chesapeake Beach to now spend their time in Ocean City, Maryland instead. A museum at the old railroad station still exists today in Chesapeake Beach with many historic photos and an old passenger car from the railroad. It was listed on the National Register of Historic Places in 1980. In the new millennium a boardwalk and pier, and a new condominium development have risen in Chesapeake Beach. There is also a recreational water park with water slides, a newly opened resort spa hotel, and a seafood restaurant right on the bay. The Herrington Harbour (Rose Haven) marina resort, which was voted by Marina Dock Age magazine as the best marina in the United States, is a few miles north.

Until the 1950s and early 1960s, Chesapeake Beach was segregated by race, as were many other beaches along the Chesapeake Bay at the time. The resort's amenities and amusement parks remained segregated until the passage of the Civil Rights Act of 1964, which prohibited racial segregation in public spaces. African-Americans frequented the nearby beaches of Carr's Beach and Sparrow's Beach. While discriminated against as visitors, African-Americans were essential to the construction and maintenance of the tourist infrastructure, working jobs in rail and retail.

Chesapeake Beach is also host to the United States Naval Research Laboratory Chesapeake Bay Detachment that experiments with various military radar systems and fire suppression technology. Perched atop the sandstone cliffs along the Western Shore of the Chesapeake Bay the lab is able to use their radars against a variety of surface and air targets in the Bay. Nearby Naval Air Station Patuxent River has several aircraft that assist in the Research lab's mission.

Hurricane Isabel struck Chesapeake Beach and the adjacent city of North Beach, Maryland in 2003. The storm surge pushed flood waters into both towns, damaging residences and businesses in North Beach, and knocking out electrical services for nearly a week.

On June 4, 2008, a tornado struck Chesapeake Beach, damaging many homes in Richfield Station and Bayview Hills.

On April 3, 2019, a large townhouse fire in the Courtyards at Fishing Creek neighborhood resulted in the destruction of 2 rows of townhouses, and the deaths of a woman and her 13-year-old granddaughter. On November 17, 2025, another massive fire in this neighborhood resulted in the complete destruction of an apartment building and displaced 13 families from their homes.

== Neighborhoods/subdivisions ==
The old grid streets of the town are generally divided into the North Side and South Side. East-west-running streets are numbered 10 through 31, and north–south-running streets are lettered B through J. The North Side consists of 26th through 31st Streets and C through G Streets. The South Side consists of 10th through 19th Streets and B through J Streets. 2nd through 25th Streets are located in the Summer City community and are not within Chesapeake Beach's city limits. These streets run north-to-south like the lettered streets within the town proper. First Street is located to the north of 31st Street and is shared with North Beach. There is no 21st, 22nd or 23rd Street.

Other neighborhoods include:

- The Highlands
- Bayview Hills
- Richfield Station
- Stinnett
- Courtyards at Fishing Creek
- Windward Key
- Seagate Square
- Bay Crest
- Captain's Quarters
- Chesapeake Station
- Chesapeake Village
- North Calvert Woods (not a part of the incorporated town of Chesapeake Beach)
- Randle Cliff
- Brookeside
- Dory Brooks
- Lake Karylbrook
- Locust Grove
- Holiday Beach
- Camp Roosevelt
- Heritage Woods

== Notable people ==
- Tom Clancy, author
- Thomas V. Mike Miller, Jr., president of the Maryland Senate
- Christopher Wilkinson, screenwriter, producer, and director
