= Three Notch Trail =

Rail trail in St. Mary's County, MD

Coordinates: 38°30′44″N 76°46′30″W

- Length: 10.6 miles (17.1 km)
- Location: St. Mary's County, Maryland and Charles County, Maryland
- Established: June 2006
- Trailheads: South: Baggett Park in Mechanicsville, Maryland, North: Charlotte Hall, Maryland, Future: Lexington Park, Maryland
- Use: Hiking, Biking
- Surface: Asphalt
- Website: www.stmaryscountymd.gov/docs/threenotchtrailbrochure.pdf

The Three Notch Trail is a 10.6-mile (17.1 km) (26 mile planned), shared-use rail trail in the US state of Maryland. It currently runs on the right-of-way of the old U.S. Naval Air Station Railroad from Deborah Drive in Hughesville, MD just inside Charles County to Baggett Park in Mechanicsville, MD with several short, disconnected sections in the California, MD area. It is almost entirely within St. Mary's County. The county plans to extend the trail south to Pegg Road in Lexington Park, MD and possibly as far as Great Mills Road.

The trail gets its name from the nearby Three Notch Road, the main highway between northern St. Mary's and Point Lookout since the pre-colonial days. The name is attributed to a 1704 law that stipulated "three notches of equal distance" be marked on trees to indicate the road leading to a ferry.

== History ==
The trail runs on the abandoned right-of-way of the U.S. Naval Air Station Railroad. The railroad north from Mechanicsville was graded in 1872-1873 and built in 1881-1883 by the Southern Maryland Railroad with intentions to take it all the way to Point Lookout in Scotland, MD. It was extended 2.5 miles in the 1920s to south Mechanicsville when it was the Washington, Brandywine & Point Lookout Railroad. It was extended again in 1942, after the Navy took control of it, to the Naval Air Station Patuxent River and was officially called the U.S. Naval Air Station Railroad, but sometimes by other names including the Brandywine and Cedar Point Railroad. When operating the train became too expensive, passenger service was ended in 1949 and the Navy stopped running trains in 1954. The Pennsylvania Railroad continued using the line to deliver aviation fuel into the 1960s but, when that started being brought by barge, service ended and the last train ran south of Hughesville in 1965.

On June 26, 1970, 28 miles of the ROW in the county was purchased by St. Mary's County for a utility right-of-way. By 1977, they had given the Southern Maryland Electric Company a lease allowing overhead electric lines and started planning to use part of the ROW to Part of the ROW was used to widen MD-5/MD-235. Two years later they created the Hughesville-Lexington Park Railway Corridor Commission to implement the recommendations from that study, including building a railtrail along it.

Talk of constructing a hiking/biking trail on the railroad right-of-way started almost immediately, but planning for the trail wouldn't start for 30 years. In 1998, the state led the Hughesville to Lexington Park Right-of-Way Preservation Study to decided what to do with the right-of-way and determined that the right-of-way should be preserved for future light rail or rapid transit usage, perhaps as far as 50 years into the future.

Construction of the trail started in 2005 and Phase I, running one mile from MD Route 236 in New Market, MD to the Northern County Senior Center in Charlotte Hall, was officially opened on June 3, 2006. Phase II, from the Northern County Senior Center to Deborah Drive just inside Charles County opened in October, 2008. Work on Phase V, a disconnected section in south Mechanicsville from Baggett Park to near MD Route 5, broke ground in 2010 and was complete in the spring of 2011. Phase VI, at first delayed due to a conflict about how it would pass through the property of Immaculate Conception Church, was completed in 2016. This section passes through Mechanicsville and closed the gap between Phase I and Phase V.

Phase III, a 2-mile long section from Chancellors Run/MD-237 in California, MD to FDR Boulevard in Wildewood, MD has been partially constructed in pieces by developers. The central piece, stretching about 950 feet north from Old Rolling Road, was built in 2005 as part of the adjacent South Plaza Shopping Center. The northernmost piece, from FDR Boulevard to the driveway of the electrical power substation about 750 feet south along Three Notch Road/MD-235, was built around 2010 as part of the nearby Sturbridge Homes project. And the southernmost piece, which is the longest one at ~3400 feet long, runs north from Chancellors Run Road to a dead-end near 45440 Miramar Way. It was also built around 2010.

Phase IV-B, a 1.8 mile section from Pegg Road in Lexington Park to MD-237 in California is being built as part of Phase 3 of the FDR Boulevard Project. Phase 3A of that project, from MD 237 to Buck Hewitt Rd was completed on November 14, 2023. Work on Phase 3b, from Pegg Road to Buck Hewitt started in 2024 and is expected to be completed in fall of 2026.

In 2018, Maryland Governor Larry Hogan's administration awarded St. Mary's County $4.1 million from two separate state and federal grant programs for the construction of phase VII - the 3.3 mile section from FDR Boulevard in California to Rescue Lane in Hollywood, MD. In September 2023, Maryland Governor Wes Moore announced $1.2 million in additional funds for phase VII, as part of the Kim Lamphier Bikeways Network Program by the Maryland Department of Transportation. In December 2023, the St. Mary's County Commission approved matching funds for the grants that would allow work from the water tower at 24501 Three Notch Road in Hollywood to the Sturbridge Apartments section just south of FDR Boulevard. The project was to go out to bid in late 2025.

Trail sections from John V. Baggett Park to South Sandgates Road, and from Rescue Lane to FDR Boulevard will be built off of the right-of-way, because there the right-of-way is used for the southbound lanes of MD-235. Originally the county planned to acquire additional land to replace the railroad property taken in order to maintain the linear continuity of the trail, but the delay in building those sections seems to indicate they did not.

Phases XIV and IX are still to be completed.
