= Jug Bay Wetlands Sanctuary =

Wildlife sanctuary in southern Maryland, US

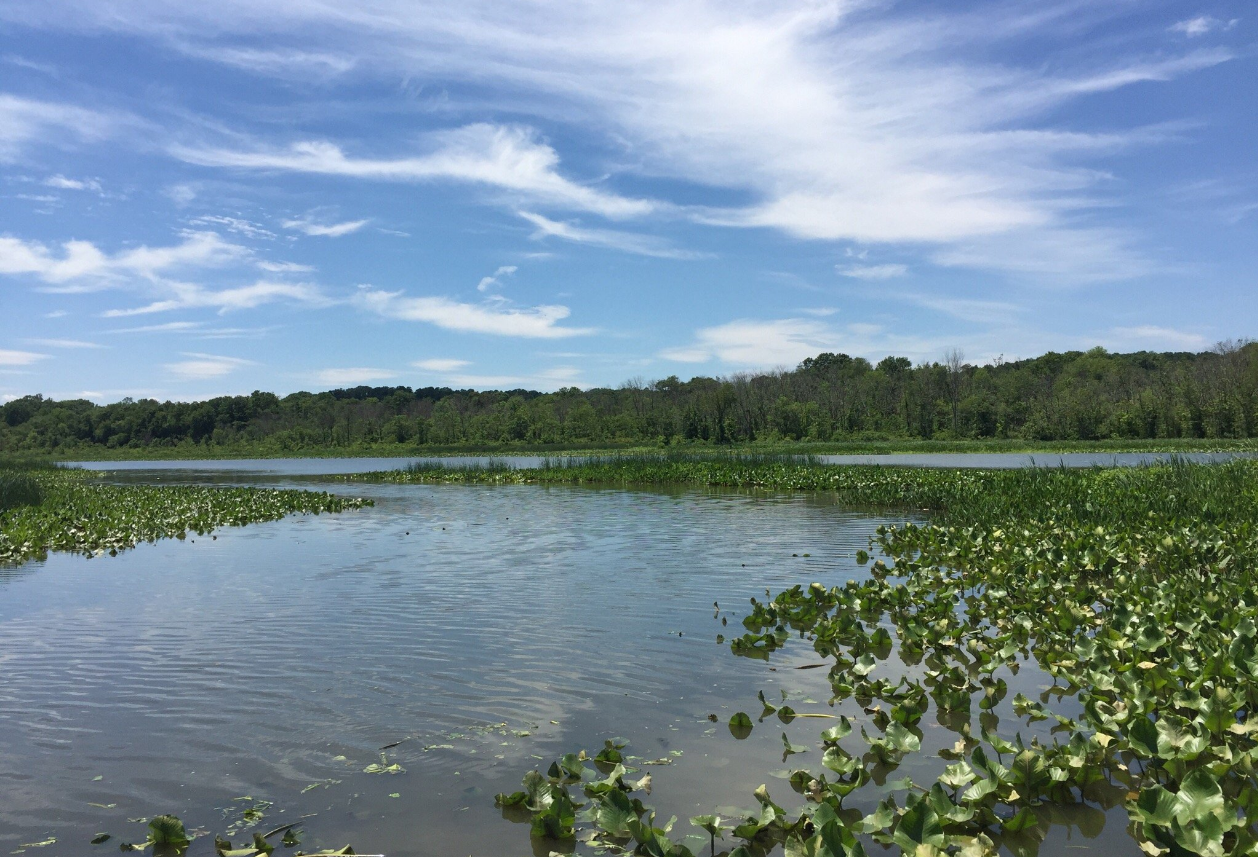
- Merged into: It became part of the Chesapeake Bay National Estuarine Research Reserve System in 1990
- Purpose: It provides environmental education opportunities to the public, it conducts ecological research, and it conserves Jug Bay's unique ecosystem.
- Location: Bristol, Maryland

The Jug Bay Wetlands Sanctuary is located along the tidal Patuxent River in southern Maryland, United States. It was established in 1985 and is operated by the Anne Arundel County Department of Recreation and Parks. It includes more than 1,700 acres (6.9 km^{2}) of tidal freshwater wetlands, forests, meadows and fields. The wetlands, with large stands of aquatic plants including wild rice, are home to many birds, fish, reptiles, amphibians, and mammals. Miles of trails and boardwalks traverse a variety of habitats and provide glimpses into the rich history of the region. Notably, archaeologists have uncovered evidence of a large Native American settlement at Jug Bay which spanned 2 miles along the Patuxent, with the oldest arrowhead-like artifact dated between 8,000 and 8,900 years old.

In 1990, the Sanctuary became a component of the Chesapeake Bay National Estuarine Research Reserve System. The sanctuary is also recognized as a Nationally Important Bird Area by the American Bird Conservancy and the National Audubon Society. Jug Bay is located within the Atlantic Flyway and is a haven for more than 100 species of birds, including native and migratory waterfowl, songbirds, and raptors.

The goals of the sanctuary are to provide environmental education opportunities to the public, to conduct ecological research, and to conserve Jug Bay's unique ecosystem. Several hundred volunteers act as docents and guides to the public and assist with long-term ecological studies.

The sanctuary is located in Bristol, Maryland, 43 miles (69 km) from the mouth of the 115-mile (185 km) long river. The Wetlands Center is at 38°47′05″N 76°42′06″W, three miles (5 km) southeast of Upper Marlboro and six miles (10 km) west of Lothian, with a mailing address of 1361 Wrighton Road, Lothian, MD 20711. It is 17.5 miles (28.2 km) southwest of Annapolis and 19.5 miles (31.4 km) southeast of Washington, DC.

== McCann Wetlands Study Center ==
The McCann Wetlands Study Center houses interactive exhibits about wetlands, estuaries and the Patuxent River watershed, focusing on their importance and health, as well as the plants and animals that live there. The center also contains classroom lab facilities and a gift shop.

== The Friends of Jug Bay ==
The Friends of Jug Bay is a non-profit organization, incorporated in 1986, to support and promote the sanctuary. They foster activities that increase public appreciation of the natural environment of Jug Bay and the Patuxent River. The Friends receive funds from membership dues, donations, grants, fundraisers, and the sale of merchandise. There are over 400 member families. Some of the projects and activities supported by the Friends include research fellowships, summer camp scholarships and junior counselors, hospitality support, staff development, scientific and education equipment and materials, and other special projects.
