= Wilson =

Wilson may refer to:

== People ==
- Wilson (name)
  - List of people with given name Wilson
  - List of people with surname Wilson
- Wilson (footballer, born 1927), Brazilian manager and defender Wilson Francisco Alves (1927–1998)
- Wilson (footballer, born 1975), Brazilian centre-back Wilson Roberto dos Santos
- Wilson (footballer, born 1984), Brazilian goalkeeper Wilson Rodrigues de Moura Júnior
- Wilson (footballer, born 1985), Brazilian forward Wilson Rodrigues Fonseca

== Places ==
=== Australia ===
- Wilson, South Australia
- Wilson, Western Australia
- Wilson Inlet, Western Australia
- Wilson Reef, Queensland
- Wilsons Promontory, Victoria, Australia, and hence:

- Wilsons Promontory Islands Important Bird Area
- Wilsons Promontory Lighthouse
- Wilsons Promontory Marine National Park
- Wilsons Promontory National Park

=== Canada ===
- Wilson Avenue (Toronto), Ontario
  - Wilson (TTC) subway station
  - Wilson Subway Yard

=== Poland ===
- Wilson Square (Plac Wilsona), in Warsaw

=== United Kingdom ===
- Wilson, Leicestershire
- The Wilson (Cheltenham), Gloucestershire

=== United States ===
- Wilson, Arkansas
- Wilson, Pope County, Arkansas, an unincorporated community
- The Wilson (Indianapolis, Indiana), listed on the NRHP in Indiana
- Wilson, Kansas
- Wilson, Louisiana
- Wilson (town), New York
  - Wilson (village), New York, in the town
- Wilson, Garrett County, Maryland
- Wilson, North Carolina
- Wilson, Ohio
- Wilson, Oklahoma
- Wilson, Okmulgee County, Oklahoma, an unincorporated community
- Wilson, Pennsylvania
- Wilson, South Carolina
- Wilson, Texas
- Wilson, Comanche County, Texas, an unincorporated community
- Wilson, Kaufman County, Texas, an unincorporated community
- Wilson, Utah, a former unincorporated community
- Wilson, Wisconsin (disambiguation), several places
- Wilson, Wyoming
- Wilson Avenue (BMT Canarsie Line) subway station in New York City
- Mouth of Wilson, Virginia
- Mount Wilson, California

=== Lists of places with Wilson in the name ===
- Lake Wilson (disambiguation)
- List of peaks named Mount Wilson
- Wilson County (disambiguation)
- Wilson Township (disambiguation)

== Science ==
=== Botany and zoology ===
- Wilson's bird-of-paradise
- Wilson's magnolia (Magnolia wilsonii)
- Wilson's phalarope
- Wilson's plover
- Wilson's snipe
- Wilson's spiny mouse
- Wilson's storm petrel
- Wilson's warbler

=== Medicine ===
- Wilson's disease, a hereditary disease characterized by the accumulation of copper in tissue
- Wilson's temperature syndrome, a contested form of thyroid deficiency in alternative medicine circles

=== Physics ===
- Wilson action, lattice discretization of gauge fields
- Wilson loop, loop operator in quantum field theory

=== Geology ===
- Wilson Cycle, Geophysical model of the opening and closing of rifts

== Companies ==
- Wilson (company), Norwegian shipping company
- Wilson Combat, American firearms company
- Wilson's (Mint Cake), one of three companies that manufacture Kendal mint cake
- Wilson Parking, Hong Kong–based car parking management company
- Wilson Security, Australian private security company
- Wilson Sporting Goods, American sports equipment manufacturer
- H. J. Wilson Co., aka Wilson's, a defunct catalog showroom chain
- O. G. Wilson, a defunct catalog showroom chain owned by Zale Corporation
- Wilson's (department store), a department store in Massachusetts
- Wilson's Leather

== Fictional characters ==
- David "Pudd'nhead" Wilson, from the novel Pudd'nhead Wilson by Mark Twain
- Sergeant Arthur Wilson, from the TV show Dad's Army
- Wilson (Home Improvement), from the TV show Home Improvement
- James Wilson (House), from the TV show House
- George Everett Wilson, from the comic strip Dennis the Menace
- Wilson the Wonder Athlete, from the British story papers and comics published by D.C. Thomson & Co.
- Wilson the Volleyball, from the film Cast Away
- Wilson, king in the Gamehendge saga by the rock band Phish
- Wilson, a red diesel engine from the TV series Chuggington
- Wilson, the main character from the video game Don't Starve
- Wilson, the dog of Jim in Friday Night Dinner
- The Wilson family in The Amazing World of Gumball

== Other uses ==
- Wilson (1944 film), a biographical film about Woodrow Wilson
- Wilson (2017 film), a film directed by Craig Johnson, based on Daniel Clowes's graphic novel
- Wilson (band), an American rock band
- Wilson (book), a 2013 biography of Woodrow Wilson by A. Scott Berg
- Wilson (comics), a 2010 graphic novel by Daniel Clowes
- Wilson (crater), a lunar crater
- "Wilson" (House episode), a television episode
- "Wilson (Expensive Mistakes)", a song by Fall Out Boy
- Wilson gearbox, or preselector gearbox
- Wilson Ornithological Society, Michigan, United States
- Wilson's Hospital School, a boarding school in County Westmeath, Ireland
- Wilson's School, boys' grammar school in Wallington, London, UK
- Wilson, the nickname of the first deployment of The Ocean Cleanup
- Wilson score

== See also ==
- Justice Wilson (disambiguation)
- Willson (disambiguation)
- Wilson Building (disambiguation)
- Wilson College (disambiguation)
- Wilson Creek (disambiguation)
- Wilson Lake (disambiguation)
- Wilsonville (disambiguation)
- Wilson's theorem in mathematics
- Wilsun, 1927 German passenger ferry
