= Wilson, Maryland =

Wilson, Maryland may refer to the following places in Maryland:

- Wilson-Conococheague, Maryland, a census-designated place
- Wilson, Calvert County, Maryland, an unincorporated community
- Wilson (ghost town), Calvert County, Maryland
- Wilson, Garrett County, Maryland, an unincorporated community
- Wilson, Maryland and West Virginia, an unincorporated community in Garrett County
