= Wilson Creek =

Wilson Creek, Wilson's Creek or Wilsons Creek may refer to:

In Australia:

- Wilsons Creek (New South Wales)
- Wilson Creek (Northern Territory)
- Wilson Creek (Tasmania)
- Wilson Creek (Victoria)
- Wilson Creek (Western Australia)

In Canada:

- Wilson Creek (Siocan), a creek feeding Slocan Lake, British Columbia
- Wilson Creek, British Columbia, a community in Sechelt on the Sunshine Coast, British Columbia

In the United States:

- Wilson Creek (Humboldt County), California
- Wilson Creek (Temecula Creek tributary), a stream in Riverside County, California
- Wilson Creek (Ohio River tributary), a stream in Indiana
- Wilsons Creek (Missouri), a waterway near Springfield, Missouri
  - Battle of Wilson's Creek, an American Civil War Battle
  - Wilson's Creek National Battlefield
- Wilson Creek (Nevada)
- Wilson Creek (North Carolina)
- Wilson Creek (Trent River tributary), a stream in Craven County, North Carolina
- Wilson Creek (Texas)
- Wilson Creek (Clinton County, Ohio)
- Wilson Creek (Lackawanna River)
- Wilson Creek, Washington, a town in Grant County
- Wilson Creek (Wisconsin), a stream in Sauk County
