= Judge Wilson =

Judge Wilson may refer to:

- Billy Roy Wilson (born 1939), judge of the United States District Court for the Eastern District of Arkansas
- Charles R. Wilson (judge) (born 1954), judge of the United States Court of Appeals for the Eleventh Circuit
- Cory T. Wilson (born 1970), judge of the United States Court of Appeals for the Fifth Circuit
- David John Wilson (1887–1976), judge of the United States Customs Court
- Frank Wiley Wilson (1917–1982), judge of the United States District Court for the Eastern District of Tennessee
- James Clifton Wilson (1874–1951), judge of the United States District Court for the Northern District of Texas
- Jennifer P. Wilson (born 1975), judge of the United States District Court for the Middle District of Pennsylvania
- Samuel Grayson Wilson (born 1949), judge of the United States District Court for the Western District of Virginia
- Scott Wilson (judge) (1870–1942), judge of the United States Court of Appeals for the First Circuit
- Sarah L. Wilson (born 1959), judge of the United States Court of Federal Claims
- Stephen Victor Wilson (born 1941), judge of the United States District Court for the Central District of California

== See also ==
- Hiram V. Willson (1808–1866), judge of the United States District Court for the Northern District of Ohio
- Joseph Putnam Willson (1902–1998), judge of the United States District Court for the Western District of Pennsylvania
- Justice Wilson (disambiguation)
