= Stoakley, Maryland =

Unincorporated community in Maryland, U.S.

Coordinates: 38°33′30″N 76°35′51″W

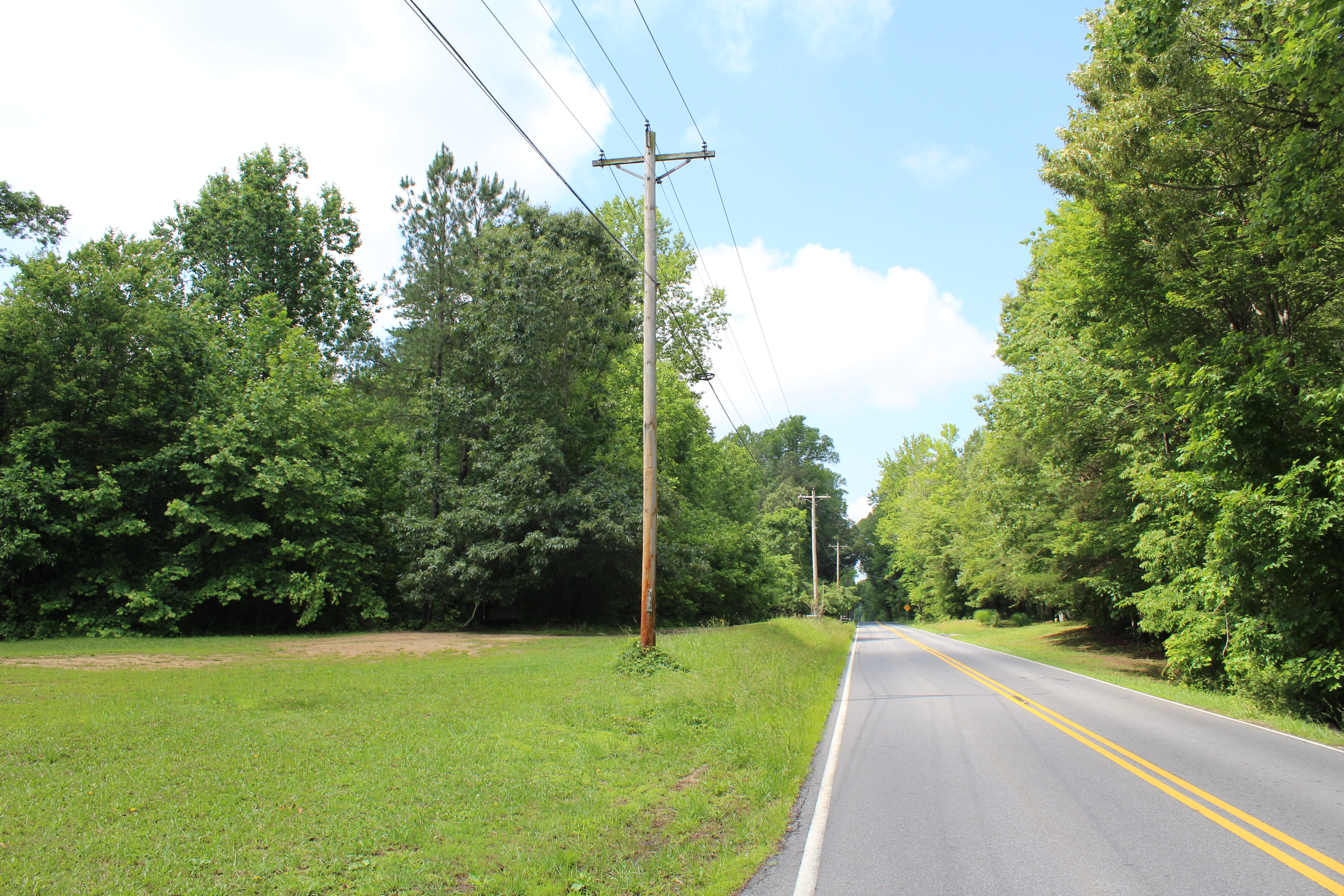
Stoakley Road westbound, heading towards the Patuxent River

Stoakley is an unincorporated community located in Calvert County, Maryland, United States. It is generally considered part of Prince Frederick and utilizes the Prince Frederick zip code.
