= Calvert County, Maryland =

County in Maryland, United States

- County
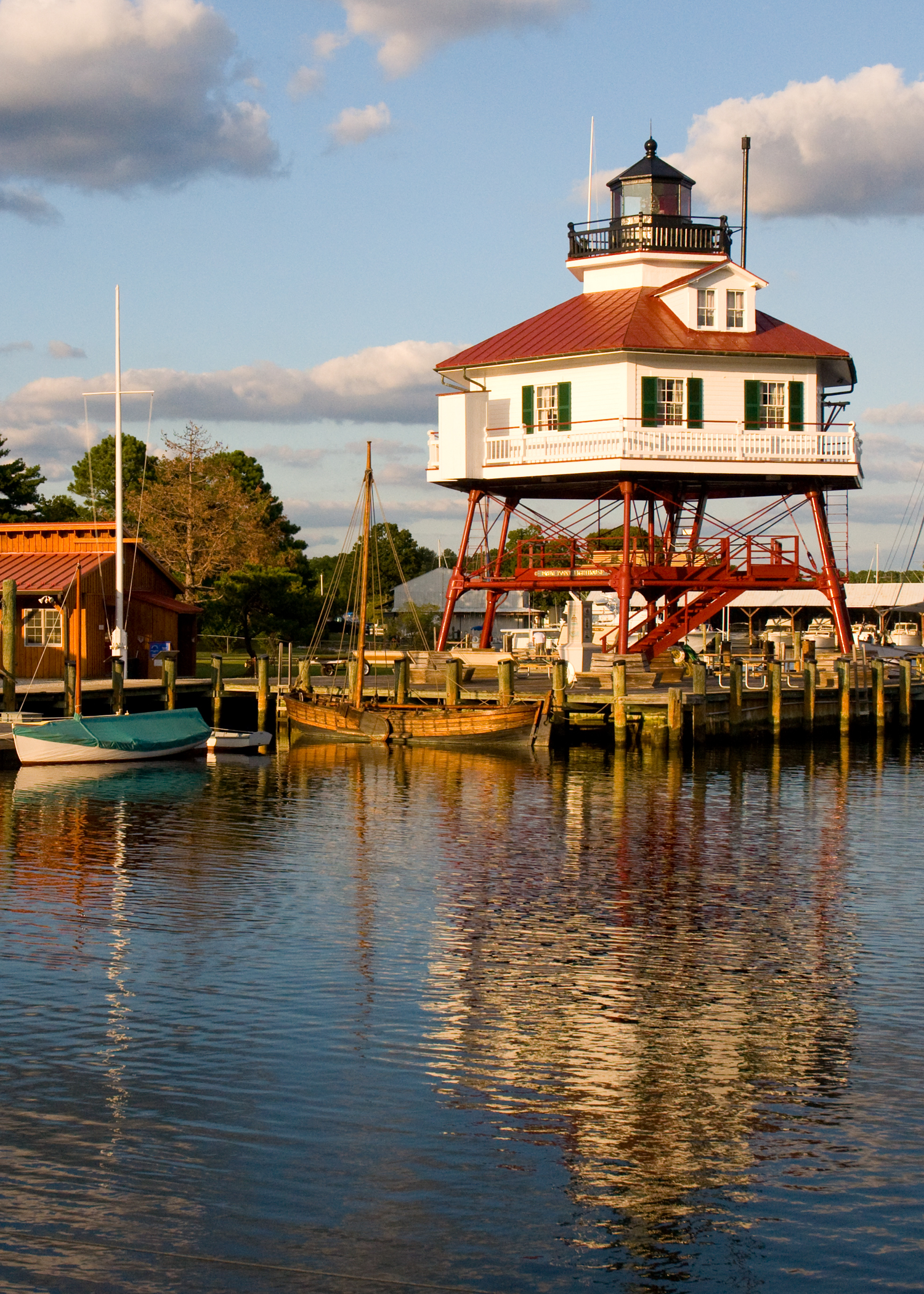
- Drum Point Light

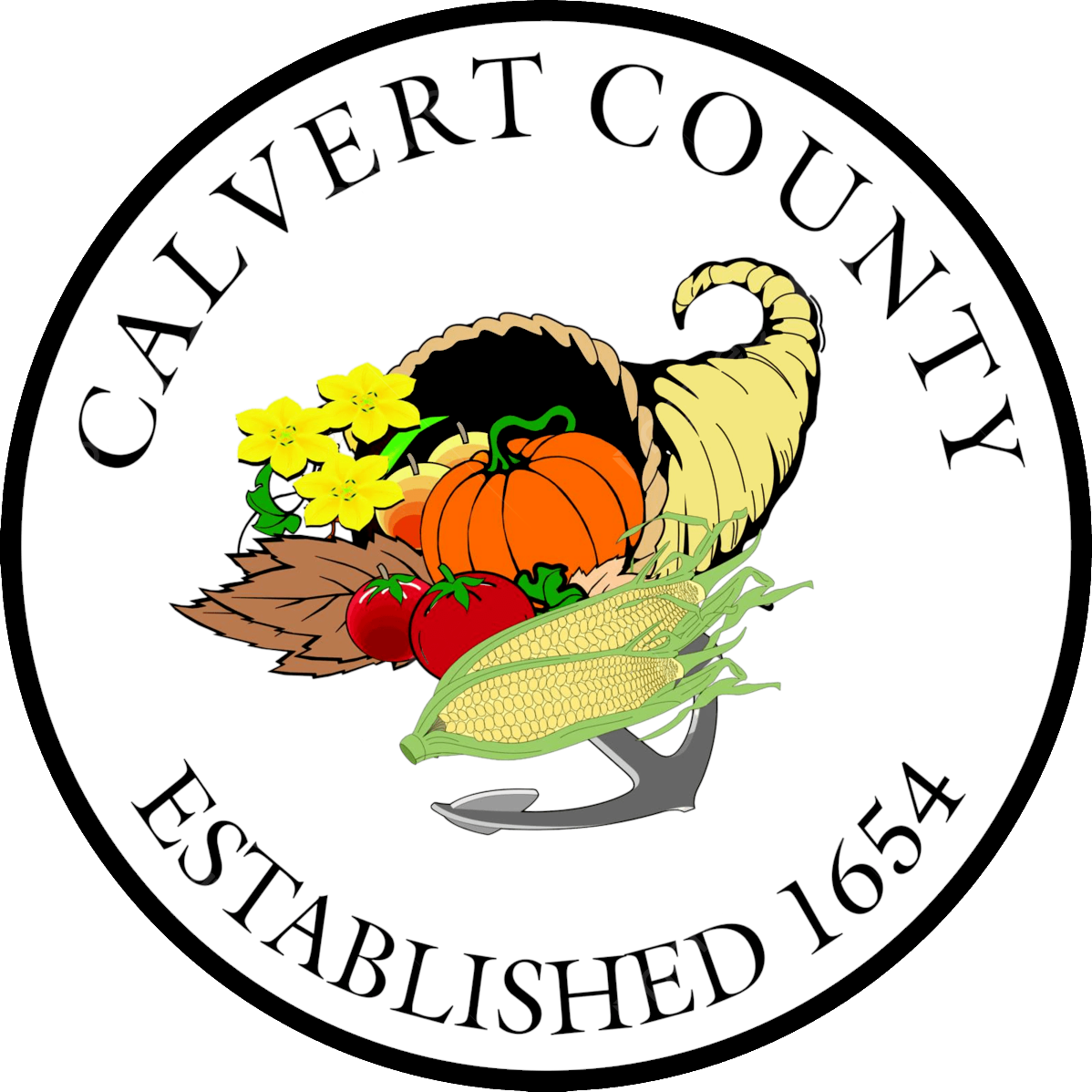
- Flag Seal

- Location within the U.S. state of Maryland
- Coordinates: 38.53°N 76.53°W
- Country: United States
- State: Maryland
- Founded: 1654
- Named for: Calvert family
- Seat: Prince Frederick
- Largest town: Chesapeake Beach

Area
  - Total: 345 sq mi (890 km^{2})
  - Land: 213 sq mi (550 km^{2})
  - Water: 132 sq mi (340 km^{2}) 38%

Population (2020)
  - Total: 92,783
  - Estimate (2025): 94,484 ▲
  - Density: 435.6/sq mi (168.2/km^{2})
- Time zone: UTC−5 (Eastern)
  - Summer (DST): UTC−4 (EDT)
- Congressional district: 5th
- Website: www.calvertcountymd.gov

Calvert County is a county located in the U.S. state of Maryland. As of the 2020 United States census, its population was 92,783. Its county seat is Prince Frederick. The county's name is derived from the family name of the Barons of Baltimore, the proprietors of the English Colony of Maryland. Calvert County is included in the Washington–Arlington–Alexandria metropolitan statistical area. It occupies the Calvert Peninsula, which is bordered on the east by the Chesapeake Bay and on the west by the Patuxent River. The county has one of the highest median household incomes in the United States. It is one of the older counties in Maryland, after St. Mary's, Kent, and Anne Arundel counties. The county is part of the Southern Maryland region of the state.

== History ==
=== Early history ===
In 1608, Captain John Smith was the first European to sail past what is now Calvert County while exploring the western shore of the Chesapeake Bay. On his map, he accurately represented the Patuxent River, as well as several Native-American villages. The area was described as wooded and had been occupied by the Patuxent people, who were overall peaceful to the early Europeans. Their diet was composed of fish from the river and corn cultivated in man-made clearings with a supplement of game from the forests. These clearings were very desirable, and conflict occurred when the settlers attempted to seize these areas from the Native Americans. Leonard Calvert, the first governor of Maryland, organized troops of armed men in 1639 to protect the settlers.

The first written mention of European settlers on the northern shore of the Patuxent River is found in the records of the Maryland Assembly in 1642. A Henry Bishop "stood up in the Assembly and exhibited himself as a Burgess of St. Leonard's and pleaded that it be acknowledged as a Hundred" near St. Leonard's Creek. This shows that European settlement along the river and its tributaries had been taking place for several years already.

By 1646, the colonists had spread all along the Patuxent River and along the bay side of Calvert County. Most of the transportation of goods and people took place on the water, as the land was occupied by dense forests. Large creeks were navigated by sailing boats, and plantations used their wharves to ship goods. Ferry services were set up to cross the river and the bay, with rates fixed by law.

=== Creation of Charles County ===
The county was originally named Charles County (much larger and unrelated to the present-day Charles County) in 1650 when Cecil Calvert, 2nd Baron Baltimore established it with Robert Brooke as its "commander". It was named after Charles I of England. At the time, the new county included the current area of Calvert County, as well as the southern and western shores of the Patuxent River up to its headwaters. The county seat was called Calverton (sometimes called Battle Town) and was located on the north shore at the mouth of Battle Creek until 1725. In 1658, the county was renamed Calvert County. It also included all of Prince George's County and parts of Montgomery County.

Puritans coming from Virginia had settled in Anne Arundel County and overflowed into Calvert County. All new settlers in Maryland were required to take an oath of allegiance to Lord Baltimore per the "Conditions of Plantation". This was a major point of tension between the Puritan settlers and Lord Baltimore. The civil war was ongoing in Britain, where the Puritans had gained control. Oliver Cromwell dismissed Parliament there and assumed the role of Lord Protector. In 1652, he sent a force of 750 men to subdue the plantations of the Chesapeake Bay under the new government. Virginia and Maryland surrendered to the Puritans and Robert Brooke cooperated with the Puritans.

On July 3, 1654, Lord Baltimore abolished Charles County and removed all authority from Brooke. He re-established the county as Calvert County with the same territory, but the Puritan Assembly was in power and changed the name to Patuxent County on October 20, 1654, after the Patuxent River and to remove any connection with the Calvert family. The county kept this name under the Puritan regime until 1658, when the name of Calvert County was restored.

According to the local "Trail of Souls Project", in 1860, 4,609 enslaved people and 1,841 free people of color lived there, with a total county population around 10,000 people.

Once made up primarily of farms and tobacco fields, the county's agriculture transformed in the mid-1990s. The prices for tobacco were declining. The State of Maryland instituted a tobacco buyout program, which offered farmers to transition to different crops and away from tobacco; 195 contracts were signed between Calvert County farmers and property owners and the Southern Maryland Agricultural Development Commission. The funds were used for infrastructure and equipment upgrades. Today, the county produces fruits, vegetables, and meat, as well as other crops.

The county has become a fast-growing exurban neighbor of Washington, D.C. Many home prices have nearly quadrupled in the past decade, with many four-bedroom homes in the northern half of the county costing over $1,000,000. The popular weekend resort towns of Solomons, Chesapeake Beach, and North Beach are notable.

The county has numerous properties on the National Register of Historic Places.

== Politics and government ==
=== County government ===
Calvert County is governed by a board composed of five elected county commissioners, the traditional form of county government in Maryland. They meet in Prince Frederick, the county seat.

Board of County Commissioners
Position	Name	Affiliation	District
President	Earl "Buddy" Hance	Republican	At-large
Vice President	Mike Hart	Republican	1
Commissioner	Catherine Grasso	Republican	3
Commissioner	Todd Ireland	Republican	At-large
Commissioner	Mark Cox	Republican	2

=== Emergency services ===
Calvert County fire, rescue, and EMS stations include:

- Co. 1 - North Beach Volunteer Fire Department
- Co. 2 - Prince Frederick Volunteer Fire Department
- Co. 3 - Solomons Volunteer Rescue Squad and Fire Department
- Co. 4 - Prince Frederick Volunteer Rescue Squad
- Co.5 - Dunkirk Volunteer Fire Department and Rescue Squad
- Co. 6 - Huntingtown Volunteer Fire Department and Rescue Squad
- Co. 7 - St. Leonard Volunteer Fire Department and Rescue Squad
- Co. 10 - Calvert Advanced Life Support
- Co. 12 - Calvert Rescue Dive Team

Until 2018, Calvert County was the only county in Maryland that still had a 100% all-volunteer fire, rescue, and EMS service. On January 20, 2018, the Calvert County Board of County Commissioners approved a phased-in approach of hiring paramedics, starting in fiscal year 2019.

The county also maintains a sheriff's office. The Calvert County Sheriff's Office was established in 1654, and is the primary law enforcement agency for Calvert County. The current sheriff is Ricky Cox. The agency is supported by the Maryland State Police and Maryland Natural Resources Police.

=== National politics ===
United States presidential election results for Calvert County, Maryland
Year	Republican		Democratic		Third party(ies)	
Year	No.	%	No.	%	No.	%
1892	1,153	53.31%	942	43.55%	68	3.14%
1896	1,294	57.95%	881	39.45%	58	2.60%
1900	1,414	60.97%	865	37.30%	40	1.72%
1904	1,030	57.48%	740	41.29%	22	1.23%
1908	1,070	59.02%	714	39.38%	29	1.60%
1912	1,035	58.38%	616	34.74%	122	6.88%
1916	975	49.82%	910	46.50%	72	3.68%
1920	1,741	58.01%	1,230	40.99%	30	1.00%
1924	1,564	54.06%	1,242	42.93%	87	3.01%
1928	2,085	63.92%	1,144	35.07%	33	1.01%
1932	1,838	51.38%	1,696	47.41%	43	1.20%
1936	2,082	52.32%	1,872	47.05%	25	0.63%
1940	2,067	48.68%	2,149	50.61%	30	0.71%
1944	2,184	58.51%	1,549	41.49%	0	0.00%
1948	1,919	50.43%	1,851	48.65%	35	0.92%
1952	2,769	55.25%	2,209	44.07%	34	0.68%
1956	2,764	58.44%	1,966	41.56%	0	0.00%
1960	2,173	46.16%	2,535	53.84%	0	0.00%
1964	1,765	34.61%	3,335	65.39%	0	0.00%
1968	1,946	35.71%	2,032	37.29%	1,471	27.00%
1972	4,024	63.43%	2,232	35.18%	88	1.39%
1976	3,439	42.64%	4,626	57.36%	0	0.00%
1980	5,440	50.05%	4,745	43.65%	685	6.30%
1984	8,303	59.99%	5,455	39.41%	82	0.59%
1988	10,956	62.98%	6,376	36.65%	65	0.37%
1992	10,026	43.12%	8,619	37.07%	4,604	19.80%
1996	11,509	48.84%	10,008	42.47%	2,049	8.69%
2000	16,004	53.69%	12,986	43.57%	816	2.74%
2004	23,017	58.49%	15,967	40.58%	367	0.93%
2008	23,095	52.42%	20,299	46.07%	663	1.50%
2012	23,952	52.62%	20,529	45.10%	1,037	2.28%
2016	26,176	55.21%	18,225	38.44%	3,007	6.34%
2020	25,346	51.61%	22,587	45.99%	1,179	2.40%
2024	29,361	54.18%	23,438	43.25%	1,392	2.57%

In the early 19th century, in the contests between the Hamiltonian Federalist and Jeffersonian Democratic-Republican parties of the First Party System, it backed the Federalists four out of seven times, only going for the Democratic-Republicans in their greatest landslides of 1804 and 1816, as well as the 1820 election in which President James Monroe ran effectively unopposed.

In the 1824 election, which began the second party system, the people of Calvert County voted for John Quincy Adams over Andrew Jackson, who went on to help found the Democratic Party before the 1828 election. Until the Civil War, Calvert County voted only for the candidates of the Whig Party, the Democrat's primary opposition. After that party's dissolution in the early 1850s, it supported the Nativist Know-Nothing party in 1856 and the largely Whiggish Constitutional Union party in 1860.

In the Civil War election of 1864, Calvert swung sharply along with the rest of southern Maryland to give over 90% of the vote to Democratic challenger George McClellan, and again to the Democratic standard-bearer Horatio Seymour four years later. The brief Democratic era was likely due to strong Confederate sympathy in southern Maryland.

In presidential elections, Calvert County has historically and at present leaned strongly towards the Republican Party. It was won by that party in every election from 1884 to 1936 – with the sequence broken in 1940 due to local support for Franklin Delano Roosevelt's efforts at helping Britain in World War II – and in modern times, no Democratic presidential nominee has won Calvert County since Jimmy Carter did so in 1976.

Since then, Calvert County has remained mostly aligned with the Republican Party. It briefly turned in favor of the Democrats in the dealigned 1960s and 70s, after which it became a Republican stronghold in the 1980s. In modern elections, it leans Republican though Democrats have gained votes. President Joe Biden came only 5% from winning the county in 2020, the closest any Democrat has come since Jimmy Carter carried it in 1976.

It is part of the 5th Congressional District, along with much of southern Maryland. The current representative is Democratic former House Majority Leader Steny Hoyer.

Voter registration and party enrollment as of March 2024
Republican	28,049	40.57%
Democratic	23,477	33.96%
Unaffiliated	16,404	23.73%
Libertarian	460	0.67%
Other parties	743	1.07%
Total	69,133	100%

== Geography ==
Washington–Arlington–Alexandria metropolitan statistical area

According to the U.S. Census Bureau, the county has a total area of 345 square miles (890 km^{2}), of which 132 square miles (340 km^{2}), or 38%, are covered by water. It is the smallest county in Maryland by land area and third-smallest by total area. The county also includes five islands: Solomons Island, Broomes Island, Buzzard Island, Hog Island, and Molly's Leg.

The county's coast along the Chesapeake Bay is a long, relatively smooth bight, a feature that is unique in the Chesapeake Bay.

=== Geology ===
A geological formation spanning across Maryland, Virginia, and Delaware is named after the county, the Calvert Formation. It is visible within the Calvert Cliffs State Park, where it is exposed in cliffs. Located on the western shore of the county, the Calvert Cliffs are famous for their fossil deposits and are a popular collecting location of marine vertebrates, shark teeth, and birds, as well as freshwater and marine turtles and tortoises. Some crocodile teeth have also been found, which indicates that they may have been nesting in the sands at the time the formation was created.

The county landscape is composed of three platforms – the Talbot Terrace, the Wicomico Terrace, and the Sunderland Terrace (also known as the Ridge). These terraces correspond to three periods where the water level rose and later fell, leaving sand deposits. The oldest was created during the Miocene age, when the entire county peninsula found itself underwater. Marine deposits, clay, and mud containing seashells and fossils were left behind, leading to the Calvert Cliffs seen today after the sea receded and the waves started eroding the deposit. These three terraces are visible in various parts of the county and are most obvious on the bay side where they rise to a height of 100 ft (30 m).

=== Climate ===
Calvert County lies in the humid subtropical climate zone (Cfa) in the Köppen climate classification, with hot, humid summers and mild to chilly winters with plentiful precipitation year-round. In the Trewartha climate classification, the county is classified as oceanic (Do) except in the extreme south, which is Cf. Its proximity to the Chesapeake Bay has a moderating effect on temperatures compared with locales further inland. Average monthly temperatures in Prince Frederick range from 35.9 °F (2.2 °C) in January to 77.9 °F (25.5 °C) in July.

=== Adjacent counties ===
- Anne Arundel County (north)
- Prince George's County (northwest)
- Charles County (west)
- Dorchester County (east)
- Talbot County (northeast)
- St. Mary's County (south)

== Demographics ==
Historical population
Census	Pop.	Note	%±
1790	8,652		—
1800	8,297		−4.1%
1810	8,005		−3.5%
1820	8,073		0.8%
1830	8,900		10.2%
1840	9,229		3.7%
1850	9,646		4.5%
1860	10,447		8.3%
1870	9,865		−5.6%
1880	10,538		6.8%
1890	9,860		−6.4%
1900	10,223		3.7%
1910	10,325		1.0%
1920	9,744		−5.6%
1930	9,528		−2.2%
1940	10,484		10.0%
1950	12,100		15.4%
1960	15,826		30.8%
1970	20,682		30.7%
1980	34,638		67.5%
1990	51,372		48.3%
2000	74,563		45.1%
2010	88,737		19.0%
2020	92,783		4.6%
2025 (est.)	94,484	▲	1.8%
U.S. Decennial Census; 1790–1960 1900–1990; 1990–2000 2010–2018

=== Racial and ethnic composition ===
Calvert County, Maryland – racial and ethnic composition Note: the US Census treats Hispanic/Latino as an ethnic category. This table excludes Latinos from the racial categories and assigns them to a separate category. Hispanics/Latinos may be of any race.
Race / ethnicity (NH = Non-Hispanic)	Pop 1980	Pop 1990	Pop 2000	Pop 2010	Pop 2020	% 1980	% 1990	% 2000	% 2010	% 2020
White alone (NH)	26,564	42,450	61,894	70,680	68,760	76.69%	82.63%	83.01%	79.65%	74.11%
Black or African American alone (NH)	7,641	8,002	9,728	11,816	11,922	22.06%	15.58%	13.05%	13.32%	12.85%
Native American or Alaska Native alone (NH)	45	122	214	280	207	0.13%	0.24%	0.29%	0.32%	0.22%
Asian alone (NH)	106	278	647	1,246	1,549	0.31%	0.54%	0.87%	1.40%	1.67%
Native Hawaiian or Pacific Islander alone (NH)	x	x	21	39	74	x	x	0.03%	0.04%	0.08%
Other race alone (NH)	22	18	73	105	406	0.06%	0.04%	0.10%	0.12%	0.44%
Mixed-race or multiracial (NH)	x	x	851	2,134	5,663	x	x	1.14%	2.40%	6.10%
Hispanic or Latino (any race)	260	502	1,135	2,437	4,202	0.75%	0.98%	1.52%	2.75%	4.53%
Total	34,638	51,372	74,563	88,737	92,783	100.00%	100.00%	100.00%	100.00%	100.00%

=== 2020 census ===
As of the 2020 census, the county had a population of 92,783, a median age of 40.9 years, and 23.6% of residents under the age of 18 while 15.9% were 65 years of age or older.

For every 100 females there were 96.5 males, and for every 100 females age 18 and over there were 94.1 males age 18 and over; 38.1% of residents lived in urban areas while 61.9% lived in rural areas.

The racial makeup of the county was 75.4% White, 13.0% Black or African American, 0.3% American Indian and Alaska Native, 1.7% Asian, 0.1% Native Hawaiian and Pacific Islander, 1.4% from some other race, and 8.1% from two or more races. Hispanic or Latino residents of any race comprised 4.5% of the population.

There were 32,754 households in the county, of which 35.8% had children under the age of 18 living with them and 21.3% had a female householder with no spouse or partner present. About 19.0% of all households were made up of individuals and 9.0% had someone living alone who was 65 years of age or older.

There were 35,663 housing units, of which 8.2% were vacant. Among occupied housing units, 83.6% were owner-occupied and 16.4% were renter-occupied. The homeowner vacancy rate was 1.7% and the rental vacancy rate was 6.2%.

=== 2010 census ===
As of the 2010 United States census, 88,737 people, 30,873 households, and 23,732 families were residing in the county. The population density was 416.3 inhabitants per square mile (160.7/km^{2}). The 33,780 housing units had an average density of 158.5 per square mile (61.2/km^{2}). The racial makeup of the county was 81.4% White, 13.4% Black or African American, 1.4% Asian, 0.4% American Indian, 0.7% from other races, and 2.7% from two or more races. Those of Hispanic or Latino origin made up 2.7% of the population. In terms of ancestry, 19.6% were German, 17.6% were Irish, 13.9% were English, 8.4% were Italian, and 7.4% were American.

Of the 30,873 households, 40.4% had children under 18 living with them, 60.6% were married couples living together, 11.3% had a female householder with no husband present, 23.1% were not families, and 18.1% of all households were made up of individuals. The average household size was 2.85 and the average family size was 3.23. The median age was 40.1 years.

The median income for a household in the county was $90,838 and for a family was $102,638. Males had a median income of $66,909 versus $49,337 for females. The per capita income for the county was $36,323. About 2.8% of families and 4.4% of the population were below the poverty line, including 5.3% of those under 18 and 5.3% of those 65 or over.

According to the 2010 census, the racial and ethnic make-up of the Calvert County population was 79.65% non-Hispanic Whites, 13.44% Blacks, 0.37% Native Americans, 1.42% Asians, 0.05% Pacific Islanders, 0.12% non-Hispanics reporting some other race, 2.40% non-Hispanics reporting multiple races, and 2.75% Hispanic.

=== 2000 census ===
As of the census of 2000, 74,563 people, 25,447 households, and 20,154 families resided in the county. The population density was 346 people per square mile (134 people/km^{2}). The 27,576 housing units had an average density of 128 per square mile (49/km^{2}). The racial makeup of the county was 83.93% White, 13.11% African American, 0.30% Native American, 0.88% Asian, 0.03% Pacific Islander, 0.49% from other races, and 1.27% from two or more races. About 1.52% of the population were Hispanics or Latinos of any race.

There were 25,447 households, out of which 41.70% had children under the age of 18 living with them, 64.80% were married couples living together, 9.90% had a female householder with no husband present, and 20.80% were non-families. 16.30% of all households were made up of individuals, and 5.70% had someone living alone who was 65 years of age or older. The average household size was 2.91 and the average family size was 3.26.

In the county, the age distribution was 29.6% under 18, 6.4% from 18 to 24, 31.7% from 25 to 44, 23.4% from 45 to 64, and 8.9% who were 65 or older. The median age was 36 years. For every 100 females, there were 97.3 males. For every 100 females 18 and over, there were 94.0 males.

The median income for a household in the county was $65,945, and for a family was $71,545 (these figures had risen to $88,989 and $100,229, respectively, as of a 2007 estimate). Males had a median income of $48,664 versus $32,265 for females. The per capita income for the county was $25,410. About 3.1% of families and 4.4% of the population were below the poverty line, including 5.1% of those under 18 and 5.7% of those 65 or over.

== Economy ==
Calvert Cliffs Nuclear Power Plant is located on the western shore of the Chesapeake Bay at Lusby, as is the Cove Point LNG Terminal.

The Chesapeake Biological Laboratory, part of the University of Maryland Center for Environmental Science, is located in Solomons.

A branch of the United States Naval Research Laboratory is located at Chesapeake Beach.

The Patuxent River Naval Air Station is located immediately to the south of Calvert County, in St. Mary's County.

=== Top employers ===
According to the county's 2019 Comprehensive Annual Financial Report, the top employers in the county are:

Rank	Employer	No. of employees
1	Calvert County Public Schools	2,147
2	Calvert County Government	1,269
3	Calvert Memorial Hospital	1,225
4	Constellation	822
5	Walmart	460
6	Giant Food	378
7	Arc of Southern Maryland	375
8	Chesapeake Beach Resort and Spa	239
9	Safeway	231

== Education ==
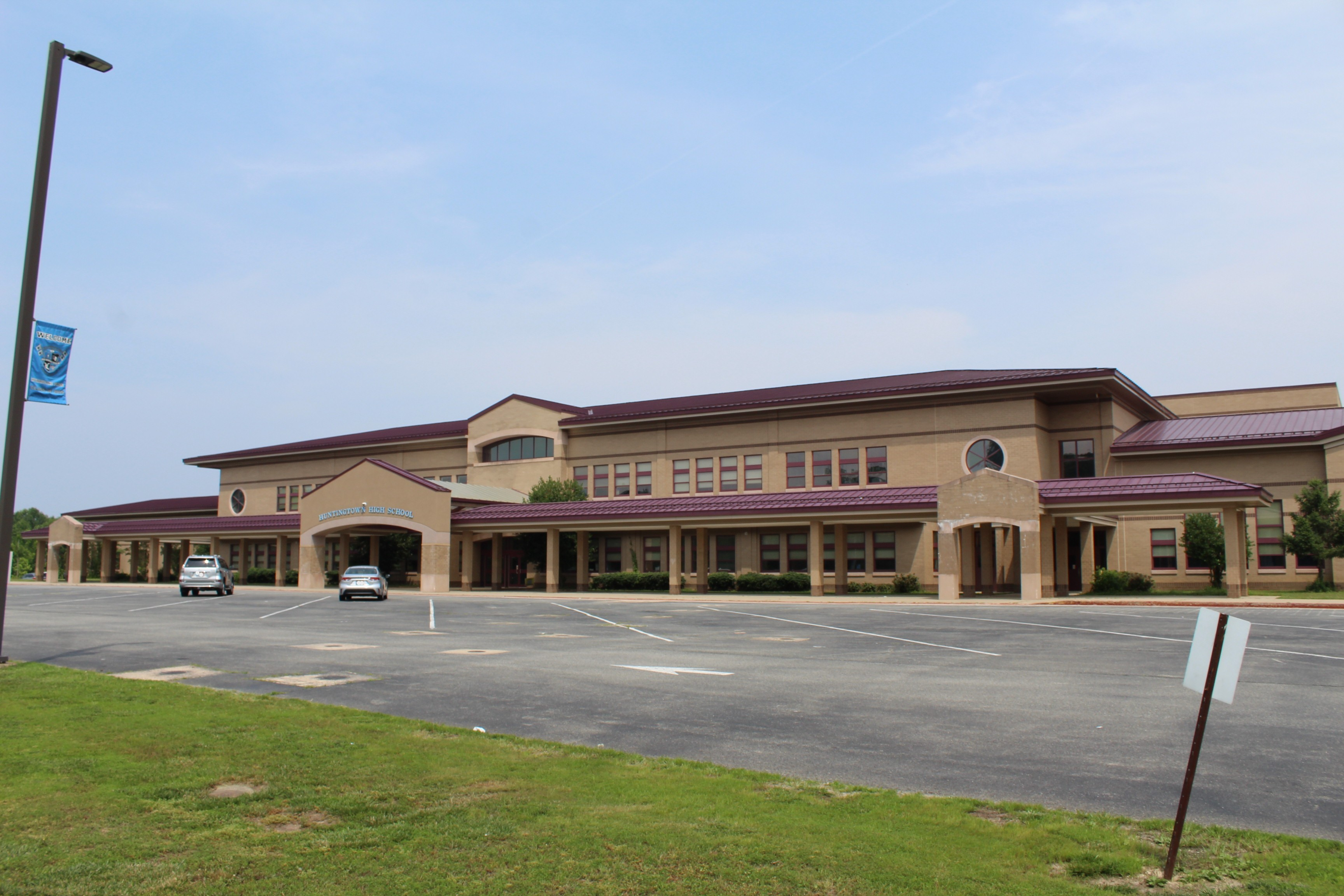
The entrance of Huntingtown High School in Huntingtown

Calvert County is served by Calvert County Public Schools. The county's education system consists of 13 elementary schools, six middle schools, four high schools, a vocational education center, and a variety of other facilities.

The Calverton School, a private school in Huntingtown, provides prekindergarten through grade 12 education. Additionally, a private Catholic prekindergarten through grade 8 school, Cardinal Hickey Academy, is located in Owings.

The College of Southern Maryland operates a campus in Prince Frederick and additional facilities in neighboring counties.

== Transportation ==
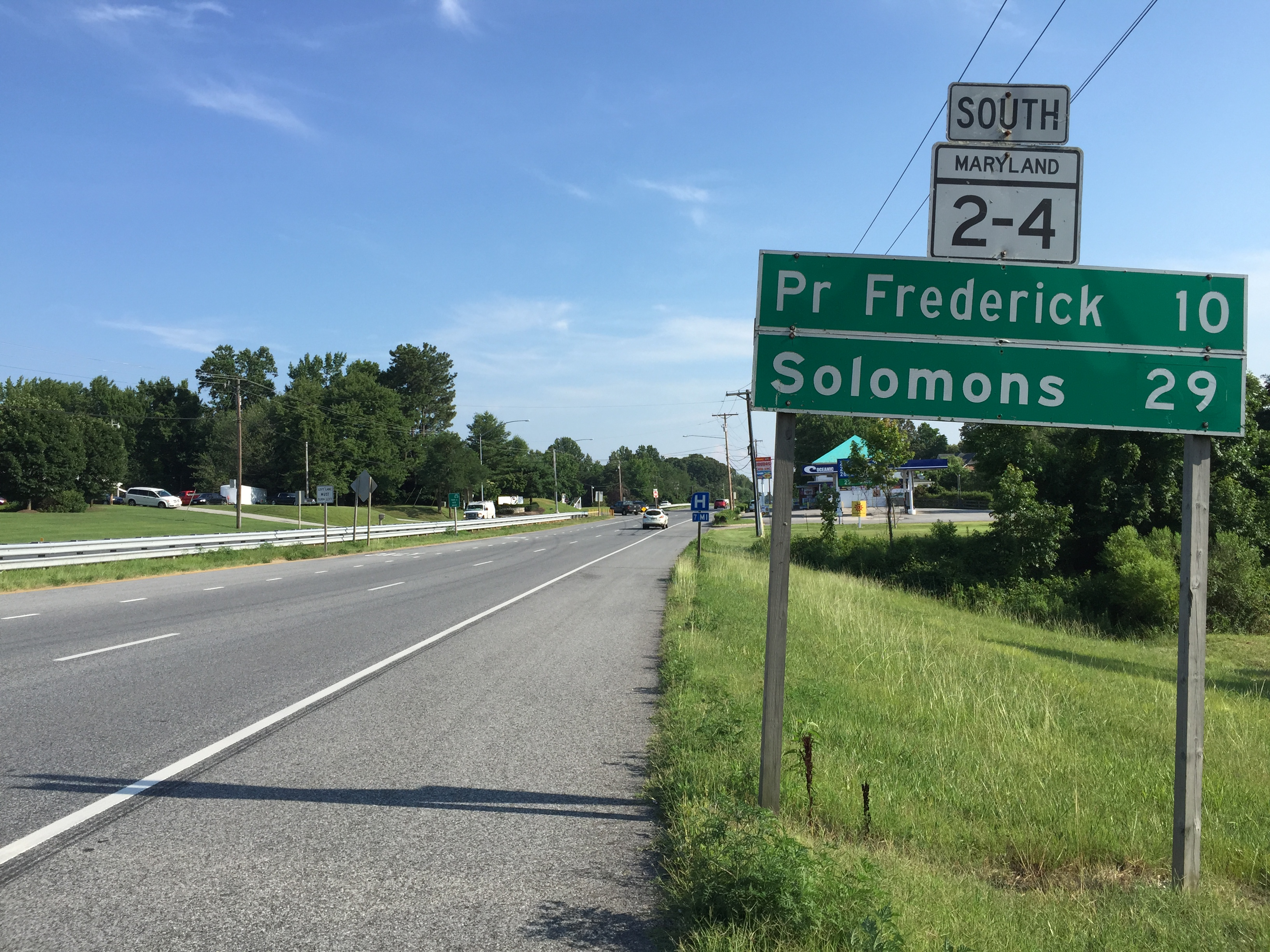
MD 2/MD 4 southbound in Calvert County

The main artery serving Calvert County is Maryland Route 4 (which begins in Washington, DC, as Pennsylvania Avenue before crossing into Prince George's County and Anne Arundel County, Maryland). Route 4 in Calvert County begins at the northern tip of the county at Lyons Creek, about 3 miles north of Dunkirk. At Sunderland, Route 4 meets Maryland Route 2 (traveling south as a two-lane road from Annapolis) and the two roads merge as Maryland Route 2–4. Route 2-4 continues south through Prince Frederick, St. Leonard, and Lusby. At Solomons, Routes 2 and 4 split again, with Route 2 heading towards downtown Solomons and Route 4 crossing the Patuxent River at the Governor Thomas Johnson Bridge into St. Mary's County.

Route 2-4 is designated Solomons Island Road throughout much of the county, with the section south of Prince Frederick being recently renamed Louis Goldstein Highway in memory of Louis L. Goldstein, the former comptroller of Maryland and Calvert County resident.

In the 1970s and 1980s, Route 2-4 underwent an extensive expansion project, with the formerly two-lane road becoming a four-lane dual highway. Certain portions of the highway were realigned, with the former roadway becoming Maryland Route 765. The final portion of the dualized Route 2-4 between St. Leonard and Solomons was completed in 1988. In 2009, a portion of Route 2–4 in Prince Frederick was expanded to three lanes, along with sidewalks added.

Other major roadways in Calvert County include:

- Maryland Route 231, which travels west from Prince Frederick to the Patuxent River, ultimately crossing the river at the Benedict Bridge into Charles County.
- Maryland Route 260, which starts at an overpass interchange at the Calvert-Anne Arundel border and travels southeast to Chesapeake Beach. A portion of Route 260 is a four-lane dual highway.

== Communities ==
=== Towns ===
- Chesapeake Beach
- North Beach

=== Census-designated places ===
The Census Bureau recognizes the following census-designated places in the county:

- Broomes Island
- Calvert Beach
- Chesapeake Ranch Estates
- Drum Point
- Dunkirk
- Huntingtown
- Long Beach
- Lusby
- Owings
- Prince Frederick (county seat)
- St. Leonard
- Solomons

Dunkirk, Huntingtown, Lusby, Owings, Prince Frederick, St. Leonard, and Solomons have all been designated by Calvert County government as being "town centers". The "town center" designation means while these communities may not have incorporated central governments, they do have specified boundaries surrounding the central business and residential areas for zoning purposes. The reason behind the "town center" designation is to cluster new development within established areas with existing infrastructure, thus discouraging urban sprawl. The implementation of the "town center" concept in Calvert County over the past two decades has for the most part been successful in preserving rural and agricultural areas outside the designated "town centers", and stands as a key example of the smart growth planning strategy.

=== Unincorporated communities ===
- Adelina
- Barstow
- Bowens
- Chaneyville
- Dares Beach
- Dowell
- Johnstown
- Lower Marlboro
- Mutual
- Parran
- Pleasant Valley
- Port Republic
- Scientists Cliffs
- Stoakley
- Sunderland
- Wallville
- Wilson

== Notable people ==
- Louisa Adams, First Lady of the United States, wife of President John Quincy Adams
- Charles Ball, an enslaved man famous for his epic journey to freedom, his service in the War of 1812, and his autobiography
- Harriet Elizabeth Brown, Calvert County schoolteacher, catalyst in education in Maryland and throughout the US for equal pay
- Judith Catchpole, an indentured servant who in 1656 was tried and acquitted of murdering her unborn child by one of the earliest all-female juries in the United States
- Brett Cecil, professional baseball pitcher for the Toronto Blue Jays and St. Louis Cardinals
- Cupid Childs, professional baseball player
- Tom Clancy, author
- Bernie Fowler, former Maryland state senator and Patuxent River advocate
- Jon Franklin, two-time Pulitzer winner and author
- Henry Gantt, mechanical engineer, popularized the Gantt chart in the 1910s
- Earl F. Hance, Calvert County commissioner and secretary of the Maryland Department of Agriculture
- Doug Hill, WJLA-TV weatherman
- Al Hunt, Bloomberg News executive editor
- Thomas Johnson, first elected governor of Maryland, Continental Congress delegate, associate justice of the Supreme Court of the United States
- Joseph Kent, U.S. senator, governor of Maryland
- Cliff Kincaid, investigative journalist with Accuracy in Media and American Survival, Inc.
- Robert McClain, pro football player for the Atlanta Falcons
- Thomas V. Miller Jr., Maryland Senate president
- J. C. Price, football coach
- Augustus Rhodes Sollers, congressman
- Arthur Storer, first astronomer in the American colonies, original namesake for Halley's Comet
- Roger Brooke Taney, chief justice of the United States, presided over the Dred Scott decision
- Margaret Taylor, First Lady of the United States, wife of President Zachary Taylor
- Robert Ulanowicz, theoretical ecologist
- Wax, rapper, singer, songwriter, musician, producer, and comedian
- Michael Willis, actor
- Judy Woodruff, news anchor and journalist

== In popular culture ==
Calvert County has been the setting for several movies and television programs. The opening scene of the 1993 Clint Eastwood movie In the Line of Fire was filmed at Flag Harbor Marina in St. Leonard. More recently, the Calvert County Sheriff's Department has been featured on several reality television programs, including Speeders on the truTV network, MTV's Busted, and A&E's Live PD.
