= Judith Catchpole =

Tried for witchcraft in 1656

Judith Catchpole, a young maidservant in colonial America, was tried in 1656 for witchcraft and infanticide before one of the earliest all-female juries in the Thirteen Colonies. According to popular belief, all-female juries did not occur until much later. The state of Wyoming claims the first all woman jury was empaneled in Laramie on March 7, 1870. Even after the Nineteenth Amendment to the U.S. Constitution was passed in 1920, not all states permitted all female juries.

Catchpole was an indentured servant in the colony of Maryland, arriving there by boat from the Commonwealth of England in January 1656. Upon her arrival she was accused of several crimes, resulting in a trial on September 22, 1656 in the General Provincial Court in Patuxent County, Maryland. This trial was the first to have an all-female jury in colonial Maryland and one of the earliest in colonial America.

== Circumstances ==
Catchpole was accused of murdering her child and of other bizarre acts, by the indentured servant of William Bramhall, a fellow passenger on the ship "Mary and Francis"; her accuser died after making the accusations. She was accused of killing her child, cutting the throat of a female passenger while the woman was asleep, and stabbing a seaman in the back. Before he died he made known his accusations to other passengers, stating that Catchpole had committed these acts while the other passengers were asleep. No other passengers substantiated these accusations, nor could any account for how Catchpole had hidden a pregnancy during the voyage and given birth on a small ship without others seeing evidence of this. Catchpole claimed she had never been pregnant.

It was decided that an all-female jury was needed because the issues of pregnancy and birth required female expertise. Composed of seven married women and four single women, the trial was ordered by the General Provincial Court at Patuxent for September 22, 1656. In order to determine if Catchpole had murdered her own infant, the jury was to inspect Catchpole's body to find evidence that she had been pregnant and given birth to a child. The jury inspected Catchpole's body and concluded that she had not recently given birth. Other witnesses gave testimony that the man making the accusations was "not in sound mind". Additional hearsay evidence was presented that the male accuser had spoken of witchcraft and told other bizarre stories. He had said that after slitting the woman's throat, she sewed it back up before the woman awoke, and that she rubbed grease on the back of the fatally wounded seaman and he came back to life.

The jury gave little credence to the charges of witchcraft, and seeing no evidence of childbirth, acquitted Catchpole of all charges.

== Significance ==
Judith Catchpole was tried before the first all-woman jury to serve in colonial Maryland. The judicial practices of common law in colonial America often arose from the need to accommodate to practical situations. In the case of Judith Catchpole, the expertise of women was needed to decide whether she had been pregnant and given birth to a child. In general however, women were not allowed to serve on juries in the United States, even after the Nineteenth Amendment was passed in 1920 giving women the right to vote.
