= Pleasant Valley, Calvert County, Maryland =

Unincorporated community in Maryland, U.S.

- Unincorporated community
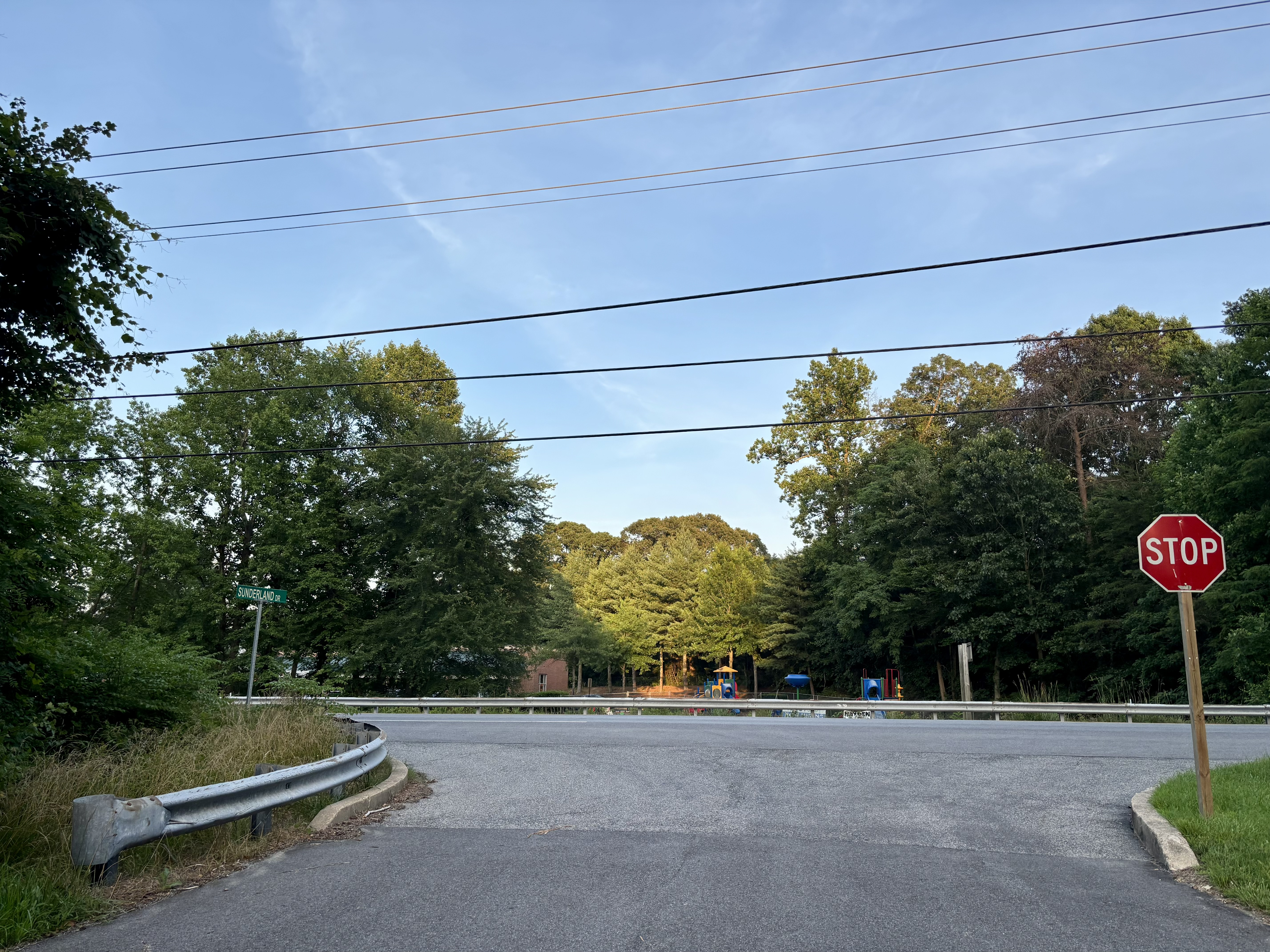
- Sunderland Drive facings Solomons Island Road North (Maryland Route 2)

- Location within Maryland Location within the United States
- Coordinates: 38°40′03″N 76°36′10″W
- Country: United States
- State: Maryland
- County: Calvert
- Time zone: UTC-5 (Eastern (EST))
  - Summer (DST): UTC-4 (EDT)

Pleasant Valley is an unincorporated community in Calvert County, Maryland, United States.
