= Earl F. Hance =

American politician

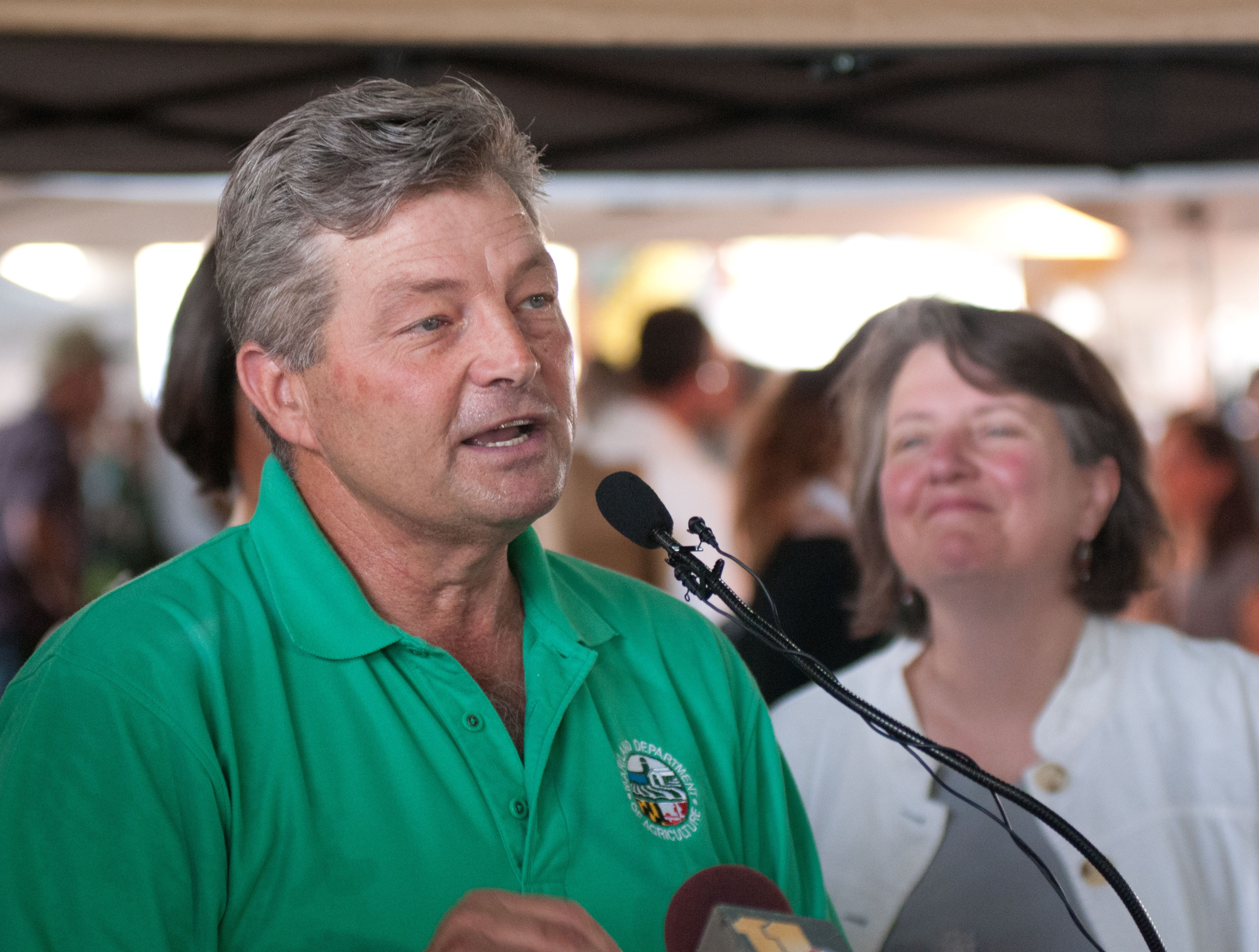
- Hance in 2012

President of the Calvert County Board of Commissioners
- Incumbent
- Assumed office December 15, 2020

Secretary of the Maryland Department of Agriculture
- In office May 2009 – January 2015
- Governor: Martin O'Malley
- Succeeded by: Joseph Bartenfelder

Personal details
- Born: July 17, 1955 Prince Frederick, Maryland, U.S.
- Party: Republican

Earl F. "Buddy" Hance (born July 17, 1955), is an American politician who served as Secretary of the Maryland Department of Agriculture in the Cabinet of Governor Martin O'Malley from May 2009 to January 2015, after serving as Deputy Secretary of the Maryland Department of Agriculture beginning in February 2007. Hance was elected to the Calvert County Board of Commissioners in 2018, and has been the president of the board since 2020.

== Early life ==
Hance was born in Prince Frederick, Maryland. He graduated from Calvert High School. In 1973, he joined the Prince Frederick Volunteer Fire Department.

== Career ==
From 2003 to 2007, Hance served as the President of the Maryland Farm Bureau. From 2004 to 2007, he served on the board of directors of the American Farm Bureau Federation. In February 2007, Hance was appointed Maryland's Deputy Secretary of Agriculture. In May 2009, Hance became Secretary of Agriculture of Maryland. He held this post in the Cabinet of Governor Martin O'Malley until 2015.

In 2018, Hance was elected to a seat on the Calvert County Board of County Commissioners. On December 15, 2020, Hance became the President of the Calvert County Board of County Commissioners.

== Personal life ==
A fourth-generation family farmer, growing corn and soybean crops, and previously tobacco. He is married with three children.
