= Lake Wilson =

Lake Wilson may refer to one of these locations:

- Lake Wilson (Arkansas County, Arkansas), a lake in Arkansas County, Arkansas, USA
- Lake Wilson (Washington County, Arkansas), a lake in Washington County, Arkansas, USA
- Lake Wilson, Minnesota, a town in Leeds Township, Murray County, USA
- Lake Wilson (Murray County, Minnesota), USA
- Lake Wilson, a lake in Hawaii, USA
- Lake Wilson (New Zealand), a mountain tarn which is the source of the Routeburn River

== See also ==
- Wilson Lake (disambiguation)
