= Willson =

Willson may refer to:

- Willson (name)
- Willson River, a river on Kangaroo Island in South Australia
- Willson River, South Australia, a locality on Kangaroo Island
- Willson Tower, a building in Cleveland, Ohio, USA

== See also ==
- Wilson (disambiguation)
