= Justice Wilson =

Justice Wilson may refer to:

== United States Supreme Court ==
- James Wilson (Founding Father) (1742–1798), associate justice of the United States Supreme Court

== U.S. state supreme courts ==
- Alma Wilson (1917–1999), associate justice and chief justice of the Oklahoma Supreme Court
- Donald R. Wilson (1917–1983), associate justice of the Supreme Court of Appeals of West Virginia
- Edward H. C. Wilson (1820–1870), associate justice of the Michigan Supreme Court
- Francis S. Wilson (1872–1951), associate justice of the Supreme Court of Illinois
- Joseph G. Wilson (1826–1873), associate justice of the Oregon Supreme Court
- Kenneth B. Wilson (born 1938), associate justice of the New Mexico Supreme Court
- Michael D. Wilson (fl. 2010s–2020s), associate justice of the Supreme Court of Hawaii
- Paul C. Wilson (born 1961), judge of the Supreme Court of Missouri
- Samuel B. Wilson (1873–1954), chief justice of the Minnesota Supreme Court
- Scott Wilson (judge) (1870–1942), chief justice of the Maine Supreme Judicial Court
- Thomas Stokeley Wilson (1813–1894), judge of the Iowa Territorial Supreme Court
- Thomas Wilson (Minnesota politician) (1827–1910), associate justice of the Minnesota Supreme Court
- Will Wilson (Texas politician) (1912–2005), justice of the Texas Supreme Court
- William C. Wilson (judge) (1812–1882), associate justice of the Vermont Supreme Court
- William Roscoe Wilson Curl (died 1782), associate justice of the first Virginia Court of Appeals (now the Supreme Court of Virginia)
- William Wilson (Illinois judge) (1794–1857), associate justice of the Supreme Court of Illinois

== Courts of other countries ==
- Nicholas Wilson, Lord Wilson of Culworth (born 1945), justice of the Supreme Court of the United Kingdom
- Bertha Wilson (1923–2007), puisne justice of the Supreme Court of Canada
- Ronald Wilson (1922–2005), justice of the High Court of Australia

== See also ==
- Wilson (name)
- Judge Wilson (disambiguation)
