= Wilson Creek (Clinton County, Ohio) =

Stream in Clinton County, Ohio, U.S.

Wilson Creek is a stream in Clinton County, Ohio, in the United States.

Wilson Creek was named for Amos and Isaac Wilson, pioneer settlers.

== Location ==
- Mouth: Confluence with West Branch Rattlesnake Creek in Richland Township 39°31′06″N 83°36′11″W
- Origin: Wilson Township northwest of Sabina 39°32′39″N 83°41′39″W

== Other creeks ==
The U.S. Geographic Names Information System (GNIS) names another Wilson Creek in Clinton County. That creek feeds into Cowan Lake southwest of Wilmington.

== See also ==
- List of rivers of Ohio
