= Wilson Building =

Wilson Building or variants may refer to the following buildings in the United States:

- John A. Wilson Building, Washington, D.C.
- Wilson Building (Clinton, Iowa)
- Philip Wilson Building, Carmel-by-the-Sea, California
- Wilson Building (Fairfield, Iowa)
- Wilson Building (Camden, New Jersey)
- Wilson Building (Los Angeles), California
- J. L. Wilson Building, Durant, Oklahoma, listed on the National Register of Historic Places listings in Bryan County, Oklahoma
- A. K. Wilson Building, Dallas, Oregon, listed on the National Register of Historic Places listings in Polk County, Oregon
- Wilson Block (Dallas, Texas)
- Wilson Building (Dallas)
- Wilson Warehouse, Buchanan, Virginia
