= Wilson Creek (Ohio River tributary) =

Stream in Indiana, U.S.

Physical characteristics
- Mouth
  - coordinates: 39°04′07″N 84°53′09″W

Wilson Creek is a stream in the U.S. state of Indiana. It is a tributary to the Ohio River.

Wilson Creek was named after a pioneer settler who was killed by Indians.
