= Lake Wilson (Murray County, Minnesota) =

Lake in the state of Minnesota, United States

- Location within Minnesota
- Location: Murray County, Minnesota
- Coordinates: 43°59.5′N 95°56.5′W
- Type: lake

Lake Wilson is a lake in Murray County, in the U.S. state of Minnesota.

Lake Wilson was named for Jonathan E. Wilson, a local landowner.

== See also ==
- List of lakes in Minnesota
