= Wilson Reef =

Coordinates: 13°58′42″S 144°28′25″E

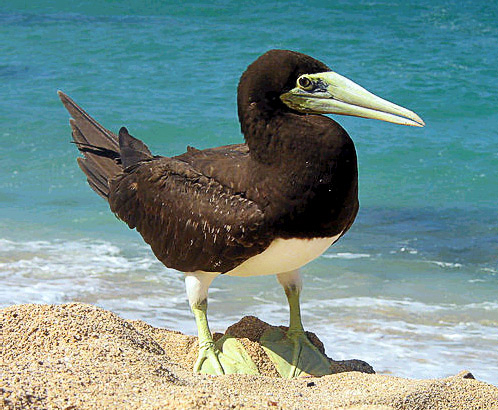
The reef is an important nesting site for brown boobies

Wilson Reef is a small (4.5 ha) coral reef within the Great Barrier Reef complex of Queensland, Australia. It lies about 30 km north of Cape Melville on the Cape York Peninsula in the habitat protection zone of the Great Barrier Reef Marine Park. It has some unnamed sand cays which are used by seabirds but no significant islands. It is named after Peter Wilson, a New Zealander whose ship crashed on the reef in 1927.

== Birds ==
The reef has been identified as an Important Bird Area (IBA) by BirdLife International because it has supported over 1% of the world population of brown boobies (with up to 1400 nests) and about 10,000 pairs of sooty terns. Up to 6000 pairs of common noddies have also been recorded nesting on the reef.
