= Wilson, Calvert County, Maryland =

Unincorporated community in Maryland, United States

Wilson, Maryland
- Unincorporated community
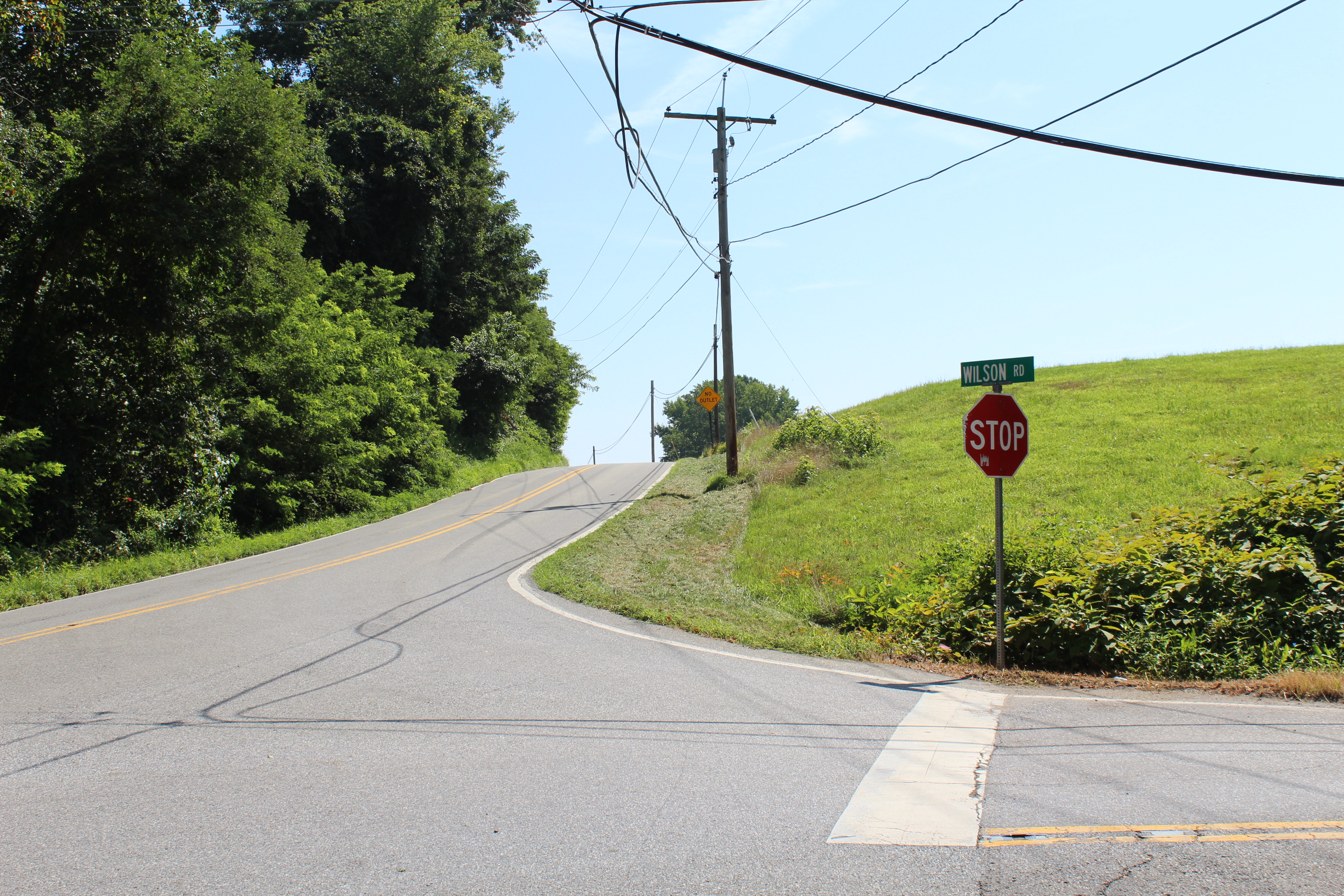
- Intersection of Wilson Road and Plum Point Road.

- Location within Maryland
- Coordinates: 38°36′11″N 76°31′19″W
- Country: United States
- State: Maryland
- County: Calvert
- Elevation: 72 ft (22 m)
- Time zone: UTC-5 (Eastern (EST))
  - Summer (DST): UTC-4 (EDT)
- Area codes: 410, 443, and 667
- GNIS feature ID: 591568

Wilson is an unincorporated community in Calvert County, Maryland, United States. Wilson is located along Wilson Road near the Chesapeake Bay, 5.5 miles (8.9 km) northeast of Prince Frederick.
