= Wilson, Okmulgee County, Oklahoma =

United States designated area

Coordinates: 35°30′27″N 96°02′05″W

Wilson, is an unincorporated community in Okmulgee County, Oklahoma, located about 7 miles northwest of the center of Henryetta, Oklahoma, located off Wilson Road. This is not to be confused with the Wilson in Carter County, Oklahoma southeast of Healdton nor the Wilson in Pushmataha County, Oklahoma.

The 1918 Wilson School was listed on the National Register of Historic Places listings in Okmulgee County, Oklahoma, but has been demolished. There remains a Wilson Public School District.
