= Wilson, Kaufman County, Texas =

Wilson, Texas
- Unincorporated community
- Location within Texas Location within the United States
- Coordinates: 32°40′57″N 96°17′31″W
- Country: United States
- State: Texas
- County: Kaufman
- Elevation: 453 ft (138 m)
- Time zone: UTC-6 (Central (CST))
  - Summer (DST): UTC-5 (CDT)
- GNIS feature ID: 1379283

Wilson is an unincorporated community in Kaufman County, located in the U.S. state of Texas.
