= Wilson Creek (Wisconsin) =

Stream in Sauk County, Wisconsin, U.S.

Coordinates: 43°11′33″N 90°00′44″W

Wilson Creek is a stream in Sauk County, Wisconsin, in the United States.

Wilson Creek was named for Thomas Wilson, a pioneer settler.

== See also ==
- List of rivers of Wisconsin
