= Wilson, Wisconsin =

Wilson is the name of some places in the U.S. state of Wisconsin:

- Wilson, Dunn County, Wisconsin, a town
- Wilson, Eau Claire County, Wisconsin, a town
  - Wilson (community), Wisconsin, an unincorporated community
- Wilson, Lincoln County, Wisconsin, a town
- Wilson, Rusk County, Wisconsin, a town
- Wilson, Sheboygan County, Wisconsin, a town
- Wilson, St. Croix County, Wisconsin, a village
