= Wilsonville =

Wilsonville is the name of several communities in North America:

== Canada ==
- Wilsonville, Norfolk County, Ontario

== United States ==
- Wilsonville, Alabama
- Wilsonville, Connecticut, a village within Thompson, Connecticut.
- Wilsonville, Illinois
- Wilsonville, Kentucky
- Wilsonville, Nebraska
- Wilsonville, North Carolina
- Wilsonville, Oregon
- Wilsonville, Pennsylvania
