= Wilson, Garrett County, Maryland =

Unincorporated community in Maryland, United States

Wilson, Maryland
- Unincorporated community
- Location within Maryland
- Coordinates: 39°25′56″N 79°16′13″W
- Country: United States
- State: Maryland
- County: Garrett
- Elevation: 2,579 ft (786 m)
- Time zone: UTC-5 (Eastern (EST))
  - Summer (DST): UTC-4 (EDT)
- Area codes: 301, 240
- GNIS feature ID: 591570

Wilson is an unincorporated community in Garrett County, Maryland, United States. Wilson is located on a CSX Transportation line 7.5 miles (12.1 km) east-northeast of Oakland.
