= New Hope =

New Hope may refer to:

== Places ==
=== United States ===
- New Hope, Alabama
- New Hope, Arkansas (disambiguation)
- New Hope, Florida
- New Hope, Early County, Georgia
- New Hope, Paulding County, Georgia
- New Hope, Illinois
- New Hope, Warrick County, Indiana
- New Hope, Kentucky, in Nelson County, Kentucky
- New Hope, Minnesota
- New Hope, Mississippi
- New Hope, Missouri
- New Hope, North Carolina (disambiguation), several places
- New Hope, Brown County, Ohio
- New Hope, Preble County, Ohio
- New Hope, Pennsylvania
- New Hope, Tennessee
- New Hope, Texas, in Collin County
- New Hope, Cherokee County, Texas
- New Hope, Henderson County, Texas
- New Hope, Smith County, Texas
- New Hope, Sunnyvale, Texas, in Dallas County
- New Hope, Virginia (disambiguation), several places
- New Hope, West Virginia (disambiguation), several places
- New Hope, Wisconsin, a town
  - New Hope (community), Wisconsin, an unincorporated community
- New Hope Creek, a waterway in central North Carolina
  - New Hope Valley
- New Hope Rosenwald School, listed on the National Register of Historic Places near Fredonia, Alabama

== Organisations ==
- New Hope Group, an Australian coal mining company
- New Hope (Macau), a political party in Macau
- New Hope (Israel), a political party in Israel
- New Hope (Poland), a political party in Poland formerly known as KORWiN

=== United States ===
- New Hope Academy, a private school in Landover Hills, Prince George's County, Maryland
- New Hope Christian Fellowship, Honolulu, Hawaii
- New Hope Christian Schools, Oregon
- New Hope Film Festival, New Hope, Pennsylvania

== Other uses ==
- New Hope, a 1998 collection of short stories written by Ernest Haycox, featuring "The Roaring Hour" (1932), "The Kid from River Red" (1932) and "The Hour of Fury" (1933)
- The New Hope, a 1941 novel by Joseph C. Lincoln and Freeman Lincoln
- Star Wars: Episode IV – A New Hope, the retroactive alternative title of the 1977 film Star Wars
- The New Hope, the subtitle of the 1981 radio adaptation of Star Wars
- NewHope, a post-quantum cryptography algorithm
- New Hope and Ivyland Railroad, a railroad tourist attraction in New Hope, Pennsylvania
- New Hope Valley Railway, a small train ride in North Carolina
- The New Hope, later name of The Kit Kats, an American rock band
- Operation New Hope, an education campaign in Ladakh, India to overhaul government primary schools

=== Television episodes ===
- "New Hope", DogTown season 3, episode 2 (2009)
- "New Hope", Garo: The Animation – The Carved Seal of Flames episode 9 (2019)
- "New Hope", Highway Thru Hell season 3, episode 2 (2014)
- "New Hope", Niña Niño episode 197 (2022)
- "New Hope", Thunderstone season 2, episode 9 (1999)
- "New Hope", When Hope Calls season 1, episode 1 (2019)

== See also ==
- New (disambiguation)
- Hope (disambiguation)
- A New Hope (disambiguation)
- New Hope High School (disambiguation)
- New Hope School (disambiguation)
