= Samuel L. Smith =

American architect (1875–1956)

Samuel Leonard Smith
- Born: October 10, 1875; Humphreys County, Tennessee, U.S.
- Died: September 9, 1956 (aged 80); Nashville, Tennessee, U.S.
- Other names: S. L. Smith, Samuel L. Smith, Samuel Smith
- Education: Southwestern Presbyterian University (BA), George Peabody College for Teachers (MA), University of Chicago, Harvard University
- Occupation(s): Educator, academic administrator, lawyer, author, architect

Samuel Leonard Smith (1875–1956) was an American educator, academic administrator, lawyer, author, and architect. He was involved in the supervision and school design for Rosenwald Schools, particularly in the rural Southern states. He was also a provost emeritus for George Peabody College for Teachers.

== Biography ==
Samuel Leonard Smith was born on October 10, 1875, in Humphreys County, Tennessee. He was educated in a one-room schoolhouse, and attended Pinewood Academy; the Waverly Training School; McEwen and Dickson Normal School.

He graduated from Southwestern Presbyterian University (now Rhodes College) in Clarksville, Tennessee, and earned a master's of art degree in rural school education from George Peabody College for Teachers (now Vanderbilt Peabody College of Education and Human Development). Smith also studied at the University of Chicago and at Harvard University.

Smith was a student of health education professor Fletcher B. Dresslar (1858–1930) who conducted an important initial survey for Rosenwald Schools. In 1902, Smith passed the Tennessee state bar examination.

Smith was a rural school agent in Tennessee of the Rosenwald School program, then General Field Agent. From 1920 until 1938, he served as the director of the Southern Offices for the Julius Rosenwald Fund. Smith created a series of school plans, for one-teacher, one-room, two-room, and six-room and other sized schools, in various orientations suited for the weather and light of rural schools in the U.S. south. These designs were issued in a booklet entitled Community School Plans (1924), which also included contractor specifications and other guidance.

In 1938, he worked as a director of public relations for the George Peabody College for Teachers (now Vanderbilt Peabody College of Education and Human Development) in Nashville, Tennessee, and in 1946 he was promoted to provost where he remained for one year.

Smith died of a heart attack on September 9, 1956, in Nashville.

== List of works ==
Numerous works associated with him survive and are listed on the U.S. National Register of Historic Places. Works credited to him include (with variants in attribution as indicated in National Register listing):

- Allen-White School, 100 Allen Extension St. Whiteville, TN (Smith, Samuel L.)
- Bigelow Rosenwald School, Jct. of AR 60 and Bethel AME Rd. Toad Suck, AR (Smith, Samuel L.)
- DeLeon Springs Colored School, 330 E. Retta St. DeLeon Springs, FL (Smith, Samuel L.)
- Dunbar Public School, 113 Steekee St. Loudon, TN (Smith, Samuel L.)
- Durham's Chapel School, 5055 Old TN 31E Bethpage, TN (Smith, Samuel L.)
- Eleanor Roosevelt School, Parham St. at Leverette Hill Rd. Warm Springs, GA (Smith, Samuel L.)
- Free Hills Rosenwald School, Free Hills Rd., E of TN 52 Free Hill, TN (Smith, Samuel L.)
- Hope Rosenwald School, 1971 Hope Station Rd. Pomaria, SC (Smith, Samuel L.)
- Hopewell Rosenwald School, adjacent to 253 Hopewell Church Road (SC Sec RD 33–12) Clarks Hill, SC (Smith, Samuel L.)
- Lafayette County Training School, 1046 Berry St. Stamps, AR (Smith, Samuel L.)
- Lincoln School, Old TN 28 near Rockford Rd. Pikeville, TN (Smith, Samuel)
- Merritt School, Old Troy Rd., 0.5 mi. S of US 82 Midway, AL (Smith, Samuel)
- Oak Grove School, 0.25 mi. W of AL 69, 1 mi. N of jct. of AL 69 and US-80 Prairieville, AL (Smith, Samuel)
- Orange City Colored School, 200 E. Blue Springs Ave. Orange City, FL (Smith, Samuel L.)
- Ridge Hill High School, 206 Ridge Hill Dr Ridge Spring, SC (Smith, Samuel L.)
- Selma Rosenwald School, Selma—Collins Rd., approx. 0.25 mi. S of US 278 Selma, AR (Smith, Samuel)
- Shiloh Missionary Baptist Church and Rosenwald School (only the school portion) in Notasulga, Alabama (Smith, Samuel L.)
- Tankersley Rosenwald School, 10 mi. S. on Montgomery on US 31 to Pettus Rd. to School Spur on W. side Hope Hull, AL (Smith, Samuel L.)
- Wells School, 4140 Collierville—Arlington Rd. Eads, TN (Smith, Samuel)

== Publications ==
- Smith, Samuel (1924). Community School Plans (pamphlet with schematic). Julius Rosenwald Fund.
- Smith, Samuel Leonard (1940). The Passing of the Hampton Library School. Columbia University.
- Smith, Samuel Leonard (1950). Builders of Goodwill: The Story of the State Agents of Negro Education in the South, 1910 to 1950. Tennessee Book Company.
- Smith, Samuel Leonard (1952). Builders of Health and Happiness: The Story of the Tennessee Tuberculosis Association. Tennessee Tuberculosis Association.

== See also ==
- William Augustus Hazel (1854–1929) African American architect that also worked on designing for the Rosenwald schools
