= A New Hope (disambiguation) =

Star Wars: Episode IV – A New Hope is a 1977 science fiction film by George Lucas and the first film in the Star Wars franchise to be released and the fourth chapter chronologically in the nine-part Skywalker Saga. The film was originally titled just Star Wars.

A New Hope may also refer to:

== Star Wars ==
- Star Wars: From the Adventures of Luke Skywalker, a 1976 novelization of the film, republished as Star Wars: A New Hope
- Star Wars Episode IV: A New Hope (soundtrack)
- The Art of Star Wars, a 1979 book edited by Carol Titelman, later republished as The Art of Star Wars: Episode IV – A New Hope
- Star Wars, a 1981 radio adaptation of the film, later retitled The New Hope on rebroadcasts
- Star Wars: A New Hope, a 1997 picture book adaptation of the film, written and illustrated by Ken Steacy
- Star Wars: A New Hope — The Special Edition, a 1997 comic adaptation of the "Special Edition" of the film, published as a four-issue limited series by Dark Horse Comics
- Star Wars Manga: A New Hope, a 1997 manga adaptation of the film, illustrated by Hisao Tamaki and published by MediaWorks
- Choose Your Own Star Wars Adventure: A New Hope, a 1998 gamebook in the Choose Your Own Adventure series by Christopher Golden
- Star Wars Infinities: A New Hope, a 2002 four-part story arc in the Star Wars Infinities comic book series
- Star Wars: Episode IV – A New Hope, a 2004 junior novelization of the film by Ryder Windham
- William Shakespeare's Star Wars: Verily, a New Hope, a 2013 non-canon book by Ian Doescher

== Music ==
- A New Hope (Amboog-a-Lard album) (1993)
- A New Hope (Minipop album) and title track (2007)
- A New Hope (Vanna album) (2009)
- "A New Hope", a 1997 song by Blink-182 from Dude Ranch
- "A New Hope", a 2000 song by Five Iron Frenzy from All the Hype That Money Can Buy

== Television ==
- "Episode IV: A New Hope", Reaper season 2, episode 1 (2009)
- "A New Hope", Childrens Hospital season 5, episode 1 (2013)
- "A New Hope", Galactik Football season 1, episode 2 (2006)
- "A New Hope", God Friended Me season 2, episode 11 (2020)
- "A New Hope", Japan Sinks: 2020 episode 3 (2020)
- "A New Hope", Legacies season 3, episode 15 (2021)
- "A New Hope", Roman Empire season 3, episode 2 (2019)
- "A New Hope", Run the World season 2, episode 6 (2023)
- "A New Hope", That '70s Show season 1, episode 20 (1999)
- "A New Hope", Two Guys and a Girl season 3, episode 1 (1999)
- "A New Hope", Warehouse 13 season 4, episode 1 (2012)
- Punar Vivah – Ek Nayi Umeed (lit. 'Remarriage – A New Hope'), a 2013 Indian TV series

== See also ==
- New Hope (disambiguation)
- New Hope High School (disambiguation)
- New Hope School (disambiguation)
