= The Rosenwald School Building Fund and Associated Buildings Multiple Property Submission =

- U.S. National Register of Historic Places
- NRHP reference No.: 64500011

The Rosenwald School Building Fund and Associated Buildings Multiple Property Submission is a multiple property submission of historic Rosenwald Schools in Alabama that were listed together on the National Register of Historic Places. The schools are historically significant for their contribution to African American education in the state. They were designed and partially built with funds from the Rosenwald Fund during the period spanning from 1913 to 1937. The fund provided one-third of the construction money, with the community and state splitting the remainder.

The first 80 Rosenwald Schools were built in Alabama, with the first to be completed in Loachapoka in 1913. The Rosenwald Program was then expanded to 14 other southeastern states after the first 80 in Alabama. By the end of the program, a total of 387 schools, 7 teacher's houses, and several vocational buildings had been completed within the state. Following desegregation many of the former schools were scavenged for building materials, converted to other uses, or demolished by neglect. At the time of the multiple property listing, the commission charged with documenting and nominating the schools had only located seven surviving Rosenwald-funded structures, with six eligible to be listed under the National Register of Historic Places criteria.

Resource Name	Also known as	Coordinates	City	County	Added	Notes
Emory School	Tunstall School	32°36′46″N 87°41′48″W	Greensboro vicinity	Hale County	February 20, 1998	
Merritt School		32°4′29″N 85°32′3″W	Midway	Bullock County	February 20, 1998	
Mount Sinai School		32°33′1″N 86°32′43″W	Prattville vicinity	Autauga County	November 29, 2001	
New Hope Rosenwald School		32°56′36″N 85°17′8″W	Fredonia	Chambers County	November 29, 2001	
Oak Grove School		32°32′48″N 87°40′48″W	Prairieville vicinity	Hale County	March 3, 1998	
Tankersley Rosenwald School	Tankersley Elementary School	32°7′49″N 86°21′8″W	Hope Hull	Montgomery County	January 22, 2009	

== See also ==
- National Register of Historic Places Multiple Property Submissions in Alabama
