= New Hope School =

New Hope School(s) may refer to:

- New Hope Rosenwald School, in Fredonia, Alabama, listed on the U.S. National Register of Historic Places (NRHP)
- New Hope School (Wynne, Arkansas), NRHP-listed
- New Hope Schools, in the Lowndes County (Mississippi) School District
- New Hope Christian Schools, in Grants Pass, Oregon
- New Hope School (art movement), or Pennsylvania Impressionism, an early-20th century American art movement

== See also ==
- New Hope High School (disambiguation)
- New Hope (disambiguation)
- Hope School (disambiguation)
- Hopewell School (disambiguation)
