= Hope Hull =

Hope Hull may refer to:

- Hope Hull (minister) (1763–1818), a Methodist of Georgia (U.S. state)
- Hope Hull, Alabama
