= Kit Kat (disambiguation) =

KitKat is a chocolate-coated wafer confection.

Kit Kat, Kit Cat or Kitkat may also refer to:

== Arts and entertainment ==
- Kit Kat Klub, a fictional place in the 1966 show Cabaret and 1972 film
- Kit Kat, a fictional character in the 1991 film Hudson Hawk
- The Kit Kat, a 1991 Egyptian film
- Kit Kat band, the orchestra of Arthur Rosebery
- The Kit Kats, an American rock band

== Businesses and organisations ==
- Kit-Cat Club, an early 18th-century English club in London with strong political and literary associations, whose name derives from "Kit Kats" mutton pies
- Kit Kat Club, a New York City cabaret venue, now Stephen Sondheim Theatre
- Kit Kat Club, a 1920s London nightclub, in the later Odeon Haymarket
- KitKatClub, a Berlin night club opened in 1994
- Kit Kat Guest Ranch, a brothel in Nevada, US
- Kit-Kat Press, a printing press associated with the Oxford University Society of Bibliophiles
- Kit Kat Club, a New York City artists' club that inspired the Kokoon Arts Club
- Playhouse Theatre, a West End theatre renamed to the Kit Kat Club for the 2021 revival of the musical Cabaret

== People ==
- Kitkat (comedian) (Soraya Ray L. Bañas, born 1987)
- Sidney Kitcat (1868–1942), English cricketer

== Other uses ==
- Kit-cat portrait, a particular size of portrait
- Android KitKat, version 4.4 of the Google mobile operating system
- Kit-Cat Klock, an art deco novelty-style clock
- KitKat (cat), a San Francisco bodega cat killed by a Waymo car in 2025
- Kit Kat, a station under Kit Kat Square on the Cairo Metro Line 3, Egypt
- Kit Kat Café, a famous café located in Baghdad, Iraq

== See also ==
- Kat (disambiguation)
- Kit (disambiguation)
