= William Augustus Hazel =

American architect (1854–1929)

- Born: September 12, 1854; Wilmington, North Carolina, U.S.
- Died: February 13, 1929 (aged 74); Massachusetts, U.S.
- Other name: W.A. Hazel
- Occupations: Architect, stained glass artist, educator, academic administrator, civil rights activist
- Spouse: Rosa Elizabeth Grosvenor Hazard (m. 1882–)
- Children: 5

William Augustus Hazel (1854–1929) was an American architect, stained glass artist, educator, academic administrator, and civil rights activist. He was the first dean of the Howard University School of Architecture in 1919. He is considered an important figure in the architectural history of the Twin Cities in Minnesota; and was one of the first Black stained glass artists in the United States.

== Early life and education ==
William Augustus Hazel was born on September 12, 1854, in Wilmington, North Carolina, to free Black parents Margaret Ann Kellogg and Benjamin Gilette Hazel. His father had apprenticed with carpenter William Kellogg, another free Black person who later became his father-in law. After the marriage, the Hazel family moved to Ohio; and after the American Civil War they moved to Cambridge, Massachusetts. His father Benjamin Gilette Hazel worked as a carpenter and wheelright, and his mother Margaret Ann Kellogg took care of their home and children. Hazel attended public schools in Cambridge, Massachusetts, where he excelled at fine art.

In 1872, Hazel apprenticed under John La Farge, a French-born stained glass craftsman. While appreciating, they worked on the stained glass at the Trinity Church (1873) in Boston. Starting in 1875, Hazel worked as a draftsman under architect Samuel J. F. Thayer, while living at 67 Cushing Street (later 125 Cushing Street, no longer extant) in the College Hill neighborhood of Providence, Rhode Island. He was married in 1882 to Rosa Elizabeth Grosvenor Hazard at the Mathewson Street Methodist Church in Providence, Rhode Island. Hazel continued apprenticeship under architect Charles Dexter Gambrill, formerly of the firm of Henry Hobson Richardson. During this time his wife Rosa was working as a teacher in the "Butler Demonstration School" at the Hampton Institute (now Hampton University) in Hampton, Virginia.

== Career ==
=== Minnesota ===
In January 1887, Hazel arrived in Saint Paul, Minnesota as a salesman for Tiffany and Company of New York, which caused a local stir because was uncommon to see Black artists and designers in that city during that time period. He was invited to speak at local stained glass events in Minnesota. The family moved to 1122 Raymond Avenue in the Saint Anthony Park neighborhood of Saint Paul.

In the spring of 1887, he was denied accommodation at two hotels (the Clarendon Hotel and Astoria Hotel) in Saint Paul based on his race; so he sued them based on the Minnesota Civil Rights Act of 1885. He won the high profiled lawsuit, which brought him more attention from the Black community. In 1881, Hazel was elected as the secretary for the Civil Rights Committee in Minnesota.

In 1888, Hazel worked under architect Francis Jefferson Roberson on Saint Peter's African Methodist Episcopal Church in Saint Paul, Minnesota; the records were not kept but it is known he worked specifically on the architectural design.

=== Stained glass work ===
In 1895, he had his first stained glass commission for a Catholic church newly built in Austin, Minnesota, the church has since been demolished. Saint Peter's African Methodist Episcopal Church in Springfield, Illinois hired Hazel to design 34 stained glass windows and contained images of Abraham Lincoln, John Brown, Elijah P. Lovejoy, and the "Grand Army" featuring a bust of General Ulysses S. Grant; unfortunately this church experienced a fire in 1903 and none of the windows survived. In 1897, he won a silver medal in decorative arts at the Tennessee Centennial and International Exposition in Nashville, for his drawings and stained glass window depicting Jesus Christ.

=== Tuskegee Institute, Howard University, and Frederick Douglass National Historic Site ===
In 1909, he joined the faculty in the mechanical industries department at Tuskegee Institute (now Tuskegee University) in Tuskegee, Alabama. While teaching he supervised the design and build of five buildings on campus (boys trade buildings), working alongside architect Albert Cassell. He remained at the school for a decade.

In the summer of 1919, following the departure of the Howard University's School of Applied Arts and Mechanics department dean William Jefferson Decatur, Hazel was hired as his replacement and charged with the establishment of creating the School of Architecture. He designed the department library, dining hall, and home economics building (now demolished).

The Frederick Douglass Memorial and Historical Association and Rev. Francis Grimke commissioned Hazel to restore the Frederick Douglass National Historic Site (or "Cedar Hill"), Washington, D.C. The restoration was completed in 1922, and is believed to have been the first historic architectural preservation project by a Black architect in the United States.

=== Later life ===
In 1924, Hazel moved to 1724 Christian Street in south Philadelphia, living only two blocks from Black architect Julian Francis Abele. He remained there until 1927, when his health started failing and he moved to the Cardinal Gibbons Institute in Ridge, Maryland to join his family. Hazel died of a heart attack on February 13, 1929, and was buried in Cambridge Family Cemetery in Cambridge, Massachusetts.

Hazel's profile was included in the biographical dictionary African American Architects: A Biographical Dictionary, 1865–1945 (2004).

== Works ==
- 1888, St. Peter's AME Church, 22nd Street between 9th and 10th Avenues South, St. Paul, Minnesota (demolished)
- 1895, Austin Catholic Church, Austin, Minnesota; stained glass windows only (demolished)
- 1899, St. Paul's AME Church, 6th and Mason Streets, Springfield, Illinois; stained glass windows only (destroyed in a fire)
- 1914, New Hope Rosenwald School, near Fredonia, Alabama; NRHP-listed
- 1915, Emory School, near Greensboro, Alabama; NRHP-listed
- 1919, Mount Sinai School, Prattville, Alabama; NRHP-listed
- 1921, Home Economics Building, Howard University campus, Washington, D.C. (demolished)
- 1921, Dining Hall, Howard University campus, Washington, D.C. (demolished)
- 1922, Frederick Douglass National Historic Site ("Cedar Hill") restoration, 1411 W Street SE, Washington, D.C.

== See also ==
- African-American architects
- Samuel L. Smith (1875–1956) American architect that also worked on the design of Rosenwald schools
