= Hope School =

Hope School may refer to:

in New Zealand

- Hope School (Tasman), Tasman, New Zealand

in the United States

(by state)

- Hope Street School, Woonsocket, Rhode Island, listed on the NRHP in Rhode Island
- Hope Rosenwald School, also known as Hope School, near Pomaria, South Carolina, listed on the National Register of Historic Places

== See also ==
- New Hope School (disambiguation)
