= New Hope, West Virginia =

New Hope is the name of several communities in the U.S. state of West Virginia.

- New Hope, Mercer County, West Virginia
- New Hope, Morgan County, West Virginia
- New Hope, Nicholas County, West Virginia
