= Tankersley Rosenwald School =

School in Hope Hull, Alabama, US (1922–1967)

- U.S. National Register of Historic Places
- Alabama Register of Landmarks and Heritage
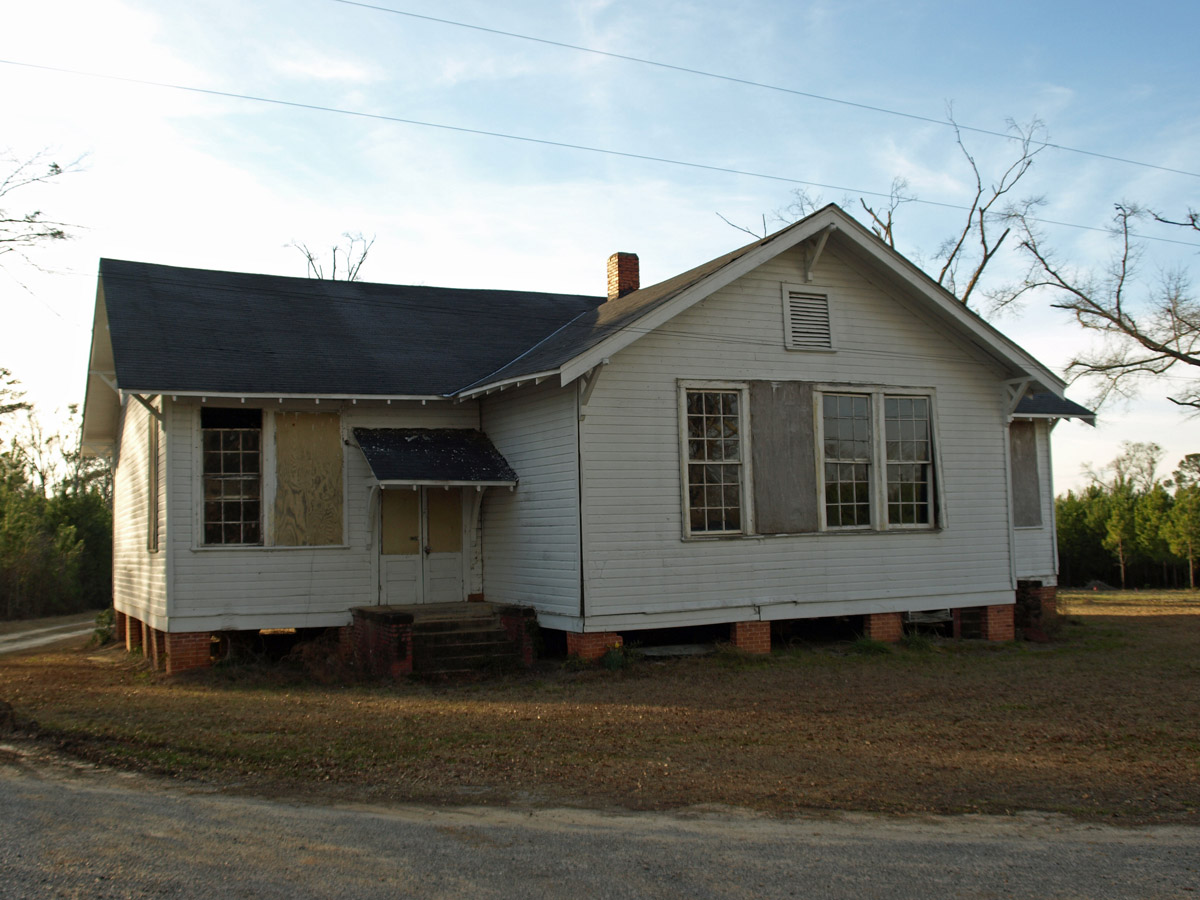
- The Tankersley Rosenwald School in 2009

- Location within Alabama Location within the United States
- Nearest city: Hope Hull, Alabama
- Coordinates: 32°8′32″N 86°21′25″W
- Area: 3.2 acres (1.3 ha)
- Architect: Smith, Samuel L.
- Architectural style: Bungalow/Craftsman
- MPS: The Rosenwald School Building Fund and Associated Buildings Multiple Property Submission
- NRHP reference No.: 08001332

Significant dates
- Added to NRHP: January 22, 2009
- Designated ARLH: June 26, 2003

The Tankersley Rosenwald School (1922–1967), also known as the Tankersley Elementary School, is a historic building and a former Rosenwald School for African American students in Hope Hull, Alabama, a suburb of Montgomery.

It was added to the Alabama Register of Landmarks and Heritage on June 26, 2003, and to the National Register of Historic Places as a part of The Rosenwald School Building Fund and Associated Buildings Multiple Property Submission on January 22, 2009. It also has a historical marker erected the Alabama Historical Commission.

== History ==
The first 5 acres (2.0 ha) land for the school was purchased from Dr. William Tankersley by the Montgomery County Board of Education. After World War I ended, local citizens purchased another 10 acres (4.0 ha) of adjacent land in order to build the new school.

The Tankersley Rosenwald School two-room school building was built in 1922, and designed by architect Samuel L. Smith following his own book Community School Plans (1924). It was constructed with Bungalow/Craftsman stylistic elements. The local African American community raised $1,500; the general "public" contributed $2,800; and the Julius Rosenwald Fund contributed $1,000 towards the new school building.

The founding principal was Jacob W. Williams, who had been teaching local children since 1917 at the old Pythian Temple Building, which became too crowded. It served as an elementary school for both boys and girls grade 1 through grade 6. It also offered a community library. It was used as a segregated elementary school for black children until 1967, when it closed due to desegregation.

== See also ==
- National Register of Historic Places listings in Montgomery County, Alabama
- Properties on the Alabama Register of Landmarks and Heritage in Montgomery County, Alabama
