= New Hope, Arkansas =

New Hope, Arkansas may refer to several places:

- New Hope, Pope County, Arkansas, an unincorporated community in Pope County
- Newhope, Arkansas, an unincorporated community in Pike County

== See also ==
- New Hope (disambiguation)
