= Mount Sinai School =

- U.S. National Register of Historic Places
- Alabama Register of Landmarks and Heritage
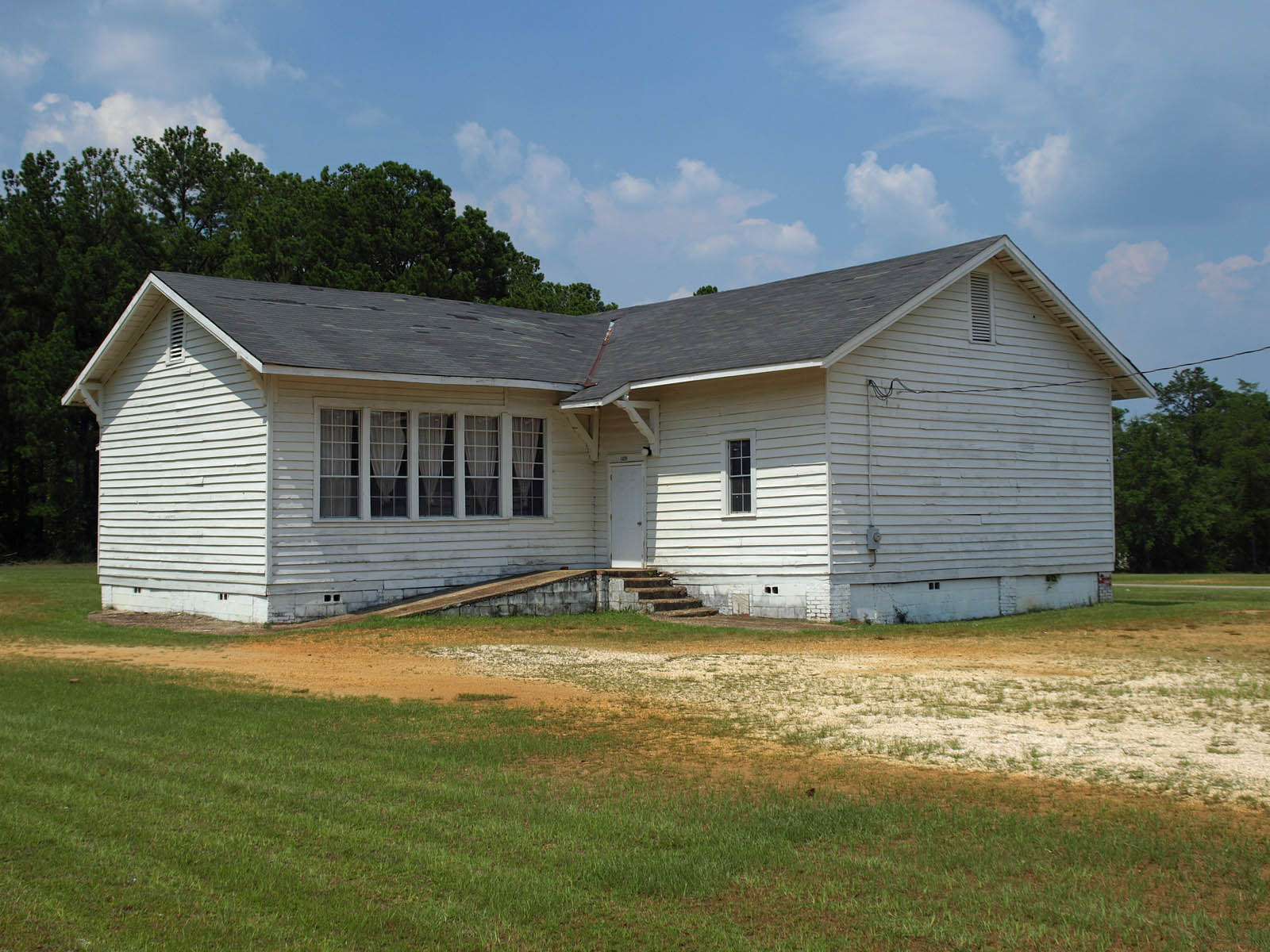
- Mount Sinai School in July 2011
- Location: 1820 County Road 57, Prattville, Alabama, U.S.
- Coordinates: 32°33′01″N 86°32′43″W
- Area: 5 acres (2.0 ha)
- Built: 1919
- Architect: William Augustus Hazel
- MPS: The Rosenwald School Building Fund and Associated Buildings Multiple Property Submission
- NRHP reference No.: 01001296

Significant dates
- Added to NRHP: November 29, 2001
- Designated ARLH: February 2, 2001

The Mount Sinai School (c. 1891–1967), or Mt. Sinai School, is a historic two-room Rosenwald School building and former black school located in rural Autauga County, Alabama, US, northwest in the city of Prattville. The school was added to the Alabama Register of Landmarks and Heritage on February 2, 2001; and was subsequently listed on the National Register of Historic Places on November 29, 2001, as a part of The Rosenwald School Building Fund and Associated Buildings Multiple Property Submission. The site has a historical marker erected 2019 by the Mount Sinai Community Center.

== History ==
=== First building ===
The school was founded in c. 1891 for African American students, holding classes in the Mount Sinai Baptist Church in Prattville, Alabama, and had its first one room building financed by the students’ parents. The original building was located between the church and the train station in Booth, Alabama. The original building was blown down in a storm, and the school relocated back to the church, before the building was rebuilt at its current site.

=== Current building ===
The land for the school was donated by Anthony Townsend. The one-story frame building was built in 1919, to the designs of architect William Augustus Hazel, and according to the plans found in The Rural Negro School Building and Its Relation to the Community (1913), published by the Tuskegee Institute. The Julius Rosenwald Fund provided US $500, the state of Alabama contributed $300; and the local African American community raised the remaining $525 to finance the school building.

When the new Mount Sinai building opened in 1919, they increased the school size and added a third teacher, through fund provided by the parent–teacher association.

== Closure and modern usage ==
Mount Sinai School closed in 1967, when the students were transferred to the Autauga County Training School at Autaugaville, Alabama.

The building was purchased in 1967 by the Mount Sinai Community Center, which has since incorporated. In 2024, the building was renovated; and is the only remaining Rosenwald building in Autauga County.

== See also ==
- National Register of Historic Places listings in Autauga County, Alabama
- Properties on the Alabama Register of Landmarks and Heritage in Autauga County, Alabama
