= Toad Suck Daze =

Annual community music, arts and food festival in Conway, Arkansas

Coordinates: 35.0898°N 92.4411°W

Toad Suck Daze is an annual community music, arts, and food festival in downtown Conway, Arkansas. It takes place every year and has been celebrated since 1982.

== Overview ==
The Toad Suck Daze festival draws an estimated 160,000 visitors each year. Key attractions include music, arts and crafts, a variety of food, carnival rides, and toad races. For the races, visitors enter toads that they have either brought from home or were bred in the community specifically for this event. The festival raises funds to provide educational scholarships to Faulkner County citizens. Over the past 28 years, the Toad Suck Daze committee has awarded over US$1 million in scholarships and contributed to scholarship endowments.

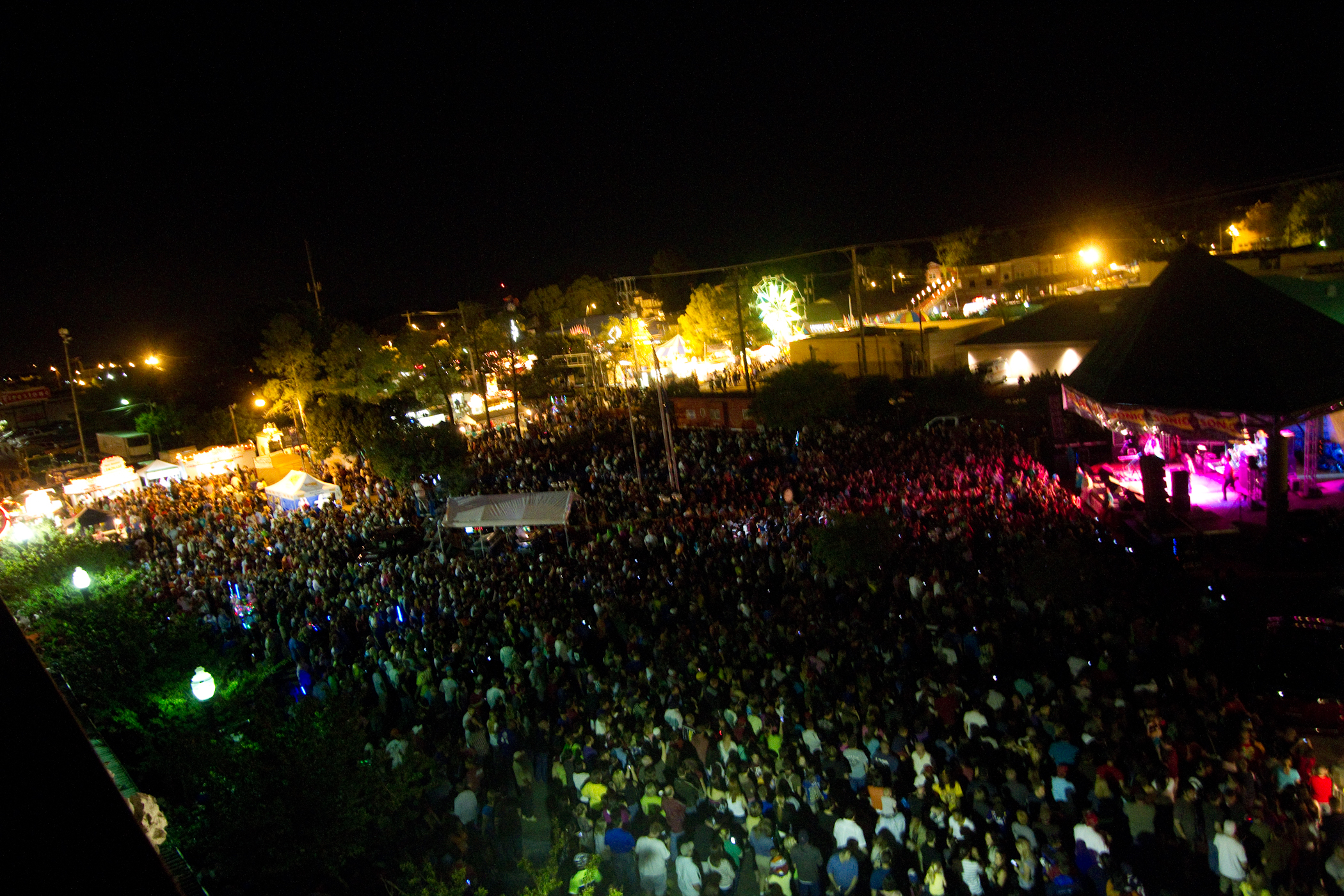
Toad Suck Daze attracts more than 150k visitors annually and has raised almost $2m for education

== History ==
First organized in 1982 in Perry County (Toad Suck Park), the festival is held annually in downtown Conway, Arkansas (Faulkner County), during the first weekend in May. Originally held in Toad Suck at Toad Suck Park on the Perry County side near the Toad Suck Ferry Lock and Dam, the festival was moved to the downtown location in 1990 due to flooding at the river, and it has remained in the downtown area ever since. The festival is run by volunteers from Conway and Faulkner County, including the local police and fire departments.

== Name origin ==
The legend behind Toad Suck refers to the time when steamboats traveled the Arkansas River. When the water was not deep enough, the steamboats tied up where the Toad Suck Ferry Lock and Dam now spans the river near Conway. While the captain and crew waited, they loitered over refreshments at the local tavern. People living nearby commented, "They suck on the bottle 'til they swell up like toads."

== References to Toad Suck Daze in popular culture ==
- The Colbert Report
- The Tonight Show
