= Abner W. McGehee =

- Born: Abner William McGehee; February 17, 1779; Prince Edward County, Virginia, U.S.
- Died: 1855 (aged 75–76)
- Occupations: Planter, businessman, investor
- Parent(s): Micajah McGehee; Nancy Scott
- Relatives: John Scott (maternal uncle)

Abner W. McGehee (1779–1855) was an American planter, businessman and investor. A plantation owner in Georgia, he moved to Alabama to invest in iron mines and railroads.

== Early life ==
Abner William McGehee was born on February 17, 1779, in Prince Edward County, Virginia. He grew up near the Broad River in the state of Georgia. His maternal uncle, John Scott, was the founder of Alabama Town, which merged with New Philadelphia to become Montgomery, Alabama, in 1819.

== Career and namesakes ==
McGehee was a planter, tanner and trader in Georgia. In the wake of the Treaty of Fort Jackson of 1814, he moved to Alabama. He established a plantation there. A community in Alabama was originally known as McGehee's Switch in honor of him, but he changed the name to Hope Hull in honor of the minister Hope Hull; the two had met while McGehee was living in Georgia. The U.S. post office in Hope Hull operated under the name McGehee's from 1875 until it was renamed Hope Hull in 1877.

== Personal life ==
McGehee converted to the Methodist Church in 1809.

== Death ==
McGehee died in 1855.
