= Bigelow Rosenwald School =

- U.S. National Register of Historic Places
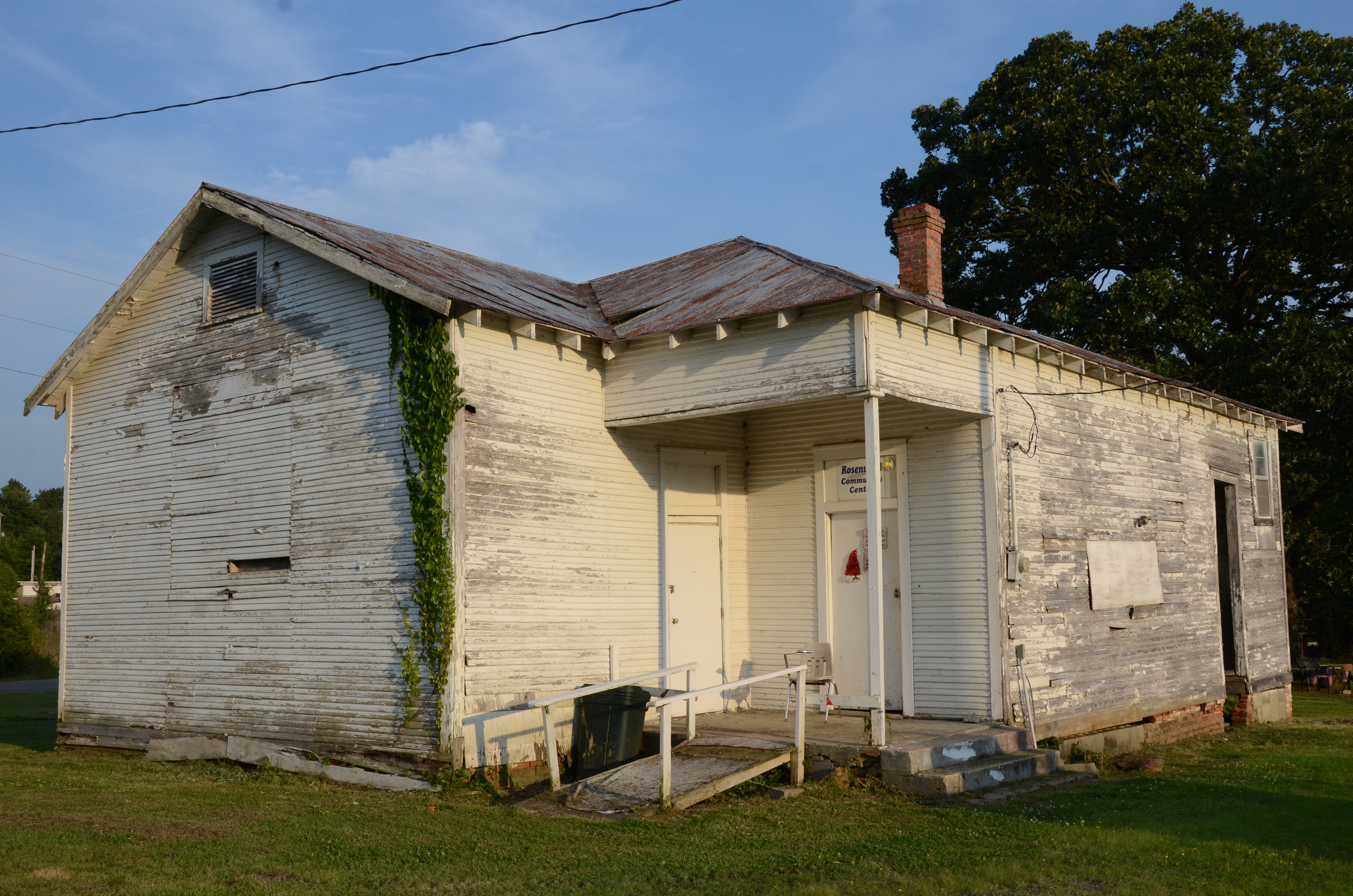

- Location within Arkansas Location within the United States
- Location: Jct. of AR 60 and Bethel AME Rd., Toad Suck, Arkansas
- Coordinates: 35°4′30″N 92°33′55″W
- Built: 1926
- Architect: Samuel L. Smith
- Architectural style: Rosenwald school
- NRHP reference No.: 04000491
- Added to NRHP: May 26, 2004

The Bigelow Rosenwald School, also known as Rosenwald Community Center, is a former Rosenwald School located in Toad Suck, about 10 miles (16 km) northeast of Bigelow, Perry County, Arkansas. Built in 1926, it is a single-story wood-frame building with vernacular Craftsman elements. It served as a school until 1964, when it became a community center. It is the only Rosenwald School building that still stands in Perry County.

The building was listed on the National Register of Historic Places in 2004.

== See also ==
- National Register of Historic Places listings in Perry County, Arkansas
