= New Hope, Virginia =

New Hope, Virginia may refer to:

- New Hope, Augusta County, Virginia
- New Hope, Charles City County, Virginia

== See also ==
- New Hope (disambiguation)
