= Emory School =

School near Greensboro, Alabama (1915–1960)

- U.S. National Register of Historic Places
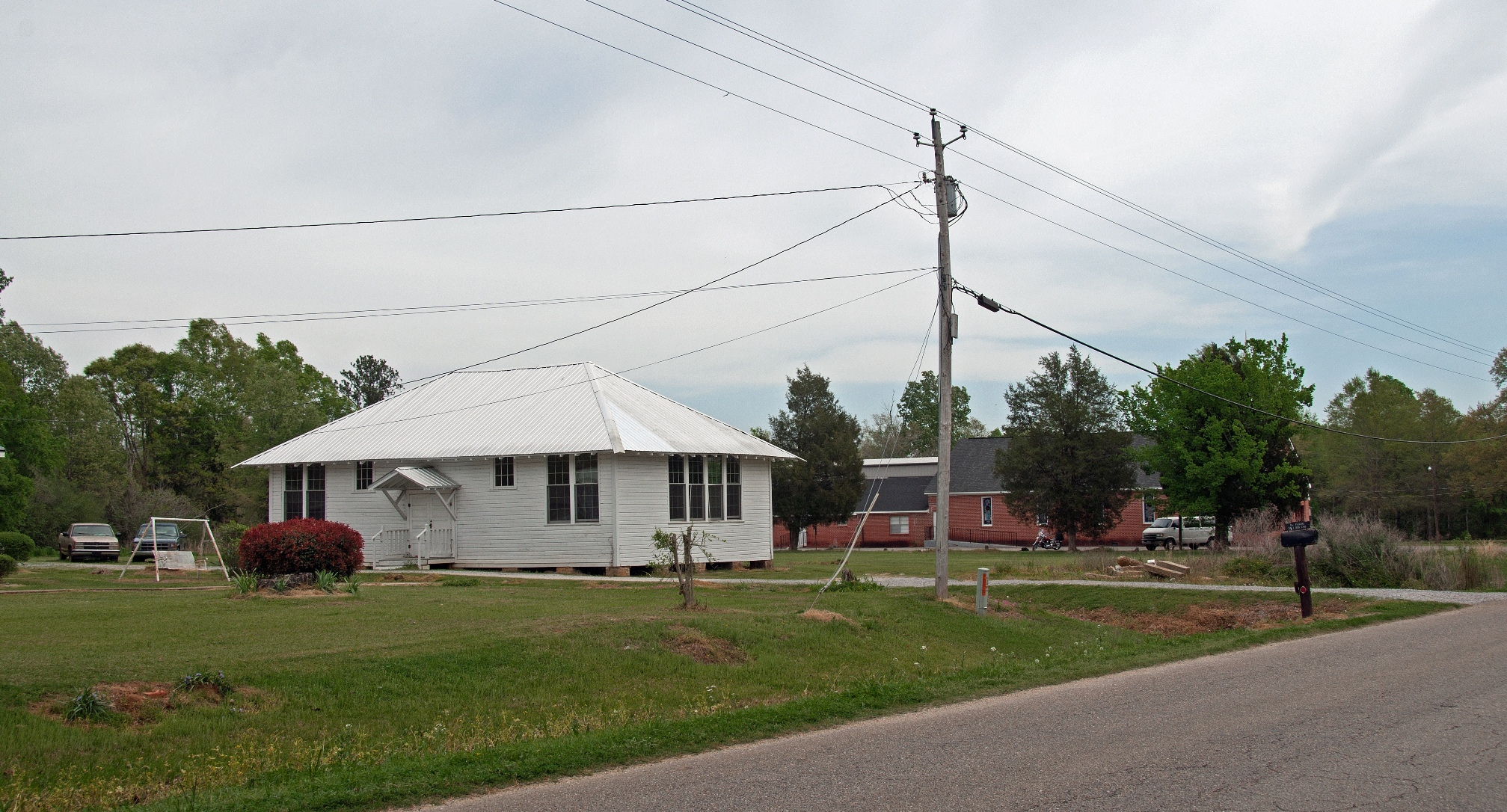

- Location within Alabama
- Nearest city: Greensboro, Alabama, US
- Coordinates: 32°36′46″N 87°41′48″W
- Built: 1915
- Architect: William Augustus Hazel
- MPS: The Rosenwald School Building Fund and Associated Buildings MPS
- NRHP reference No.: 98000109
- Added to NRHP: February 20, 1998

The Emory School (1915–1960), also known as the Tunstall School, is a historic one teacher Rosenwald School building, and former Black school, located near Greensboro, Alabama in rural Hale County, Alabama, US. The school was listed on the National Register of Historic Places on February 20, 1998, as a part of The Rosenwald School Building Fund and Associated Buildings Multiple Property Submission.

== History ==
It was built in 1915 to the designs of architect William Augustus Hazel. The land for the school was donated by the Tunstall family, a wealthy white family in Hale County. The Julius Rosenwald Fund provided $300; the local African-American community raised $550; the State of Alabama contributed $200; and the local white community contributed $10 to build the school.

The Emory School continued in use until 1960 when the students were consolidated with the Sawyerville School in Sawyerville, Alabama. After the closure the building was abandoned and used for agricultural storage.
