= Oak Grove School (Prairieville, Alabama) =

School in Hale County, Alabama, US (1925–1960s)

- U.S. National Register of Historic Places
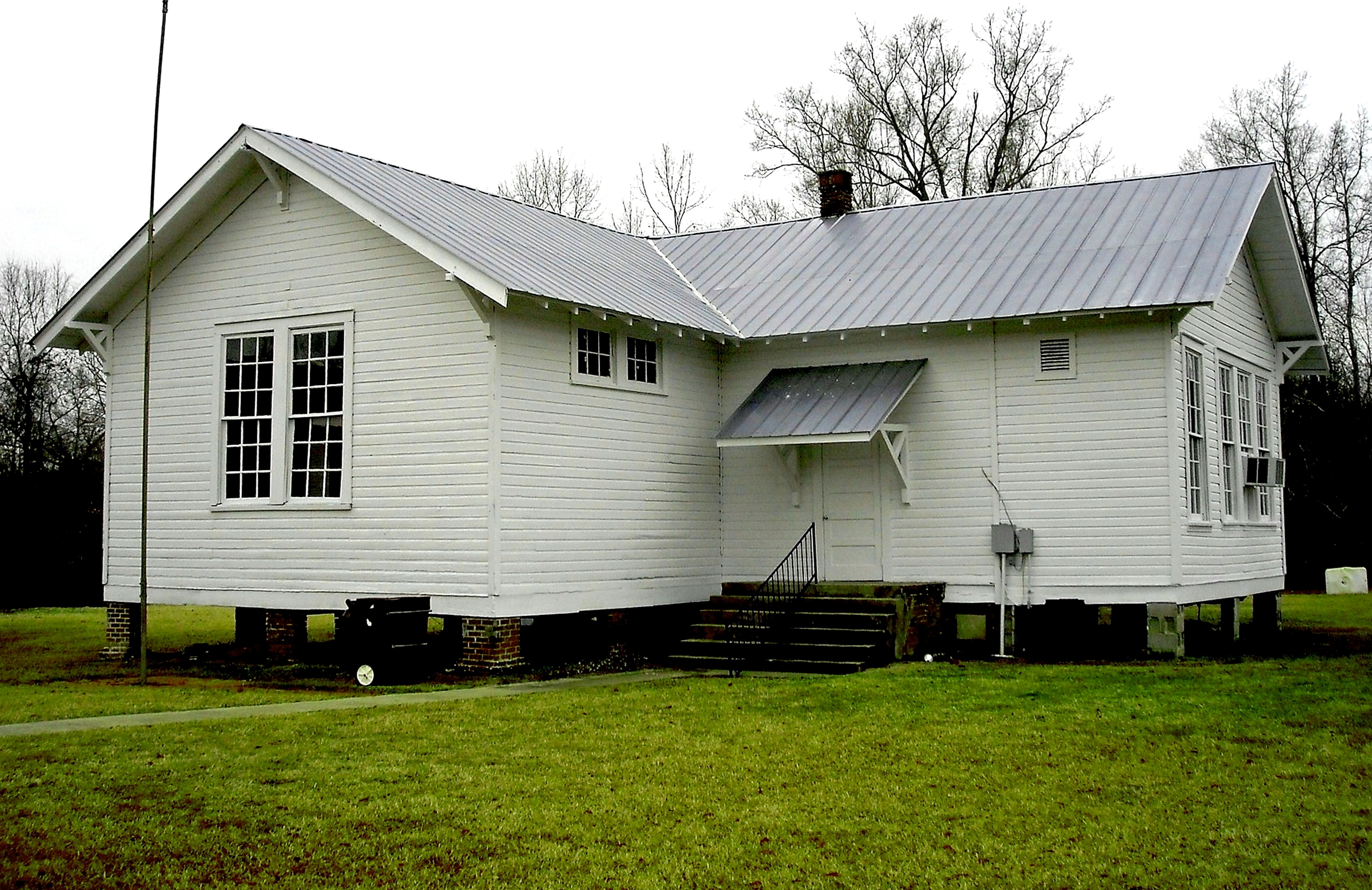

- Location within Alabama
- Nearest city: Prairieville, Alabama, U.S.
- Coordinates: 32°32′48″N 87°40′48″W
- Built: 1925
- Architect: Samuel L. Smith
- MPS: The Rosenwald School Building Fund and Associated Buildings Multiple Property Submission
- NRHP reference No.: 98000108
- Added to NRHP: March 3, 1998

The Oak Grove School (1925–1960s) is a historic two-room Rosenwald School building, and former black school in rural Hale County, Alabama, United States.

The school was listed on the National Register of Historic Places on March 3, 1998, as a part of The Rosenwald School Building Fund and Associated Buildings Multiple Property Submission. It also has a historical marker erected in 2001 by the Oak Grove School Heritage Committee, and the Cahaba Trace Commission.

== History ==
The Oak Grove School was designed by architect Samuel L. Smith in 1925, based on his guidelines published in Community School Plans (1924). It is a one-story wooden framed structure with a s T-shaped floor plan, which rests on a foundation of brick piers.

The Oak Grove School was built near, the Oak Grove Missionary Baptist Church. The local African American community raised US $1,400; the State of Alabama contributed $900; and the Julius Rosenwald Fund contributed $700 towards to building structure.

It was used as an elementary school until the 1960s, after which it was merged the nearby Sunshine School. The building is maintained by the Oak Grove Missionary Baptist Church, and is sometimes used for Sunday school.
