= Merritt School =

School in Bullock County, Alabama, US

- U.S. National Register of Historic Places
- Alabama Register of Landmarks and Heritage
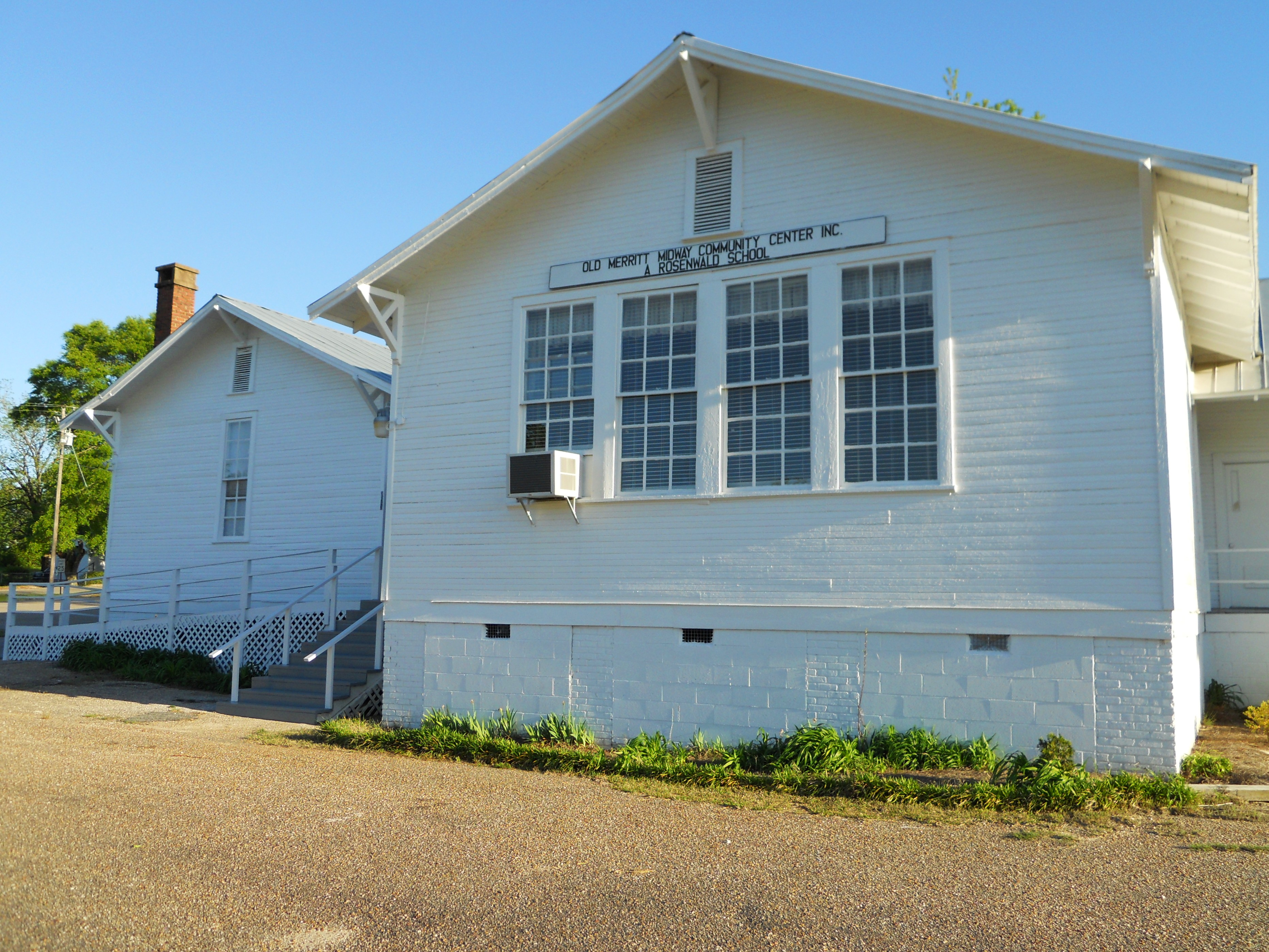

- Location within Alabama
- Location: Old Troy Rd., 0.5 miles south of U.S. Route 82, near Midway, Alabama
- Coordinates: 32°04′29″N 85°32′03″W
- Area: less than one acre
- Built: c.1922
- Architect: Samuel L. Smith
- MPS: The Rosenwald School Building Fund and Associated Buildings MPS
- NRHP reference No.: 98000110

Significant dates
- Added to NRHP: February 20, 1998
- Designated ARLH: November 2, 1990

The Merritt School, also known as the Old Merritt School and Midway Community Center, is a historic building and former two-room Rosenwald School for African American students in Bullock County, Alabama, United States, that was built around 1922.

It was listed on the National Register of Historic Places in 1998; and the Alabama Register of Landmarks and Heritage in 1990. It also has a historical marker erected 1998 by the Bullock County Historical Society and the Alabama Historical Association.

== History ==
The 2 acres (0.81 ha) of land for the school was sold by Margaret Elizabeth Merritt in 1921 for US $5 to the state of Alabama. The Merritt School building was designed by architect Samuel L. Smith's, following his own book Community School Plans (1924), a one-story frame building, built to standard Design No. 20 and No. 20-A for a two-teacher Rosenwald school. It was modified in c.1935, and in c.1946.

The local African American community raised $1,000, the State of Alabama contributed $800; and the Rosenwald Fund contributed $800 to build the school structure.

The heirs of Elizabeth Merritt sold adjoining lands for $1.00 to the State of Alabama in the 1960s, so they could modernize the school. The Merritt School continued to be used for educational purposes until it was renovated in 1978. It is now a community center.
