= Hope Hull (minister) =

American Methodist minister (1763–1818)

Hope Hull (March 13, 1763 – October 4, 1818) was an American minister. He was considered the founder of the Methodist Church in the U.S. state of Georgia.

He was born in Worcester County, Maryland, in 1763. Before being ordained a minister, he was a private in the Continental Army during the American Revolutionary War and a house carpenter of Baltimore. He organized Reheboth Academy in Wilkes County around the turn of the century. The school was "torn down not long after 1823" but in its day was "a large, nice, well built house" set by a grove of "fine trees" with no approaching avenue. Hope Hull settled in Athens, Georgia, around 1802 and was the Methodist minister there. The first Methodist church building in Athens, Georgia, was "a crude log cabin about 22 x 24 feet in size, presenting externally the appearance of a negro cabin without a chimney. This little place of worship was superseded in 1810 by a somewhat more commodious building in another location and known as 'Hull's Meeting House.'" He served as a trustee of the University of Georgia.

His sons were Asbury Hull, a lawyer and statesman in Georgia, and Henry Hull, a university professor.

Abner W. McGehee changed the name of a community in Alabama originally known as McGehee's Switch in honor of himself to Hope Hull in honor of the minister Hope Hull; the two had met while McGehee was living in Georgia.
