= List of Galactik Football episodes =

Galactik Football is a seventy-eight episode animated children's television series about a futuristic football team, co-produced by Alphanim and France 2 for Jetix Europe. The series comprised three seasons, and ran from 2006 to 2011

== Episodes ==
=== Season 1 ===
No. overall	No. in series	Title	Written by	Original release date	Prod. code
1	1	"The Comeback"	Laurent Turner	3 June 2006	101
Aarch the previous Akillian GF (Galactik Football) striker has a memory of his last football match when he takes a penalty but a freak snow and ice storm disrupts the game and the planet Akkilain is left in an ice age. Aarch has come back after 15 years to make a new team and try for the GF cup. Aarch meets a few unhappy people with his return, but a bunch of teens, are excited to hear of his return. Some guys are sent to deal with Aarch and his friend Clamp that very evening but they're saved by the group of teens who are glad to know of his arrival.
2	2	"A New Hope"	Sébastien Oursel and Guillaume Mautalent	4 June 2006	102
Aarch has disappeared. The hopes that his arrival raised among the young people of Akillian are quickly dashed. But Aarch must have come back for a reason. Rumor has it that he's going to start a new Galactik Football team on Akillian. If that's true, D'Jok, Thran, Ahito, and Micro-Ice just know that they'll be on the team.
3	3	"The Challenge"	Jeffrey Paul Kearney and Laurent Turner	10 June 2006	103
During the tests, Aarch is convinced that Tia and the others possess the Breath of Akillian. He still has one position to fill on his team, so he visits his brother to convince him to let Rocket (Aarch's nephew) play. The members of the Flux Society are concerned: if Aarch manages to revive the Breath after such a long time, what will be the consequences for Akillian?.
4	4	"The Team"	Laurent Turner	11 June 2006	104
The team that Aarch has put together has been approved and is now headed for the moon of Ibo. They'll be playing a friendly match against the legendary Wamba team, whose star attacker Lun Zaera is especially dangerous. D'Jok wonders why Tia is the only one who has the Breath. She seems to be guarding a secret.
5	5	"The Captain"	Laurent Turner	17 June 2006	105
Today the Snow Kids are up against the Red Tigers in a match that will decide which of the two teams is going to represent Akillian in the Galactik Football Cup. The police have taken Tia back to her parents. Will she miss this highly important match?.
6	6	"Second Wind"	Laurent Turner	18 June 2006	106
The Snow Kids are losing 3-0 against the Red Tigers at half-time. They have to win this match if they want to qualify. Will Tia's return be enough to turn the situation around? Not if Artegor Nexus has anything to say about it. Meanwhile, the Flux Society becomes increasingly interested in Clamp and continues its inquiry into his troubled past with Chris Shardlow, known to be the worst player in the multiverse.
7	7	"Coach's Pet"	Guillaume Mautalent, Sébastien Oursel, and Laurent Turner	24 June 2006	107
The tensions among the Snow Kids are making themselves felt: Micro-Ice is trying to get closer to Mei, but she has only one thing on her mind: becoming an attacker. As for Rocket, his teammates treat him with skepticism because they suspect that he had an easier time making it onto the team than they did. Worse yet, the Snow Kids have to deal with these awkward situations as they play the Rykers, one of the toughest teams in Galactik Football, which is known for its infamous metal yell.
8	8	"The Storm"	Laurent Turner	25 June 2006	108
While the Shadows-Pirates game is in full swing, Aarch looks for the captain of his team, but to no avail. Rocket has disappeared. Tia thinks she knows where he could be hiding, but an enormous snowstorm is brewing outside. Clamp, for his part, is getting more and more anxious and becomes increasingly prone to violent headaches. Dame Simbai is beginning to have doubts about Clamp's identity: who is he really?.
9	9	"Revenge Match"	Laurent Turner	1 July 2006	109
Dame Simbai has real doubts about Clamp's true identity, and even Aarch is beginning to worry about his friend's strange behavior. However, Aarch has other priorities: today the Snow Kids are playing the return match against the Rykers; if they lose this match, our young heroes will advance no further in the competition. Micro-Ice's thoughts, however, have turned to… Mei. He decides to declare his love for her at the end of the match.
10	10	"The Pirates"	Sébastien Oursel and Laurent Turner	2 July 2006	110
The Snow Kids are traveling to play another legendary team: the Pirates of Shiloe. Since the Pirates are always on the move and ready to respond to any possible attack by Technoid, anything could happen. Some of them might even get a glimpse of Sonny Blackbones in person. Micro-Ice, however, is very bitter: Mei is not responding to his overtures, and he's the only member of his team who has not yet experienced the Breath.
11	11	"The Professor"	Laurent Turner	8 July 2006	111
During the return match against the Pirates, Rocket is injured. Clamp is somewhat distracted as he follows the match, and who could blame him? Memories of his past work for Technoid are coming back to him. Meanwhile, the Flux Society discovers Clamp's true identity, and his current activity seems more and more suspicious to them. As for the Snow Kids, their training is becoming so intense that Aarch has cancelled all their free time.
12	12	"The Escape"	Sébastien Oursel and Laurent Turner	9 July 2006	112
While Clamp is being kidnapped by Technoid robots, Sonny escapes through the ventilation duct and winds up face to face with… Micro-Ice! Everyone at Aarch Academy is very worried: Aarch searches for Clamp, who suddenly reappears but looks very odd. D'Jok thinks he's the reason why his best friend left, and he goes to ask Maya to peer into her famous crystal ball. Meanwhile, Micro-Ice is living the life of a Pirate!.
13	13	"The Striker"	Sébastien Oursel and Laurent Turner	9 July 2006	113
Today the Snow Kids are up against the terrifying Shadows, and Micro-Ice still has not come back! Aarch is crazed with worry: how will they play the match without him?. D'Jok puts the blame on Mei, saying that it's her fault that Micro-Ice has left because she wanted to be an attacker! Micro-Ice's departure makes things uncomfortable among the team members, as does the clone of Clamp that Bleylock has sent to take the place of the real Clamp. The enemy is now within the very walls of the Academy.
14	14	"Black Hole"	Vincent Bonjour and Laurent Turner	16 July 2006	114
Micro-Ice's return is a relief to everyone, but Aarch had already made plans to replace him, because the Snow Kids are leaving immediately for the planet Shadows to play the return match! Since they didn't play all that well in first-leg match, the Snow Kids can kiss their dream good-bye if they lose. Meanwhile, Clamp's clone tries to extract MetaFlux from Thran's body. How will the Snow Kids play successfully under these conditions against Artegor's team, which is still gloating over his previous victory?.
15	15	"Last Chance"	Vincent Bonjour and Laurent Turner	17 July 2006	115
It's half time in the Snow Kids–Shadows match, and our young heroes have no energy left. They let the provocations of their opponents get to them, and Thran seems exhausted. They're losing 3-0. Only Rocket has managed to get his second wind. But how will he be able to win all by himself? Meanwhile, Clamp is still locked up in the Technoid laboratory and he tries to establish contact with the Academy. Can he do it?.
16	16	"Genesis Stadium"	Laurent Turner	24 July 2006	116
Things are beginning to get serious for our young heroes, and Aarch thinks that the time has come to have a frank discussion with them before they arrive at the immense Genesis Stadium, where the coming matches are to take place. The pressure is mounting: the eyes of sports journalists from all over the Galaxy are on them, but the Snow Kids are staying in a luxury hotel where they even have a butler named Djado to wait on them. These new and surprising conditions excite everyone, especially Mei, who has agreed to be a spokes-model for a brand of shampoo. But Tia has other things on her mind; armed with a photo of Rocket's mother, she goes to look for her.
17	17	"Get Ready"	Vincent Bonjour and Laurent Turner	24 July 2006	117
D'Jok has become the newest rising Galactik Football star, and he and his teammates are extremely confident before their upcoming match against the Wambas. For Aarch, however, no match is won in advance, and he's afraid that his protégés are deluding themselves. How does each teammate handle their new status? Has D'Jok really let all this fame go to his head?. Sonny and the Pirates, for their part, have discovered why MetaFlux is so extremely important, and they're ready to do whatever it takes to break into Clamp's laboratory.
18	18	"Under Pressure"	Guillaume Mautalent, Sébastien Oursel, and Laurent Turner	25 July 2006	118
The pressure is still mounting for our team. The match against the Wambas nearly turned into a complete fiasco, and the Snow Kids are still spreading themselves too thin. D'Jok really has let fame go to this head; even Micro-Ice doesn't recognize his friend anymore! Mei is being pressured by her mother to film new ads. And Tia has planned a surprise party for Rocket's birthday. Our carefree young heroes have no idea what terrible threat is weighing down on them.
19	19	"The Star"	Laurent Turner	26 July 2006	119
D'Jok is having a difficult time handling the pressure that has been placed on his young shoulders. The next match, in which the Snow Kids will be playing the Lightnings, is extremely important, as the Lightnings are the favorites to win the Cup! Will an impromptu visit from D'Jok's idol, Warren, change things? Clamp, who is still being held in a secret Technoid laboratory, is getting sicker and sicker. Bleylock offers him an antidote that will allow him to live, but demands the Snow Kids' Meta-Flux in exchange.
20	20	"Metaflux"	Guillaume Mautalent and Laurent Turner	27 July 2006	120
The Snow Kids have qualified for the semi-final, and the real Clamp is back! Unfortunately, he has some very bad news to report; MetaFlux can be very dangerous to the health of players that use it. In Clamp's opinion, the Snow Kids have two choices; win with the MetaFlux and put themselves in danger, or lose without it and preserve their health. Aarch lets his players make the decision, also D'Jok finds out that Sonny is his dad.
21	21	"The Forfeit"	Nadege Girardot, Guillaume Mautalent, Sébastien Oursel, and Laurent Turner	28 July 2006	121
Aarch and his players are in serious trouble. Without MetaFlux, our young heroes seem to be losing control of the Breath of Akillian. They have no chance of winning the match against the Technoid team. In the official boxes, Bleylock rubs his hands as he looks at D'Jok: he has just received a mysterious call that will allow him to follow through with his plan after all.
22	22	"The Missing Link"	Laurent Turner	29 July 2006	122
While the Pirate chief tries to put the MetaFlux in a safe place, D'Jok confesses to Micro-Ice that Sonny Blackbones is his father. Micro-Ice can hardly believe it. D'Jok's disappearance during the second semi-final between the Shadows and the Cyclopes makes Aarch crazed with worry. Would Artegor decide to eliminate the Snow Kids' best player?, Aarch decides to reassure himself.
23	23	"Blackmail"	Guillaume Mautalent, Sébastien Oursel, and Laurent Turner	30 July 2006	123
While almost all the parents have come to attend the party right before the final, D'Jok isolates himself. Mei can no longer approach him, and even the Pirates cannot convince him to speak to them. D'Jok is highly preoccupied, and who could blame him? If he wants to see his father alive again, the Snow Kids have to lose the final. Will D'Jok agree to throw the game? .
24	24	"The Duel"	Laurent Turner	30 July 2006	124
In the last moments before the final, Aarch is pessimistic about his team's chances of winning; Ahito is having nightmares, and Rocket is no longer speaking to Tia. D'Jok is the most troubled of all; if the Snow Kids win the final, his father Sonny will die!, Sinedd seems to know about this terrible dilemma and makes D'Jok an offer. Meanwhile, the Pirates and Clamp are trying to find Sonny.
25	25	"The Traitor"	Laurent Turner	31 July 2006	125
The Snow Kids are just minutes away from the long-awaited moment that they have for which worked so hard and suffered so much; the Galactik Football Cup final!. Will D'Jok really throw the game to save his father? Will Maya manage to convince him not to?. Will the Pirates ally themselves with Technoid to save Sonny?.
26	26	"The Cup"	Laurent Turner	1 August 2006	126
Everyone in Genesis Stadium is holding their breath; D'Jok is going to shoot the free kick that will tie the score and put the Snow Kids back on an even footing with their opponents in the Galactik Football Cup final!. Aarch is terrified; he can no longer contact his players, and he now knows that D'Jok wants to sabotage the game so that he can save his father!. D'Jok is completely worn out. Can he really pretend to miss this shot? Does he really have a choice?. The Pirates have just arrived where Bleylock is holding Sonny prisoner!.

=== Season 2 ===
No. overall	No. in series	Title	Original release date	Prod. code
27	1	"Return to Genesis"	5 April 2008	201
Four years after their triumphant victory in the Galactik Football Cup, the Snow Kids return to Genesis Stadium and prepare to do it again. But all is not well with the team. Ahito has a mysterious illness, and may have to return to Akillian. Yuki, Ahito's attractive cousin, comes to tryout for his position. Rocket and Tia go to the off-limits Genesis Forest and find only trouble…
28	2	"The Suspension"	6 April 2008	202
Rocket saves Tia's life in Genesis Forest, but to do it, he uses The Breath – a violation of League rules. Yuki becomes the new Snow Kids' goalkeeper to the joy of Micro-Ice who is smitten with her… After Addim tells Aarch of the illegal use of The Breath, Rocket admits that he did it. Aarch has no choice but to suspend Rocket indefinitely. Rocket doesn't stick around long. Now D'Jok is sure the Cup is slipping away… But before Rocket can go back to Akillian, Sinedd makes him an interesting offer.
29	3	"A Team Reinvented"	12 April 2008	203
Aarch searches for a replacement for Rocket, but it's not easy. Rocket is irreplaceable. D'Jok suggests Mark from Akillian to step in. Tia worries about Rocket whom she thinks has returned to Akillian. Sinedd introduces Rocket to Netherball – a dangerous one-on-one football match played inside The Sphere where there are "no rules". However there seems to be dark powers behind this forbidden sport… including Duke Maddox's assistant Harris! Aarch asks Artegor for a "friendly" with the Shadows, which pleases Artegor. Clamp thinks he sees General Bleylock, but that's impossible… Bleylock is dead, isn't he?
30	4	"The New Captain"	13 April 2008	204
Clamp tells Sonny that he saw Bleylock alive. Sonny doesn't believe it, but he's taking no chances. He and his pirates return to Genesis. Aarch makes D'Jok the new captain of the Snow Kids in Rocket's absence; Tia takes it badly… The "friendly" between the Snow Kids and The Shadows is very unfriendly, both on and off the pitch. D'Jok fights with his teammates taking his new role as captain a bit too far.
31	5	"The Homecoming"	19 April 2008	205
The Snow Kids go home to Akillian to surprise Ahito who is there recovering from his illness. The big news is Ahito's coming back to Genesis with the Snow Kids, but he's still not ready to play. On Akillian, Clamp has the Snow Kids play against their own clones. Tia visits Norata and Kyra, but Rocket's not there. He never came to Akillian! But where is he? Norata and Kyra decide to return to Genesis with the team to look for Rocket. Unknown to the others, in the lower levels of Genesis, Rocket tries out Netherball… He's found his new home in The Sphere.
32	6	"Netherball Rules!"	20 April 2008	206
Back on Genesis, Norata blames Aarch for Rocket's disappearance. Tia fights with D'Jok because she thinks he doesn't care about Rocket as he's too happy being "the new captain". Yuki has doubts about her ability; is she good enough to be a Snow Kid? Micro-Ice takes Yuki to the Luna Genesis amusement park – but Ahito, Thran and Mark crash Micro-Ice's plans! Rocket plays the Rykers's star Kernor - the current Netherball champion - in a brutal one-on-one match! Will she remain in The Sphere?
33	7	"Doubts Within"	26 April 2008	207
D'Jok has a nightmare about a match in Genesis Stadium, but he brushes it off. The Snow Kids go to Addim saying that Rocket should not be suspended. Addim tells them they must wait and see what the League decides. It's announced that D'Jok will replace Rocket on the All-Star Team, but D'Jok seems a bit too happy about it. Mei reminds him of the real problem…Rocket is still missing. Micro-Ice falls for Yuki but does his best to avoid her – it's not easy! Tia helps Norata and Kyra look for Rocket, but it's an impossible task – Genesis is huge. Ahito trains for the first time with the others…but Dame Simbai still worries about this health. He's not ready. Harris tells Sinedd to keep Rocket in The Sphere, and not to play against him. Sinedd is not sure to follow his orders…
34	8	"Rocket's decent."	27 April 2008	208
Plunging into the world of Netherball, Rocket plays Woowamboo of the Wambas. Will Rocket keep control of The Sphere? Sonny tells his men they need to find Rocket. Rocket may lead them to Bleylock… if Bleyok is alive. In a hidden lab, Bleylock shows Harris what's really behind Netherball… they are capturing the players' powerful flux from The Sphere!! But why? Clamp and Dame Simbai think the "new Snow Kids" are ready for the tournament. It won't be long now.
35	9	"The All-Stars"	3 May 2008	209
D'Jok continues to have his nightmares… but Micro-Ice assures him he's just nervous before the All-Stars match. The Snow-Kids watch the match on the Holo-TV: the All-Stars vs. the Technodroids V3s… Luur of the Xenons is very impressive; his flux, the Heat of Xenon is one of the most powerful forces in the galaxy. Aarch - the All-Star team coach - struggles with Sineed, but Warren rallies the team on. D'Jok plays well, but Micro-Ice has doubts about the Snow-Kids's success in the upcoming matches. Mark and the rest of the team tell him where to go! The young pirate Arty overhears the former Wambas players Wolfen and Zoran talking about Rocket… and something called "Netherball"…What could it be?
36	10	"Rocket vs Sinedd"	4 May 2008	210
Against the wishes of Bleylock and Harris, Sinedd plays Rocket in a rough match of Netherball. Will Sinedd control The Sphere? After the match Warren tries to bring Rocket back "upstairs", but Rocket is happy playing Netherball. Tia is impatient with the League… there's still no news on Rocket's suspension. Aarch tells Ahito that he cannot play in the first match; he's not strong enough. Yuki will have to replace him. The pirates Arty and Bennett follow Wolfen and Zoran into the lower levels of Genesis Stadium… where they discover the dark world of Netherball and Rocket!! Sonny is sure that Technoid is behind it…and maybe even Bleylock!
37	11	"The Champions Stumble"	10 May 2008	211
Yuki has a "goalkeeper nightmare". She tells Mark that she's worried about today's match against the Wambas. Tia's father informs his daughter that Rocket never left Genesis Stadium. But where is he? Harris sneaks into Addim's office and places a video file on her computer to keep Rocket playing Netherball. The League votes to delay Rocket's return to the GFC thanks to Harris! Sonny and Corso inspect The Sphere, but find no clues to its true function. Early in the match with the Wambas, the Snow Kids are losing… Could the Snow Kids be eliminated in their first match!!
38	12	"Last Stand"	11 May 2008	212
The Snow Kids are trailing the Wambas at the half, and the team is very depressed. Especially D'Jok. It looks bad for our champions. Suddenly Ahito comes back and subs for Yuki in the second half! Aarch pushes the Snow Kids to "win the match for Ahito". Can the Snow Kids turn it around with Ahito in goal? While searching the League's computers Arty spots the fake video file about Rocket in Addim's computer – Sonny is very interested…so is Addim. Addim tells Aarch that Rocket will not be suspended and can play in the tournament again…but where is he? Mark has a secret, but he's too afraid to tell anyone… he knows where Rocket is.
39	13	"Fluxless"	17 May 2008	213
Mark tells Aarch and the team about Rocket and Netherball. The Snow Kids are shocked. Sonny and his pirates meet with Clamp and tell him about The Sphere. Clamp thinks the flux could be invisible… but how and why? The Shadows/Pirates match begins… and Sinedd is a force of nature. He's never played so well, despite playing with a Netherball injury. Bleylock orders his robots in a spacecraft to fire a flux device at the Shadows planet causing a huge explosion! On the pitch at Genesis, the Shadows suddenly lose their flux, the Smog!! The Pirates easily beat the Shadows 7-2. Sonny smells trouble… he and Corso leave Genesis Stadium immediately, but the Technoid robots arrest them in the Astroport! Sonny's a wanted man, again. Mark takes the Snow Kids to The Sphere to see Rocket… Tia is speechless. Could that really be Rocket?
40	14	"New Order"	26 July 2008	214
Sonny and Corso escape arrest by Technoid's robots thanks to Arty and Bennett's clever trick. The pirates blast away from Genesis aboard the Black Manta just in time... But Sonny and his gang are blamed for the explosion on the Shadows planet, and the Pirates GF team is disqualified. Artegor falls ill due to the lack of the Smog; Aarch takes him to Dame Simbai for treatment. Rocket plays Luur in Netherball in a wicked obstacle match. The Snow Kids are shocked to see "the new Rocket"…especially Tia. He's a different person. D'Jok tells Rocket that he can play GF again, but Rocket tells him he's never coming back. Tia is devastated. Bleylock and Harris are thrilled that Sonny Blackbones is on the run again… but why are they still collecting the flux?
41	15	"Revelations"	27 July 2008	215
Aarch is amazed to hear Rocket isn't coming back to the Snow Kids. He sends D'Jok and Mark down to convince him. Tia discovers that Technoid is holding her parents prisoners as they were witnesses to the Shadows planet explosion. Mei promises to help… she introduces Tia to her special friend - Corso! Sonny meets with D'Jok to assure him of his innocence. D'Jok believes him. The Xenons and the Cyclops play in the quarterfinals. Luur uses his flux, the Heat of Xenon to deadly results. Sonny agrees to help Tia on one condition – her parents must tell the galaxy of his innocence. Tia is fine with that, but she's coming along with the pirates, or it's no deal!
42	16	"New Rules"	2 August 2008	216
Micro-Ice has a nightmare about playing in Genesis Stadium… Clamp contacts Sonny aboard the Black Manta. Dame Simbai informs him that the explosion on the Shadows planet was a flux device! Sonny now knows what's behind Netherball. The Sphere is the key… Bleylock is mixing the players's flux… creating a powerful weapon. Aarch announces the new assistant coach for the Snow Kids – Artegor Nexus! Artegor quickly whips the Snow Kids into shape by putting Yuki in Tia's vacant position. Artegor and D'Jok are not friends, but Artegor does seem to want to help the captain of the Snow Kids. In space, Tia, Sonny and his gang approach the Technoid prison barge…but how will they get in?
43	17	"Open Doors"	3 August 2008	217
Tia is taken prisoner with Sonny and his pirates aboard the Technoid prison barge. She spots her parents in a nearby cell – but how will Tia rescue them and herself? The Snow Kids play the Rykers in the quarterfinals match, but Rocket has not come back and Tia is with the pirates! Luckily Yuki and Mark fill in, but will they be enough to beat the mighty Rykers?
44	18	"Warren Steps In"	9 August 2008	218
Rocket still has not returned to the Snow Kids, and Aarch is worried. D'Jok competes in the Big Kicks Challenge in Genesis Stadium with Warren, Luur, Lun-Zaera and other GF stars. Suddenly a familiar voice booms from the Genesis Stadium screens – it's Sonny! The pirates hack into the Holo-TV network to broadcast a special report of their own! Tia returns to the Snow Kids after her successful rescue mission with the pirates. Sonny and Clamp tap into The Sphere and discover that it siphons off the players's flux giving Bleylock limitless power!! D'Jok and Mark (and secretly Tia) go back down to watch Warren play Rocket in a brutal Netherball match with obstacles… Can Warren beat Rocket and get him out of The Sphere for good?
45	19	"The Technodroid V3s"	10 August 2008	219
The Lightnings and the Technodroids V3s battle it out in their quarterfinals match. Who will advance in the finals? Arty and Bennett find Bleylock's secret lab! Yuki warms up to Micro-Ice… to his shock. But they're late for practice… again. The Snow Kids train against the Xenons holo-players… they know if they ever play this team, it will be a very hard match. D'Jok goes down to play Rocket in Netherball, but someone steps in his way…
46	20	"The Fallen Star"	16 August 2008	220
Tia bravely enters the Netherball Sphere to play Rocket… but Rocket's too far gone. He's too wrapped up in the sport to know it's even her. He's seeing things. Rocket plays harder than ever. Can Rocket be beaten? Will Tia survive the match? Arty and Bennett follow Sinedd to Bleylock's hideout, but will they finally trap Bleylock? Aarch welcomes Rocket back to team, but not very warmly. The Snow Kids haze Rocket a bit… but everyone is very happy to see him. Is Rocket really himself again? Will Tia ever forgive him?
47	21	"Coach Artegor"	17 August 2008	221
The Snow Kids are thrilled to have Rocket back, but Rocket is shocked to see Artegor coaching. In the holotrainer, it's clear that Rocket's not ready to play with the team; he plays too selfishly. After the Shadow's flux, the Smog, returns, Artegor gets his wish: The Shadow play the Xenons in their semifinals match. Sinedd shows signs of illness from the Smog… Can Artegor and Sinedd beat the invincible Xenons?
48	22	"Rocket, The Midfielder"	23 August 2008	222
Against Maya's wishes, D'Jok plays in the Snow Kids semifinals match with the Lightnings. But on the pitch, Ahito falters… could he still be sick? As halftime approaches the Snow Kids are trailing. Aarch is not sure that his team wants to win. Deep inside of Genesis, Harris visits a Technoid vault and removes the flux devices… but why?
49	23	"Destiny"	24 August 2008	223
It's the second half of the semifinals match between the Snow Kids and the Lightnings…and the Snow Kids are losing, 2-0. Rocket rallies the team to everyone's surprise, and thanks to D'Jok's great idea, the Snow Kids fight back. However, Ahito continues to hide his illness, and insists on playing. Can the Snow Kids beat the amazing Lightnings and advance to the finals?
50	24	"Final Preparations"	31 August 2008	224
While staking out the Astroport, Arty and Bennett spot Bleylock!! Sonny finds him in an alley, but Bleylock is not a man to be caught easily. Now Sonny knows Bleylock's true intentions – to destroy Genesis Stadium!!! But how will Sonny stop him? During training the Snow Kids are less focused than they should be… they're too excited about the coming final match with the Xenons. But worse their parents are at Genesis expecting a night out with their football star children. However, the Snow Kids have their own plans…
51	25	"A Team Unravels"	31 August 2008	225
Cup finals fever has hit Genesis Stadium. Despite the Snow Kids being the current champions, the odds are on the Xenons and their power flux, the Heat of Xenon. But no one expects the stunt Luur pulls on the pitch at Genesis! Can the Snow Kids focus on the match and not on Luur's game? Meanwhile, Arty and Bennett find Bleylock but lose the flux devices… in Luna Genesis!! Will Bennett find the flux devices and stop the total destruction of Genesis Stadium?
52	26	"Bleylocks Revenge"	6 September 2008	226
Snow Kids play the second half time against Xenons. D'Jok manages to tie the result to 2:2. Meanwhile, Sonny, Corso and Artie chase Bleylock. Bleylock sends an army of Technoids to distract them while he gets into the spaceship from which he is going to fire the flux devices and destroy Genesis. However, Sonny shot the ropes holding a giant block, which fell down and destroyed all Technoids. Sonny, Corso and Artie get onto the pirate ship which chases Bleylock's ship. They try to shoot down Bleylock's ship using lasers, but the ship is equipped with shields. However, when Bleylock tries to fire the flux devices, he realizes that his assistant Harris betrayed him by blocking the flux devices and planting a bomb into the ship. The bomb explodes and destroys Bleylock, but the flux devices created a huge explosion which destroyed the pitch on the Genesis. D'Jok's nightmare comes true when he falls from the edge of the destroyed pitch, but Luur saves his life. Since it is a draw and they can't continue to play on the half-destroyed pitch, they decide to play the penalty shootout. While defending a Xenon player's shot, Yuki breaks her leg, so Ahito has to take her place as the goalkeeper. Luckily, he manages to defend Luur's shot. Rocket scored the winning goal, and Snow Kids have once again won the cup. At the end, Harris is shown, placing a flux device into the Technoid office, saying to the flux device that one day they will rule the galaxy.

=== Season 3 ===
No. overall	No. in series	Title	Original release date	Prod. code
53	1	"Stars in Danger"	5 July 2010	301
The Snow Kids are on Akillian practicing for their upcoming friendly match against the Shadows. But they play without conviction and Aarch lets them know it. When explosions at Genesis Stadium sever the contact with Mei, who was participating from a distance, D'Jok worries for her. But he discovers that she wasn't actually on Genesis! This lie sours the mood, even more as it appears that Sonny, D'Jok's father, was responsible for the attacks… But an intergalactic press release catches the Snow Kids' attention. A mysterious character, Lord Phoenix, is organizing an incredible mixed-Flux tournament on his planet, Paradisia. This announcement leaves the team in a state of uncertainty, as they wonder if they should participate or not…
54	2	"The Break-up"	6 July 2010	302
Mei still can't be found but then suddenly appears on Arcadia Sports along with… Sinedd! She announces that she is joining the Shadows and will participate in the Paradisia tournament!! Rocket, seeing his uncle a little baffled by this unexpected announcement, asks Artegor Nexus to help the Snow Kids prepare for the tournament on Paradisia. Greeted in person on Paradisia by the mysterious Lord Phoenix, the Snow Kids are enthralled! But Rocket has a bad feeling…
55	3	"Welcome to Paradisia"	7 July 2010	303
The Snow Kids discover Paradisia and notice that Lord Phoenix didn't skimp on expenses. Villas, practice rooms, two stadiums…this promises to be a luxurious tournament! In addition, Lord Phoenix hopes to equip Paradisia with its own Flux, but the mysterious Vega reminds him that this has a price… The teams are looking for new stars, including the Snow Kids, since Mei has joined the Shadows. On the beach, Rocket can't take his eyes off Lun-Zia, an athletic Wambas player. Yuki is recruited by the Elektras and D'Jok realizes that Mei's move to the Shadows wasn't simply an impulsive decision…
56	4	"A New Strategy"	8 July 2010	304
In space, Sonny and his pirates are being chased by the Paradisia security forces. While D'Jok receives a tempting offer from Lord Phoenix, Aarch and Artegor, like football Gods of yore, join the Snow Kids practice session to show them how it's done! Phoenix starts to have regrets about his deal with the scheming Vega… He decides to send a coded message, which is intercepted
57	5	"Resonance"	4 September 2010	305
While Rocket and Tia are jogging on the beach, they meet Nikki 4, one of the players on the mysterious Team Paradisia! Rocket finds her to be very strange… After D'Jok leaves the team, Artegor gives the captain's bracelet to…Rocket! But while practicing the Breath of Akillian, Rocket suddenly collapses to the ground! Will he be able to play in the much-anticipated opening match of the Paradisia All-Star tournament? Inside his underwater laboratory, Vega threatens to reveal Phoenix's real identity to the world…
58	6	"May the Show Begin!"	11 September 2010	306
Tia goes to the clinic to see Rocket, but when she arrives she discovers that he has already gone to the beach with…Lun-Zia! Since Yuki has left the team, Micro-Ice has finally decided to tell her he's in love with her, but things don't turn out exactly as he had hoped… As the Shadows/Rykers and Elektras/Cyclops matches take place simultaneously at Deep Stadium and Dome Stadium, the pirates are caught in the "Phoenix Corporation" control room. Sonny discovers Lord Phoenix's real identity, but then Vega leaps out on Sonny and is about to get rid of him for good…
59	7	"Fathers and Sons"	18 September 2010	307
While Sonny, rescued by his pirates, remains in grave condition, D'Jok and the Snow Kids are preparing for their matches: Team Paradisia versus the Wambas, and the Snow Kids versus the Pirates! The Snow Kids are predicted to lose… Will they be able to silence their critics? It might be difficult, especially if Rocket collapses during the match. And will D'Jok be able to find his place on Team Paradisia? When Clamp notifies him of his father's condition, he goes to his bedside…
60	8	"The Other Side of Paradisia"	25 September 2010	308
On Paradisia, two exciting matches will pit the Xenons versus the Technodroids V4 and the Lightnings versus the "other" Akillian team, the Red Tigers. To everyone's surprise, the Red Tigers seem to have found the Breath! Warren is very weak at the end of the Lightnings match…he appears to suffer from the same malaise as Rocket. Unfortunately, Dame Simbai can't seem to find a cure for it… During the Glowing Coral Festival on the beach, the pirates tail Vega, who boards a mini-submarine. At the same time, someone sneaks into the Snow Kids clinic, where Sonny lies, unconscious…
61	9	"The Secret of Deep Stadium"	10 October 2011	309
Artie and Bennett trail Vega and end up at Deep Stadium. There they learn that Phoenix is drawing the flux from all the players, but before they can report to the Pirates, Phoenix captures them and throws them in prison. The Xenons take on the Snow Kids in a quarterfinal match. Rocket plays all out, but with the Resonance affecting him, there is a danger that could cause him to collapse at any time. In another quarterfinal match D'Jok and Team Paradisia battle Warren and the Lightnings. The Snow Kids manage to prevail with a 1:0 win thanks to a last minute goal by Tia. D'Jok and Warren both play ball control and manage to score, but Team Paradisa walks away with a 2:1 win to advance. After the match D'Jok reveals he knows Phoenix might have something to do with his dad's suffering and threatens to quit the team if Sonny doesn't recover. Sonny recovers and returns to try and stop the multi-flux plan, and Aarch learns that Artegor is dating the woman he wants to court, Adium.
62	10	"Friends and Enemies"	11 October 2011	310
Sonny reveals that Phoenix is Magnus Blade. Vega plants the multi-flux into the core of Paradisa and causes earthquakes throughout the planet. Sinedd reveals his parents died during the earlier flux war and that he has never seen them, but they mysteriously reappear. The photos and knowledge they have seem to indicate they are the real deal, but is this all a setup to lower Sineed's pride? Phoenix is told that Paradisia will explode within the week if multi-flux continues to be pumped into the core. The first semifinal is held between the Shadows and the Elektras. Yuki plays her heart out and even leaves the goal to strike offensively. Mei hesitates and takes easy shots during the game, but Sinedd is ruthless. Yuki re-injures herself, and the Shadows walk away with a 3:1 win to advance to the final. While investigating the Deep Dome, many of the Snow Kids get sucked inside leaving Thran on the surface to wonder what is going on.
63	11	"Battle for the Final"	12 October 2011	311
Tia and Mice learn of the multi-flux and try to help break the pirates out of Deep Dome. Sonny and Corso learn of Thran above Deep Dome and learn how Tia and Mice disappeared. They infiltrate Deep Dome and blow up the control panel so multi-flux can't be drawn from the players. After fighting in the previous episode, Aarch forgives Artegor and puts friendship first. The Snow Kids parents visit Paradisa to help relax their kids before the second semifinal match. D'Jok's mom, Maya, meets Sinedd and sees visions of his past. She comes to the conclusion that the people with him aren't Sinedd's parents, but she fails to share the information before being whisked away. The second semifinal takes place between the Snow Kids and Team Paradisia. After getting out to a quick 2:0 lead, Mark, Mice, and rocket score within a 3 minute period to give the Snow Kids a 3:2 halftime lead. D'Jok decides to pass the ball to his teammates instead of hogging the ball in the second half, and Paradisia gets the tying goal within the final minute of regulation. The episode ends with a 3:3 tie and penalty kicks upcoming. D'Jok is questioned about Ahito's weakness as goalie. Will he spill the secret, or will the penalty shootout be played clean and fair?
64	12	"Betrayal on the Field"	13 October 2011	312
D'Jok refuses to betray Ahito, so Phoenix hypnotizes him. The penalty kicks begin. Rocket misses the first kick before collapsing. After Ahito makes the first save, the Paradisian cyborgs activate the hypnosis and force D'Jok to reveal Ahito's weakness. The end result is a 4:3 win for Team Paradisia. Seeing the team depressed, the Akillian parents decide to have a party to cheer up their kids. Elsewhere Sonny corners Phoenix and forces him to reveal that multi-flux is in the core. It is believed Paradisia will be stable for a week, but the flux council head, Brim Simbra, arrives and deems that Paradisia must be evacuated for everyone to be safe. Unknown to the group, Vega is camouflaged and is playing everything directly to her employer.
65	13	"Endgame"	14 October 2011	313
After much consultation, it is agreed that the final should take place. It is revealed that Vega's employer is supposed to come watch the final with Phoenix himself, so the Pirates and the Flux Committee set up a trap to try and capture him. Rocket and Tia return to Akillian before the championship so Rocket can regain his strength. The championship begins. The teams battle to a 2:0 Halftime score. A robotic cat approaches Magnus Blade. A hologram of Harris comes out and thanks Magnus Blade (Lord Phoenix) for playing right into his trap. He now has enough multi-flux to destroy the universe, and Paradisia will be the first to fall. The pirates pursue the cat, leading to a rematch between Vega and Sonny. Massive earthquakes begin to rock Paradisia's surface. All Galactik Football players are authorized to use their fluxes to help everyone evacuate the planet. Everyone appears to make it off the planet except for Lord Phoenix, who determines he will go with Paradisia to hell. However Brim Simbra is dragged down to Paradisia's core with no one knowing that he has fallen. Harvey the robot is also left behind. As the Snow Kids and their families race as the last ones away from Paradisia, a gigantic light is seen erupting from Paradisia. The shock wave from the blast catches the Snow Kids ship in its path.
66	14	"A New Start"	15 October 2011	314
The Snow Kids survive the blast and return to Akillian. Things don't look as bright for Brim Simbra, former head of the Flux Committee, and Lord Phoenix though. The two are officially declared dead. With no resonance to worry about, Rocket begins to regain his strength. Artegor decides to leave The Snow Kids permanently and starts to work with Arcadia Sports. Warren is brought in to help train the Snow Kids and get them ready for the next Galactik Football Cup. D'Jok, no longer with Team Paradisia or The Snow Kids, finds a group of kids in the woods each with the ability to use the flux. They ask D'Jok if he will teach them how to play. Sonny invades Technoid and reveals the truth about Harris. However Sonny insists he remain on the most wanted list so Harris doesn't know he's now being hunted. Brim Balarius is made the new head of the flux committee. As they discuss the danger to the universe, Harris introduces himself via hologram and demands they move up the start of the next Galactik Football championship. Seeing no other choice, the Flux Committee contacts Adium and asks her to make the announcement.
67	15	"Crossed Fates"	16 October 2011	315
In order to participate in the Galactik Football Cup, all teams are required to use the same flux as the planet they represent. This means Lun-Zia must learn the Breath, Mei must learn the Smog, and Yuki must learn the Wave. The practices are made more and more intense as Aarch enters the holostadium to show how the breath can make him strong enough to defeat The Snow Kids since he knows all their moves. Special Breath training is given to Rocket, Tia, and Ahito to allow them to become faster by relaying on the Breath instead of their own skills. After learning the Smog, Mei decides she can't tolerate the sickness it will cause and decides to depart back for Akillian. Before leaving, Mei visits D'Jok, who has started up football classes for young kids in the Genesis Forest. D'Jok says he will never return after betraying the Snow Kids, but he wishes Mei the best. Lun-Zia tries to master the breath, but she can't get past her native Flux. Lun-Zia is forced to leave the team, opening a spot up for the returning Mei, but she receives good news as the Wambas invite her to join their squad and participate in the Cup. Meanwhile Team Paradisia gets a new captain and a new coach in Nikki 4. Nina 8 is brought on board to replace D'Jok. The fans rally around Team Paradisia. Adium announces that Team Paradisia will receive one of the wild card spots for the Cup, and she announces a first round match between The Snow Kids and The Wambas. An interview with Yuki is also shown in which she announces she will stay on board with Elektras and participate with them during the upcoming Cup. The end of the episode reveals Team Paradisia is now controlled by Harris, who plans on using the multi-flux in ways never before imagined during the upcoming tournament.
68	16	"The Secrets of the Breath"	17 October 2011	316
Dame Senbai takes the Snow Kids back to the first stadium they practiced at to teach them about controlling and reserving The Breath for when it is needed. The early match results are shown, and the Shadows win their first game of the Cup 3:0 behind two goals from Sinedd. Warren approaches D'Jok about the youth training classes and reveals he was the one who approached Artegor about doing the same thing. Mei reveals herself to her teammates as they board the shuttle. D'Jok attends the game in the stands. Artegor provides analysis commentary for the match. the Snow Kids try to reserve the breath during the first half and find themselves down 2:1 after Mice scores the first goal for the Snow Kids. Lun-Zia puts all her strength into attacking, but Mei continues to come up with the big steals. The Snow Kids focus the second half of attacking. Tia evens the score at 2, and a free penalty kick to rocket results into a trick pass to mark who gives the Snow Kids the 3:2 win. Thran decides to help Sidney build a receiver to see if Harvey is on another planet. Afterwards Clamp contacts Sonny and reveals the news that Harris is after the Cup because it controls all the flux in the universe. He also proposes creating an antidote to the Multi-flux, but in order to do so they must first find a sample of the multi-flux.
69	17	"Reconstituted Families"	18 October 2011	317
D'Jok, Warren, and Artegor start Club Galactik, a youth camp teaching all the basics of Galactik Football but without the emphasis on heavy practice. Two matches are shown- the Pirates vs. the Red Tigers and the Cyclops vs. Team Paradisia. Harris sends robots to trail D'Jok and keep him and Sonny from interfering. Sonny convinces D'Jok that he needs to rejoin the Snow Kids. The quarterfinal matches are announced: Zenons vs. Rykers, Paradisia vs. Lightning, Pirates vs. Electras, and Snow Kids vs. Shadows. Sinedd's parents are revealed to be con-artist who specialize in getting wealth off of famous figures by claiming to be their lost parents at the local Arkillian Restaurant.
70	18	"Sinedd's Shadow"	19 October 2011	318
A press conference is held announcing that D'Jok has rejoined the Snow Kids. Mei learns that Sinedd's parents were fake and begins to feel sorry for him. Sinedd plays all out in the first half and gives the Shadows a 2:1 lead. D'Jok replaces Rocket in the second half and begins to prove he is a team player. He saves a goal when Ahito flies the wrong way and gets passes made to Mice. The Snow Kids walk away with a 3:2 in to advance. Mark sneaks off to visit Nina 8 on a date. Maya goes to face the fake parents and reveals she knows that Sinedd's real parents are alive and that the fakes will help her find them if they know what's good for them. Harvey, the robot, picks up the signal from the Snow Kids and reveals he is alive on Paradisia with a human friend. Thran runs to tell Clamp this news and sees him discussing information with Sonny. Clamp makes him reveal the message from Harvey, and what shocks them all is Harvey is alive on Paradisia with a human friend. When Clamp reveals he thinks he has the anti-multi-flux ready, he states that he needs a regular multi-flux to test it on. Since Harvey is alive on Paradisia and Paradisia is the only planet they can get a sample of multi-flux from, Sonny decides to head back to Paradisia to investigate further.
71	19	"The Ghost of Paradisia"	20 October 2011	319
Clamp decides to go to Paradisia with Sonny to make sure they get the correct sample of multi-flux and to find Harvey's signal. Thran decides to stowaway on Sonny's ship to find Harvey, but the sneaky reporter follows him. The second quarterfinal between the Lightning and Team Paradisia takes place. Warren and the Lightning use speed and height to get a 2:0 Halftime lead, but Team Paradisia shares their knowledge of play from the first half and decides to use quick passes and increase their speed in the second half. Paradisia comes back with goals from Alca 1, Nikki 4, and Nina 8. In space the pirates open the space bridge but can't get the exit open. Thran comes out of his hiding place and tells them to reverse the entry code to escape. Back at the stadium Nikki 4 tells Nina 8 to focus on the plan and stop sneaking out to visit Mark. Mark's heart gets broken by Nina while D'Jok acts like he's trying to remember about Paradisia being cyborgs. On Paradisia Sonny and company land. Sonny takes a chance when he sees grass on the ground and learns the air is breathable. they begin there search for Harvey and his human companion.
72	20	"Walk for a Pirate"	21 October 2011	320
Sonny and company begin looking for the human survivor on Paradisia. They quickly find him at the Snow Kids Villa. The survivor is none other than Magnus Blade. He explains how his shield protected him from the flux blast and how he and Harvey met. At the Galactic Stadium Mice tries to arrange a secret visit with Yuki but gets caught by his other girlfriend. He works things out with her, and the two agree to spend the afternoon together, with one of the events being the Pirates/ Elektras quarterfinal game. Highlights are shown of the Zenons/ Rykers quarterfinal game. the Zenons advanced 3:2. The Pirates get out to a 1:0 lead early on, but the Elektras tie it just before Halftime with a goal from Yuki. The Elektras use their flux to their advantage in the second half, and the Pirates lose 3:1. The semifinals are announced as Elektras/ Team Paradisia and The Snow Kids/ The Zenons. Back on Paradisia Magnus Blade leads them to the central core chamber, but when they break down the door one of Blades own robots begins attacking them with the order to kill all intruders on site.
73	21	"Farewell, Paradisia"	22 October 2011	321
The Pirates capture Blade's robot and force him to reveal all of Harris's plans from the Paradisia Tournament. Clamp opens the planet core's hatch to get a sample of multi-flux, and out comes Brim Simbra. Simbra provides a piece of multi-flux to Sonny so they can test the anti-multi-flux before collapsing. At the Galactik Stadium the Snow Kids must endure two training sessions, including one with Warren and Artegor at Club Galactick. The team is taught what it truly means to be one as they are stuck together as pairs of two and forced to run as one. At the Arkillian Restaurant Adium breaks up with Aarch after declaring her love for him. Her reasoning is that the entire system would be put at risk if she was shown favoring one team, but she promises to wait for Aarch. Mice also tries to cheer up Mark after he learns that it is girl problems causing Mark's depression. The episode ends with the pirates escaping Paradisia with Magnus Blade agreeing to help them overthrow Harris for what he did to Paradisia. In the escape from the planet Brim Simbra gets Sonny to promise he won't let the Multi-flux enter the cup. If it does, it will destroy all flux's in the galaxy. Brim Simbra passes away, and the Snow Kids/ Zenons semifinal match has its opening face-off.
74	22	"All Together!"	23 October 2011	322
The Snow Kids battle the Zenons in the first semifinal. Luur and the Zenons target rocket, who is playing defense, with a ball control scheme and gain an early 1:0 lead. The Snow Kids steal the ball and use a team attack with Mei rushing up from defense to tie the score at 1:1 going into Halftime. The Pirates return Thran and Clamp to the Snow Kids at Halftime. Thran changes into his uniform. rocket is given a penalty kick to put the Snow Kids up 2:1. Afterwards he's replaced by Thran. Thran uses the breath and goes after every ball. His movements completely change the Snow Kids defense. Tia and D'Jok manage to each score, and the Snow Kids advance to the championship with a 4:1 win. Harris learns that Sonny is back and that Magnus Blade is alive, so he puts Team Paradisia in lockdown mode. At the celebration party, Maya enlists the help of Tia's father to find Sinedd's parents. Adium defies her own words and sneaks out to see Aarch, but Sharky catches them kissing and turns it into an exclusive. Now Adium must decide whether to resign as the chairwoman and go with Aarch. Aarch must likewise decide whether or not to remain head coach of the Snow Kids. Sonny and Magnus return Brim Simbra to the flux society, and his spirit joins the flux council where it will be available for ever to assist. Magnus reveals that Team Paradisia is a group of cyborgs that contain the multi-flux, shocking the council and giving them something new to worry about.
75	23	"Lost Illusions"	24 October 2011	323
Aarch resigns as the coach of The Snow Kids so he can spend his time with Adium. Rocket moves from being a player to being the new coach of the Snow Kids. Maya and Tia's father, the ambassador, go and visit Sinedd's parents. They reveal he is alive and that the people who stole their identities are in prison. The second semifinal takes place between Team Paradisia and the Elektras. The Elektras use the wave to get an early 1:0 lead, but Paradisia's speed proves to be too much in the second half. After a 1:1 Halftime draw the twin cyborgs, Nikki 4 and Nina 8, each score in the second half and set up a championship match between Team Paradisia and The Snow Kids. In an effort to strengthen their team and their chances of winning, Rocket visits Sineed and asks him to rejoin the Snow Kids. After meeting with Rocket, Sinedd is thinking about the offer when Maya approaches him and asks him to listen to her. Meanwhile Lord Phoenix contacts Vega to make an arrangement, meet with him and make him rich or else he will expose all of Team Paradisia's secrets. The real intent is to draw Harris out and stop his ambitious plan permanently.
76	24	"The Second Chance"	25 October 2011	324
Maya informs Sinedd his parents are still alive and that he has a little sister. She gets him to agree to meet with them. Magnus shows up to meet Harris thinking Harris will be there with a hologram. What Harris doesn't expect is for Magnus to also be a hologram. The pirates destroy Harris's robots and then capture his robot cat. Clamp collects flux from some of the stars of each team to try and finalize his anti-multi-flux formula. One thing seems to be missing until the robots accidentally spill Mice delight into the flux's. Sinedd rejoins the Snow Kids, but he has to work hard to try and remaster the Breath instead of relying on the Smog. Aarch leaves the stadium to return to Akillian and help Norata with the rare Archilian flower that has recently restarted blooming. With Clamp's help, Harris hacks into the robot cats memory and learns that a multi-flux bomb is on Akillian. Clamp contacts Aarch, and the search for the bomb begins.
77	25	"On all Fronts"	26 October 2011	325
The Pirates release the cat so they can track him back to Harris. Aarch and Norata trace the bomb on Achillian to Arcadia, more specifically to Aarch's academy. Warren sits with the kids of Club Galactik in the stands and admits he won't mind if the Snow Kids win the championship. Also in the stands watching her first game is Sinedd's sister. Sineed and Rocket watch from the locker room, but an uneasy feeling that Sinedd can't shake constantly presents itself. The match between the Snow Kids and Team Paradisia begins with a tied ball between D'Jok and Nikki 4 forcing a second faceoff between Mark and Nina 8. Despite Nina catching him by surprise, Mark uses the breath to rally and gain the faceoff. Both teams go back and forth shooting like crazy, but neither team is able to score. Ahito falls asleep during a Paradisia fast break and isn't able to recover fast enough to stop Nina from scoring and giving Paradisia a 1:0 lead. Aarch and Norata find the multi-flux bomb in the basement of his academy, but before they can do anything one of Harris's robots attacks them and knocks Norata unconscious.
78	26	"The Stars of Akillian are Eternal"	27 October 2011	326
Halftime arrives with Paradisia up 1:0. Clamp manages to find out what the strange element is in Mice delight and uses it to finalize the anti-multi-flux. It's too late to use it on Achillian though. Rocket subs in Sinedd for Mark as Mark has exhausted his energy. Norata and Aarch manage to take out the multi-flux bomb, but Harris decides to set it off. Despite them kicking the bomb off the planet, Achillian suffers the same fate as the Shadows planet and temporarily loses its flux. The Snow Kids begin to struggle until the true power of Ahito is revealed. Ahito manages to summon all the flux Achillian lost and super charges all the Snow Kids. With the new energy the Snow Kids counter. D'Jok is able to tie the score up with a long range kick. Rocket comes in for an exhausted Thran. Sinedd drives in to attack Paradisia's goal and gets fouled, giving the Snow kids a free kick. In space the Pirates attack Harris's base with the goal of eliminating the multi-flux. If they can take out the multi-flux on the ship, Team Paradisia will lose its multi-flux. Lord Phoenix changes his name back to Magnus Blade and teams up with Sonny to infiltrate the ship. When Sonny gets cornered and appear to have lost. While this is occurring, Rocket fakes the kick and passes it to D'Jok, who passes it to Sinedd. Sinedd scores and the Snow Kids win the cup 2:1. Despite the loss, Harris orders Team Paradisia to jump up and touch the cup first. The Snow Kids robots bust in with the anti-multi-flux and the Pirates reinforcements. They eliminate Harris's cat while Magnus and Sonny corner Harris and Vega. A hole is knocked in the hull, and Harris and Vega are knocked out into space. The robots use the anti-multi-flux on the main multi-flux, and the cup is protected. The Snow Kids are declared to be the greatest champions ever as they've become the first team to win the cup 3 times in a row. A few months later Aarch and Artegor agree to become coaches for the next generation, the kids training at Club Galactik. It is revealed that Aarch and Adium are now married, and Adium is pregnant. Mice Delight has been declared to be a technoid drink not intended for organic consumption, and it has become a great success. As Clamp takes the Snow Kids and the Galactik Kids into the new holo-trainer, a mysterious light surrounds it and causes them all to scream. Clamp deactivates the holo-trainer, but all the Galactik kids, Mei, and Micro-Ice have disappeared. A strange energy with their screams is shown taken into space, leaving a major cliff hanger for the series finale.
