= Clarks Hill, South Carolina =

- CDP
- Location in McCormick County and the state of South Carolina.
- Coordinates: 33°39′29″N 82°09′58″W
- Country: United States
- State: South Carolina
- County: McCormick

Area
  - Total: 3.20 sq mi (8.28 km^{2})
  - Land: 3.20 sq mi (8.28 km^{2})
  - Water: 0 sq mi (0.00 km^{2})
- Elevation: 358 ft (109 m)

Population (2020)
  - Total: 289
  - Density: 90.4/sq mi (34.92/km^{2})
- Time zone: UTC-5 (Eastern (EST))
  - Summer (DST): UTC-4 (EDT)
- ZIP code: 29821
- Area codes: 864, 821
- FIPS code: 45-14590
- GNIS feature ID: 2402780

Clarks Hill is a census-designated place (CDP) in McCormick County, South Carolina, United States. The population was 376 at the 2000 census.

== History ==
The community was named after an 18th-century local blacksmith.

The Hopewell Rosenwald School was listed on the National Register of Historic Places in 2010.

== Geography ==
Clarks Hill is located at 33°39′39″N 82°9′37″W (33.660876, -82.160302).

According to the United States Census Bureau, the CDP has a total area of 3.2 square miles (8.3 km^{2}), all land.

The soils of Clarks Hill are moderately well drained or well drained. They have brown sandy loam topsoils which are underlain by red clay. This fine-textured material may form a distinct layer or comprise the entire subsoil. They support forests in which loblolly pine and shortleaf pine dominate.

=== Climate ===
Clarks Hill has a humid subtropical climate (Köppen Cfa) with long, hot summers and short, mild winters.

Climate data for Clarks Hill (1991–2020 normals, extremes 1952–2022)
Month	Jan	Feb	Mar	Apr	May	Jun	Jul	Aug	Sep	Oct	Nov	Dec	Year
Record high °F (°C)	83 (28)	84 (29)	91 (33)	94 (34)	98 (37)	104 (40)	109 (43)	108 (42)	103 (39)	98 (37)	91 (33)	81 (27)	109 (43)
Mean maximum °F (°C)	72.9 (22.7)	76.9 (24.9)	83.8 (28.8)	88.7 (31.5)	93.4 (34.1)	97.9 (36.6)	100.0 (37.8)	99.3 (37.4)	95.7 (35.4)	88.4 (31.3)	81.0 (27.2)	74.3 (23.5)	101.0 (38.3)
Mean daily maximum °F (°C)	55.4 (13.0)	59.1 (15.1)	66.9 (19.4)	75.5 (24.2)	82.5 (28.1)	89.0 (31.7)	92.2 (33.4)	90.6 (32.6)	85.5 (29.7)	76.0 (24.4)	65.7 (18.7)	57.9 (14.4)	74.7 (23.7)
Daily mean °F (°C)	45.7 (7.6)	48.5 (9.2)	55.5 (13.1)	63.5 (17.5)	71.3 (21.8)	78.4 (25.8)	82.0 (27.8)	80.6 (27.0)	75.2 (24.0)	65.3 (18.5)	54.6 (12.6)	48.0 (8.9)	64.1 (17.8)
Mean daily minimum °F (°C)	35.9 (2.2)	38.0 (3.3)	44.1 (6.7)	51.4 (10.8)	60.1 (15.6)	67.8 (19.9)	71.7 (22.1)	70.6 (21.4)	65.0 (18.3)	54.5 (12.5)	43.6 (6.4)	38.2 (3.4)	53.4 (11.9)
Mean minimum °F (°C)	18.2 (−7.7)	21.7 (−5.7)	26.1 (−3.3)	34.4 (1.3)	44.0 (6.7)	55.6 (13.1)	61.9 (16.6)	60.7 (15.9)	50.3 (10.2)	35.8 (2.1)	27.7 (−2.4)	22.8 (−5.1)	16.5 (−8.6)
Record low °F (°C)	−2 (−19)	5 (−15)	12 (−11)	23 (−5)	32 (0)	45 (7)	53 (12)	49 (9)	35 (2)	25 (−4)	17 (−8)	5 (−15)	−2 (−19)
Average precipitation inches (mm)	4.03 (102)	3.91 (99)	4.32 (110)	3.08 (78)	3.43 (87)	4.72 (120)	4.74 (120)	4.46 (113)	3.67 (93)	3.04 (77)	3.30 (84)	4.21 (107)	46.91 (1,190)
Source: NOAA

== Demographics ==
Historical population
Census	Pop.	Note	%±
2000	376		—
2010	381		1.3%
2020	289		−24.1%
U.S. Decennial Census

=== 2020 census ===
Clarks Hill CDP, South Carolina – Racial and ethnic composition Note: the US Census treats Hispanic/Latino as an ethnic category. This table excludes Latinos from the racial categories and assigns them to a separate category. Hispanics/Latinos may be of any race.
Race / Ethnicity (NH = Non-Hispanic)	Pop 2000	Pop 2010	Pop 2020	% 2000	% 2010	% 2020
White alone (NH)	54	70	59	14.36%	18.37%	20.42%
Black or African American alone (NH)	321	299	222	85.37%	78.48%	76.82%
Native American or Alaska Native alone (NH)	0	0	0	0.00%	0.00%	0.00%
Asian alone (NH)	0	0	0	0.00%	0.00%	0.00%
Native Hawaiian or Pacific Islander alone (NH)	0	0	0	0.00%	0.00%	0.00%
Other race alone (NH)	0	0	2	0.00%	0.00%	0.69%
Mixed race or Multiracial (NH)	0	12	3	0.00%	3.15%	1.04%
Hispanic or Latino (any race)	1	0	3	0.27%	0.00%	1.04%
Total	376	381	289	100.00%	100.00%	100.00%

=== 2000 census ===
As of the census of 2000, there were 376 people, 133 households, and 104 families living in the CDP. The population density was 117.5 inhabitants per square mile (45.4/km^{2}). There were 145 housing units at an average density of 45.3 per square mile (17.5/km^{2}). The racial makeup of the CDP was 14.36% White and 85.64% African American. Hispanic or Latino of any race were 0.27% of the population.

There were 133 households, out of which 35.3% had children under the age of 18 living with them, 43.6% were married couples living together, 29.3% had a female householder with no husband present, and 21.8% were non-families. 18.0% of all households were made up of individuals, and 6.0% had someone living alone who was 65 years of age or older. The average household size was 2.83 and the average family size was 3.20.

In the CDP, the population was spread out, with 28.5% under the age of 18, 9.0% from 18 to 24, 30.9% from 25 to 44, 21.5% from 45 to 64, and 10.1% who were 65 years of age or older. The median age was 34 years. For every 100 females, there were 76.5 males. For every 100 females age 18 and over, there were 83.0 males.

The median income for a household in the CDP was $28,269, and the median income for a family was $29,464. Males had a median income of $26,731 versus $22,411 for females. The per capita income for the CDP was $10,305. About 21.1% of families and 16.3% of the population were below the poverty line, including 12.5% of those under age 18 and 50.0% of those age 65 or over.
