= New Hope, Mercer County, West Virginia =

New Hope, West Virginia
- Unincorporated community
- Location within the state of West Virginia New Hope, West Virginia (the United States)
- Coordinates: 37°20′20″N 81°09′59″W
- Country: United States
- State: West Virginia
- County: Mercer
- Elevation: 2,461 ft (750 m)
- Time zone: UTC-5 (Eastern (EST))
  - Summer (DST): UTC-4 (EDT)
- Area codes: 304 & 681
- GNIS feature ID: 1555209

New Hope is an unincorporated community in Mercer County, West Virginia, United States. New Hope is located on West Virginia Route 20, 4 miles (6.4 km) west-southwest of Princeton.
