= Hopewell Rosenwald School =

- U.S. National Register of Historic Places
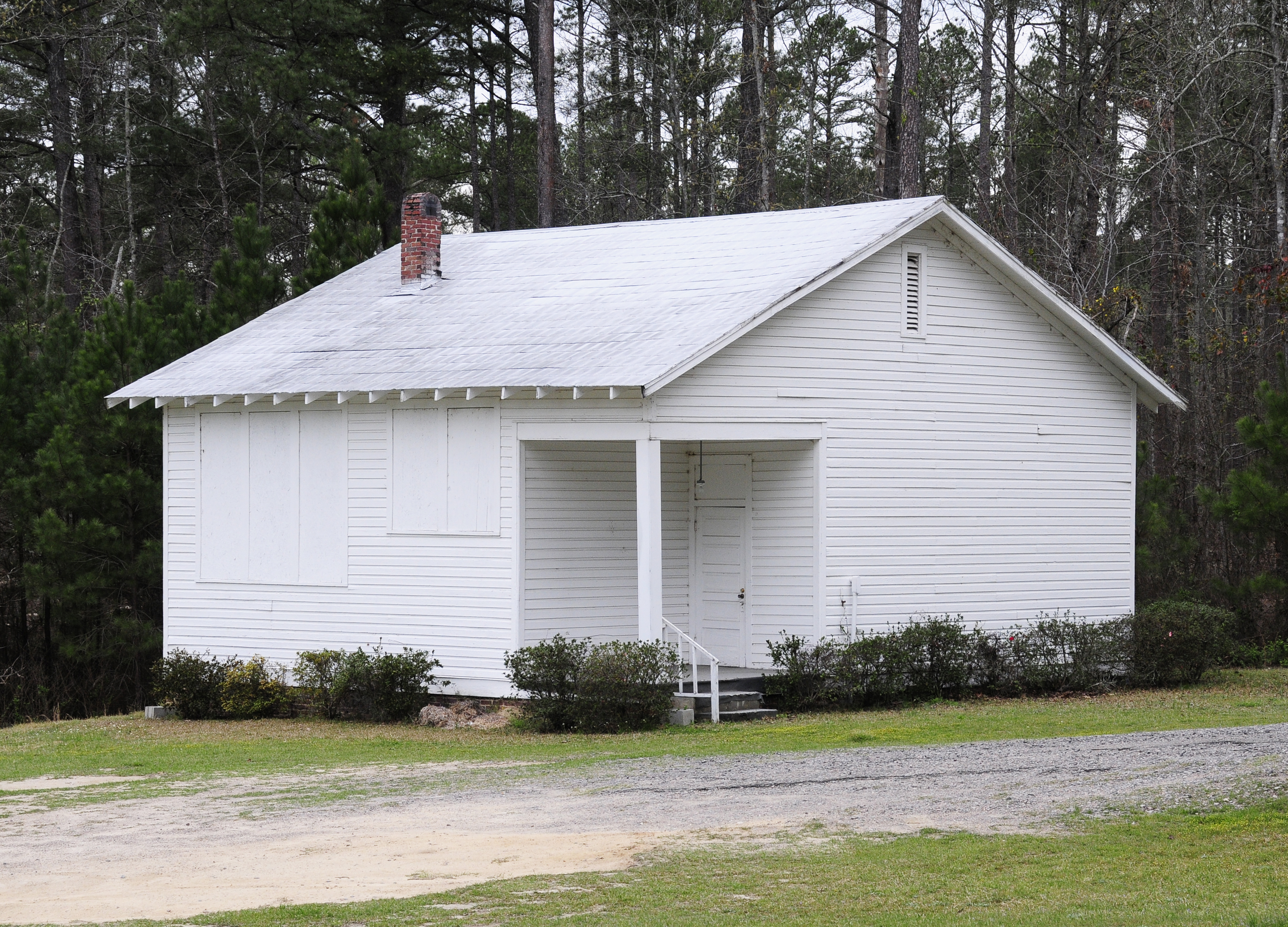
- Hopewell Rosenwald School, March 2012

- Location within South Carolina Location within the United States
- Location: Adjacent to 253 Hopewell Church Road (SC Sec RD 33-12), near Clarks Hill, South Carolina
- Coordinates: 33°36′35″N 82°07′28″W
- Area: less than one acre
- Built: 1926-1927
- Built by: Dressler, Fletcher B.; Smith, Samuel L.
- Architectural style: Bungalow/craftsman
- MPS: Rosenwald School Building Program in South Carolina, 1917-1932
- NRHP reference No.: 10000340
- Added to NRHP: June 9, 2010

Hopewell Rosenwald School is a historic Rosenwald school located near Clarks Hill in McCormick County, South Carolina. It was built in 1926–1927, and is a One Teacher Community Plan school consisting of two smaller rooms and one large room.

It was listed on the National Register of Historic Places in 2010.
