= Toad Suck, Arkansas =

- Unincorporated community
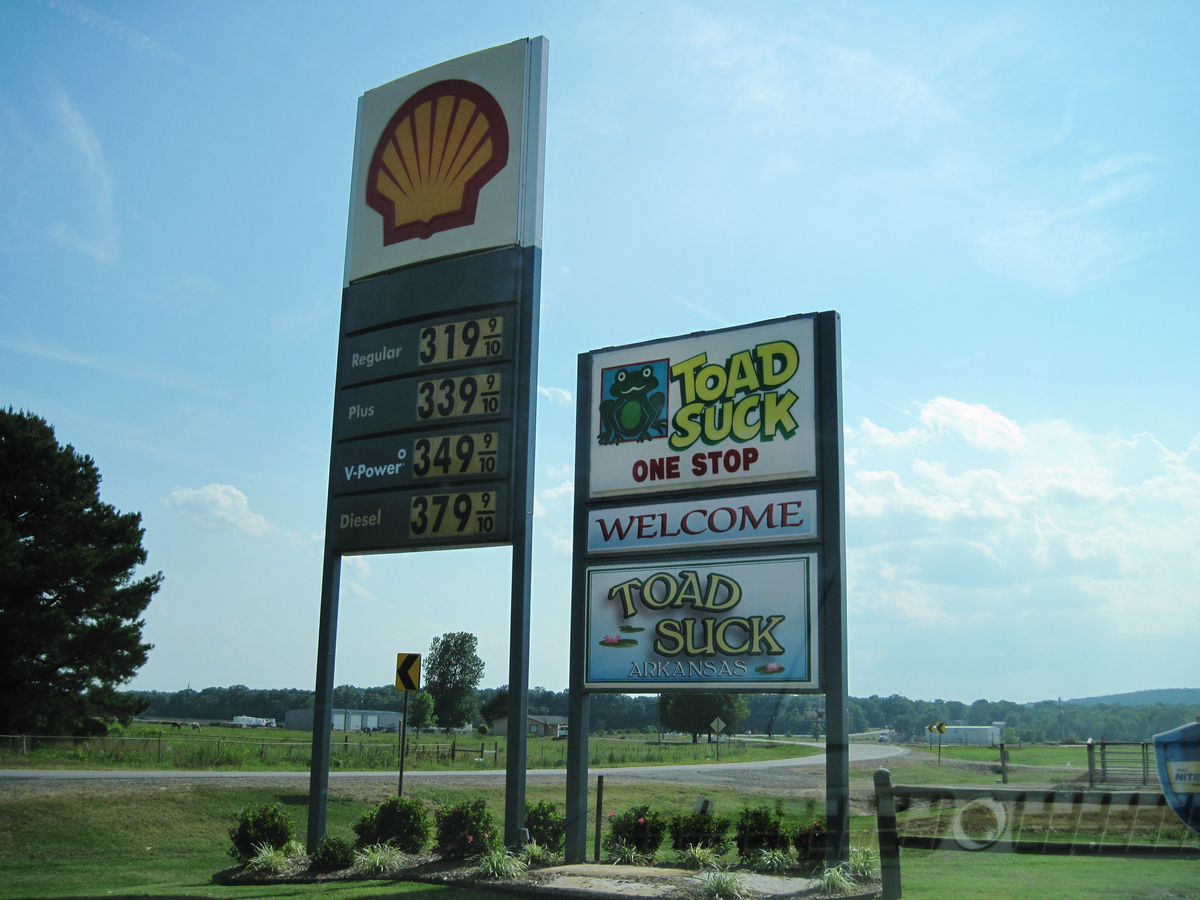
- Toad Suck One Stop

- Location within Arkansas Location within the United States
- Coordinates: 35°04′32″N 92°33′36″W
- Country: United States
- State: Arkansas
- County: Perry
- Elevation: 305 ft (93 m)
- Time zone: UTC-6 (Central (CST))
  - Summer (DST): UTC-5 (CDT)
- Area code: 501
- GNIS feature ID: 57209

Toad Suck is an unincorporated community in Perry County, Arkansas, United States. It is the location of (or is the nearest community to) Bigelow Rosenwald School, which is located at the junction of Arkansas Highway 60 and Bethel AME Road and is listed on the National Register of Historic Places.

The origin of the name Toad Suck is disputed. Some believe that it received the name when idle rivermen would congregate at the local tavern where they would "suck on the bottle 'til they swell up like toads", while others believe it is a corruption of a French phrase meaning "a narrow channel in the river." Toad Suck has frequently been noted on lists of unusual place names.

The community lent its name to the Toad Suck Ferry Lock and Dam on the Arkansas River. The dam is also a bridge bringing AR 60, locally named Prince Street, across the river. The Bigelow Rosenwald School is inland west of the river while Toad Suck Road is east of the river.

Toad Suck Daze is an annual fair that raises funds for scholarships. First organized in 1982, the festival is held annually in nearby downtown Conway during the first weekend in May. Originally held at Toad Suck Park near the Arkansas River Lock and Dam, the festival was moved to the downtown location in 1990 due to flooding at the river and has remained in the downtown area ever since.
