= New Hope, North Carolina =

New Hope, North Carolina may refer to:

- New Hope, Franklin County, North Carolina
- New Hope, Perquimans County, North Carolina
- New Hope, Surry County, North Carolina
- New Hope, Wayne County, North Carolina
