= The Kit Kats =

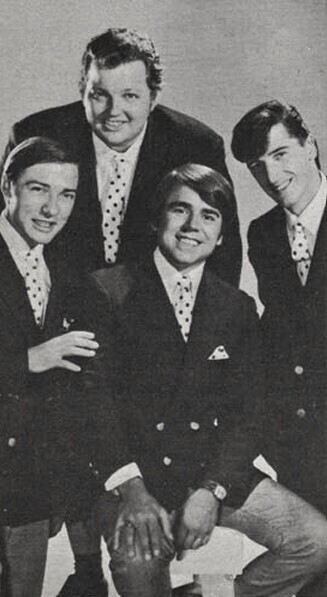
- The Kit Kats in 1966

Background information
- Also known as: The New Hope
- Origin: Philadelphia, Pennsylvania, U.S.
- Genres: Pop rock
- Years active: c. 1963–1974
- Past members: Kit Stewart; Karl Hausman; John Bradley; Ronnie Chichonski

The Kit Kats, later called The New Hope, was an American pop rock band from Philadelphia, Pennsylvania.

== History ==
The group was founded by drummer Kit Stewart and keyboardist Karl Hausman; they added lead singer John Bradley by 1963, when they began recording. They released material on the labels Virtue Records, Laurie Records, Lawn Records, and Jamie Records, and it was with Jamie and Ronnie Cichonski that they achieved their greatest commercial success. Two singles, "Let's Get Lost on a Country Road" and "Sea of Love", saw minor chart success in 1966-1967 and led to regional popularity, including as a live act.

In 1969, the band changed their name to The New Hope, and in 1970 released the single "Won't Find Better (Than Me)", which won them national attention and a Billboard Hot 100 chart placement. After recording with Jamie through 1970, they moved to Paramount in 1971 and released another single. By 1974, they had broken up. Kit Stewart died on July 2, 2001.

== Charting singles ==
- "Let's Get Lost on a Country Road" (1966) US No. 119
- "Sea of Love" (1967) US No. 130
- "Won't Find Better (Than Me)" (1970) US No. 57
