= Fredonia, Alabama =

- Census-designated place
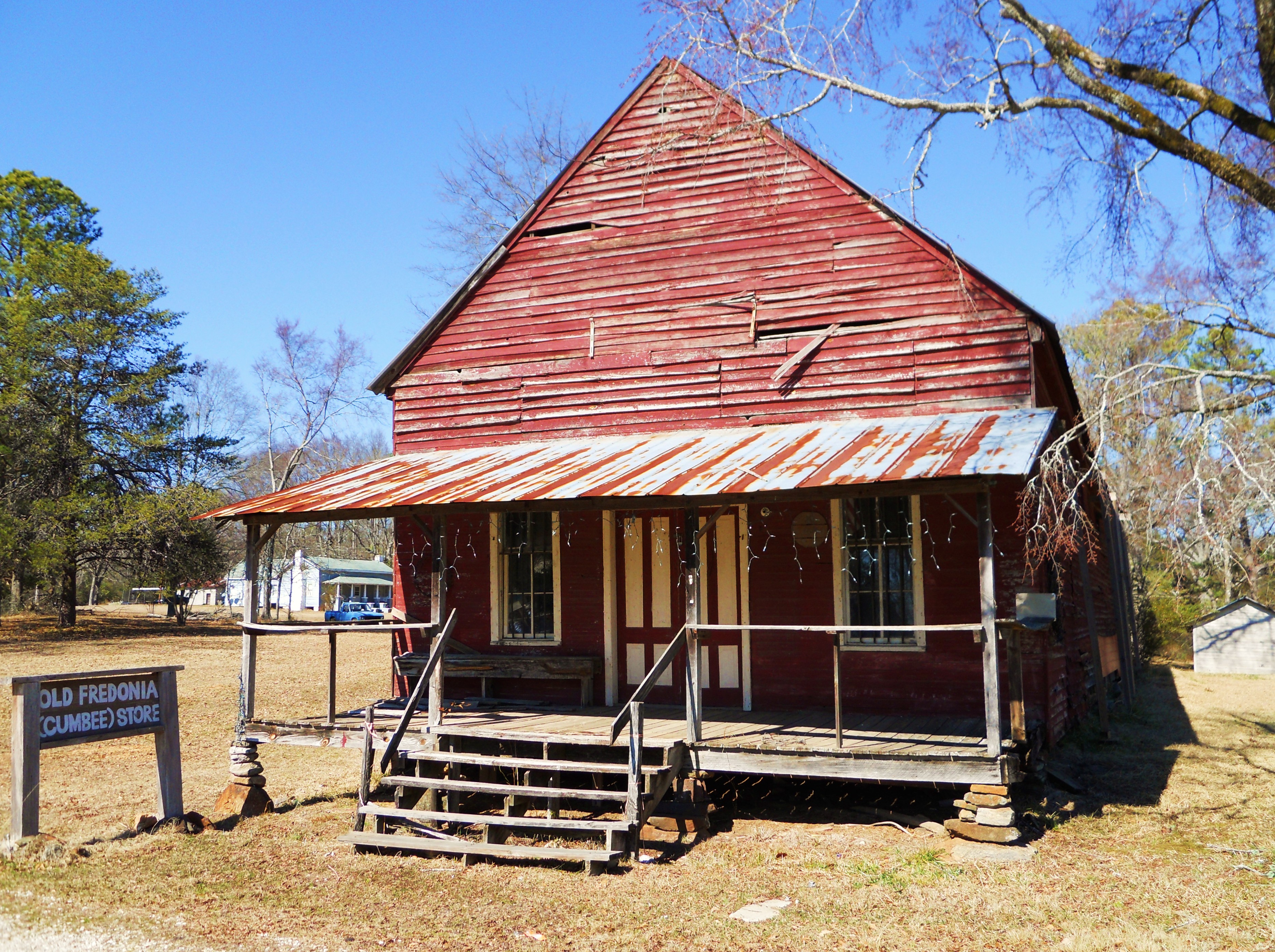
- The Old Fredonia (Cumbee) Store

- Location of Fredonia in Chambers County, Alabama.
- Coordinates: 32°59′35″N 85°17′19″W
- Country: United States
- State: Alabama
- County: Chambers

Area
  - Total: 12.00 sq mi (31.09 km^{2})
  - Land: 11.98 sq mi (31.03 km^{2})
  - Water: 0.027 sq mi (0.07 km^{2})
- Elevation: 771 ft (235 m)

Population (2020)
  - Total: 198
  - Density: 16.5/sq mi (6.38/km^{2})
- Time zone: UTC-6 (Central (CST))
  - Summer (DST): UTC-5 (CDT)
- Area code: 334
- GNIS feature ID: 2582675

Fredonia /friˈdoʊniə/ free-DOH-nia is an unincorporated community and census-designated place in Chambers County, Alabama, United States. As of the 2020 census, Fredonia had a population of 198. It is the location of the New Hope Rosenwald School, which is listed on the National Register of Historic Places.

== History ==
From its foundation, Fredonia was the educational and trade center for the northeast section of Chambers County. The town was incorporated September 29, 1853. Sixteen businesses existed including a jug factory, hotels, taverns, blacksmith shop, tan yard, the "Temperance House" as well as the first established Methodist Church in the county. The Southern Military was established in the village by the Alabama State Legislature, but it was forced to close by the Civil War.

=== Incorporation ===
In October 2008 the Chambers County Commission petitioned Probate Court to forfeit the charter of the Town of Fredonia. The Probate Court ordered that Fredonia's charter be forfeited. A majority of the people in the town decided that they wanted to reinstate the town and, in order to do so, would first have to reverse the forfeiture. A group called "Free Fredonia Community" was formed and fundraising begun, an attorney was hired and an appeal was filed to reverse the forfeiture. While waiting for the case to come before the court, an election happened, and a number of the new commissioners agreed that the forfeiture should be reversed. In July 2011 the Chambers County Commission voted to reverse the forfeiture. On July 26, 2011, the court returned Fredonia to the status it held before forfeiture.

== Demographics ==
Historical population
Census	Pop.	Note	%±
2010	199		—
2020	198		−0.5%
U.S. Decennial Census; 1850-1870 1870-1880; 1890-1910 1920 1930; 1940 1950 1960; 1970 1980 1990; 2000 2010

Fredonia was first listed as a census designated place in the 2010 U.S. census.

Fredonia CDP, Alabama – Racial and ethnic composition Note: the US Census treats Hispanic/Latino as an ethnic category. This table excludes Latinos from the racial categories and assigns them to a separate category. Hispanics/Latinos may be of any race.
Race / Ethnicity (NH = Non-Hispanic)	Pop 2010	Pop 2020	% 2010	% 2020
White alone (NH)	175	175	87.94%	88.38%
Black or African American alone (NH)	23	17	11.56%	8.59%
Native American or Alaska Native alone (NH)	0	2	0.00%	1.01%
Asian alone (NH)	0	0	0.00%	0.00%
Native Hawaiian or Pacific Islander alone (NH)	0	0	0.00%	0.00%
Other race alone (NH)	0	0	0.00%	0.00%
Mixed race or Multiracial (NH)	1	3	0.50%	1.52%
Hispanic or Latino (any race)	0	1	0.00%	0.51%
Total	199	198	100.00%	100.00%
