= New Hope Rosenwald School =

School near Fredonia Alabama, US (1915–1964)

- U.S. National Register of Historic Places
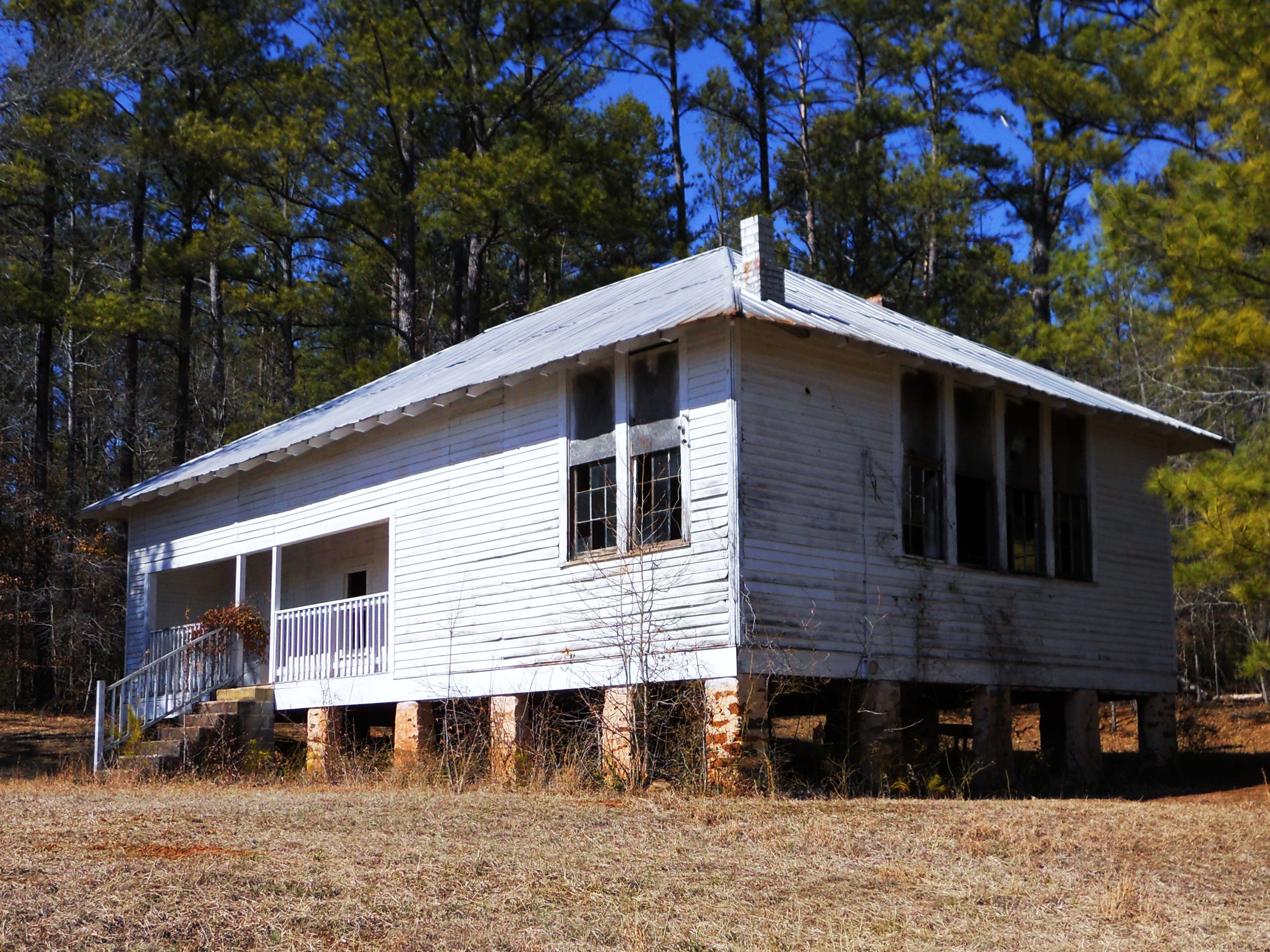
- New Hope Rosenwald School in 2011.

- Location within Alabama
- Nearest city: Fredonia, Alabama
- Coordinates: 32°56′37″N 85°17′08″W
- Built: 1915
- Architect: William Augustus Hazel
- MPS: The Rosenwald School Building Fund and Associated Buildings Multiple Property Submission
- NRHP reference No.: 01001297
- Added to NRHP: November 29, 2001

New Hope Rosenwald School (1915–1964) was a one teacher Rosenwald School for African American students, and is a historic building, located near Fredonia, Alabama, U.S. It was listed on the National Register of Historic Places as part of The Rosenwald School Building Fund and Associated Buildings Multiple Property Submission on November 29, 2001.

== History ==
The building was designed by William Augustus Hazel, following the guidelines found in The Rural Negro School Building and It's Relation to the Community (1913), published by Tuskegee Institute. The land for the school building was donated by J. A. Simmons and Sue Simmons, a wealthy white family. The Julius Rosenwald Fund provided US $400 to the total construction cost; the local African American community raised $400; and the local white community raised $400 towards the final cost of the school building. It was built in 1915, and was named New Hope School because of its location near New Hope Missionary Baptist Church.

The school closed in 1964, and the students were consolidated with the Five Points School in Five Points, Alabama.

From 1969 until 1978, the former school building was used a private residency for an elderly couple, and after in which it was abandoned.
