= New Hope Christian Schools =

Private school in Grants Pass, Oregon

Location
- 5961 New Hope Road; Grants Pass, Josephine County, Oregon 97527; United States
- Coordinates: 42.359412°N 123.366731°W

Information
- Type: Private
- Religious affiliation: Christian
- Opened: 1961
- Principal: Josh Walker
- Grades: Pre-K-12
- Enrollment: 217 (high school: 45)
- Campus type: Rural
- Colors: Red, White, and Black
- Athletics conference: OSAA Skyline League 1A-4
- Mascot: Warriors
- Team name: New Hope Christian Warriors
- Affiliations: ACSI, OFIS
- Website: newhopechristian.net

New Hope Christian Schools is a private Christian school founded in 1961 located in Grants Pass, Oregon, United States.

== Campus and academics ==
The majority of the school's high school curriculum comes from Bob Jones University Press and A Beka Book.
