= New Hope High School =

New Hope High School may refer to:

- New Hope High School (New Hope, Alabama), New Hope, Alabama
- New Hope High School (Mississippi), Columbus, Mississippi
- New Hope High School (New Hope, Virginia), a historic public school building
