= Hope Hull, Alabama =

- Unincorporated community
- Location within Alabama Location within the United States
- Coordinates: 32°16′12″N 86°21′26″W
- Country: United States
- State: Alabama
- County: Montgomery
- Elevation: 207 ft (63 m)
- Time zone: UTC-6 (Central (CST))
  - Summer (DST): UTC-5 (CDT)
- ZIP code: 36043
- Area code: 334
- GNIS feature ID: 120350

Hope Hull, originally known as McGehee's Switch, is a town in Montgomery County, Alabama, United States, about 9 miles (14 km) southwest of Montgomery. It is part of the Montgomery metropolitan area.

== History ==
Hope Hull, a stop on the Mobile and Montgomery Railroad, was originally known as McGehee's Switch in honor of the local planter Abner W. McGehee. McGehee later changed the name of the community to Hope Hull in honor of the Methodist circuit rider Hope Hull, whom he met while living in Georgia. The U.S. post office there operated under the name McGehee's from 1875 until it was renamed Hope Hull in 1877. According to the Montgomery City Directory of 1880, it had a Baptist church and a school, and received mail twice a week.

== Demographics ==
According to the U.S. Census Bureau, Hope Hull had an estimated population of 7,355 in 2024. The median age was 50 years. 21% of residents were under the age of 18, 58% were between the ages of 18 and 64, and 21% were 65 years of age or older. The population was made up of 54% females and 46% males.

There were 2,898 households in Hope Hull, of which had about 2.5 people living in them. Of all households, 53% were married-couple households, 10% were households with a male householder and no spouse or partner present, and 24% were households with a female householder and no spouse or partner present. About 13% of households were made up of non-family members. The median income for a household was $50,269, with 18% of residents making between $100K and $200K, and 6% of residents making over $200K. About 22.3% of the population was living below the poverty line, which was about 10 times higher than the overall rate in Montgomery County.

The racial makeup of Hope Hull was 32% White, 57% Black, 10% Hispanic, and 1% from two races.

== Climate ==
Hurricanes and tornadoes are common in Hope Hull. In 2025, Hope Hull received a weather risk score of 194 for hurricanes, which is almost twice the national average score. A weather risk score of 94 for tornadoes was received, which is almost equal to the national average score.

== Sights ==
Hope Hull is the location of Tankersley Rosenwald School, which is listed on the U.S. National Register of Historic Places. The school was built for underprivileged African American children in 1922 for the advancement of black education in the state.

The Alabama Safari Park is also located in Hope Hull. It is open most of the year with seasonal hours, and consists of 3 miles that feature zebras, giraffes, llamas, etc.

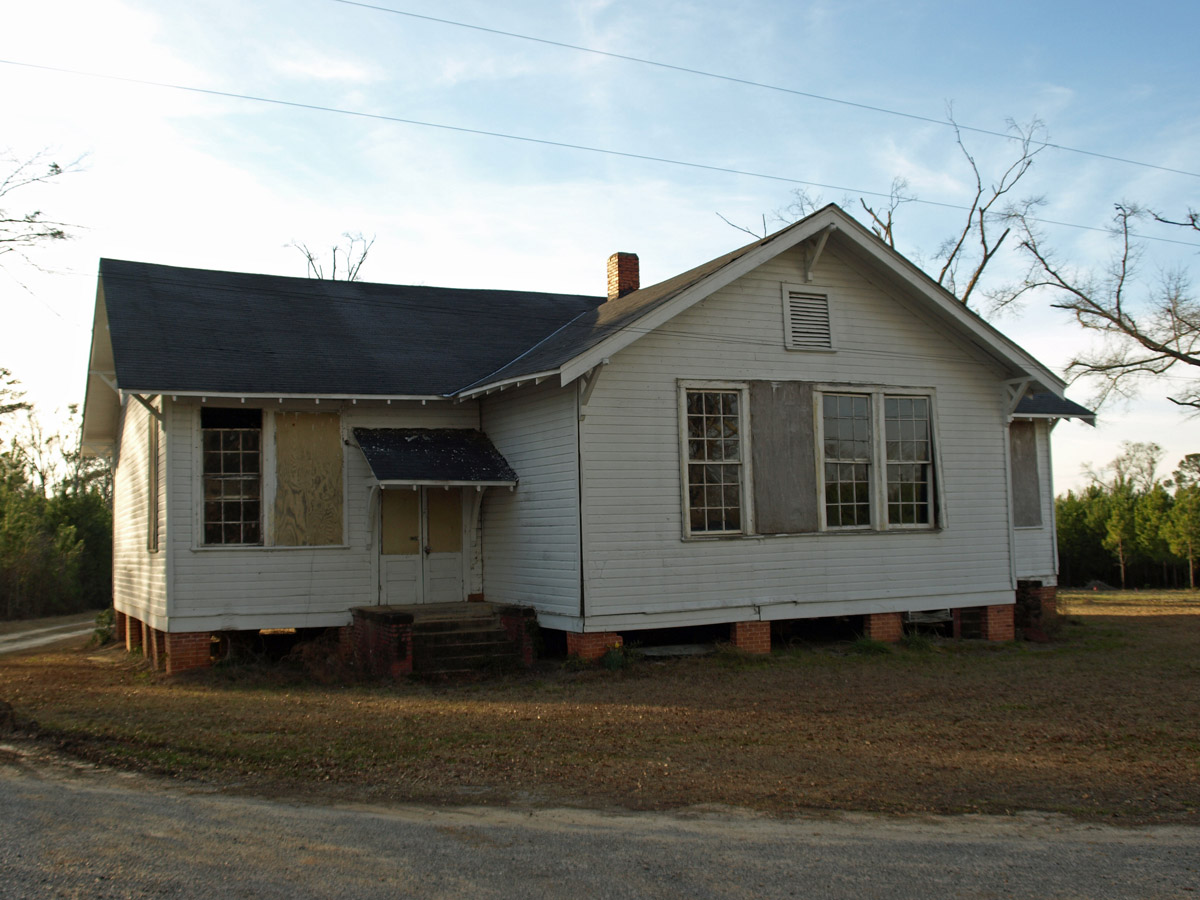
Tankersley Rosenwald School in 2009

== Economy ==
Hope Hull is the site of a large food packaging plant which employs about 300 people. In 2026, Diageo announced the construction of a new warehouse and distribution center in Hope Hull. Hope Hull is the proposed site of Project Red Clay, a closed-loop data center.

== Education ==
The Montgomery County Schools serving the Hope Hull area are Hooper Academy, Pintala Elementary School, and New Hope Academy. Hooper Academy is a private K-12 school, and New Hope Academy is a special education school located in the nearby town of Prattville.

== Notable people ==
- Bibb Graves, Governor of Alabama from 1927 to 1931 and 1935 to 1939.
- Ella Langley, country music singer-songwriter.
- Lou Thornton, former outfielder for the Toronto Blue Jays.
- Lucille Times, civil rights activist
