= Meriwether County School District =

School district in Georgia (U.S. state)

Address
- 2100 Gaston St. Greenville, Georgia, 30222-2847; United States
- Coordinates: 33.081323°N 84.646665°W

District information
- Grades: Pre-Kindergarten – 12
- Superintendent: Robert Griffin
- Accreditation(s): Southern Association of Colleges and Schools; Georgia Accrediting Commission

Students and staff
- Enrollment: 2,323 (2022–23)
- Faculty: 179.60 (FTE)
- Student–teacher ratio: 12.93

Other information
- Telephone: (706) 441-0601
- Website: mcssga.org

The Meriwether County School District is a public school district in Meriwether County, Georgia, United States, based in Greenville. It serves the communities of Gay, Greenville, Haralson, Lone Oak, Luthersville, Manchester, Pine Mountain, Warm Springs, and Woodbury.

== Schools ==
The Meriwether County School District has two elementary schools, two middle schools, and two high schools.

=== Elementary schools ===
- Mountain View Elementary School
- Unity Elementary School

=== Middle school ===
- Greenville Middle School
- Manchester Middle School

=== High school ===
- Greenville High School
- Manchester High School
