= Greenville Presbyterian Church =

Greenville Presbyterian Church may refer to:

- Greenville Presbyterian Church (New York), 1790, in Greenville, New York, United States
- Greenville Presbyterian Church (South Carolina), 1852, near Donalds, Greenwood County, South Carolina, United States
- Greenville Presbyterian Church and Cemetery, 1829, in Greenville, Georgia, United States
