= National Register of Historic Places listings in Meriwether County, Georgia =

Location of Meriwether County in Georgia

This is a list of properties and districts in Meriwether County, Georgia that are listed on the National Register of Historic Places (NRHP).

This National Park Service list is complete through NPS recent listings posted May 2, 2025.

== Current listings ==
	Name on the Register	Image	Date listed	Location	City or town	Description
1	Bulloch Family House	Bulloch Family House	January 11, 2002 (#01001429)	Spring St. 32°53′04″N 84°40′29″W	Warm Springs	Photo is wrong house.
2	Benjamin F. Bulloch House	Benjamin F. Bulloch House	May 26, 1994 (#94000524)	47 Bulloch St. 32°53′17″N 84°40′38″W	Warm Springs	Built in the Queen Anne style in 1893 by Warm Springs' co-founder, Benjamin F. Bulloch, the house was the location of "The Bulloch House Restaurant". The house was completely destroyed by a fire on June 10, 2015.
3	Carmel Rural Historic District	Carmel Rural Historic District	August 10, 1998 (#97000752)	E of GA 85. Roughly bounded by Winky Branch, Gable and Sullivan Mill Rds., Flint R., and White Oak Cr. 33°10′22″N 84°32′14″W	Alvaton	
4	Champinole	Champinole	October 22, 1992 (#92001400)	3920 GA Spur 109, 4 mi. NE of Greenville; 33°03′15″N 84°38′50″W	Greenville	
5	Clarkland Farms	Clarkland Farms	July 12, 1974 (#74000693)	La Grange Rd. 33°01′30″N 84°43′45″W	Greenville	
6	Eleanor Roosevelt School	Eleanor Roosevelt School	May 3, 2010 (#10000019)	Parham St. at Leverette Hill Rd. 32°53′56″N 84°41′07″W	Warm Springs	
7	Greenville Historic District	Greenville Historic District	March 16, 1990 (#90000433)	Bounded by Gresham, Gaston, Woodbury, Talbotton, Baldwin, Bottom, Martin, Terrell, LaGrange, and Newnan St. 33°01′34″N 84°42′51″W	Greenville	
8	Greenville Presbyterian Church and Cemetery	Greenville Presbyterian Church and Cemetery	February 5, 2002 (#01001555)	Greenville Rocky Mount Rd, off GA41/US27 Alt. 33°03′56″N 84°42′19″W	Greenville	
9	Harman-Watson-Matthews House	Harman-Watson-Matthews House	May 9, 1973 (#73000628)	SW of Greenville on Odessadale/Durand Rd. 32°59′21″N 84°49′36″W	Greenville	
10	Burwell O. Hill House	Burwell O. Hill House	June 17, 1982 (#82002453)	La Grange St. 33°01′33″N 84°43′23″W	Greenville	
11	Jones-Florence Plantation	Jones-Florence Plantation	March 29, 1984 (#84001163)	Off GA 109; 33°01′24″N 84°49′04″W	Odessadale	
12	Lone Oak Academy	Lone Oak Academy	January 28, 2002 (#01001536)	4945 Lone Oak Rd. 33°10′19″N 84°48′51″W	Lone Oak	Built c. 1870.
13	Manchester Community Building	Manchester Community Building	January 28, 2002 (#01001537)	105 E 2nd Ave. 32°51′07″N 84°36′54″W	Manchester	
14	Mark Hall		May 7, 1973 (#73000629)	SW of Greenville off GA 18; 32°57′27″N 84°45′00″W	Greenville	Built in 1855
15	Meriwether County Courthouse	Meriwether County Courthouse	May 7, 1973 (#73000630)	Court Sq. 33°01′42″N 84°42′45″W	Greenville	
16	Meriwether County Jail	Meriwether County Jail	May 7, 1973 (#73000631)	Reville St. and GA 27 A 33°01′46″N 84°42′42″W	Greenville	
17	Oakland	Oakland	June 28, 1982 (#82002455)	GA 41; 32°55′52″N 84°41′47″W	Warm Springs	Built in 1829. Also known as "Oakland Plantation Inn".
18	William D. Phillips Log Cabin		June 28, 1982 (#82002454)	GA 54; 33°09′38″N 84°51′40″W	Hogansville	The original structure has been destroyed.
19	Red Oak Creek Covered Bridge	Red Oak Creek Covered Bridge	May 7, 1973 (#73000632)	N of Woodbury on Huel Brown Rd. 33°02′18″N 84°33′12″W	Woodbury	
20	Render Family Homestead	Render Family Homestead	March 1, 1984 (#84001167)	GA 18; 33°00′56″N 84°42′34″W	Greenville	
21	Twin Oaks	Twin Oaks	August 26, 1980 (#80001117)	888 GA 100; 33°02′16″N 84°42′54″W	Greenville	
22	Warm Springs Historic District	Warm Springs Historic District	July 30, 1974 (#74000694)	S of GA 194 and W of GA 85W; 32°53′11″N 84°41′21″W	Warm Springs	US National Historic Landmark and a Georgia state historic site
23	White Oak Creek Covered Bridge	White Oak Creek Covered Bridge	June 19, 1973 (#73000627)	SE of Alvaton on Covered Bridge Rd. 33°09′00″N 84°33′02″W	Alvaton	Bridge was built c. 1880 and destroyed by flood waters in the 1990s. The metal pilings and skeleton of the deck are all that remain.

== Former listings ==
	Name on the Register	Image	Date listed	Date removed	Location	City or town	Description
1	Hiram Warner Hill House	Hiram Warner Hill House	April 7, 1983 (#83000236)	October 29, 2019	LaGrange St. 33°01′35″N 84°43′17″W	Greenville	
