= Greenville Historic District =

Historic district in Georgia, United States

- U.S. National Register of Historic Places
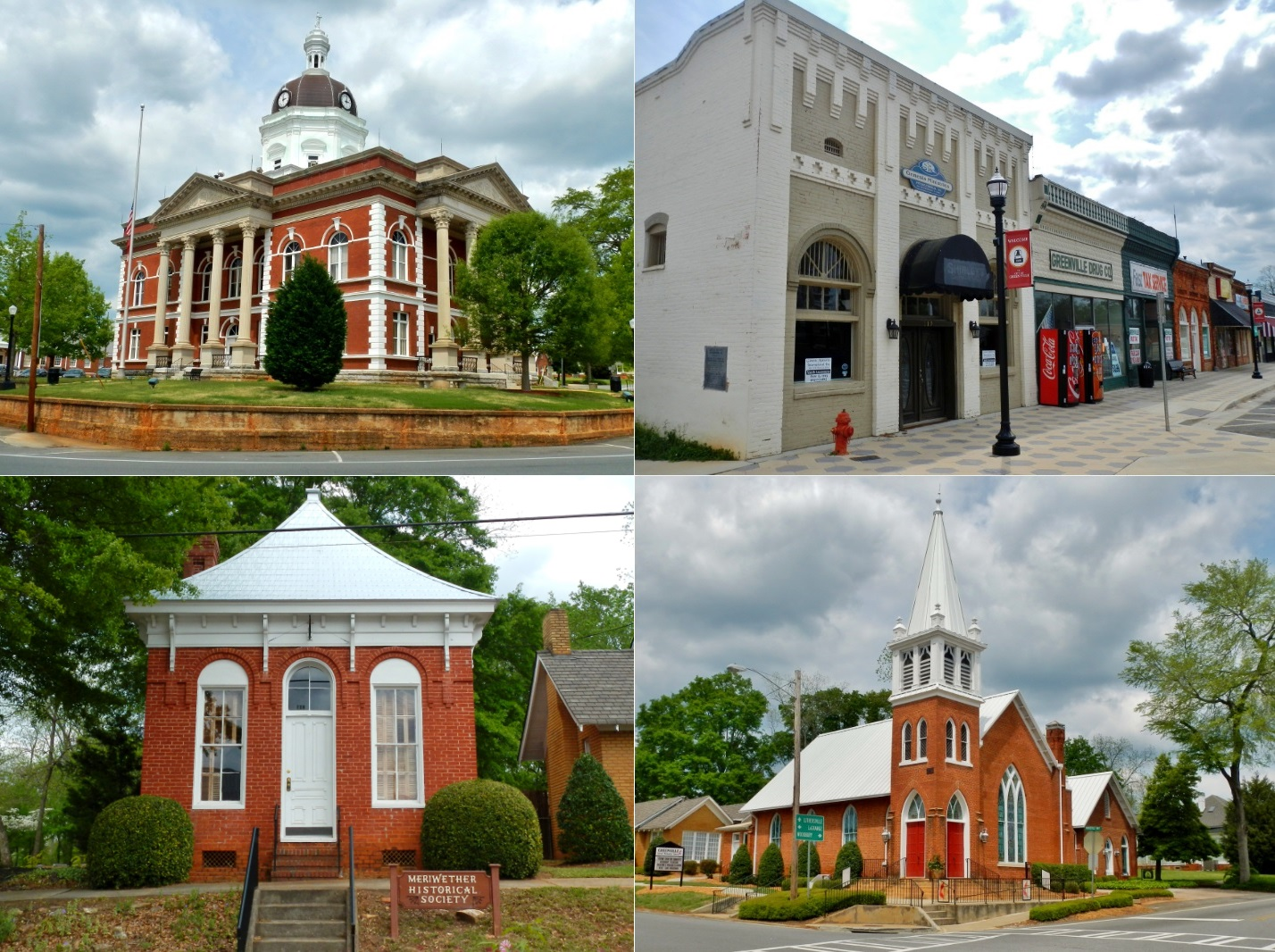

- Location within Georgia
- Location: Bounded by Gresham, Gaston, Woodbury, Talbotton, Baldwin, Bottom, Martin, Terrell, LaGrange, and Newnan St., Greenville, Georgia
- Coordinates: 33°01′34″N 84°42′51″W
- Area: 250 acres (100 ha)
- Built: 1828
- Built by: Multiple
- Architectural style: Mid 19th Century Revival, Late 19th and 20th Century Revivals, Late Victorian
- NRHP reference No.: 90000433
- Added to NRHP: March 16, 1990

Greenville Historic District in Greenville, Georgia is a 250 acres (1.0 km^{2}) historic district which was listed on the National Register of Historic Places in 1990. The listing included 209 contributing buildings and 103 non-contributing buildings, two contributing structures, and two contributing sites.

It includes the Burwell O. Hill House and the Meriwether County Courthouse, which are both listed separately on the National Register.

It is bounded by Gresham, Gaston, Woodbury, Talbotton, Baldwin, Bottom, Martin, Terrell, LaGrange, and Newnan St.
