= William D. Phillips Log Cabin =

Historic house in Georgia, United States

- U.S. National Register of Historic Places
- Location within Georgia
- Nearest city: Hogansville, Georgia
- Coordinates: 33°9′38″N 84°51′40″W
- Area: 3 acres (1.2 ha)
- Built: 1830
- NRHP reference No.: 82002454
- Added to NRHP: June 28, 1982

William D. Phillips Log Cabin is a historic site near Hogansville, Georgia, located in Meriwether County. It was built by William D. Phillips (1768-1849) for his family. The original log cabin is no longer standing. It was added to the National Register of Historic Places on June 28, 1982. It is located on Georgia State Route 54.

It was listed on the National Register as a rare log cabin of its era, which have not often survived in Georgia.

== See also ==
- National Register of Historic Places listings in Meriwether County, Georgia
