= Lone Oak, Georgia =

- Town
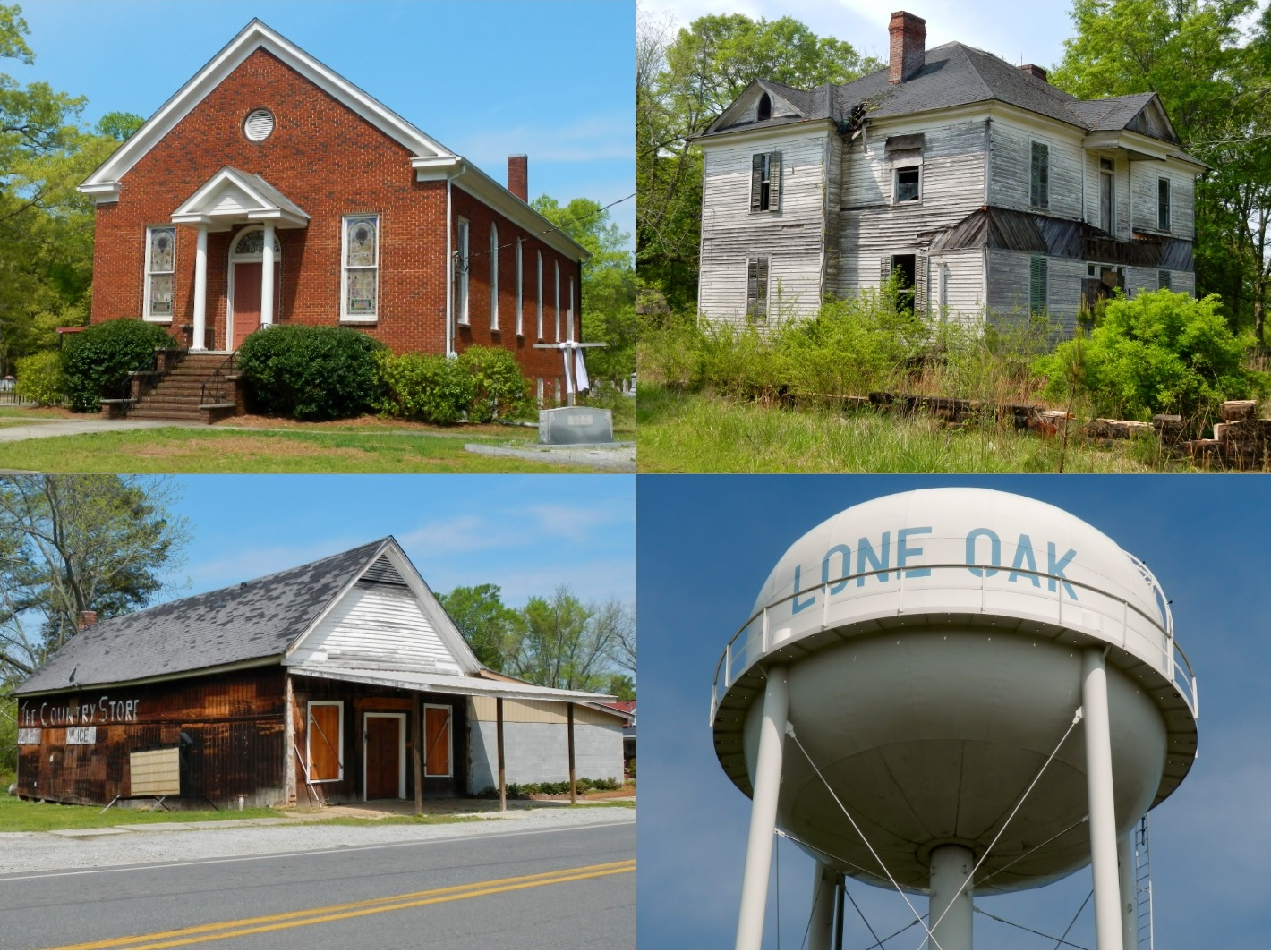
- Lone Oak in 2013

- Location in Meriwether County and the state of Georgia
- Coordinates: 33°10′19″N 84°49′12″W
- Country: United States
- State: Georgia
- County: Meriwether

Government
  - Type: Mayor-council government
  - Mayor: Scott Pittenger,
  - Councilmember: Scott Amerson
  - Councilmember: Morgan Lamb
  - Councilmember: Jordan Linch
  - Town Clerk: Armelle Robinson

Area
  - Total: 0.63 sq mi (1.62 km^{2})
  - Land: 0.63 sq mi (1.62 km^{2})
  - Water: 0 sq mi (0.00 km^{2})
- Elevation: 856 ft (261 m)

Population (2020)
  - Total: 114
  - Density: 182.4/sq mi (70.44/km^{2})
- Time zone: UTC-5 (Eastern (EST))
  - Summer (DST): UTC-4 (EDT)
- ZIP Codes: 30220; 30230
- FIPS code: 13-47252
- GNIS feature ID: 0317301
- Website: https://loneoakga.com/

Lone Oak is a town in Meriwether County, Georgia, United States. The population was 114 at the 2020 census.

== History ==
The Georgia General Assembly incorporated Lone Oak as a town in 1901. An updated charter was passed by the Georgia legislature in 2023. The town's name is descriptive of the original condition of the site.

== Geography ==
Lone Oak is located in northwest Meriwether County at 33°10′19″N 84°49′12″W (33.171862, −84.820113). Georgia State Route 54 passes through the town, leading northeast 5 miles (8 km) to Luthersville and west 6 miles (10 km) to Hogansville. Greenville, the Meriwether county seat, is 12 miles (19 km) to the southeast via Forrest Road.

According to the United States Census Bureau, the town has a total area of 0.6 square miles (1.6 km^{2}), all land.

== Demographics ==
Historical population
Census	Pop.	Note	%±
1910	247		—
1920	169		−31.6%
1930	149		−11.8%
1940	137		−8.1%
1950	120		−12.4%
1960	122		1.7%
1970	129		5.7%
1980	119		−7.8%
1990	161		35.3%
2000	104		−35.4%
2010	92		−11.5%
2020	114		23.9%
U.S. Decennial Census

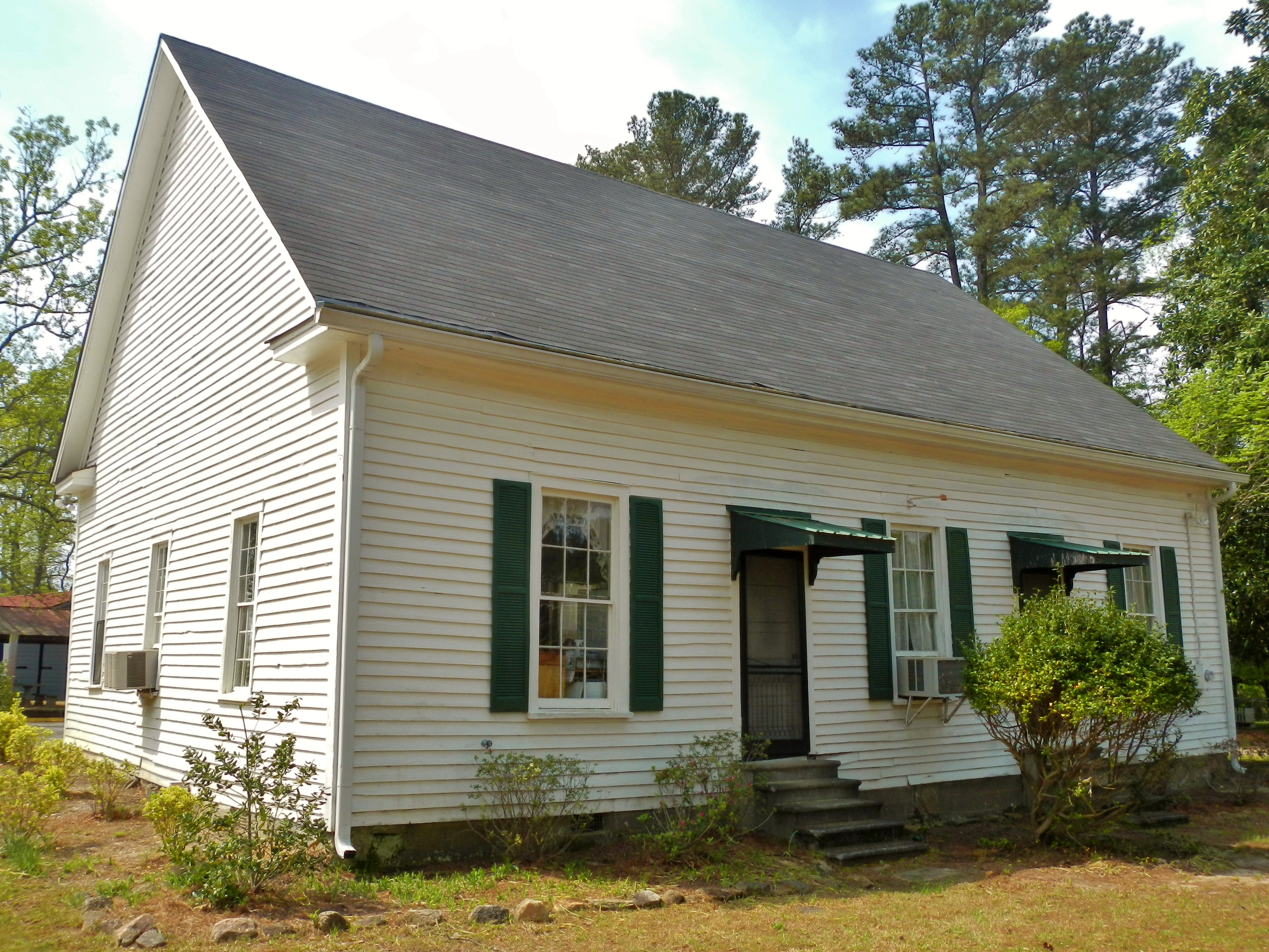
Lone Oak Academy was built in 1870 and added to the National Register of Historic Places in 2002.

As of the census of 2000, there were 104 people, 44 households, and 31 families residing in the town. In 2020, its population was 114.

In 2000, the median income for a household in the town was $36,250, and the median income for a family was $39,167. Males had a median income of $24,500 versus $28,000 for females. The per capita income for the town was $15,602. None of the population and none of the families were below the poverty line.

== Arts and culture ==
The town hosts the Lone Oak Arts & Crafts Festival each November.
