= Eleanor Roosevelt School =

- U.S. National Register of Historic Places
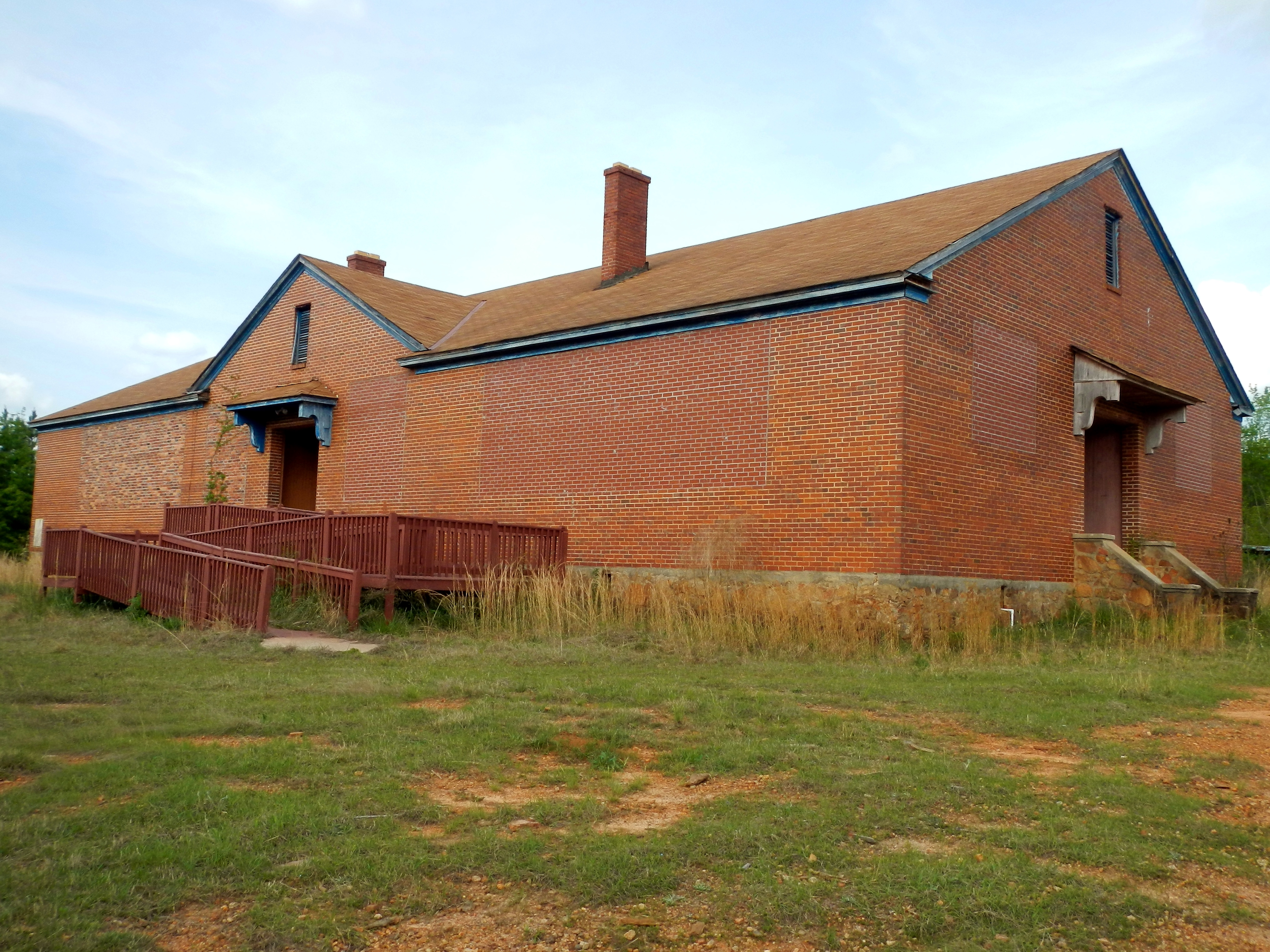

- Location within Georgia Location within the United States
- Location: 350 Parham Street, Warm Springs, Georgia, U.S.
- Coordinates: 32°53′56.32″N 84°41′6.61″W
- Area: 6 acres (2.4 ha)
- Built: 1936
- Architect: Fletcher B. Dresslar, Samuel L. Smith
- Architectural style: Colonial Revival
- NRHP reference No.: 10000019
- Added to NRHP: May 3, 2010

Eleanor Roosevelt School, also known as the Eleanor Roosevelt Vocational School for Colored Youth, Warm Springs Negro School, and the Eleanor Roosevelt Rosenwald School, which operated as a school from March 18, 1937 until 1972, was a historical Black community school located at 350 Parham Street at Leverette Hill Road in Warm Springs, Georgia. As of May 3, 2010, the school is listed on the National Register of Historic Places listings in Meriwether County, Georgia.

== History ==
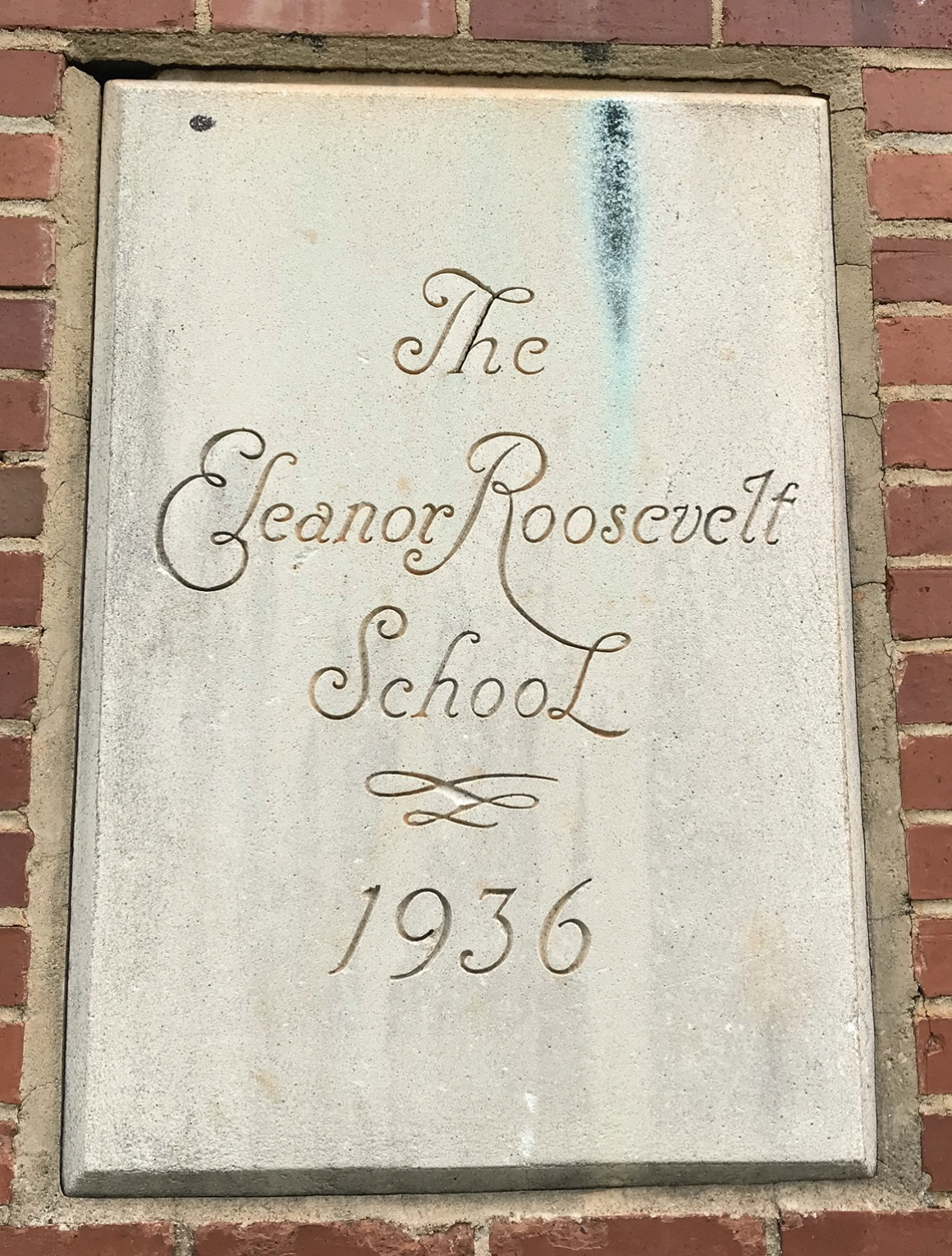
The Eleanor Roosevelt School plaque, 2020

The school was built in 1936, with funding from the Julius Rosenwald Fund by architects Samuel L. Smith and Fletcher B. Dresslar. It was the 5358th Rosenwald School created and the last one, in dedication to President Franklin Delano Roosevelt and his vision for education.

The Julius Rosenwald Fund had closed their school building program in 1932, but President Roosevelt personally insured the creation of this school alongside Samuel L. Smith. Between 1924 and 1945, President Roosevelt visited Georgia 41 times for seeking treatment for polio, and as a result he formed close ties to the state and the local politicians. In 1927, he had co-founded the Georgia Warm Springs Foundation (now known as the Roosevelt Warm Springs Rehabilitation Center within the Warm Springs Historic District).

On March 18, 1937 the school was opened and dedicated. The school was initially created as a five-teacher community school for rural Black students during a time of racial segregation. From 1937 until the mid-1960s, the school served grades 1st through grade 8th, then from the mid-1960s until 1972 served only elementary school students. In 1972, the school closed with racial integration, eventually becoming an adult education center (from 1972 until 1975) and a day care center (from 1975 until 1977). In 1977, the building was sold to a private owner.

The school was considered historic by the National Register of Historic Places because of the significance within African-American educational history, the school's connection to President Roosevelt, and because it is an architectural example of the Rosenwald School-style with the building plans published in, Community School Plans.

In 1940, the Eleanor Roosevelt School was honored with 2 of the 33 dioramas at the American Negro Exposition in Chicago.

== See also ==
- National Register of Historic Places listings in Meriwether County, Georgia
