= Warm Springs, Georgia =

- City
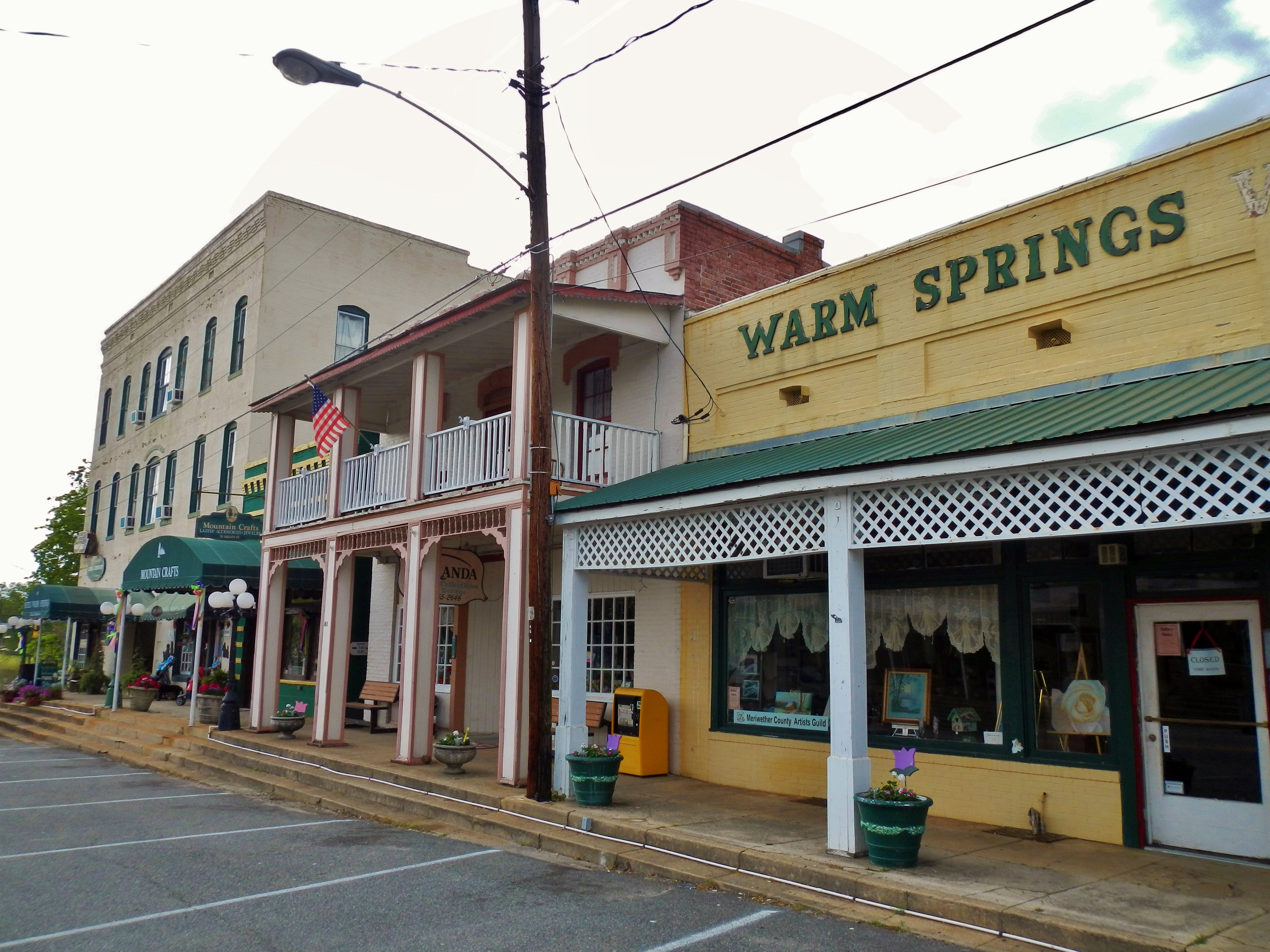
- Broad Street in Warm Springs

- Location in Meriwether County and the state of Georgia

- Location of Warm Springs in Georgia and in the US Warm Springs (the United States)
- Coordinates: 32°53′19″N 84°40′48″W
- Country: United States
- State: Georgia
- County: Meriwether

Area
  - Total: 1.54 sq mi (3.98 km^{2})
  - Land: 1.50 sq mi (3.89 km^{2})
  - Water: 0.035 sq mi (0.09 km^{2})
- Elevation: 930 ft (280 m)

Population (2020)
  - Total: 465
  - Density: 309.8/sq mi (119.62/km^{2})
- Time zone: UTC-5 (Eastern (EST))
  - Summer (DST): UTC-4 (EDT)
- ZIP code: 31830
- Area code: 706
- FIPS code: 13-80480
- GNIS feature ID: 0324851
- Website: warmspringsga.com

Warm Springs is a city in Meriwether County, Georgia, United States. The population was 465 at the 2020 census.

== History ==
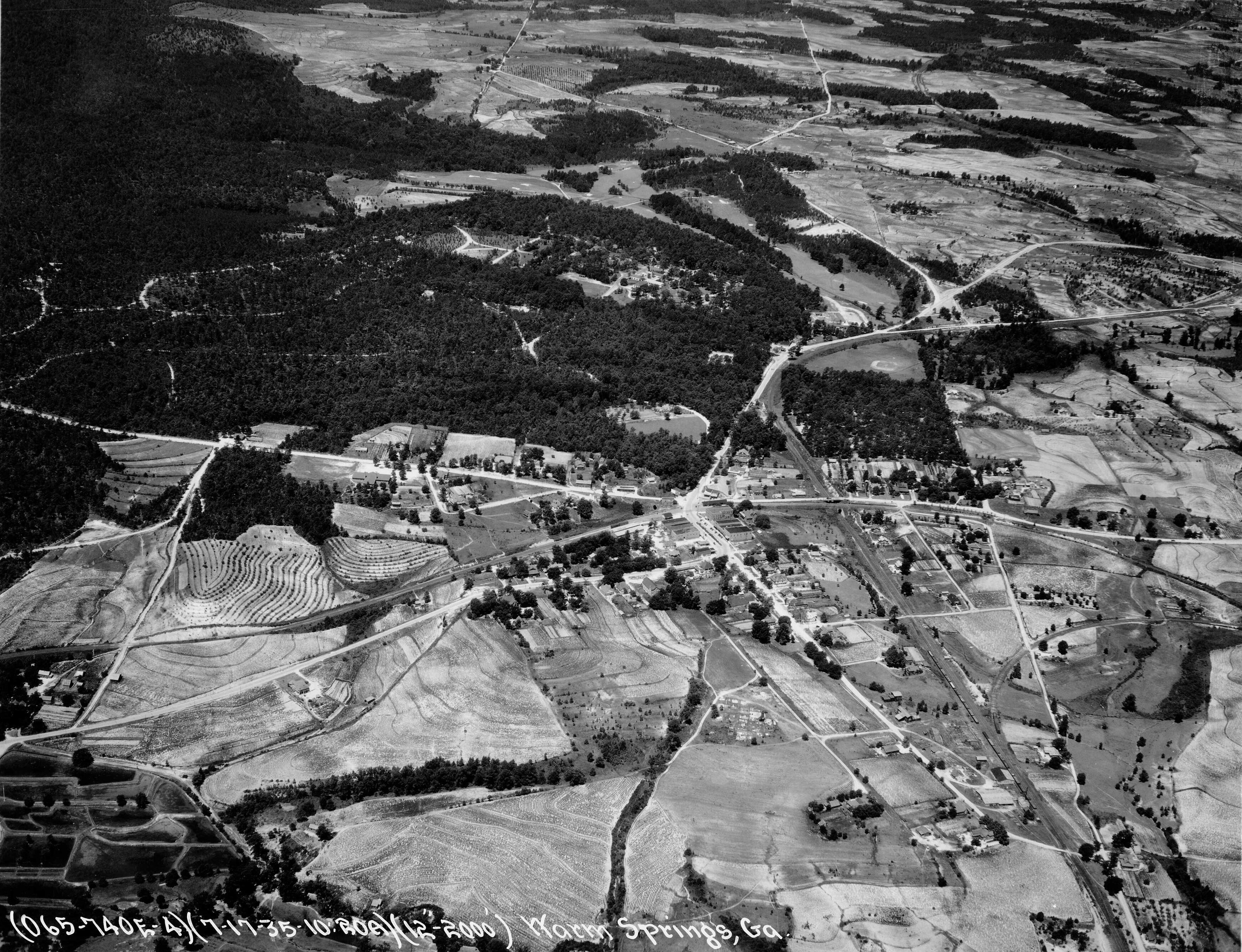
Warm Springs 1935

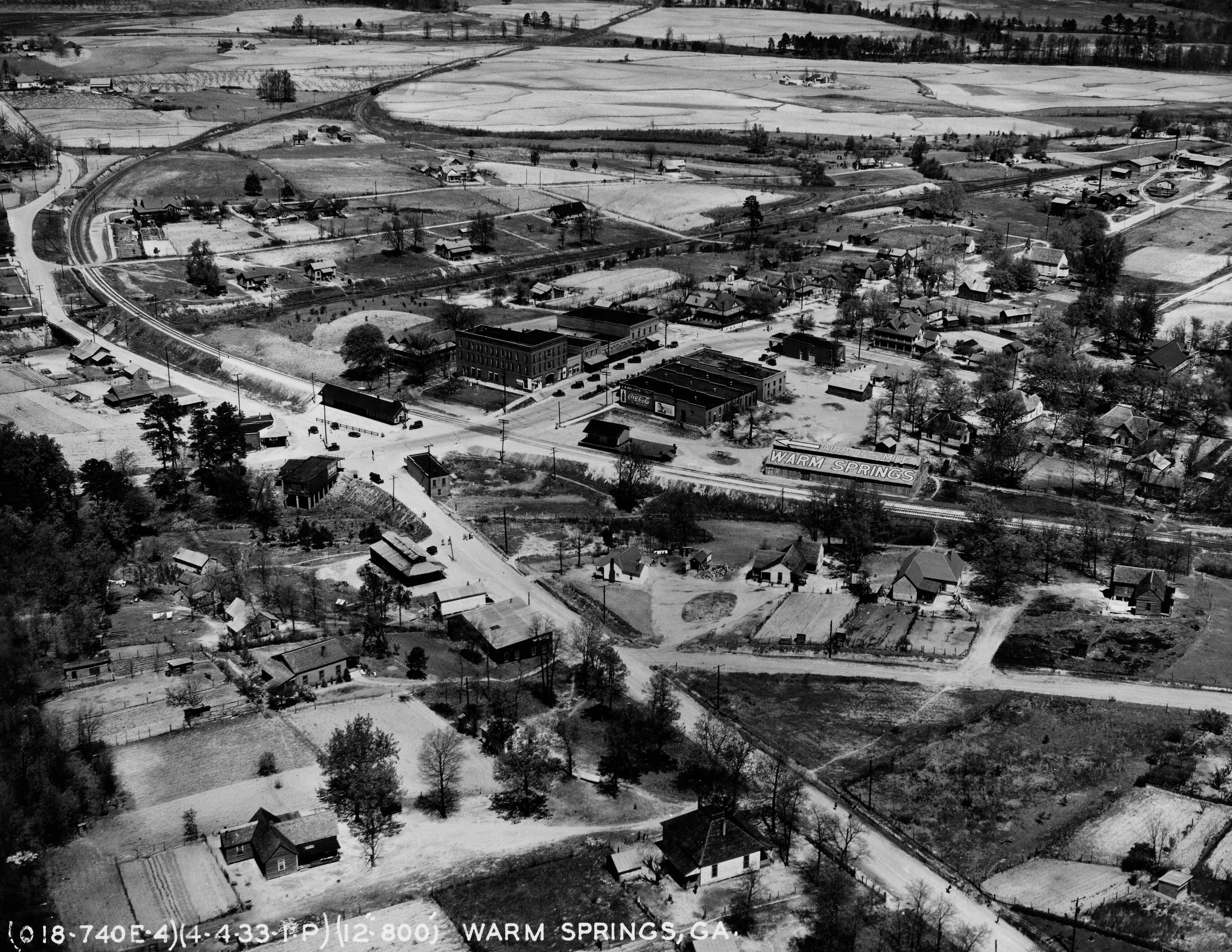
Warm Springs 1933

Warm Springs, originally named "Bullochville" (after the Bulloch family, which began after Stephen Bullock moved to Meriwether County in 1806 from Edgecombe County, North Carolina), first came to prominence in the 19th century as a spa town, because of its mineral springs which flow constantly at nearly 90 °F (32 °C). Residents of Georgia, particularly Savannah, began spending vacations at Bullochville in the late 18th century as a way to escape yellow fever, finding the number of warm springs in the vicinity of Bullochville very attractive. In the late 19th century traveling to the warm springs was a way to escape the city (in this case Atlanta) for a short while. Traveling by railroad to Durand, visitors would then go to Bullochville, 6 miles (10 km) away. One of the places benefiting from this was the Meriwether Inn. Once the automobile became popular in the early 20th century, tourists began going elsewhere, leading to the decline of the inn.

In 1921, future president Franklin Roosevelt contracted a paralytic illness, diagnosed at the time as poliomyelitis (later thought in a 2003 peer-reviewed retrospective study to be Guillain–Barré syndrome). He tried to regain strength in his legs by bathing and exercising in the warm water. His first time in Warm Springs was October 1924. He went to a resort in the town whose attraction was a permanent 88 °F (31 °C) natural spring. He was a constant visitor for two decades, and renamed the town from Bullochville to Warm Springs.

Roosevelt had a cottage built in 1932 that became famous as the Little White House, where he vacationed while president, because of his illness. He died there in 1945, and the home is now a public museum.

The town is still home to the Roosevelt Warm Springs Institute for Rehabilitation (Roosevelt's former polio hospital), which remains a world-renowned comprehensive rehabilitation center including a physical rehabilitation hospital and vocational rehabilitation unit. Economist Thomas M. Humphrey was one of the children treated for polio at the institute during the 1940s. The springs are not available for public use as a bath/spa resort, but they are used by the Roosevelt Institute for therapeutic purposes.

On October 27, 2020, former vice-president Joe Biden visited the town during his presidential campaign, delivering a speech advocating for racial reconciliation and voting rights.

== Geography ==
Warm Springs is located in southern Meriwether County at 32°53′19″N 84°40′48″W (32.888689, −84.680089). It is bordered to the south by Talbot County and to the west by F. D. Roosevelt State Park, including the Little White House. Pine Mountain rises to an elevation of 1,340 feet (410 m) south of the city, about 400 feet (120 m) higher than the city center.

U.S. Route 27 Alternate passes through the center of Warm Springs, leading north 10 miles (16 km) to Greenville, the Meriwether county seat, and southwest 39 miles (63 km) to Columbus. Georgia State Route 41 leads southeast 4 miles (6 km) to Manchester, the largest city in Meriwether County, while State Route 85 leads northeast 9 miles (14 km) to Woodbury.

According to the United States Census Bureau, Warm Springs has a total area of 1.5 square miles (3.9 km^{2}), of which 0.03 square miles (0.08 km^{2}), or 2.21%, are water. Warm Springs Branch and Cold Branch drain the area around the city center, both flowing north to Cane Creek, an east-flowing tributary of the Flint River. The southern, rural part of the city on Pine Mountain drains east to Pigeon Creek, another tributary of the Flint.

== Demographics ==
Historical population
Census	Pop.	Note	%±
1910	204		—
1920	332		62.7%
1930	400		20.5%
1940	608		52.0%
1950	557		−8.4%
1960	538		−3.4%
1970	523		−2.8%
1980	461		−11.9%
1990	407		−11.7%
2000	485		19.2%
2010	425		−12.4%
2020	465		9.4%
U.S. Decennial Census

As of the census of 2010, there were 485 people, 172 households, and 107 families residing in the city. The population density was 409.7 inhabitants per square mile (158.2/km^{2}). There were 208 housing units at an average density of 175.7 per square mile (67.8/km^{2}). The racial makeup of the city was 67.22% White, 31.75% African American, and 1.03% from two or more races.

There were 172 households, out of which 26.9% had children under the age of 18 living with them, 34.3% were married couples living together, 25.1% had a female householder with no husband present, and 36.6% were non-families. 34.3% of all households were made up of individuals, and 16.0% had someone living alone who was 65 years of age or older. The average household size was 2.33 and the average family size was 2.99.

In the city, the population was spread out, with 21.2% under the age of 18, 7.4% from 18 to 24, 22.1% from 25 to 44, 20.6% from 45 to 64, and 28.7% who were 65 years of age or older. The median age was 45 years. For every 100 females, there were 62.8 males. For every 100 females age 18 and over, there were 57.2 males.

The median income for a household in the city was $21,547, and the median income for a family was $29,950. Males had a median income of $24,422 versus $13,110 for females. The per capita income for the city was $14,872. About 14.7% of families and 16.4% of the population were below the poverty line, including 21.7% of those under age 18 and 9.3% of those age 65 or over.

== Notable people ==
- After graduating from John H. Francis Polytechnic High School, Cosmopolitan editor Helen Gurley Brown and her family moved to Warm Springs.
- George W. Jenkins, founder of Publix, was born in Warm Springs.
- Philanthropist George Foster Peabody retired in Warm Springs.
- Cpl. Maoma L. Ridings was from Warm Springs. She was a WAC stationed at Camp Atterbury, and was murdered August 28, 1943, in Room 729 of the Claypool Hotel in Downtown Indianapolis. Her murder was never solved, and made national news because she had once been a nurse to President Roosevelt on his visits to Warm Springs.
- US President Franklin Delano Roosevelt lived in the Little White House in Warm Springs while he was not in Washington or at his residence in Hyde Park, New York. He also died there.
- Football player Mykel Williams was born in Warm Springs.

== Gallery ==
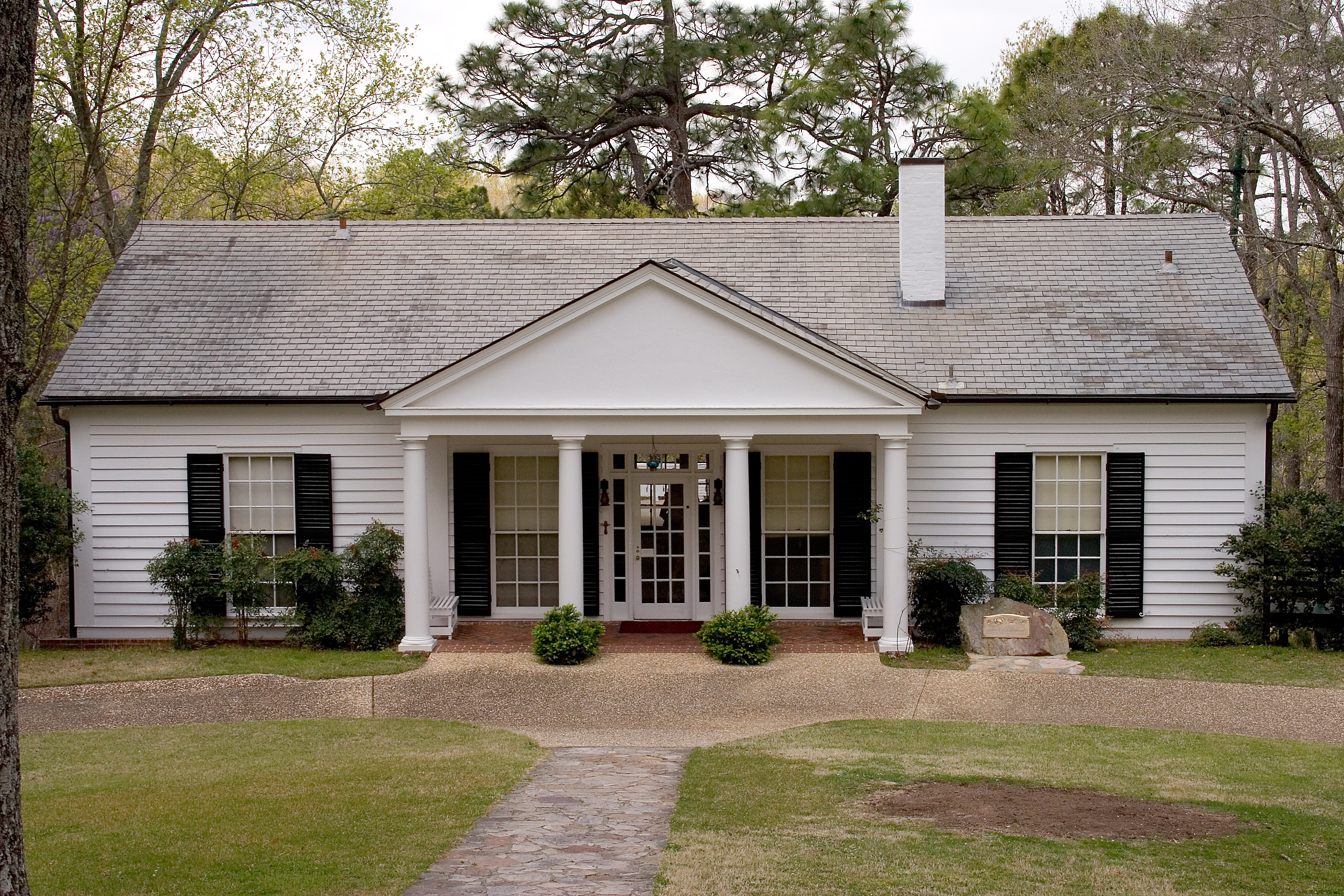
The Little White House, located in the Warm Springs Historic District, was Franklin Delano Roosevelt's personal retreat and was the site of his death. The house was opened to the public as a museum in 1948.

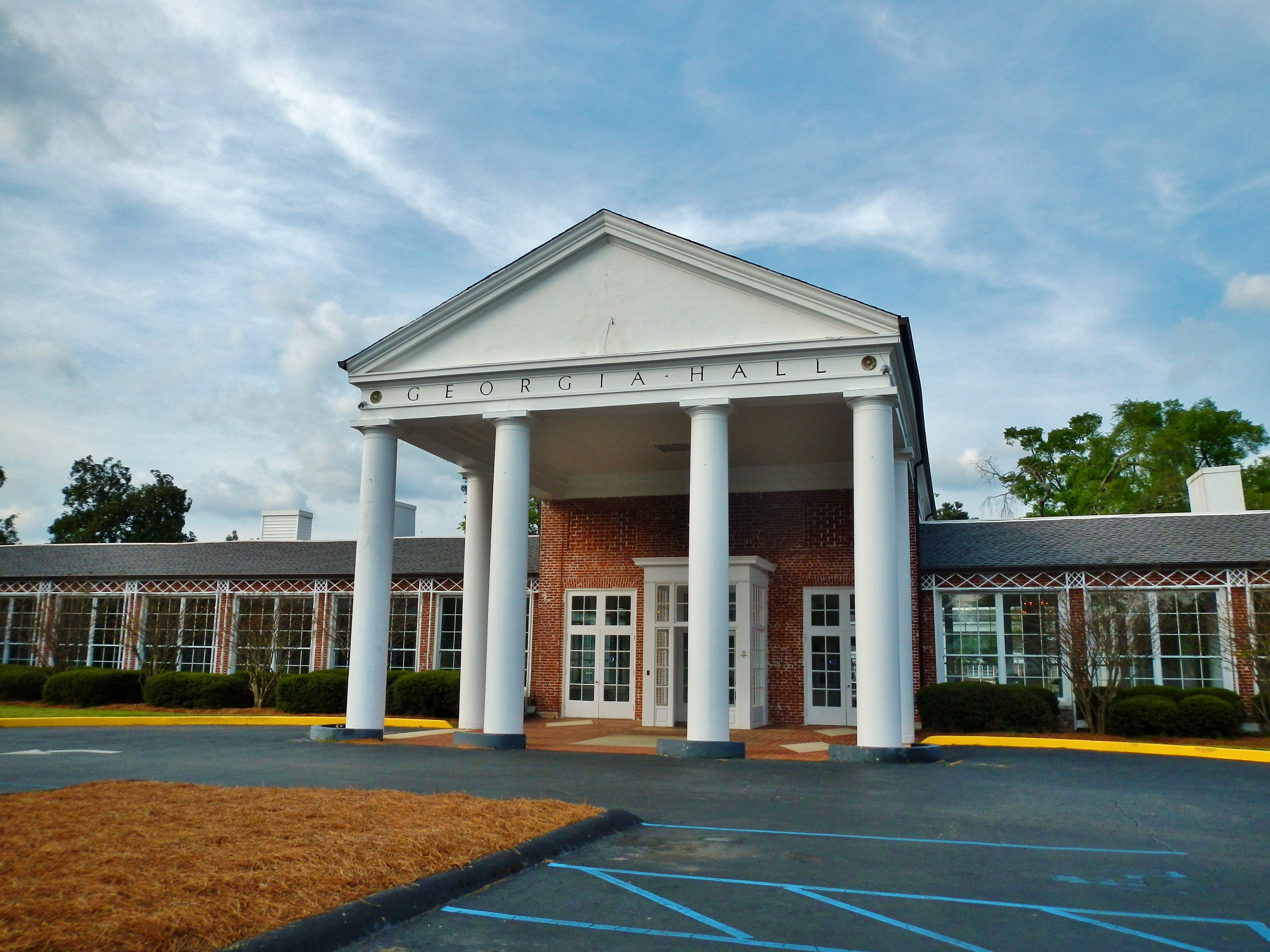
Georgia Hall, the main building of the Roosevelt Warm Springs Institute, was built in 1933. Roosevelt often hosted Thanksgiving dinners in its dining hall for those who were using the Springs. For much of its existence, the institute was the only such facility "exclusively devoted" to polio patients.

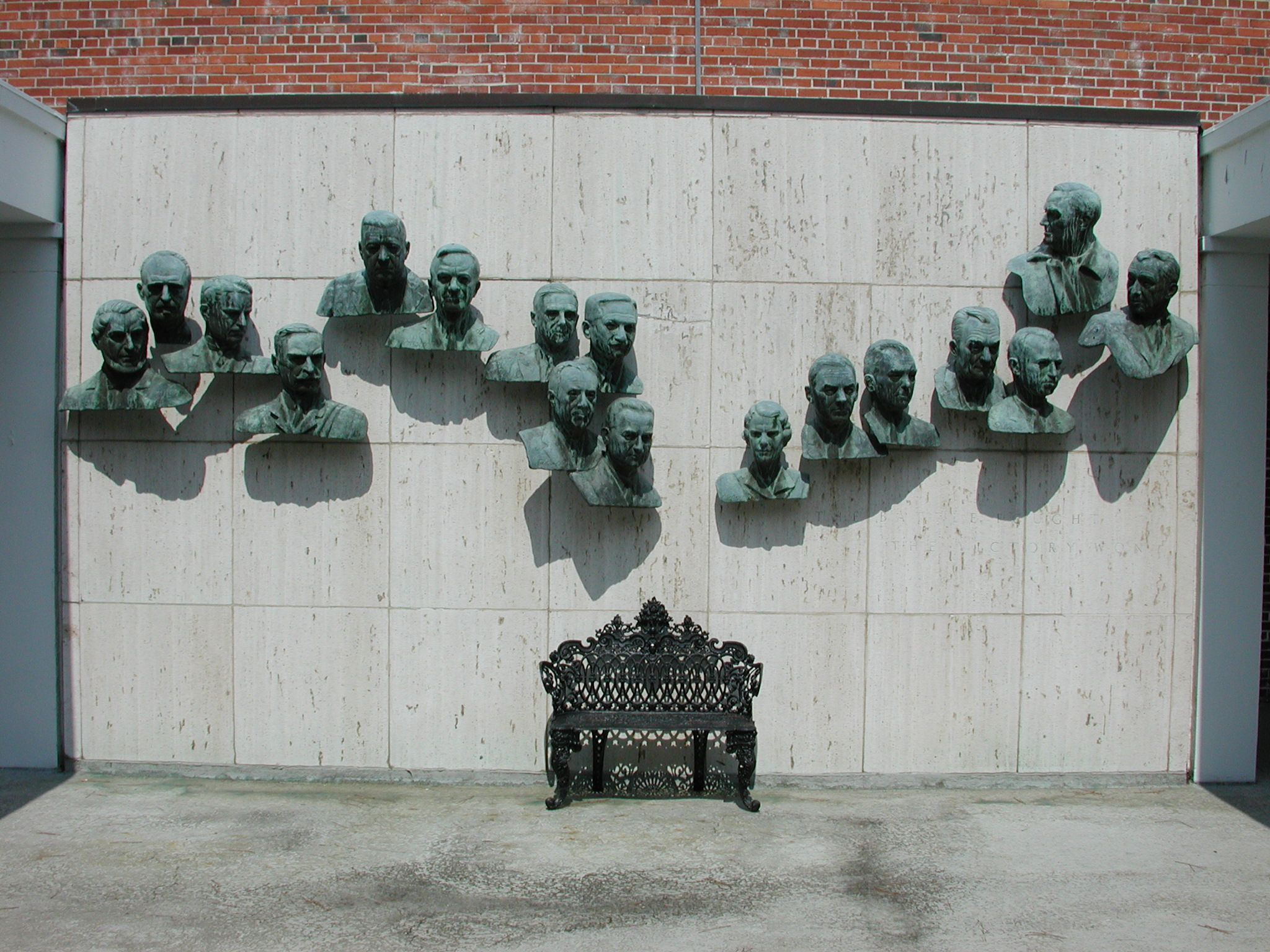
The Polio Hall of Fame (or the Polio Wall of Fame) consists of a linear grouping of sculptured busts of fifteen scientists and two laymen who made important contributions to the knowledge and treatment of poliomyelitis. It is found on the outside wall of what is called Founder's Hall of the Roosevelt Warm Springs Institute for Rehabilitation in Warm Springs, Georgia.

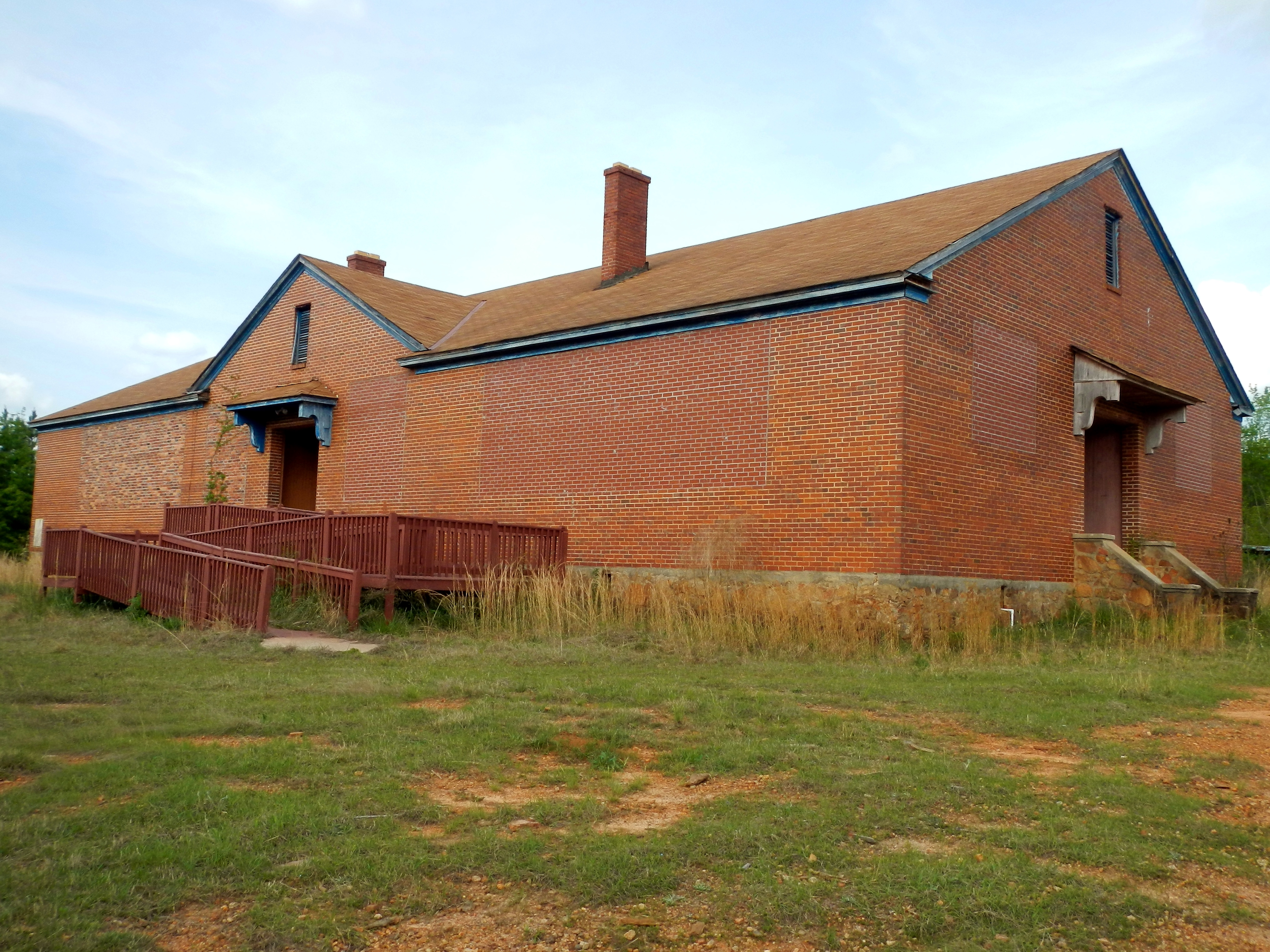
The Eleanor Roosevelt School in Warm Springs was built in 1936 and opened in 1937. It was the last Rosenwald school built in the United States using funds provided by the Julius Rosenwald Fund. The school operated from 1937 until 1972. The building was purchased privately in 1977. It was added to the National Register of Historic Places on May 3, 2010.

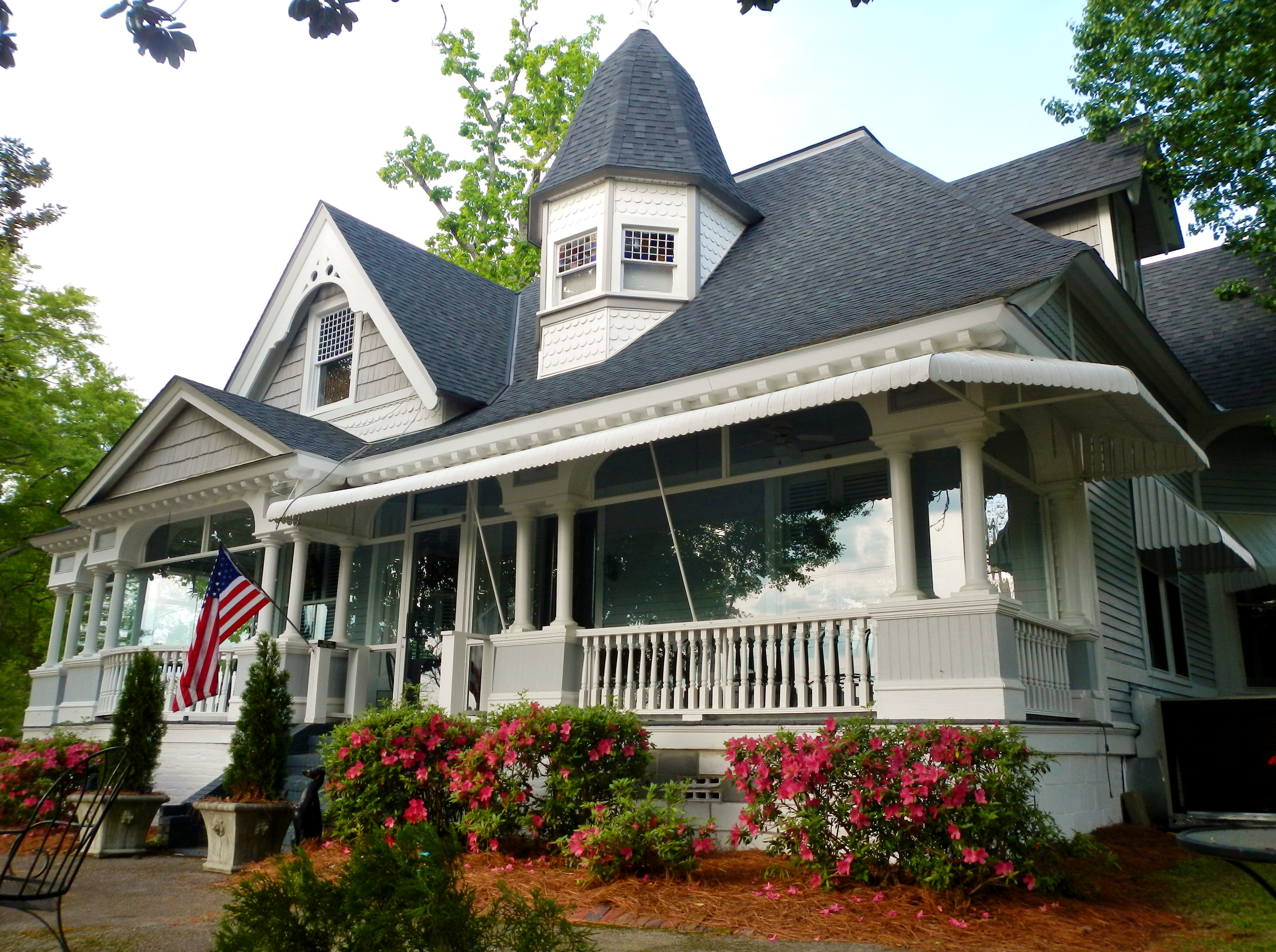
The Benjamin F. Bulloch House was built in the Queen Anne style in 1893 by Warm Springs' co-founder, Benjamin F. Bulloch. It was added to the National Register of Historic Places on May 26, 1994. For many years, the house was the location of The Bulloch House Restaurant. The Benjamin F. Bulloch House was completely destroyed by a fire on June 10, 2015.

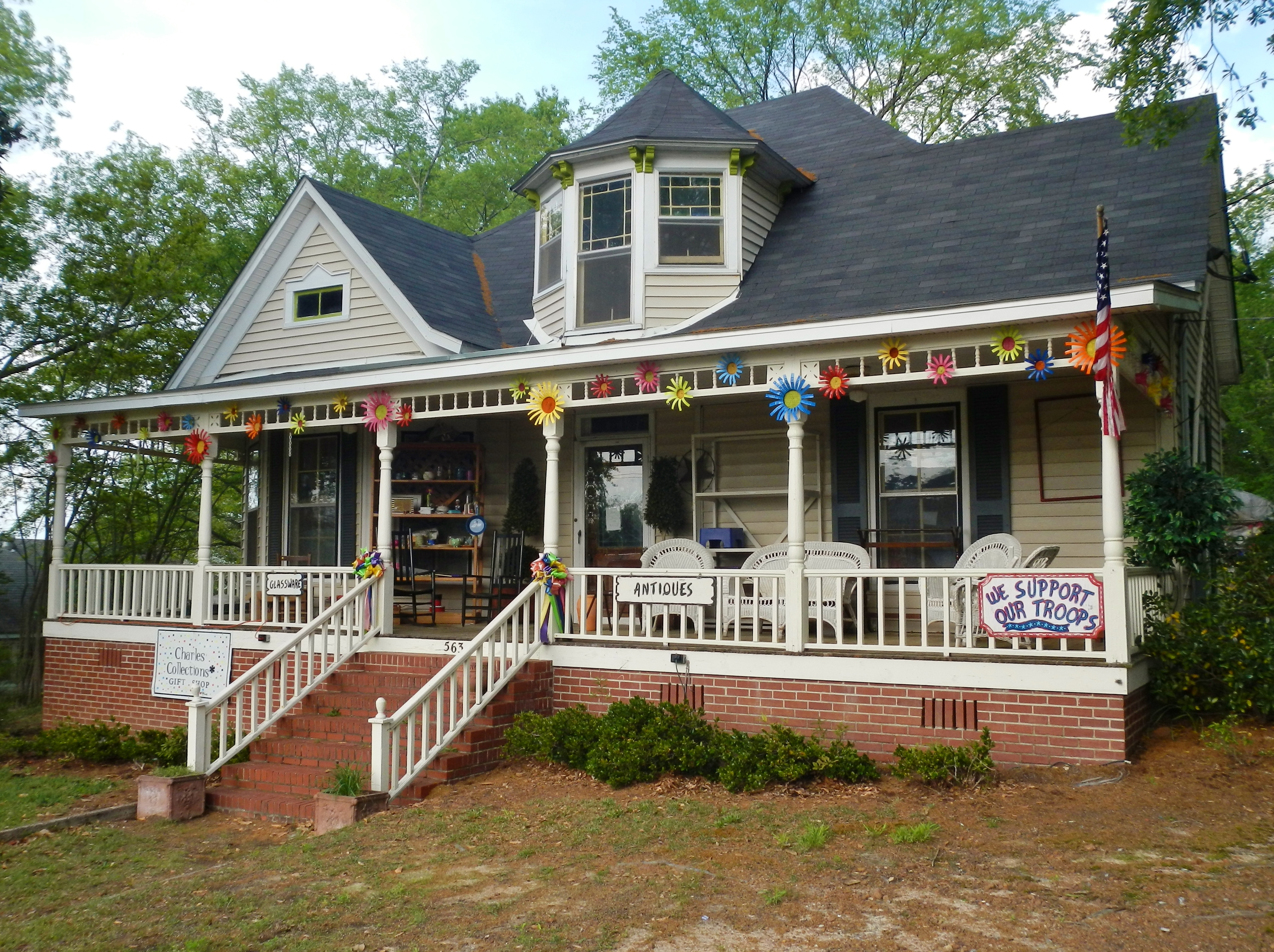
The Bulloch Family House is located at 5634 Spring St. It was added to the National Register of Historic Places on January 11, 2002.

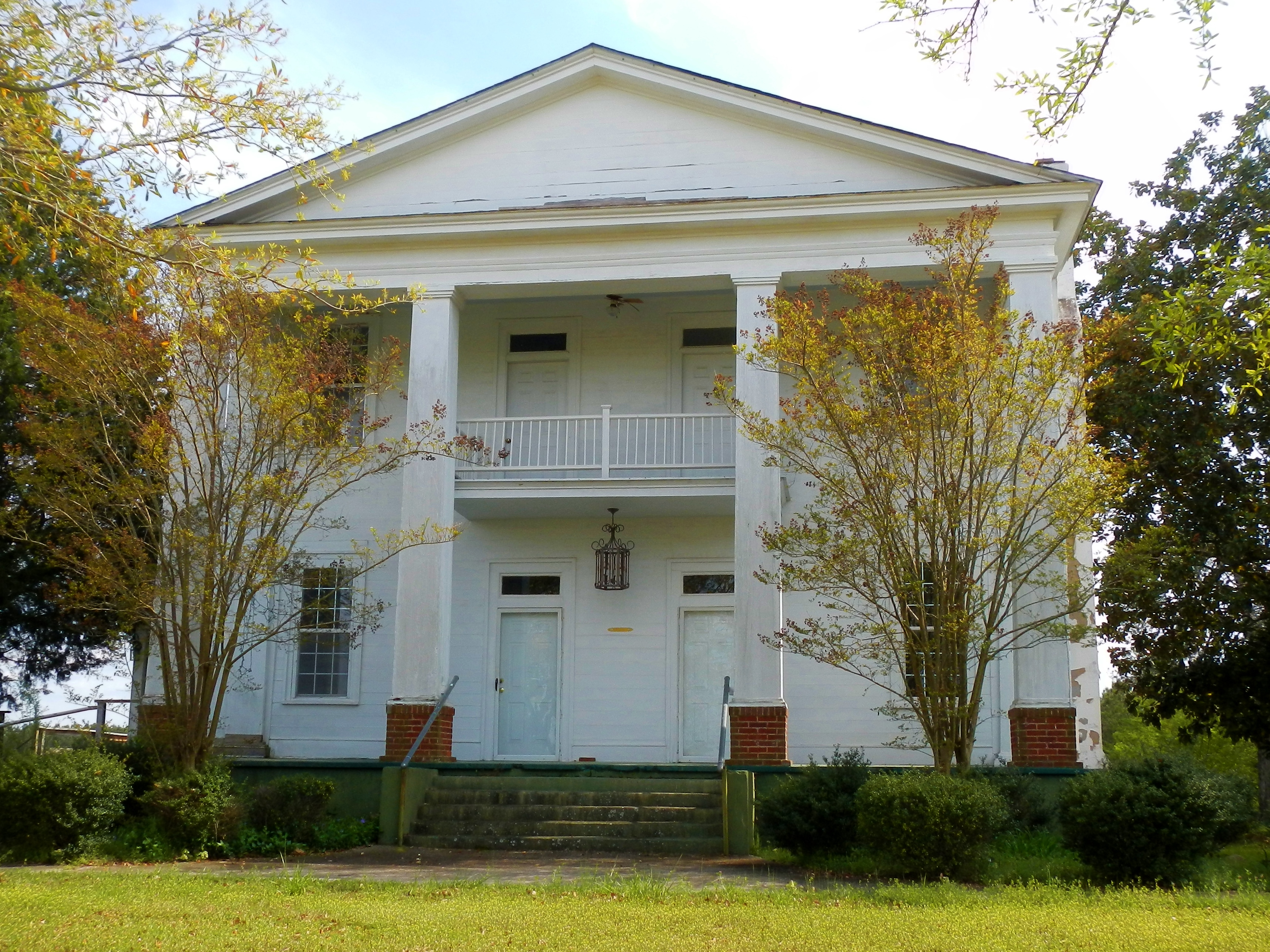
The Oakland Plantation Inn was built in 1829. It was added to the National Register of Historic Places on June 28, 1982.

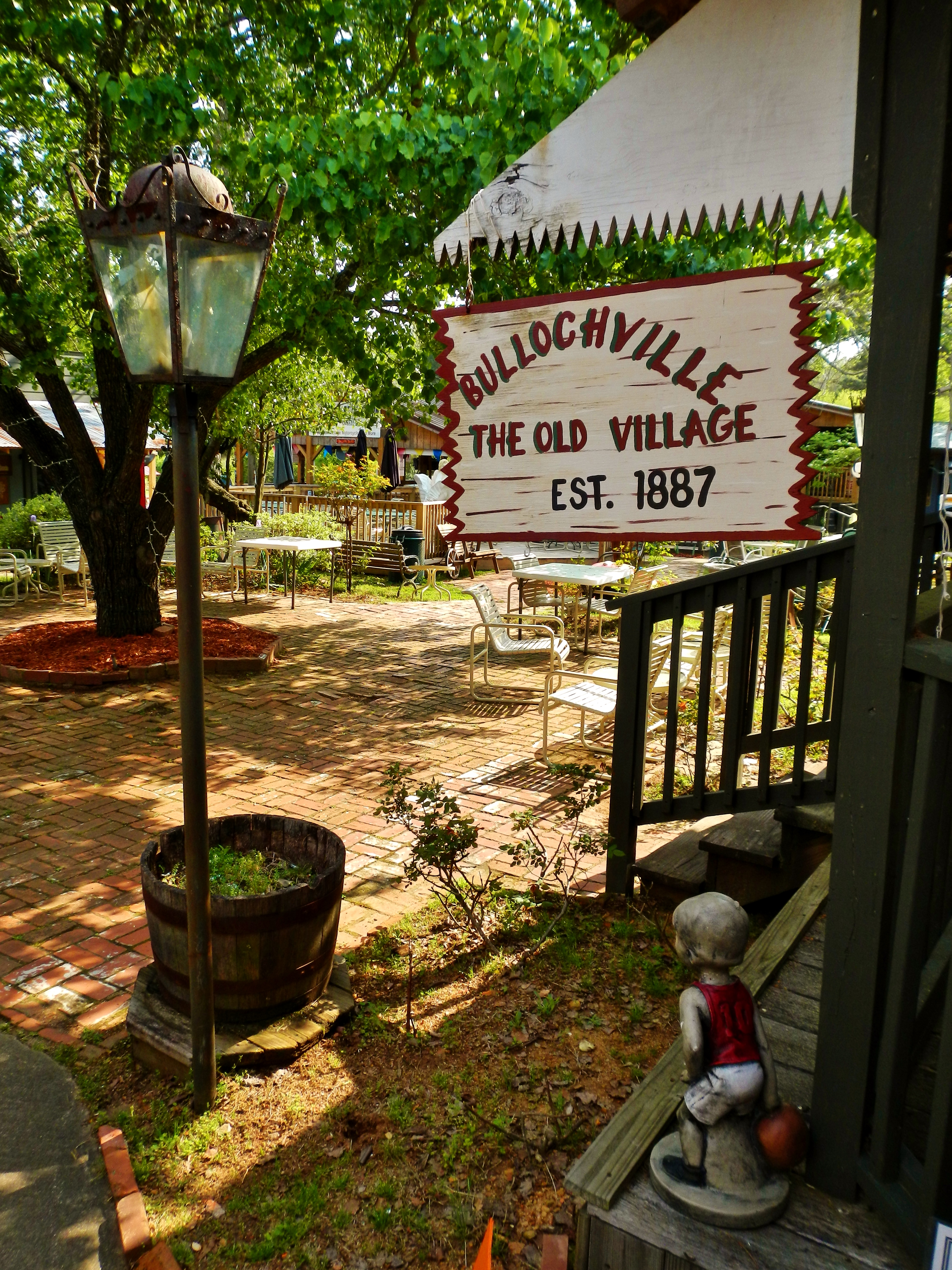
Warm Springs was originally named "Bullochville". The historic district of Old Bullochville is located in the center of town and is the site of the annual Watermelon Festival.

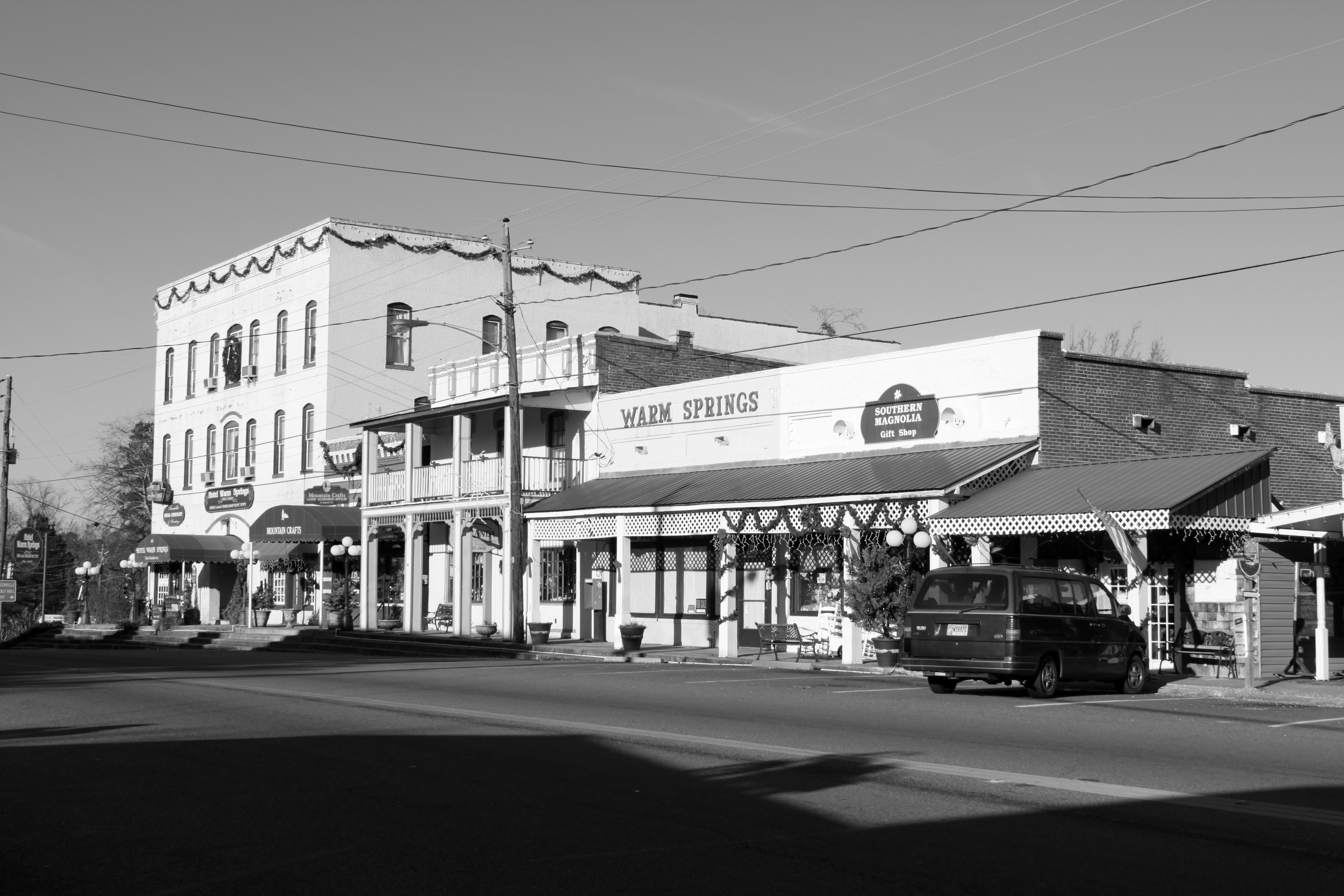
Downtown Warm Springs

== Relevant literature ==
- Harmon, Martin. 2014 The Warm Springs Story: Legacy and Legend. Macon, GA: Mercer University Press.
