= Greenville High School (Georgia) =

Public high school in Greenville, Georgia, United States

Location
- 17656 Roosevelt Highway; Greenville, Georgia 30222; United States; 33°2′28″N 84°42′45″W

Information
- Type: Public
- School district: Meriwether County School District
- Principal: Thaddeus Jackson
- Teaching staff: 23.90 (FTE)
- Grades: 9–12
- Enrollment: 212 (2023–2024)
- Student to teacher ratio: 8.87
- Colors: Red, White and Blue
- Mascot: The Mighty Patriot
- Nickname: Patriots
- Website: ghs.mcssga.org

Greenville High School is a public high school in Greenville, Georgia, United States.

== Notable alumni ==
- Mario Alford – professional football player, Grey Cup champion
- Kentavious Caldwell-Pope – professional basketball player
