= Meriwether County Courthouse =

- U.S. National Register of Historic Places
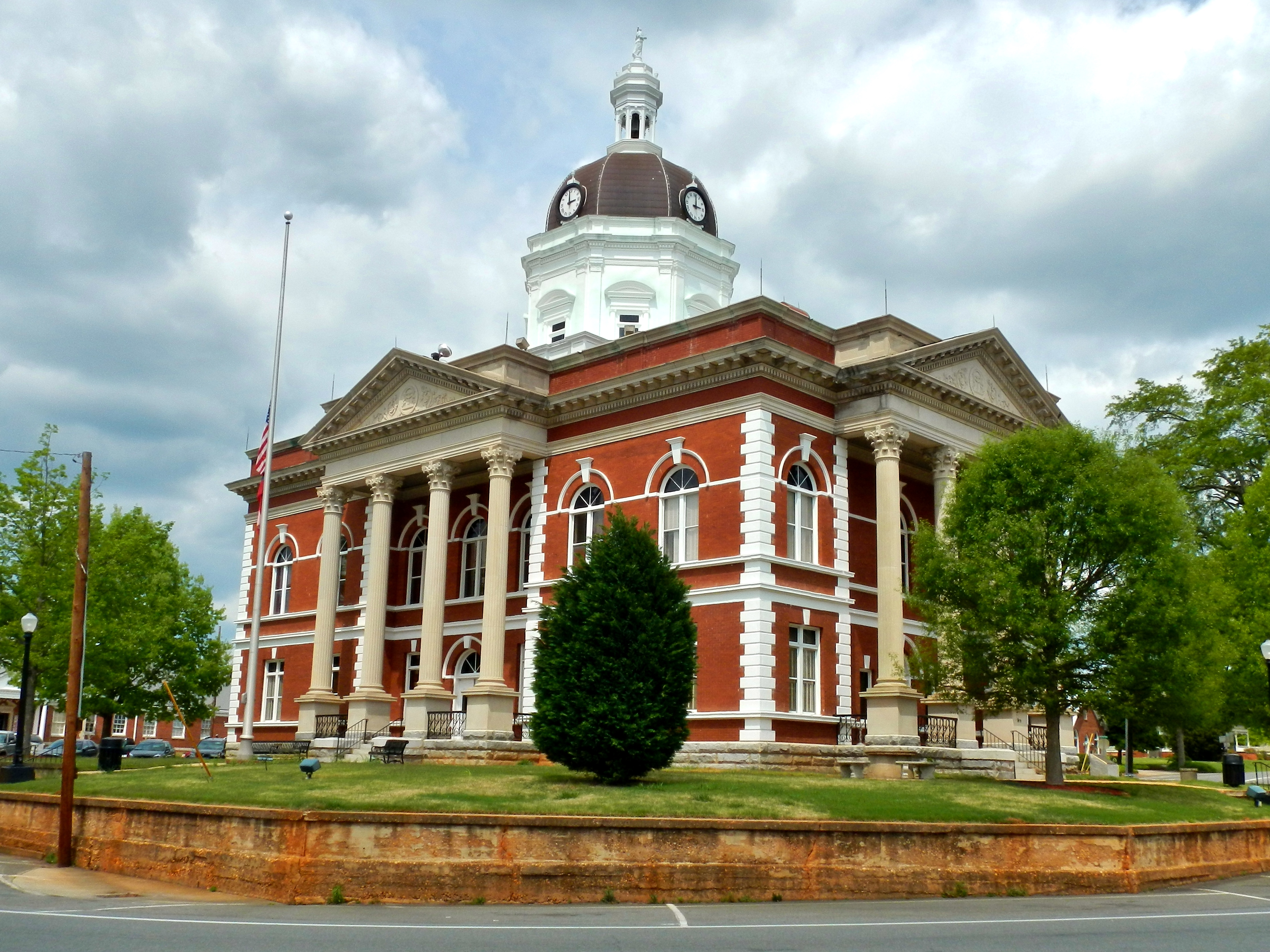

- Location within Georgia Location within the United States
- Location: Court Sq., Greenville, Georgia
- Coordinates: 33°01′42″N 84°42′45″W
- Area: 3 acres (1.2 ha)
- Built: 1903
- Architect: J. W. Golucke
- Architectural style: Colonial Revival, Georgian Revival
- NRHP reference No.: 73000630
- Added to NRHP: May 7, 1973

Meriwether County Courthouse is a historic county courthouse in Greenville, Georgia, county seat of Meriwether County, Georgia. It was added to the National Register of Historic Places on May 7, 1973.

The courthouse was built in 1903–1904 according to a Classical Revival design by J. W. Golucke. The courthouse replaced the county's first courthouse, built in 1832 and designed by William Hitchcock, which stood for seventy years.

The Meriwether County Courthouse was heavily damaged in a 1976 fire but was restored with a modified layout within the existing brick walls, and today houses county government offices. The courthouse is located on Court Square.

A Confederate monument is located on the courthouse grounds. It is an obelisk with the inscription on the base of "Our Soldiers" and "Lest We Forget." On the sides are an inscription giving a dedication to "the men from Meriwether County who have given their lives for their country" and an inscription stating that the monument was erected by the "grateful citizens of Meriwether County under the auspices of the David Meriwether Chapter Daughters of the American Revolution."

== See also ==
- National Register of Historic Places listings in Meriwether County, Georgia
