= Greenville Presbyterian Church (New York) =

Historic church in New York, United States

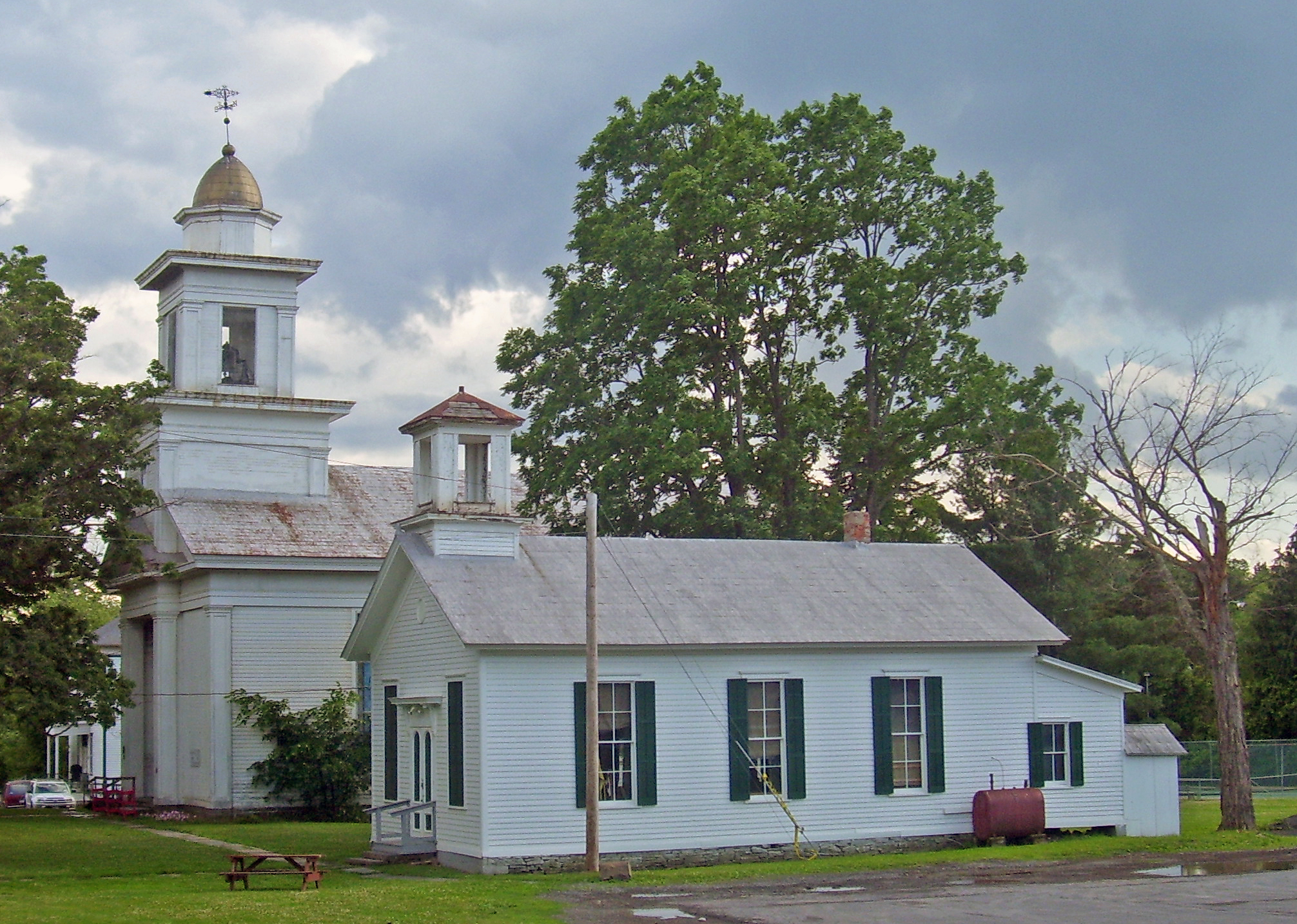
- East elevation and north profile of church and chapel (foreground), 2008

Religion
- Affiliation: Presbyterian
- Year consecrated: 1860
- Status: Not active

Location
- Location: Greenville, NY
- Interactive map of Greenville Presbyterian Church
- Coordinates: 42°25′0″N 74°01′22″W

Architecture
- Type: church and chapel
- Style: Greek Revival
- Groundbreaking: 1860
- Completed: 1860

Specifications
- Direction of façade: East
- Materials: Wood

U.S. National Register of Historic Places
- Added to NRHP: March 28, 1985
- NRHP Reference no.: 85000657

The Greenville Presbyterian Church is located on NY 32 just north of its intersection with NY 81 in Greenville, New York, United States. Its three buildings on two acres were listed on the National Register of Historic Places (NRHP) in 1985.

The church itself was established in 1790, the first non-Dutch church in the Catskill region. Its current building dates to 1860, and is a well-designed late example of the Greek Revival architectural style. The chapel and former school building, now part of the local library, were added in 1885 and 1906 respectively.

== Church complex ==
There are three buildings considered contributing properties to the NRHP listing. All are located on a strip of land along the west side of Route 32 just north of the Route 81 intersection in the center of Greenville. To the immediate west is property owned by the Town of Greenville, and Greenville High School.

=== Church ===
The church itself is a one-and-a-half-story structure on a stone foundation sided in clapboard on all sides save the east-facing front, done in flush board. That facade has square pillars and a pediment topped by a three-story tower with a belfry and octagonal gold-colored spire with weathervane. The tower's three sections all feature corner pilasters and overhanging eaves. A small stained glass window looks out from the front of the base section.

Behind the pillars is the main entrance, framed by pilasters supporting a full entablature with another stained glass window above. On either side the double doors have a fluted Ionic column in front of a small window. Paneled corner pilasters support the gabled roof and its cornice, with a full entablature. Both north and south profiles are fenestrated with four 16-by-4-foot (4.9 by 1.2 m) stained glass windows, with an additional smaller one on the north. The rear has cornice returns and a single double-hung sash window in the gable. A brick chimney rises from the south side of the roof.

Inside, the vestibule is flanked by small rooms. In the nave, oak pews become curved toward the chancel. There, the dark oak pulpit is raised and flanked by similar balustrades on either side. Behind it is a large pedimented cornice with similar pilasters and columns to the entrance. The organ is located in the recess. At the rear of the church is a gallery and the stairs to the bell tower. The interior is lit with a chandelier over the pulpit and teardrop lights over the congregation. The ceiling is plaster with canted corners. On the side walls there is wainscoting and a molded entablature, with all the large windows having broad molded surrounds.

=== Chapel ===
The chapel building, built a quarter-century later, is similar to the church, on a smaller scale. It is a one-story clapboard building on a stone block foundation with a shallow gabled roof and smaller belltower with tent roof. Its facade shows some Italianate influence such as an overhanging cornice with full entablature. The chapel's double-doored entrance is itself topped by a projecting cornice with scroll-sawn brackets and drop pendants.

Its rear has a small shed-roofed wing with windows and a door with small projecting gable. The interior of the chapel has been altered, but retains its original wainscoting and window surrounds.

=== Greenville Free Academy building ===
The school building, newest of the three, is a square two-story building of similar materials with a pyramidal roof pierced by a brick chimney just south of the peak. It comes to exposed rafter ends at the roofline's overhanging eaves. The entrance is a reconstruction of the one on the previous school building, a porch with Doric columns supporting a full balustrade and a double-doored entrance with broad transom. The interior has been extensively renovated but still has its original tin-embossed ceiling on the first floor hall.

=== Aesthetics ===
The Greek Revival style gained popularity in the 1820s with a nation that saw itself carrying on the classical ideals of freedom and democracy. By the 1850s it had run its course, with few new residential, commercial or public structures using it. But it remained popular for churches until the Civil War, and the Greenville church is a well-developed, sophisticated late application of the style, using the classical forms correctly and with a high degree of decoration.

The school building, now used as the town library and administrative offices, is also of some architectural note. While it typifies the rural school designs of the early 20th century, it is an unusually large example.

== History ==
The Greenville area, known originally as Freehold, was first prepared for settlement by Augustine Prevost, who received a 7,000-acre (2,800 ha) patent from the British Crown in 1767 as a reward for his service during the French and Indian War. He built roads and mills, and continued to own the property through the Revolution. In the 1790s, his efforts paid off as a new wave of pioneers came to New York, the younger sons of New England farmers and their families.

Although there were already long-established communities along the Hudson River, the New Englanders avoided them as they were leery of the Dutch-descended inhabitants and their language, religion and customs. They organized their congregation in 1790, receiving a two-acre gift from Prevost that restricted the property's future use to educational and religious purposes. It was the first non-Dutch church in the Catskill region.

The original meeting house was built in 1793 on a site just to the northwest of the current church. In 1794 the congregation formally incorporated and called the Rev. Beriah Hotchkiss to be its pastor, and in 1796 it became affiliated with the Northern Association Presbytery. Four years later, at the turn of the century, a newer, larger meeting house was built. It was described as having "a lofty spire, a spacious gallery, unpainted box pews, and an octagonal pulpit supported by a lofty column". The original meeting house was bought and moved to a nearby site, going through several uses before it was eventually demolished.

In 1815 the educational aspect of the land gift was secured with the construction of the first Greenville Free Academy Building, the first free public school in Greene County. Nine years later the church formally became known as the Greenville Presbyterian Church when it joined the Synod of Albany.

The meeting hall was expanded and remodeled in 1845. At the beginning of 1859 that work was lost when it burned down. The current church was its replacement, although a marble commemorative plaque was not placed over the door until 1872. A quarter-century later, in 1885, its original mahogany pulpit was replaced along with its white pews. The chapel was built the same year to accommodate smaller functions such as prayer gatherings and meetings of the board of trustees.

The stained-glass windows were added to the church between 1904 and 1913. During that time, in 1906, the new school building was built. In 1930, the school became part of the new Greenville Central School District and was extensively renovated by the Presbyterian Society. The chapel was sold to the local American Legion post in 1938 and has since been used by them and a local Boy Scout troop.

The school building underwent further renovations to become the Greenville library in 1957. In 1975 the porch was remodeled to resemble the porch on the 1815 building. There have been no significant alterations to the property since.
