= Greenville Presbyterian Church and Cemetery =

Historic site in Meriwether County, Georgia

- U.S. National Register of Historic Places
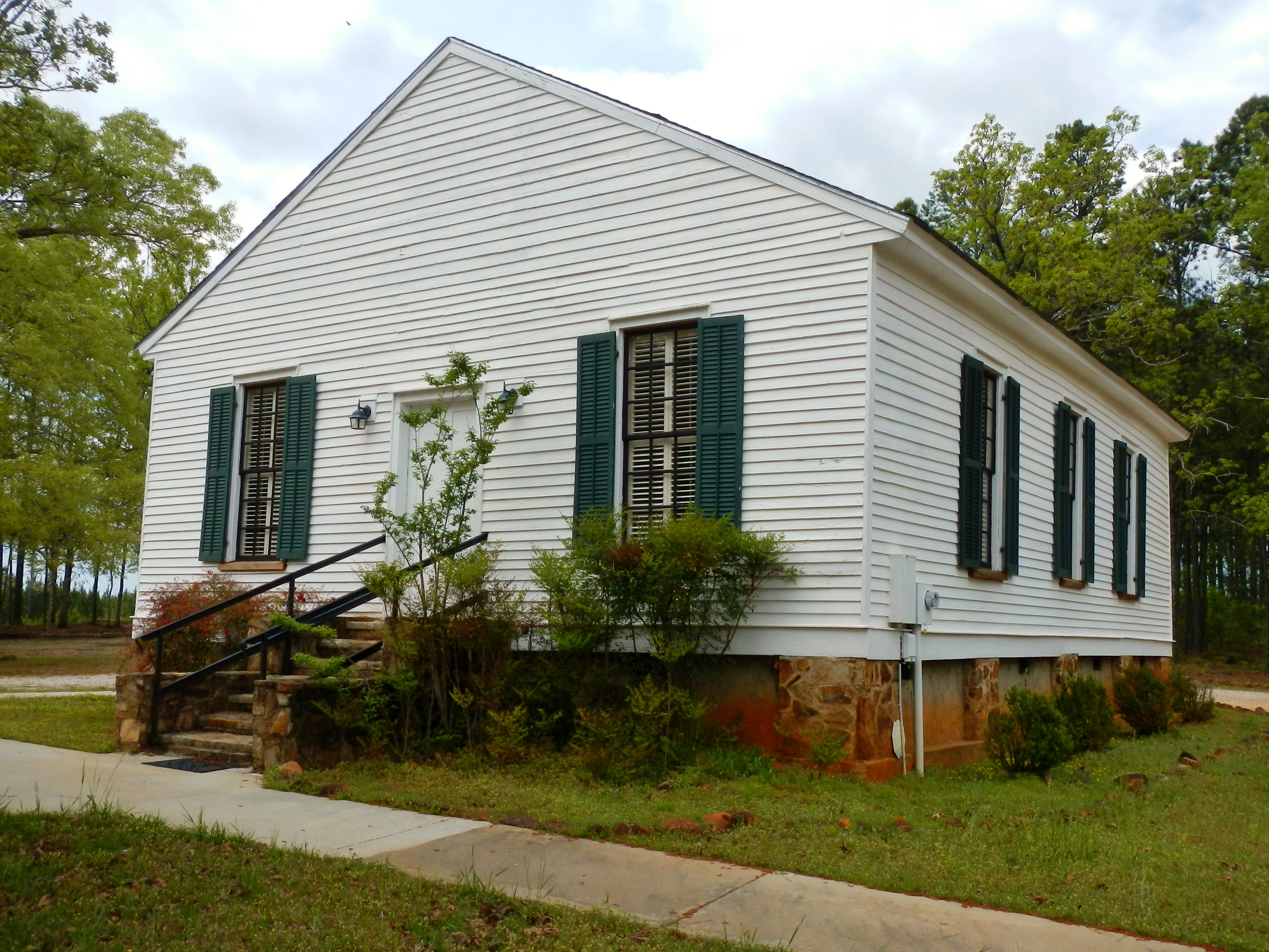
- Greenville Presbyterian Church in 2013.

- Location within Georgia Location within the United States
- Nearest city: Greenville, Georgia
- Coordinates: 33°3′56″N 84°42′19″W
- Area: 3.4 acres (1.4 ha)
- Built: 1836
- Architectural style: Rural vernacular church
- NRHP reference No.: 01001555
- Added to NRHP: February 5, 2002

Greenville Presbyterian Church and Cemetery is a historic church that was organized in 1829 and, along with its cemetery, is located in Greenville, Georgia. The church building was built in 1836. The property was added to the National Register in 2002.

The church building is a one-story 29 by 45 feet (8.8 m × 13.7 m) wood-frame building with wood lap siding on a continuous brick foundation over older piers.
