= Greenville, Georgia =

- City
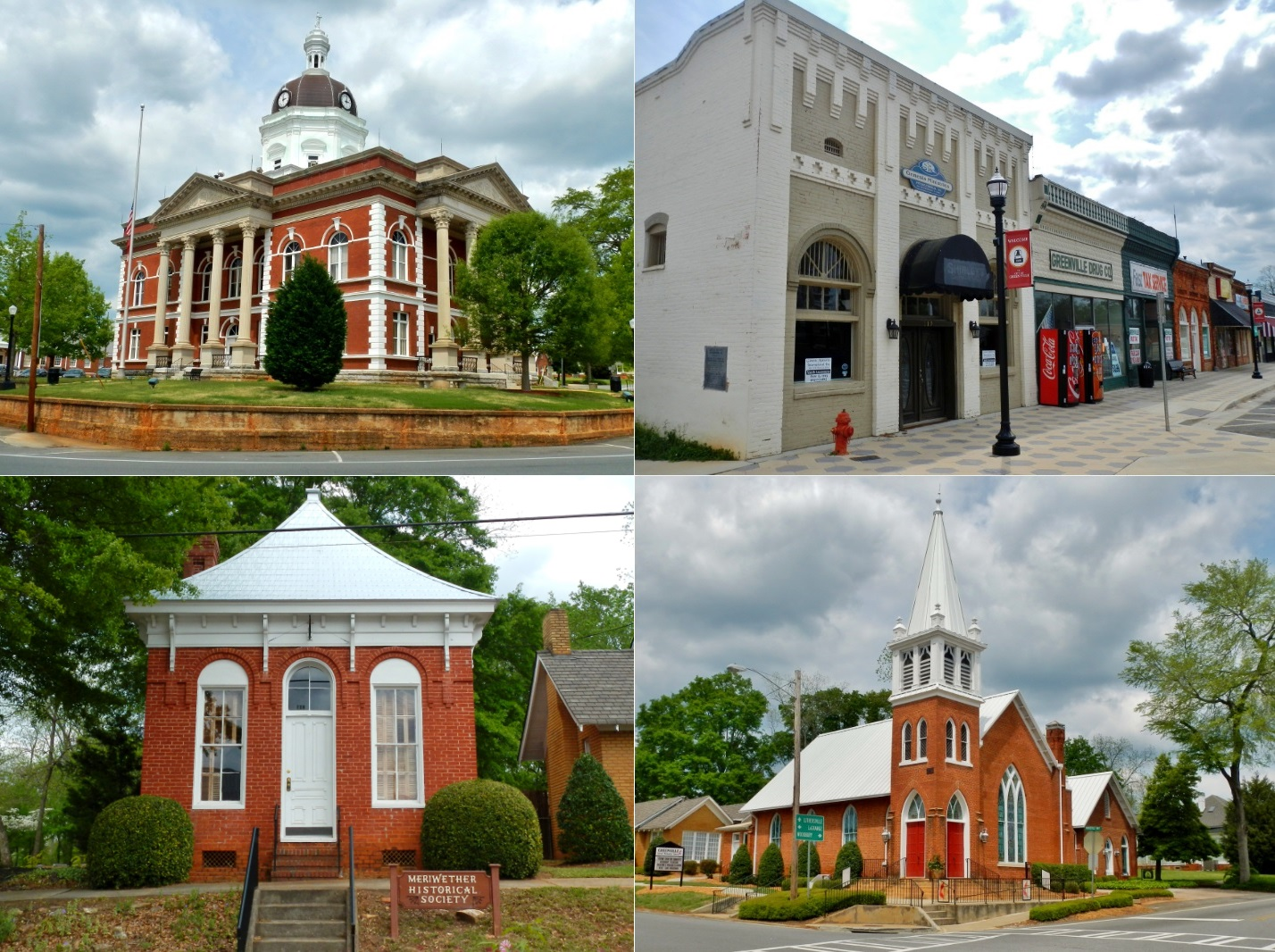
- The Greenville Historic District was added to the National Register of Historic Places on March 16, 1990.

- Location in Meriwether County and the state of Georgia
- Coordinates: 33°1′40″N 84°42′49″W
- Country: United States
- State: Georgia
- County: Meriwether

Area
  - Total: 2.36 sq mi (6.11 km^{2})
  - Land: 2.34 sq mi (6.07 km^{2})
  - Water: 0.015 sq mi (0.04 km^{2})
- Elevation: 869 ft (265 m)

Population (2020)
  - Total: 794
  - Density: 338.7/sq mi (130.78/km^{2})
- Time zone: UTC-5 (Eastern (EST))
  - Summer (DST): UTC-4 (EDT)
- ZIP code: 30222
- Area code: 706
- FIPS code: 13-35016
- GNIS feature ID: 0356105
- Website: cityofgreenvillega.com

Greenville is a city in and the county seat of Meriwether County, Georgia, United States. The population was 794 at the 2020 census, down from 876 in 2010. The city is located 60 miles (97 km) southwest of Atlanta and is part of the Atlanta metropolitan area (Atlanta-Sandy Springs-Marietta, Georgia Metropolitan Statistical Area).

== History ==
Greenville was founded in 1828 as the seat of the newly formed Meriwether County. The city was named for Major General Nathanael Greene, commander of the rebel American forces at the Battle of Guilford Court House on March 15, 1781.

== Geography ==
Greenville is located in central Meriwether County at 33°1′40″N 84°42′49″W (33.027845, -84.713562). U.S. Route 27 Alternate and Georgia State Routes 109 and 100 intersect in the center of the city at the county courthouse. US 27 Alternate leads north 25 miles (40 km) to Newnan and south 49 miles (79 km) to Columbus, while State Route 109 leads southeast 8 miles (13 km) to Woodbury and west 20 miles (32 km) to LaGrange. State Route 100 leads northwest 16 miles (26 km) to Hogansville.

According to the United States Census Bureau, the city has a total area of 2.4 square miles (6.2 km^{2}), of which 0.01 square miles (0.03 km^{2}), or 0.59%, are water. The city drains to the south into Walnut Creek and to the east into Kennel Creek, a tributary. Walnut Creek is an east-flowing tributary of Red Oak Creek and part of the Flint River watershed.

== Demographics ==
Historical population
Census	Pop.	Note	%±
1880	490		—
1900	815		—
1910	909		11.5%
1920	760		−16.4%
1930	672		−11.6%
1940	683		1.6%
1950	733		7.3%
1960	726		−1.0%
1970	1,085		49.4%
1980	1,213		11.8%
1990	1,167		−3.8%
2000	946		−18.9%
2010	876		−7.4%
2020	794		−9.4%
U.S. Decennial Census

=== Racial and ethnic composition ===
Greenville city, Georgia – Racial and ethnic composition Note: the US Census treats Hispanic/Latino as an ethnic category. This table excludes Latinos from the racial categories and assigns them to a separate category. Hispanics/Latinos may be of any race.
Race / Ethnicity (NH = Non-Hispanic)	Pop 2000	Pop 2010	Pop 2020	% 2000	% 2010	% 2020
White alone (NH)	250	201	288	26.43%	22.95%	36.27%
Black or African American alone (NH)	689	641	473	72.83%	73.17%	59.57%
Native American or Alaska Native alone (NH)	1	5	0	0.11%	0.57%	0.00%
Asian alone (NH)	0	11	0	0.00%	1.26%	0.00%
Native Hawaiian or Pacific Islander alone (NH)	1	0	0	0.11%	0.00%	0.00%
Other race alone (NH)	0	1	0	0.00%	0.11%	0.00%
Mixed race or Multiracial (NH)	2	13	24	0.21%	1.48%	3.02%
Hispanic or Latino (any race)	3	4	9	0.32%	0.46%	1.13%
Total	946	876	794	100.00%	100.00%	100.00%

=== 2020 census ===
As of the 2020 United States census, there were 794 people, 368 households, and 219 families residing in the city.

== Education ==
=== Meriwether County School District ===
The Meriwether County School District holds pre-school to grade twelve, and consists of three elementary schools, two middle schools, and two high schools. The district has 300 full-time teachers and over 3,948 students.

- George E. Washington Elementary School
- Mountain View Elementary School
- Unity Elementary School
- Greenville Middle School
- Manchester Middle School
- Greenville High School
- Manchester High School

== Notable people ==
- Mario Alford, wide receiver for the Cincinnati Bengals of the NFL
- Kentavious Caldwell-Pope, 2013 SEC Player of the Year, eighth overall selection in the 2013 NBA draft by the Detroit Pistons and 2x NBA champion.
- Lella A. Dillard, president, Georgia Woman's Christian Temperance Union
- Y. Frank Freeman, executive with Paramount Pictures
- Clara Ann Howard, Baptist missionary in Africa, longtime staff member at Spelman College
- William J. Samford, 31st governor of Alabama
- Joseph M. Terrell, 57th governor of Georgia (October 25, 1902 – June 29, 1907); from Greenville, buried in the local cemetery
- Hiram Warner, one of the original members of the Supreme Court of Georgia, eventually becoming that court's second chief justice. Warner also held office as a circuit court judge, a representative in the Georgia General Assembly, and a U.S. congressman.
- Jontavious Willis, country blues singer, guitarist, songwriter, and multi-instrumentalist

== Gallery ==
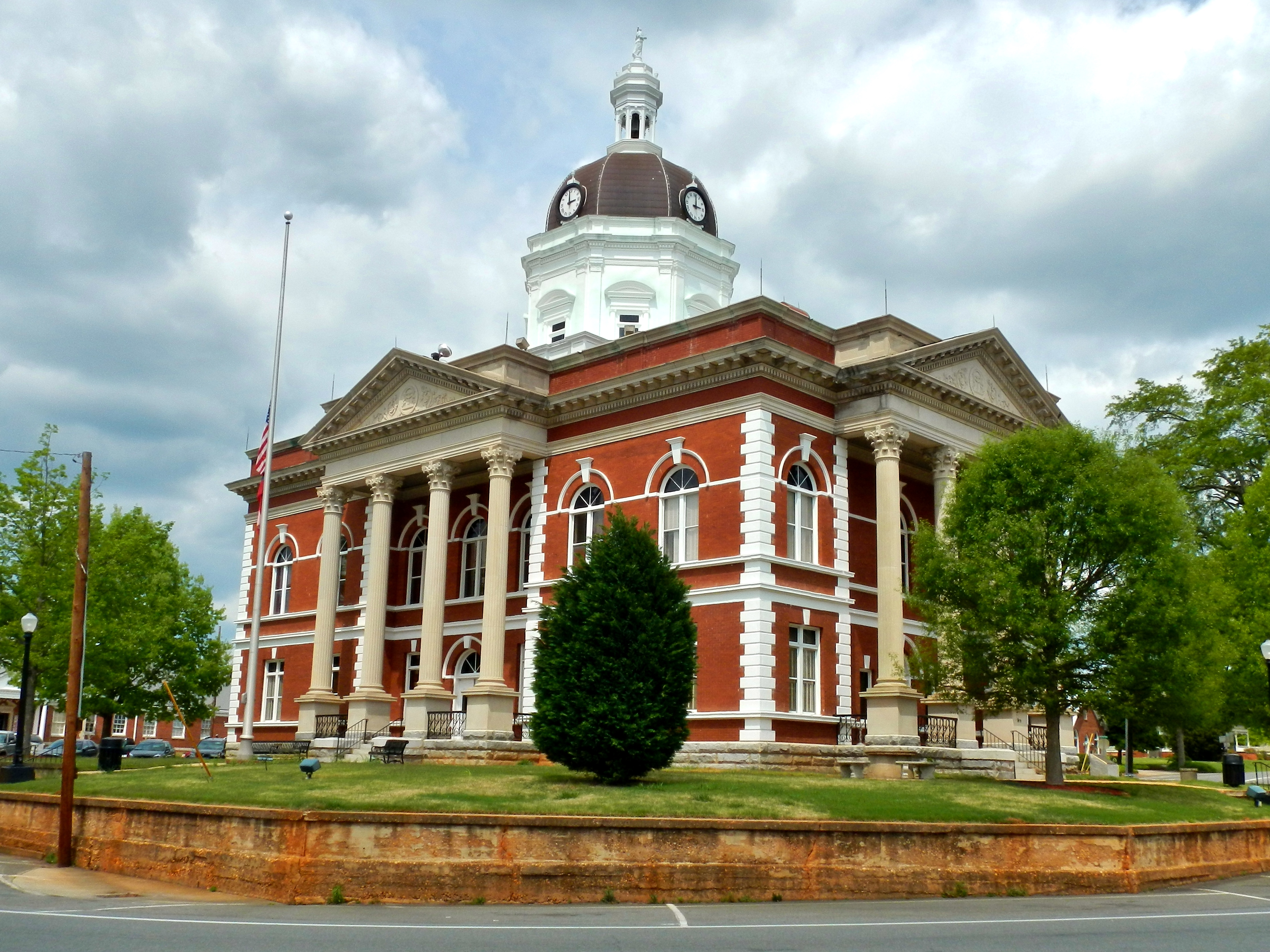
The Meriwether County Courthouse is located in Greenville, the county seat.

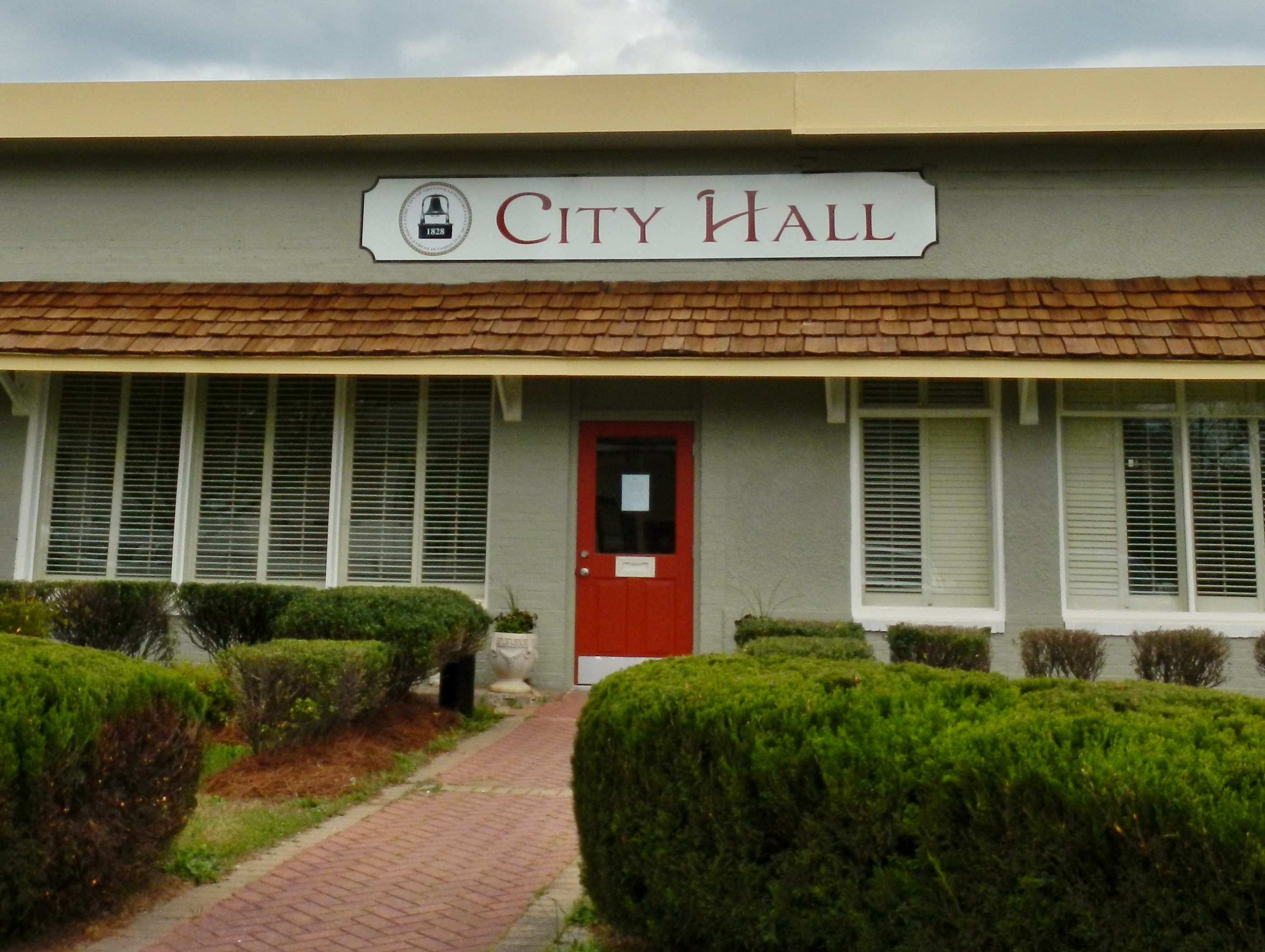
Greenville City Hall

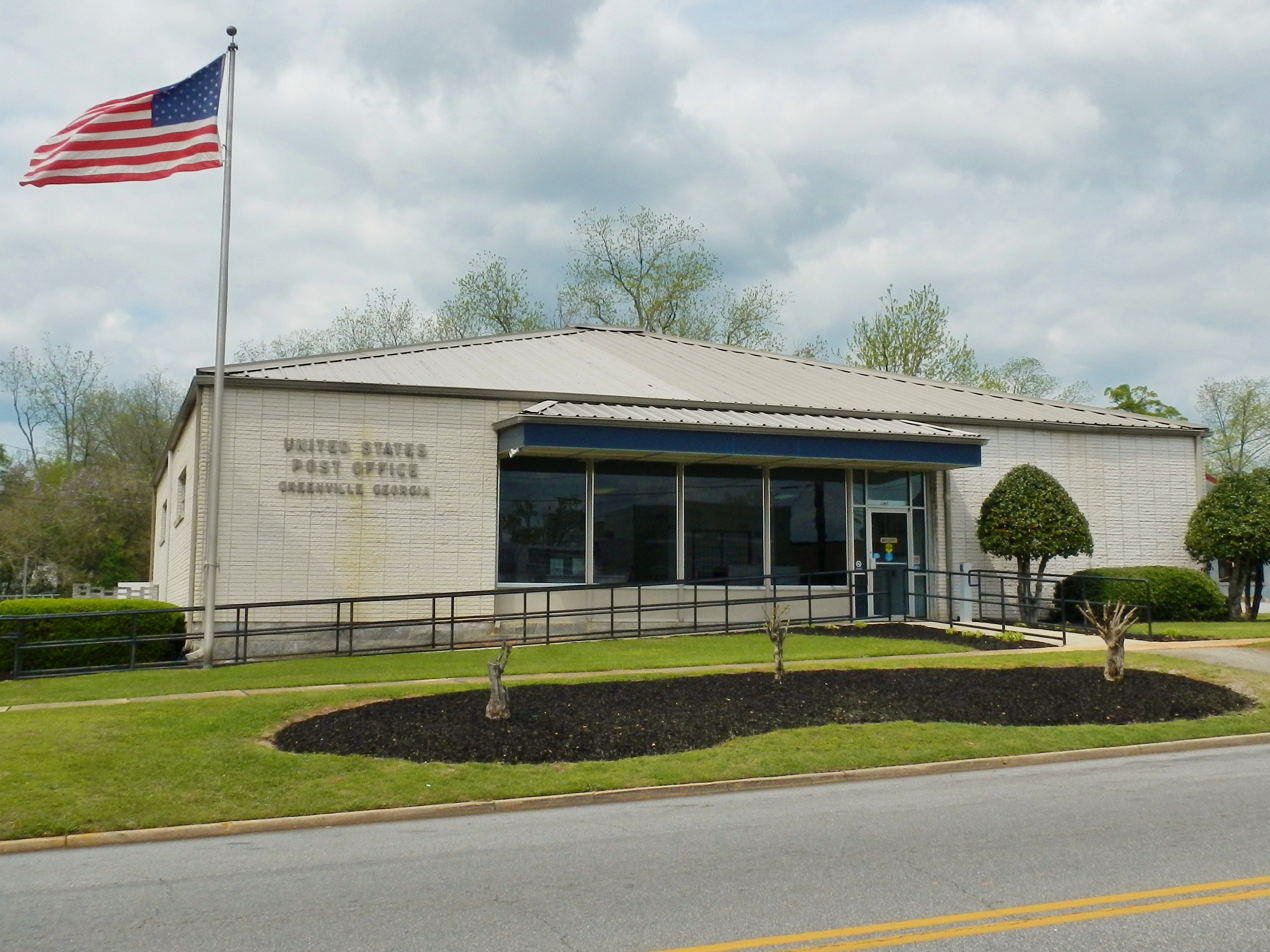
Greenville Post Office (ZIP code: 30222)

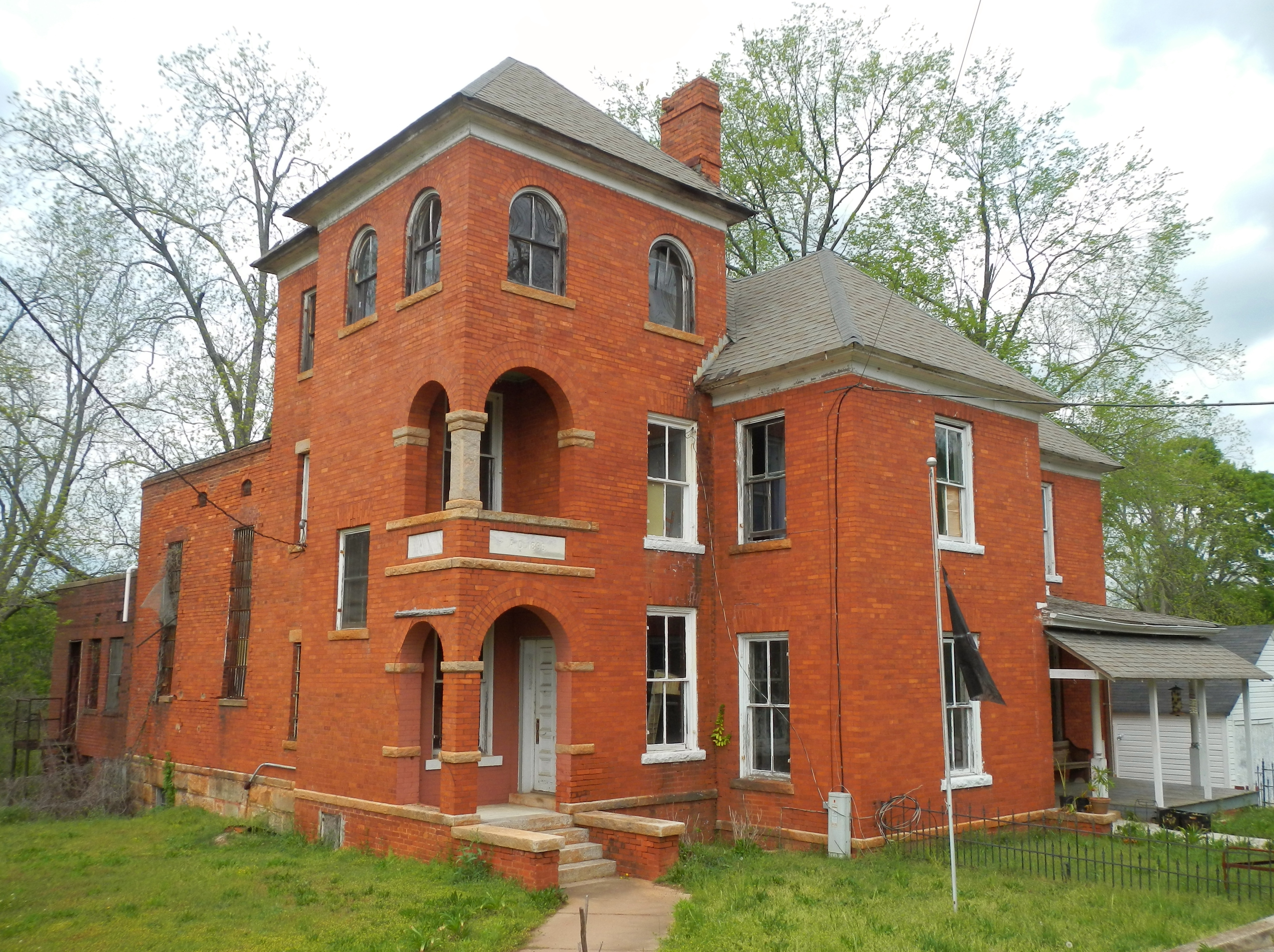
The Meriwether County Jail was built in 1896 and added to the National Register of Historic Places on May 7, 1973.

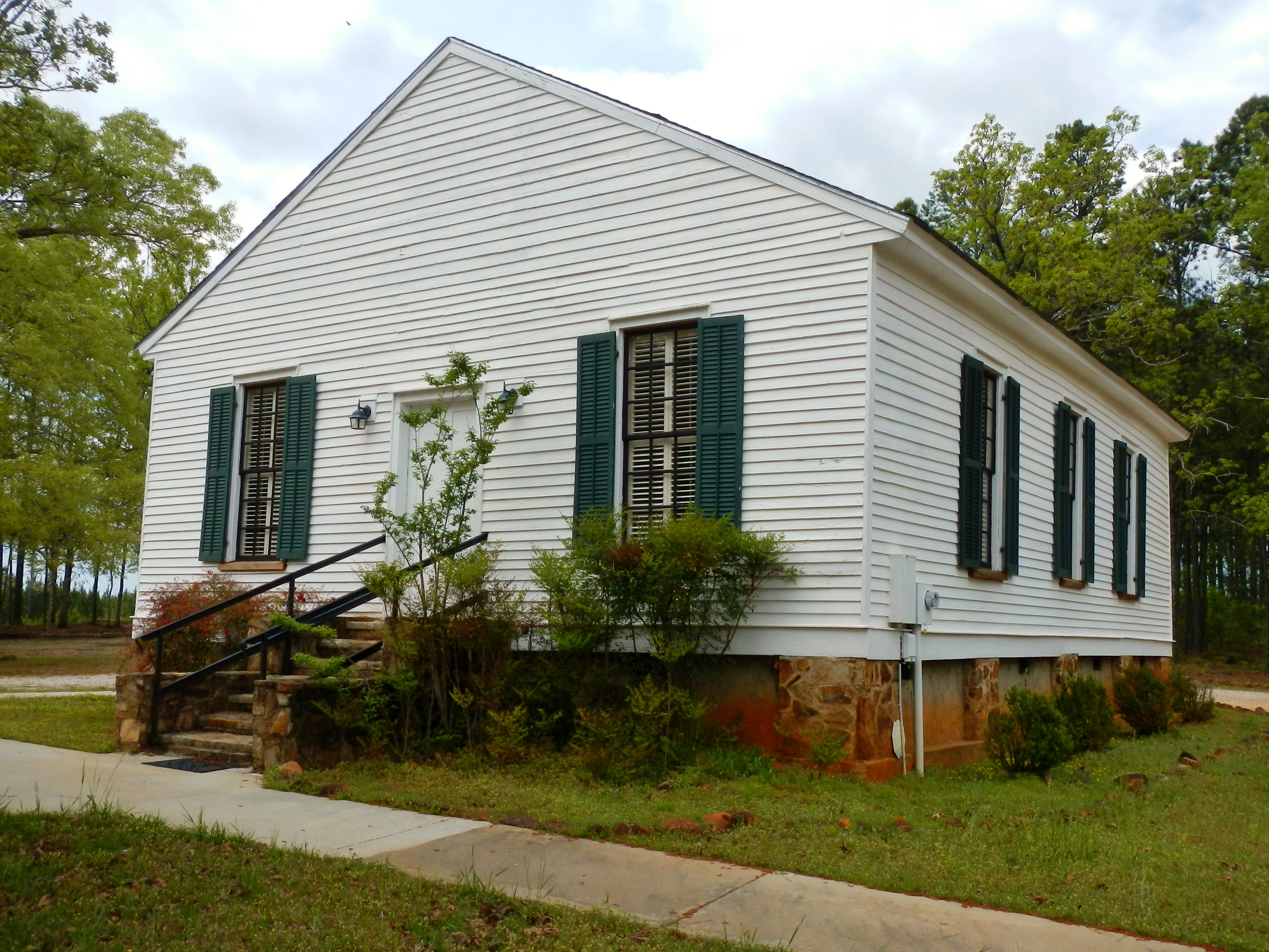
The Greenville Presbyterian Church and Cemetery was added to the National Register of Historic Places on February 5, 2002.

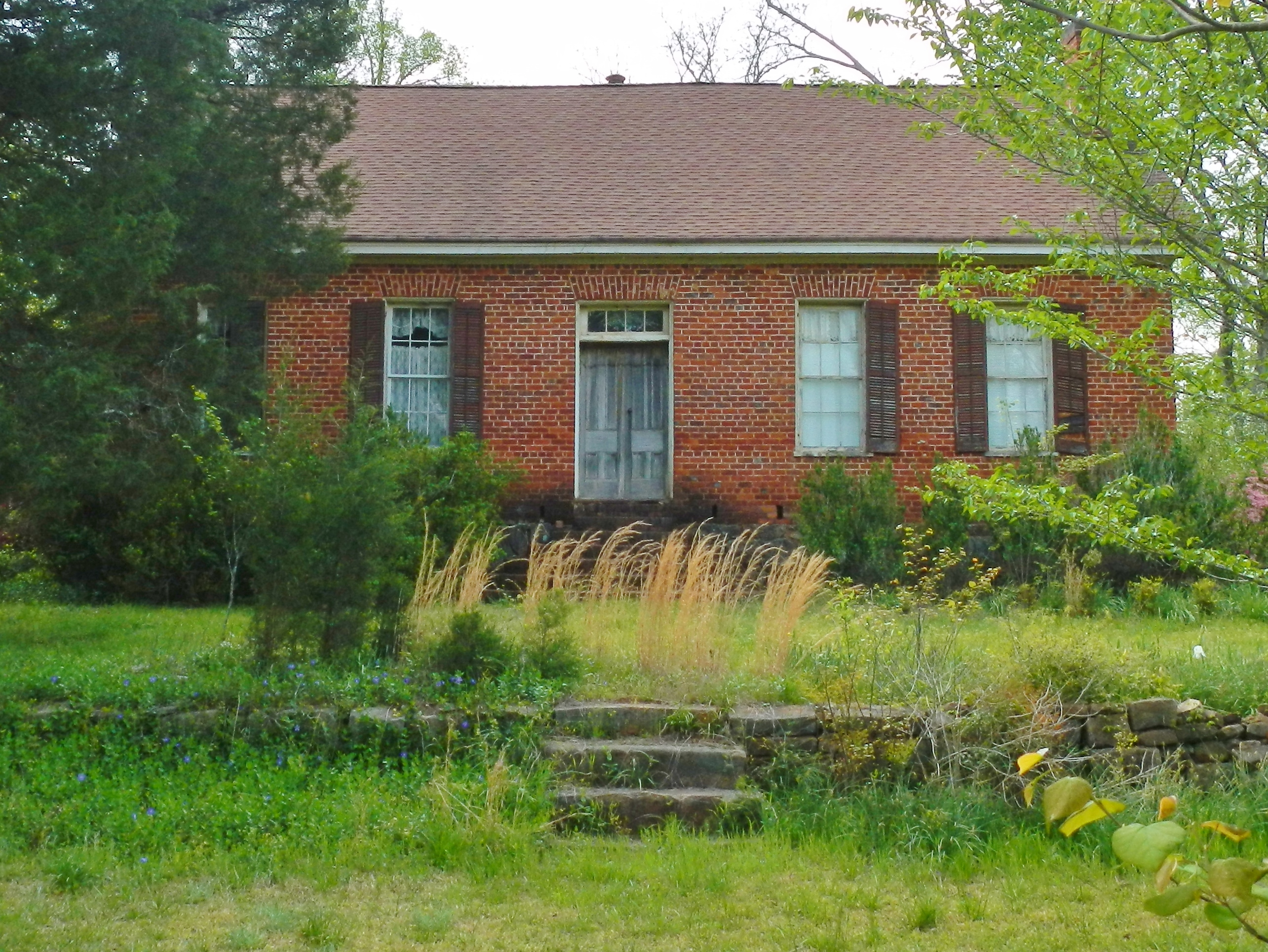
The Harman-Watson-Matthews House was added to the National Register of Historic Places on May 9, 1973.

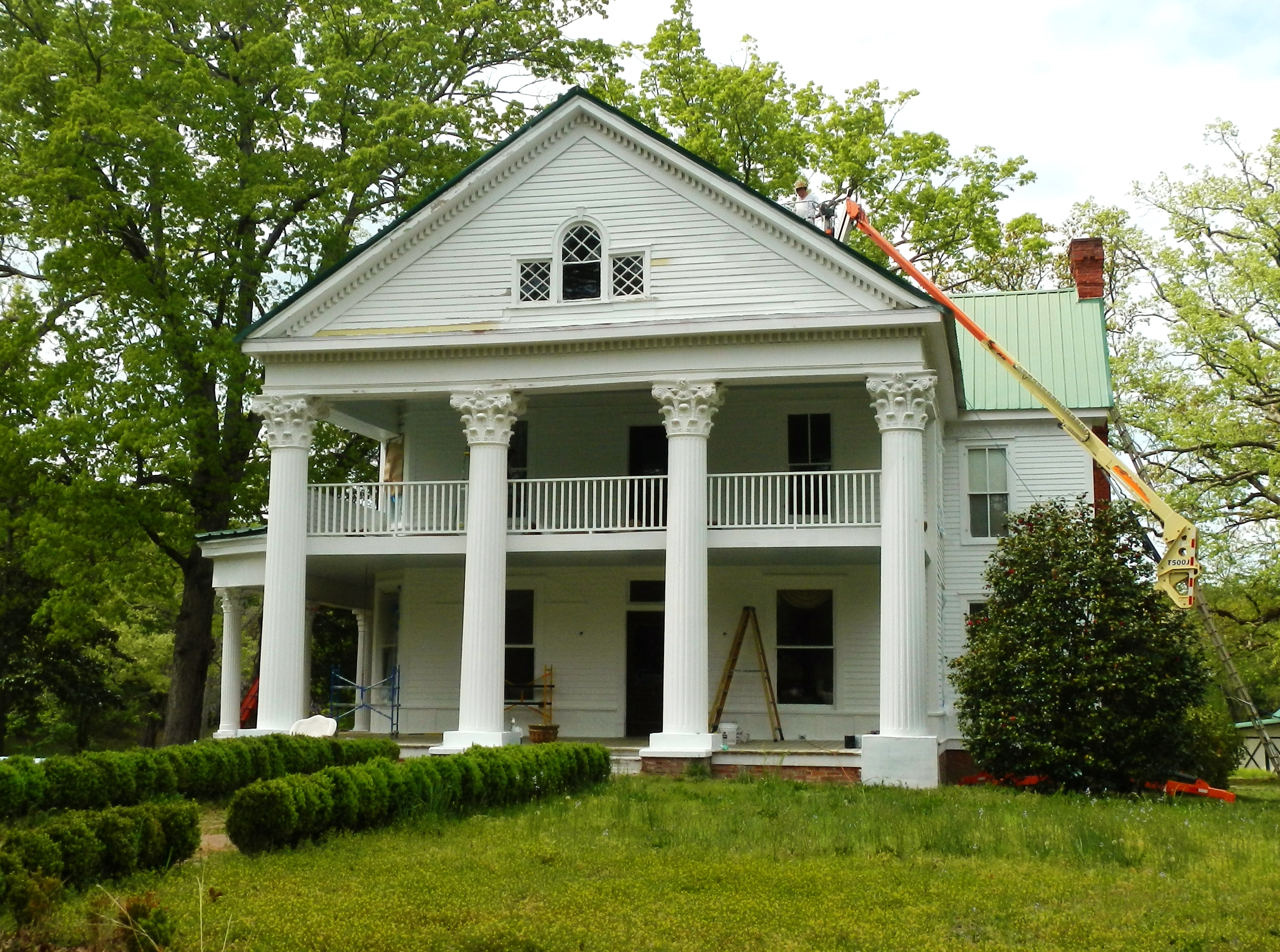
The Burwell O. Hill House was added to the National Register of Historic Places on June 17, 1982.

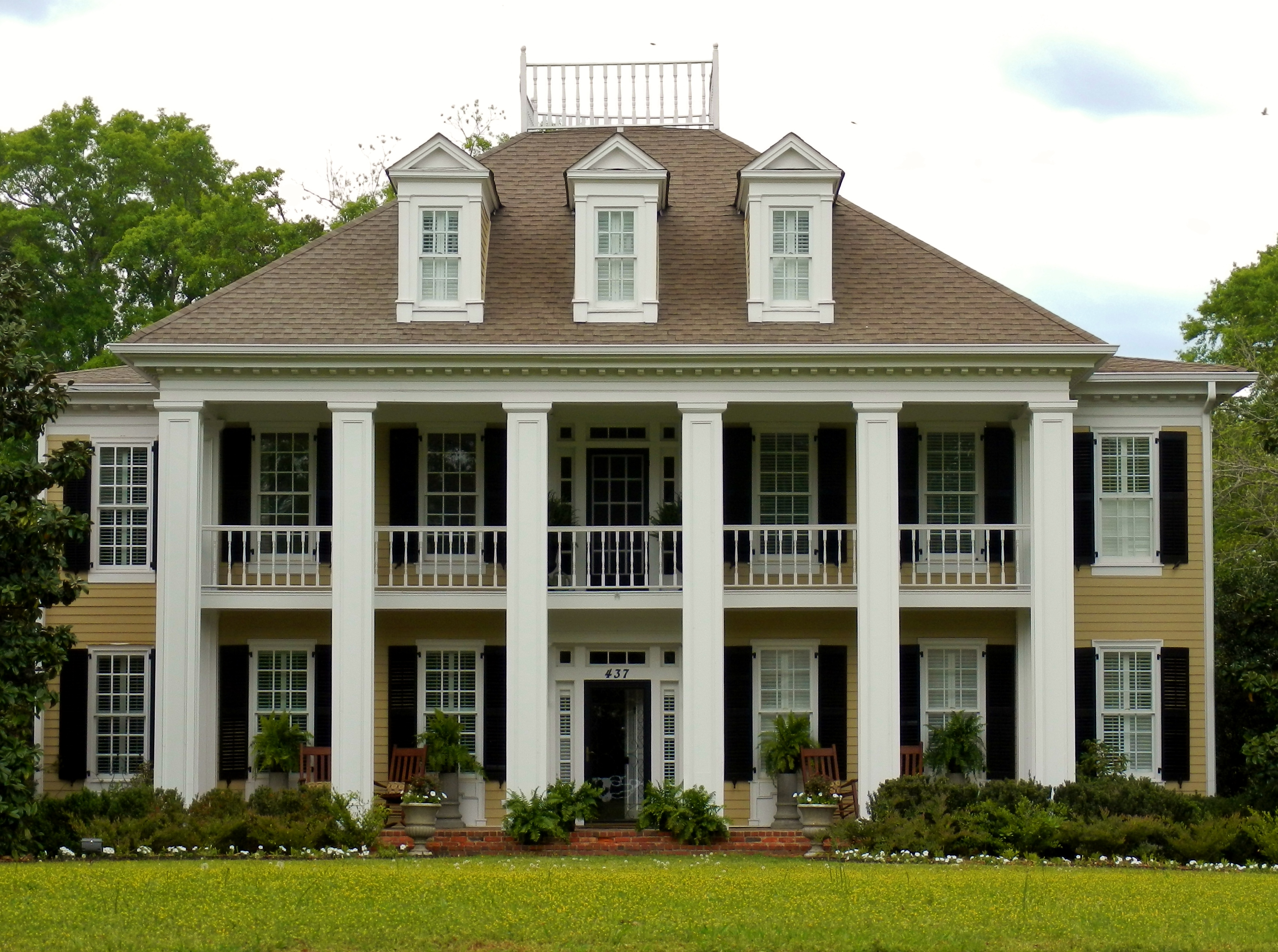
The Hiram Warner Hill House was added to the National Register of Historic Places on April 7, 1983.

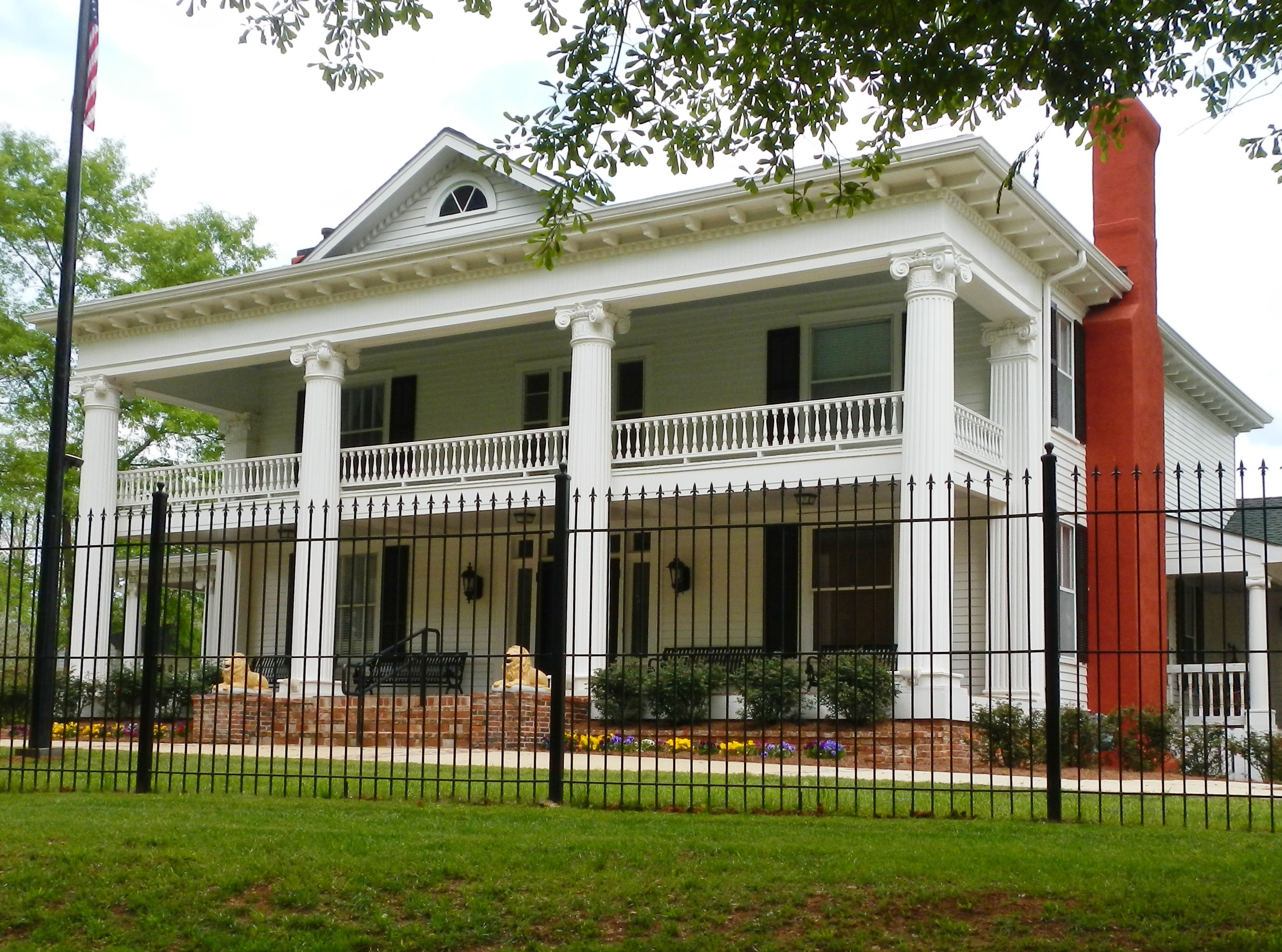
The Render Family Homestead was added to the National Register of Historic Places on March 1, 1984.

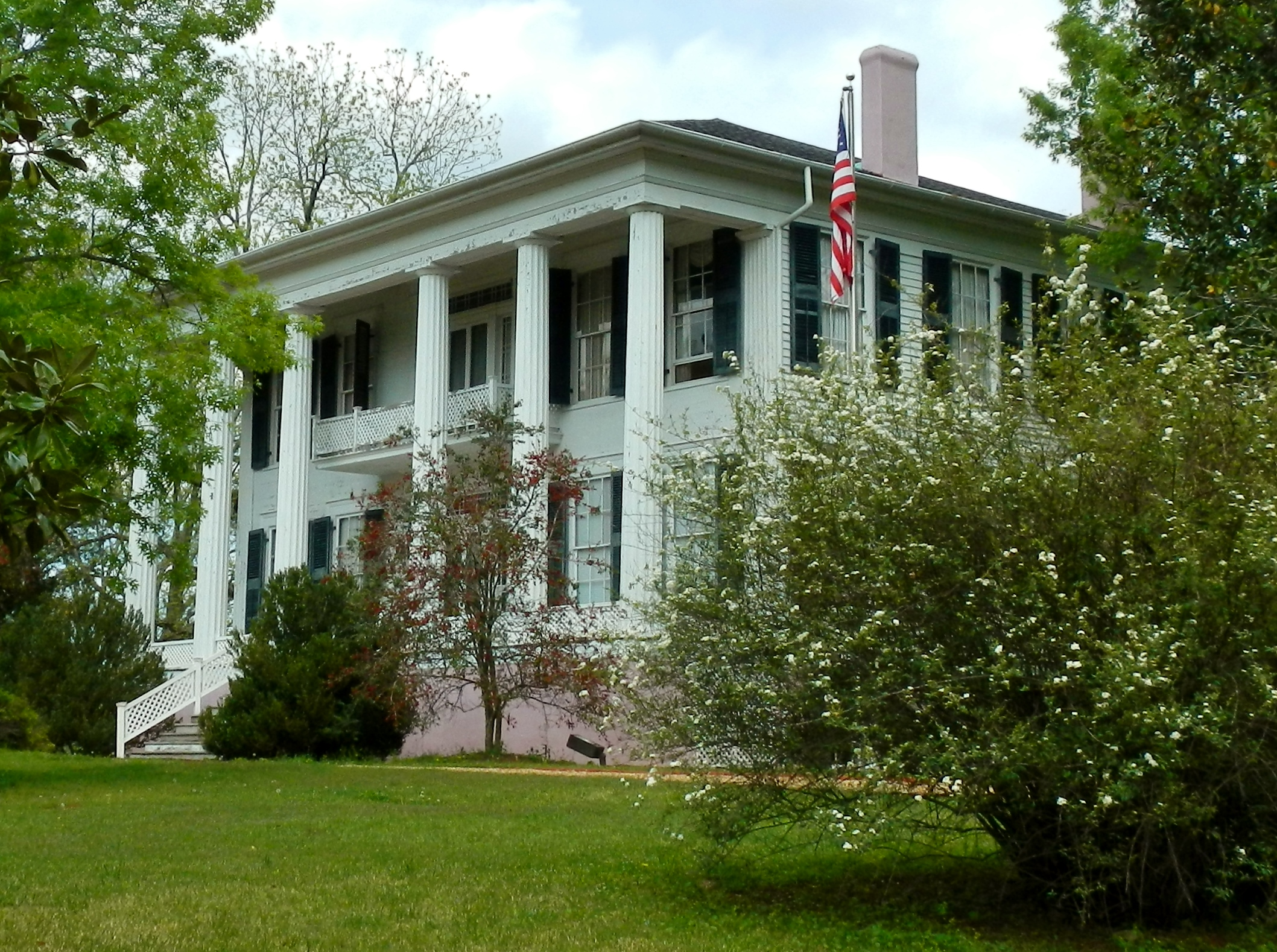
Twin Oaks, also known as Winsor Hall, was added to the National Register of Historic Places on August 26, 1980.
