= List of Rosenwald schools =

This is a list of some of the 5,000 Rosenwald Schools built across the South from Texas to Virginia and from Florida to Oklahoma. There once were 5,000 or so Rosenwald Schools in the United States, primarily serving Black Americans. At least 58 of these schools are listed on the U.S. National Register of Historic Places. Notable examples listed by state include:

== Alabama ==
Name	Image	Dates	Location	City, State	Description
Bibb County Training School		1900 built 1975 ARLH-listed		Centreville, Alabama	Formerly Centreville Industrial School
Chilton County Training School		1924 built 2007 ARLH-listed		Clanton, Alabama	
Emory School		1915 built 1998 NRHP-listed		Hale County, Alabama	
Escambia County Training School		1920 built 2016 ARLH-listed		Atmore, Alabama	
Merritt Rosenwald School		1922 built 1998 NRHP-listed		Midway, Alabama	
Mobile County Training School		1880 built	800 Whitley St. 30°44′20″N 88°3′25″W	Mobile, Alabama	MCTS is one of the last remaining active Rosenwald Schools. 1912, received Rosenwald Fund
Mount Sinai School		1919 built 2001 NRHP-listed; 2001 ARLH-listed	1820 County Road 57	Autauga County, Alabama	
New Hope Rosenwald School		1915 built 2001 NRHP-listed	32°56′36″N 85°17′8″W	Fredonia, Alabama	
Oak Grove School		1925 built 1998 NRHP-listed	32°32′48″N 87°40′48″W	Near Prairieville, Alabama	
Pickensville Rosenwald School		c. 1925 built 2010 ARLH-listed	254 Jim Locke Road	Pickensville, Alabama	
Shiloh Missionary Baptist Church and Rosenwald School		c. 1922; 2010 NRHP-listed; 2006 ARLH-listed	near 7794 Highway 81	Notasulga, Alabama	
Tankersley Rosenwald School		1922 built 2009 NRHP-listed		Hope Hull, Alabama	

== Arkansas ==
Name	Image	Dates	Location	City, State	Description
Bigelow Rosenwald School		1926 built 2004 NRHP-listed	Jct. of AR 60 and Bethel AME Rd. 35°4′30″N 92°33′55″W	Toad Suck, Arkansas	
Dallas County Training School High School Building		1931 built 2004 NRHP-listed	934 Center Street	Fordyce, Arkansas	
Malvern Rosenwald School		1929 built 2005 NRHP-listed	836 Acme Street; 34°21′45″N 92°49′18″W	Malvern, Arkansas	
Mt. Olive Rosenwald School		1927 built 2004 NRHP-listed	Bradley Rd. 45; 33°25′41″N 92°3′33″W	Mount Olive, Bradley County, Arkansas	Includes Colonial Revival architecture
Oak Grove Rosenwald School		1926 built 2004 NRHP-listed	Oak Grove Rd	Oak Grove, Arkansas	
Osceola Rosenwald School		1929 built	522 Childress St	Osceola, Arkansas	
Rosenwald School		1938 built 1990 NRHP-listed	34°2′13″N 93°27′17″W	near Delight, Arkansas	
Selma Rosenwald School		1924 built 2006 NRHP-listed	Selma-Collins Rd.	Selma, Arkansas	

== Florida ==
Name	Image	Dates	Location	City, State	Description
Booker Grammar School		1825 built	Lemon Avenue and 7th Street	Sarasota, Florida	formerly known as Sarasota Grammar School, and later moved to Emma E. Booker Elementary School
Cocoa Junior High School		1824 built 2019 NRHP-listed	307 Blake Avenue	Cocoa, Florida	
DeLeon Springs Colored School		1929 built 2003 NRHP-listed	330 East Retta Street	DeLeon Springs, Florida	
Dunbar School				Quincy, Florida	became William Stevens School and expanded to include William Stevens High School
Milner-Rosenwald Academy		1926 built 2009 Florida Historic Marker	1560 Highland Street	Mount Dora, Florida	
Okahumpka Rosenwald School		1929 built 2022 NRHP-listed	27908 Virgil Hawkins Circle	Okahumpka, Florida	
Orange City Colored School		1925 built 2003 NRHP-listed	200 E. Blue Springs Avenue	Orange City, Florida	
Pompano Colored School		1928 built	718 NW Sixth Street	Pompano Beach, Florida	demolished in 1972 and the site is now Coleman Park
Salem School				Gadsden County, Florida	
Sarasota Grammar School				Quincy, Florida	
The Rosenwald School			624 Bay Street (now Avenue)	Panama City, Florida	Building stands but is not in use as a school. No relation to current Rosenwald High School in Panama City.

== Georgia (U.S. state) ==
Name	Image	Dates	Location	City, State	Description
Beulah Rucker House-School		1915 built 1995 NRHP-listed		Gainesville, Georgia	
Cusseta Industrial High School		2011 NRHP-listed	113 Sandy Road	Cusseta, Georgia	
Dewberry School				Rossville, Georgia	
Eleanor Roosevelt School		1936 built 2010 NRHP-listed	350 Parham Street	Warm Springs, Georgia	also known as the Eleanor Roosevelt Vocational School for Colored Youth, and Warm Springs Negro School
Fort Valley High and Industrial School				Fort Valley, Georgia	Large campus with multiple buildings
Hamilton High School		1924 built		Scottdale, Georgia	Formerly Avondale Colored School, and Avondale Elementary and High School
Hiram Colored School		1930 built 2001 NRHP-listed		Hiram, Georgia	
Thomas Jefferson Elder High and Industrial School		1927–1928 built 1981 NRHP-listed	316 Hall Street	Sandersville, Georgia	

== Kentucky ==
Name	Image	Dates	Location	City, State	Description
Cadentown School		c. 1879 built 1917 Rosenwald Fund	705 Caden Lane	Lexington, Kentucky	
Cedar Grove Rosenwald School		1928 built 2002 NRHP-listed		Olmstead, Kentucky	
Douglass School		1929 built	465 Price Road	Lexington, Kentucky	
Mays Lick Negro School		1921 built 2018 NRHP-listed	5003 Raymond Road	Mays Lick, Kentucky	
Rosenwald School		1926 built 1963 closed		Fulton, Kentucky	
Union Station School (Paducah, Kentucky)		1928 built 2011 NRHP-listed	3138 Roosevelt Drive (also known as 3138 Flagman St.)	Paducah, Kentucky	

== Louisiana ==
Name	Image	Dates	Location	City, State	Description
Community Rosenwald School		1928–1929 built 2009 NRHP-listed	460 State Rte 3015	Grand Cane, Louisiana	NRHP-listed
Beauregard Parish Training School		1911 founded 1929 built (2nd building); 1996 NRHP-listed		DeRidder, Louisiana	
Logansport Rosenwald High School				Logansport, Louisiana	
Longstreet Rosenwald School		1924 built 2009 NRHP-listed		Longstreet, Louisiana	NRHP-listed
McHenry School				Ouachita Parish, Louisiana	
Plaisance Rosenwald School		1921 built 2004 NRHP-listed	3264 LA 167	Plaisance, Louisiana	NRHP-listed
Rosenwald High School		1922 built		New Roads, Louisiana	formerly New Roads High School
Tensas Rosenwald High School		1926 built		St. Joseph, Louisiana	

== Maryland ==
Name	Image	Dates	Location	City, State	Description
Camp Parole Rosenwald School		c. 1923 built	6 Dorsey Ave.	Annapolis, Maryland	
Freetown Rosenwald School		1924 built 2007 NRHP-listed	7825 Freetown Road; 39°8′27″N 76°34′38″W	Glen Burnie, Maryland	
Galesville Rosenwald School		1929 built	916 West Benning Rd.	Galesville, Maryland	
Highland Park School				Prince George's County, Maryland	had been in continuous use by the school system, and was renovated for a Headstart Center.
Lula G. Scott Community Center		1921 built 2009 NRHP-listed	6243 Shady Side Rd. 39°50′8.07″N 76°30′48.81″W	Shady Side, Maryland	Also known as the Churchton Rosenwald School
Marley Neck Rosenwald School		1927 built 2005 NRHP–listed	7780 Solley Road	Anne Arundel County, Maryland	
Mills Swamp School			374 Mill Swamp Road	Edgewater, Maryland	Also known as Ralph Bunche School, named for Ralph Bunche; now the Ralph J. Bunche Community Center
Norbeck School		1927 built		Montgomery County, Maryland	Locally designated historic site on Montgomery County's Master Plan for Historic Preservation
Perryman Rosenwald School			116 Spesutia Road	Aberdeen, Maryland	Now the Refuge Temple Church
Pumphrey Elementary School		1923 built	6024 Belle Grove Road (Maryland Route 170)	Brooklyn Park, Maryland	
Queenstown Rosenwald School		1932 built 2009 NRHP-listed	430 Queenstown Rd. 39°8′41.65″N 76°39′8.5″W	Severn, Maryland	
Ridgeley School		1927 built	8507 Central Avenue	Capitol Heights, Maryland	officially Colored School No. 1 of Prince George's County, now a museum.
San Domingo School		1919 built 2007 NRHP-listed	11526 Old School Rd. 38°30′39″N 75°43′22″W	Sharptown, Maryland	Also known as the Sharptown Colored School and Prince Hall Masons Unity Lodge No. 73 and now the San Domingo Community and Cultural Center.
Smithville Colored School		1927 built	811 East Randolph Rd. 39°4′31.56″N 76°59′42.36″W	Colesville, Maryland	

== Mississippi ==
Name	Image	Dates	Location	City, State	Description
George Washington Carver High School		1919 built		Picayune, Mississippi	Formerly Pearl River County Training School
Henderson High School		1927 built	200 Dr. Martin Luther King Jr Drive W	Starkville, Mississippi	Formerly Oktibbeha County Training School
J.W. Randolph School		1928 built 2006 MS Landmark	315 Clark Avenue	Pass Christian, Mississippi	Since 2000, the building was no longer used as a school
Little Red Schoolhouse		1928 built		Drew, Mississippi	
Sherman Line Rosenwald School		1928 built 2017 NRHP-listed	3021 Sherman Church Road	Magnolia, Mississippi	

== Missouri ==
Name	Image	Dates	Location	City, State	Description
Lincoln School		1930 built	815 N. Sherman Ave.	Springfield, Missouri	Currently Ozarks Technical Community College

== North Carolina ==
Name	Image	Dates	Location	City, State	Description
Atkins High School		1931 built 1999 NRHP-listed	1215 N. Cameron Ave. 36°06′39″N 80°13′17″W	Winston-Salem, North Carolina	
Billingsville School		1927 built 1999 NRHP-listed	3100 Leroy St. 35°11′46″N 80°48′30″W	Charlotte, North Carolina	
Caswell County Training School		1924 built 2017 NRHP-listed	403 Dillard School Dr.	Yanceyville, North Carolina	
Central School		1926 built 1993 NRHP-listed	414 Watkins St. 35°42′38″N 79°48′14″W	Asheboro, North Carolina	
Coinjock Colored School		1920 built 2013 NRHP-listed	4358 Caratoke Hwy. 36°21′46″N 78°36′04″W	Coinjock, North Carolina	
Concord School		1922 built 2018 NRHP-listed	645 Walter Grissom Rd. 36°9′47″N 78°22′47″W	near Kittrell, North Carolina	
Harnett County Training School		1922 built 1956 closed 2014 NRHP-listed	610 E. Johnson St. 35°18′40″N 78°36′02″W	Dunn, North Carolina	
J.C. Price High School		1931–1932 built 2010 NRHP-listed	1300-1400 W. Bank St. 35°40′37″N 80°29′07″W	Salisbury, North Carolina	
Liberia School		1921–1922 built 2005 NRHP-listed	4.5 miles S of Warrenton, Sw side of NC 58; 36°21′42″N 78°06′03″W	Warrenton, North Carolina	
Liberty Hill School (Ellerbe, North Carolina)		1930 built 2008 NRHP-listed	234 Covington Comm. Rd. 35°08′15″N 79°52′00″W	near Ellerbe, North Carolina	
Lincoln Park School		1922 built 1997 NRHP-listed	1272 S. Currant St. 35°5′6″N 78°28′25″W	Pinebluff, North Carolina	
Morgan School		1925–1926 built 2006 NRHP-listed	7427 Winters Rd. 35°49′18″N 78°8′14″W	Bailey, North Carolina	
Orange County Training School		1924 built	350 Caldwell Street	Chapel Hill, North Carolina	later known as Lincoln High School (1948–1966)
Panther Branch School		1926 built 2001 NRHP-listed	NC 2727, 0.5 miles (0.80 km) south of NC 183; 35°37′59″N 78°38′28″W	near Raleigh, North Carolina	
Princeton Graded School		1925–1926 built 2005 NRHP-listed	601-611 W. Edwards St. 35°28′11″N 78°10′07″W	Princeton, North Carolina	
Reid's Grove School		1927 built 2011 NRHP-listed	931 Main St. 36°25′04″N 78°45′29″W	near Gatesville, North Carolina	
Riley Hill School		1928 built 2001 NRHP-listed	NC 2320, 0.2 miles (0.32 km) east of NC 2318; 35°51′34″N 78°24′59″W	Wendell, North Carolina	
Russell School (Durham, North Carolina)		1926–1927 built 2009 NRHP-listed	2001 St. Mary's Rd. 36°7′24″N 78°56′45″W	near Durham, North Carolina	
Siloam School		1920 built 2007 NRHP-listed	W side of Mallard Highlands Dr, Approx. 0.25 mi. S from jct. of John Adams Rd., 35°20′10″N 80°44′20″W	Charlotte, North Carolina	
Snow Hill Colored High School		1925 built 2003 NRHP-listed	602A W. Harper St. 35°26′58″N 77°20′52″W	Snow Hill, North Carolina	also known as Greene County Colored Training School and Rosenwald Center for Cultural Enrichment
St. Matthews School		1922 built 2001 NRHP-listed	US 401, 0.5 miles (0.80 km) northeast of NC 2213; 35°51′37″N 78°33′41″W	near Raleigh, North Carolina	
Sunshine School			202 Hairston Street	Eden, North Carolina	
Walnut Cove Colored School		1921 built 1995 NRHP-listed	Jct. of Brook and Dalton Sts., NW corner 36°18′12″N 80°08′39″W	Walnut Cove, North Carolina	won an award for its rehabilitation for use as a senior citizens' community center
Ware Creek School		1921 built 1996 NRHP-listed	East side of NC 1103, .3 miles southeast of junction with NC 1112; 35°25′12″N 76°56′19″W	Blounts Creek, North Carolina	
Warren County Training School		1931 built 2006 NRHP-listed	East side of NC 1300, 0.8 N of NC 1372; 36°30′56″N 78°09′59″W	Wise, North Carolina	
W. E. B. DuBois School		1926 built 1993 NRHP-listed	536 Franklin St. 35°59′06″N 78°30′04″W	Wake Forest, North Carolina	
Williamston Colored School		1930–1931 built 2014 NRHP-listed	705 Washington St. 35°50′45″N 77°03′38″W	Williamston, North Carolina	
Zachariah School		1920 built 2005 NRHP-listed	NC 1239, 0.6 miles South of NC 1244; 35°31′28″N 77°41′53″W	Greene County, North Carolina	

== Oklahoma ==
Name	Image	Dates	Location	City, State	Description
Arbeka Rosenwald School		1929 built		Arbeka, Oklahoma	Also known as "Arbeka U.G. School #1"
Douglass School		1907 built 2008 NRHP-listed; 2011 closed		Lawton, Oklahoma	Also known as "Fredrick Douglass School"
Kiowa County Sep. #1				Hobart, Oklahoma	
Lincoln Grade School				Lehigh, Oklahoma	
Pleasant Hill School				McCurtain County, Oklahoma	
Lima Rosenwald School		1921 built 1966 closed 1984 NRHP-listed	College Street	Lima, Oklahoma	
Union School				Stella, Oklahoma	

== South Carolina ==
Name	Image	Dates	Location	City, State	Description
Carroll Rosenwald School		1929 built 2018 NRHP-listed		Rock Hill, South Carolina	NRHP-listed
Catawba Rosenwald School		1924-25 built 2013 NRHP-listed	3071 South Anderson Road	Catawba, South Carolina	NRHP-listed
Great Branch Teacherage		1924–1925 built 2007 NRHP-listed		Orangeburg, South Carolina	NRHP-listed
Hannah Rosenwald School		1924 built 2009 NRHP-listed	2890 Neeses Highway	Newberry, South Carolina	NRHP-listed
Hope Rosenwald School		1925–1926 built 2007 NRHP-listed	1971 Hope Station Rd. 34°16′14″N 81°21′52″W	Near Pomaria, South Carolina	Has Colonial Revival architecture. Will be used as a community center
Hopewell Rosenwald School		1926 built 2010 NRHP-listed		Near Clarks Hill, South Carolina	
Howard Junior High School		1925 built 2006 NRHP-listed	431 Shiloh St.	Prosperity, South Carolina	
Mt. Zion Rosenwald School		1925 built 2001 NRHP-listed		Near Florence, South Carolina	
Pine Grove Rosenwald School		1923 built 2009 NRHP-listed	937 Piney Woods Rd.	Columbia, South Carolina	
Retreat Rosenwald School		1923 built 2011 NRHP-listed		Westminster, South Carolina	NRHP-listed

== Tennessee ==
Name	Image	Dates	Location	City, State	Description
Allen-White School		1918 built 2010 NRHP-listed	100 Allen Extension Street	Whiteville, Tennessee	Destroyed by arson in 2012.
Bernard School		1922 built	Bernard Drive	McMinnville, Tennessee	Demolished in 1982.
Cairo Rosenwald School		1922 built 1996 NRHP-listed	Zieglers Fort Rd., approximately 2.5 mi. S of TN 25; 36°21′48″N 86°21′49″W	Cairo, Tennessee	
Douglass High School		1911 founded 1928 built	301 Louis Street	Kingsport, Tennessee	
Dunbar Public School		ca. 1923 built 2007 NRHP-listed	113 Steekee St.	Loudon, Tennessee	Now a community center
Durham's Chapel School		1923 built 2006 NRHP-listed	5055 Old TN 31E	Bethpage, Tennessee	
Free Hills Rosenwald School		1929 built 1996 NRHP-listed	Free Hills Road, E of TN 52; 36°33′49″N 85°29′23″W	Free Hill, Tennessee	Free Hills Community Center in Free Hill, Tennessee. Free Hill is also known as Free Hills.
Gibson County Training School		1926 built 2012 NRHP-listed	1041 Harris Street	Milan, Tennessee	
Lincoln School		1925 built 1993 NRHP-listed	Old TN 28 near Rockford Road	Pikeville, Tennessee	
Oak Grove School		1935 built 2018 NRHP-listed	410 Brantley Road	Sharps Chapel, Tennessee	
O.H. Bernard School		1930 built	113 Bernard Avenue	Centerville, Tennessee	Former site of the earlier Ali Vesta School, closed in 1969. Now the Bernard Community Center.
Pasquo School		1927 built	8534 Lewis Road	Nashville, Tennessee	As of 2018, a private residence
Warfield Rosenwald School		1922 built	5025 Guthrie Road	South Guthrie, Tennessee	Now used as a community center.

== Texas ==
Name	Image	Dates	Location	City, State	Description
Annie E. Colbert Rosenwald School		1927 built	231 S Colbert Street; 30°02′46″N 94°52′45″W	Dayton, Texas	
Hopewell School		1922 built 2015 NRHP-listed	690 State Highway 21 West; 30°05′55″N 97°27′40.5″W	Cedar Creek, Texas	
Lockhart Vocational High School		1923 built 1998 NRHP-listed	1104 E. Market St. 29°53′09″N 97°39′47″W	Lockhart, Texas	
Pleasant Hill School		1925 built 2004 NRHP-listed	2722 Farm Rd. 1399; 33°3′11″N 94°23′46″W	Linden, Texas	
Sam Houston Industrial and Training School		1907 built	30°41′55.44″N 95°37′44.1″W	Galilee, Texas	also known as Galilee Community School, and Houstonian Normal and Industrial Institute.
Sweet Home Vocational and Agricultural High School		1924 built 1998 NRHP-listed	10 mi (16 km). S of Seguin on Sweet Home Rd. 29°27′40″N 98°02′21″W	Seguin, Texas	

== Virginia ==
Name	Image	Dates	Location	City, State	Description
Buckingham Training School		1932 built	245 Camden Street	Dillwyn, Virginia	
Courtland School		c. 1928 built 2016 NRHP-listed	25499 Florence Street	Courtland, Virginia	
Dry Bridge School		1928 built 2009 NRHP-listed 2008 Virginia Landmarks Register-listed	1005 Jordan Street	Martinsville, Virginia	
East Suffolk Elementary School		1926–1927 built 2003 NRHP-listed	231 S. 7th St. 36°43′30″N 76°33′51″W	Suffolk, Virginia	
Fauquier Training School		1923 built 1938 burned down	2715 Dogtown Rd	Goochland, Virginia	Replaced by Central High School at 2748 Dogtown Rd.
First Union School (Crozier, Virginia)		1926 built 2009 NRHP-listed	1522 Old Mill Rd	Crozier, Virginia	
Greensville County Training School		1929 built 2005 VLR-listed; 2006 NRHP-listed	105 Ruffin Street	Emporia, Virginia	Formerly Greensville County Learning Center
Martinsville Training School		1871 built 1920 Rosenwald Fund		Martinsville, Virginia	The Ruffner Institute, later known as Martinsville High School
Nansemond County Training School		1924 built 2004 NRHP-listed	9307 Southwestern Blvd. 36°38′22″N 76°48′16″W	Suffolk, Virginia	
Newtown School		1921 built 1965 Closed Doors	1398 Diamond Lane, Elkton, VA	East Elkton, Virginia	Only current Rosenwald school building still standing
Salem School		1923–1924 built 1998 VLR-listed; 1998 NRHP-listed	Jct. of Rtes. 608 and 632	Red Oak, Virginia	
Scrabble School		1921–1922 built 2007 NRHP-listed	111 Scrabble Rd. 38°35′02″N 78°8′58″W	Castleton, Virginia	
Second Union School		1918 built 2006 NRHP-listed	2787 Hadensville Fife Rd. 37°45′52″N 78°3′10″W	Goochland, Virginia	
Shady Grove School		1925 built 2009 VLR-listed; 2009 NRHP-listed		Louisa County, Virginia	
St. John Rosenwald School		1920s built	1569 St. John Rd.	Albemarle County, Virginia	In 2023, now the St. John Family Life and Fitness Center, Gordonsville.
St. Paul's School		1917 built 2003 VLR-listed; 2004 NRHP-listed	Brunswick Drive at I-85	Meredithville, Virginia	
Switchback School		1924–1925 built 2013 VLR-listed; 2013 NRHP-listed	210 Pinehurst Heights Road	near Hot Springs, Virginia	Formerly Union Hurst School
Washington Graded School		1923–1924 built 2019 NRHP-listed	267 Piedmont Avenue; 38°42′47″N 78°9′53″W	Washington, Virginia	
Woodville School		1923 built 2003 VLR-listed; 2004 NRHP-listed	4310 George Washington Memorial Highway	Ordinary, Virginia	
