= Cedar Grove Rosenwald School =

- U.S. National Register of Historic Places
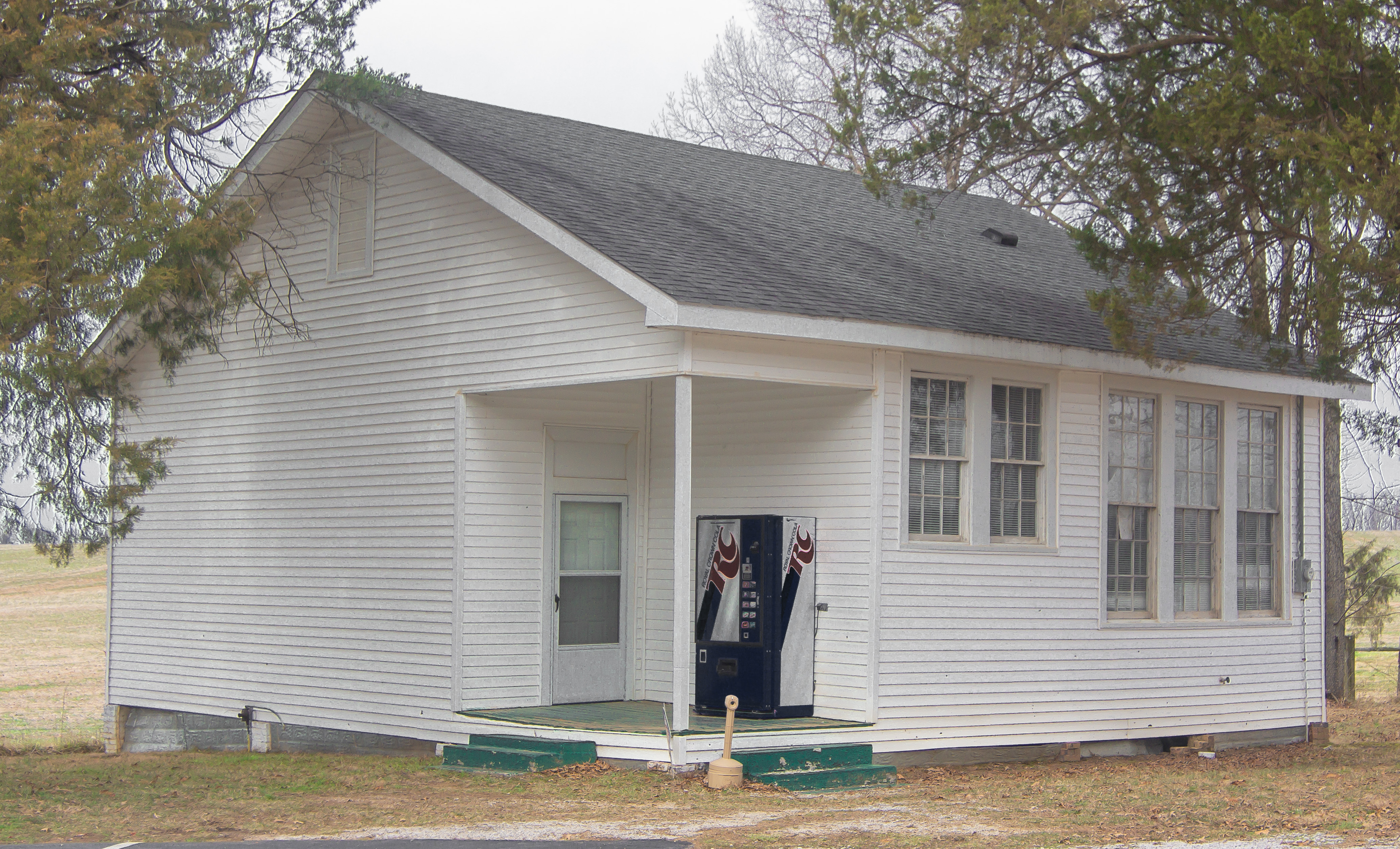

- Location within Kentucky Location within the United States
- Nearest city: Olmstead, Kentucky
- Coordinates: 36°44′16″N 86°58′26″W
- Area: less than one acre
- Built: 1928
- Built by: Walker, J.W.
- Architectural style: Bungalow/American Craftsman
- NRHP reference No.: 02000342
- Added to NRHP: April 11, 2002

The Cedar Grove Rosenwald School near Olmstead, Kentucky, is a Rosenwald School that was built in 1928. It includes Bungalow/craftsman architecture. It was listed on the National Register of Historic Places in 2002.

It is a one-story 30 feet (9.1 m) by 32 feet (9.8 m) balloon-framed building, funded by the Julius Rosenwald Fund. It served as a schoolhouse until 1946, when it was acquired by the Cedar Grove Missionary Baptist Church.
