= Pickensville Rosenwald School =

School in Pickens County, Alabama, US (c. 1925–1969)

- Interactive map of Pickensville Rosenwald School
- 33.240706°N 88.258305°W
- Location: 254 Jim Locke Road, Pickensville, Pickens County, Alabama, U.S.

History
- Dates active: c. 1925–c. 1969

Alabama Register of Landmarks and Heritage
- Designated: December 16, 2010

Pickensville Rosenwald School was a Rosenwald School primarily for the education of African-American students in Pickensville, Alabama, U.S.. It educated generations of children from c. 1925 until it closed c. 1969.

A historic marker for the school was erected by Alabama Historical Commission. It is listed by the Alabama Register of Landmarks and Heritage since December 16, 2010. The Historic Pickensville Rosenwald School Museum (also known as the Historic Rosenwald School and Museum) exists in Alabama since 2019.

== History ==
American educator, Booker T. Washington created the Rosenwald School system with funding from businessman Julius Rosenwald. The schools were created to promote collaboration between local black and white people. Pickensville Rosenwald School was one of six Rosenwald Schools built in Pickens County. The Pickensville Rosenwald School was opened in c. 1925 and served as a primary school, and was an important building in the rural community.

On April 27, 2011, a tornado damaged the building. Former alumnus Paulette Locke-Newberns led fundraising in 2013 to renovate the school building; and the University of West Alabama’s Center for Business and Economic Services, the Pickensville Community Center, and the Alabama Black Belt Heritage Area contributed to the project.

== See also ==
- List of Rosenwald schools
