= Milner-Rosenwald Academy =

Coordinates: 28°48.623′N 81°38.186′E

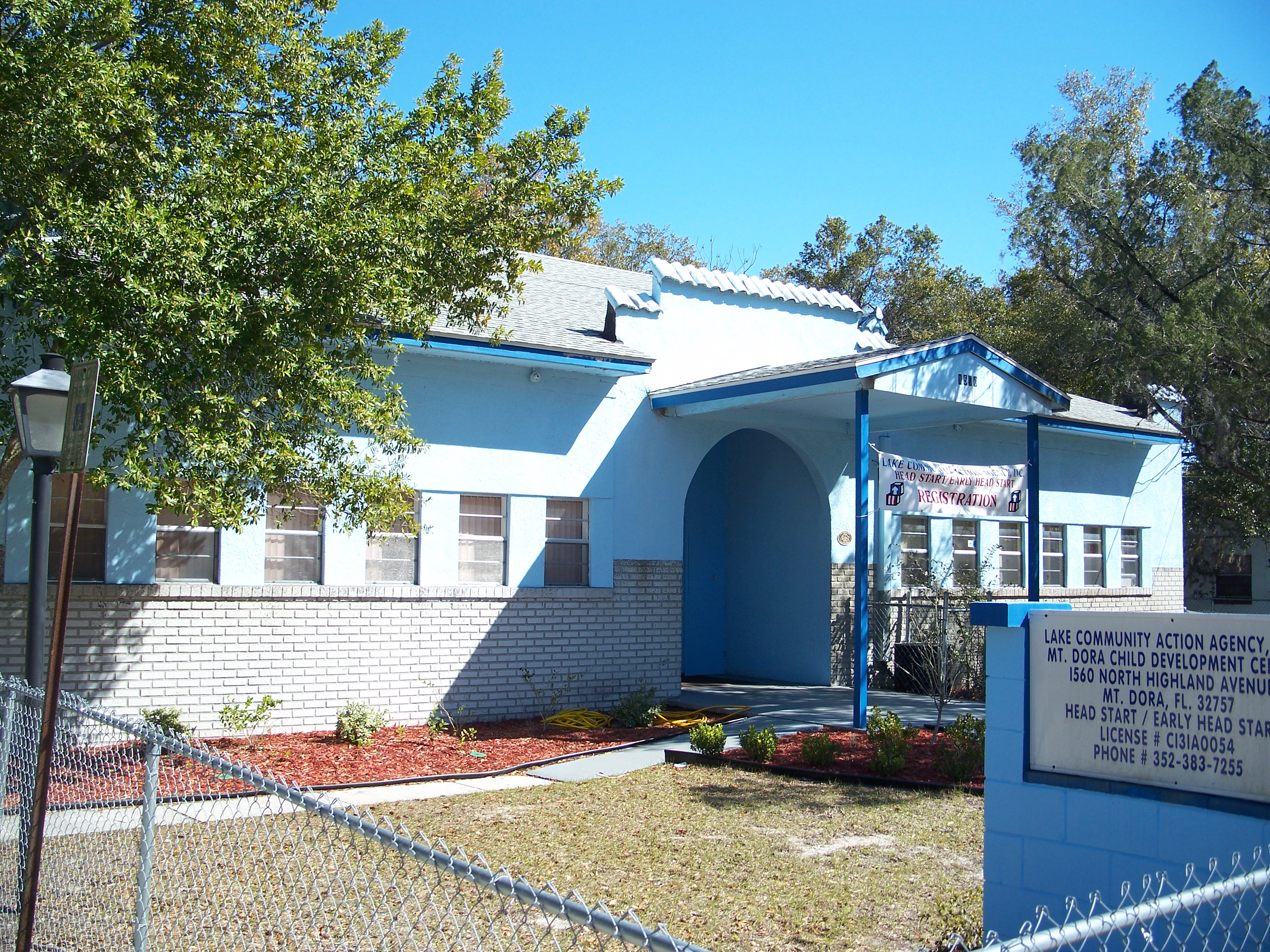

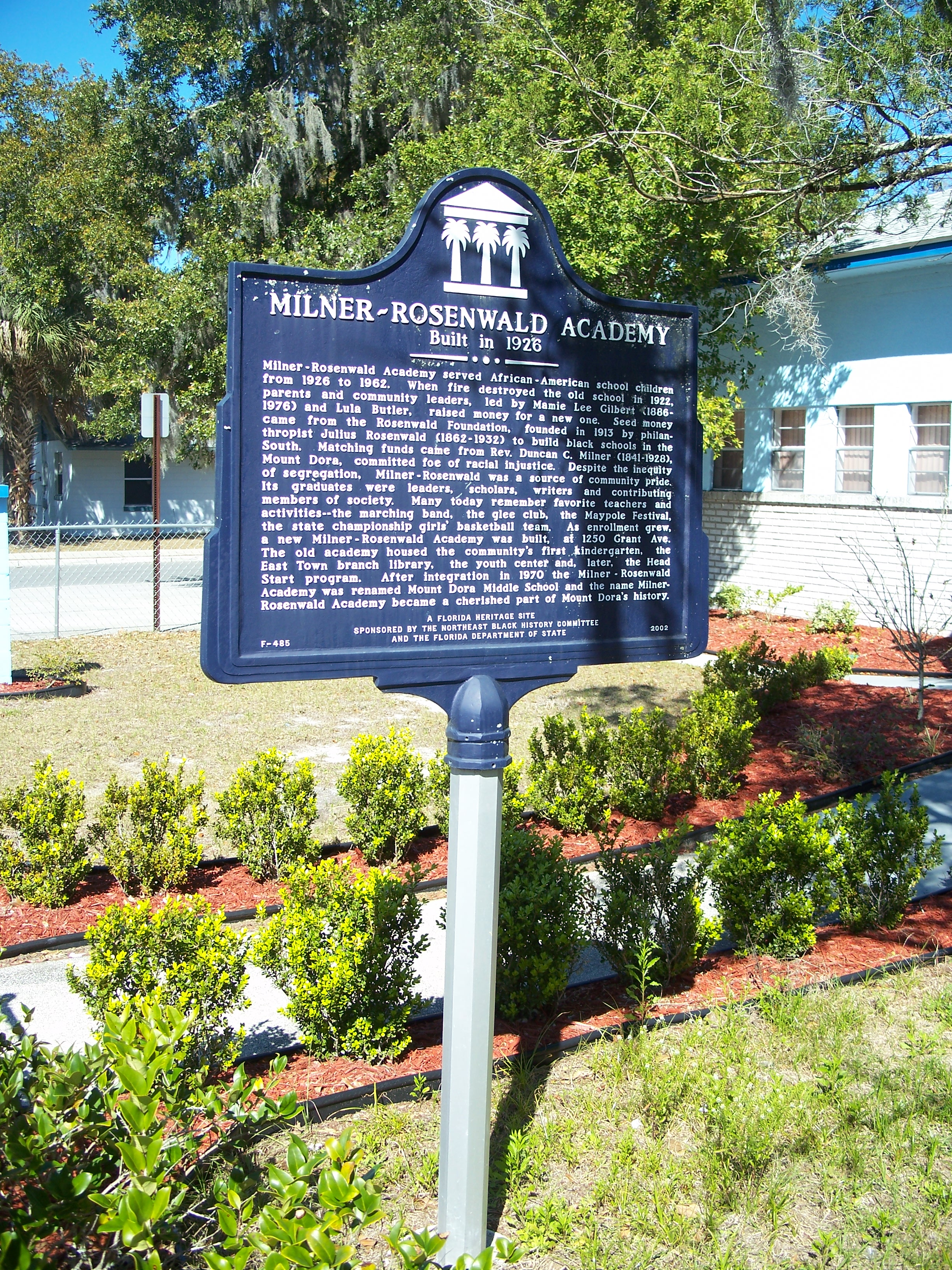
Historical marker by the school

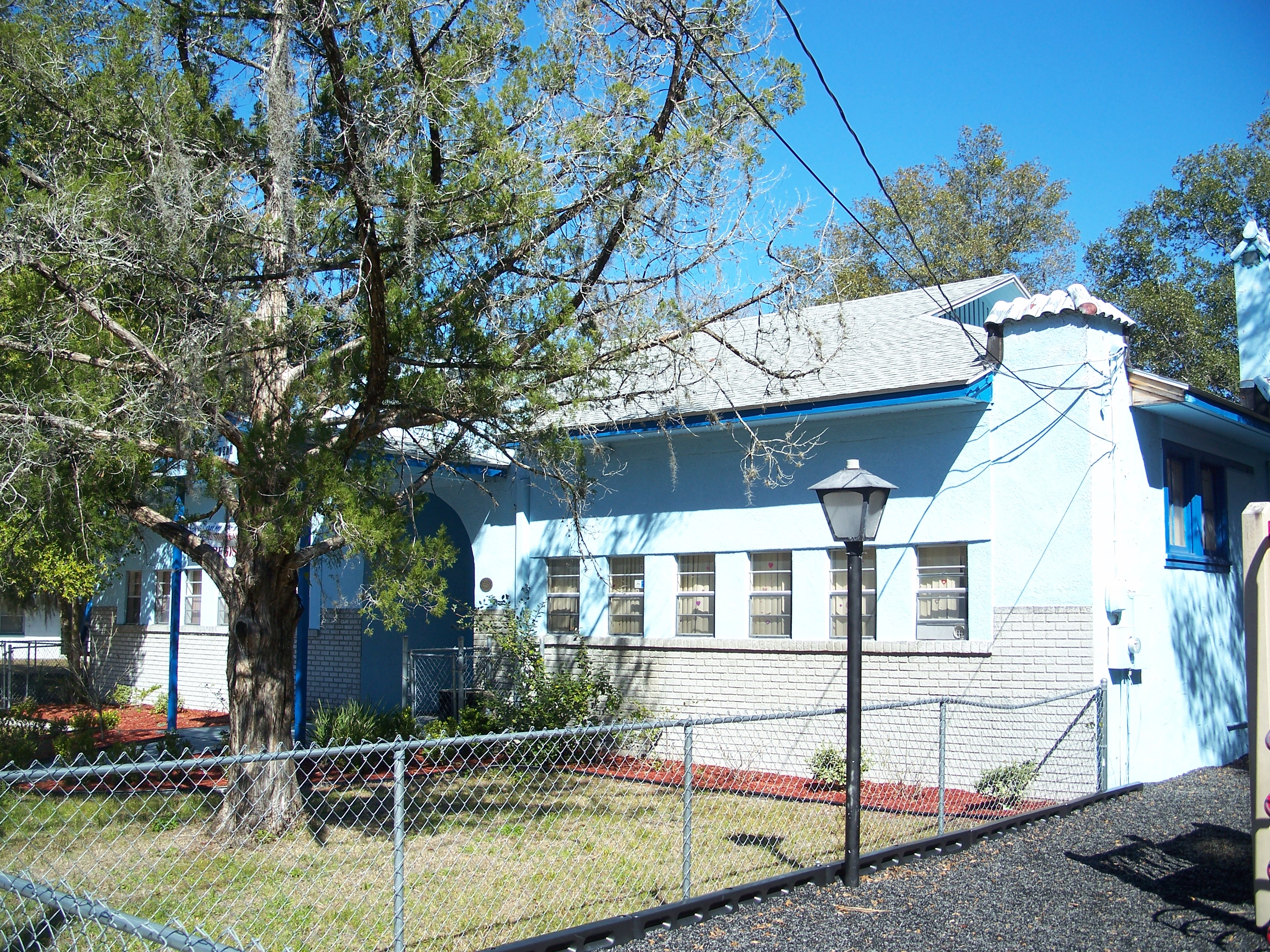
Side view

The Milner-Rosenwald Academy building is a former Rosenwald School, located at 1560 Highland Street, Mount Dora, Florida. It was opened in 1926, based on a design by architect Frank L. Bodine, and served students up to 8th grade. The school closed in 1962.

== History ==
The school was constructed on the site of an older one-room school for African Americans, which burnt down in 1922. The construction of the new school, which commenced in 1925, was funded by the Rosenwald Foundation, local caucasian resident, Reverend Duncan C. Milner, a civil war veteran, who fought at the Battle of Chickamauga and public school funds. The school catered for African Americans from kindergarten to 8th grade and was operated by the Mount Dora school board.

In 1955 a new Milner-Rosenwald school building was built nearby, at 1250 Grant Avenue, which catered for the lower grades, whilst the original school building catered for the upper grades (up to 8th grade). In 1962 the new school was expanded and all students were moved to the single campus. In 1972, following the end of racial segregation in the Florida education system, the new school was renamed Mount Dora Middle School. The original school building was used to house the community's first kindergarten, followed by a branch library, local youth center and is currently used by the Head Start program.

In 2004, the state awarded it a Florida Historic Marker. In 2009 the building failed to get recognized on the National Register of Historic Places due to early structural alterations to the original large windows.

== See also ==
- List of Rosenwald schools
