= Galesville Rosenwald School =

School in Galesville, Maryland (1929–1956)

The Galesville Rosenwald School (1929–1956) was a private elementary school for African-American students in Galesville, Maryland.

== History ==
The school opened in 1929 with one room, and expanded to two rooms in 1931. It was a Rosenwald school, whose design and construction was funded privately by the Rosenwald Fund.

It closed in 1956 as schools were racially integrated, and black students were then bussed to other schools. A community group set the building up as a community center. The building was restored with grant funding and is now the home of the Galesville Community Center, at 916 West Benning Road in Galesville.

== See also ==
- List of Rosenwald schools
