= Bernard School =

School in McMinnville, Tennessee, US (1922–1966)

Location
- Bernard Drive, McMinnville, Tennessee, U.S.
- 35.679251°N 85.765817°W

Information
- Other name: Bernard High School
- Established: 1922
- Closed: 1966

Bernard School was a Rosenwald school for Black students, active from 1922 until 1966 in McMinnville, Warren County, Tennessee. A historical marker commemorates the school's history. It was also known as the Bernard High School.

== History ==
Bernard School was built in 1922 with money from the Rosenwald Fund. It was named for Rosenwald agent for Tennessee O. (Ollie) H. Bernard. The land for the school was donated by local stonemason, Sam Leftwich. It was located on Bernard Drive, on the east side of McMinnville. A library was built in 1927, following a donation from W. H. Hagness.

In 1946, the school burned down. It was rebuilt a year later in 1947. A gymnasium and field house were added in 1954, at a cost of US$40,000.

It closed following school integration in 1965–1966 school year, and the building was used for administrative offices, and later used for Head Start. Demolished in 1982, the site was used for brush disposal.

== Legacy ==
The school gymnasium is the only surviving building, and since 2019 it has housed the Young Men United, a youth mentorship program. The Bernard School centennial and homecoming was celebrated in 2022.

The Magness Public Library in McMinnville held an exhibit “Building a Bright Future: Black Communities & Rosenwald Schools in Tennessee” (2025) on Rosenwald schools, and included the Bernard School.

The Black History Museum of Warren County has a collection of items from the Bernard School.

== Alumni ==
- Carl T. Rowan (1925–2000), journalist, author, and diplomat

== See also ==
- List of Rosenwald schools
