= W. E. B. DuBois School =

Historic school building in North Carolina, United States

- U.S. National Register of Historic Places
- Location within North Carolina Location within the United States
- Location: 536 Franklin St., Wake Forest, North Carolina
- Coordinates: 35°59′6″N 78°30′4″W
- Area: 4 acres (1.6 ha)
- Built: 1926, 1939, 1942
- Architect: Simpson, Frank B.
- Architectural style: Colonial Revival
- MPS: Wake County MPS
- NRHP reference No.: 93000998
- Added to NRHP: October 5, 1993

W. E. B. DuBois School, also known as Wake Forest Graded School (Colored), Wake Forest Colored High School, and Wake Forest-Rolesville Middle School, is a historic Rosenwald School building and school complex located at Wake Forest, Wake County, North Carolina. The elementary school was built in 1926, consists of a one-story, seven-bay, brick veneer, main block with a rear ell and Colonial Revival style design elements. It has a side-gable roof and front portico. The High School Building was built in 1939 with funds provided by the Public Works Administration. It is a one-story, rectangular brick block with a hipped roof and slightly projecting gabled portico. The Agriculture Building/Shop was brought to this site in 1942. It is a one-story, L-shaped brick building, with the addition built about 1952–1953.

Named for sociologist W. E. B. Du Bois, the building was listed on the National Register of Historic Places in 1993.
