= Norbeck School =

Former African American school

Norbeck School, also known as the Norbeck Recreation Center, was built in 1927 as a Rosenwald School for the African American community of Mt. Pleasant in Montgomery County, Maryland. The 2,107 square-foot, two-room school was built with assistance from the Rosenwald fund, established by philanthropist Julius Rosenwald.

After the integration of public schools, the school was converted into a recreation center, and the surrounding land was acquired for M-NCPPC's Norbeck-Muncaster Mill Neighborhood Park. Norbeck School is a historic site, designated on the Montgomery County Master Plan for Historic Preservation.
