= Cocoa Junior High School =

- U.S. National Register of Historic Places
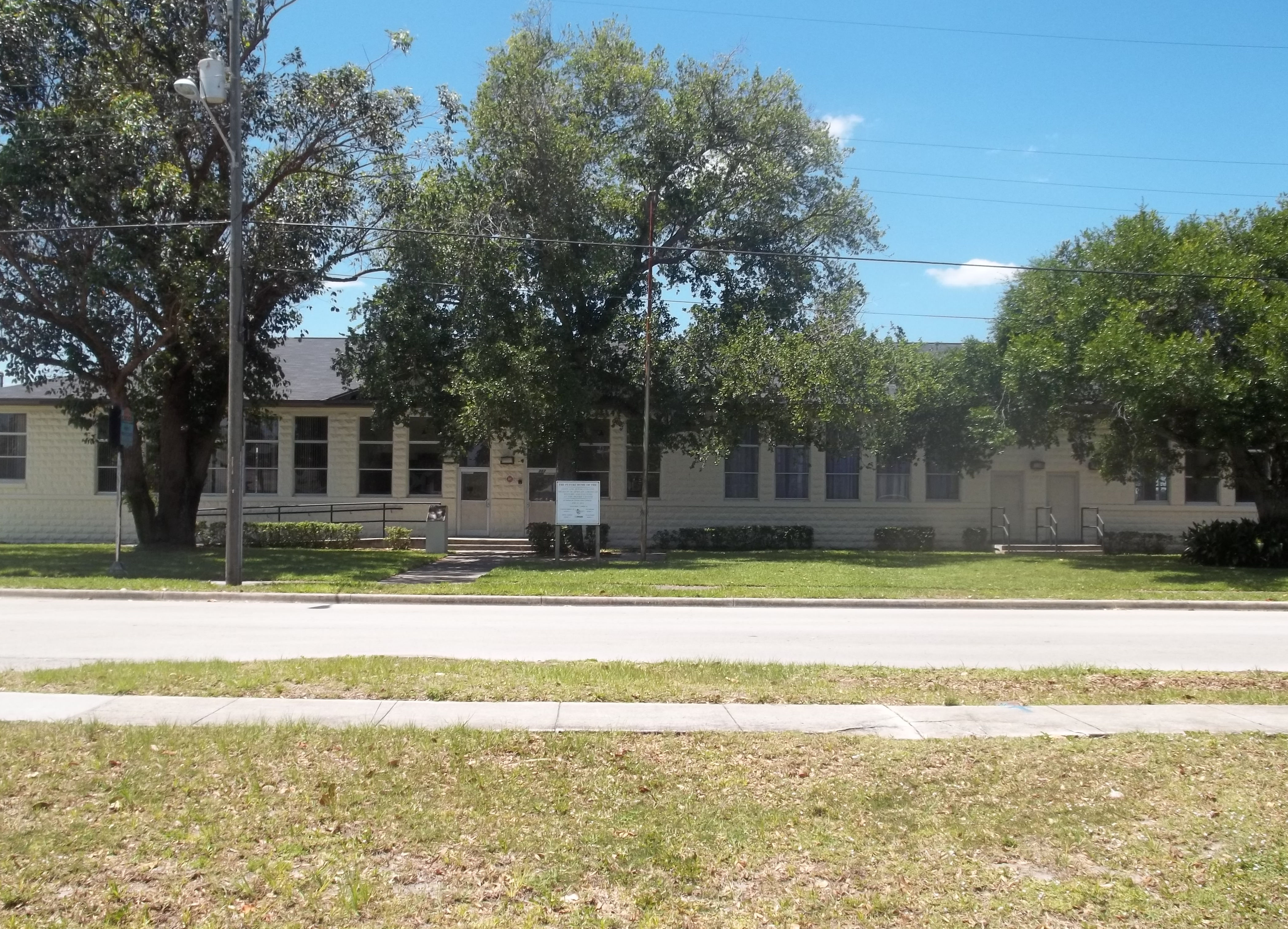
- The school building in 2019

- Location within Florida Location within the United States
- Location: 307 Blake Avenue, Cocoa, Florida
- Coordinates: 28°21′14.6″N 80°44′19.1″W
- Built: 1924, renovated 2019
- NRHP reference No.: 100003581
- Added to NRHP: April 3, 2019

Cocoa Junior High School is a historic school building in Cocoa, Florida (Brevard County). Built in 1923-24, it is one of the oldest remaining Rosenwald Schools in Florida. After the school closed in 1954, the building served as a community center and later as an African-American history museum. It houses the Leon and Jewel Collins Museum of African American History and Culture at the Harry T. Moore Center.

== History ==
Cocoa Junior High School was built between 1922 and 1924. Part of the funding for the school came from the Julius Rosenwald Fund and it served African American students. In 1938, teachers Harry T. Moore and John E. Gilbert sued the school district in order to receive equal pay for black teachers. Gilbert v. Board of Public Instruction of Brevard County reached the Florida Supreme Court, where the court ruled in favor of the district.

It became Monroe High School in 1947 when it began to serve grades 10-12. Following the 1954 Brown v. Board of Education decision which desegregated American public schools, the school was closed and pupils were sent to integrate local public schools.

The building was acquired by the City of Cocoa and turned into a community center. It was renamed the Harry T. Moore Center for Harry T. Moore, a local civil rights advocate. Moore and his wife had been assassinated three years earlier on Christmas Day 1951 and are believed to be the first civil rights activists to be assassinated during the movement.

In 2014 the building was renovated for use as an African American history museum. It is currently a site on Florida's Black Heritage Trail.

In 2019 Cocoa Junior High School was added to the National Register of Historic Places.
