= Okahumpka Rosenwald School =

School in Okahumpka, Florida, U.S.

Okahumpka Rosenwald School is a historic Rosenwald School building in rural Okahumpka, Florida, United States. It was built in 1929 and was used as a school for African American children in the community. It is one of the two remaining Rosenwald Schools in Lake County Florida.

The school was added to the National Register of Historic Places in 2022.

== History ==
Okahumpka Rosenwald School was built in 1929. It was one of the 120 Rosenwald schools built in Florida. The school replaced a one-room school house that was previously used for African American students in the area.

Construction costs for the new school were $3,320. The Julius Rosenwald Fund gave $500 towards the expense. The remaining funds were provided by the Black residents in the community and the Lake County School Board.

One room within the two-room schoolhouse was used to teach students in grades one though four. The second room was used for students in grades five through eight.

The school closed in 1964 after which it was used as a community center.

As of 2022, The Okahumpka Rosenwald School's building is one of 23 Rosenwald school buildings remaining in Florida.

A historical marker was installed at the school in 2021.

The school was added to the National Register of Historic Places on January 18, 2022.

== Preservation ==
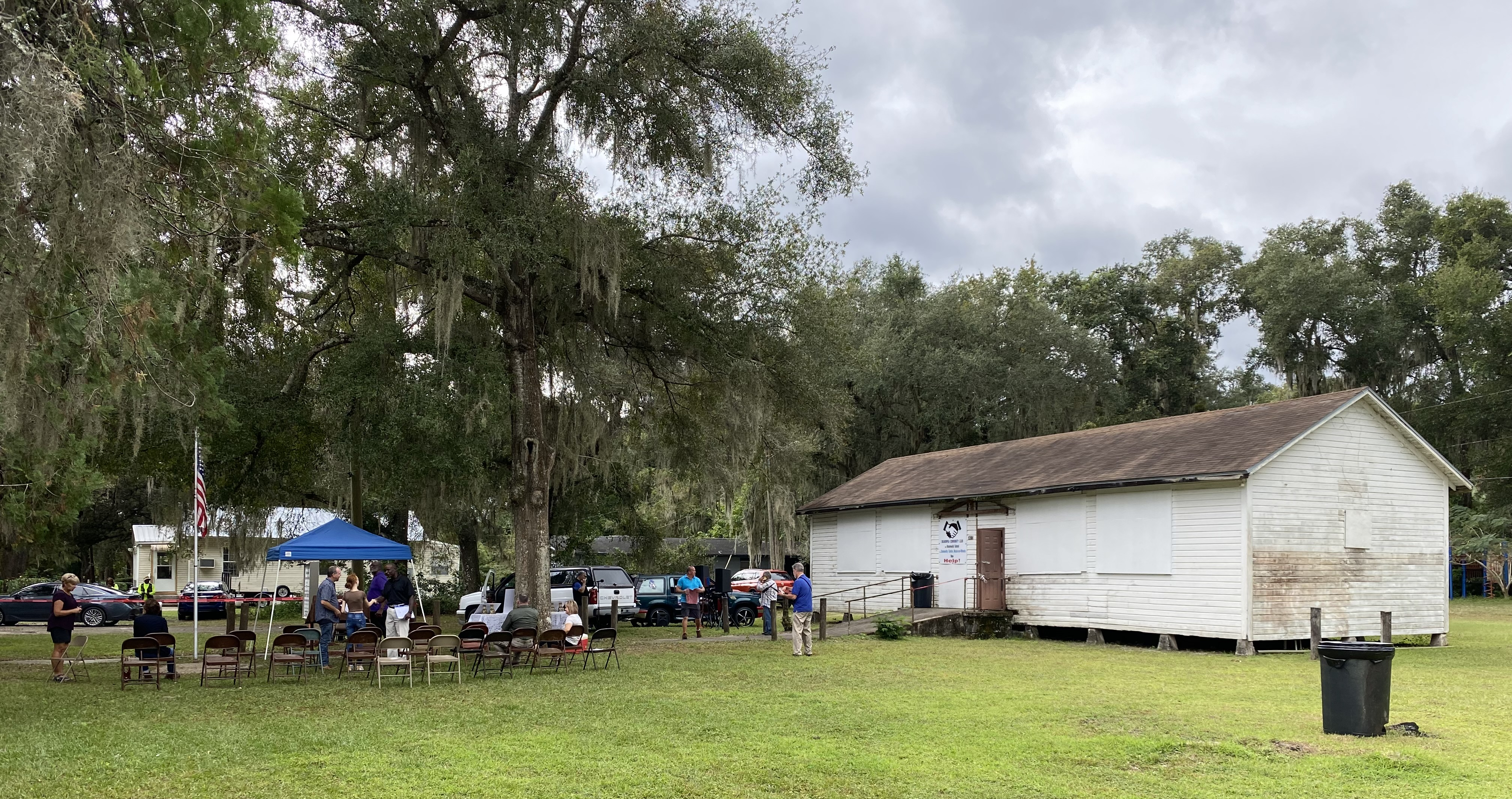
Okahumpka Rosenwald School

In 2022, the Okahumpka Community Club, an organization working to preserve the school, received a grant from the National Trust for Historic Preservation's African American Cultural Heritage Action Fund. The grant funds will be used to stabilize the school's foundation and restore the roof and windows.

The Okahumpka Rosenwald School has also earned a grant from the Florida Department of States Historical Resources Divisions 2022 African American Cultural and Historical grants program, also to restore the Okahumpka Rosenwald School but also to help construct a new Community Center on the site, that would be used in conjunction with and as a support facility for the Historic School.

== Notable alumni ==
- Virgil D. Hawkins
