= St. Matthews School (North Carolina) =

Historic school building in North Carolina, United States

- U.S. National Register of Historic Places
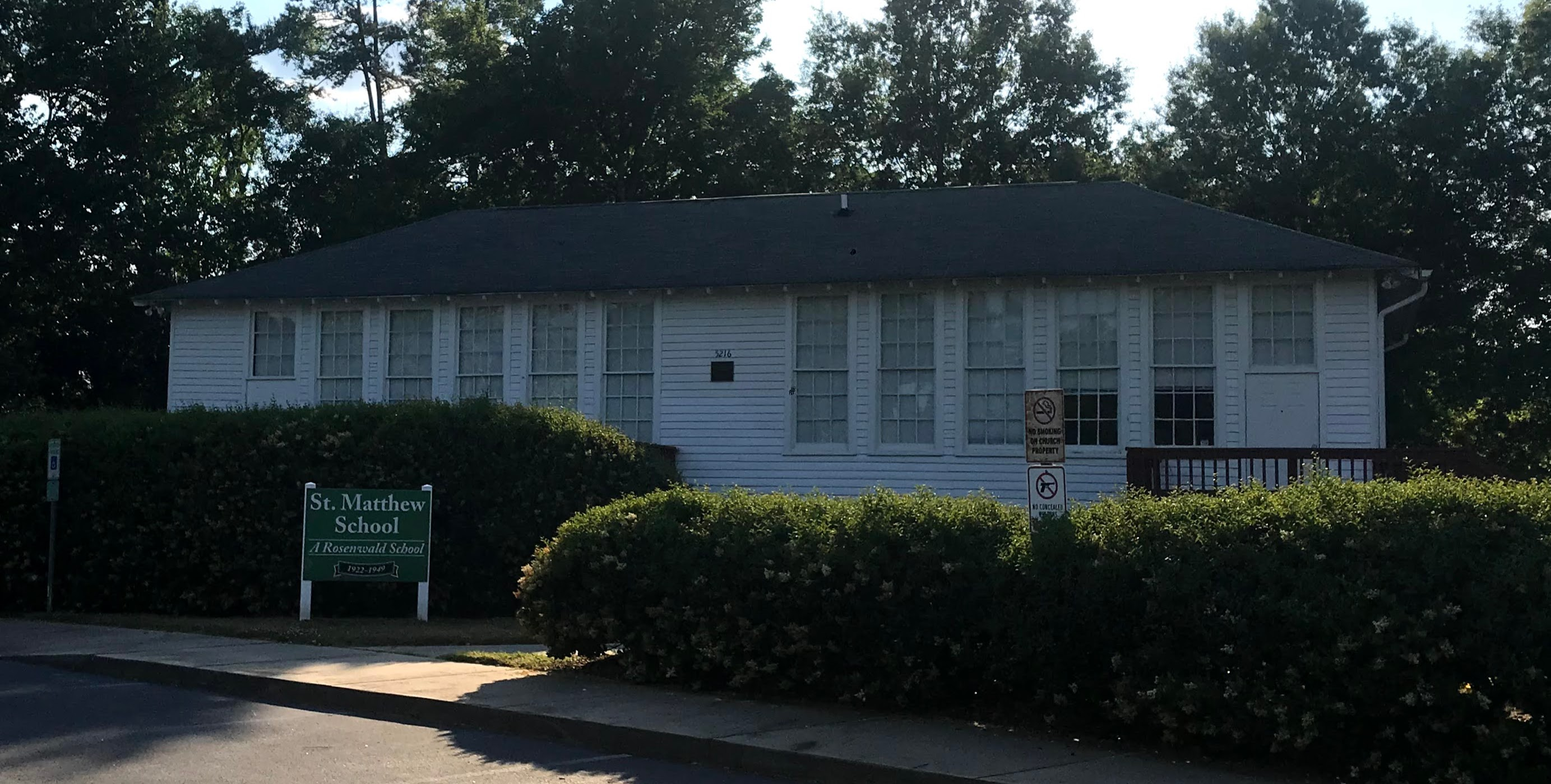

- Location within North Carolina Location within the United States
- Location: US 401, 0.5 miles (0.80 km) northeast of NC 2213, near Raleigh, North Carolina
- Coordinates: 35°51′37″N 78°33′41″W
- Area: 2 acres (0.81 ha)
- Built: 1922
- MPS: Wake County MPS
- NRHP reference No.: 01000416
- Added to NRHP: April 25, 2001

St. Matthews School, also known as St. Matthew School, is a historic Rosenwald School building located near Raleigh, Wake County, North Carolina. It was built in 1922, and is a one-story, frame building with a hipped roof and sheathed in weatherboard. It sits on a concrete block foundation. The school closed in 1949. St. Matthews Baptist Church owns the school and uses the building as a meeting hall.

It was listed on the National Register of Historic Places in 2001.
