= Carroll Rosenwald School =

- U.S. National Register of Historic Places
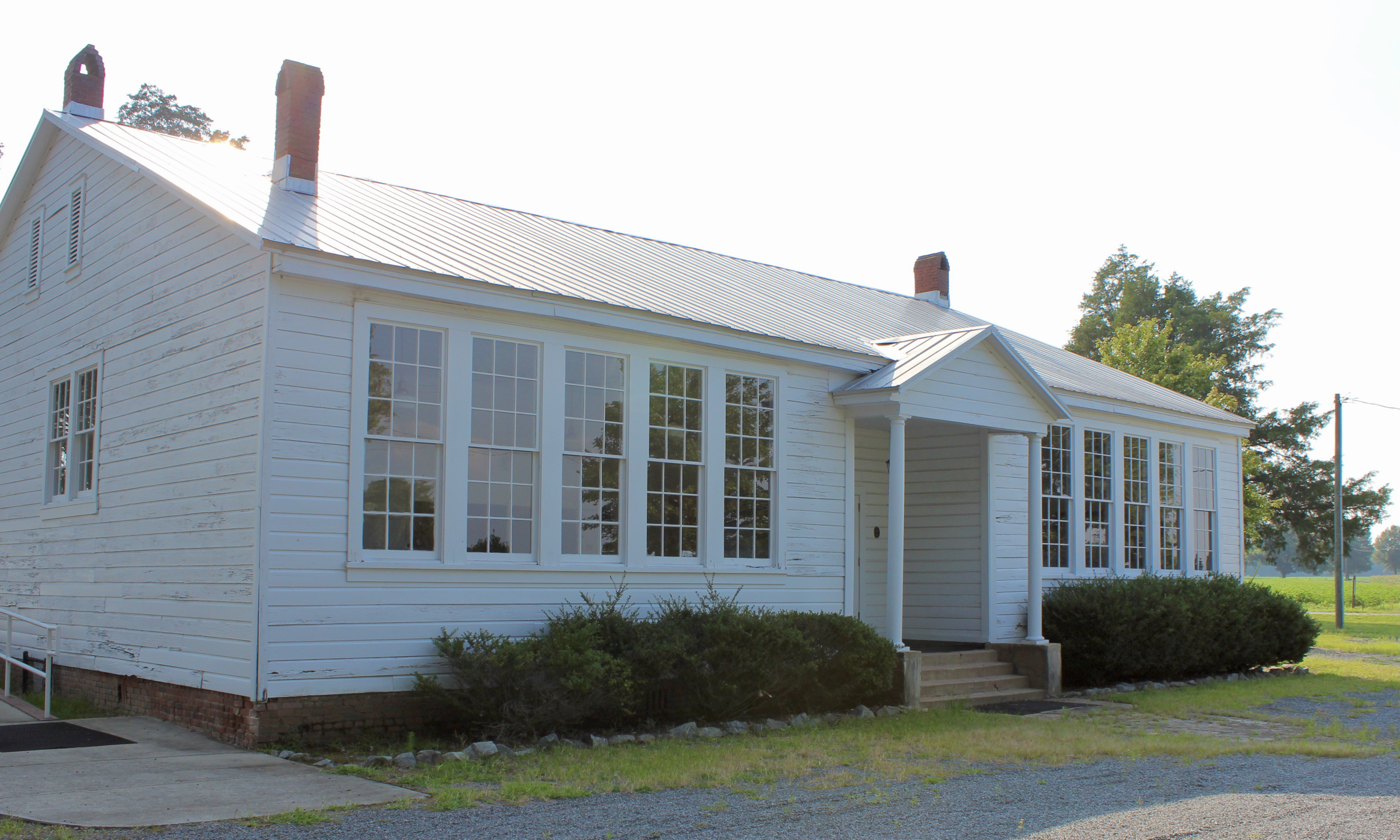
- Carroll Rosenwald School, 30 July 2021

- Location within South Carolina Location within the United States
- Location: 4789 Mobley Store Rd. Rock Hill, South Carolina
- Coordinates: 34°51′06″N 81°09′34″W
- Area: 1 acre (0.40 ha)
- Built: 1929
- MPS: Carroll Rosenwald School
- NRHP reference No.: 100002600
- Added to NRHP: June 25, 2018

Carroll Rosenwald School is a historical school building located at Rock Hill, York County, South Carolina.

== History ==
The Carroll Rosenwald School is a three-classroom frame structure located seven miles southwest of Rock Hill in York County. From 1929, the school served the African American community in the Ogden area of York County. It closed its doors permanently in 1954, but a restoration effort began in 2001, and was completed by 2004. It now serves as a place to teach students the Great Depression.

It was one of over 5,300 building built by and for African-American communities.

It was added to the National Register of Historic Places in 2018.

== See also ==
- Rosenwald School
