= Claudia Stack =

Educator, writer, documentarian and film producer

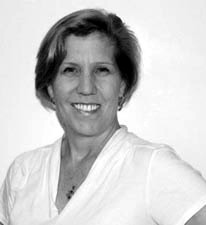

Claudia Stack (born May 3, 1966 - died December 24, 2023) was an educator, writer, and documentary filmmaker. Her film productions included “Under the Kudzu” (2012) and “Carrie Mae: An American Life” (2015), both of which focused on schools that African American families helped to build during the segregation era. African American families in the South built schools of many different kinds from Reconstruction through the 1950s. Rosenwald schools form the most recognizable part of this school-building movement. Rosenwald schools were schools that African American communities built in partnership with the Julius Rosenwald Fund, which from 1912 to 1932 helped to build almost 5,000 school buildings across the South.

Claudia received her bachelor's degree in 1988 from St. John's College. In 1992, Claudia graduated with a master's degree from Harvard University Graduate School of Education. Claudia wrote articles and books on education, African American school history, Rosenwald schools, and rural life. Her book Rosenwald School Reflections: Documentation and Preservation is a practical guide to documenting and preserving Rosenwald schools. Claudia worked closely with Historic Wilmington Foundation and community groups on several Rosenwald school restoration projects.

Claudia Stack's documentaries about Rosenwald Schools, including “Under the Kudzu” (2012) and “Carrie Mae: An American Life” (2015), have been screened at National Trust for Historic Preservation Conferences and at many other venues.

In 2009, Claudia started a conference at UNC Wilmington (UNCW) to celebrate African American educational heritage. Working with UNCW's Watson School of Education, the Department of History, and the Upperman African American Cultural Center, Claudia continued her involvement with this conference. The African American Educational Heritage Conference takes place on UNCW's campus every other year.

Claudia's documentary film work about historic African American schools has earned several awards. In June 2012 Claudia presented her film, “Under the Kudzu” at the first National Trust for Historic Preservation Rosenwald school conference, held at Tuskegee University in Tuskegee, Alabama. Claudia's film, “Carrie Mae: An American Life” premiered at the Cameron Art Museum in Wilmington, North Carolina in November 2014 and was also showcased at the 2015 National Trust for Historic Preservation Conference Rosenwald school conference in Durham, North Carolina. “Carrie Mae: An American Life” also won the bronze award at the 2015 International Independent Film Awards. Articles about her work have appeared in Harvard University's “Ed.” magazine, the StarNews newspaper, “Costco Connection” magazine, and other publications.

Other honors and awards that Claudia received include the 2011 David Brinkley Preservationist of the Year award, the 2012 Director's Choice Award at the Cape Fear Independent Film Festival, and the 2012 Gertrude S. Carraway Preservation Award.

Claudia produced a 90-minute film documentary titled "Sharecrop" about sharecropping and farming during the segregation era. This film project was supported by a grant from the Middle Road Foundation. She maintained a webpage featuring her work.
