= Billingsville School =

Historic school building in North Carolina, United States

- U.S. National Register of Historic Places
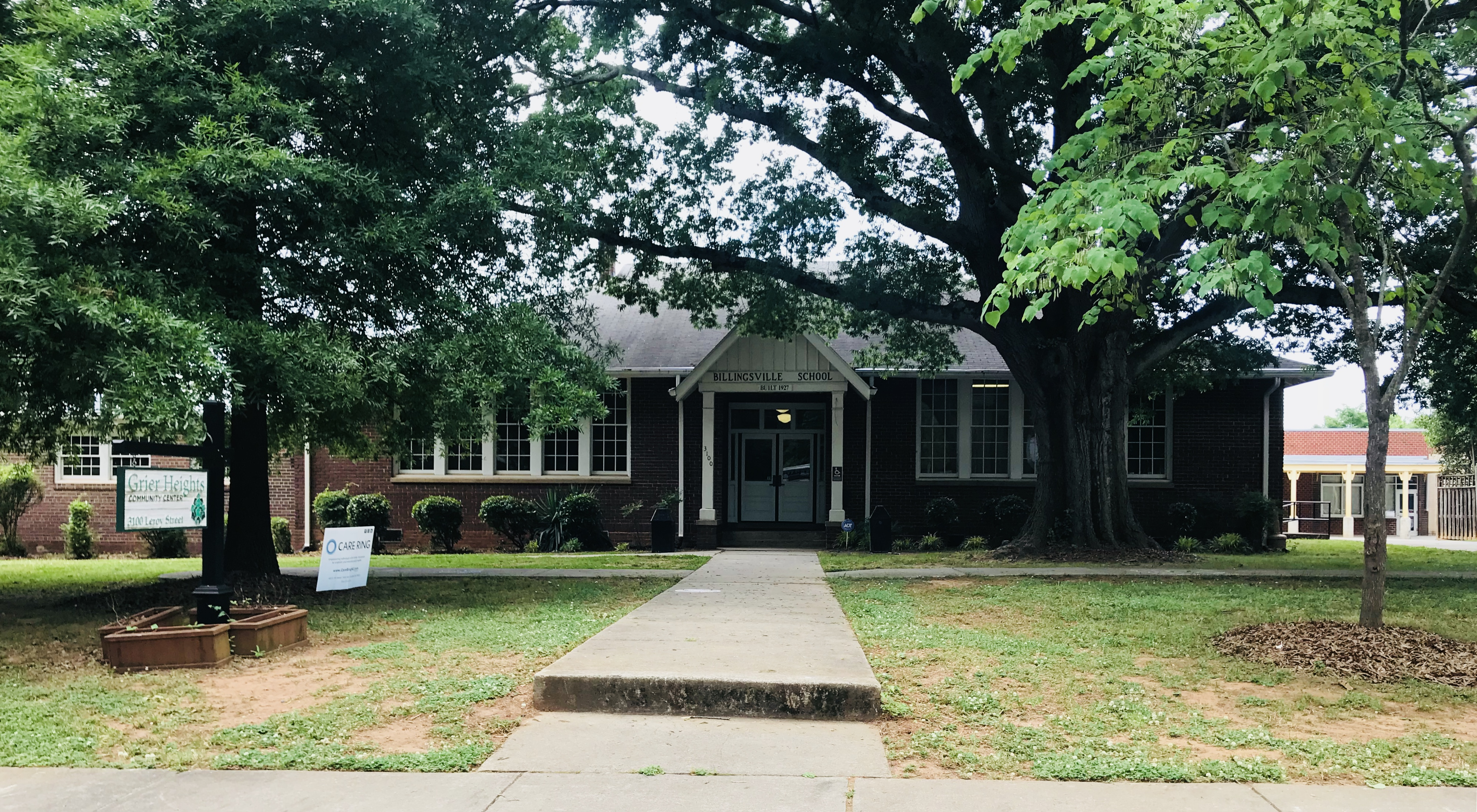

- Location within North Carolina Location within the United States
- Location: 3100 Leroy St., Charlotte, North Carolina
- Coordinates: 35°11′46″N 80°48′30″W
- Area: 3 acres (1.2 ha)
- Built: 1927, 1949
- Architectural style: Bungalow/craftsman
- NRHP reference No.: 99001366
- Added to NRHP: November 12, 1999

Billingsville School is a historic Rosenwald School building located in the Grier Heights community of Charlotte, Mecklenburg County, North Carolina. It was built in 1927 as a school for African-American students. It is a one-story, hip-roofed school building in the Bungalow and American Craftsmanstyles, with a brick veneer, symmetrical facade, and a steeply pitched front-gable porch. A small, flat-roofed brick addition was built in 1949.

It was added to the National Register of Historic Places in 1999.
