= Washington School (Washington, Virginia) =

- Washington Graded School
- U.S. National Register of Historic Places
- Virginia Landmarks Register
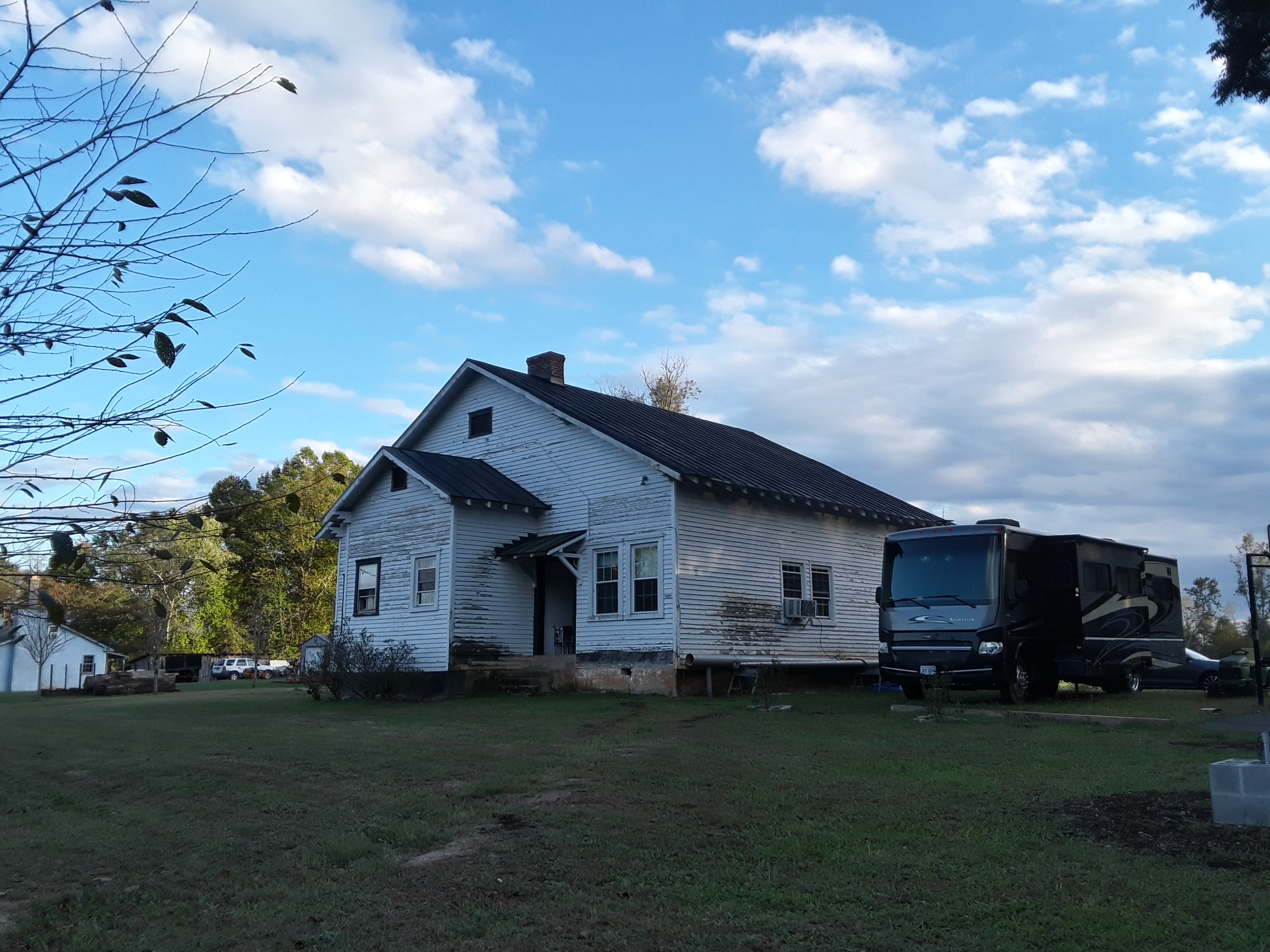
- The building in 2019

- Location within Virginia Location within the United States
- Location: 267 Piedmont Avenue, Washington, Virginia
- Coordinates: 38°42′47″N 78°9′53″W
- Area: 2 acres (0.81 ha)
- Built: 1923
- Architect: Samuel Smith
- Architectural style: Bungalow/craftsman
- MPS: Rosenwald Schools in Virginia MPS
- NRHP reference No.: 100003349

Significant dates
- Added to NRHP: January 24, 2019
- Designated VLR: June 21, 2018

Washington Graded School is a historic school located in Rappahannock County, Virginia. It was constructed around 1923 as a two-teacher school. The building is a "Rosenwald School." Rosenwald schools refer to those buildings constructed for the education of African-American students, with financial support and plans provided by the Rosenwald Fund. Julius Rosenwald, a Chicago philanthropist and president of Sears, Roebuck and Company, along with Booker T. Washington, the principal of Tuskegee Institute, worked with Black communities across the south to build more than 5,000 schools for Black children. Built in 79 localities in Virginia, about half shared the Washington School two-teacher design. The Washington School, which closed in 1963, retains the early look and feel of its rural setting, and exhibits historic integrity of design, workmanship, and materials.

Washington School was built in 1924 after the Parents’ Civic League, a local African-American organization, donated land to the school district. Financial contributions to construct the two-teacher school came from the Black community ($1,200), the county ($1,600), and the Julius Rosenwald Fund ($700), which also supplied the building plans, according to the Virginia Department of Historic Resources.

The school has been designated as a Virginia Historic Landmark and was added to the National Register of Historic Places in January 2019.
