= Sweet Home Vocational and Agricultural High School =

- U.S. National Register of Historic Places
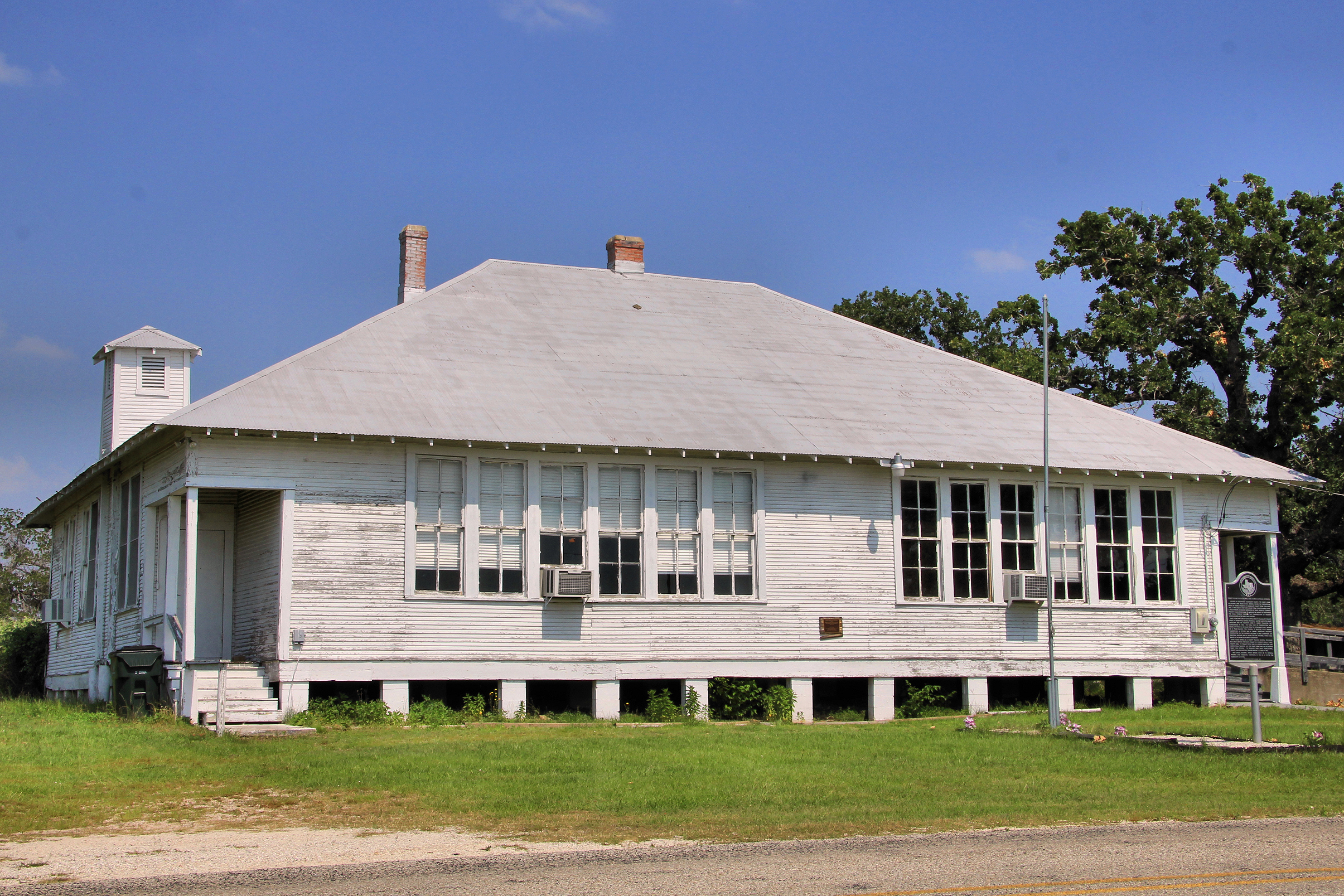
- Sweet Home Vocational and Agricultural High School, 2013
- Location: Guadalupe County, Texas
- Coordinates: 29.46103°N 98.03896°W
- NRHP reference No.: 98001417
- Added to NRHP: November 19, 1998

Sweet Home Vocational and Agricultural High School (1924-1962) was a school for African American students in Guadalupe County, Texas. It was a Rosenwald School as it was partial funded by the Rosenwald Fund.

Since November 1998 the school building has been a registered National Historic Landmark.

== History ==
=== Construction ===
Carpenter Henry Singletary built the school along with assistant, Jesse C. Ussery. Construction costs were around $5,500, $1,000 of which was provided by the Rosenwald Fund.

=== Use ===
Sweet Home Vocational and Agricultural High School started as a vocational school focused on industrial and agricultural training for students beyond 8th grade. It was one of six Rosenwald Schools in Guadalupe County.

It became a public high school in 1935, closing in 1962.
