= Freetown Rosenwald School =

- U.S. National Register of Historic Places
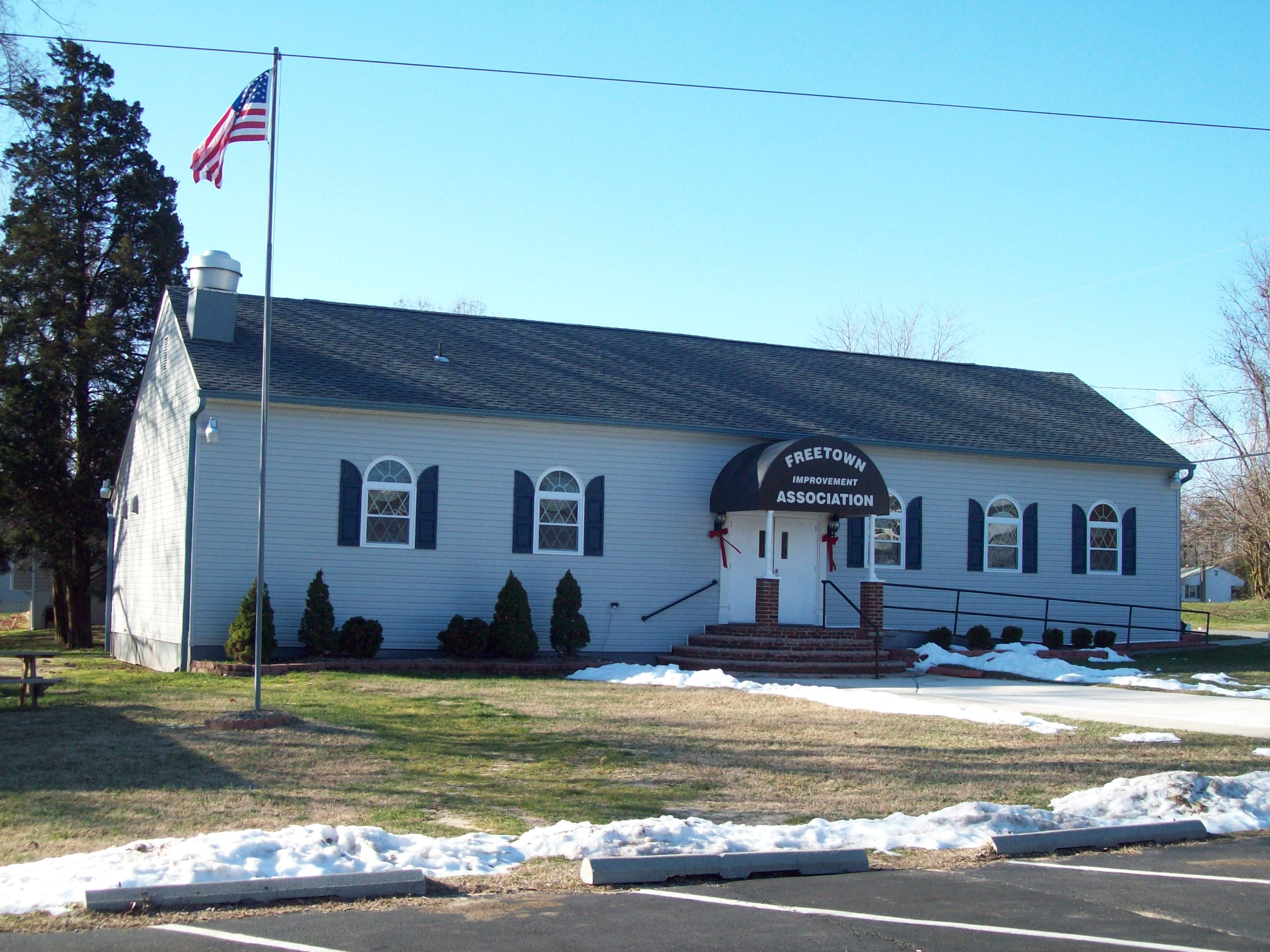
- Freetown Rosenwald School, December 2009

- Location within Maryland Location within the United States
- Location: 7825 Freetown Rd., Glen Burnie, Maryland
- Coordinates: 39°8′27″N 76°34′38″W
- Area: 1.3 acres (0.53 ha)
- Built: 1924
- Architectural style: Rosenwald Two Room Shop-B
- MPS: Rosenwald Schools of Anne Arundel County, Maryland MPS
- NRHP reference No.: 07000943
- Added to NRHP: September 12, 2007

Freetown Rosenwald School is a historic Rosenwald school building in the historic African American community of Freetown at Glen Burnie, Anne Arundel County, Maryland. It is a simple, one-story, gable-roofed, rectangular frame building. The exterior walls are sheathed in aluminum siding and the gable roof is covered with asphalt shingles and displays minimal overhang. It was built in 1924–25, by the school construction program of the Julius Rosenwald Fund, to serve the local African American community. It is one of ten Rosenwald Schools surviving in Anne Arundel County.

It was listed on the National Register of Historic Places in 2007.
