= Hannah Rosenwald School =

- U.S. National Register of Historic Places
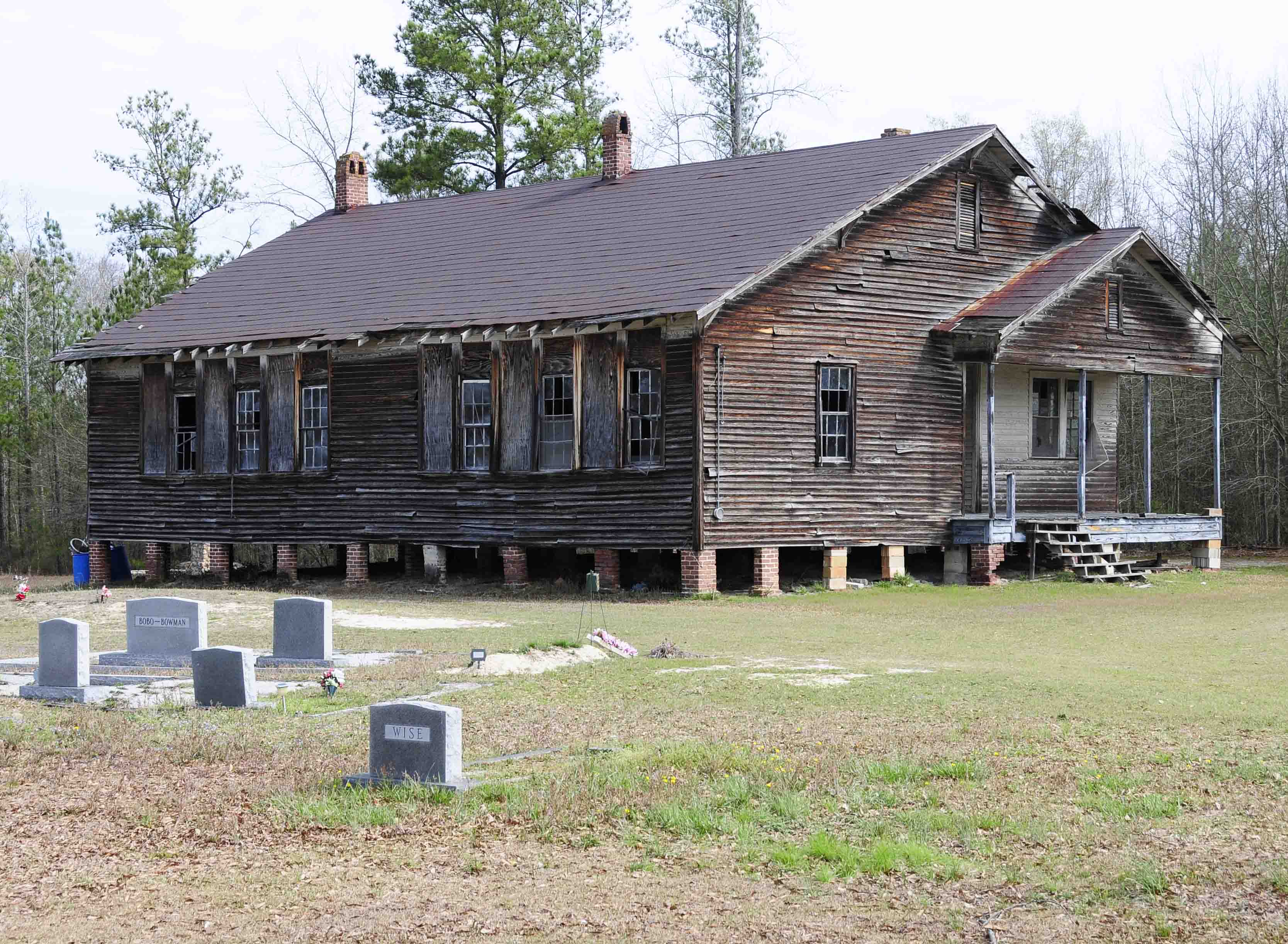
- Hannah Rosenwald School, March 2012

- Location within South Carolina Location within the United States
- Nearest city: 61 Deadfall Rd., near Newberry, South Carolina
- Coordinates: 34°10′52″N 81°38′02″W
- Area: 4 acres (1.6 ha)
- Built: 1924-1925
- Architectural style: Bungalow/craftsman
- MPS: Rosenwald School Building Program in South Carolina, 1917-1932
- NRHP reference No.: 08001369
- Added to NRHP: January 22, 2009

Hannah Rosenwald School is a historic Rosenwald school located near Newberry, Newberry County, South Carolina. It was built in 1924–1925, and is a one-story, frame, three-teacher type school. The school included three classrooms, three cloakrooms, an industrial room, and an entry hall. The school was affiliated with the Hannah A.M.E. Church and closed in the 1960s.

It was listed on the National Register of Historic Places in 2009.
