= Russell School (Durham, North Carolina) =

Historic school building in North Carolina, United States

- U.S. National Register of Historic Places
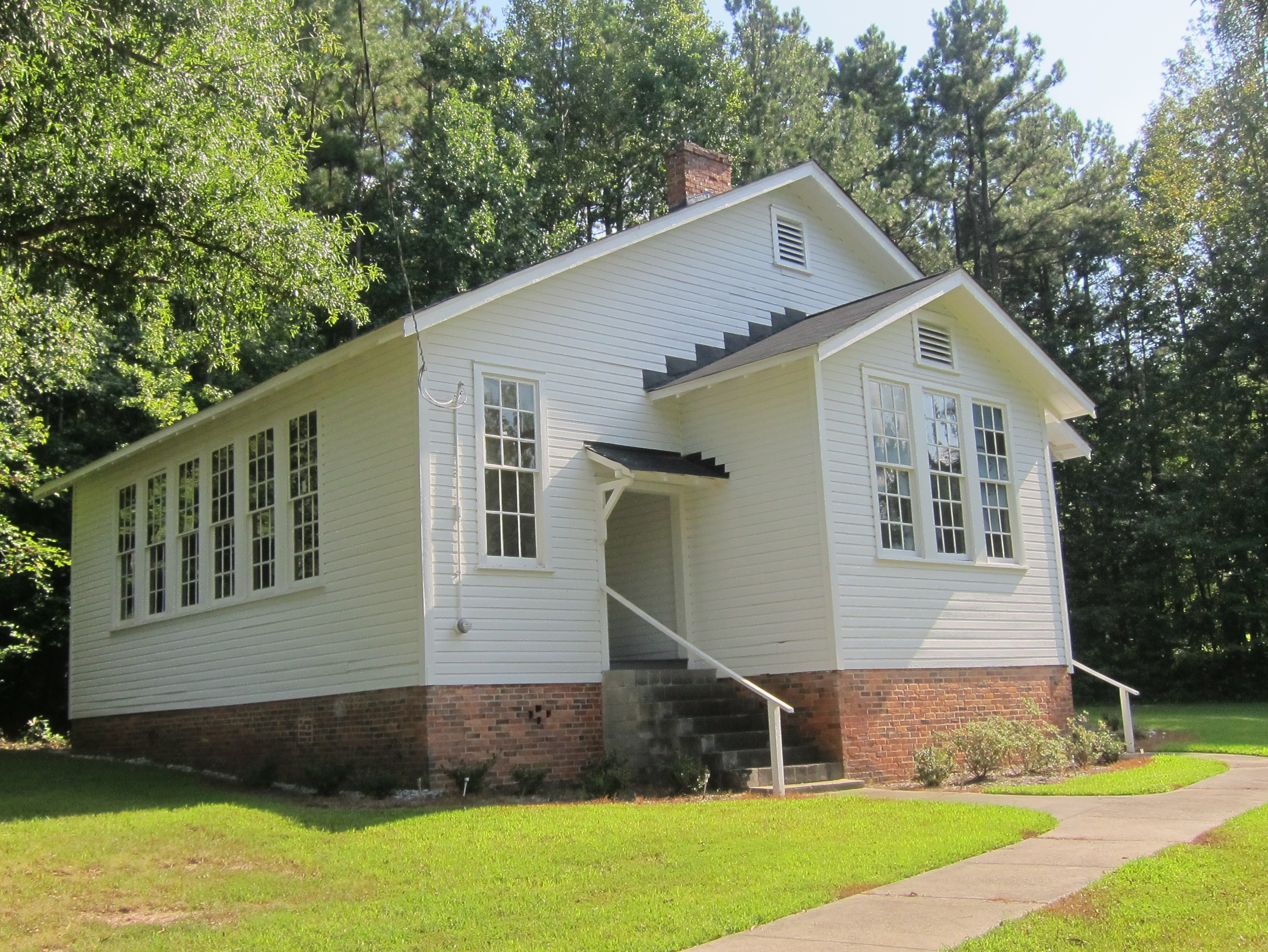

- Location within North Carolina Location within the United States
- Location: 2001 St. Mary's Rd. (south side SR 1002 .1 miles (0.16 km) west of junction with SR 1003), near Durham, North Carolina
- Coordinates: 36°7′24″N 78°56′45″W
- Area: 2 acres (0.81 ha)
- Built: 1926-1927
- Architectural style: Rosenwald
- NRHP reference No.: 09000601
- Added to NRHP: August 5, 2009

Russell School, also known as Cain's School, is a historic Rosenwald school located near Durham, Durham County, North Carolina. It was built in 1926–1927, and is a one-story, front-gabled weatherboarded building. It features a center projecting wing containing the original industrial room, flanking recessed entrances, and two large classrooms. Construction of the school was made possible due to the notable efforts of Durham Jeanes supervisor Carrie Thomas Jordan. The school closed in 1945 and has been owned by Cain's Chapel Baptist Church and used as a community center.

It was listed on the National Register of Historic Places in 2009.
