= George Washington Carver High School (Picayune, Mississippi) =

Former segregated public school in Mississippi

Coordinates: 30.525641°N 89.670495°W

Carver High School
- Picayune, Mississippi; United States

Information
- Former name: East Side Colored School
- Type: Public
- Nickname: Pirates

George Washington Carver High School was a public secondary school in Picayune, Mississippi, United States. It served as the high school for black students until the public schools were integrated in 1970. The buildings are now Carver Elementary School.

== History ==
Carver was founded as East Side Colored School in 1919. When the school was renamed Carver, it also absorbed another black school, the Pearl River County Training School. That school had been originally constructed in 1900, then replaced in 1919 by a Rosenwald School, also known as Pearl River County Training School. Because the school was underfunded, it was not uncommon for classes to contain over 50 students. The principal of Carver High School was John Prentiss Johnson, from 1943 to 1970 when he became the Title I administrator for Picayune Public Schools. He was instrumental in changing the attrition rate of black students in Picayune, MS among the many changes he accomplished at Carver during his leadership. In the late 1960s, Carver's football team, under coach Marion L. Henley, gained national attention when it went on a 64 game winning streak. The buildings are now occupied by the Southside Upper and Lower elementaries. Picayune now hosts the Carver Culture Museum which includes a history of Carver High School, a Picayune section, and a black history section.
