= Free Hill, Tennessee =

- Unincorporated community
- Location within Tennessee
- Coordinates: 36°33′44″N 85°29′32″W
- Country: United States
- State: Tennessee
- County: Clay
- Elevation: 189 m (620 ft)
- Time zone: UTC-6 (Central Time Zone)
  - Summer (DST): UTC-5 (Central Time Zone)
- Area code: 931
- GNIS feature ID: 1284872

- Free Hills Rosenwald School
- U.S. National Register of Historic Places
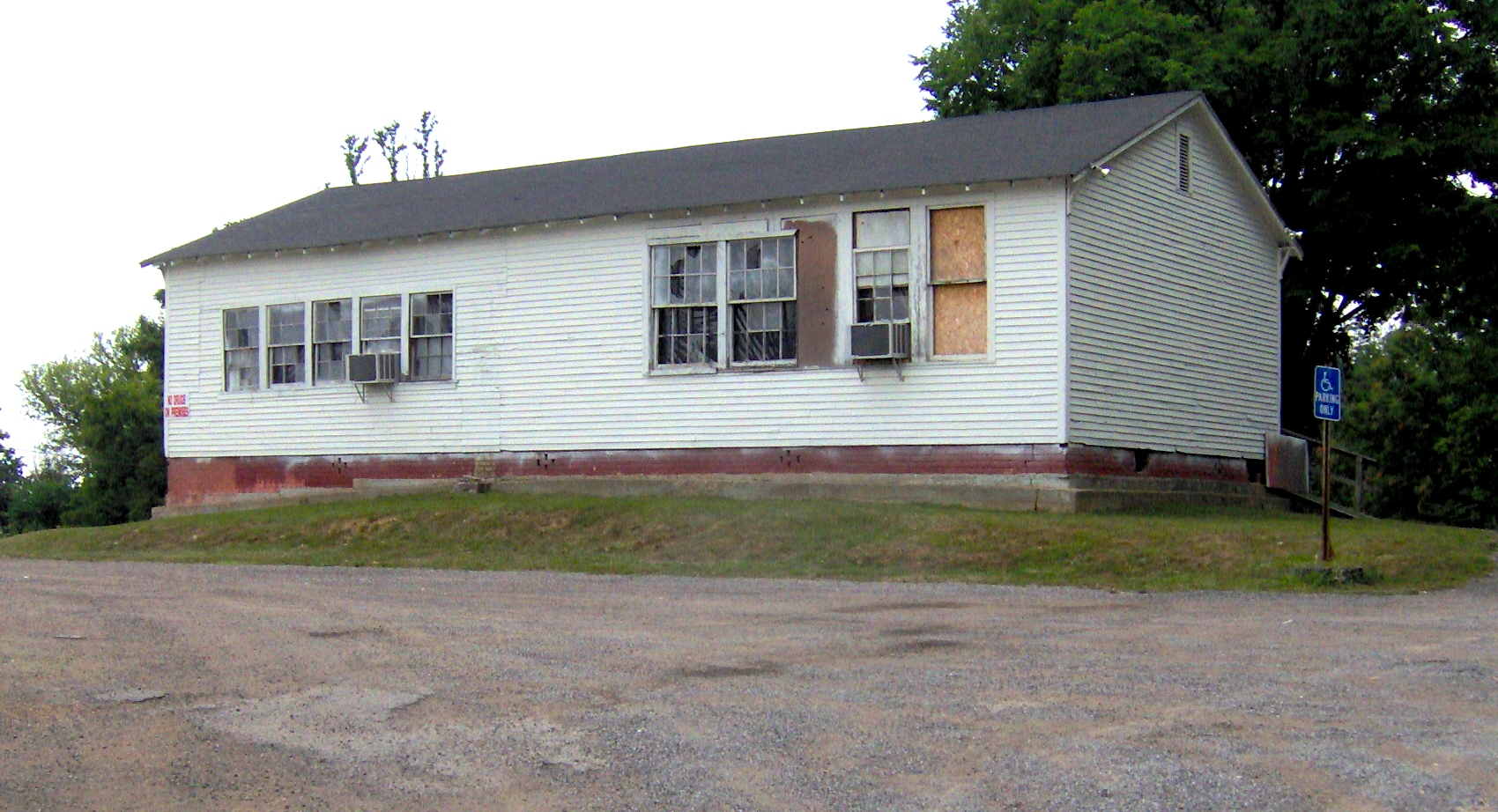
- The old Free Hills Rosenwald School at Free Hills Community Park
- Location: Free Hills Rd., E of TN 52, Free Hill, Tennessee
- Coordinates: 36°33′45.5″N 85°29′12.7″W
- Area: 1 acre (0.40 ha)
- Built: 1929
- Built by: Samuel L. Smith
- Architectural style: Rosenwald School Plan
- NRHP reference No.: 96001360
- Added to NRHP: November 15, 1996

Free Hill (also called Free Hills) is an unincorporated community in Clay County, Tennessee, United States. It is an African American community established in 1816, before the Civil War.

== History ==
The original inhabitants were the freed slaves of Virginia Hill, the daughter of a wealthy North Carolina planter. After purchasing 2,000 acres (8 km^{2}) of isolated hilly land, Hill freed her slaves and turned the property over to them. Folklore suggests that the original residents included Virginia Hill's own mulatto children.

In the aftermath of the Civil War, with a logging boom pushing them economically, the residents of the nearby mainly white town of Celina began terrorizing the townspeople of Freehill, and burned down their school and church; in 1878 just before elections they drove all Black residents from the town violently. Once the Democratic party swept most of the seats in Congress, the whites holding the land were permitted by the new government to keep the stolen land and farms--one example is that of Cordell Hull, FDR's Secretary of State, whose family gained a large farm and land.

At its peak, the community had about 300 residents and included two grocery stores, three clubs, two eating establishments, two churches, and a school. Today, Free Hill's population is approximately 70.

=== Free Hills Rosenwald School ===
The settlement's Rosenwald school was one of 354 schools for African Americans built in the early 20th century with financial support from the Julius Rosenwald Fund. The Free Hills Rosenwald School was used from approximately 1925 to 1949. The structure, which is believed to be one of only about 30 Rosenwald schools still standing, was placed on the National Register of Historic Places in 1996.

=== Recent years ===
A small number of residents remain in Free Hill, whose population has declined since the 1960s. In September 1993, the state of Tennessee placed a historical marker on Tennessee State Route 53 to identify the community and commemorate its history.

== Geography ==
The community is located in central Clay County north of the confluence of the Cumberland and Obey Rivers. It is accessible by means of several locally-maintained roadways off Tennessee State Route 53 northeast of Celina.
