= Panther Branch School =

Historic school building in North Carolina, United States

- U.S. National Register of Historic Places
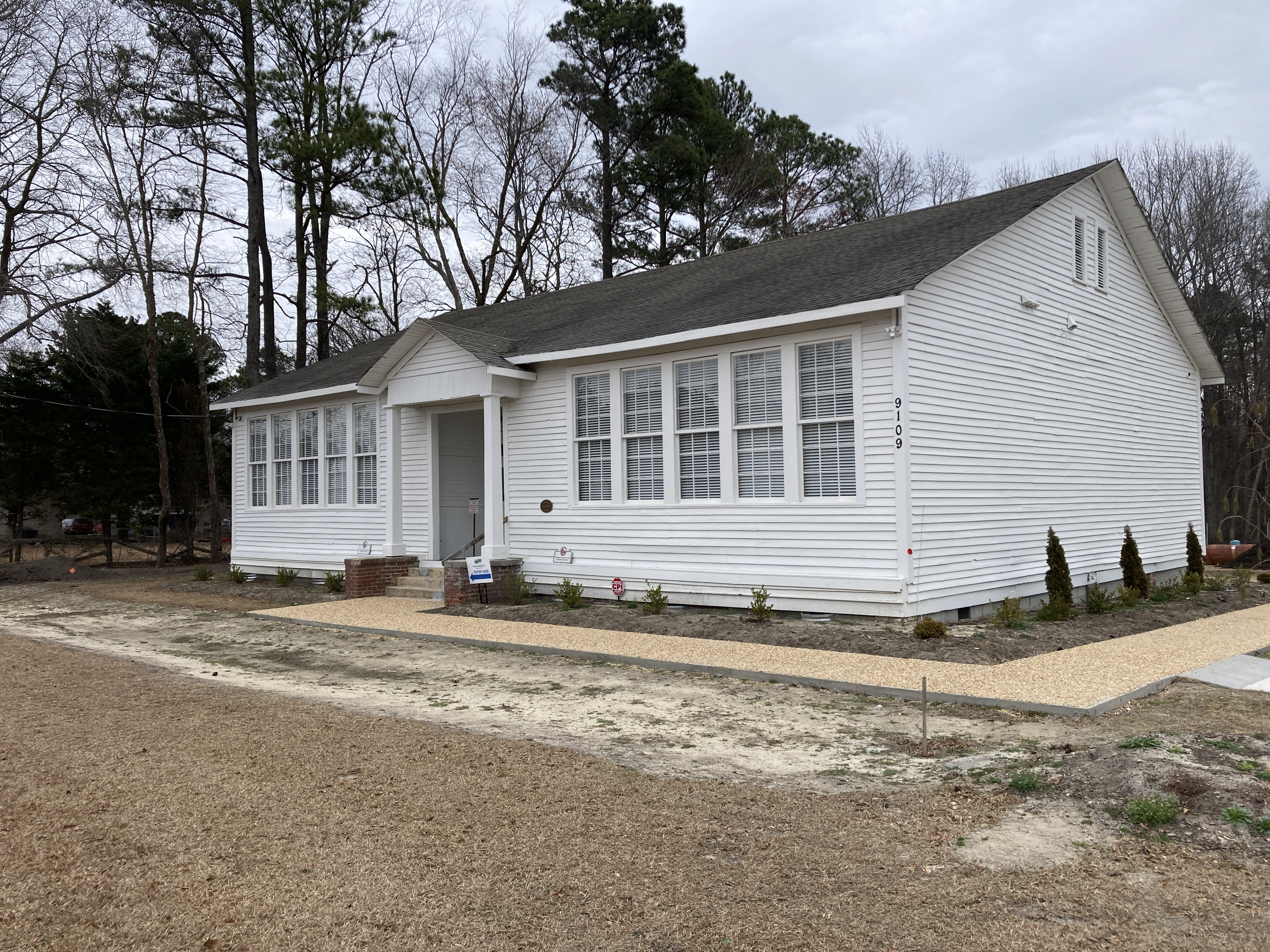
- Panther Branch Rosenwald School 2022

- Location within North Carolina Location within the United States
- Location: NC 2727, 0.5 miles (0.80 km) south of NC 183, near Raleigh, North Carolina
- Coordinates: 35°37′59″N 78°38′28″W
- Area: 2 acres (0.81 ha)
- Built: 1926
- Built by: Ballentine Co.
- Architectural style: Colonial Revival
- MPS: Wake County MPS
- NRHP reference No.: 01000421
- Added to NRHP: May 8, 2001

Panther Branch School, also known as Juniper Level School, is a historic Rosenwald School building located near Raleigh, Wake County, North Carolina. It was built in 1926, and is a one-story, frame, weatherboarded building with Colonial Revival style design elements. It sits on a brick pier foundation infilled with concrete block. The school closed in 1952. It is owned by the Juniper Level Baptist Church, which uses the building as a meeting place and social hall.

It was listed on the National Register of Historic Places in 2001.
