= Concord School (Franklin County, North Carolina) =

Historic school building in North Carolina, United States

- U.S. National Register of Historic Places
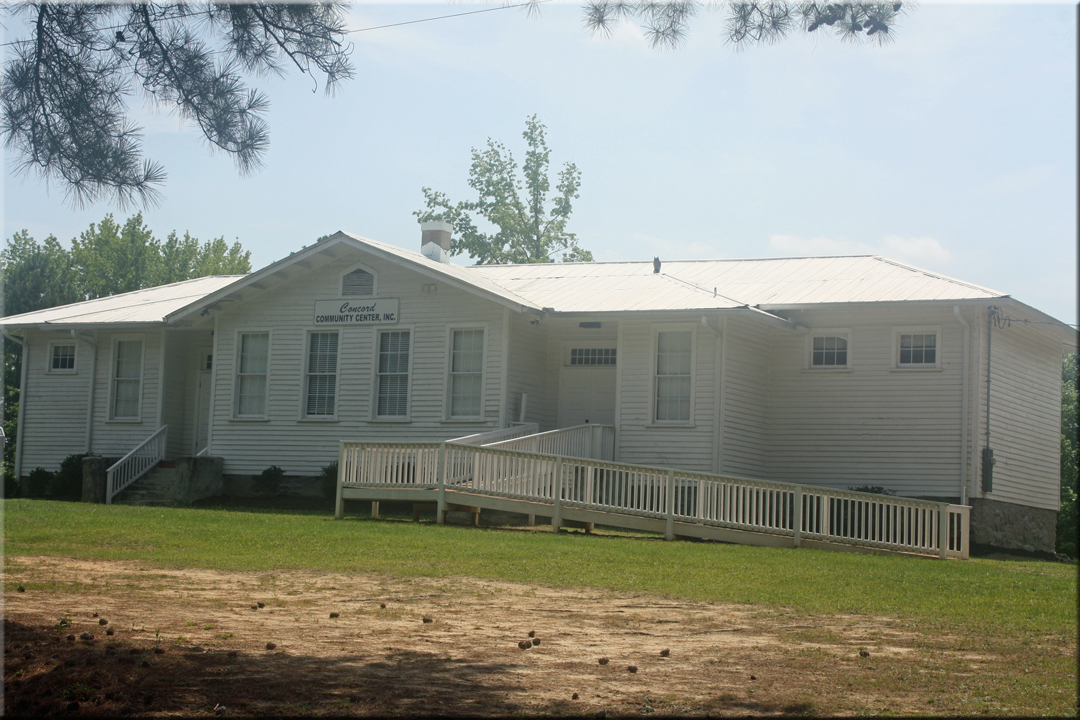
- A photo of the Concord School.

- Location within North Carolina Location within the United States
- Location: 645 Walter Grissom Rd., Kittrell, North Carolina, United States
- Coordinates: 36°9′47″N 78°22′47″W
- Area: 2.7 acres (1.1 ha)
- Built: 1922
- Architectural style: Rosenwald Community School Floor Plan No. 20 (Modified)
- NRHP reference No.: 100002517
- Added to NRHP: May 31, 2018

The Concord School, currently called the Concord Community Center, is a historic Rosenwald School located at 645 Walter Grissom Road between Kittrell and Franklinton in northwestern Franklin County, North Carolina. Built in 1922 and primarily financed by the Julius Rosenwald Foundation, the school is a single story, hip-roofed frame building which consisted of three classrooms, a three-bay industrial room and a cloakroom. The Concord School served African-American students within the local community until it closed in 1955. Students were then moved to the B.F. Person School (now Franklinton Elementary School) in nearby Franklinton.

It was listed on the National Register of Historic Places in 2018. Recently restored in 2022, the Concord School is currently managed by a non-profit organization with member alumnus and used as a community center.
