= East Suffolk Complex =

- U.S. National Register of Historic Places
- Virginia Landmarks Register
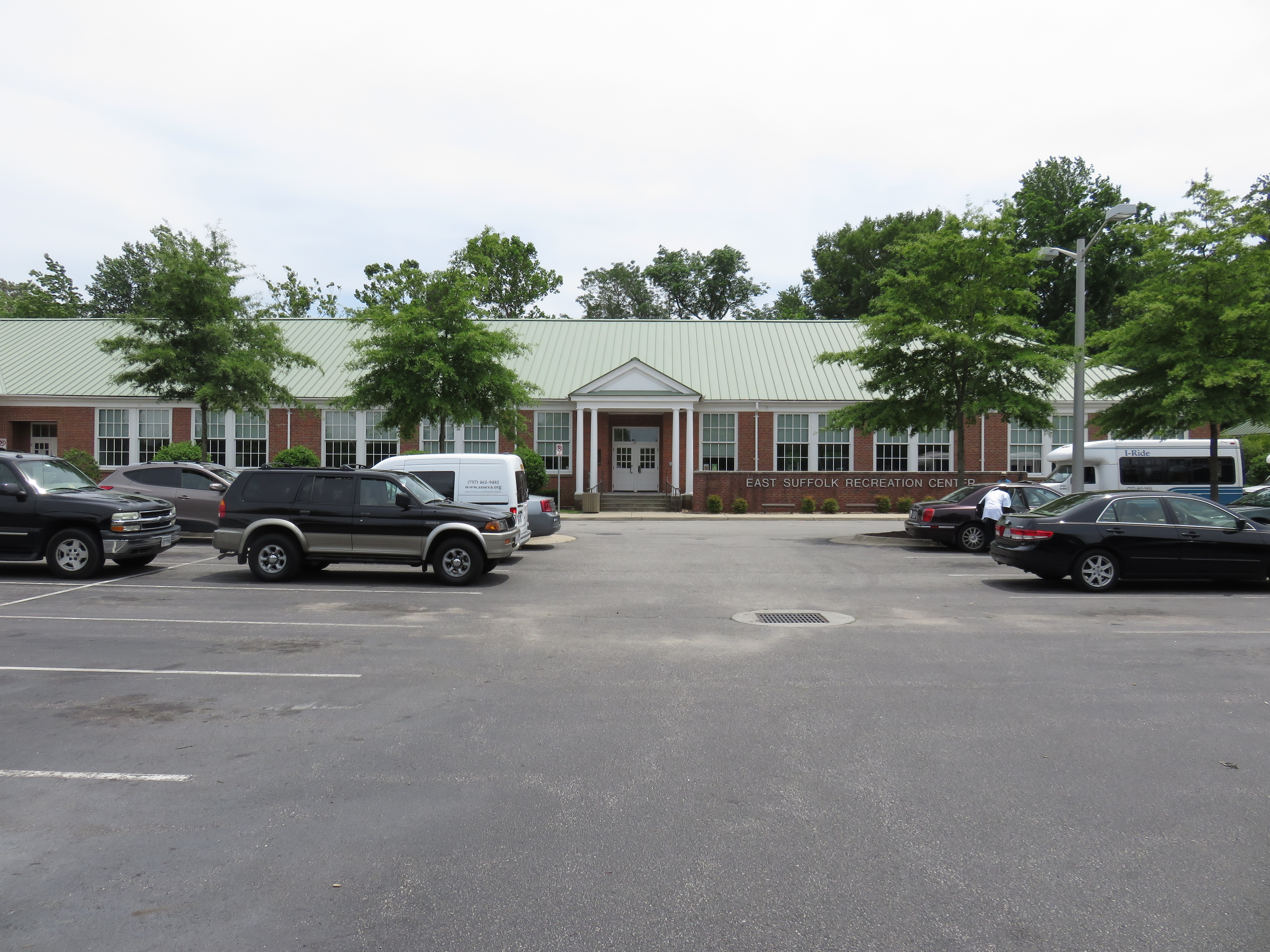
- Former high school

- Location within Virginia Location within the United States
- Location: 231 S. 7th St., Suffolk, Virginia
- Coordinates: 36°43′30″N 76°33′51″W
- Area: 6 acres (2.4 ha)
- Built: 1926-1927, 1938-1939, 1951
- Architectural style: Colonial Revival, Moderne
- NRHP reference No.: 03000743
- VLR No.: 133-5046

Significant dates
- Added to NRHP: August 4, 2003
- Designated VLR: December 4, 2002

East Suffolk Complex is a historic school complex for African-American students located at Suffolk, Virginia. The complex consists of the East Suffolk Elementary School (1926–1927), East Suffolk High School (1938–1939), and the Gymnasium building (1951).

== History ==
The East Suffolk Elementary School, built as a Rosenwald School, is a one-story, Colonial Revival style, brick school with a central auditorium flanked by classrooms. The East Suffolk High School is a Colonial Revival style, one-story brick building with a double-loaded corridor plan, and eight classrooms. It was built with Public Works Administration funds. A cafeteria wing was added in 1952. The Gymnasium is a concrete block building with applied 5-course American bond brick veneer. The complex closed in 1979. The complex is now a public recreation center.

It was added to the National Register of Historic Places in 2003.

== Gallery ==
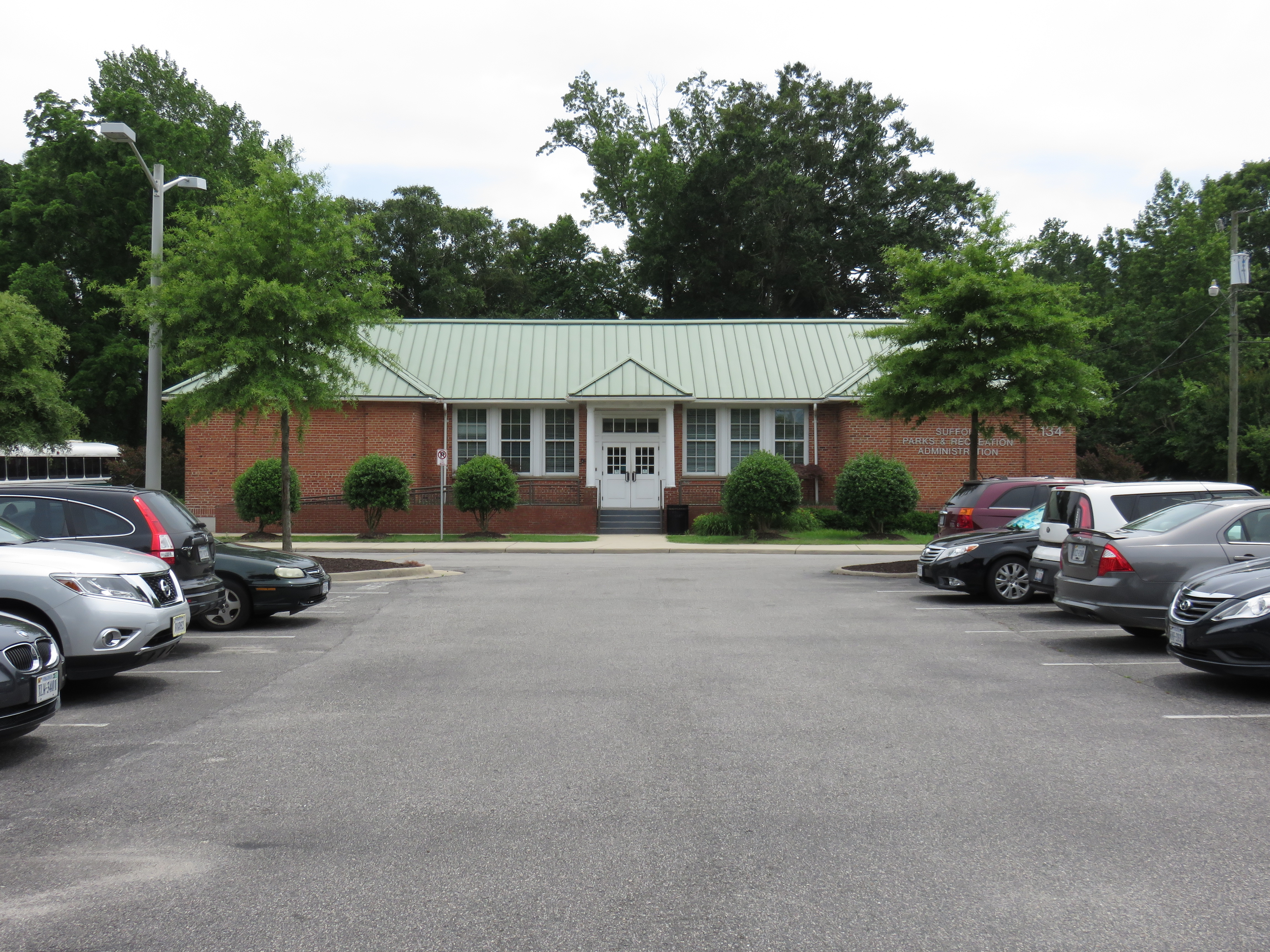
Former elementary school

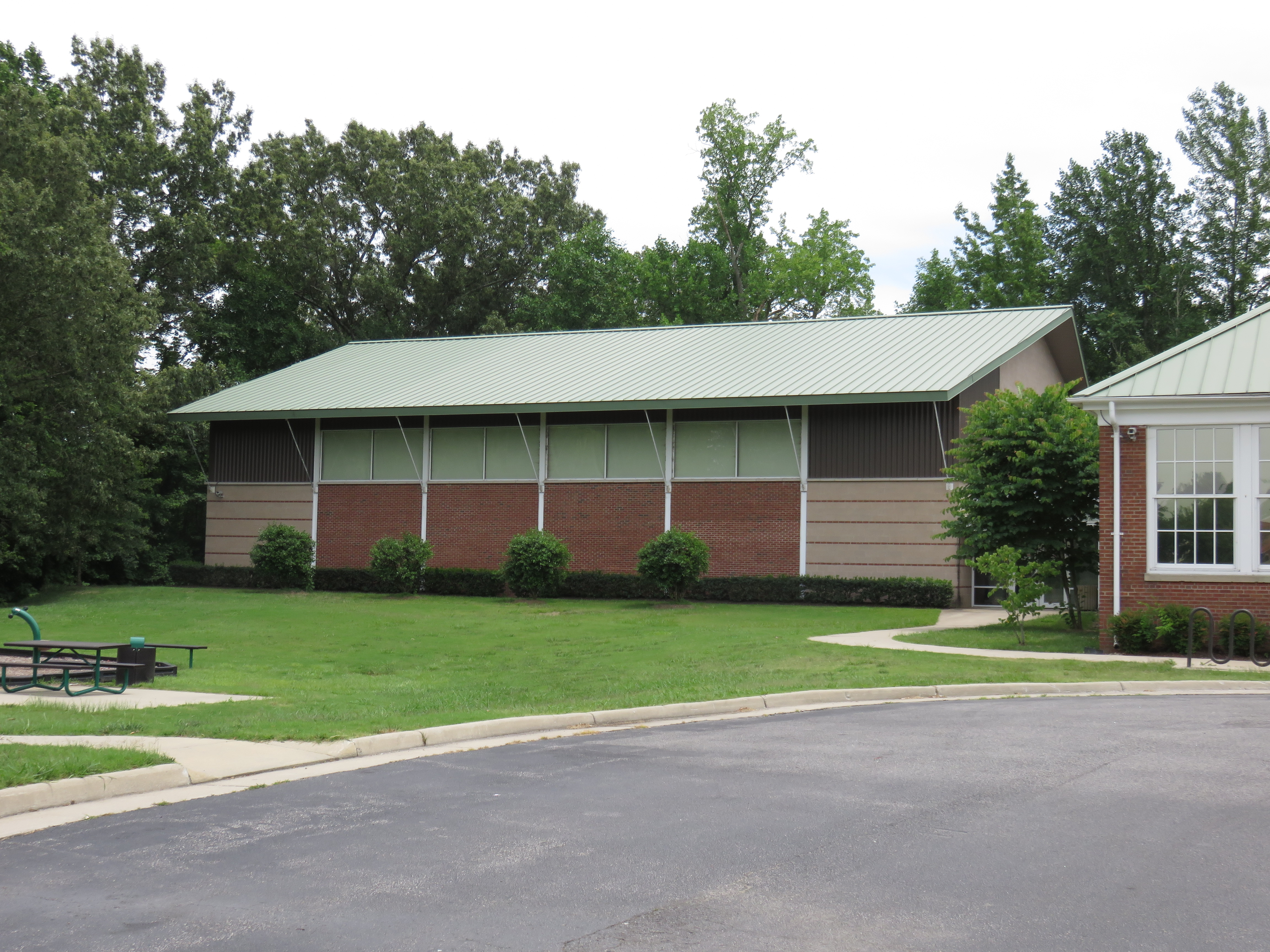
Gymnasium
