= Gibson County Training School =

- U.S. National Register of Historic Places
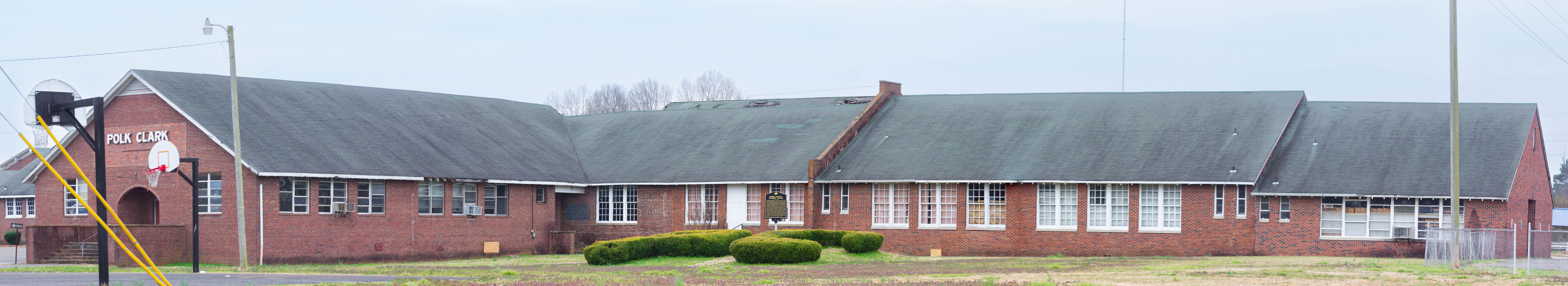

- Location within Tennessee Location within the United States
- Location: 1041 Harris St.., Milan, Tennessee
- Coordinates: 35°58′51″N 88°56′29″W
- Area: less than one acre
- Built: 1926
- Architectural style: Two-part Commercial
- NRHP reference No.: 12000117
- Added to NRHP: April 12, 2012

The Gibson County Training School is a historic educational facility in Milan, Tennessee, that was built in 1926 with financial support from the Rosenwald Fund. It was listed on the National Register of Historic Places in 2012.
