= Olmstead, Kentucky =

Unincorporated community in Kentucky, United States

- Unincorporated community
- Location within Kentucky Location within the United States
- Coordinates: 36°45′8″N 87°00′54″W
- Country: United States
- State: Kentucky
- County: Logan
- Elevation: 581 ft (177 m)
- Time zone: UTC-6 (Central (CST))
  - Summer (DST): UTC-5 (CDT)
- ZIP code: 42265
- Area codes: 270 and 364
- GNIS feature ID: 499937

Olmstead is an unincorporated community in Logan County, Kentucky, United States.

Olmstead was a station on the L & N railroad between Bowling Green, KY and Clarksville, TN that opened in 1860. It was named after a leader in the effort to build the railroad. Olmstead is also the site of an elementary and middle school. A post office has been in operation until recently in Olmstead since 1862.
