= Rosenwald School =

Schools in the United States

Teachers in front of a Rosenwald School, 1916

The Rosenwald School project built more than 5,000 schools, shops, and teacher homes in the United States primarily for the education of African-American children in the South, during the Jim Crow period in the early 20th century. The project was the product of the partnership of Julius Rosenwald, a Jewish-American clothier who became part-owner and president of Sears, Roebuck and Company and the African-American leader, educator, and philanthropist Booker T. Washington, who was president of the Tuskegee Institute.

The need arose from the chronic underfunding of public education for African-American children in the South, as black people had been discriminated against at the turn of the 20th century and excluded from the political system in that region. Children were permitted to attend only segregated schools, which did not exist in many places.

Rosenwald was the founder of the Rosenwald Fund. He contributed seed money for many schools and other philanthropic causes. To encourage local commitment to these projects, he conditioned the Fund's support on the local communities' raising of matching funds. To promote collaboration between black and white people, Rosenwald required communities to also commit public funds and/or labor to the schools, as well as to contribute additional cash donations after construction. With the program, millions of dollars were raised by African-American rural communities across the South to fund better education for their children, and white school boards had to agree to operate and maintain the schools. Despite this program, by the mid-1930s white schools in the South had a budget per student more than five times that of black schools; in majority-black Mississippi the ratio was thirteen.

Russell School, Durham, North Carolina

== History ==
After the Civil War, Republicans established public schools and funded colleges and universities as part of their Reconstruction era efforts to rebuild the South. The Freedmen's Bureau partnered with church groups to establish school for African Americans.

Disputes over funding ensued. The Rosenwald-Washington collaboration developed to address the needs of rural students, especially the children of formerly enslaved people.

In the segregated schools of the South, African American children were sent to woefully underfunded schools. The collaboration of Rosenwald and Washington led to the construction of almost 5,000 schools for black children in the eleven states of the former Confederacy as well as Oklahoma, Missouri, Kentucky, and Maryland. As a result of their collaboration, approximately one-third of African American children were educated in these schools.

The Rosenwald-Washington model required the buy-in of African American communities as well as the support of white governing bodies. Black communities raised more than $4.7 million to aid in construction, plus often donating land and labor. Research has found that the Rosenwald program accounts for a sizable portion of the educational gains of rural Southern black persons during this period. This research also found significant effects on school attendance, literacy, years of schooling, cognitive test scores, and Northern migration, with gains highest in the most disadvantaged counties.

== Role of Julius Rosenwald ==
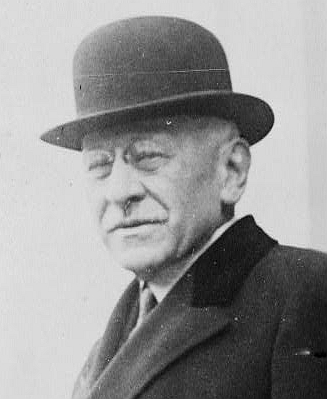
Julius Rosenwald

Julius Rosenwald (1862–1932) was born to a Jewish-German immigrant family. He became a clothier by trade after learning the business from relatives in New York City. His first business went bankrupt, but another he began in Chicago, Illinois, became a leading supplier to the growing business of Richard Warren Sears, Sears, Roebuck, and Company, a mail-order business that served many rural Americans. Anticipating demand by using the variations of sizes in American men and their clothing, determined during the American Civil War, Rosenwald helped plan the growth in what many years later marketers would call "the softer side of Sears": clothing. In 1895, he became one of its investors, eventually serving as the president of Sears from 1908 to 1922. He was its chairman until his death in 1932.

After the 1906 reorganization of the Sears company as a public stock corporation by the financial services firm of Goldman Sachs, one of the senior partners, Paul Sachs, often stayed with the Rosenwald family at their home during his many trips to Chicago. Julius Rosenwald and Sachs often would discuss America's social situation, agreeing that the plight of African Americans was the most serious problem in the United States. The millions in the South had been disenfranchised at the turn of the century and suffered second-class status in a system of Jim Crow segregation. Black public schools and other facilities were chronically underfunded.

== Role of Booker T. Washington ==
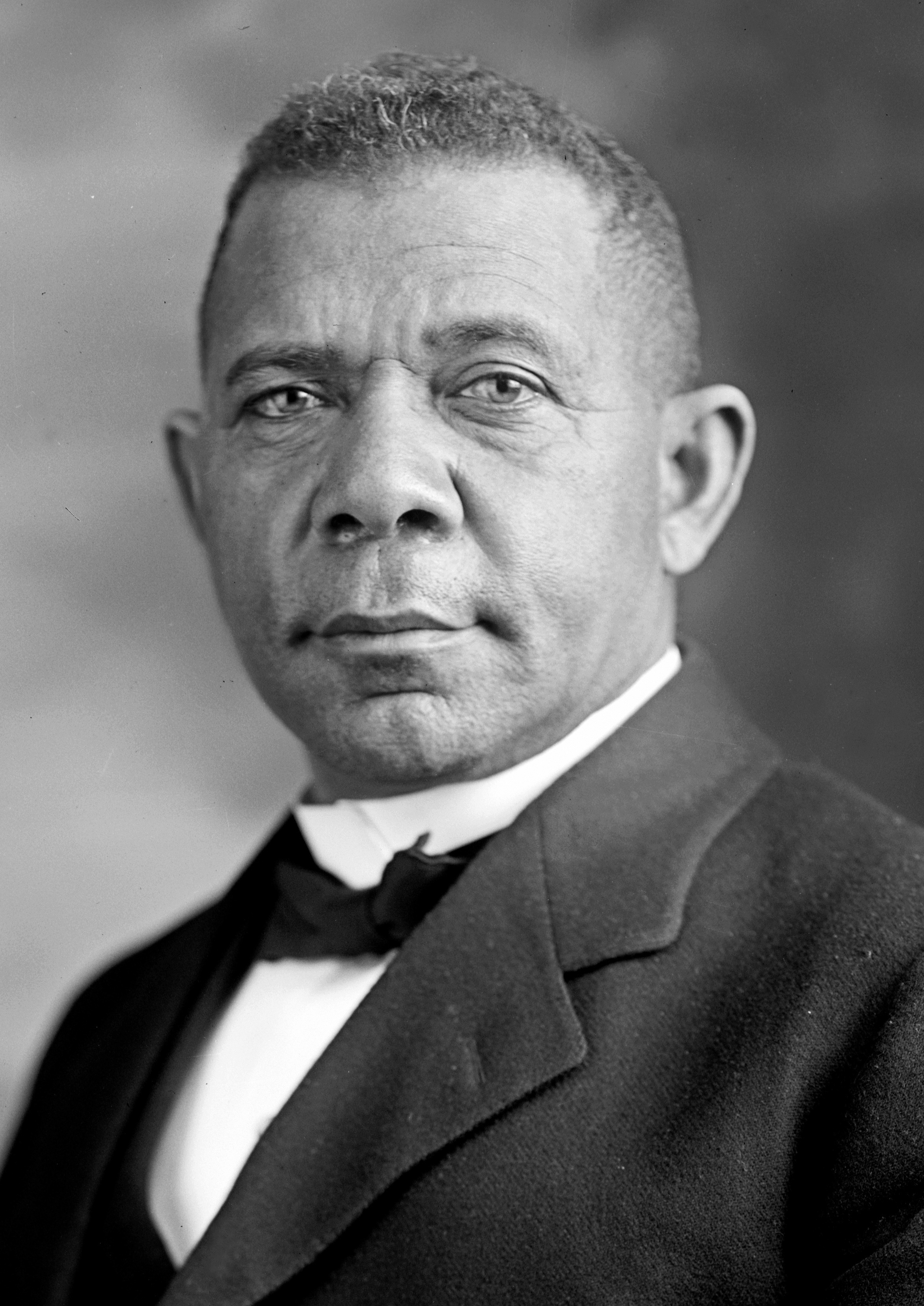
Booker T. Washington

Sachs introduced Rosenwald to Booker T. Washington (1856–1915), the famed educator who in 1881 started as the first principal of the normal school that he developed as Tuskegee University in Alabama. Washington, who had gained the respect of many American leaders including U.S. President Theodore Roosevelt, also had obtained financial support from wealthy philanthropists such as Andrew Carnegie, George Eastman, and Henry Huttleston Rogers. He encouraged Rosenwald, as he had others, to address the poor state of African-American education in the U.S.

In 1912, Rosenwald was asked to serve on the board of directors of Tuskegee, a position he held until his death in 1932. Rosenwald endowed Tuskegee so that Washington could spend less time traveling to seek funding and be able to devote more time toward management of the school. As urged by Washington, Rosenwald provided funds for the construction of six small schools in rural Alabama, which were constructed and opened in 1913 and 1914 and overseen by Tuskegee.

== Rosenwald Fund ==
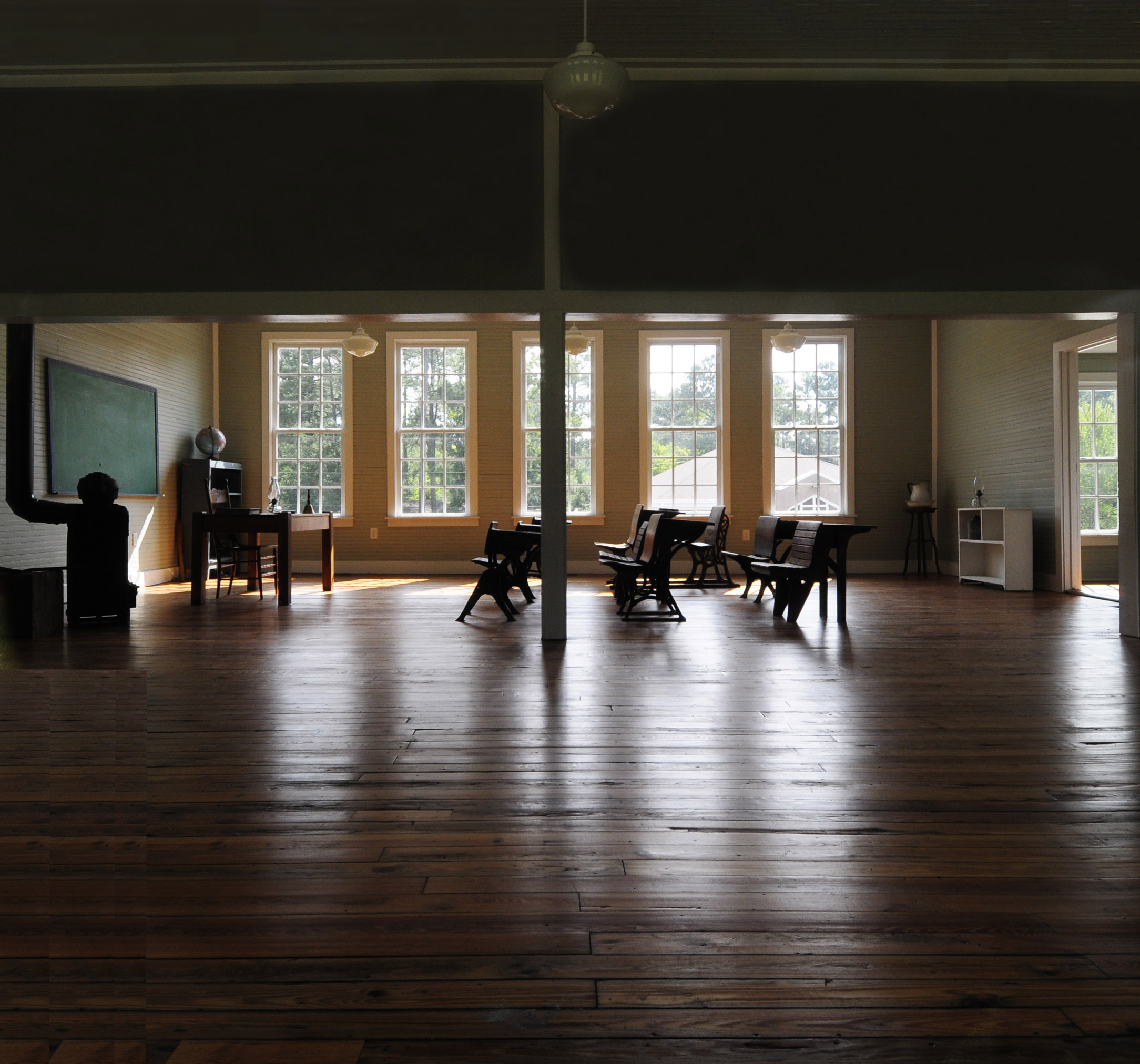
Because many schools were located in areas lacking electricity, the fund designed architectural plans that took advantage of natural light

Julius Rosenwald and his family established the Rosenwald Fund in 1917 for "the well-being of mankind". Unlike other endowed foundations, which were designed to fund themselves in perpetuity, the Rosenwald Fund was intended to use all of its funds for philanthropic purposes. It donated more than $70 million (equivalent to $938,019,000 in 2025) to public schools, colleges, universities, museums, Jewish charities, and black institutions before the funds were depleted in 1948.

The school building program was one of the largest programs administered by the Rosenwald Fund. Using state-of-the-art architectural plans designed by professors at Tuskegee Institute, the fund spent more than $4 million to build 5,388 schools, 217 teacher homes, and 163 shop buildings in 883 counties in 15 states, from Maryland to Texas. The Rosenwald Fund was based on a system of matching grants, requiring white school boards to commit to maintenance and black communities to aid in construction. Fulfilling the goals of the match grant program, African American communities contributed $4.8 million to the building of 5,338 schools throughout the South.

== Notable alumni ==
The following individuals either attended Rosenwald schools or received a Rosenwald Fellowship to complete their education.

- Maya Angelou
- Pauli Murray
- Medgar Evers
- John Lewis
- Eugene Robinson
- Robert L. Carter
- Carlotta Walls LaNier
- Kenneth and Mamie Clark
- John Aubrey Davis Sr.

== Preservation ==
After the Supreme Court's 1954 Brown v. Board of Education decision (which declared school segregation unconstitutional), the buildings were frequently abandoned or dismantled.

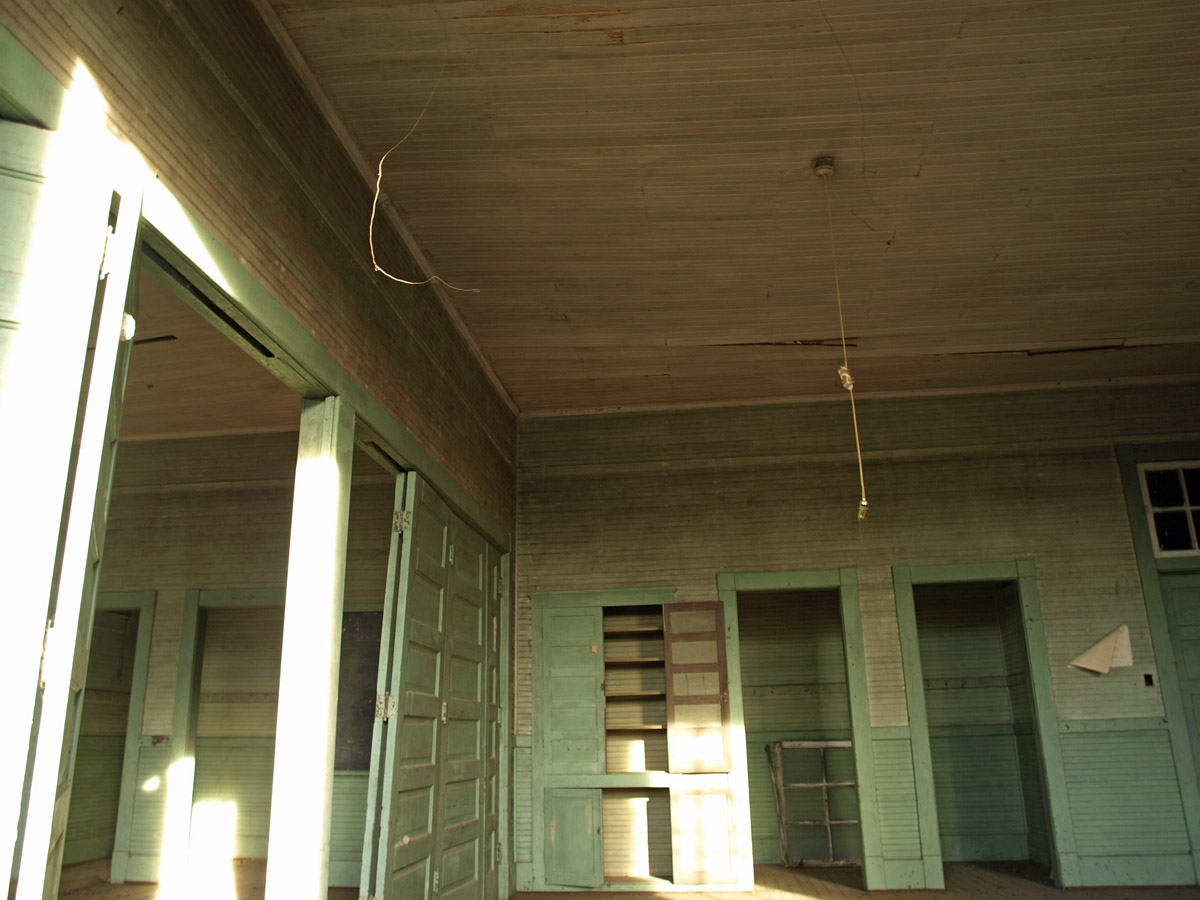
Interior of a Rosenwald School

In some communities, surviving structures have been preserved because of the deep meaning they had for African Americans as symbols of the dedication of their leaders and communities to education. Others were threatened by lack of funds in rural areas, urbanization, changes in demographics, changing styles of education to consolidated and integrated schools, and other social changes.

Former Rosenwald students have led some efforts to preserve Rosenwald Schools. For example, in Georgia, three former Rosenwald Schools were preserved by the efforts of former students and Georgia's Historic Preservation Division, leading to their being listed on the National Register of Historic Places by 2001.

In 2001, the National Trust for Historic Preservation named Rosenwald Schools near the top of the country's most endangered places and created a campaign to raise awareness and money for preservation. At least 60 former Rosenwald Schools are listed on the National Register of Historic Places. In 2015, the National Trust classified the Rosenwald Schools as National Treasures.

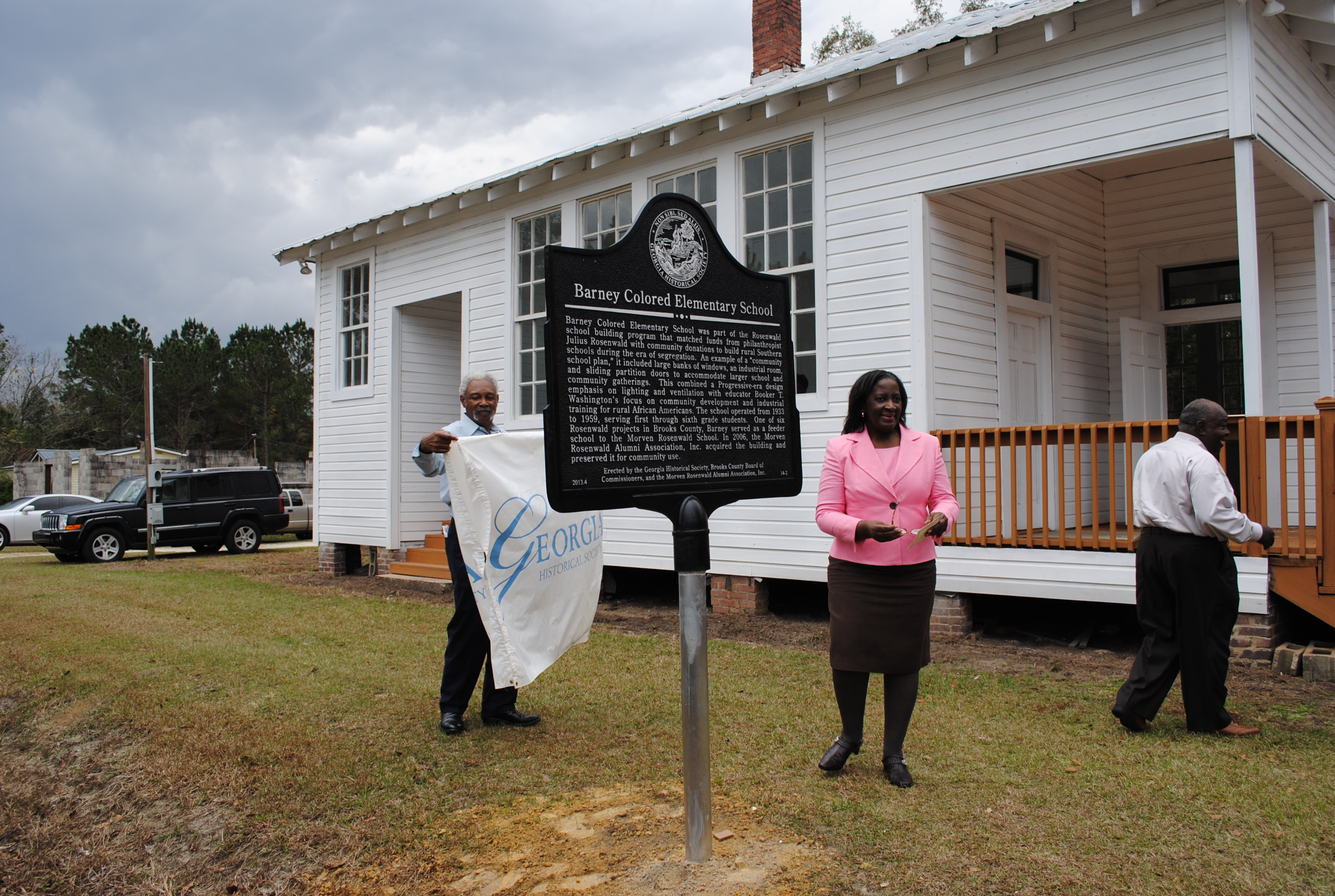
Historical marker dedication for Barney Colored Elementary School in Brooks County, Georgia

In Georgia, several Rosenwald School sites have been commemorated through the Georgia Historical Marker Program, currently administered by the Georgia Historical Society. In partnership with community organizations, markers have been erected for the Hiram Rosenwald School (2006, Paulding County), Macon County Training School (2016, Macon County), Barney Colored Elementary School (2013, Brooks County), and Noble Hill Rosenwald School (1995 by the Georgia Department of Natural Resources, Bartow County).

Some school buildings have been adapted for new uses. Walnut Cove Colored School in Stokes County, North Carolina, won a National Preservation Honor Award for its rehabilitation for use as a senior citizen community center. The Hope Rosenwald School in Pomaria, South Carolina, was to be used as a community center. The Highland Park School in Prince George's County, Maryland, had been in continuous use by the school system; it was later renovated for use as a Headstart Center. The Canetuck Rosenwald School in Currie, North Carolina, has been renovated by the local Black community and is used as a busy community center. The Beauregard Parish Training School in DeRidder, Louisiana, was renovated with a federal grant in 2007 and opened in 2009 as BeauCare Head Start.

In 2012, the National Trust for Historic Preservation, a privately funded nonprofit organization, published a guide to restoring Rosenwald Schools.

In 2022 Congress passed a bill directing the National Park Service to study feasilibility of a national historical park preserving and explaining Rosenwald Schools.

== Effects ==
Researchers measured the effects of Rosenwald Schools on rural southern blacks based on US Census and World War II records, and found that the effect on literacy levels and cognitive scores was large. A 2021 study also found that attending the Rosenwald schools increased the life expectancy of the students, as well as increased their propensity to migrate to the Northern United States.

== See also ==
- Jewish anti-racism
- List of Rosenwald Schools
- Jane Addams
- Grace Abbott
- Emil G. Hirsch
- Julian Mack
- Claudia Stack
- Rosenwald (film)
- Rosenwald Junior College
- History of education in the Southern United States
