= Scouting and Guiding in Uganda =

Scouting and Guiding associations in Uganda

Uganda Scouts Association
- Headquarters: Kampala, Uganda
- Location: Uganda
- Country: Uganda
- Founded: 1915

Scouting and Guiding in Uganda encompasses the activities of the Scout Movement and Girl Guide movement in the Republic of Uganda. The movement was first established during the British colonial period in 1915, making it one of the oldest Scout organizations in East Africa. The Uganda Scouts Association serves as the national scouting organization for boys and young men, while the Uganda Girl Guides Association serves girls and young women. Both organizations are members of their respective world organizations: the World Organization of the Scout Movement (WOSM) and the World Association of Girl Guides and Girl Scouts (WAGGGS).

== History ==
The Scout movement in Uganda began in 1915 when the first Scout troop was established in Kampala by British colonial administrators and missionaries. The movement initially served the European and Indian communities before expanding to include indigenous Ugandan youth in the 1920s. The Uganda Girl Guides Association was established in 1922, following the pattern of Scout development in other British colonies. The organization initially focused on domestic skills and moral education, gradually evolving to include outdoor activities and leadership development. During the independence period in 1962, both organizations underwent significant changes, with leadership gradually transitioning from British expatriates to Ugandan nationals. The movement faced challenges during the turbulent periods of the 1970s and 1980s under Idi Amin and subsequent political instability.

== Organization ==
The Uganda Scouts Association is organized into regional councils covering all districts of Uganda. The organization follows the traditional Scout program structure with Cubs, Scouts, Venture Scouts, and Rover Scouts. Each section has age-appropriate activities and progressive training schemes. The Uganda Girl Guides Association operates through a similar structure with Brownies, Girl Guides, Ranger Guides, and adult leaders. Both organizations emphasize character development, citizenship training, and physical fitness.

== Programs and activities ==
Scouting and Guiding in Uganda incorporates both traditional international programs and locally relevant activities. Environmental conservation has become a major focus, with Scout groups participating in tree planting, wildlife protection, and clean water initiatives. The organizations also emphasize HIV/AIDS awareness, malaria prevention, and other health education programs relevant to Ugandan youth. International exchanges and jamborees provide opportunities for Ugandan Scouts and Guides to interact with peers from other countries.

== Development ==
The organizations have also expanded their focus to include skills training, entrepreneurship education, and peacebuilding activities, making them relevant to Uganda's development needs.

== See also ==
- Scout Movement
- Uganda Scouts Association
- Uganda Girl Guides Association
