= Little White House =

Historic house in Georgia, United States

- U.S. Historic district – Contributing property
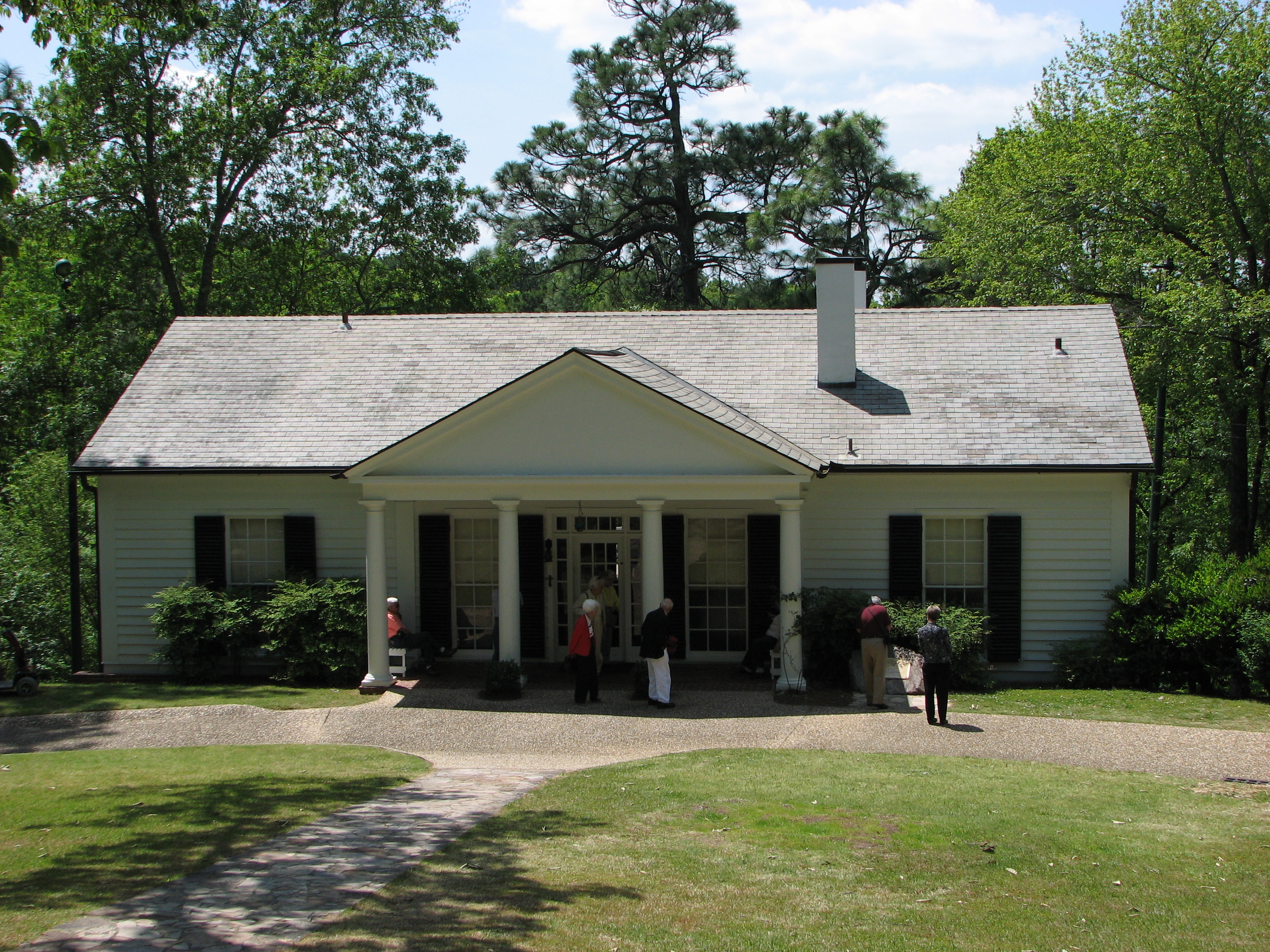

- Location within Georgia Location within the United States
- Interactive map showing the location of the Little White House
- Location: Warm Springs, Georgia
- Coordinates: 32°52′53″N 84°41′15.5″W
- Built: 1932; 94 years ago
- Part of: Warm Springs Historic District (ID74000694)
- Designated CP: July 30, 1974

The Little White House was the personal retreat of Franklin D. Roosevelt, the 32nd president of the United States, located in the Historic District of Warm Springs, Georgia. He first came to Warm Springs (formerly known as Bullochville) in 1924 for polio treatment, and liked the area so much that, as Governor of New York, he had a home built on nearby Pine Mountain. The house was finished in 1932. Roosevelt kept the house after he became president, using it as a presidential retreat. He died there on April 12, 1945, three months into his fourth term.

The house was opened to the public as a museum in 1948. A major attraction of the museum is the portrait that the artist Elizabeth Shoumatoff was painting of him when he died, now known as the "Unfinished Portrait". It hangs near a finished portrait that Shoumatoff completed later from sketches and memory.

The house is operated by the State of Georgia as the Little White House Historic Site, also known as Roosevelt's Little White House Historic Site.

== History ==
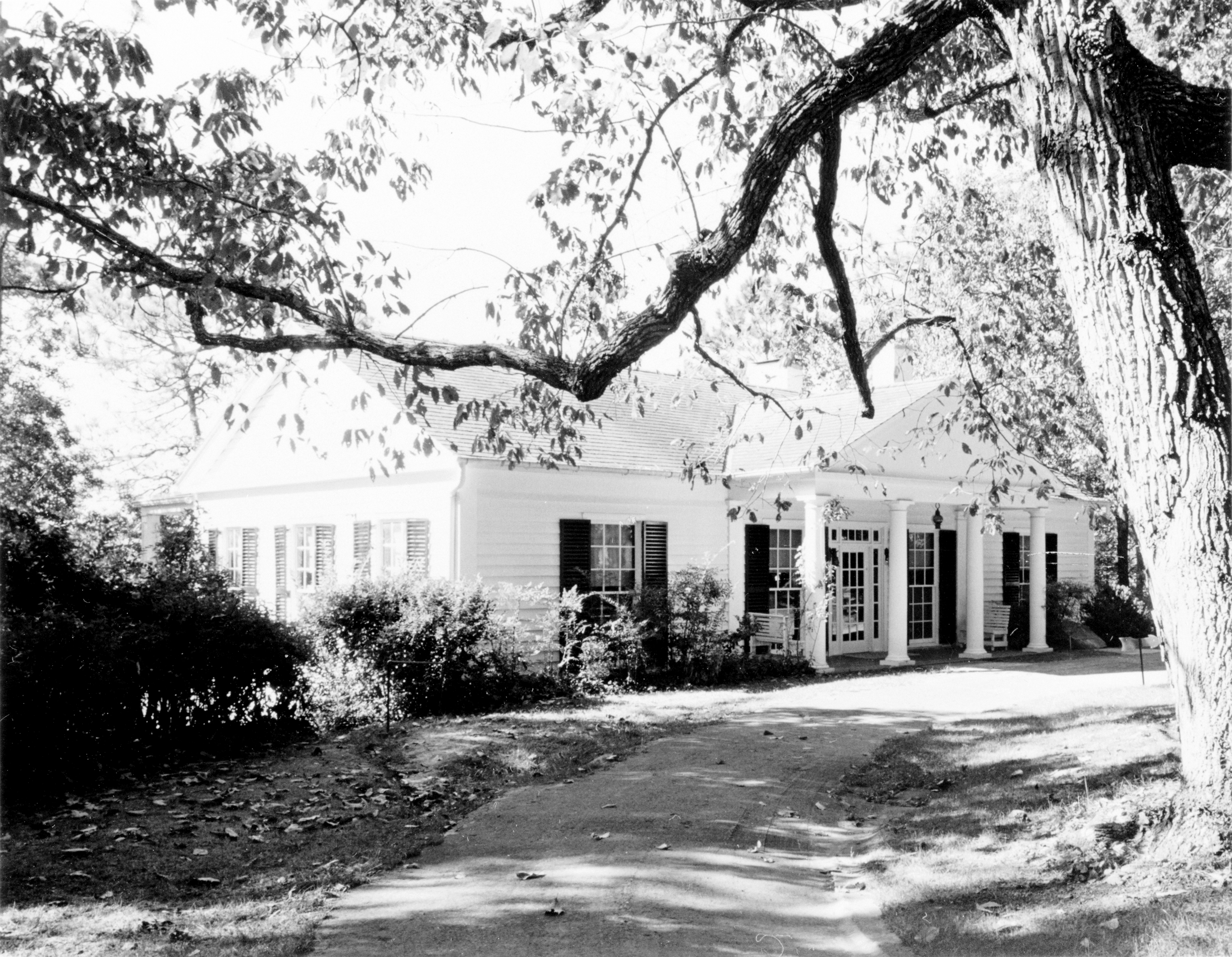
Historic American Buildings Survey photograph of the Little White House

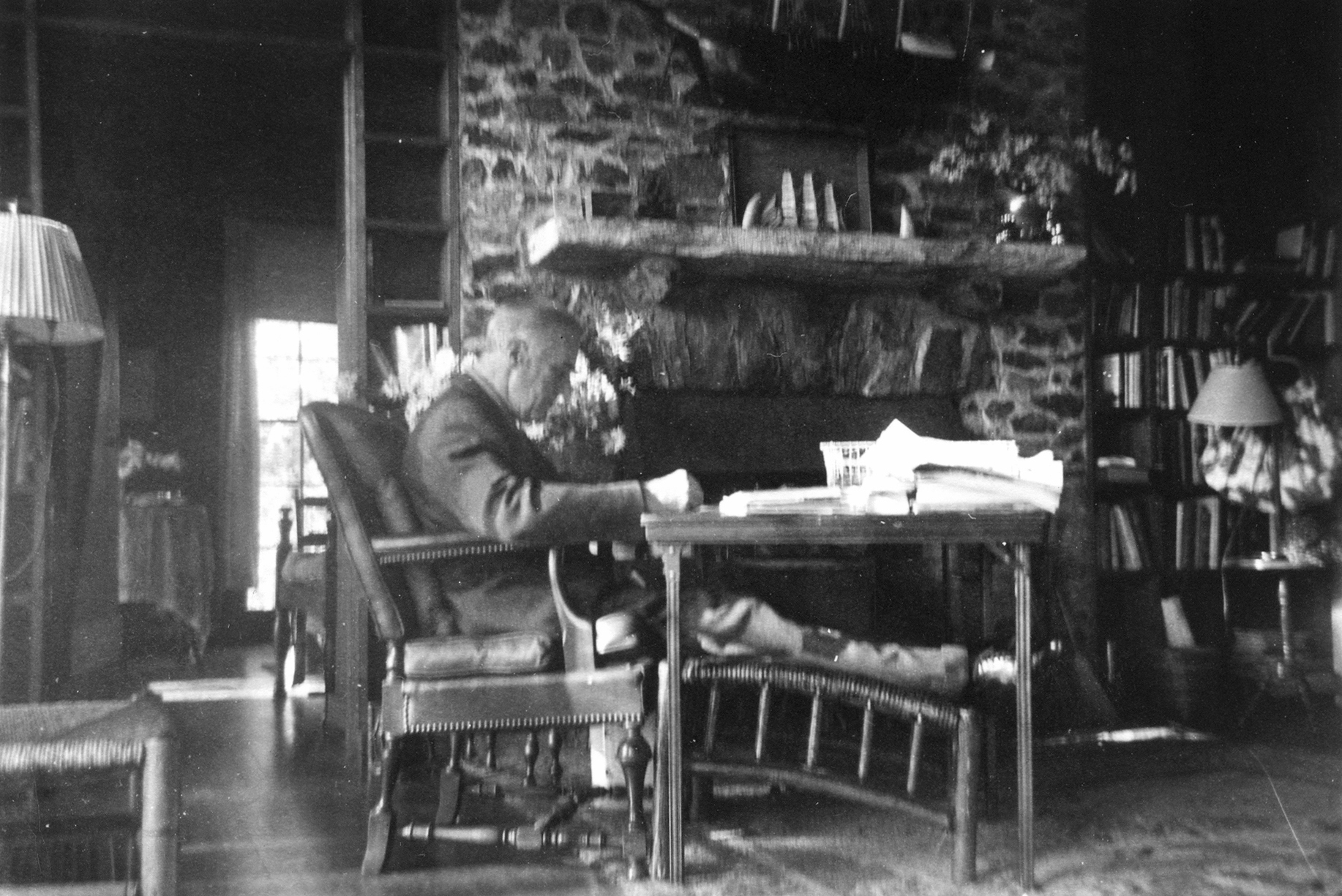
FDR at the Little White House a few days before his death (April 1945)

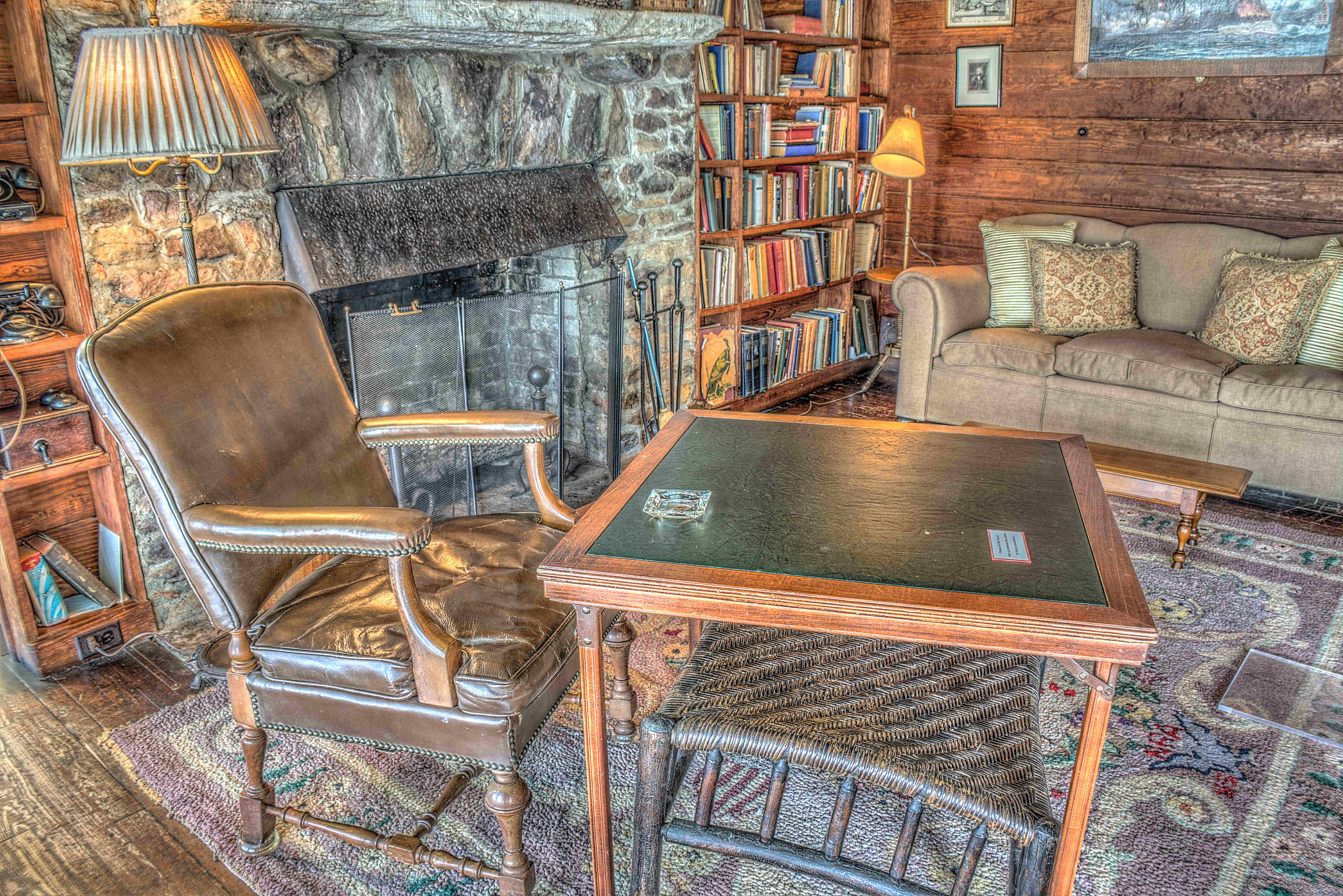
Roosevelt's chair near the fireplace (2017)

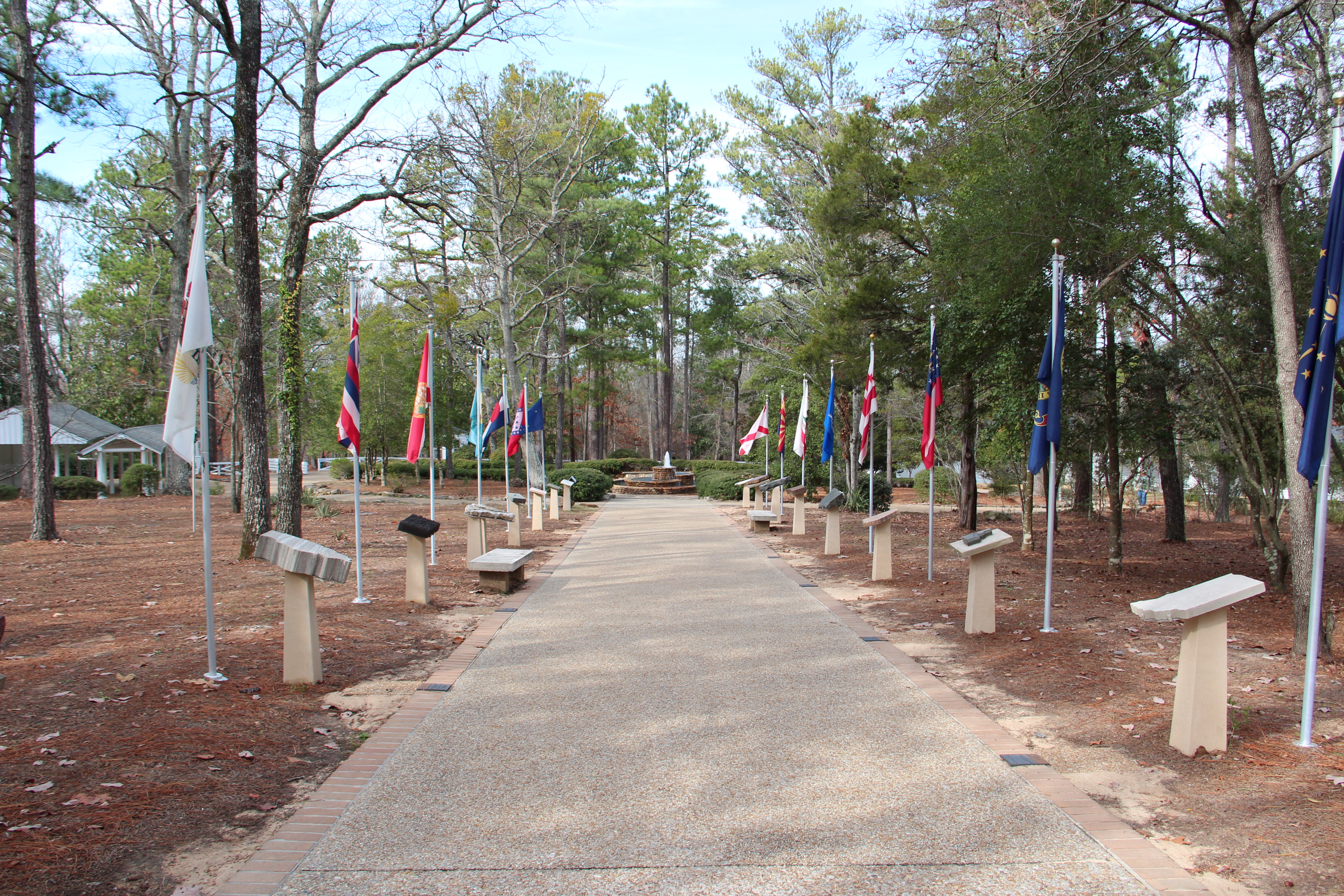
Walk of Flags and Stones

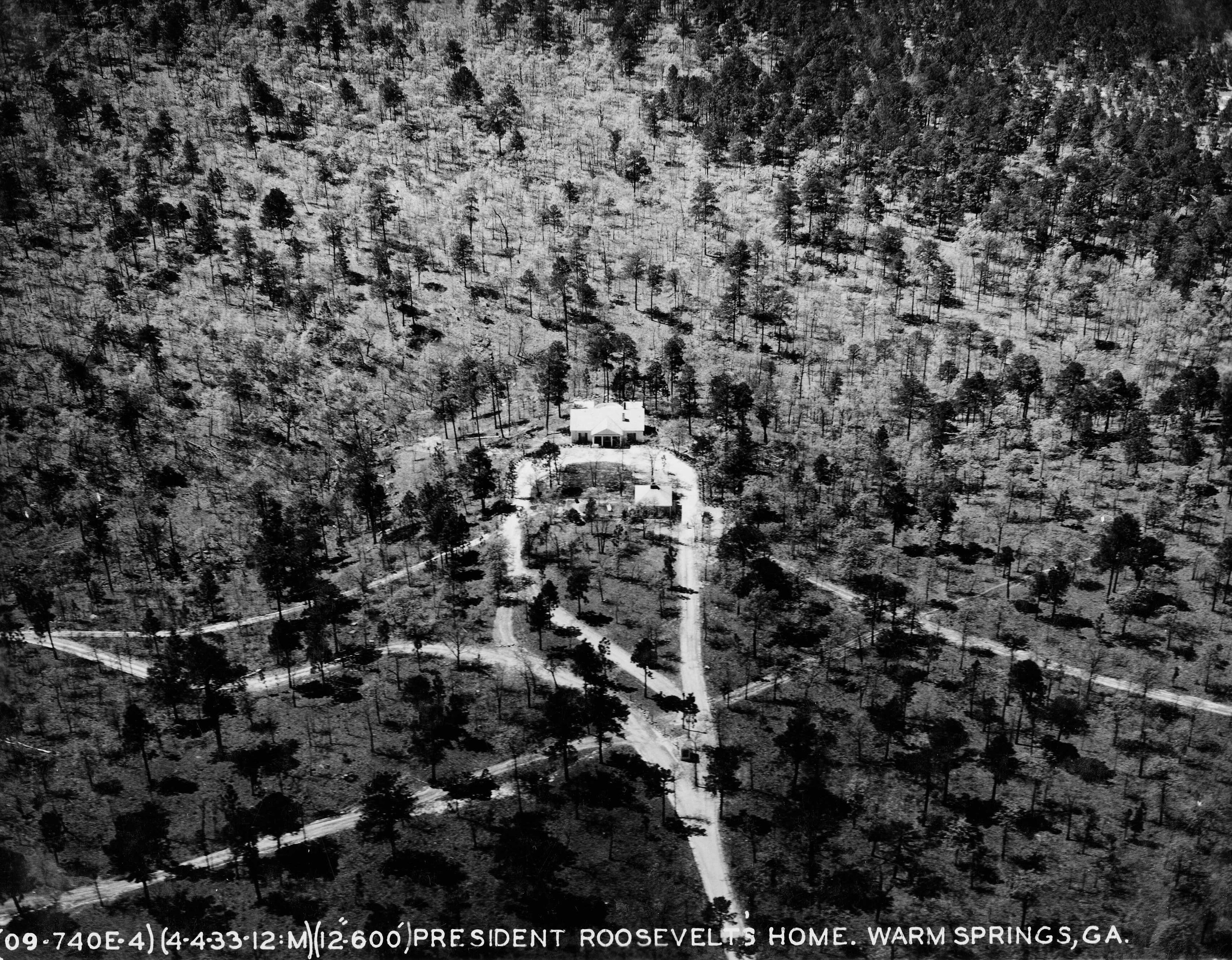
Little White House, 1933

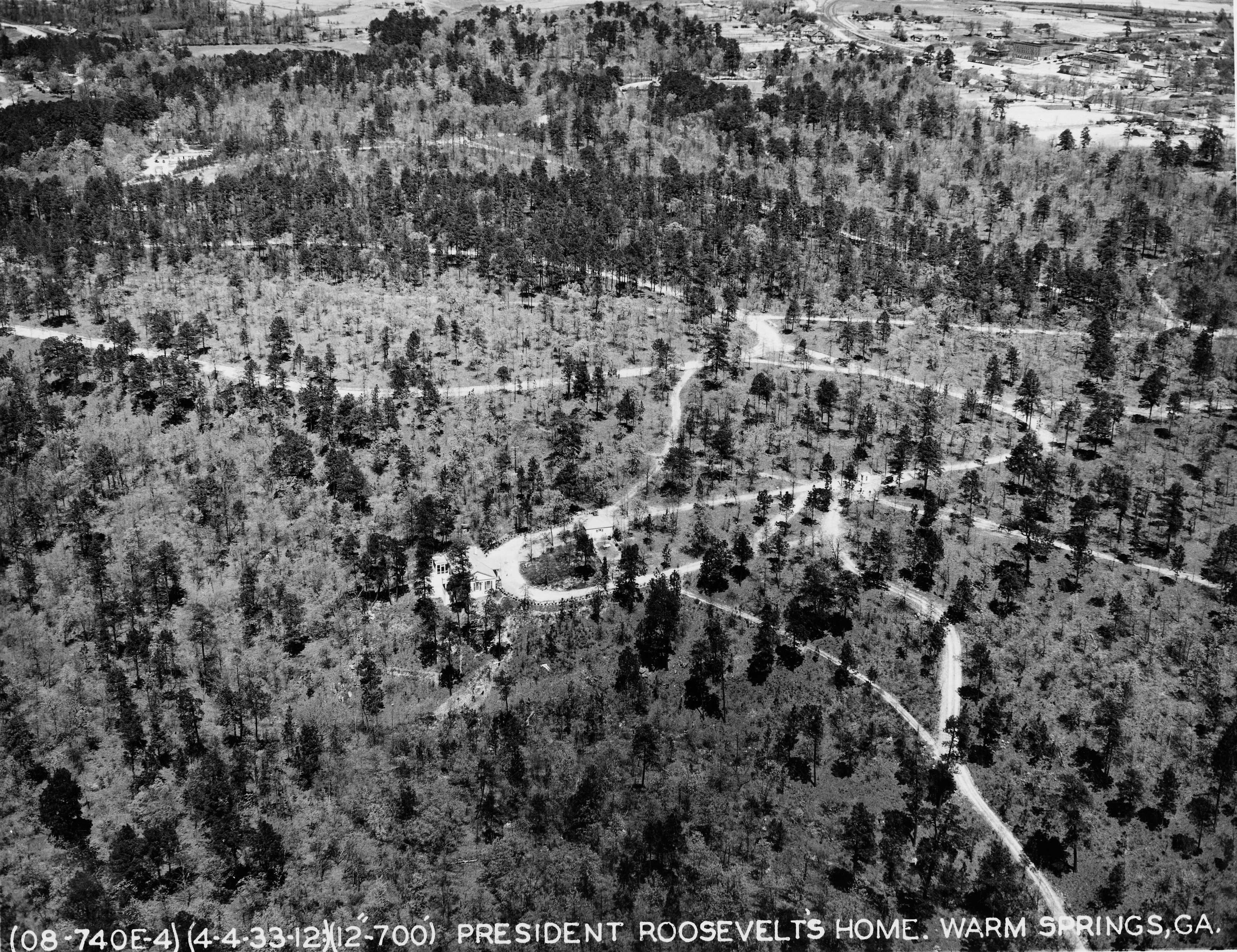
Little White House, 1933

Residents of Georgia, particularly Savannah, began spending vacations at Bullochville in the late 18th century as a way to escape yellow fever, attracted by the number of warm springs in the vicinity. In the late 19th century, traveling to the warm springs was a desirable way to escape from Atlanta. Traveling by railroad to Durand, people would then go to Bullochville. One of the places benefiting from this was the Meriwether Inn. Once the automobile became popular in the early 20th century, tourists began going elsewhere, starting the decline of the inn.

In 1921, Roosevelt, aged 39, was diagnosed with poliomyelitis. The few things that seemed to ease his pain were immersion in warm water, bathing and engaging in physical exercise. His first time in Warm Springs was October 1924. He went to a resort in the town that had a permanent 88 °F (31 °C) natural spring, but whose main house was described as "ramshackle." Roosevelt bought the resort and the 1,700-acre (6.9 km^{2}) farm surrounding it in 1927 (the resort became known as the Roosevelt Warm Springs Institute for Rehabilitation). Five years later, in 1932, after winning the presidency for the first time, he ordered a six-room Georgia pine house to be built on the property. This house was his retreat throughout his presidency and became known as the Little White House. In total, he made 16 trips there during his presidency, usually spending two to three weeks at a time, as it took a day to reach Warm Springs from Washington, D.C. by train.

The Little White House is a six-room Colonial Revival structure made of Georgia pine. Three of the rooms were bedrooms: one for Roosevelt, one for his wife Eleanor, and one for his personal secretary. The other rooms were an entrance hall, a living room and a kitchen. Access to the Little White House was from an unpaved road that now only exists in parts. The garage-servant's quarters was built in 1932, followed by the single-story frame cottage that served as a guesthouse in 1933, and finally a cottage for Georgia Wilkins in 1934. Wilkins' family were the original owners of the property.

Roosevelt used the Little White House as a base to replace Georgia politicians who refused to follow his policies. This was most notable in 1938 when Roosevelt tried and failed to have United States Senator Walter George replaced with a Roosevelt loyalist, even though both were Democrats.

World War II affected Roosevelt's time at the Little White House. The only year he did not go to the Little White House was 1942, as he was preoccupied by the beginnings of US involvement in the war. It is believed that he vacationed as much as he did in 1943–45 at the Little White House because his real love for vacations, sailing on the Atlantic, was too dangerous during wartime, even if it was just on inland waterways like the Chesapeake Bay or the Potomac River. One major change was that soldiers from Fort Benning were stationed at the Little White House to patrol the woods surrounding the farm.

His last trip to the Little White House was on March 30, 1945. He felt he did not achieve enough rest at his Hyde Park home. According to some observers at Warm Springs, Roosevelt looked "ghastly" and his usual cordial waves to the residents were weak. Unlike his previous visits, he avoided the swimming pool he used to comfort himself in previous trips. On April 12, 1945, he was sitting for a portrait at the Little White House when he suffered a stroke. Roosevelt died two hours later of cerebral hemorrhage.

Most of Roosevelt's property was willed to Georgia Warm Springs Foundation, which gained control of all the properties in 1948 except for the Georgia Wilkins Cottage, which Wilkins lived in until her 1959 death. Both John F. Kennedy in 1960 and Jimmy Carter in 1976 used the property for their campaigns to become president; Carter even launched his campaign there.

== Current status ==
Today, the Little White House is part of Georgia's state park system and is open to visitors. It has been preserved and is as it was the day Roosevelt died. All buildings and furnishings are original to the house and property. Items on display, besides the Unfinished Portrait, include his customized 1938 Ford convertible and his stagecoach.

On August 9, 2011, the McCarthy Cottage and the E.T. Curtis Cottage on the Roosevelt Institute Hospital grounds that date back to Roosevelt's time at Warm Springs were destroyed in a fire which investigators believed had been started by lightning and thunderstorms that were in the area at the time.

== Gallery ==
=== The Little White House ===
FDR's home with rebuilt Guesthouse and servant quarters in 2014.

Floor plan

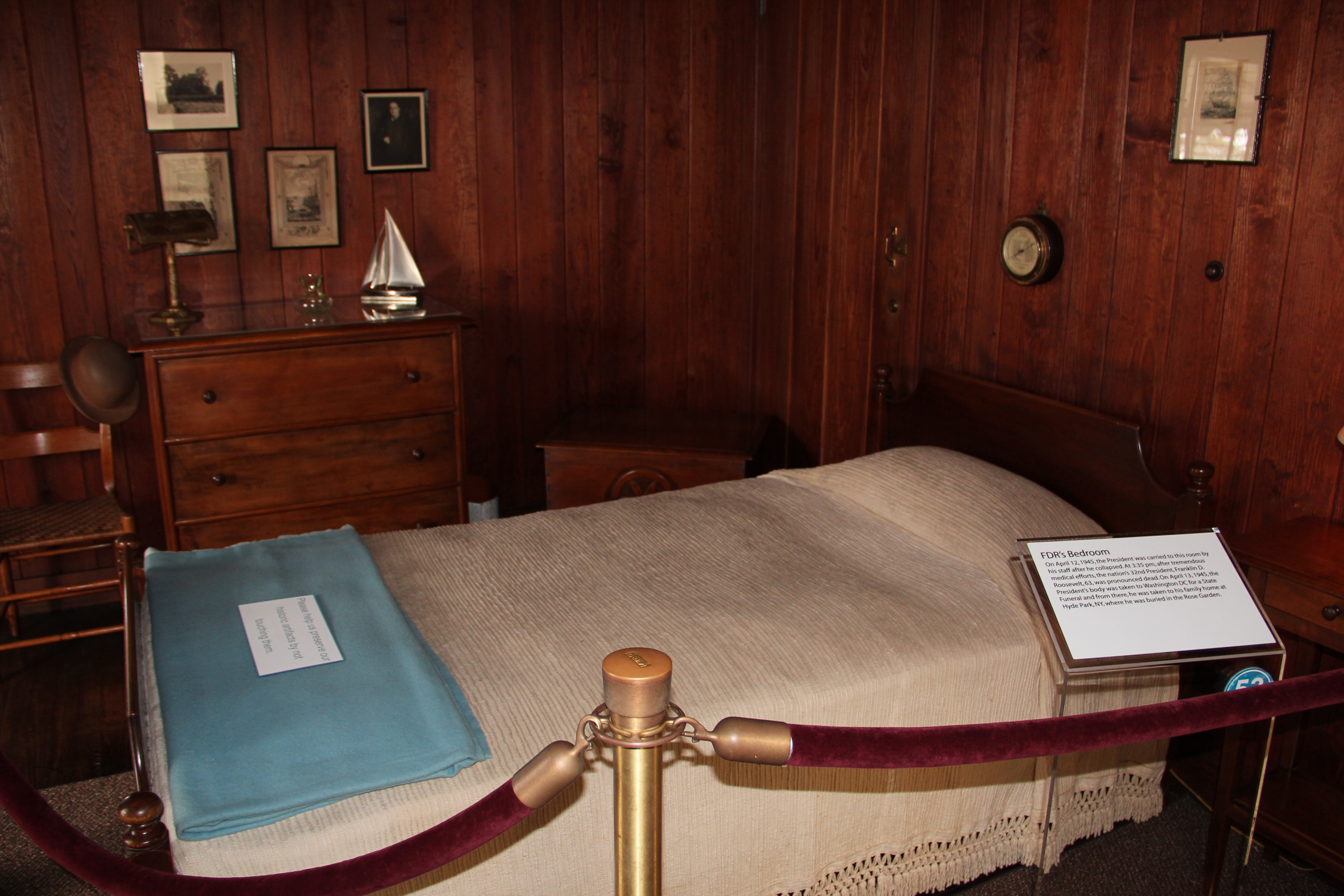
Bedroom where Roosevelt died

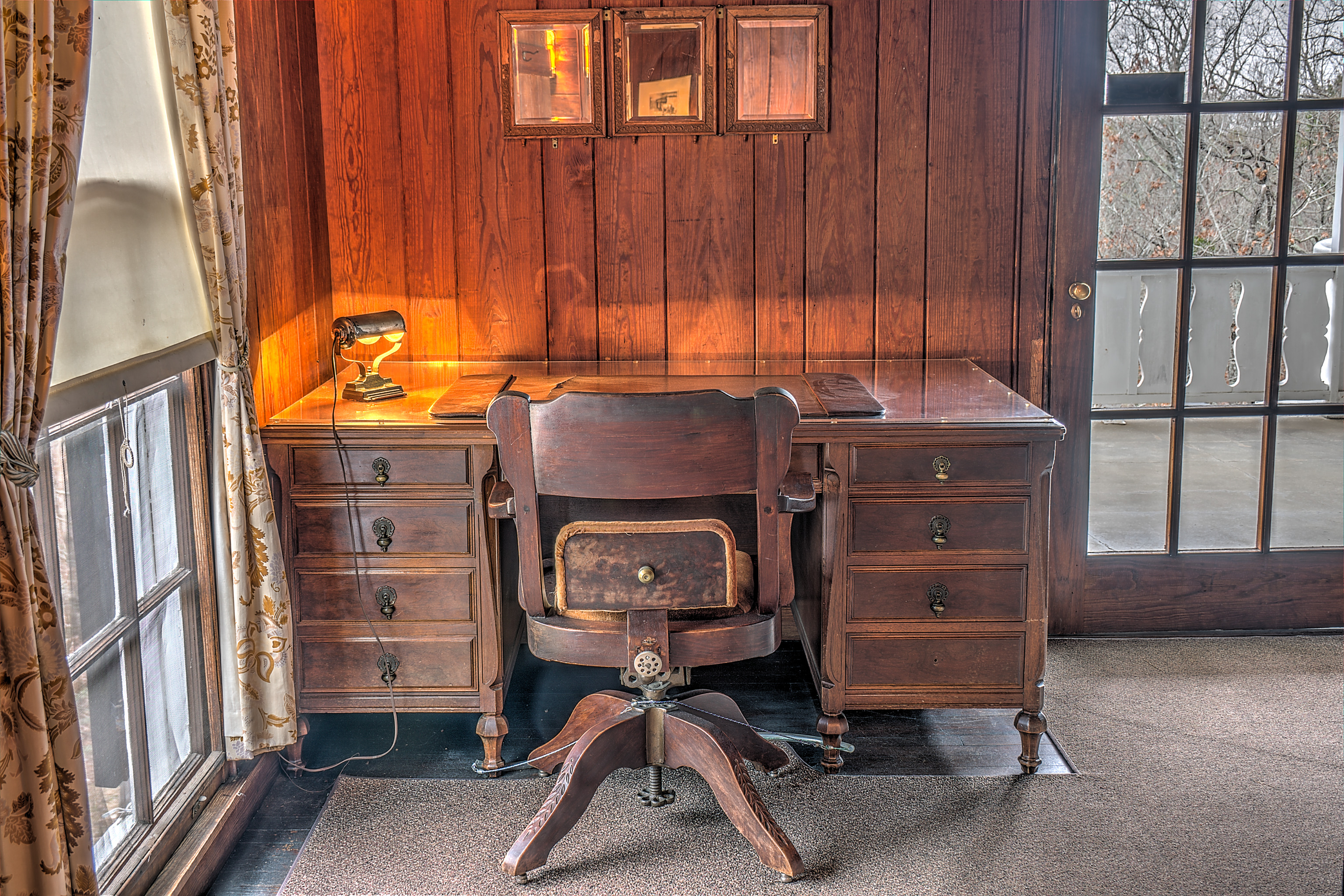
The President's Desk

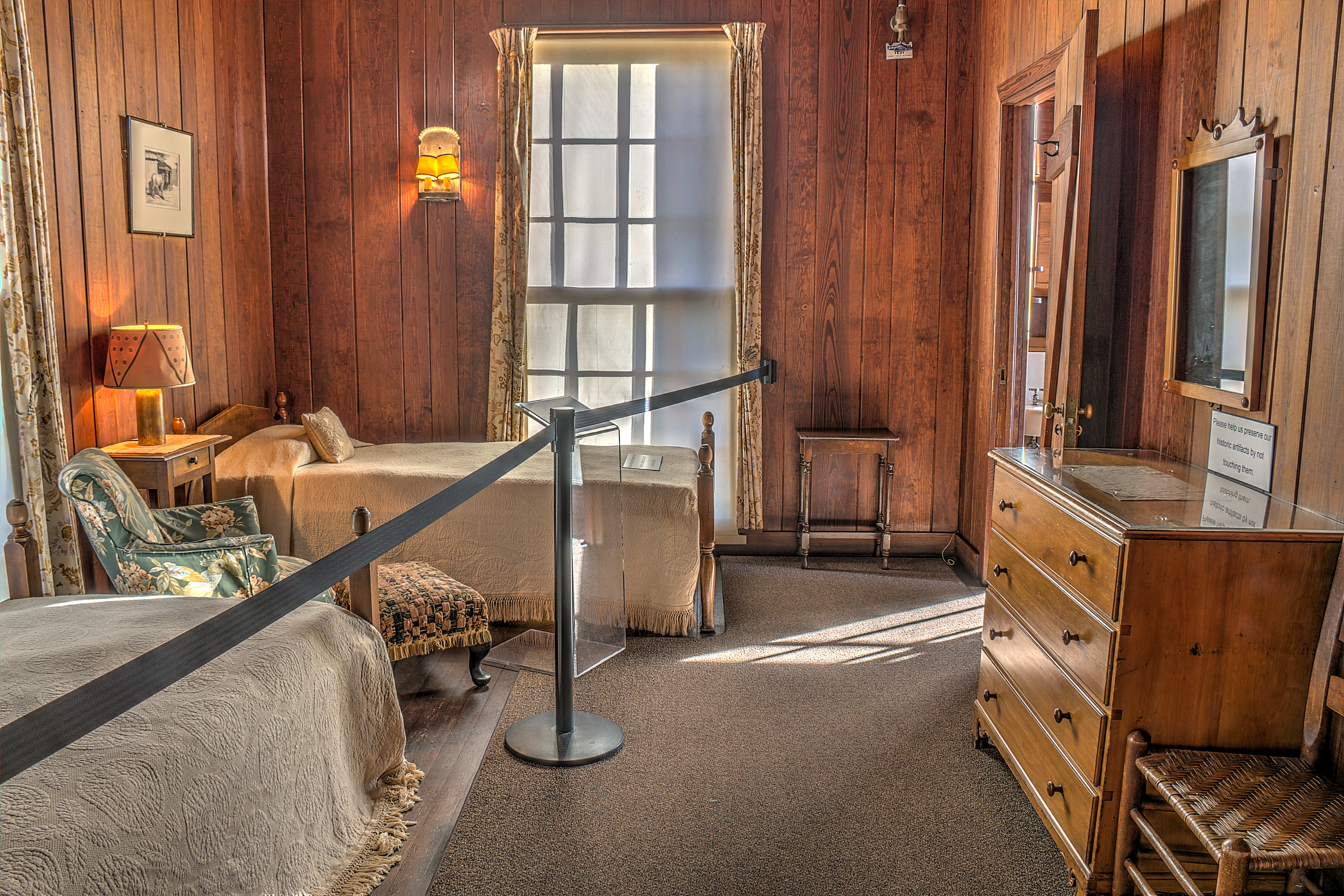
Eleanor Roosevelt's Bedroom

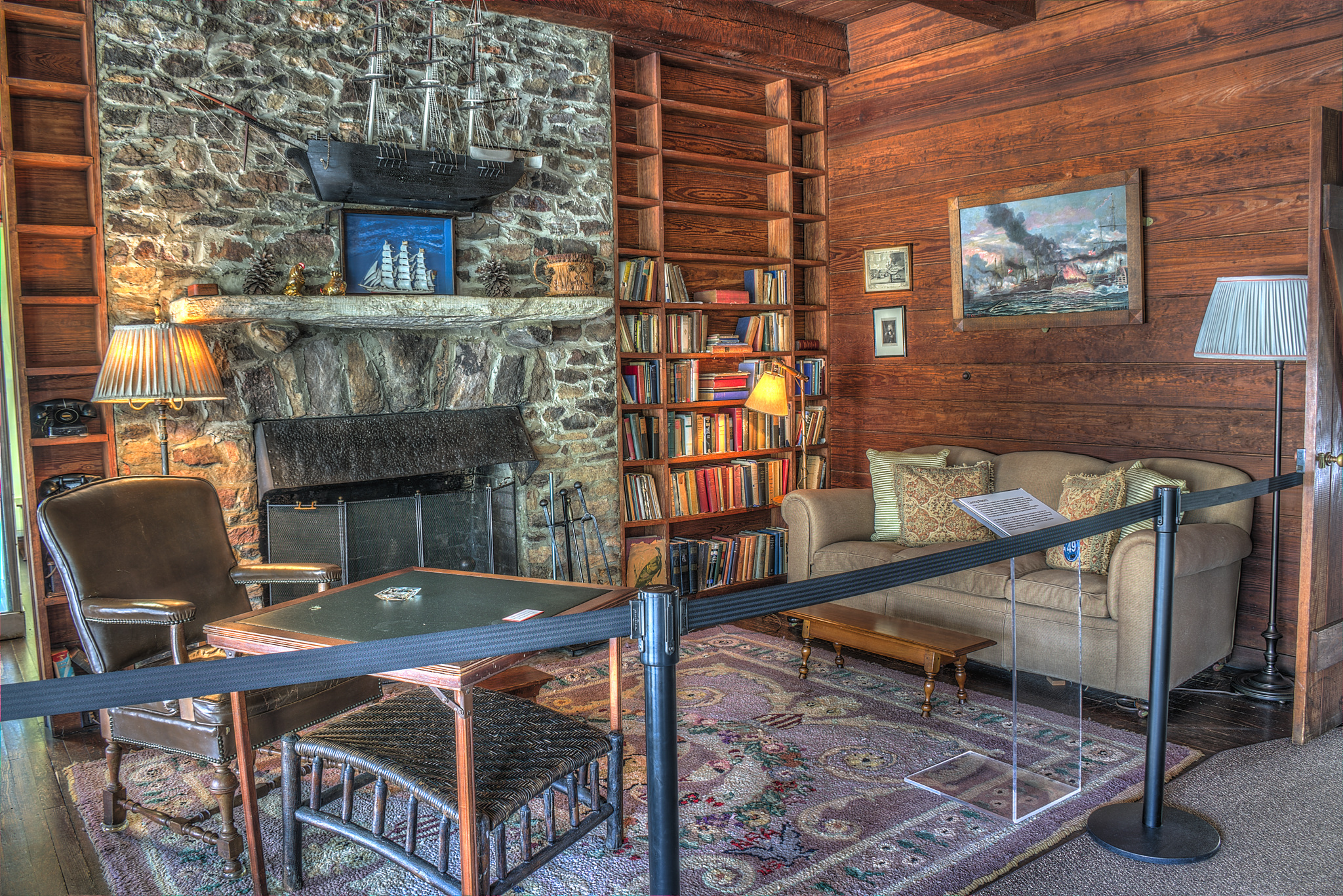
Living Room

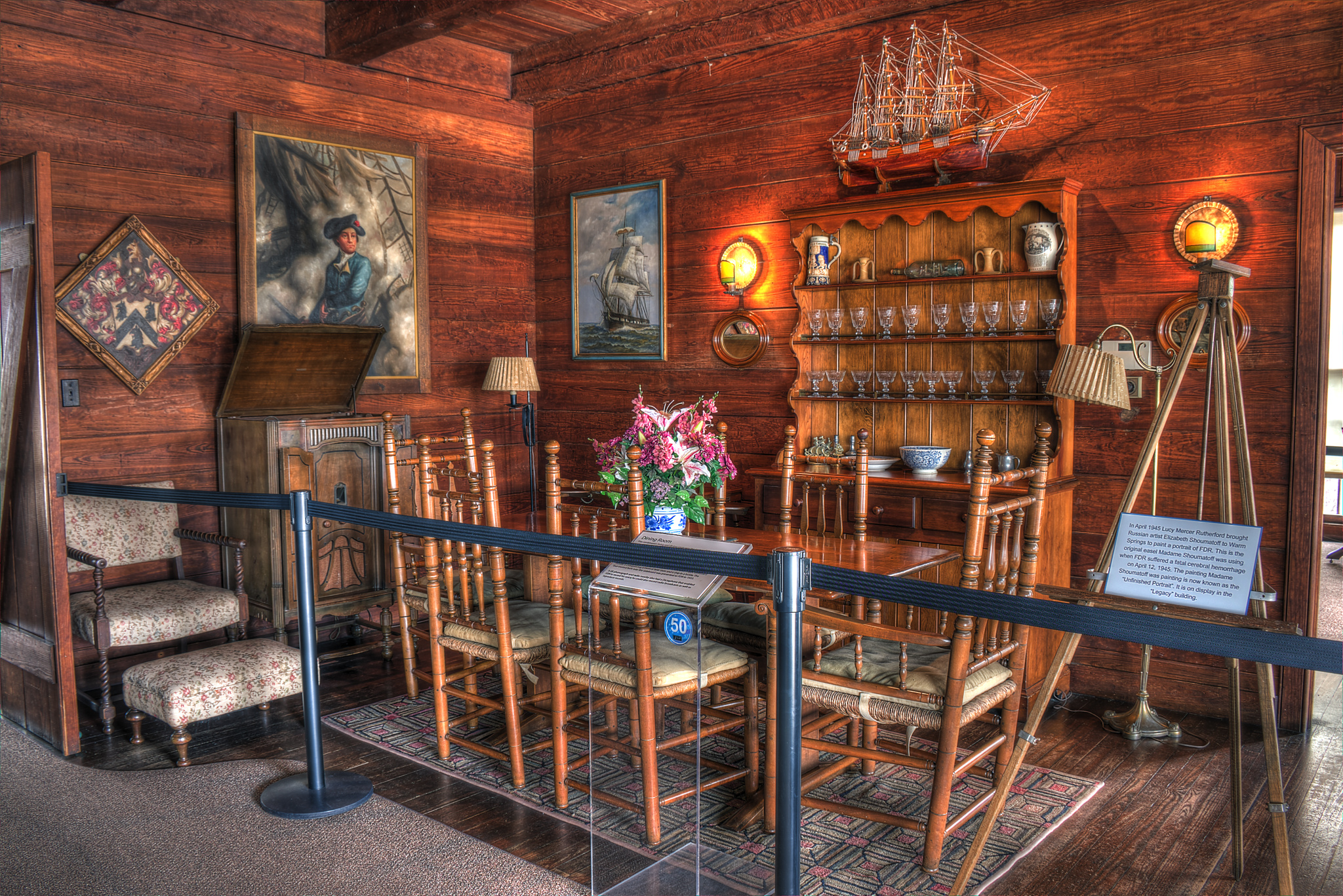
Dining Room

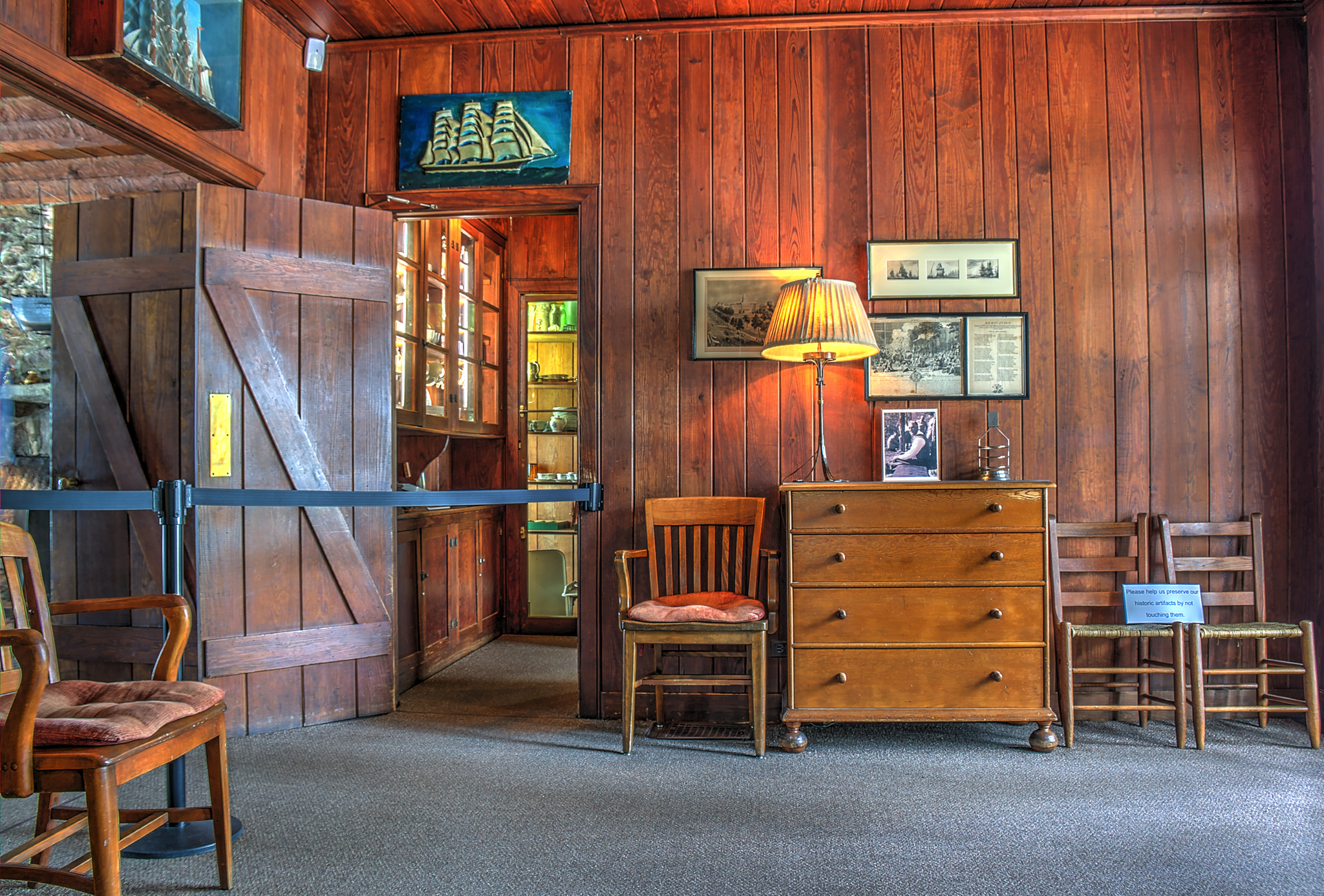
Entrance Hall

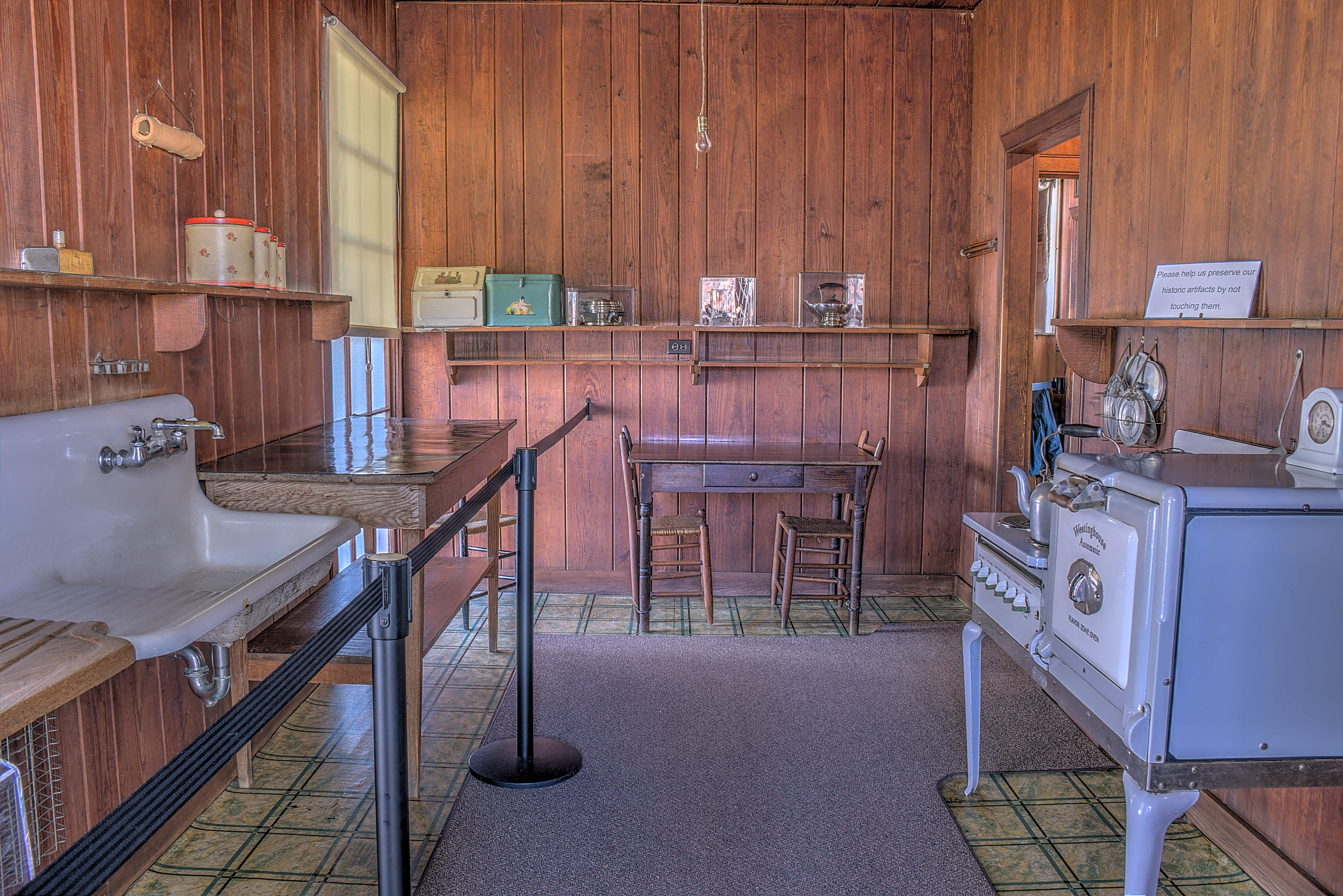
Kitchen

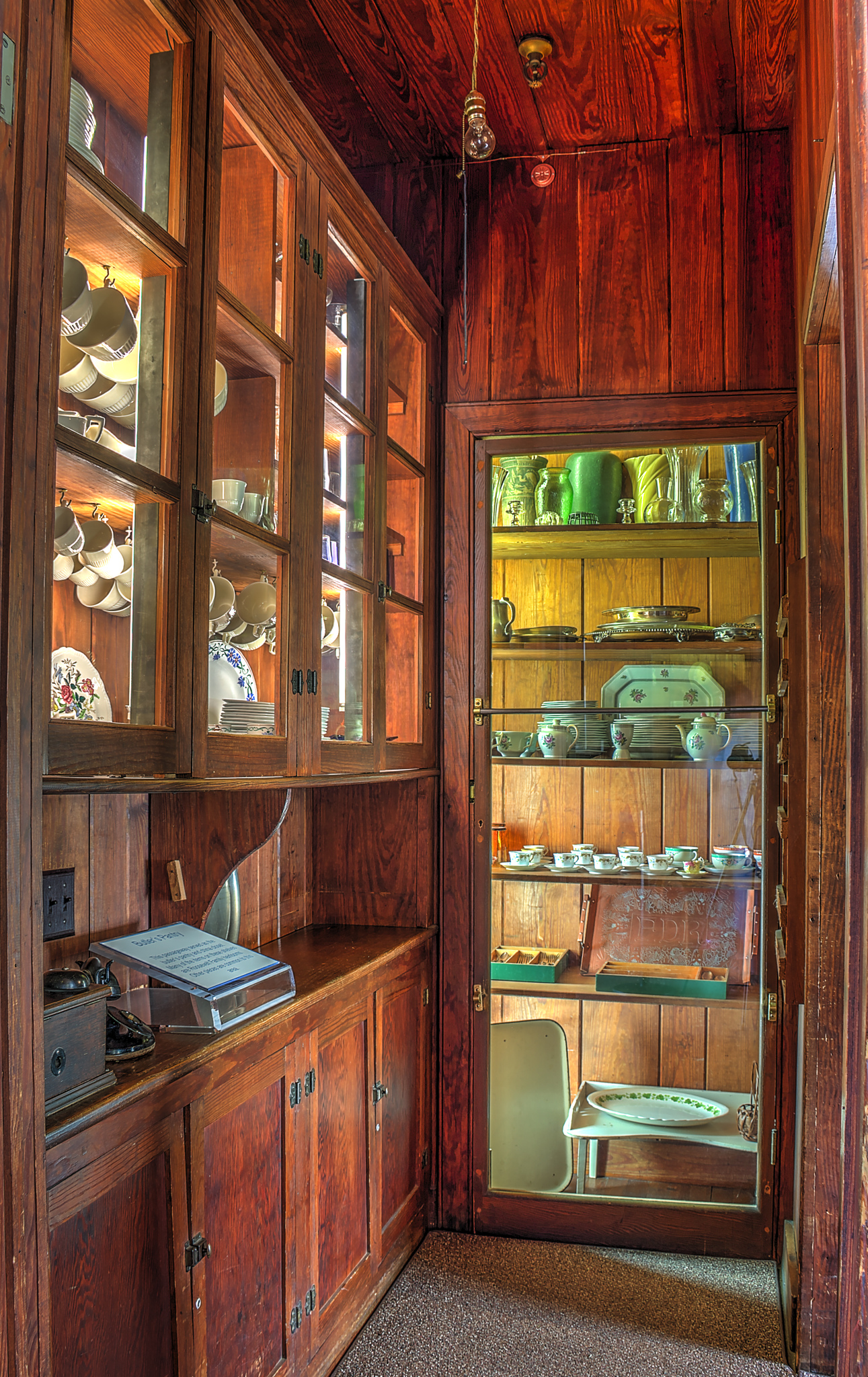
Butler's Pantry

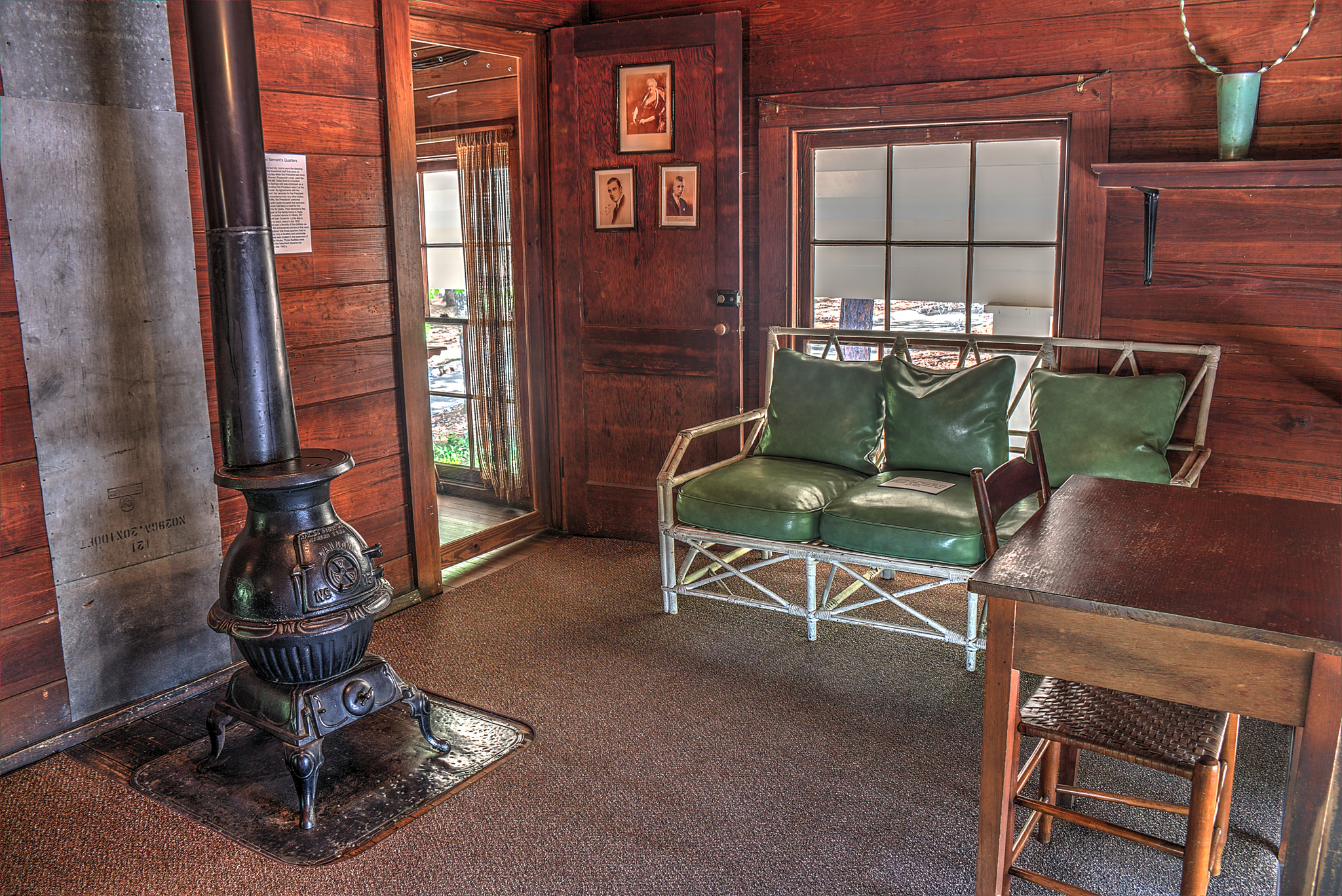
Servants' Quarters

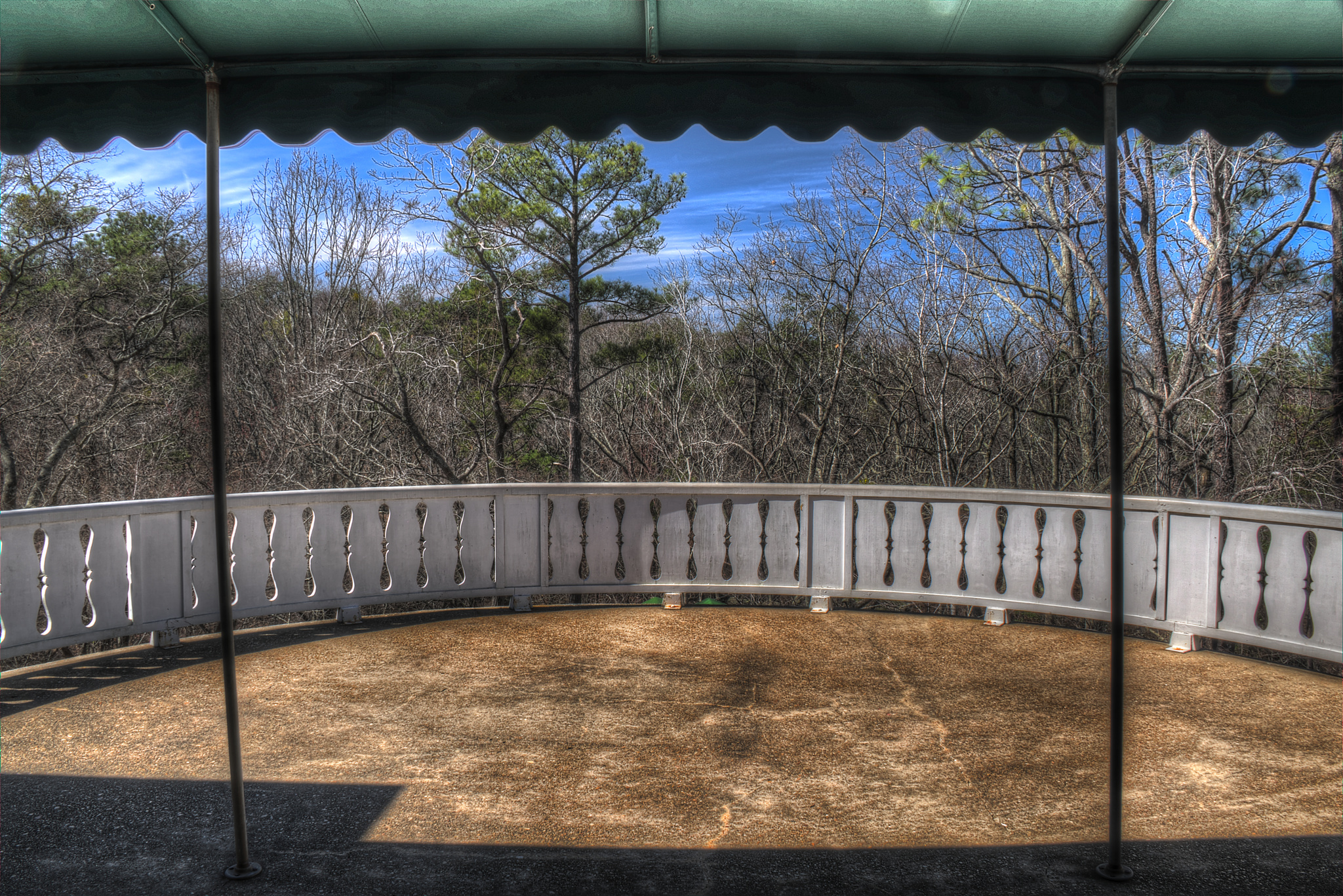
Sun Deck

=== Memorial Museum ===
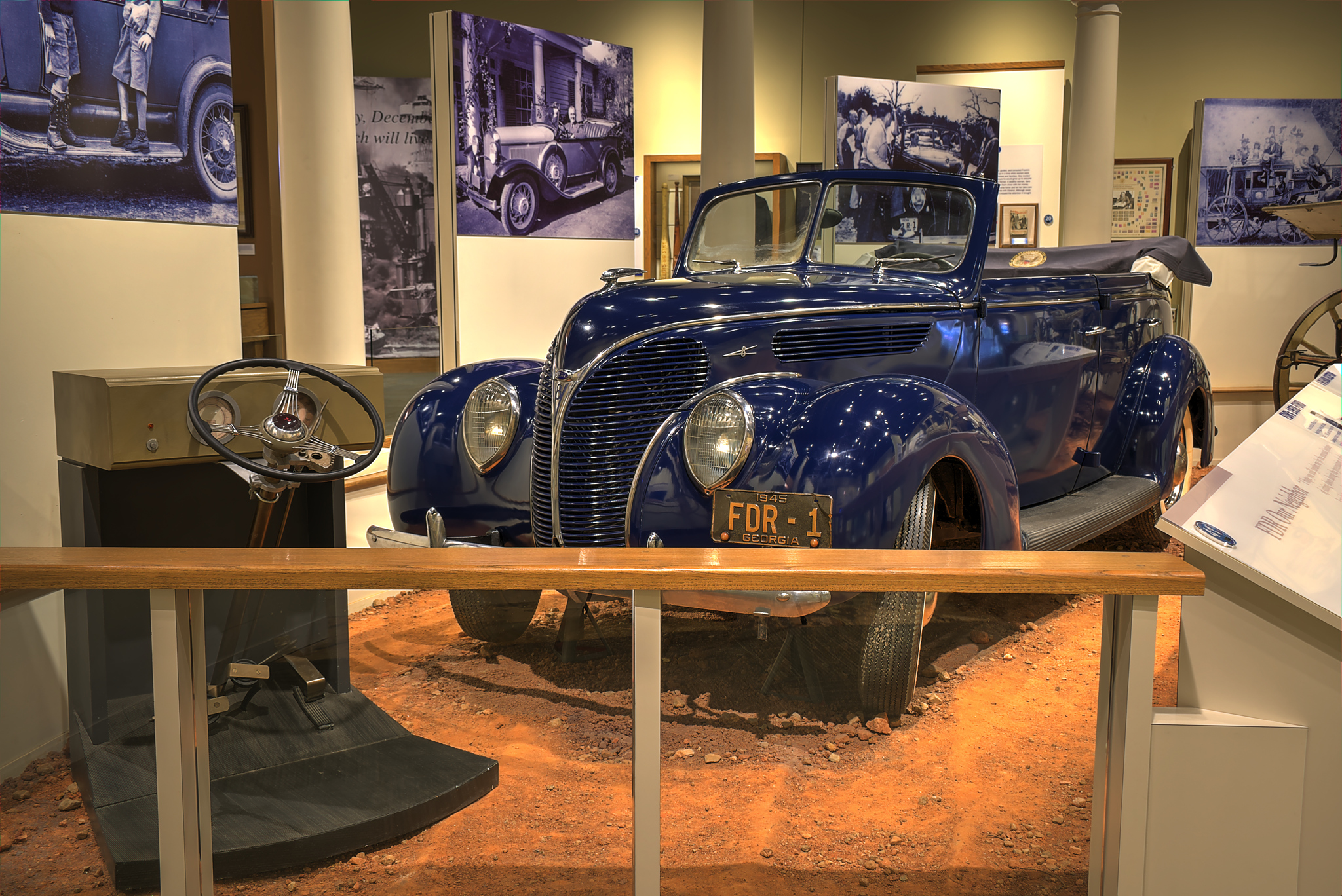
FDR's 1938 Ford

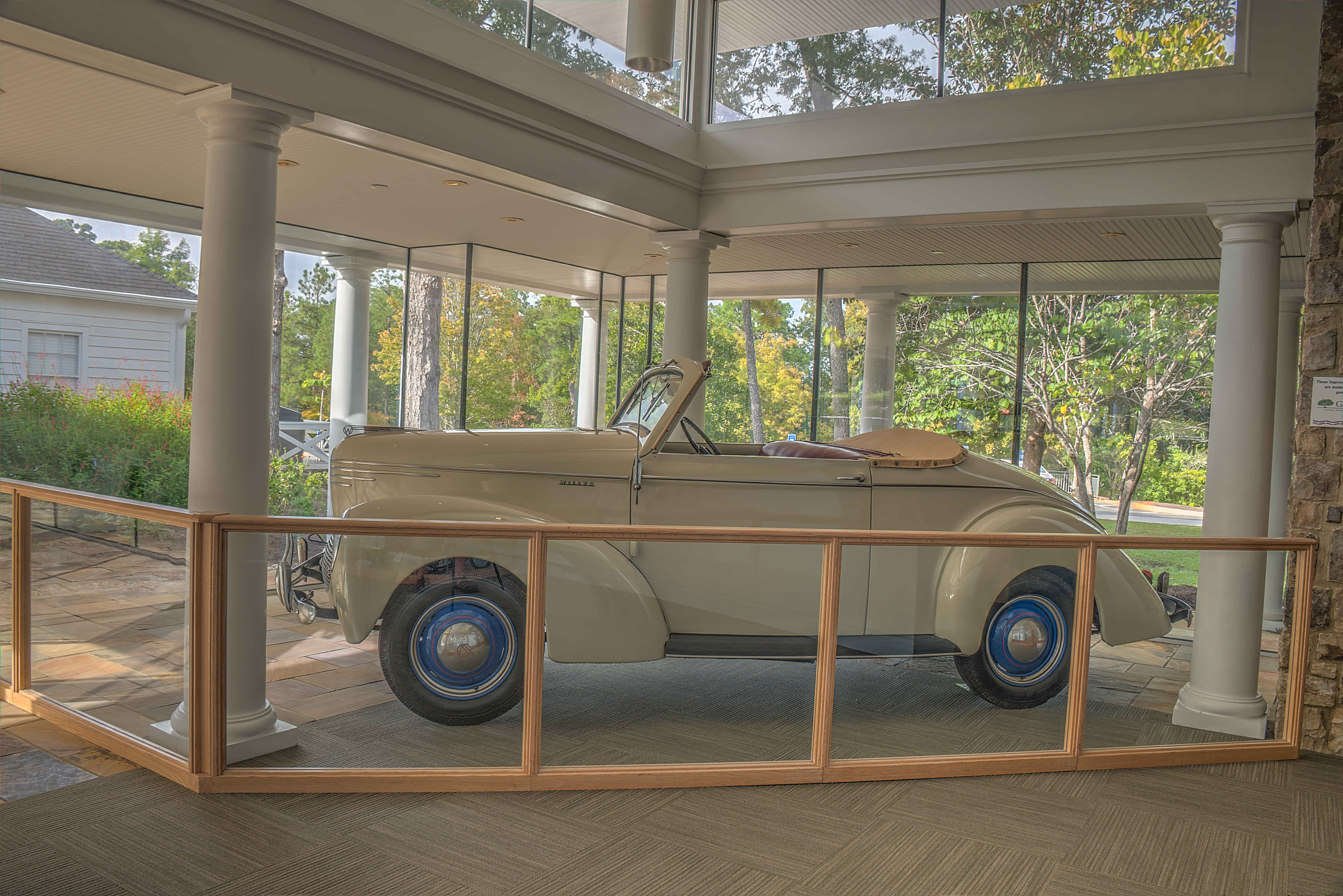
Custom built 1940 Willys roadster

=== Warm Springs Pools ===
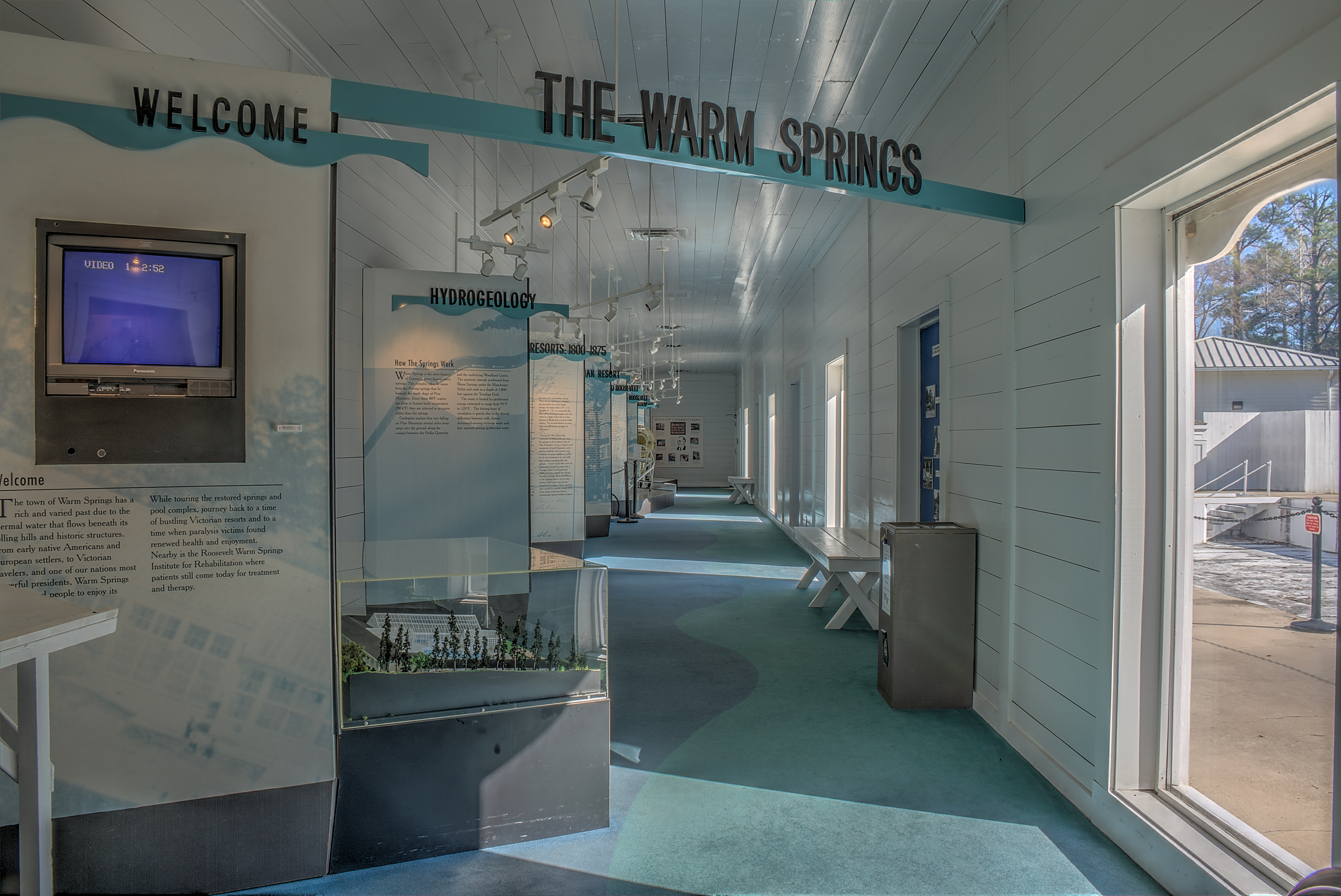
Historic Pools Museum

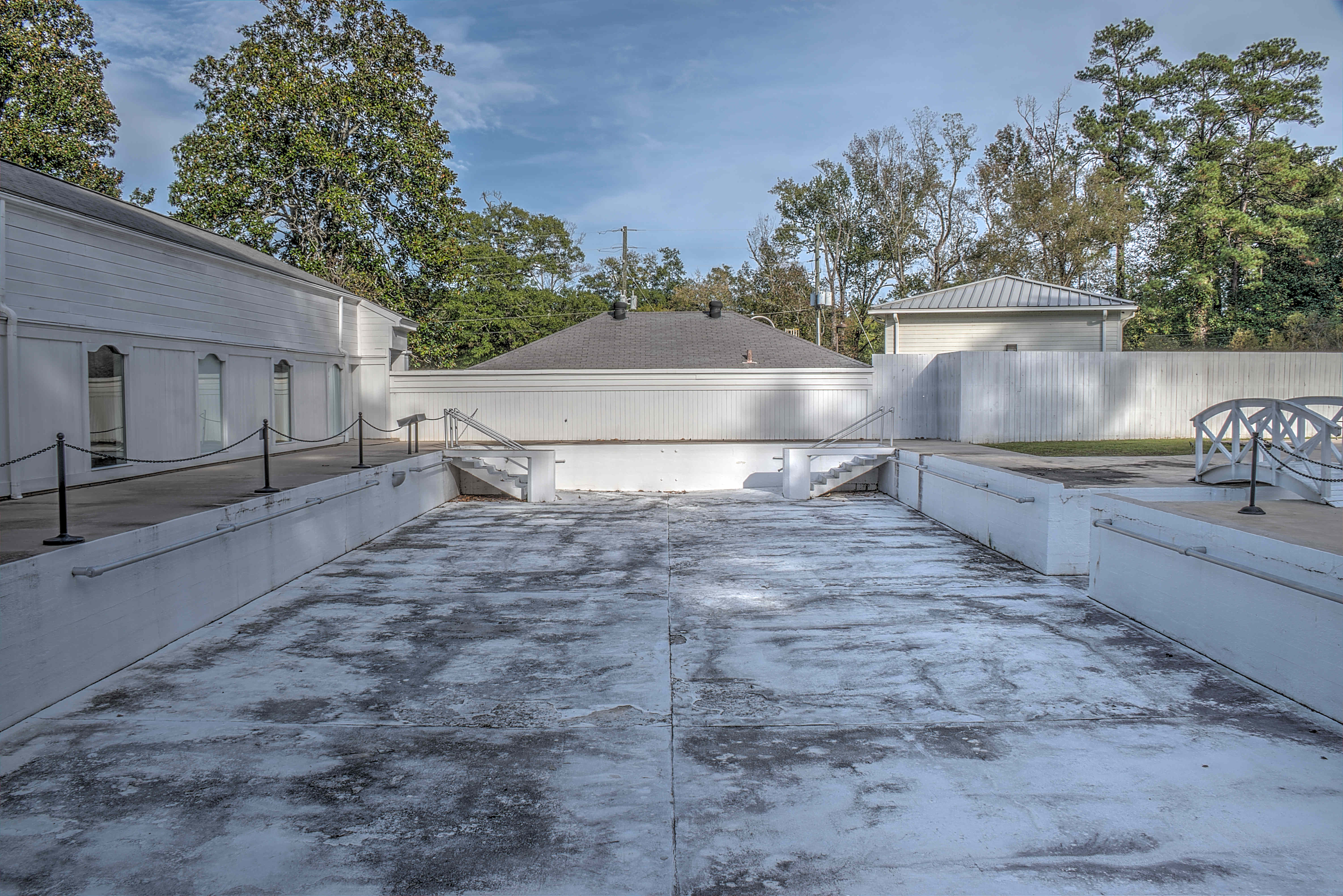
Warm Springs Pool

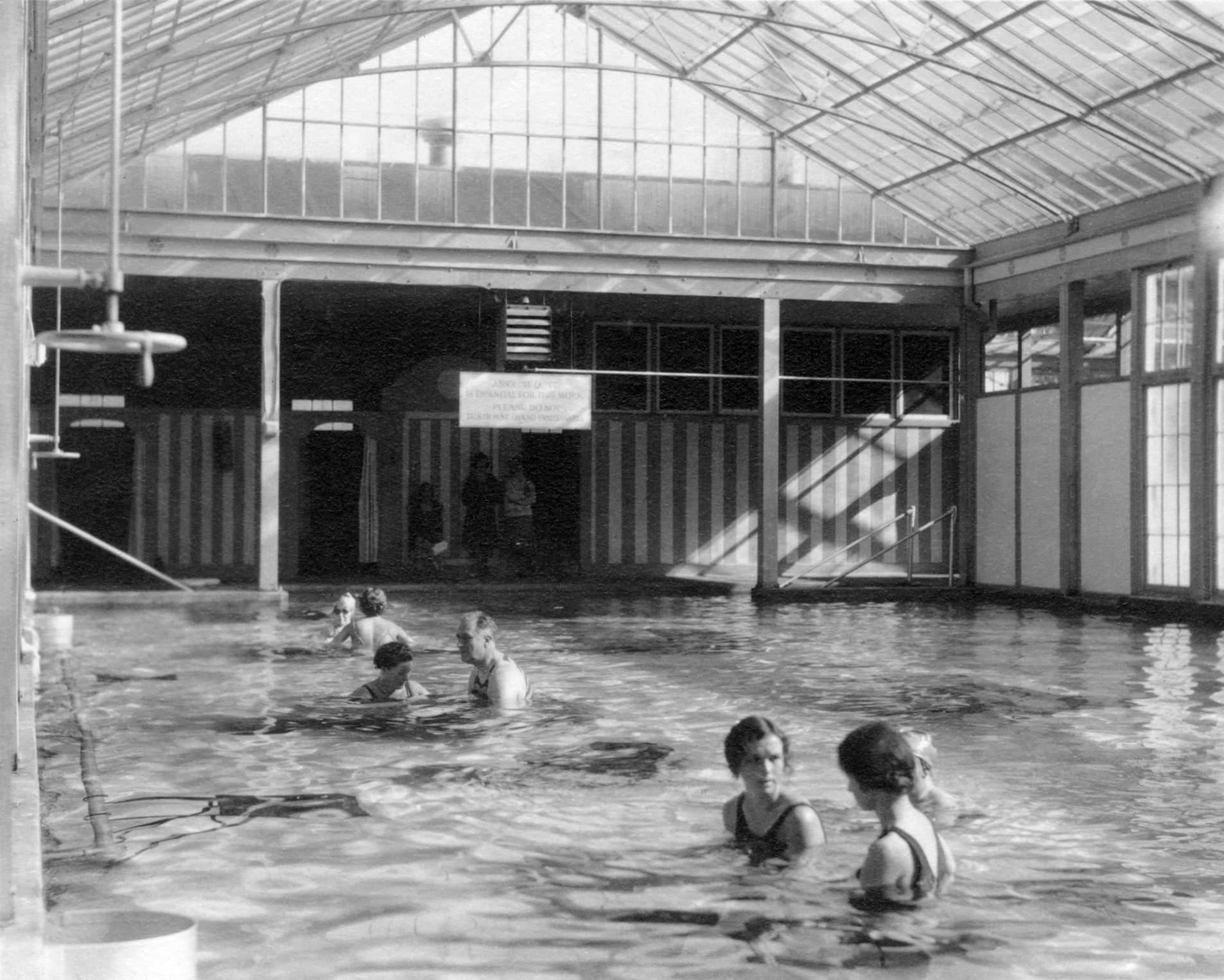
FDR at Warm Springs (1928)

== See also ==
- List of residences of presidents of the United States
