= Unfinished portrait of Franklin D. Roosevelt =

1945 painting by Elizabeth Shoumatoff

- Detail of the unfinished portrait
- Artist: Elizabeth Shoumatoff
- Year: 1945; 81 years ago

The unfinished portrait of Franklin D. Roosevelt is a watercolor of Franklin Delano Roosevelt, President of the United States, by Elizabeth Shoumatoff. Shoumatoff was commissioned to paint a portrait of Roosevelt and started her work around noon on April 12, 1945. At lunch, while sitting for the portrait, Roosevelt complained of a headache and subsequently collapsed. The president, who had suffered a cerebral hemorrhage, died later that day. FDR had galloping hypertension for several years before. The FDR Library Virtual Tour notes that about 15 minutes after the cerebral hemorrhage, arterial tension was measured at well over 300 systolic, diastolic 190.

While Shoumatoff never finished the portrait, she later painted a new one from memory, which wound up being largely identical. The unfinished portrait hangs at the Little White House in Warm Springs, Georgia, Roosevelt's personal retreat, with the finished version beside it.

== History ==
In 1943, Shoumatoff was told by her friend and client Lucy Mercer Rutherfurd, who was also the President's mistress:

You should really paint the President. He has such a remarkable face. There is no painting of him that gives his true expression. I think you could do a wonderful portrait, and he would be such an interesting person to paint! Would you do a portrait of him if it was arranged?

Rutherfurd would go on to make the arrangements, with Shoumatoff agreeing to sit in for two days within two weeks' time. She said of the agreement: "I was trapped into something I had neither wished for nor planned." She went on to talk about not being able to turn down the honor of being selected for a presidential commission.

== Painting ==
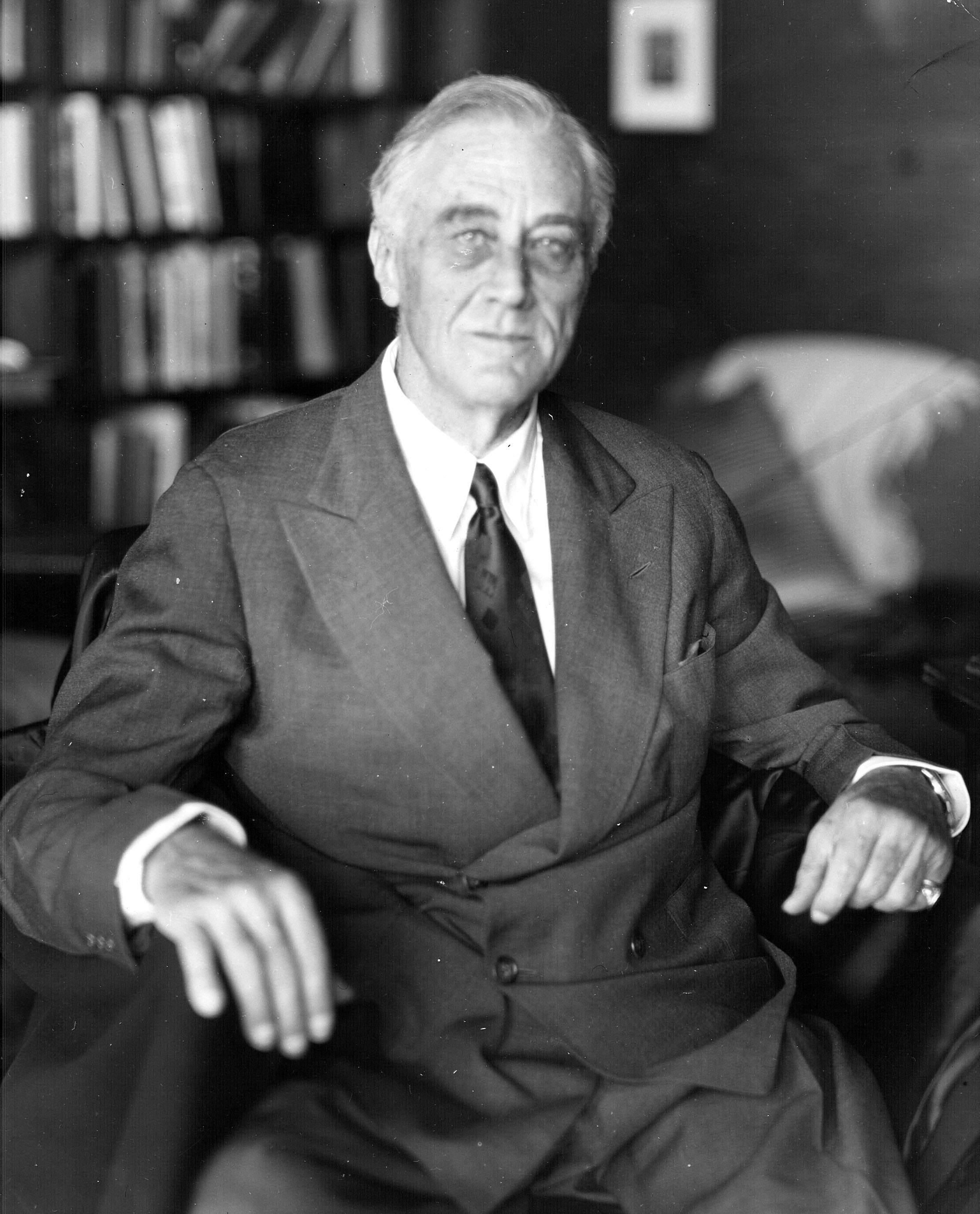
The last photograph of Franklin D. Roosevelt, taken by Nicholas Robbins at the Little White House in Warm Springs, April 11, 1945. Roosevelt died the following day.

Elizabeth Shoumatoff had begun working on the portrait of the president around noon on April 12, 1945. Roosevelt was being served lunch when he said "I have a terrific headache." He then slumped forward in his chair, unconscious, and was carried into his bedroom. Dr. Howard Bruenn, Roosevelt's attending cardiologist, determined that he had suffered a massive cerebral hemorrhage. Roosevelt never regained consciousness and died at 3:35 p.m. that day. Shoumatoff never finished the portrait.

Later, Shoumatoff decided to finish the portrait in Roosevelt's memory. She created a new painting based on memory. The only difference is that Roosevelt's red tie from the original is blue in the finished painting; all other aspects are completely identical. The finished portrait resides at the Little White House Historic Site, beside the original.
