= Kaazi =

Kaazi (Uganda)

Kaazi, Uganda is home to a training ground for The Uganda Scouts Association and is located south of Kampala and on the shores of Lake Victoria. It accommodated 3000 campers in the 2014 scout assembly training course.
