= The Uganda Scouts Association =

National Scouting organization of Uganda

- Headquarters: Kampala, Buganda Road
- Location: Currently Operating at Kaazi National Camping and Training Center
- Country: Uganda
- Founded: 1915
- Membership: 116,465
- Patron: Gen. Yoweri Kaguta Museveni
- Chief Scout: Prof. Dr. Owek. Salongo Hajji. Badru Kateregga
- Chairman National Scout Council: Odora Oryem
- National Executive Commissioner (NEC): Kizito Ashraf
- Chief Commissioner: Alice Nyiramahoro
- Affiliation: World Organization of the Scout Movement
- Website http://www.ugandascouts.org

The Uganda Scouts Association is the national Scouting organization of Uganda. The Association became a member of the World Organization of the Scout Movement in 1964. It serves 3 million Scout members (as of 2022).

== History ==
Scouting was founded in British protectorate of Uganda in 1915. Church missionary Rev. Canon H.M. Grace was sent to Ankole in western Uganda to start Mbarara High School. He also started the first troop in Uganda. The movement took time to spread over the country during World War I, as the public thought Scouting was too military. In 1918, the Rev. Grace was transferred to Namirembe, where he started a second troop of Scouts.

During World War II, Scouts served their community by working in post offices sorting mail, directing traffic and other meaningful duties.

Until 1971, Scouting grew very popular in Uganda and membership was spread all over the country. This all came to a halt between 1971 and 1981, due to the political situation in Uganda. Scouting suffered again in 1985 due to the wars and instability in the country.

In 1986, Scouting resurfaced, and the Ministry of Education formally became the overseer of the Uganda Scouts Association. Although Scouting is a non-governmental organization, the Ugandan government has taken a keen interest in the movement. Unlike other countries, the Ugandan government has appointed a full-time worker in every district, called district executive commissioners, to co-ordinate activities of the Scouts, in recognition of the immense contribution the movement makes and can make towards the education of the youth education outside the classroom.

A few years later, probably due to economic pressures the Government withdrew its funding for the paid District Executive Commissioners and they became volunteer posts.

Formed in 1994 the UK Uganda Network originally called the UNITE Network produced close relationships between Scouts in the UK and those in Uganda. This resulted in many joint projects and visits.

== Mottos ==
The Cub Scout motto is "do your best". The Junior Scout Motto is "Be Prepared"; the Venture Scout Motto is "Look wide"; and the Rover Scout Motto is "Service". The Scout Motto is Uwe Tayari, Be Prepared in Swahili.

== Emblem ==
The Scout emblem of the Uganda Scouts Association features a grey crowned crane, a symbol in use since Uganda was a colonial branch of British Scouting.

== UK Uganda Scout Network ==
The UK Uganda Scout Network is a forum where members of The Scout Association who are interested in promoting International Scouting and in particular with a specific interest in building friendships with the people of Uganda. Its aim is to bring together like-minded members of the Scout Association who have an interest in Africa, particularly Uganda, who wish to gain knowledge, exchange ideas and share experiences with each other.

The UK Uganda Scout Network provides an opportunity to expand International Scouting by raising awareness and promoting activities to support ideas and projects in the UK for members of the Uganda Scout Association and their communities.

So far, Scouts have built a new training centre at the National Campsite, Kaazi. Venture Scouts have undertaken a ten-year project to develop a plot of land at Buwenda, with the building of a training centre and camp site, known as the Baden-Powell Training Centre and Campsite, Buwenda, near Jinja. British Scouts have adopted a school in the slum area of Kampala, Bwaise, providing permanent classrooms and funding for child education. Scouts collected and transported a container full of educational resources enabling a library to be set up in a school in Iganga. A group of Explorer Scouts from Leicestershire built, in collaboration with local Scouts, two protected springs in the Busia district, repeat visits of this sort are planned.

== See also ==
- The Uganda Girl Guides Association
