= Unpaved road =

Type of road

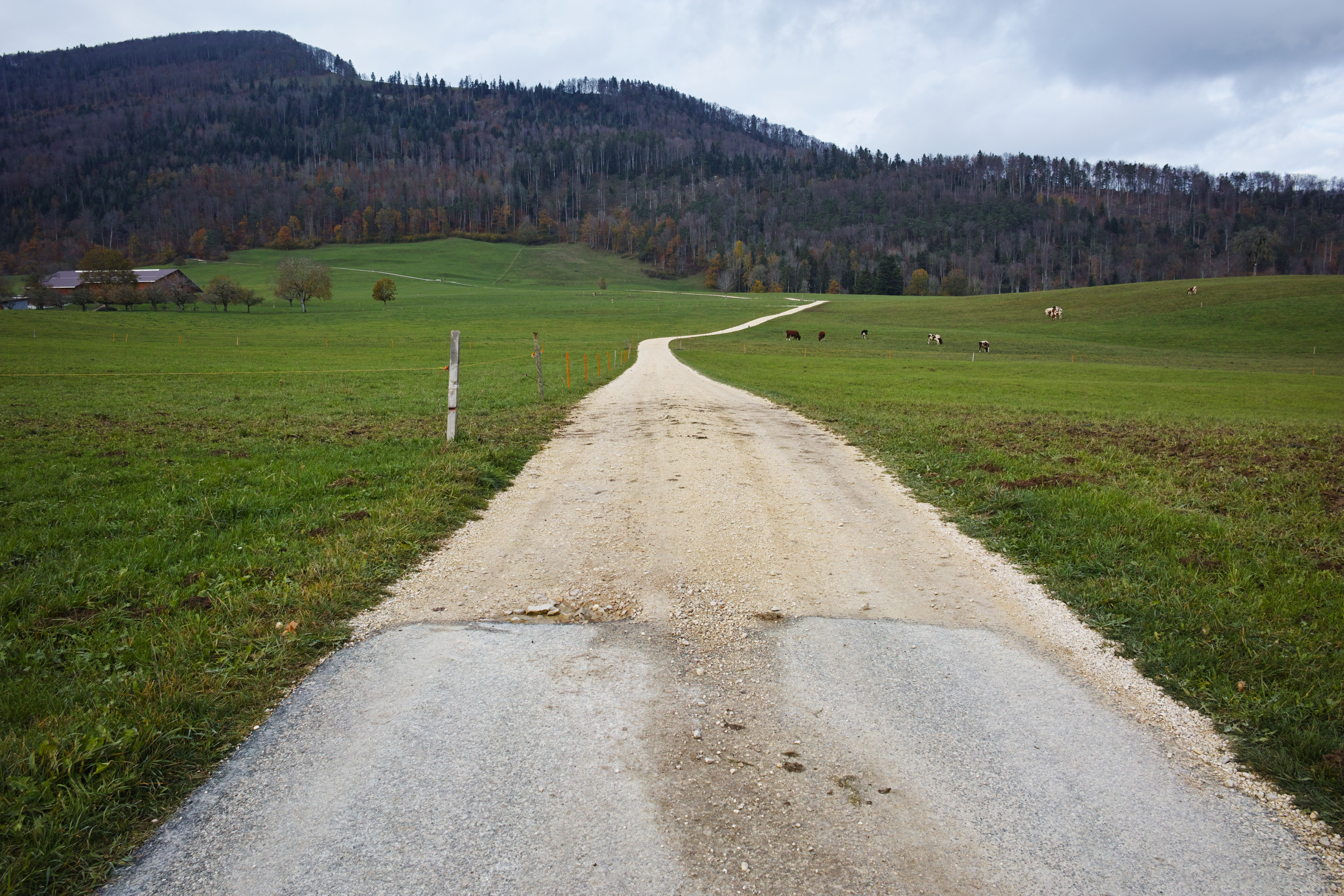
A paved road in Switzerland transitioning to a gravel track

An unpaved road is a type of road whose surface has not been sealed with a pavement treatment, such as concrete or bitumen. An unpaved road can be a dirt road, whose surface is the native material of the land surface (known as subgrade material), or it could be a gravel road, where the subgrade material has been covered by gravel but not sealed. There are approximately 13 million km (8.1 million mi) of unpaved road in the world, making up 57% of the total road length.

== Types ==
=== Forest or logging road ===
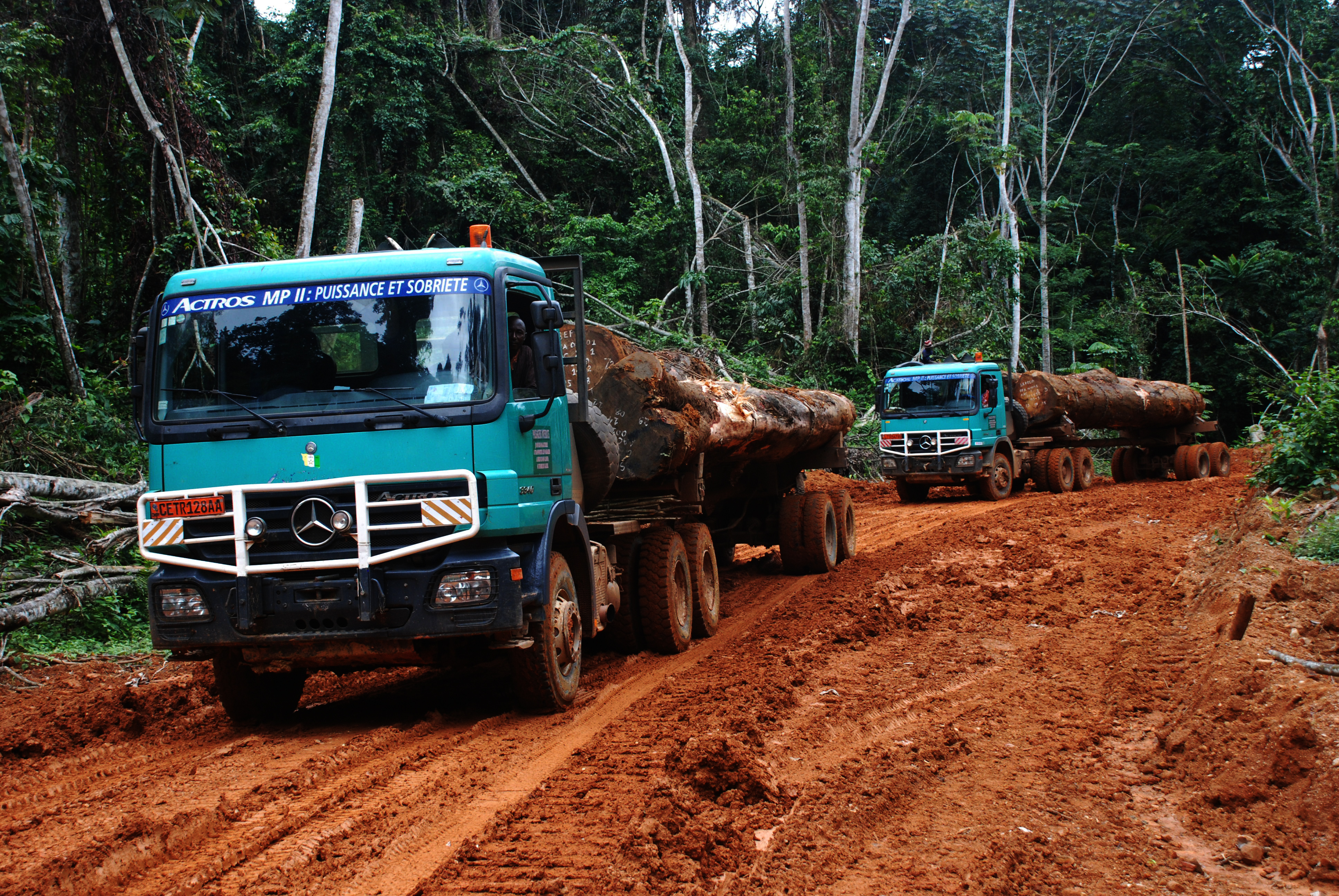
Logging road near Eséka in Cameroon

A forest road is a type of rudimentary access road, built by private companies, or government entities such as the United States Forest Service to access remote undeveloped areas. These roads are built mainly for the purposes of forest management, timber harvest, and livestock grazing, although in some cases they are also used for backcountry recreation access.

Typically, a high-clearance four-wheel drive vehicle is required to travel effectively on a forest road, especially where large potholes and/or waterbars are present. Switchbacks are employed to make the road passable through steep terrain.

These roads rapidly fall into disrepair and quickly become impassable. Remnants of old roads can exist for decades. They are eventually erased by washout, erosion, and ecological succession.

Logging trucks are generally given right of way. In areas that the practice is regulated, on non-highway roads with heavy logging traffic may be "radio-controlled", meaning that a CB radio on board any vehicle on the road is advised for safety reasons.

=== Resource road ===
According to the British Columbia Ministry of Forests, resource roads are typically "one- or two-lane gravel roads built for industrial purposes to access natural resources in remote areas". They may be used by industrial vehicles or the general public, and as a link to rural communities. Driving on resource roads can be hazardous for many reasons, including limited visibility, unusual road geometry, and the presence of wildlife. Disused resource roads can pose a danger to both drivers and passersby, due to the danger of landslides forming on unstable, poorly-drained ground.

=== Primitive road ===
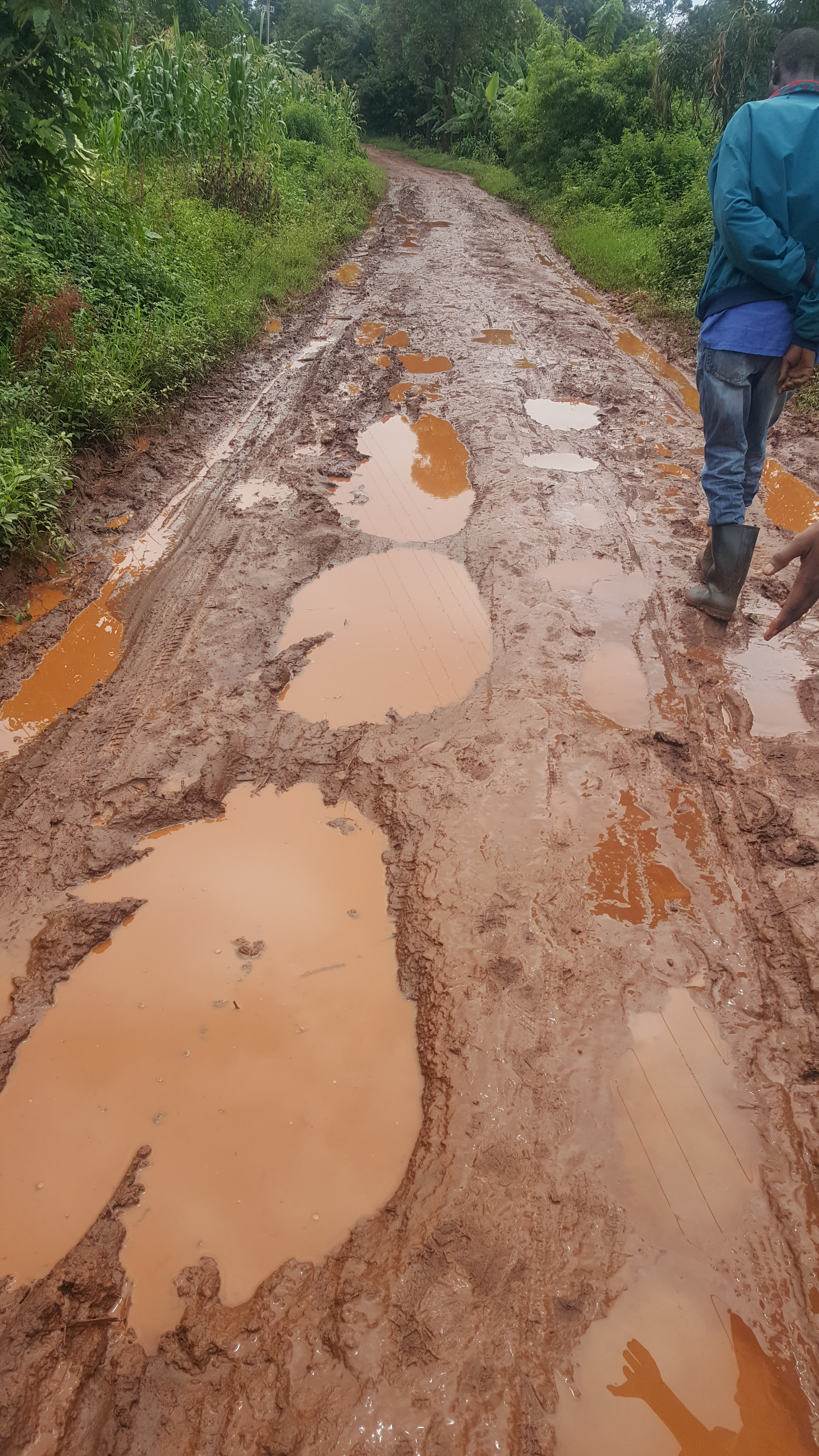
A primitive road near Buwenda, Uganda

A primitive road is a minor road system, used for travel or transportation that is generally not maintained or paved. Primitive roads primarily occur in rural farmlands, deserts, or forests rather than in developed areas.

There is no universal definition of primitive road. According to Washington (state) law, an unpaved road is a primitive road if:

1. It is not part of the county's primary road system
2. It has an average annual daily traffic of one hundred or fewer vehicles.

Road maintenance on primitive roads is optional for the county in Washington.

== Design and maintenance ==
The performance of unpaved roads is highly dependent on the properties of the underlying soil and the effectiveness of drainage systems. Proper design of unpaved roads includes consideration of material selection, compaction, and moisture control to ensure adequate bearing capacity and resistance to deformation. Unpaved roads are particularly sensitive to moisture variations and changes in groundwater conditions, which can significantly affect their bearing capacity and surface stability. Rising groundwater levels and prolonged wet conditions may lead to softening of the road structure, increased rutting, and reduced trafficability. Field studies have demonstrated that variations in groundwater table levels can directly influence the performance of gravel roads, highlighting the importance of drainage design and environmental considerations in maintaining long-term functionality.

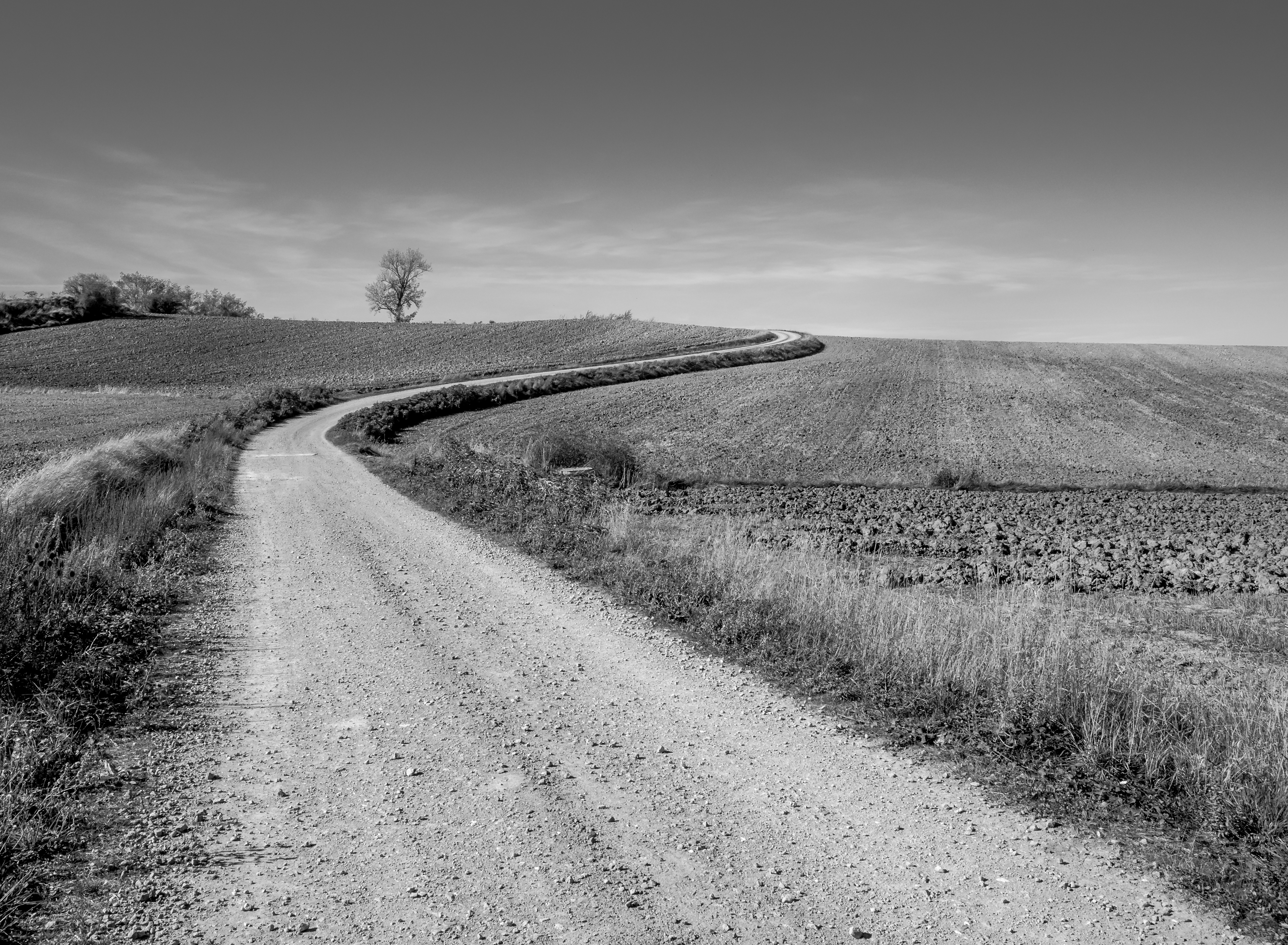
Gravel track in Spain

Research has shown that improved drainage solutions, such as the use of stone mattresses, can enhance the structural performance of unpaved and forest roads by facilitating water movement and reducing excess pore water pressure. This leads to improved load distribution and reduced deformation under traffic loading.

Recent advancements in unpaved roads monitoring include the use of unmanned aerial vehicles (UAVs) for surface condition assessment and profiling. Studies have shown that UAV-based techniques can provide accurate and efficient measurements of road surface characteristics, offering a promising alternative to traditional methods such as road surface testers and laser-based systems.

== Driving hazards ==
While most gravel roads are all-weather roads and can be used by ordinary cars, dirt roads may only be passable by trucks or four-wheel drive vehicles, especially in wet weather, or on rocky or very sandy sections. It is as easy to become bogged in sand as it is in mud; a high clearance under the vehicle may be required for rocky sections.

Driving on unpaved roads presents hazards often not present on paved or sealed roads:

- Dust can be thrown up from a passing vehicle reducing visibility.
- Washboard corrugations cause loss of control due to lack of tire contact. These are most often found near intersections as stopping or braking causes them to form.
- Skidding on mud after rain
- Vehicle fishtailing as a result of ruts in the surface. Often found on frequently traveled roads.
- In higher rainfall areas, the increased camber required to drain water, and open drainage ditches at the sides of the road, often cause vehicles with a high centre of gravity, such as trucks and off-road vehicles, to overturn if they do not keep close to the crown of the road.
- Many unpaved roads are only one lane wide or slightly larger, thus requiring special attention when driving at higher speeds.

== Length by country ==
The CIA Worldbook provides an estimate of the total length of unpaved roads per country for most, but not all countries in the world. The top 10 countries with the largest amount of roads is shown in the table, below:

Rank	Country	Length of unpaved roads (km)
1	United States	2,281,895
2	Brazil	1,754,000
3	Australia	727,645
4	Canada	626,700
5	China	622,000
6	Mexico	529,358
7	South Africa	591,876
8	Sweden	433,034
8	Russia	355,666
10	Finland	350,000

== See also ==
- Byway (road)
- Country lane
- Dirt road
- Forest Highway
- Forest railway
- Forest road
- Gravel road
- Logging
- Roads
- Road surface
- Track bed
- Trail
