= The Uganda Girl Guides Association =

National Guiding organization of Uganda

- Country: Uganda
- Founded: 1920
- Membership: 112,371
- Affiliation: World Association of Girl Guides and Girl Scouts

The Uganda Girl Guides Association is the national Guiding organization of Uganda. It serves 112,371 members (as of 2008). Founded in 1920, the girls-only organization became a full member of the World Association of Girl Guides and Girl Scouts in 1963.

Blandina Karungi was one of the first girls in Uganda to become a Girl Guide. She was both deaf and blind.

== See also ==
- The Uganda Scouts Association
