= Buwenda =

- Location in Uganda
- Coordinates: 00°28′00″N 33°11′00″E
- Country: Uganda
- Region: Eastern Region
- Sub-region: Busoga
- District: Bugiri
- Time zone: UTC+3 (EAT)

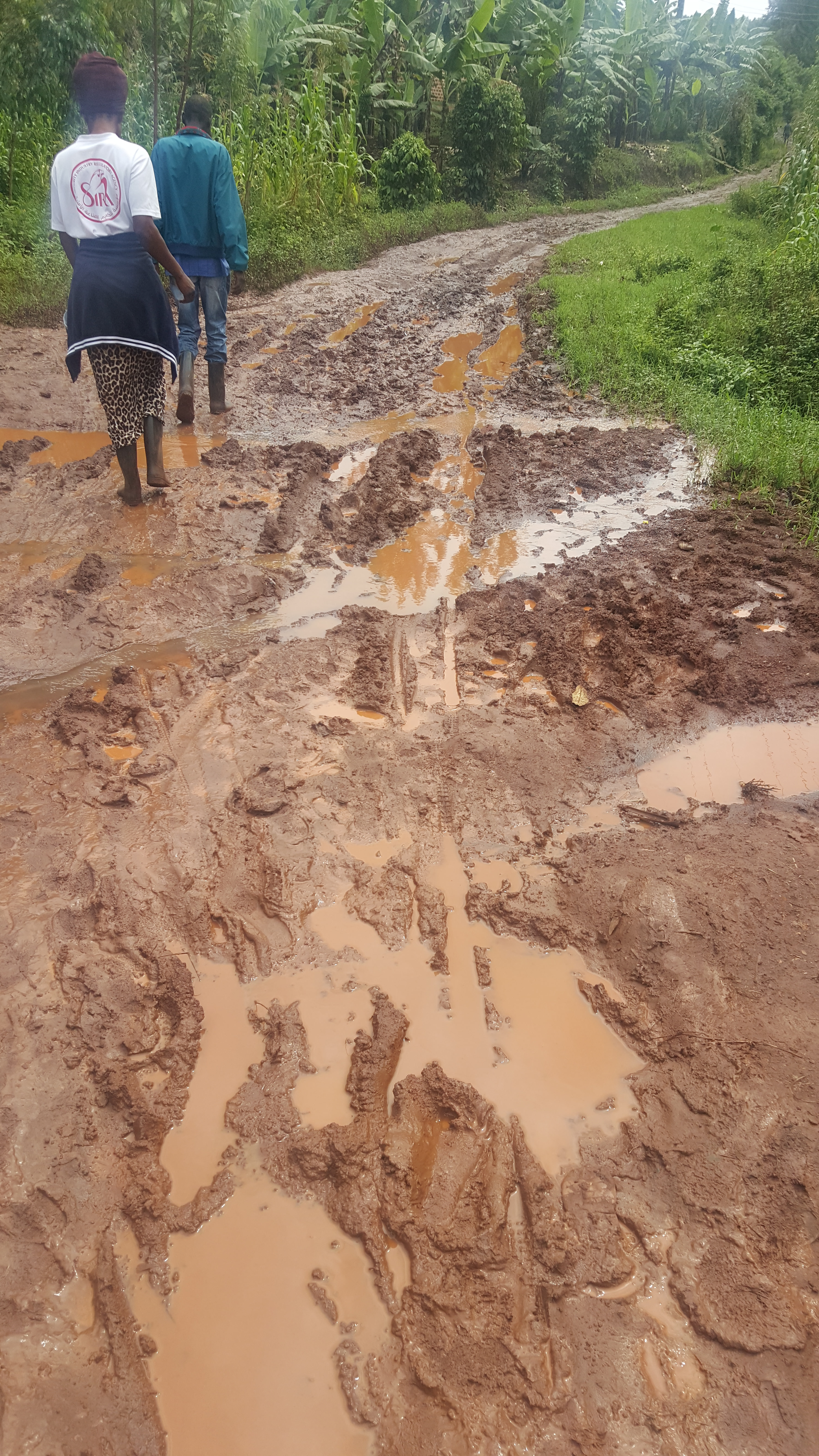
Muddy road near Nile River south of Buwenda

Buwenda is a small village in Uganda located in the Bugiri district, close to the town of Jinja.
