= National Register of Historic Places listings in Anne Arundel County, Maryland =

Location of Anne Arundel County in Maryland

Anne Arundel County, Maryland, United States, has 110 properties and districts listed on the National Register of Historic Places, including 12 National Historic Landmarks.

Latitude and longitude coordinates are provided for many National Register properties and districts; these locations may be seen together in a map.

Contents: Counties in Maryland
Allegany - Anne Arundel - Baltimore (city) - Baltimore County - Calvert - Caroline - Carroll - Cecil - Charles - Dorchester - Frederick - Garrett - Harford - Howard - Kent - Montgomery - Prince George's - Queen Anne's - Somerset - St. Mary's - Talbot - Washington - Wicomico - Worcester

This National Park Service list is complete through NPS recent listings posted August 21, 2026.

== Current listings ==
| | Name on the Register | Image | Date listed | Location | City or town | Description |
|---|---|---|---|---|---|---|
| 1 | Abington Farm | Abington Farm | September 13, 1984 (#84001328) | 1761 Severn Chapel Rd. 39°02′20″N 76°38′59″W | Millersville | Farmhouse dates to about 1840; on the property are several important outbuildings. |
| 2 | Aisquith Farm E Archeological Site | | November 8, 1991 (#91001601) | Address Restricted | Riva | Early and Middle Woodland periods base camp. |
| 3 | All Hallows' Church | All Hallows' Church | May 15, 1969 (#69000060) | Junction of Maryland Route 2, All Hallows' Church Rd., and South River Club Rd. 38°54′38″N 76°34′52″W | Davidsonville | Brick church with a hip roof constructed about 1710; Episcopal parish dates to 1682. |
| 4 | Annapolis National Cemetery | Annapolis National Cemetery | June 13, 1996 (#96000608) | 800 West St. 38°58′37″N 76°30′21″W | Annapolis | One of the 14 national cemeteries established by Abraham Lincoln in 1862; part of the Multiple Property Submission for Civil War Era National Cemeteries. |
| 5 | Anne Arundel County Free School | Anne Arundel County Free School | June 16, 1983 (#83002920) | 1298 Lavall Dr. 38°58′43″N 76°37′37″W | Gambrills | The only surviving schoolhouse erected in Maryland in response to the Maryland Free School Act of 1723; constructed between 1724 and 1746. |
| 6 | Artisan's House | Artisan's House | November 29, 1972 (#72000564) | 43 Pinckney St. 38°58′43″N 76°29′18″W | Annapolis | Frame dwelling from the 18th century; likely used as Revolutionary War barracks. |
| 7 | Arundel Cove Archaeological Site | | July 21, 1983 (#83002921) | Address Restricted | Glen Burnie | Remains of a prehistoric summer camp. |
| 8 | Captain Avery Museum | Captain Avery Museum | December 21, 2005 (#05001443) | 1418 East West Shady Side Rd. 38°51′07″N 76°30′43″W | Shady Side | Frame dwelling constructed about 1860; expanded as the National Masonic Fishing and Country Club. |
| 9 | Baltimore Light Station | Baltimore Light Station | December 2, 2002 (#02001417) | Gibson Island; 39°03′33″N 76°23′57″W | Gibson Island | Privately owned caisson lighthouse in the Chesapeake Bay; first lit in 1908. |
| 10 | Wiley H. Bates High School | Wiley H. Bates High School | July 26, 1994 (#92001267) | 1029 Smithville Street; 38°58′28″N 76°30′44″W | Annapolis | High school for African Americans opened in 1932. |
| 11 | Beck Northeast Site (18AN65) | | January 2, 1986 (#86000003) | Address Restricted | Davidsonville | Site with artifacts dating from the Late Archaic period through the Middle Woodland period. |
| 12 | Belvoir | Belvoir | November 19, 1971 (#71000366) | 0.5 miles (0.80 km) east of Crownsville on Maryland Route 178; 39°01′25″N 76°34′57″W | Crownsville | Brick, stone, and wood composite dwelling with sections possibly built as early as the 17th century. |
| 13 | Benson-Hammond House | Benson-Hammond House | April 5, 1990 (#90000595) | Poplar Ave. 39°11′23″N 76°39′17″W | Linthicum | Greek Revival style, 19th century brick dwelling. |
| 14 | Brice House | Brice House | April 15, 1970 (#70000259) | 42 East St. 38°58′45″N 76°29′16″W | Annapolis | Georgian style brick house dating to 1792; now offices. |
| 15 | Bunker Hill | Bunker Hill | October 11, 1984 (#84000034) | Maryland Route 178 and Millersville Rd. 39°03′24″N 76°37′42″W | Millersville | Large, eclectic, frame dwelling dating to 1820, with later 19th and 20th century additions. |
| 16 | Burle's Town Land | | January 21, 2011 (#10001147) | Address restricted | Annapolis | Providence, MD: Archeology of a Puritan-Quaker Settlement Near the Severn River MPS |
| 17 | Burrages End | Burrages End | April 11, 1973 (#73000897) | Nutwell Rd. off Maryland Route 2; 38°47′59″N 76°35′47″W | Lothian | Frame farmhouse dating to the 17th century. |
| 18 | John Callahan House | John Callahan House | October 2, 1973 (#73000888) | 164 Conduit St. 38°58′38″N 76°29′24″W | Annapolis | Brick dwelling with unusual gable-end principal façade; relocated twice. |
| 19 | Cedar Park | Cedar Park | May 15, 1969 (#69000061) | North of Galesville off Cumberstone Rd. 38°51′37″N 76°32′56″W | Galesville | Dwelling originally constructed in 1702, with later 18th and 19th century additions; operated for a time as a girl's academy. |
| 20 | Chance Boatyard | Chance Boatyard | April 14, 1999 (#99000421) | 222 Severn Ave. 38°58′22″N 76°28′54″W | Annapolis | Former boat-building and repair complex built between 1913 and 1942. |
| 21 | Chase-Lloyd House | Chase-Lloyd House | April 15, 1970 (#70000260) | 22 Maryland Ave. 38°58′52″N 76°29′21″W | Annapolis | Georgian brick mansion built 1769-1774 for Samuel Chase; now house museum. |
| 22 | Childs Residence | Childs Residence | March 6, 1986 (#86000416) | 1003 Cecil Ave. 39°03′23″N 76°38′56″W | Millersville | Former Post Office and community store built 1840-1852. |
| 23 | Christ Church | Christ Church | June 18, 1973 (#73000898) | Owensville Rd. (Maryland Route 255); 38°51′10″N 76°35′46″W | Owensville | Small, board-and-batten church dated to 1869, and reputed to be by the noted church architect, Richard Upjohn. |
| 24 | Citizens State Bank | Citizens State Bank | December 24, 2013 (#13000967) | 1402 Odenton Rd. 39°05′14″N 76°42′24″W | Odenton | |
| 25 | Colonial Annapolis Historic District | Colonial Annapolis Historic District | October 15, 1966 (#66000383) | District boundaries approximate city boundaries surveyed in 1695; 38°58′41″N 76°29′29″W | Annapolis | District encompassing the original town plan, surveyed in 1695, and about 120 18th century buildings. |
| 26 | Columbia Beach | | March 6, 2026 (#100012782) | Columbia Beach Road and streets to East, from Robinson Road to Calloway Drive; 38°49′15″N 76°30′01″W | Shady Side | |
| 27 | Corwell's Store, Corwell's Country Market, Johnson's Store | | August 26, 2026 (#100010488) | 166 Baltimore-Annapolis Boulevard; 39°06′09″N 76°33′05″W | Severna Park | |
| 28 | Patrick Creagh House | Patrick Creagh House | January 29, 1973 (#73000889) | 160 Prince George St. 38°58′41″N 76°29′10″W | Annapolis | A brick house with a steeply pitched gambrel roof originally built between 1735 and 1747. |
| 29 | Cross Roads Church | Cross Roads Church | February 10, 1983 (#83002922) | 911 Old General's Highway; 39°03′34″N 76°37′43″W | Millersville | Frame Italianate and Carpenter Gothic-style church built in 1861. |
| 30 | Davidsonville Historic District | Davidsonville Historic District | March 27, 1992 (#92000141) | Along Maryland Route 214 east to its junction with Davidsonville Rd. 38°55′19″N 76°37′51″W | Davidsonville | District reflecting the village's initial settlement in about 1835 through the early 20th century. |
| 31 | Douglass Summer House | Douglass Summer House | February 20, 1992 (#92000069) | 3200 Wayman Ave. 38°55′49″N 76°28′02″W | Highland Beach | Queen Anne style frame dwelling built in 1894-1895 by Major Charles Douglass, son of Frederick Douglass. |
| 32 | Elkridge Site | | May 22, 1978 (#78001441) | Address Restricted | Elkridge | Site abandoned as a permanent village in the early 16th century. |
| 33 | Epiphany Chapel and Church House | Epiphany Chapel and Church House | December 7, 2001 (#01001336) | 1419 Odenton Rd. 39°05′13″N 76°42′32″W | Odenton | Arts and Crafts style structure constructed in 1918 adjacent to Camp Meade (now Fort George G. Meade). |
| 34 | Etowah | | December 19, 2022 (#100008494) | 4056 Solomon's Island Rd. 38°53′00″N 76°36′18″W | Harwood vicinity | |
| 35 | Evergreen | Evergreen | May 15, 1969 (#69000066) | Sudley Rd., off Maryland Route 255; 38°50′27″N 76°35′21″W | Owensville | Federal style frame house dated to 1760. |
| 36 | First Avenue School | First Avenue School | December 26, 2007 (#07001309) | 13 SW 1st Ave. 39°09′54″N 76°37′39″W | Glen Burnie | Classical Revival structure built in 1899 and with an addition in 1917. |
| 37 | Fort Nonsense | Fort Nonsense | October 28, 1984 (#84000408) | Address Restricted | Annapolis | The last vestige of Annapolis Harbor fortifications dated to the early 19th century. |
| 38 | Freetown Rosenwald School | Freetown Rosenwald School | September 12, 2007 (#07000943) | 7825 Freetown Rd. 39°08′27″N 76°34′38″W | Glen Burnie | African American Rosenwald school building built in 1924-25. |
| 39 | Grassland | Grassland | September 13, 1984 (#84001331) | Maryland Route 32; 39°07′06″N 76°46′41″W | Annapolis Junction | Brick structure built in 1853 in a telescoping manner. |
| 40 | Gresham | Gresham | September 7, 1984 (#84001342) | 784 Mayo Rd. 38°54′36″N 76°31′44″W | Edgewater | Frame dwelling built in the early 19th century. |
| 41 | Hammond-Harwood House | Hammond-Harwood House | October 15, 1966 (#66000384) | Maryland Ave. and King George St. 38°58′51″N 76°29′19″W | Annapolis | House designed 1773-1774 and based on plate in Andrea Palladio's I Quattro Libri dell'Architettura, 1570; now house museum. |
| 42 | Hancock's Resolution | Hancock's Resolution | October 10, 1975 (#75000865) | East of Pasadena on Bayside Beach Rd. 39°08′06″N 76°26′49″W | Pasadena | Stone house constructed originally in 1785, with later additions; open as house museum. |
| 43 | Harundale Presbyterian Church | Harundale Presbyterian Church | July 12, 2024 (#100010493) | 1020 Eastway; 39°09′08″N 76°36′46″W | Glen Burnie | |
| 44 | HELIANTHUS III | | August 9, 1984 (#84001343) | Hilton Inn dock 38°58′31″N 76°29′49″W | Annapolis | Yacht built by Nathanael Greene Herreshoff (1848–1938) in 1924; lost at sea in the 1990s. |
| 45 | Holly Hill | Holly Hill | October 26, 1971 (#71000367) | Southeast of Friendship off Maryland Route 631; 38°43′30″N 76°33′59″W | Friendship | Original frame dwelling constructed in the fall or winter of 1698, later enclosed in brick with additions. |
| 46 | House by the "Town Gates" | House by the "Town Gates" | June 19, 1973 (#73000890) | 63 West St. 38°58′41″N 76°29′47″W | Annapolis | Brick structure constructed in the second quarter of the 19th century as a single-family dwelling; now commercial space. |
| 47 | Howard's Inheritance | Howard's Inheritance | July 23, 1998 (#98000887) | 721 Howard's Loop; 38°59′44″N 76°31′20″W | Annapolis | Brick house constructed as early as 1760. |
| 48 | Iglehart | Iglehart | March 7, 1973 (#73000896) | Maryland Route 178; 39°00′37″N 76°34′06″W | Iglehart | Greek Revival-style frame house built about 1830. |
| 49 | Indian Range | Indian Range | February 13, 1986 (#86000255) | 1012 Mt. Airy Rd. 38°55′46″N 76°38′55″W | Davidsonville | Gothic Revival country home built about 1852. |
| 50 | Katcef Archeological Site | | November 8, 1991 (#91001600) | Address Restricted | Crofton | Site from the Late Archaic period; part of Multiple Property Submission Prehistoric Human Adaptation to the Coastal Plain Environment of Anne Arundel County. |
| 51 | Larkin's Hill Farm | Larkin's Hill Farm | May 15, 1969 (#69000062) | Off Maryland Route 2 on Mill Swamp Rd. 38°53′09″N 76°35′47″W | Harwood | Brick house built about 1753; the estate served as a temporary capital of Maryland in 1683. |
| 52 | Larkin's Hundred | Larkin's Hundred | May 15, 1969 (#69000063) | Northeast of Harwood on Mill Swamp Rd. 38°53′19″N 76°34′57″W | Harwood | Brick house traditionally thought to have been built in 1704; likely constructed in the second quarter of the 18th century. |
| 53 | Linthicum Heights Historic District | Linthicum Heights Historic District | May 31, 2006 (#06000451) | Roughly bounded by Camp Meade Rd., Homewood Rd., Twin Oaks Rd., Locust Grove Rd., and Forest View Rd. 39°12′22″N 76°39′17″W | Linthicum | District encompassing a planned railroad suburb on the lines connecting Baltimore, Annapolis, and Washington, beginning in 1908. |
| 54 | Linthicum Walks | Linthicum Walks | August 9, 1984 (#84001344) | 2295 Davidsonville Rd. 38°59′56″N 76°40′15″W | Crofton | Farm complex including 19th century frame dwelling and tobacco barn. |
| 55 | London Town Publik House | London Town Publik House | April 15, 1970 (#70000262) | Northeast of Woodland Beach at the end of Londontown Rd. 38°56′30″N 76°32′25″W | Woodland Beach | Former Colonial era tavern built between 1758 and 1764; now part of Historic London Town and Gardens. |
| 56 | Magothy Quartzite Quarry Archeological Site | | November 8, 1991 (#91001599) | Address Restricted | Pasadena | Site includes several large outcroppings of quartzite and sandstone; part of Multiple Property Submission Prehistoric Human Adaptation to the Coastal Plain Environment of Anne Arundel County. |
| 57 | Marley Neck Rosenwald School | Marley Neck Rosenwald School | June 24, 2005 (#05000630) | 7780 Solley Rd. 39°09′45″N 76°33′53″W | Glen Burnie | |
| 58 | Martins Pond Site | Martins Pond Site | June 5, 1975 (#75000862) | Address Restricted | Annapolis | Middle-Late Woodland period site. |
| 59 | Mary's Mount | Mary's Mount | May 15, 1969 (#69000064) | Northeast of Harwood off Mill Swamp Rd. 38°52′27″N 76°35′08″W | Harwood | Earliest portion built in 1771. |
| 60 | Maryland Statehouse | Maryland Statehouse | October 15, 1966 (#66000385) | State Circle; 38°58′43″N 76°29′28″W | Annapolis | Oldest state capitol in continuous legislative use, dating to 1772. |
| 61 | MD 214 over Patuxent River Bridge | MD 214 over Patuxent River Bridge | September 23, 2025 (#100012266) | MD 214 over Patuxent River; 38°54′27″N 76°40′22″W | Davidsonville | Historic Highway Bridges of Maryland, 1694-1965 MPS. Crosses into Prince George's County |
| 62 | Mount Airy | Mount Airy | April 13, 1973 (#73000894) | Mount Airy Rd. off Maryland Route 424; 38°55′42″N 76°38′11″W | Davidsonville | Brick Georgian-Federal style dwelling built about 1857. |
| 63 | Mt. Moriah African Methodist Episcopal Church | Mt. Moriah African Methodist Episcopal Church | January 25, 1973 (#73000891) | 84 Franklin St. 38°58′39″N 76°29′38″W | Annapolis | African American church structure; now houses Banneker-Douglass Museum. |
| 64 | Mt. Tabor Good Samaritan Lodge No. 59 | Mt. Tabor Good Samaritan Lodge No. 59 | July 20, 2001 (#01000724) | 1407 St. Stephen's Church Rd. 39°00′34″N 76°37′49″W | Crownsville | African American benevolent society lodge constructed in 1899. |
| 65 | Mt. Tabor Methodist Episcopal Church | Mt. Tabor Methodist Episcopal Church | April 12, 2001 (#01000373) | 1421 St. Stephens Church Rd. 39°00′25″N 76°37′50″W | Crownsville | African American church structure constructed in 1893. |
| 66 | CHESAPEAKE BAY BROGAN MUSTANG | CHESAPEAKE BAY BROGAN MUSTANG | April 2, 1980 (#80001778) | Dock St. 38°58′36″N 76°29′11″W | Annapolis | Chesapeake Bay brogan built in 1907. After sinking three times, it was reportedly moved to a museum in St. Michael's, MD, where it was reportedly destroyed in a storm. |
| 67 | Norman's Retreat | Norman's Retreat | September 7, 1984 (#84001345) | 5325 Muddy Creek Rd. 38°49′00″N 76°33′20″W | Galesville | Farm complex featuring early-19th century dwelling, and related outbuildings. |
| 68 | Oakwood | Oakwood | August 2, 2001 (#01000820) | 4566 Solomons Island Rd. 38°51′26″N 76°37′04″W | Harwood | Frame tobacco plantation dwelling built in the 1850s. |
| 69 | Obligation | Obligation | May 15, 1969 (#69000065) | 1.8 miles (2.9 km) north of Harwood off Maryland Route 2; 38°53′27″N 76°36′17″W | Harwood | Dwelling begun in 1743 and later enlarged in 1827. |
| 70 | Odenton Masonic Lodge No. 209 | | July 25, 2022 (#100007940) | 1367 Odenton Rd. 39°05′06″N 76°42′05″W | Odenton | |
| 71 | Old City Hall and Engine House | Old City Hall and Engine House | January 29, 1973 (#73000892) | 211-213 Main St. 38°58′39″N 76°29′32″W | Annapolis | Brick building built 1821-1822 by the City of Annapolis; now commercial space. |
| 72 | Old Colony Cove Site | | November 21, 1978 (#78001442) | Address Restricted | Rose Haven | Shell midden and is 2,000 feet (610 m) long by 300 feet (91 m) wide. |
| 73 | OLIVER'S GIFT (log canoe) | | September 18, 1985 (#85002247) | 3473 Ranger Rd. 38°57′58″N 76°36′22″W | Davidsonville | Chesapeake Bay log canoe built in 1947. |
| 74 | James Owens Farm | | September 21, 1987 (#87001566) | 5682 Greenock Rd. 38°48′07″N 76°39′52″W | Bristol | Large mid-19th century brick late Greek Revival/Italianate dwelling and related outbuildings. |
| 75 | Owensville Historic District | Owensville Historic District | November 8, 2003 (#03001117) | Owensville Rd. and Owensville-Sudley Rd. 38°51′00″N 76°35′37″W | Owensville | District consisting of 27 buildings constructed between 1825 and 1875. |
| 76 | Paca House and Garden | Paca House and Garden | November 11, 1971 (#71000364) | 186 Prince George St. 38°58′47″N 76°29′18″W | Annapolis | Large Georgian style home built between 1763 and 1765; now house museum. |
| 77 | Parkhurst | Parkhurst | April 13, 2001 (#01000372) | 1059 Cumberstone Rd. 38°51′23″N 76°32′29″W | Harwood | Gothic Revival dwelling constructed about 1848-1850, with later alterations. |
| 78 | Pinkney-Callahan House | Pinkney-Callahan House | November 12, 1971 (#71000365) | 5 St. John's St. 38°58′49″N 76°29′32″W | Annapolis | Name of brick dwelling prior to move in 1972; now known as John Callahan House and located on Conduit Street. |
| 79 | Portland Manor | Portland Manor | April 18, 1996 (#96000434) | 5951 Little Rd. 38°47′22″N 76°38′22″W | Lothian | Frame dwelling constructed in 1725; enlarged about 1790 and about 1850. |
| 80 | Primrose Hill | Primrose Hill | September 14, 2000 (#00001034) | 3 Milkshake Ln. 38°57′37″N 76°30′11″W | Annapolis | Mid-18th century Georgian brick house; home of American portraitist, John Hesselius. |
| 81 | Quarter Place | Quarter Place | December 18, 2009 (#09001094) | 216 Marlboro Rd. 38°49′30″N 76°37′35″W | Lothian | |
| 82 | Queenstown Rosenwald School | Queenstown Rosenwald School | December 8, 2009 (#09001060) | 430 Queenstown Rd. 39°08′42″N 76°39′08″W | Severn | |
| 83 | Richland | Richland | December 26, 2007 (#07001310) | 195 Harwood Rd. 38°52′16″N 76°37′34″W | Harwood | Frame, hipped roof dwelling built about 1893. |
| 84 | Rising Sun Inn | Rising Sun Inn | September 12, 1985 (#85002199) | 1090 Generals' Highway; 39°02′54″N 76°36′53″W | Millersville | Frame dwelling dating to about 1753. |
| 85 | Robinson House | Robinson House | September 30, 2009 (#09000782) | 102 Evon Ct. 39°05′23″N 76°32′56″W | Severna Park | |
| 86 | Rosehill | Rosehill | May 29, 1987 (#87000852) | 2403 Bell Branch Rd. 38°59′00″N 76°39′30″W | Gambrills | Property of 17 acres (69,000 m^{2}) of partially wooded and cleared land on which are located a dwelling and six outbuildings. |
| 87 | St. James Church | St. James Church | May 7, 1972 (#72000565) | 4 miles (6.4 km) south of Lothian on Maryland Route 2; 38°47′23″N 76°35′55″W | Tracys Landing | Episcopal parish established in 1692; present church completed in 1765. |
| 88 | St. Paul's Chapel | St. Paul's Chapel | March 20, 1973 (#73000893) | Maryland Route 178; 39°01′32″N 76°36′01″W | Crownsville | Frame Episcopal church dating to about 1865. |
| 89 | John Sands House | | December 22, 2021 (#100007260) | 130 Prince George St. 38°58′42″N 76°29′10″W | Annapolis | |
| 90 | Sandy Point Farmhouse | Sandy Point Farmhouse | February 11, 1972 (#72000566) | Sandy Point State Park; 39°00′52″N 76°23′58″W | Sandy Point | Five part brick house constructed about 1815. |
| 91 | Sandy Point Shoal Light Station | Sandy Point Shoal Light Station | December 2, 2002 (#02001424) | Approximately 0.5 miles (0.80 km) off of Sandy Point; 39°00′57″N 76°23′06″W | Skidmore | Lighthouse on a caisson foundation erected in 1883; in 2006 it was sold at auction. |
| 92 | Lula G. Scott Community Center | Lula G. Scott Community Center | December 18, 2009 (#09001093) | 6243 Shady Side Rd. 38°50′08″N 76°30′49″W | Shady Side | |
| 93 | Upton Scott House | Upton Scott House | June 5, 1975 (#75000863) | 4 Shipwright St. 38°58′30″N 76°29′26″W | Annapolis | Georgian style brick dwelling built about 1762. |
| 94 | Skipworth's Addition | | December 22, 2008 (#08001216) | Address Restricted | Harwood | Site of the 1664 patent "The Addition," which was issued in December 1662 to George Skipworth; part of the Multiple Property Submission for Quaker Sites in the West River Meeting, Anne Arundel County, Maryland c. 1650-1785. |
| 95 | South River Club | South River Club | May 15, 1969 (#69000067) | West of South River on South River Club Rd. 38°54′21″N 76°33′51″W | South River | Structure built in 1742; home to the oldest continuously operating social club in America. |
| 96 | Stanton Center | Stanton Center | December 1, 1983 (#83003627) | 92 W. Washington St. 38°58′48″N 76°29′47″W | Annapolis | Former school for African Americans built in 1893; now community center. |
| 97 | Peggy Stewart House | Peggy Stewart House | November 7, 1973 (#73000887) | 207 Hanover St. 38°58′52″N 76°29′14″W | Annapolis | Georgian style house built between 1761 and 1764. |
| 98 | Sudley | Sudley | June 18, 1973 (#73000895) | North of Deale off Maryland Route 468 on Old Sudley Rd. 38°49′15″N 76°34′18″W | Deale | Frame dwelling originally built as grand hall-chamber style of the 1720-1730 period. |
| 99 | Summer Hill | Summer Hill | July 25, 1974 (#74000940) | East of Davidsonville off Maryland Route 214; 38°55′15″N 76°36′25″W | Davidsonville | Frame farmhouse of the mid 19th century. |
| 100 | Sunnyfields | Sunnyfields | August 11, 1983 (#83002923) | 825 Hammonds Lane; 39°12′32″N 76°38′00″W | Linthicum | Brick and frame house with sections built as early as 1785. |
| 101 | Thomas Point Shoals Light Station | Thomas Point Shoals Light Station | February 20, 1975 (#75000864) | Kent Island in Chesapeake Bay; 38°53′55″N 76°26′10″W | Annapolis | Lighthouse built in 1873; not automated until 1986. |
| 102 | Tracy's Landing Tobacco House No. 2 | Tracy's Landing Tobacco House No. 2 | November 30, 1982 (#82001580) | Off Maryland Route 2; 38°46′55″N 76°35′29″W | Tracy's Landing | Tobacco barn built in 1805. |
| 103 | Tulip Hill | Tulip Hill | April 15, 1970 (#70000261) | 4621 Muddy Creek Rd. 38°51′03″N 76°33′02″W | Galesville | Plantation house built between 1755 and 1756 |
| 104 | Turkey Hill | Turkey Hill | July 24, 1979 (#79001109) | 106 W. Maple Rd. 39°12′21″N 76°39′17″W | Linthicum | Frame and field stone dwelling built about 1825. |
| 105 | Twin Oaks | Twin Oaks | March 21, 1986 (#86000670) | 5910 Oak Twin Ct. 39°12′36″N 76°39′10″W | Linthicum | Brick Greek Revival influenced dwelling constructed in 1857. |
| 106 | Universal Lodge No. 14 | Universal Lodge No. 14 | November 26, 2008 (#08001101) | 64 Clay St. 38°58′47″N 76°29′49″W | Annapolis | Built c. 1880, purchased in the 1940s by an African American Masonic lodge (which was founded in 1865 by a group of African American civilian employees of the U.S. Naval Academy), and renovated for use as a lodge meeting hall. |
| 107 | U.S. Coast Guard Yard Curtis Bay | U.S. Coast Guard Yard Curtis Bay | August 5, 1983 (#83002924) | Off Maryland Route 173; 39°11′59″N 76°34′02″W | Glen Burnie | Shipyard located on Curtis Bay; it is the Coast Guard's sole shipbuilding and major repair facility. |
| 108 | U.S. Naval Academy | U.S. Naval Academy | October 15, 1966 (#66000386) | Maryland Ave. and Hanover St. 38°59′02″N 76°29′14″W | Annapolis | Founded as the Naval School in 1845 by Secretary of the Navy George Bancroft; located at the former U.S. Army post Fort Severn. |
| 109 | Whitehall | Whitehall | October 15, 1966 (#66000387) | Off St. Margaret's Rd. 39°00′15″N 76°25′37″W | Annapolis | Brick plantation house built about 1760. |
| 110 | Woodwardville Historic District | Woodwardville Historic District | November 8, 2003 (#03001115) | 937 to 987 Patuxent Rd. and 2811 to 2825 5th Ave. 39°03′07″N 76°44′08″W | Woodwardville | District consisting of 16 historic structures, most of which are located adjacent to Patuxent Road. |

== Former listing ==
| | Name on the Register | Image | Date listed | Date removed | Location | City or town | Description |
|---|---|---|---|---|---|---|---|
| 1 | Hammond Manor House | Hammond Manor House | October 16, 1974 (#74002341) | October 23, 1978 | U.S. Naval Academy dairy off MD 175 | Gambrills | Destroyed by fire on October 15, 1978. |

== See also ==
- List of National Historic Landmarks in Maryland
- National Register of Historic Places listings in Maryland
