= Oakwood (Harwood, Maryland) =

- Oakwood Manor
- U.S. National Register of Historic Places
- Maryland Historical Trust
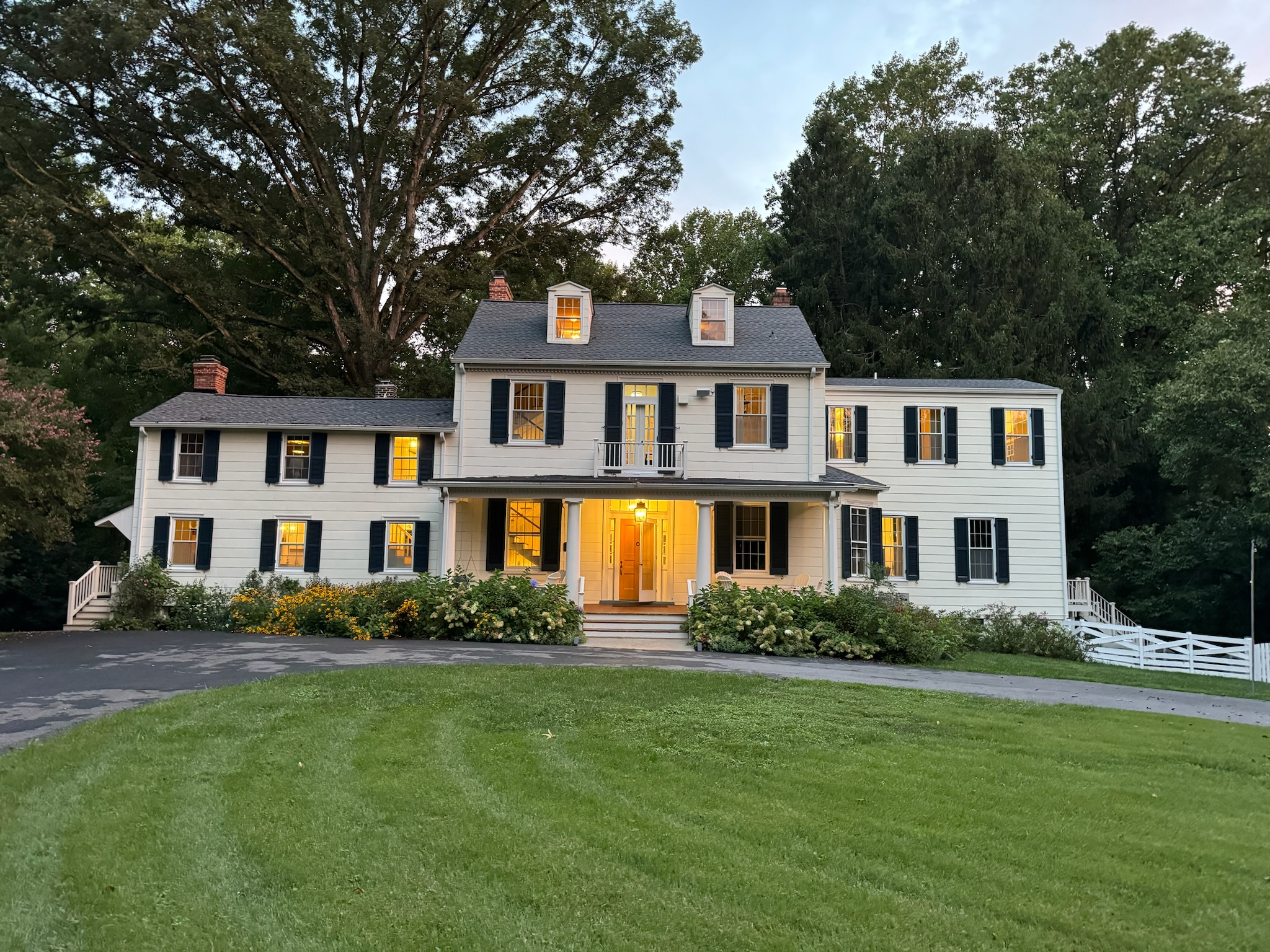
- Oakwood Manor, Harwood, Maryland
- Location: Harwood, Anne Arundel County, Maryland
- Coordinates: 38°51′25.87″N 76°37′4.11″W
- Built: c. 1850–1860
- Architectural style: Greek Revival, vernacular farmhouse
- NRHP reference No.: 01000820
- MHT No.: AA-741

Significant dates
- Added to NRHP: August 2, 2001
- Designated MHT: 2001

Oakwood (formally Oakwood Manor) is a historic antebellum farmhouse in Harwood, Anne Arundel County, Maryland. Raised between approximately 1850 and 1860 by Sprigg Harwood (1808–1894), it endures as one of the most intact mid-nineteenth-century tobacco plantation dwellings surviving in the county. The property itself is a portion of the historic Cherry Hill tobacco plantation, previously owned by Osborne Harwood (1760–1847), Sprigg's father.

The property commands historical distinction in the areas of agriculture, architecture, and politics and government. It was the seat of Sprigg Harwood, a prominent politician and the namesake of the Harwood community, who assumed a leading role in the ill-fated effort to deliver Maryland into the Confederate States of America at the outset of the American Civil War.

Oakwood was listed on the National Register of Historic Places on August 2, 2001 (NRHP Reference No. 01000820).

== Architecture ==
Oakwood is a 2½-story, double-pile plan, frame vernacular farmhouse graced with Greek Revival-influenced decorative detailing. The main block spans three bays in width and is notable in part because its double-pile floor plan — more commonly encountered in urban residential construction of the period — renders it a distinctive example of the form within a rural Maryland agricultural landscape.

The main house is crowned by a pitched gable roof. Two 6/6 dormer windows pierce the east and west slopes, and the boxed cornice presents a dentiled frieze and an elaborately molded crown. At each gable end, an internal brick corbeled fireplace chimney rises with quiet authority. The house contains five fireplaces in total; the living room features an Italian marble mantel from a Mediterranean island no longer legally mined for its marble, while the dining room mantel is Victorian. The kitchen fireplace retains its original cooking apparatus, including an oven later converted for other uses — and it was this coal-burning fixture, built in Baltimore, that was used in the documentation of Oakwood's age.

The east façade is fenestrated with four 8/8 sash windows; the rear opens through pairs of French doors surmounted by three-light transoms. The principal entrance — known as a coffin door for its width, sufficient to accommodate a casket — is framed by a six-light transom and flanking sidelights, while Greek Revival-style pilasters stand between the door and adjacent windows. The original transom glass around the front door is preserved, as is the original old glass in the library's bay window. Above the entrance, a second-floor doorway fitted with double French doors opens onto a small balustraded balcony.

The interior originally featured 14-foot ceilings in the living and dining rooms, later reduced by the installation of false ceilings. Interior walls are a combination of original plaster and later wallboard. The room above the kitchen wing served as slave and servant quarters, and the small side of the house — accessible from the main block through doors fitted with large deadbolt locks — was used by house slaves and servants. The powder room was originally the butler's pantry; the upstairs bathroom on the small side was the governess's room; and the master bathroom was originally a bedroom where children were born and slept when very young.

A classically composed front porch presides over the primary façade. The original porch was considerably smaller and featured stoops for mounting horses; physical evidence of this earlier configuration remains visible in the front of the house. A later porch, erected in the early twentieth century using columns salvaged from another historic home being demolished at the time, is the one that stands today. An original two-story frame kitchen wing projects from the south gable end, set flush with the main block's façade and sharing a continuous brick foundation. A c. 1894 bay window advances from the east face of the wing's first floor. Both sections are clad in asbestos shingles laid over the original horizontal Linden wood siding beneath.

The property is flanked on three sides by streams, the headwaters of two of which originate on the grounds. The land includes non-tidal wetlands and contains thousands of naturalized daffodils throughout the woods and gardens, along with irises, daylilies, and peonies.

== History ==
=== Origins: The Cherry Hill Plantation and the Harwood Family ===
Oakwood was built by Sprigg Harwood (1808–1894) on a portion of the Cherry Hill tobacco plantation, a tract that had previously been owned and operated by his father, Osborne Harwood (1760–1847). Osborne Harwood had served in the Maryland State House of Delegates, establishing the family as a fixture of the southern Anne Arundel County planter class. Sprigg Harwood was born into this world of rural gentry and tobacco agriculture; in raising Oakwood between approximately 1850 and 1860, he created what the Maryland Historical Trust would later describe as an "attractive, but not grand, plantation house" representing the architectural taste of a middling member of Maryland's rural gentry.

=== Tobacco and the Agricultural Landscape ===
When Sprigg Harwood raised Oakwood in the 1850s, tobacco was the uncontested foundation of southern Anne Arundel County's economy — as it had been for more than two centuries. Anne Arundel is among the five southern Maryland counties — together with Calvert, Charles, Prince George's, and St. Mary's — that collectively define one of the most distinctive tobacco-growing regions in the United States. The variety cultivated across these lowland soils, known as Orinoco (or Type 32 Southern Maryland tobacco), was prized throughout England and continental Europe for its slow, even burn; Maryland tobacco had been exported to European markets since the 1630s and remained a dominant commodity through the antebellum period.

At Oakwood specifically, the scale of tobacco production is documented with unusual precision. In 1850, the property produced 20,000 pounds of tobacco, grown through the labor of 20 working-age enslaved people. The U.S. Census recorded that same year that tobacco was grown in every county in Maryland, with a statewide yield exceeding 21 million pounds — and Oakwood's output was representative of the mid-sized plantation operations that formed the backbone of that system. The cultivation of tobacco had driven the forced importation of enslaved Africans into the Chesapeake from the seventeenth century onward, and by the mid-nineteenth century the crop's demands structured virtually every dimension of life on a southern Maryland plantation — the land it occupied, the labor it consumed, and the built environment it generated, including the locked internal doors separating enslaved quarters from the main house at Oakwood.

Oakwood's listing on the National Register of Historic Places in the area of agriculture recognizes precisely this weight of history. The Maryland Historical Trust's nomination states that the property reflects not only the slave-based economy of the antebellum period but also the county's difficult post-war transition to a free labor system — a transition made visible in the physical fabric of a plantation dwelling that survived largely intact through both eras. The National Trust for Historic Preservation identified Southern Maryland's tobacco heritage as among the nation's most endangered cultural resources as recently as 2004.

=== Sprigg Harwood and the Maryland Secession Crisis ===
In addition to managing Oakwood, Sprigg Harwood held a constellation of public offices over his lifetime. He served as Clerk-of-the-Court in Anne Arundel County for approximately 30 years, as State Treasurer from 1860 to 1864, and was elected to the Maryland Senate in 1865. He was among the most consequential political figures in antebellum southern Anne Arundel County.

At the outbreak of the American Civil War, Harwood became a central figure within Maryland's secessionist movement — one that played out against an extraordinarily fraught political backdrop. Maryland occupied a position of strategic consequence unlike any other state: its secession would have surrounded Washington, D.C., with hostile territory and effectively severed the federal government from the North. As the Maryland State Archives has documented, in early 1861 the state was "walking a tightrope between the Union and the Confederacy," its political sympathies divided between a Unionist majority in the western and northern counties and strong Confederate sentiment throughout the low-lying Chesapeake Bay region — precisely the landscape of tobacco plantations and enslaved labor that Oakwood embodied.

Harwood was a leader in the failed initiative to have Maryland leave the Union and align with the newly formed Confederate States of America. Working with former Governor Thomas George Pratt, he helped draw up a formal secession plan and moved within a circle of prominent landowners and politicians who applied sustained pressure on Governor Thomas Holliday Hicks to convene the General Assembly and bring the question of secession to a formal vote. Secessionist sentiment in southern Anne Arundel County ran high; the county fell within the plantation counties most closely tied, economically and culturally, to the Confederate cause.

The effort ultimately failed. Responding to secessionist pressure, Governor Hicks convened a special session of the General Assembly in Frederick, a strongly pro-Union town, on April 26, 1861. A secession resolution was introduced and defeated in the state Senate by a vote of 21-19. The legislature adjourned on August 7, 1861, intending to reconvene on September 17. On that day, federal troops and Baltimore police descended on Frederick and arrested the pro-Confederate members of the Assembly — more than a third of its membership — foreclosing any further opportunity for a secession vote.

Maryland's divided loyalties were reflected in the men who ultimately took up arms: roughly 60,000 Marylanders fought for the Union, while an estimated 20,000 to 25,000 crossed the Potomac to serve the Confederacy. The state's fractured Civil War identity left a legacy that historians have described as more contested in memory and public narrative than that of any comparable border state.

=== Post-War Ownership and the Transition to Free Labor ===
Following the Civil War and the abolition of slavery, Harwood sold Oakwood to Jacob Roger Woollen in 1866. The transition marked a decisive shift in the property's agricultural identity: under Woollen's ownership, Oakwood moved away from tobacco and concentrated on wheat and corn production, with tenant farmers replacing the enslaved labor force that had previously worked the land. The property remained in the Woollen family until 1937, when it was purchased by T. Standford and Bessie Sheppard. Their daughter, Elizabeth Collison, retained ownership of most of the surrounding farmland.

Oakwood and 6.97 acres were sold to the Dodderidge family in 1941, separating the house from the larger agricultural tract. The home subsequently passed to the Weems family and then to John and Amanda Falk. The French doors in the living and dining rooms were installed during the 1940s renovations; prior to that time, those openings had resembled windows in the manner of the Hammond-Harwood House in Annapolis.

In 1978, Oakwood was purchased by Dr. Joan Turek and her former husband. Dr. Turek dedicated considerable effort to preserving the home's historic fabric for future generations, commissioning a structural review — which found the building to be sound — and undertaking restoration of original plaster in the living and dining rooms using techniques consonant with the period of the house's construction.

The Oakwood estate is currently owned by the Bennetts.

== Significance ==
The Maryland Historical Trust's National Register nomination, prepared by Sherri M. Marsh in February 2001, recognizes Oakwood as historically significant across three areas of distinction:

Agriculture

As a highly intact mid-nineteenth-century tobacco plantation dwelling, Oakwood illuminates the patterns of agricultural life in Anne Arundel County, encompassing both the slave-based economy of the antebellum period — including the documented production of 20,000 pounds of tobacco by 20 enslaved workers in 1850 — and the post-war passage to a free labor system. Anne Arundel is part of the five-county Southern Maryland tobacco region recognized by the National Park Service as one of the most distinctive tobacco-growing landscapes in the United States.

Architecture

The house merits architectural recognition for its Greek Revival-influenced decorative detailing and its uncommon double-pile floor plan — a configuration more typically associated with urban residential construction of the period, lending Oakwood a singular character within its rural Maryland setting. The property's interior preserves notable original features including an Italian marble living room mantel from a Mediterranean island no longer legally mined for marble, original plaster in key rooms, antique glass in the front door surround and library bay window, and the original spatial arrangement reflecting the domestic hierarchies of the antebellum plantation household.

Politics and Government

The property is bound to the legacy of Sprigg Harwood, who both constructed Oakwood and held a succession of public offices including State Treasurer, State Senator, and Clerk-of-the-Court. In collaboration with former Governor Thomas George Pratt, he drew up a formal secession plan and stood at the center of the effort to align Maryland with the Confederacy at the opening of the Civil War.

== National Register of Historic Places ==
Oakwood was listed on the National Register of Historic Places on August 2, 2001 under reference number 01000820. It is carried in the Maryland Historical Trust's Inventory as AA-741. The nomination was prepared by Sherri M. Marsh of the Maryland Historical Trust in February 2001.

The property stands among only 108 properties and districts listed on the National Register in Anne Arundel County, Maryland.

== See also ==
- National Register of Historic Places listings in Anne Arundel County, Maryland
- Harwood, Maryland
- Mary's Mount — another NRHP-listed historic home in Harwood
- Richland (Harwood, Maryland) — nearby NRHP-listed property
- Maryland in the American Civil War
- Hammond-Harwood House — Annapolis landmark referenced in the architectural history of Oakwood
- Greek Revival architecture
- Plantations in the American South
- Tulip Hill
