= Colonial Annapolis Historic District =

Historic district in Maryland, United States

- U.S. National Register of Historic Places
- U.S. National Historic Landmark District
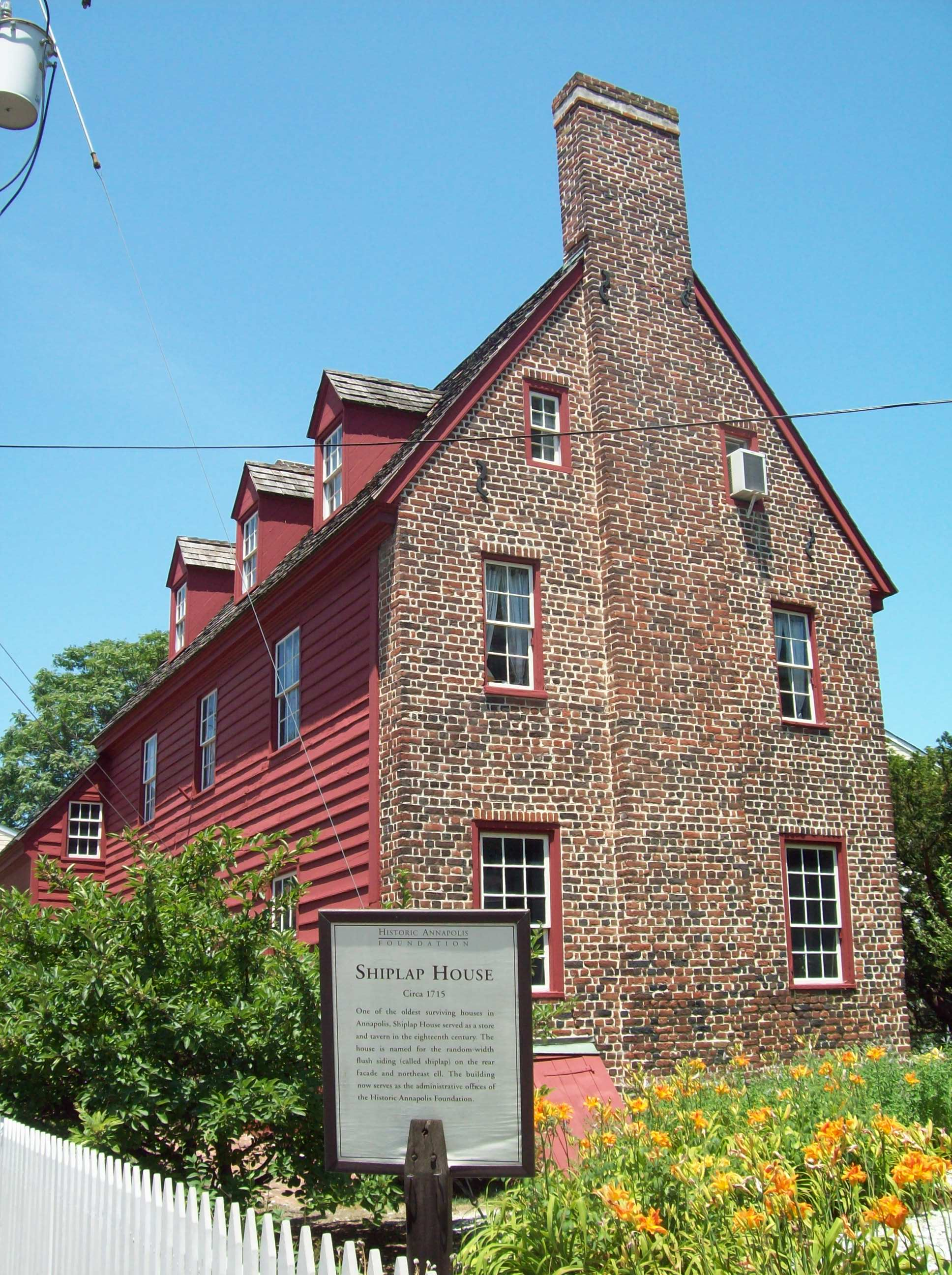
- Shiplap House, Colonial Annapolis Historic District, July 2009

- Location within Maryland Location within the United States
- Location: District boundaries approximate city boundaries surveyed in 1695, (original); Roughly bounded by Spa Creek, Southgate Ave., Hanover and West Sts.,(increase); Annapolis, Maryland
- Coordinates: 38°58′41″N 76°29′29″W
- Built: 1695
- Architect: Multiple
- Architectural style: Late Victorian, Colonial, Georgian (original); Early Republic, Late Victorian, Colonial (increase)
- NRHP reference No.: 66000383 (original); 84003875 (increase)

Significant dates
- Added to NRHP: October 15, 1966
- Boundary increase: September 29, 1984
- Designated NHLD: June 23, 1965

The Colonial Annapolis Historic District is a historic district in the City of Annapolis, the state capital of Maryland, that was designated a National Historic Landmark District in 1965 and was geographically further expanded in 1984.

== History and description ==
Annapolis has served as the capital of both the Colony/Province and the State, along with being the county seat of Maryland's third county, Anne Arundel County, and is one of the first planned cities in colonial America. Many elements of the original town plan, developed in 1695 by Francis Nicholson, and about 120 of the 18th century buildings still remain. Along with its neighboring capital city to the south of Williamsburg of the Province/Colony of Virginia and the first years of the independent Commonwealth of Virginia, both towns serve as a "living microcosm" of the 1700s and early 1800s in the United States.

In terms of individually listed National Historic Landmarks and other sites on the National Register of Historic Places, the original historic colonial-era area includes the Maryland State House on State Circle, St. Ann's Church (Anglican/Episcopal) on neighboring adjacent Church Circle, and the historic residences, townhouses and some larger mansions of the town's wealthiest and most influential citizens of the Hammond-Harwood House and the Paca House and Gardens, the increase also includes the Artisan's House, Brice House, John Callahan House, and the Chase-Lloyd House.

Most of the downtown and harbor waterfront areas were declared a National Historic Landmark in 1965.

National educational institutions in the district include St. John's College (founded as "King William's School" in 1696, elevated to collegiate status in 1784) and the United States Naval School, the nation's second-oldest military college.

With the establishment of the Historic Annapolis Foundation, as well as Annapolis Historic District Design Guidelines for New Construction, written by Robert Lamb Hart of Hart Howerton, the future of the city's historical heritage of the Colonial and Federal eras with its Georgian and Federal period with its unique architecture was assured of a constant "watchdog" over any future abuses and neglect as occasionally occurred during the quiet years of the 19th and early 20th Centuries.

The Colonial Annapolis Maritime Trail System is a part of the East Coast Greenway.

== See also ==
- List of National Historic Landmarks in Maryland
- National Register of Historic Places listings in Anne Arundel County, Maryland
