= Turkey Hill =

Turkey Hill may refer to:

- Turkey Hill Dairy, American food company
- Turkey Hill Minit Markets, American chain of convenience stores
- Turkey Hill (Linthicum Heights, Maryland), historic house
- Turkey Hill (Pennsylvania), hill in Columbia County

== See also ==
- Turkey Mountain (disambiguation)
