= Turkey Mountain =

Turkey Mountain may refer to:

- Turkey Mountain (Georgia)
- Turkey Mountain (New York)
- Turkey Mountain (Oklahoma)
- Turkey Mountains (New Mexico)

== See also ==
- Turkey Hill (disambiguation)
