= Marley Neck Rosenwald School =

- U.S. National Register of Historic Places
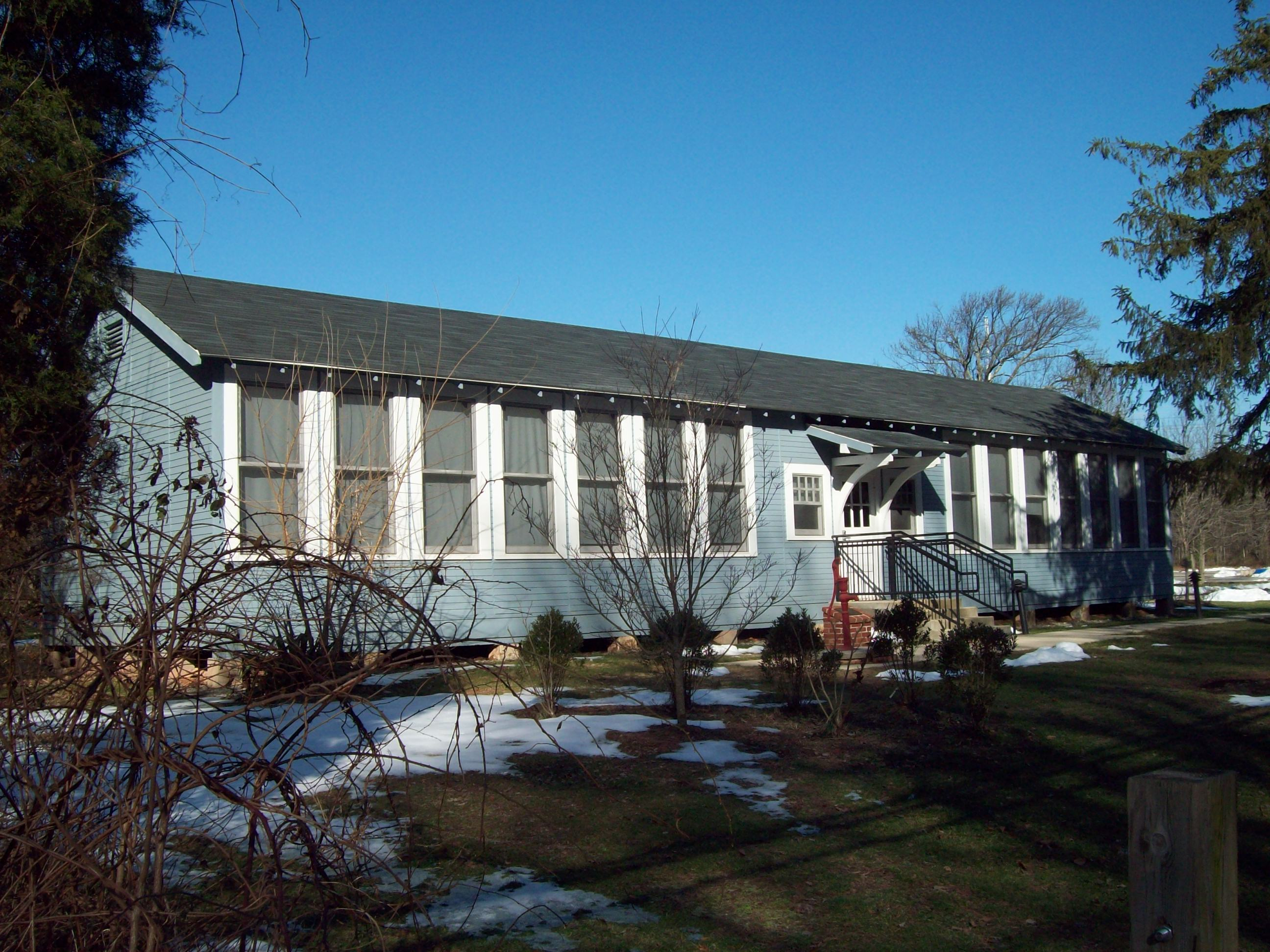

- Location within Maryland Location within the United States
- Location: 7780 Solley Rd., Glen Burnie, Maryland
- Coordinates: 39°9′51″N 76°33′53″W
- Area: 4.7 acres (1.9 ha)
- Built: 1927
- Architectural style: Rosenwald School
- MPS: Rosenwald Schools of Anne Arundel County, Maryland MPS
- NRHP reference No.: 05000630
- Added to NRHP: June 24, 2005

The Marley Neck Rosenwald School is a historic school building located at 7780 Solley Road in Glen Burnie, Maryland. It is a single story wood-frame structure measuring 68 by 20 feet (20.7 m × 6.1 m), with a gable roof. The school was built in 1927 with design and funding assistance from the Rosenwald Fund, and served the area's African-American students. Out of the original twenty three built, it is one of the ten surviving Rosenwald schools in the county.

The building was listed on the National Register of Historic Places in 2005. It was used as a church hall then.

Starting around 2008, the building became a community center, intended to offer after-school programs, health care screening, tutoring, and other social services and activities.

== See also ==
- National Register of Historic Places in Anne Arundel County, Maryland
