= Citizens State Bank (Odenton, Maryland) =

Historic place in Maryland, United States

- U.S. National Register of Historic Places
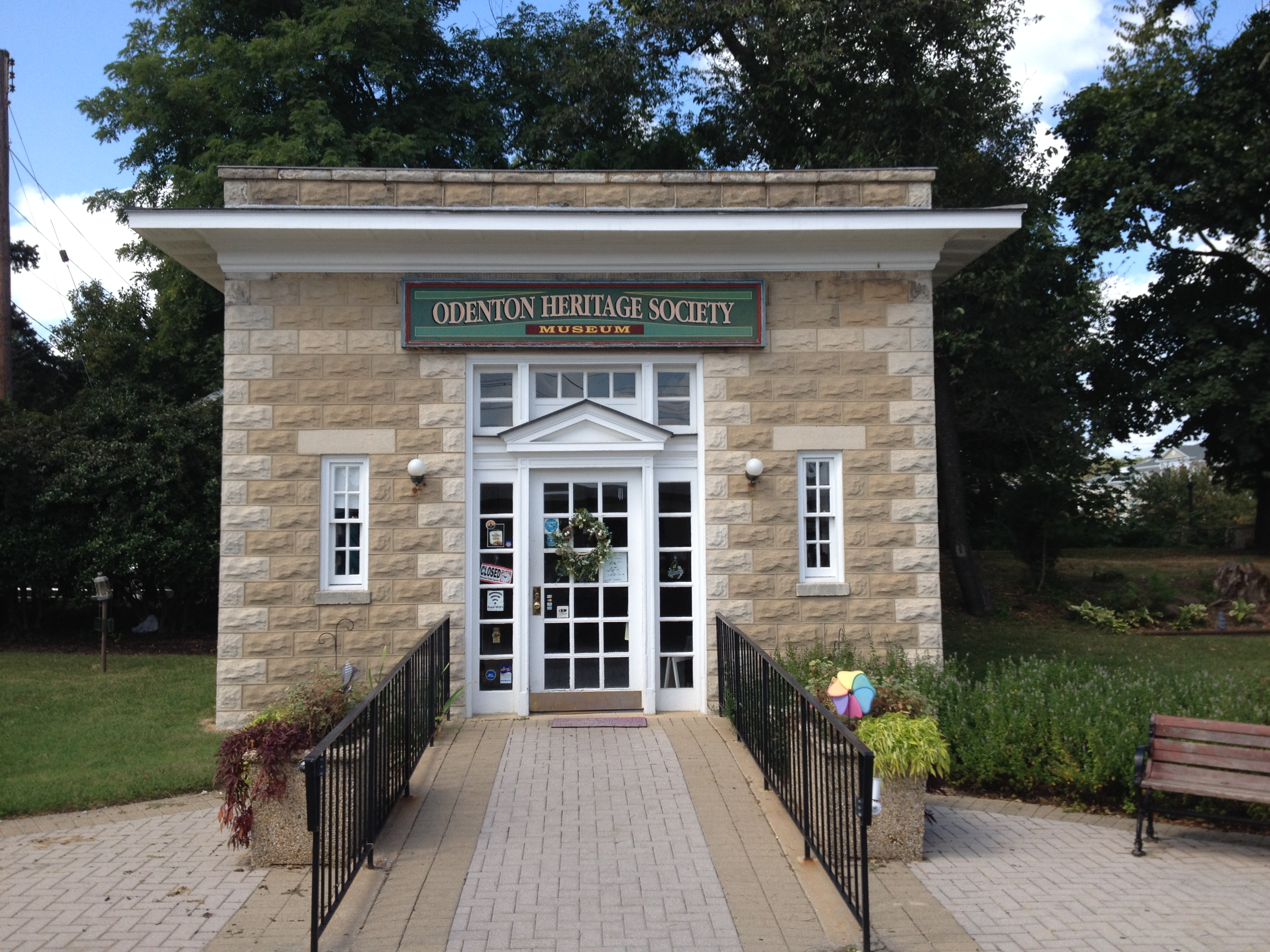
- Front view of old Citizens State Bank building, now Odenton Heritage Society School in Odenton, MD

- Location within Maryland Location within the United States
- Location: 1402 Odenton Road, Odenton, Maryland
- Coordinates: 39°5′13.9″N 76°42′23.9″W
- Built: 1917
- Architectural style: Classical Revival
- NRHP reference No.: 13000967
- Added to NRHP: December 24, 2013

The Citizens State Bank is a historic bank building at 1402 Odenton Road in Odenton, Maryland. It is now a local history museum operated by the Odenton Heritage Society. The single story Classical Revival masonry building was built in 1917 to serve the military population of nearby Camp Meade, which had been established as a cantonment for the First World War. The bank provided many soldiers with financial services, as Odenton was an off-base destination for social activities, and the bank was located near the train station. It only operated until February 8, 1918, when it was closed due to lack of funds. The building was next used as a shop, and was moved in 1945 to make room for a new train station (the present station). After the war it was converted for use as a parcel post service office, which closed in 1966. The Odenton Heritage Society acquired the building in 1989 and restored it.

The building was listed on the National Register of Historic Places in 2013.

== See also ==
- National Register of Historic Places listings in Anne Arundel County, Maryland
