= Norman's Retreat =

Historic house in Maryland, United States

- U.S. National Register of Historic Places
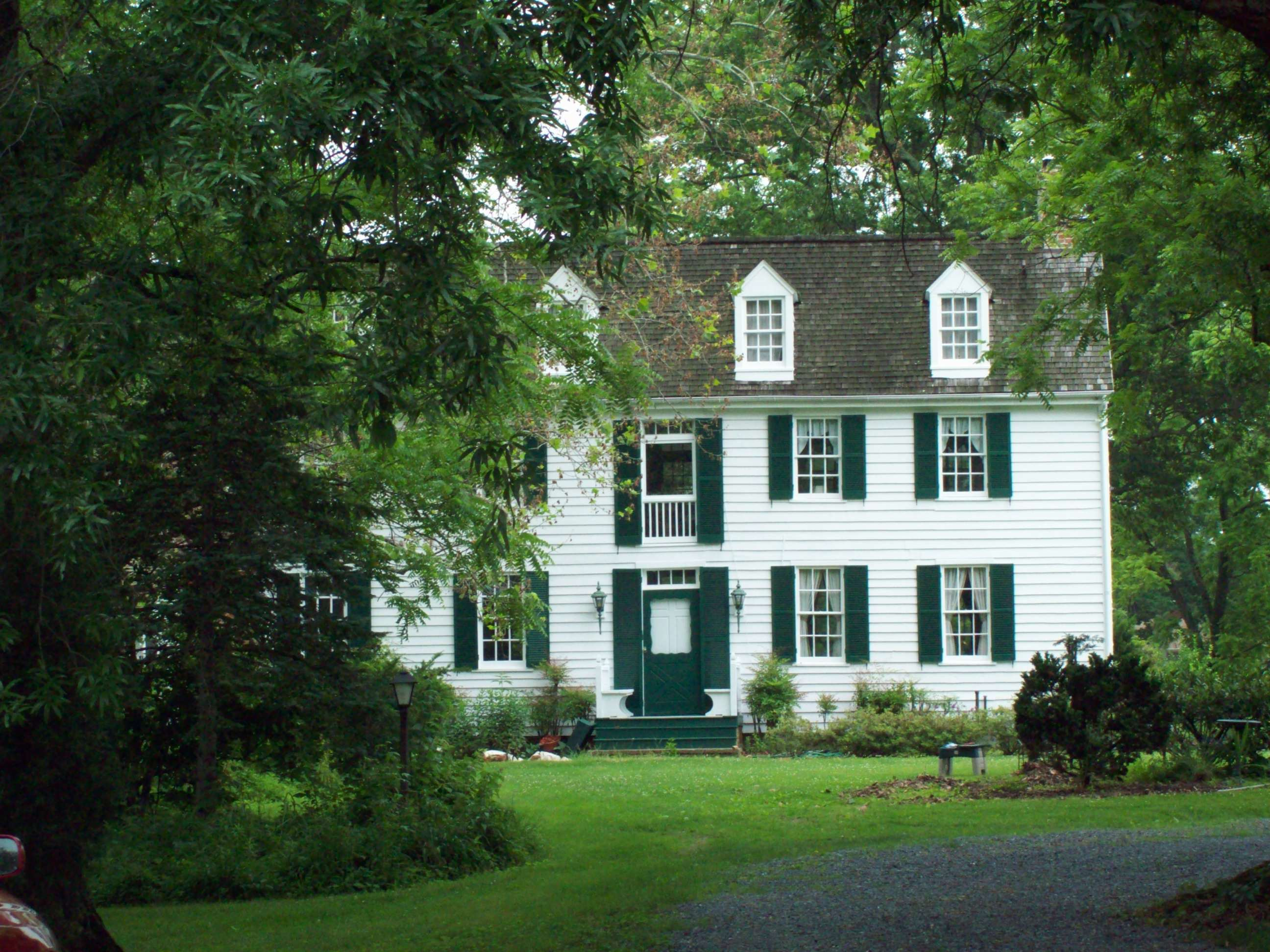
- Norman's Retreat, May 2010

- Location within Maryland Location within the United States
- Nearest city: Galesville, Maryland
- Coordinates: 38.82639°N 76.54822°W
- Area: 5 acres (2.0 ha)
- Built: 1812
- NRHP reference No.: 84001345
- Added to NRHP: September 7, 1984

Norman's Retreat is a historic home and farm complex at Galesville, Anne Arundel County, Maryland. It consists of an early-19th-century dwelling, three 19th-century outbuildings, and a bath house and gazebo of recent date. The 2 1/2-story house was constructed about 1812 and is of frame construction with a brick gable end.

It was listed on the National Register of Historic Places in 1984.
