= Tulip Hill =

Historic house in Maryland, United States

- U.S. National Register of Historic Places
- U.S. National Historic Landmark
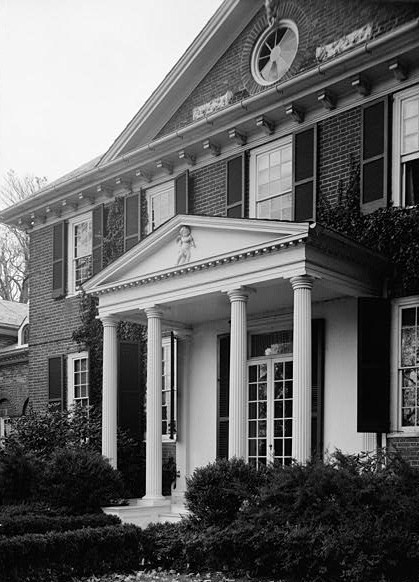

- Location within Maryland Location within the United States
- Nearest city: Galesville, Maryland
- Coordinates: 38°51′3″N 76°33′2″W
- Built: 1755
- Architect: John Deavour
- Architectural style: Georgian
- NRHP reference No.: 70000261

Significant dates
- Added to NRHP: April 15, 1970
- Designated NHL: April 15, 1970

Tulip Hill is a plantation house located about one mile from Galesville in Anne Arundel County in the Province of Maryland. Built between 1755 and 1756, it is a particularly fine example of an early Georgian mansion, and was designated a National Historic Landmark in 1970 for its architecture.

The house sits atop a ridge and overlooks the West River. The house was built by Samuel Galloway for his wife, Ann (Chew) Galloway. They married in 1742.

== The land ==
The land for Tulip Hill originally was patented to Richard Talbot in 1659 as "Poplar Knowl." The house sits on a ridge from which terraces paralleling the river lead down to the meadow.

== The house ==
According to an entry in the builder's account book, all of the bricks used to build the house were made on the site. Between 1787 and 1790, the Georgian style plantation house was expanded with end pavilions to become a five-part house. The site retains its tree-lined entrance lane and terraced garden. The curious gambrel or double-hipped roof is set off by a pediment with a bull's-eye window and dormers on the rear. A well defined cornice and a small white pedimented porch with four columns shading the front door add dignity to the facade. The central block is two stories high and 52 feet (16 m) wide by 42 feet (13 m) deep. Windows are nine-over-nine sashes, with the second floor windows somewhat smaller than the first. The brickwork is laid in Flemish bond. Two unusual fireplaces brick chimneys, with multiple flues, project through either end of the central portion of the house and tower over the one story wings. The two-story end pavilions and one story hyphens have brickwork in running bond.

A spacious hall runs the depth of the house with a large double arch dividing it equally. The front half has a chair rail and corner cupboard while the other half contains the staircase. The hall, while in the middle of the house, is not centered, being offset to the right and lit by the window to the right of the entrance door. The hall narrows at the stair hall, which contains an unusually fine curved walnut staircase. To the right of the hall, in front, is a small reception room with a larger dining room behind, connected by a narrow hall with a service stair. On the left side of the hall are two paneled drawing rooms. The second floor is similarly arranged, except that a small chamber occupies the end of the hall opposite the stairs. The two large eastern bedrooms are paneled.

The west wing contained a kitchen, while the east wing contained plantation offices.

== Description ==
Located at the edge of a high plateau, with the land falling rapidly away on three sides, Tulip Hill is a five-part composition with a full stone basement under the entire structure. The central block, two full stories, with a high unfinished attic and double hipped roof, is 52 feet wide and 42 feet deep. The two brick end wings, built at right angles to the main axis and measuring 20 x 24 feet, are two stories of lower height than the main house. Both have gabled roofs with a single chimney located in the center of the outer side walls. The two brick connecting hyphens or curtains, each 19 x 19 feet, are of one story with very low attic space and are covered with gable roofs that have small dormers. The walls are decorated with brick pilasters which extend to the height of the windows where they visibly support the brick stringcourse. The roof of the central unit is dormered on the rear, or river elevation and on the ends. The brick walls of the main house are laid in Flemish bond and the walls of the wings and hyphens are laid in running bond. The central unit has a rolled brick water table and a belt course at the second floor level. Over this unit rises two high, arched and vaulted chimneys, somewhat reminiscent of the more massive stacks at Stafford, Virginia (1725–1730). The north or land façade of Tulip Hill is particularly interesting because of its somewhat experimental approach to late Georgian formality. There is a central pediment but no projecting pavilion beneath it. A round window with unusual flanking decorative panels adorns the pediment, and the main cornice is modillion in front only. The center door is topped by a rectangular transom, sheltered by a one-story portico that was probably added about 1787–1790. The pediment of the porch, supported by four columns, contains a carved figure of Cupid. The brick wall between the end pilasters of the portico is plastered and painted. Over the rear center door is an interesting cantilevered hood carried on boldly projecting carved consoles, plastered inside its arched head and adorned by curious crockets on its raking cornices. It has a carved conventionalized tulip as its finial. This recalls, in a more elaborate form, the plainer town pents used over many doorways in Philadelphia. Windows on both floors of the central block have nine over nine light sashes, but those on the second floor are reduced in height.

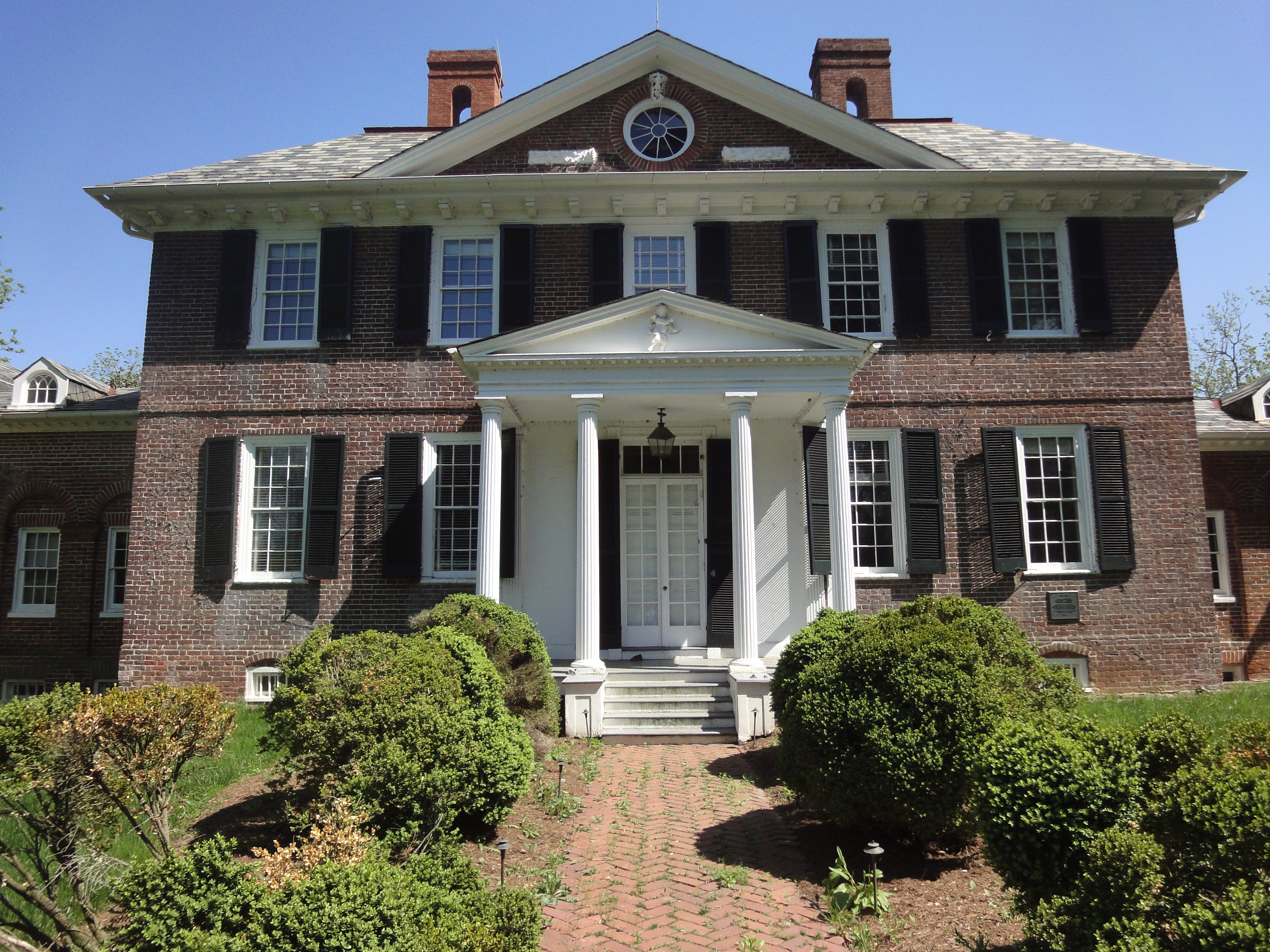
Tulip Hill in 2010

In plan, a broad un-paneled off-center front hall is lighted from the window to the right of the front (north) door. The fully paneled stair hall at the rear is narrower on axis. In this rear hall is an exceptionally fine carved walnut staircase, with scrolled step ends and handrail, winding around an offset newel post in the bottom. Paneling on the wall echoes the contour of its gracefully curved banister and fluted end posts. A visual separation between front and rear hall is achieved by an unusual double arch without a supporting post in the middle. The free hanging impost of the arches is adorned by a tulip ornament and hanging candle light, not unlike the carved pendant in a similar position in Gunston Hall, Virginia, designed b William Buckland at this sale time. To the right of the stair is a very fine corner cupboard with a large carved shell ornament. To the right of the front hall is a small un-paneled reception room and in the rear, also to the right of the stair hall, is a larger un-paneled dining room. These two rooms are connected by a small passage from which, against the interior chimney, arises an extremely narrow service stair, as at Stenton.

Tulip Hill and Stenton seem to be the only houses of their time and dimensions in which this feature is found. Galloway spent much time in Philadelphia with his relatives, the Chews of Cliveden, and friends, the Logans of Stenton. On the left side of the center hall ase two large and fully paneled drawing rooms, each about 20 by 17 feet in size.

The first floor plan is repeated on the second floor, except that an additional room, a small chamber, is located at the end of the hall. The two large bedrooms on the east side of the hall are fully paneled. The fireplaces in the central block are faced with either Dutch tile or marble and are framed with wood paneling. The windows have jeep paneled jambs and soffits, with architraves to the floor. The jambs are splayed and there are deep window seats. The doors, paneling, floorboards, and stair treads are of pine. Most of the hardware is original. The west (right) wing contained the kitchen and service rooms, and the east wing, the plantation office. Before construction of the wings, kitchen and other services areas were located in outbuildings as confirmed in Galloway's papers. Today only the foundations of the old ice house, which is partly supporting the garage, exist. The house was little altered during the nineteenth century and has never undergone extensive restoration.

The boundary of Tulip Hill has been drawn to include all of the remaining land, about 54 ½ acres. This includes both the original river approach from the house and terraced gardens to the West River and the original land approach through a gateway on the old Muddy Creek Road, now State Route 468 and part of a system of roads established around 1695 as Annapolis developed. The curving drive still winds through many original poplar, fir, and beechwood trees to the house.

== History ==
Samuel Galloway bought Poplar Knowle in 1755, renaming it "Tulip Hill" after a grove of tulip poplars. The central portion of the house was built in 1755–56, supervised by John Devour. The house resembles "Stenton" in Germantown, Pennsylvania, built by Galloway's friend James Logan. Samuel's son John enlarged the house in 1787-1790 by adding the end wings, hyphens and portico. The house remained in the Galloway family until 1866.

In 1771, a thirty-nine-year-old George Washington "dined and supped" at Tulip Hill twice.

One of the young Galloway children is reputed to have ridden his horse up the central staircase.

=== Inheritance ===
In 1786, Samual Galloway died and left Tulip Hill to his son, John Galloway. Upon John's death, the house passed to his only child, Mary (Galloway) Maxcy. Her husband was Virgil Maxcy, the Minister to Belgium under President Martin Van Buren. Mary Maxcy left Tulip Hill to her only daughter, Ann Sarah Hughes. In 1886, Hughes sold the house to Henry M. Murray. Murray's wife, Mary H. (Morris) Murray, was a descendant of the builder of the house. The Murrays lived in Tulip Hill for thirty years before selling it to A. du Pont Parker, of Denver, Colorado. Ultimately the house passed on to Mr. and Mrs. Henry H. Flather of Washington, DC, and it was the Flathers who spent a great deal of time and money restoring Tulip Hill and the surrounding grounds to the former level of magnificence. The home is still privately owned. As of March 2010, the house was for sale.

=== Sale history ===
In 2011, Tulip Hill was sold at auction by Concierge Auctions and Long & Foster Real Estate, Inc. The sale price was $2.5 million.

== See also ==
- Dodon
- Grassland (Annapolis Junction, Maryland)
- Hammond-Harwood House (Annapolis, Maryland)
- Holly Hill (Friendship, Maryland)
- Maidstone (Owings, Maryland)
- Oakwood (Harwood, Maryland)
- Twin Oaks (Linthicum Heights, Maryland)
- Whitehall (Annapolis, Maryland)
- White's Hall

== Bibliography ==
- Swann Jr., Don (1975). Colonial and Historic Homes of Maryland. Baltimore and London: Johns Hopkins University Press. p. 212. ISBN 0-8018-1727-7.
