= Skipworth's Addition =

- U.S. National Register of Historic Places
- Location: Address Restricted, Harwood, Maryland
- Area: 1.8 acres (0.73 ha)
- MPS: Quaker Sites in the West River Meeting, Anne Arundel County, Maryland c. 1650-1785
- NRHP reference No.: 08001216
- Added to NRHP: December 22, 2008

Skipworth's Addition is an archaeological site located near Harwood, Anne Arundel County, Maryland. It was identified in 1990 when the owners of the property unearthed several large pieces of North Devon pottery. Later excavation produced 17th-century artifacts, including glass, tobacco pipes, nails, refined earthenwares, and coarse ceramics, which confirm this site to be that of Skipworth's Addition. The site is located within the bounds of the 1664 patent "The Addition," which was issued in December 1662 to George Skipworth (also - Skipwith, Skipwirth) for an 18-acre (73,000 m^{2}) tract. The Skipwiths were active members of the Quaker community and hosted a half-year Meeting for Men in their home at Skipworth's Addition in 1680.

It was listed on the National Register of Historic Places in 2008.
