= Beck Northeast Site =

- Beck Northeast Site (18AN65)
- U.S. National Register of Historic Places
- Nearest city: Davidsonville, Maryland
- NRHP reference No.: 86000003
- Added to NRHP: January 2, 1986

The Beck Northeast Site is an archaeological site near Davidsonville in Anne Arundel County, Maryland. This site was discovered in the 1930s and investigations since that time have revealed artifacts dating from the Late Archaic period through the Middle Woodland period.

It was listed on the National Register of Historic Places in 1986.
