= House by the "Town Gates" =

Historic house in Maryland, United States

- U.S. National Register of Historic Places
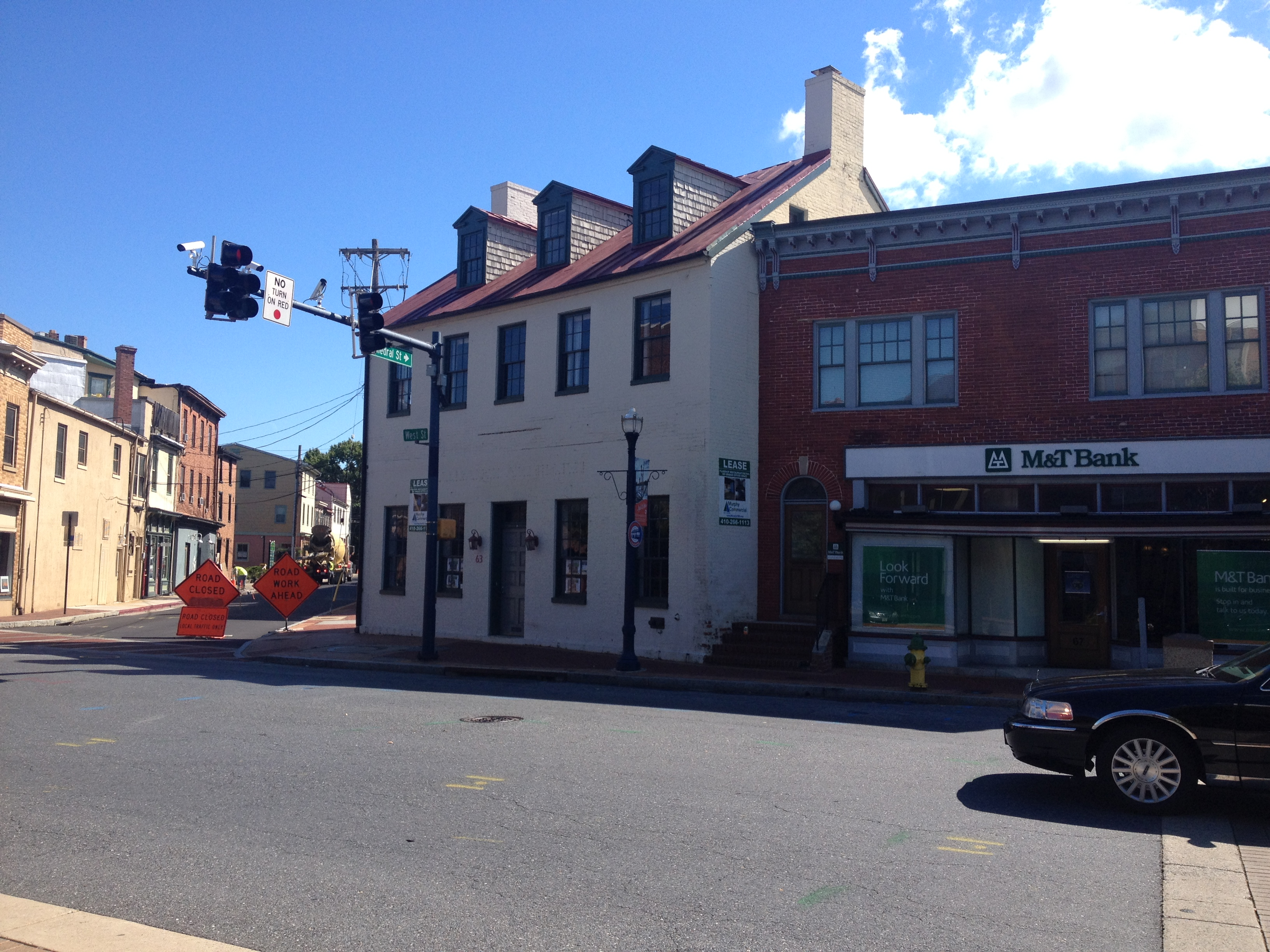

- Location within Maryland Location within the United States
- Location: 63 West St., Annapolis, Maryland
- Coordinates: 38°58′41.3″N 76°29′44.8″W
- Architectural style: Federal
- NRHP reference No.: 73000890
- Added to NRHP: June 19, 1973

The House by the "Town Gates" is a historic home in Annapolis, Anne Arundel County, Maryland. It is a large and imposing brick building, 2½ stories high and five bays wide. It was originally constructed in the second quarter of the 19th century as a single-family dwelling, later converted into commercial spaces by the latter part of that century. The alley along the west side of the building is the only undisturbed example of original cobblestone paving known in Annapolis.

It was listed on the National Register of Historic Places in 1973.
