= John Callahan House =

Historic house in Maryland, United States

- U.S. National Register of Historic Places
- U.S. Historic district – Contributing property
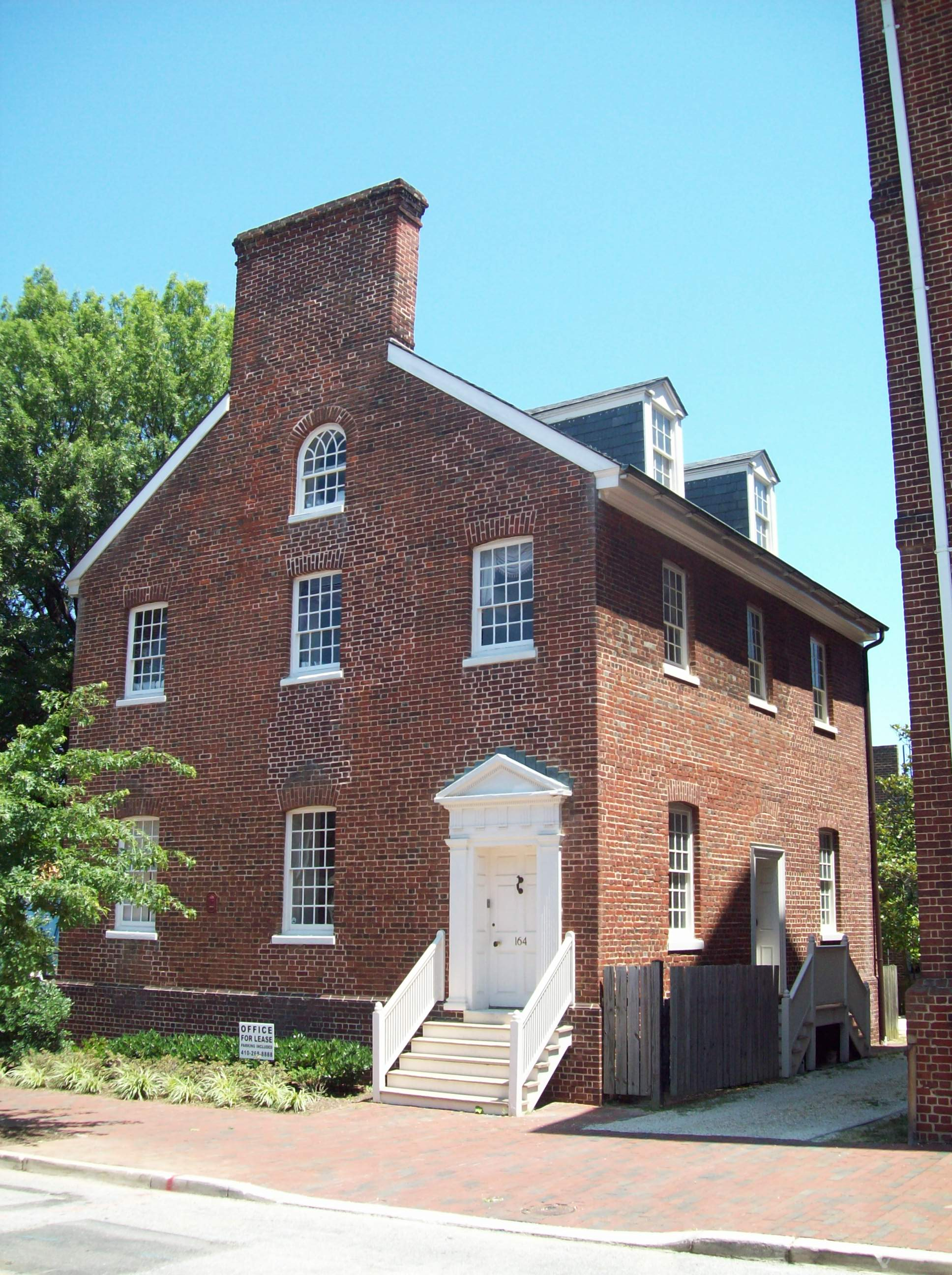
- John Callahan House, July 2009

- Location within Maryland Location within the United States
- Location: 164 Conduit St., Annapolis, Maryland
- Coordinates: 38°58′38.4″N 76°29′24.2″W
- Area: 0 acres (0 ha)
- Built: 1785
- NRHP reference No.: 73000888
- Added to NRHP: October 2, 1973

John Callahan House, known previously as Pinkney-Callahan House when it was located on St. John Street, is a historic home in Annapolis, Maryland, United States. The brick home was constructed by John Callahan (c. 1754–1803), a prominent and wealthy Annapolitan who served as the Register of the Western Shore Land Office between 1778 and 1803, around 1785–90. It has been moved twice in efforts to prevent its demolition. In 1900–01, the house was relocated to St. John's Street and then to its present site on Conduit Street in 1972. The home features an unusual gable-end principal façade and a largely intact Georgian/Federal interior finishes. It once served as St. John's College Infirmary.

It was first listed on the National Register of Historic Places on November 12, 1971 (NRHP Reference Number 71000365); after its relocation in 1972, it was listed again in 1973. It is a contributing property in the Colonial Annapolis Historic District.
