= Stanton Center =

- U.S. National Register of Historic Places
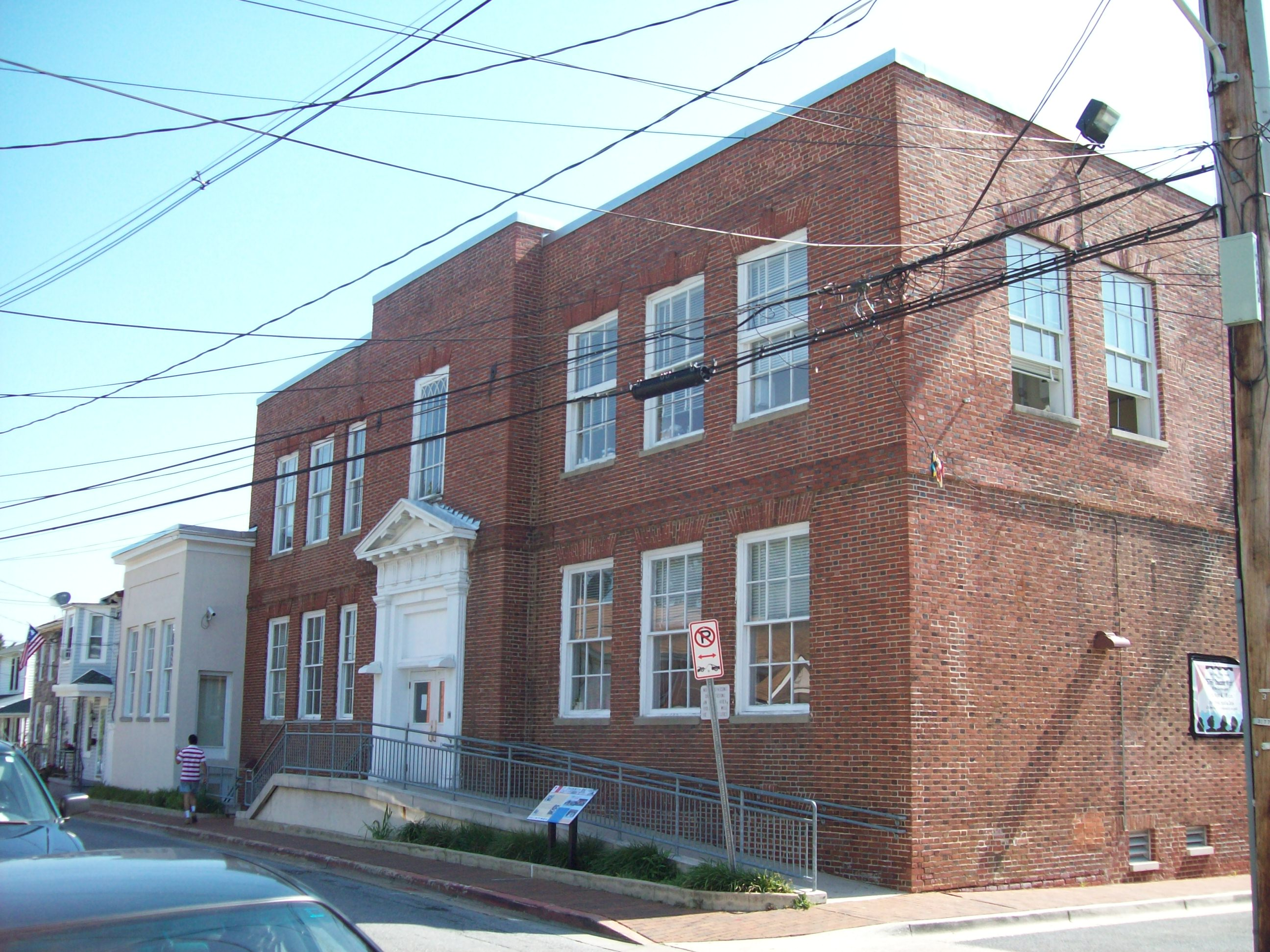
- Stanton Center, July 2009

- Location within Maryland Location within the United States
- Location: 92 W. Washington St., Annapolis, Maryland
- Coordinates: 38°58′48.5″N 76°29′46.8″W
- Built: 1893
- NRHP reference No.: 83003627
- Added to NRHP: December 1, 1983

Stanton Center is a historic building at Annapolis, Anne Arundel County, Maryland, United States. It is a two-story (plus basement), Classical Revival brick masonry building with a one-story addition. It is the second school building on the site and was first used as an elementary school and later became the first high school for African Americans in Anne Arundel County. It remained in use as a school until the desegregation of the Anne Arundel County school system in the 1960s, when it became a community center.

Stanton Center was listed on the National Register of Historic Places in 1983.
