= Burrages End =

Historic house in Maryland, United States

- U.S. National Register of Historic Places
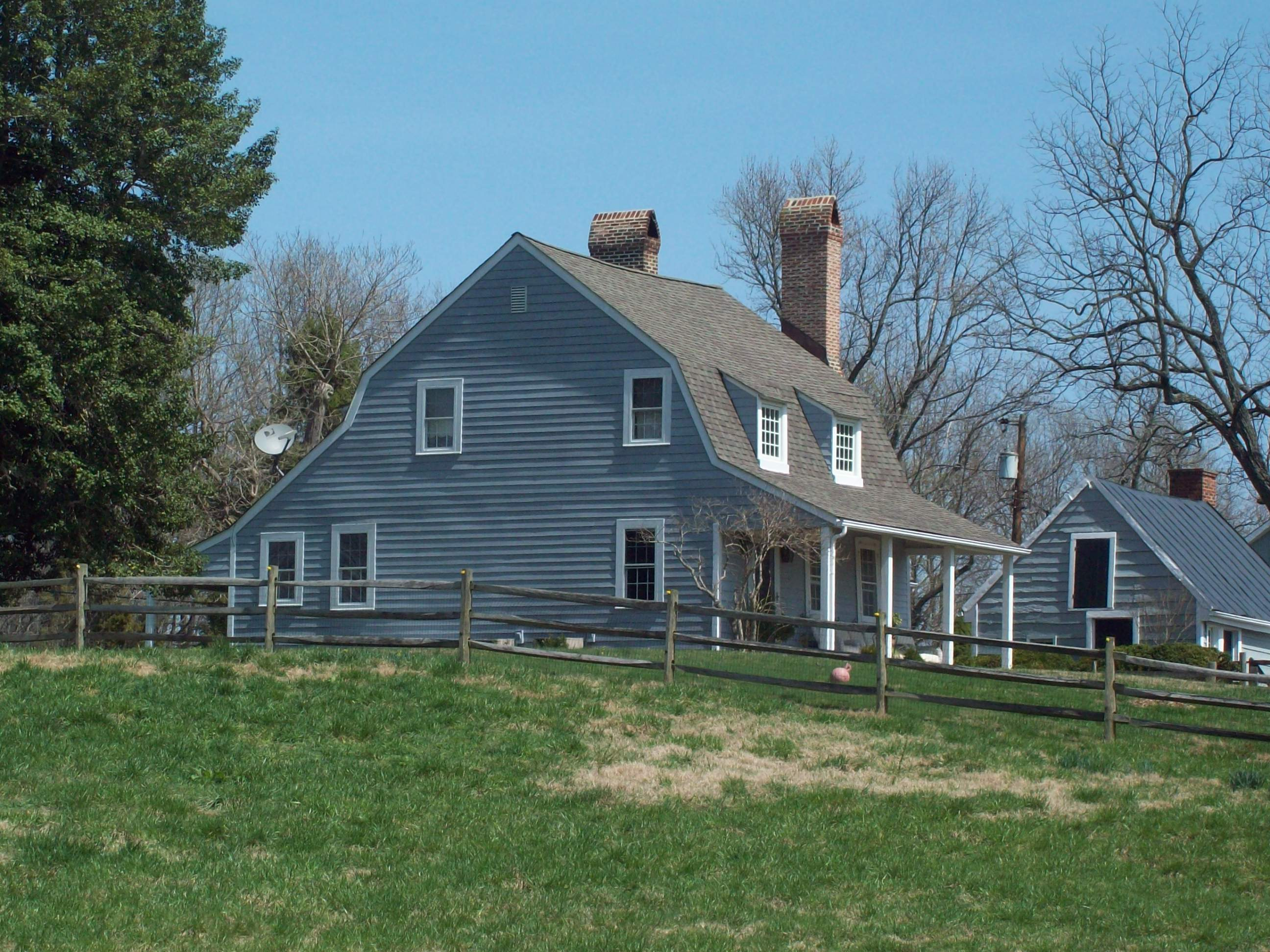
- Burrages End, March 2010

- Location within Maryland Location within the United States
- Location: Nutwell Rd. off Maryland Route 2, Lothian, Maryland
- Coordinates: 38°47′59″N 76°35′47″W
- Area: 50 acres (20 ha)
- NRHP reference No.: 73000897
- Added to NRHP: April 11, 1973

Burrages End is a historic home near Lothian, Anne Arundel County, Maryland, United States. It is a small 1 1/2-story frame house with gambrel roof. The site is noteworthy for containing a number of buildings from the late 18th century or early 19th century. The house was constructed c. 1780, replacing an earlier house on the site, according to a 1982 study by the Architectural Research Department of the Colonial Williamsburg Foundation, presumably by Col. John Weems who purchased the property in 1764. Weems was the construction contractor for the 1762-65 St. James' Church 3/4 mile to the south. At Weems' death in 1794, Burrages End was sold to Thomas Sellman and remained in that family's hands until 1946. A Weems-Sellman cemetery is on site.

Historic outbuildings include a slave quarter and a tobacco barn. In the late 1700s, Major John Welsh built a hall-and-parlor plan house with a "new hall" addition, both replaced c. 1780. "Although often assigned a late 17th century date, the present dwelling is a later house, built c. 1780." The property was patented in 1665 to John Burrage, who sold it to Welsh in 1668.

Burrages End was listed on the National Register of Historic Places in 1973.
