= Universal Lodge No. 14 =

Historic building in Maryland, USA

- U.S. National Register of Historic Places
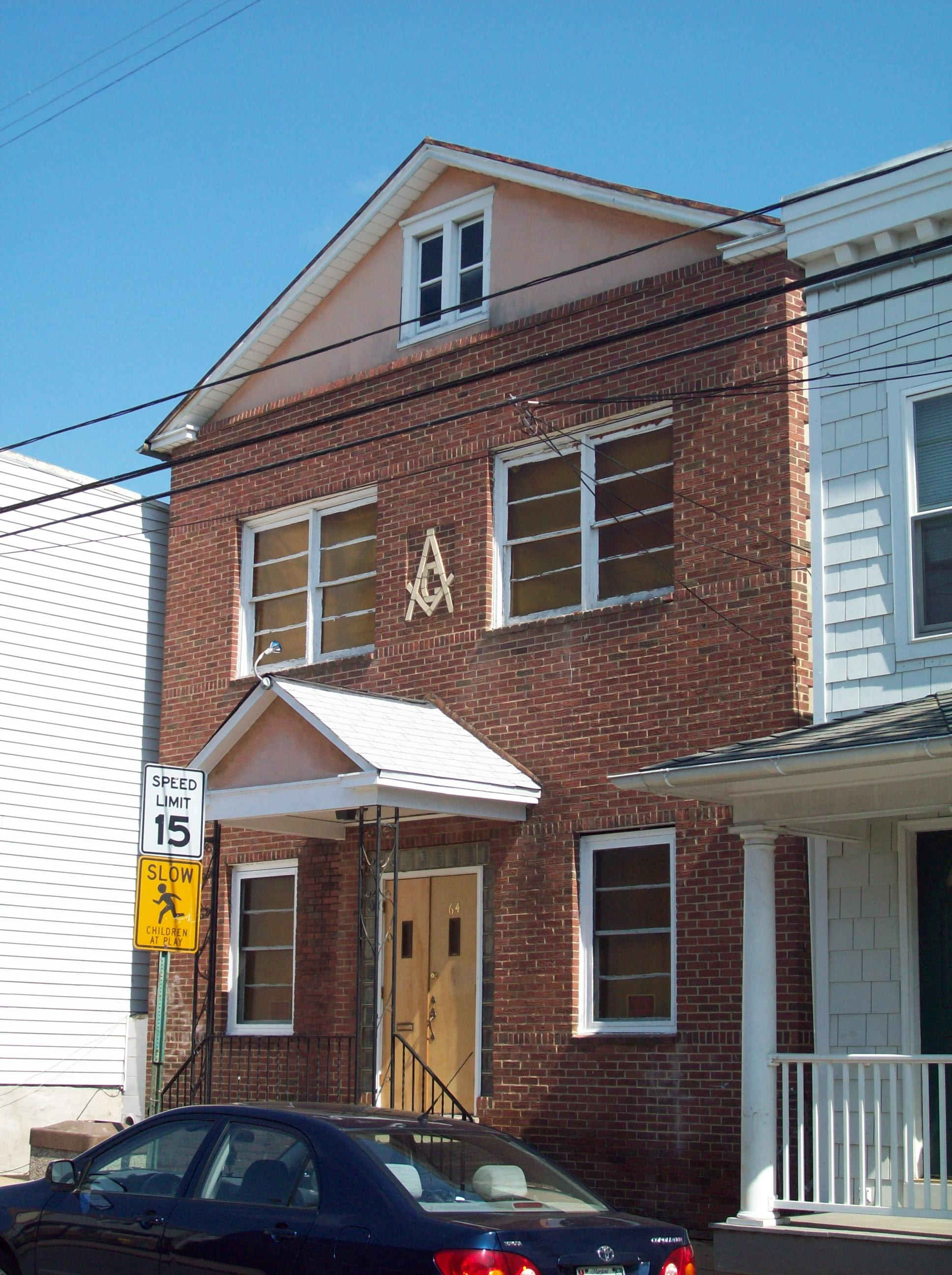
- Universal Lodge No. 14, July 2009

- Location within Maryland Location within the United States
- Location: 64 Clay St. Annapolis, Maryland, U.S.
- Coordinates: 38°58′54″N 76°29′49″W
- Area: less than one acre
- Built: 1865
- Architectural style: Colonial Revival
- NRHP reference No.: 08001101
- Added to NRHP: November 26, 2008

Universal Lodge No. 14 is a historic building located in Annapolis, Anne Arundel County, Maryland. It was constructed about 1880 as a private dwelling, and substantially expanded in the mid-1950s. It is a two-story gable-front frame and concrete-block building with a brick veneer facade and a gable finished in stucco. It was listed on the National Register of Historic Places in 2008.

The Prince Hall Masonic Lodge for which it is named was founded in 1865 by a group of African American civilian employees of the U.S. Naval Academy. The lodge purchased the building in the 1940s, and substantially renovated it for use as a meeting hall over the next decade.

In 2019 a $200,000 grant was secured to repair the exterior of the building.
