= Sunnyfields (Linthicum Heights, Maryland) =

Historic house in Maryland, United States

- U.S. National Register of Historic Places
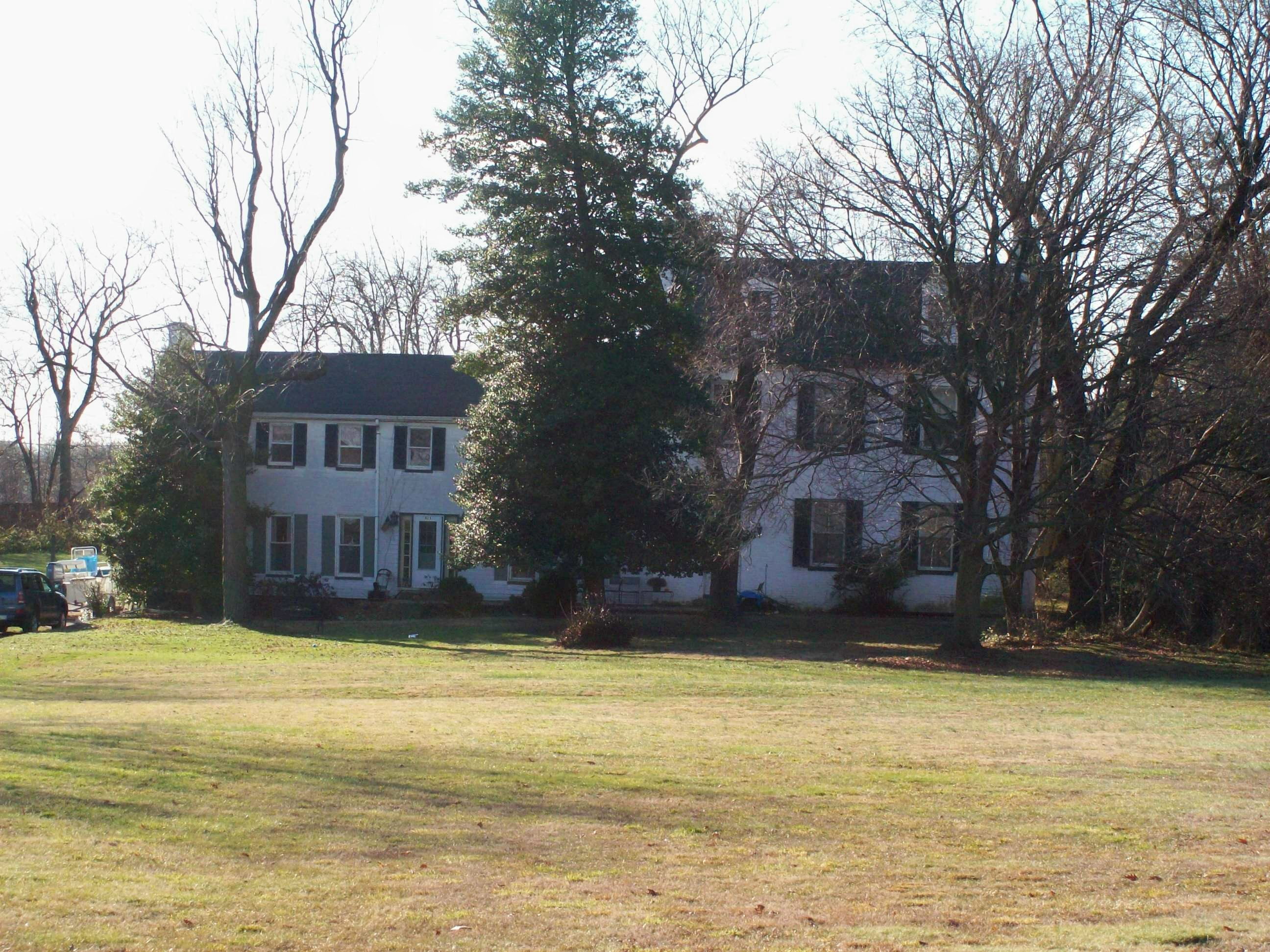
- Sunnyfields, December 2009

- Location within Maryland Location within the United States
- Location: 825 Hammonds Lane, Brooklyn Park, Maryland
- Coordinates: 39°12′32″N 76°38′0″W
- Area: 1.5 acres (0.61 ha)
- Built: 1785
- Architectural style: Colonial, Federal, High Style Federal
- NRHP reference No.: 83002923
- Added to NRHP: August 11, 1983

Sunnyfields is a historic home at Linthicum Heights, Anne Arundel County, Maryland, United States. It is partially brick, two and a half stories tall and three bays wide, and was built in 1810. The east portion is of frame construction, six bays long, and two stories high and dates from about 1785. It has characteristics from several periods of Maryland architecture: pre-Federal vernacular (original frame wing), high style Federal (brick wing), and early-20th century mass-produced Classical Revival (columns and stair added in pre-Federal portion).

Sunnyfields was listed on the National Register of Historic Places in 1983.
