= Abington Farm =

Historic house in Maryland

- Abbington Manor
- U.S. National Register of Historic Places
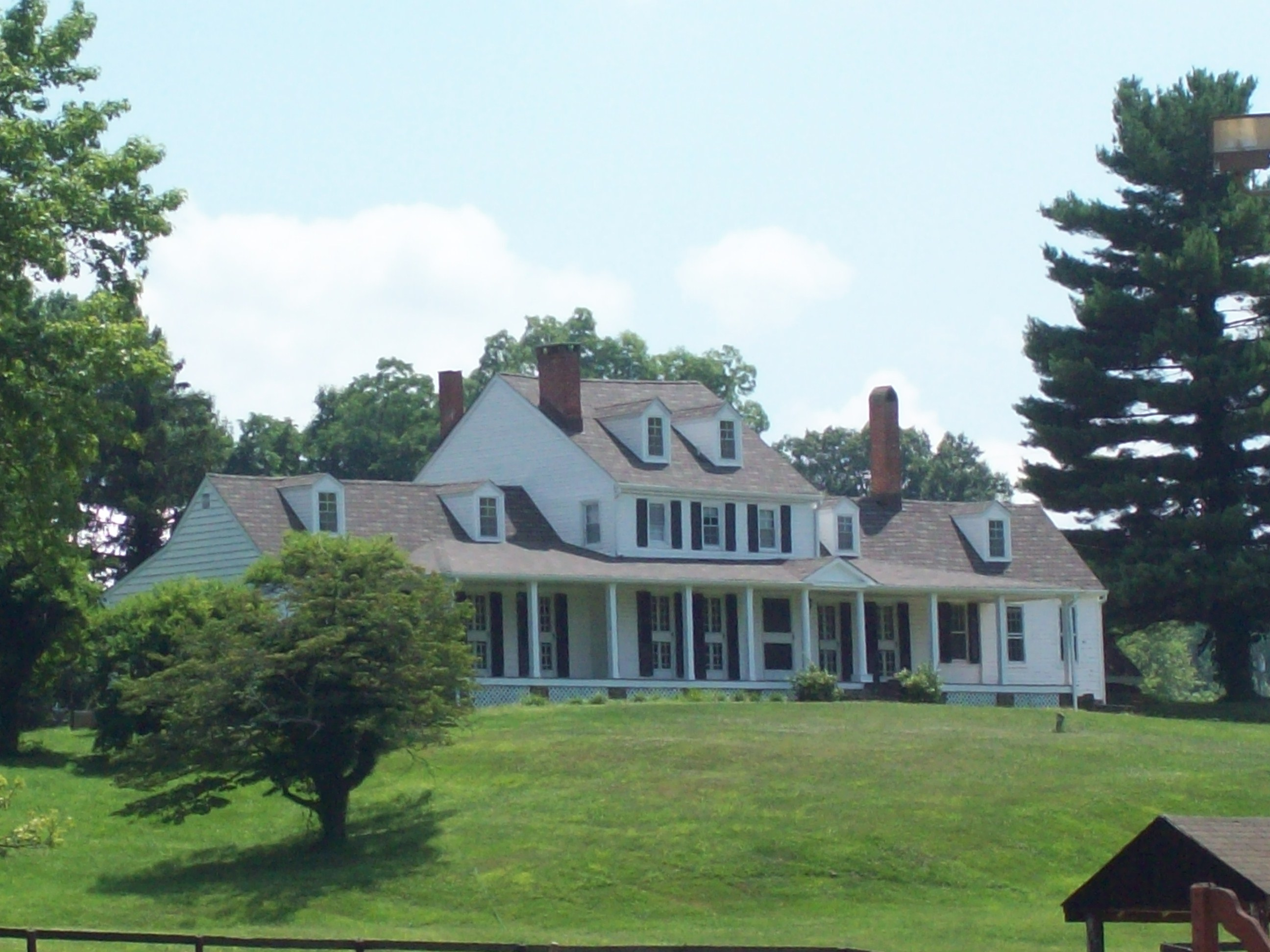
- Abbington Farm, July 2009

- Location within Maryland Location within the United States
- Nearest city: Millersville, Maryland
- Coordinates: 39°2′20″N 76°38′59″W
- Built: 1840
- NRHP reference No.: 84001328
- Added to NRHP: September 13, 1984

The Abington Farm, or Abbington Manor & Farm, is a historic home and stables at Crownsville, Anne Arundel County, Maryland, United States. The main house is a 2 1/2-story frame, side-passage, double-pile house with additions on both gable ends. The main block dates from about 1840. On the property are several outbuildings, including a frame summer kitchen; a stone and frame ice house; a frame, brick, and stone springhouse/dairy; a frame privy, chicken house, tool shed, and corncrib; a large, elaborate frame stable; and a frame tenant house.

The Abbington Farm was listed on the National Register of Historic Places in 1984.
