= Burle's Town Land =

- U.S. National Register of Historic Places
- Nearest city: Annapolis, Maryland
- NRHP reference No.: 10001147
- Added to NRHP: January 21, 2011

Burle's Town Land is a colonial archaeological site near Annapolis in Anne Arundel County, Maryland. It was the location of the homestead of Robert Burle, a surveyor who received a 100-acre (40 ha) patent in the area in 1663, including land that he may have been occupying somewhat earlier. Burle built a house and lived there until is death in 1675; his only child, a daughter, married and moved away in 1680, abandoning the property. The property is situated on a terrace above Mill Creek, and is now partly covered by a later cemetery. Archaeological digs have uncovered general outlines of Burle's house, although the evidence is somewhat compromised by grave digging activity above. The site has also yielded significant finds of Dutch ceramics. Burle's residence in the area is associated with the Puritan Providence Colony established across the Severn River where Annapolis is now located.

The site was listed on the National Register of Historic Places in 2011.
