= John Sands House =

Historic house in Maryland, United States

- U.S. National Register of Historic Places
- Location within Maryland Location within the United States
- Location: 130 Prince George St., Annapolis, Maryland
- Coordinates: 38°58′42″N 76°29′10″W
- Built: ca. 1740 - ca.1904
- Architect: Unknown
- NRHP reference No.: 100007260
- Added to NRHP: December 22, 2021

John Sands House is a historic home at Annapolis, Anne Arundel County, Maryland. The original structure was built about 1740, and is a modest frame, gambrel-roof dwelling with early 20th-century finishes. It features a massive central brick chimney with a cap of two bands of projecting courses.

It was listed on the National Register of Historic Places in 2021.
