= Twin Oaks (Linthicum Heights, Maryland) =

Historic house in Maryland, United States

- U.S. National Register of Historic Places
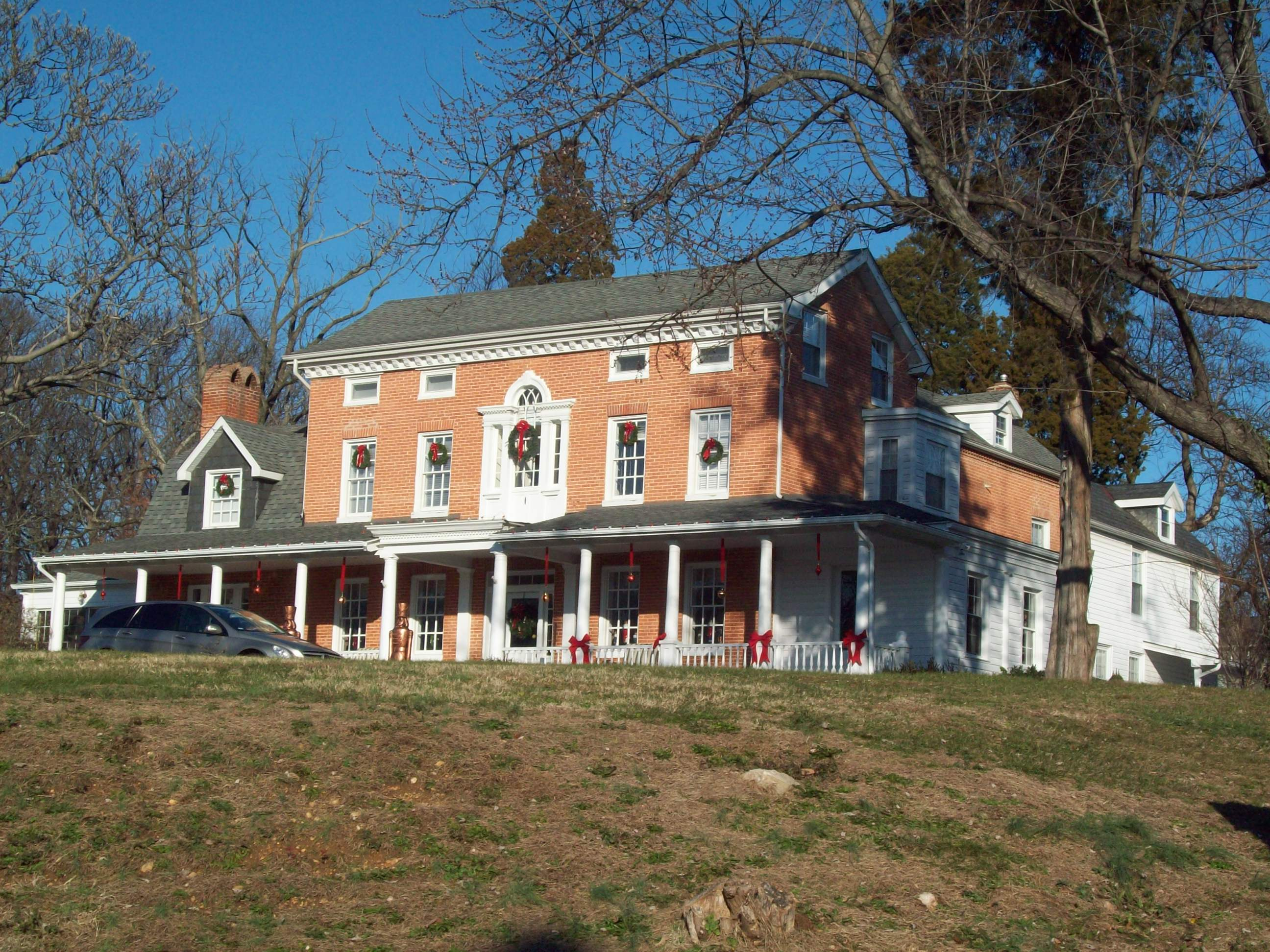
- Twin Oaks, Linthicum Heights, MD, December 2009

- Location within Maryland Location within the United States
- Location: 5910 Oak Twin Ct., Linthicum Heights, Maryland
- Coordinates: 39°12′36″N 76°39′10″W
- Area: 16 acres (6.5 ha)
- Built: 1857
- Architectural style: Colonial Revival, Eclectic Georgian Revival
- NRHP reference No.: 86000670
- Added to NRHP: March 21, 1986

Twin Oaks is a historic home at Linthicum Heights, Anne Arundel County, Maryland, United States. The house is a 2 1/2-story brick Greek Revival–influenced dwelling constructed in 1857, with additions and Neo-Classical embellishments made in the late 19th and early 20th centuries. The final composition is an eclectic, Georgian Revival–influenced dwelling. Twin Oaks was the home of U.S. Congressman John Charles Linthicum, who is noted for sponsoring the legislation which established The Star-Spangled Banner as the United States national anthem. He entertained many dignitaries at Twin Oaks, including William Jennings Bryan and General Douglas MacArthur. Also on the property are a Victorian birdhouse, an aviary, a columned grape arbor, two freestanding concrete-cast columns, and a few pieces of statuary.

Twin Oaks was listed on the National Register of Historic Places in 1986.

== See also ==
- Tulip Hill
