= Galesville, Maryland =

- Census-designated place
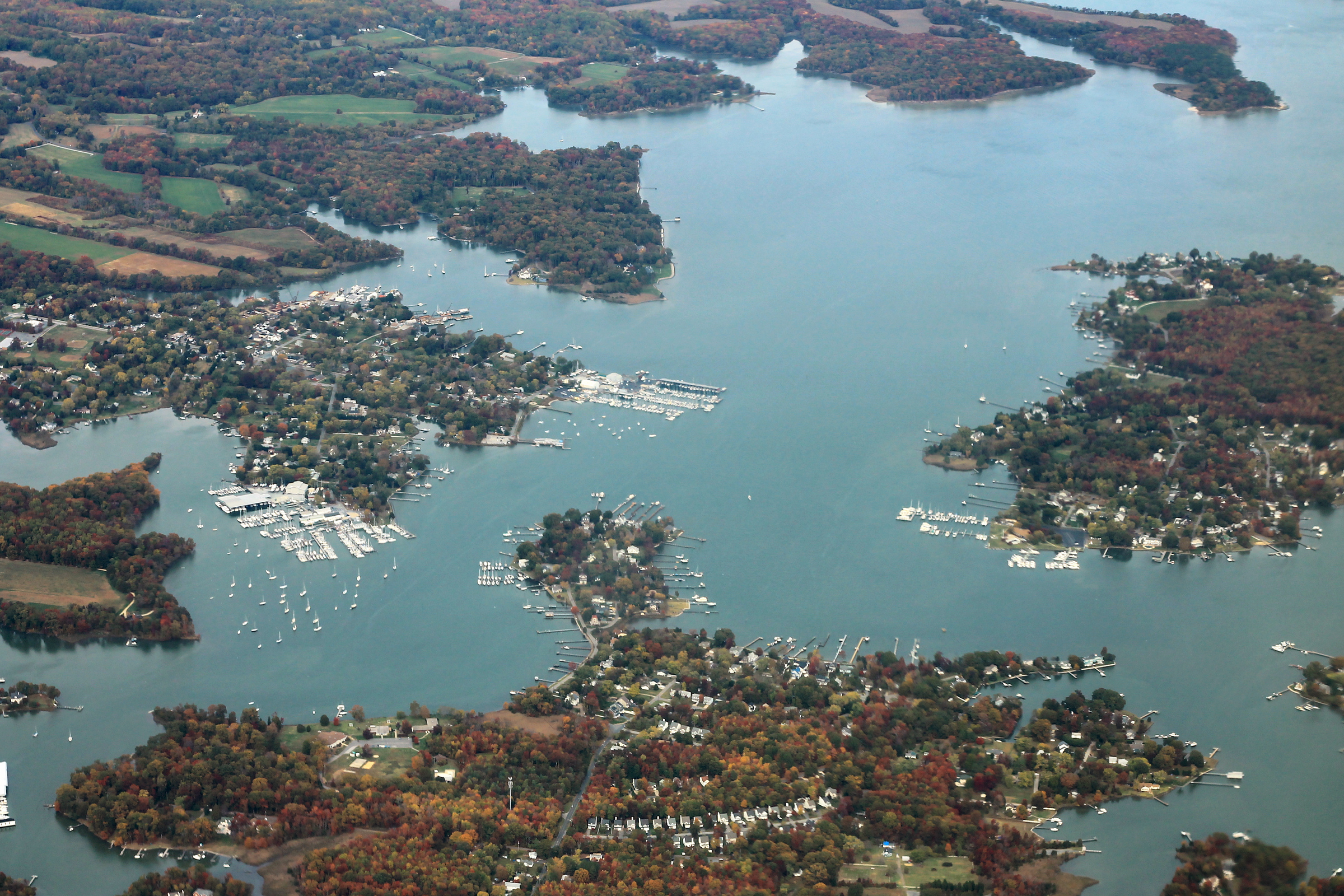
- Aerial image of Galesville, Maryland

- Location within the state of Maryland Galesville, Maryland (the United States)
- Coordinates: 38°50′35″N 76°32′37″W
- Country: United States
- State: Maryland
- County: Anne Arundel

Area
  - Total: 1.69 sq mi (4.37 km^{2})
  - Land: 1.32 sq mi (3.41 km^{2})
  - Water: 0.37 sq mi (0.96 km^{2})
- Elevation: 15 ft (4.6 m)

Population (2020)
  - Total: 623
  - Density: 472.9/sq mi (182.58/km^{2})
- Time zone: UTC−5 (Eastern (EST))
  - Summer (DST): UTC−4 (EDT)
- ZIP codes: 20765
- FIPS code: 24-31275
- GNIS feature ID: 590272

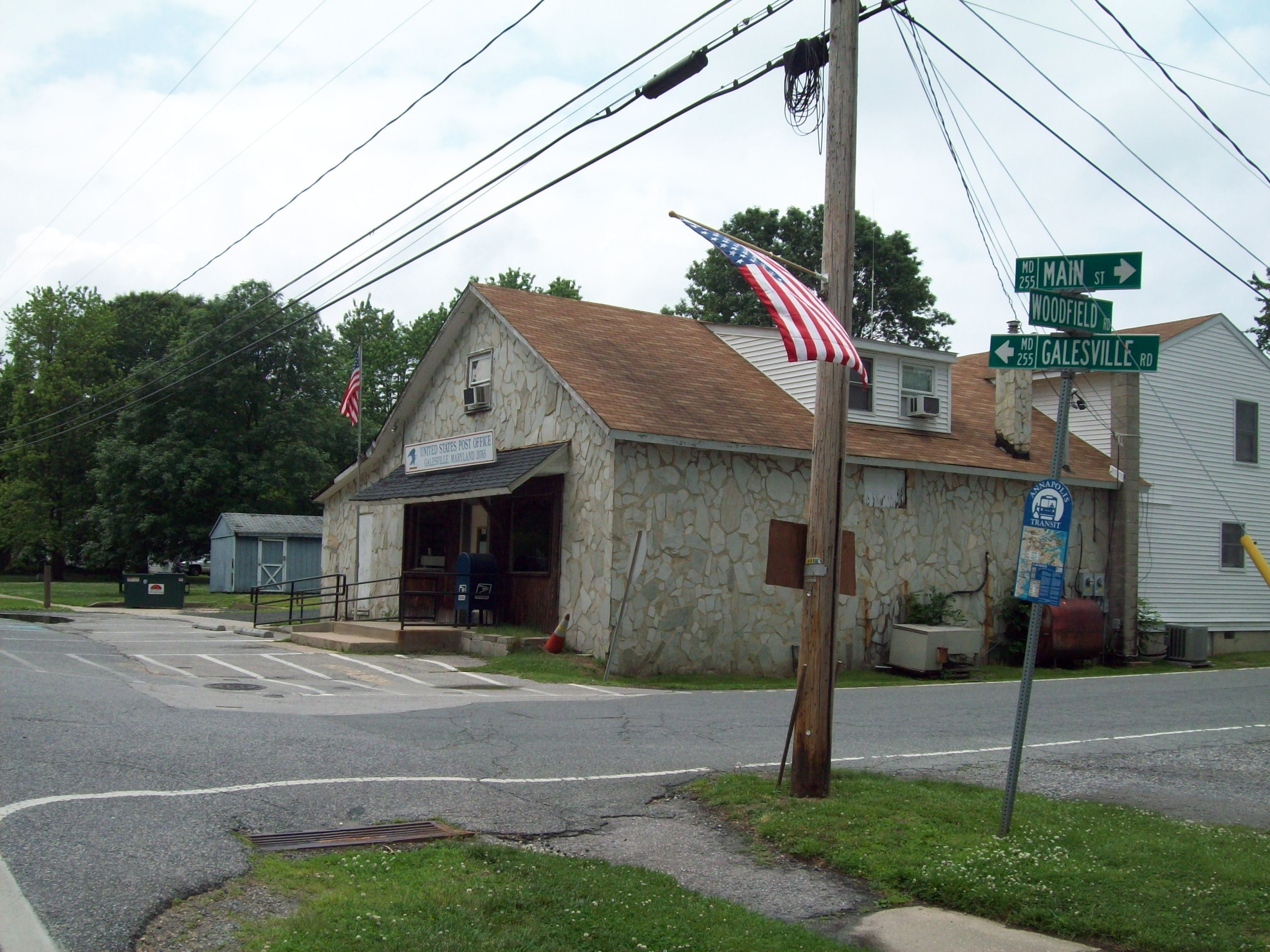
The U.S. Post Office at Galesville, Maryland, in May 2010

Galesville is an unincorporated town and census-designated place (CDP) in Anne Arundel County, Maryland, United States. As of the 2010 census, it had a population of 685.

Galesville is located at 38°50'35" north, 76°32'37" west (38.8431707 -76.5435702), along the western shore of the West River, an arm of the Chesapeake Bay. By road it is approximately 14 miles (23 km) south of Annapolis, the state capital.

== Demographics ==
Historical population
Census	Pop.	Note	%±
2010	685		—
2020	623		−9.1%
U.S. Decennial Census

== History ==
The area was an early center of Quaker settlement in America and, through the West River Friends meeting, it is considered the birthplace of organized Quakerism in Maryland. The town was once the terminus of a steamship line connecting to Annapolis and Baltimore. Once a thriving community of Chesapeake Bay watermen and their families, the town has developed an industry around pleasure boating.

== See also ==
- Tulip Hill, plantation house near Galesville
- Galesville Rosenwald School, former Black school
