= Richland (Harwood, Maryland) =

Historic house in Maryland, United States

- U.S. National Register of Historic Places
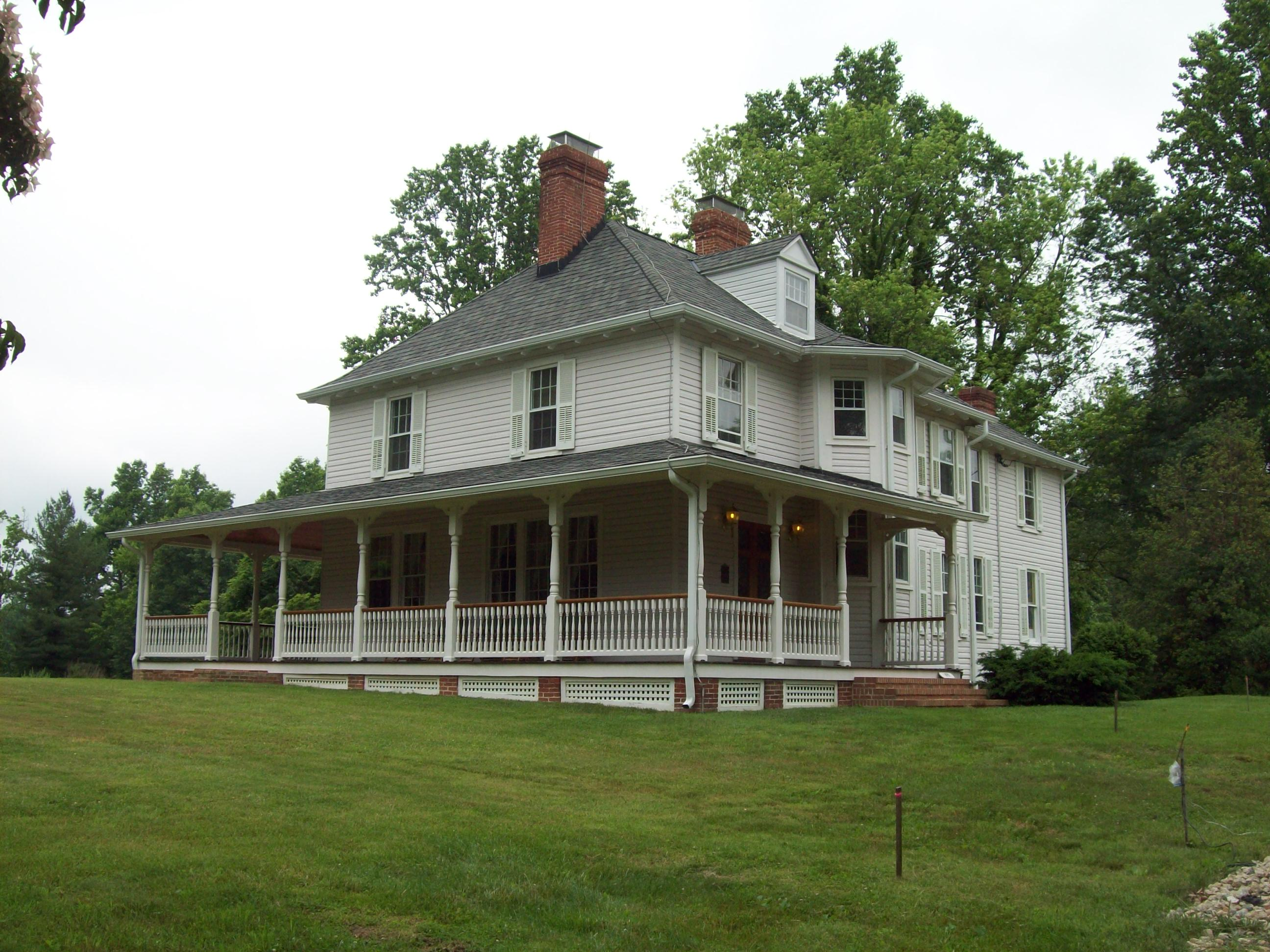
- Richland, Harwood MD, May 2010

- Location within Maryland Location within the United States
- Location: 195 Harwood Rd., Harwood, Maryland
- Coordinates: 38°52′15.77″N 76°37′33.79″W
- Built: 1893
- Architect: Noland, William Churchill; Noland and de Saussure
- Architectural style: Colonial Revival, Queen Anne
- NRHP reference No.: 07001310
- Added to NRHP: December 26, 2007

Richland is a historic home at Harwood, Anne Arundel County, Maryland. It is a 2 1/2-story, frame, hip-roofed dwelling of approximately 3,000 square feet (280 m^{2}). It was constructed for gentleman farmer Robert Murray Cheston (1849–1904) and his wife, the former Mary Murray (1859–1943). It is the only known late-19th-century rural Anne Arundel County dwelling definitively associated with a specific architectural firm. The plans were prepared by the Roanoke, Virginia based architectural firm of Noland and de Saussure, founded by William C. Noland. The home reflects both the Colonial Revival and Queen Anne styles. The house on the 332 acre Richland farm was built in 1893. In the 1950s, the Cheston family subdivided the property and sold the house with approximately 58 acres to the Talliaferro family, and sold the remaining acreage to the Catterton family. The Talliaferro family named their new parcel "Thanksgiving Farm". In 1996, the Heimbuch family purchased Thanksgiving Farm from the Talliaferro family, began planting vineyards1998, completed a restoration of the house in 2004, and opened a winery on the property in 2006.

It was listed on the National Register of Historic Places in 2007.
