= Hammond–Harwood House =

Historic house in Annapolis, Maryland, United States

- Hammond-Harwood House
- U.S. National Register of Historic Places
- U.S. National Historic Landmark
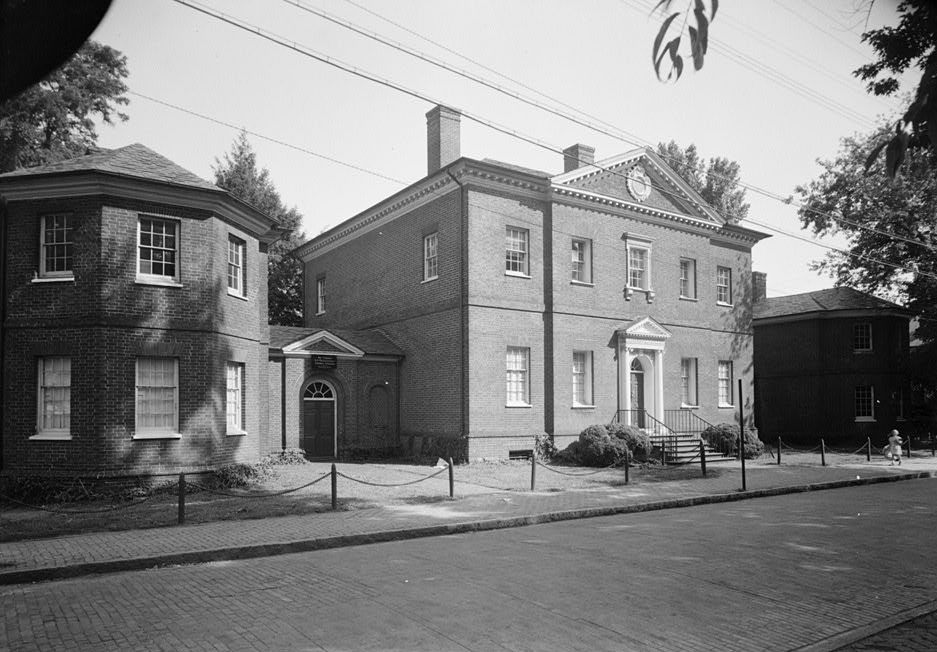
- Exterior view of the Hammond–Harwood House

- Location within Maryland Location within the United States
- Location: Maryland Ave. and King George St., Annapolis, Maryland
- Coordinates: 38°58′51.4″N 76°29′18.2″W
- Area: 0.5 acres (0.20 ha)
- Built: 1774
- Architect: Buckland, William
- Architectural style: Georgian
- NRHP reference No.: 66000384

Significant dates
- Added to NRHP: October 15, 1966
- Designated NHL: October 9, 1960

The Hammond–Harwood House is a historic house museum at 19 Maryland Avenue in Annapolis, Maryland, USA. Built in 1774, is one of the premier colonial houses remaining in America from the British colonial period (1607–1776). It is one of the only existing works of colonial academic architecture that was principally designed from a plate in Andrea Palladio's I Quattro Libri dell'Architettura (The Four Books of Architecture) (1570). The house was designed by the architect William Buckland in 1773–1774 for wealthy farmer Matthias Hammond of Anne Arundel County, Maryland. It was modeled on the design of the Villa Pisani in Montagnana, Italy, as depicted in Book II, Chapter XIV of Palladio's work. It was designated a National Historic Landmark in 1960, and is now managed by a non-profit organization as a museum.

== History ==
Construction on the house began about April 1774, and most of the house was probably completed before the death of the architect in November or December of the same year. Owner Matthias Hammond probably never occupied his elegant house because he abruptly left Annapolis for his family's country estate in 1776. He died in 1786 after renting out the house for many years.

The house passed to his nephews John, and then to Philip Hammond, who eventually sold the house to Ninian Pinkney in 1810. Pinkney, however, quickly sold the house to Judge Jeremiah Chase in 1811. Judge Chase bought the house as a home for the family of his daughter, Frances Townley Chase Loockerman. Chase was well acquainted with the house because he had rented the northeast wing, beginning in the late 1770s.

Judge Chase's descendants lived in the house until the death of his great-granddaughter Hester Ann Harwood in 1924. Her mother, Judge Chase's granddaughter, married William Harwood, the great-grandson of William Buckland, the architect of the house.

Hester Ann Harwood died intestate, and the house was sold in 1926 to St. John's College. The College used the house as a teaching tool for one of America's first courses taught on the decorative arts until financial necessity forced the college to sell to the Hammond–Harwood House Association in 1940. This non-profit corporation continues to own the house and operates it as a public museum.

== Architecture ==
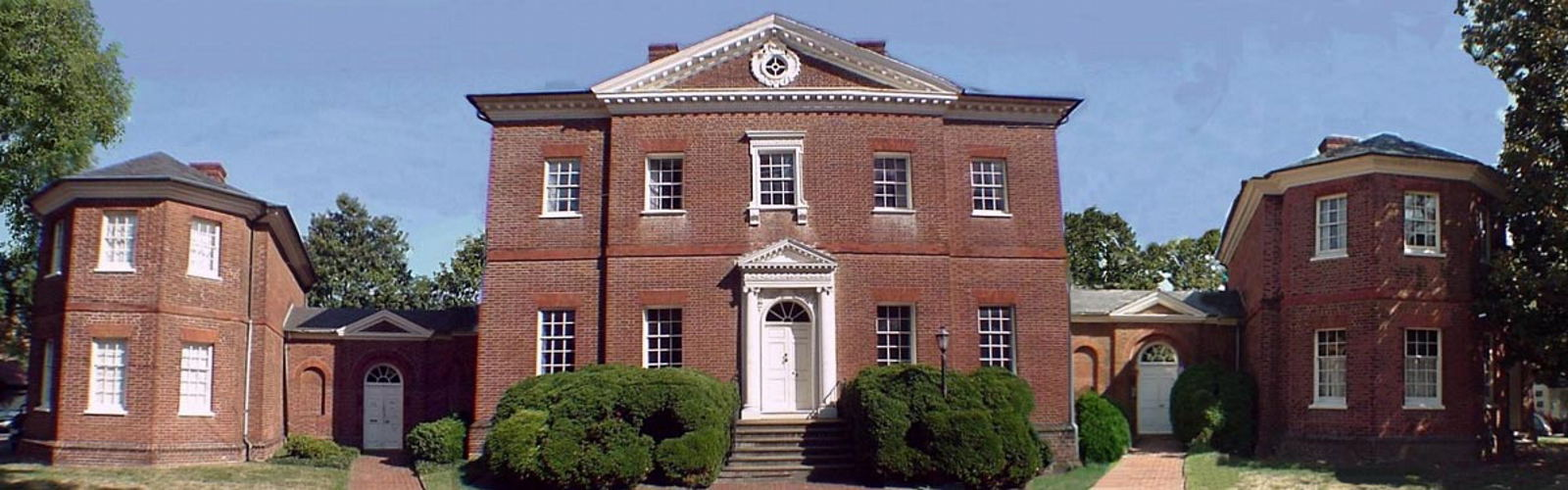
Hammond–Harwood House Main Facade

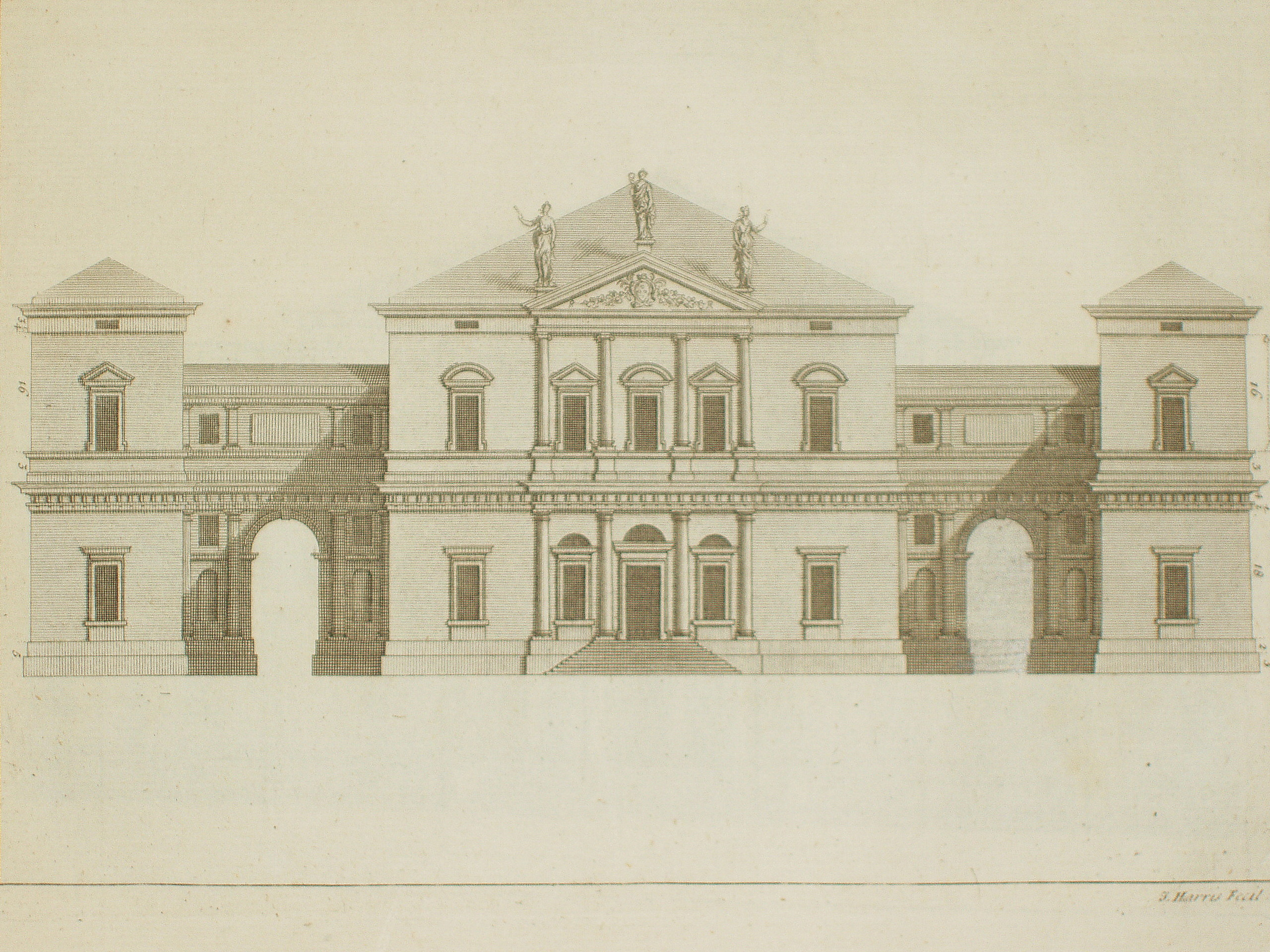
The Villa Pisani, Montagnana from The Four Books of Architecture by Andrea Palladio, Giacomo Leoni, 1742

The house ranks architecturally with many of the great mansions built in the late Colonial period; however, it is among only a few houses in British North America directly inspired from a plate in Palladio's, I Quattro Libri dell'Architettura.

Architect William Buckland adapted Palladio's Villa Pisani design to satisfy the tastes of colonial Annapolis. He re-designed the plan to accommodate the tastes for asymmetrical regional preferences and modified the hyphens from Palladio's arched entries to more practical single storey connecting links. He also incorporated fashionable urban design by sinking the windows in the method mandated by the London Building Act 1774 (14 Geo. 3. c. 78). This device provided better protection from fire and gave the overall design a greater degree of visual solidity and three dimensionality (see image at right). This adaptation from Palladio's model marks his maturity as an architect and ranks him as one of America's first and finest architects.

The initial design of Thomas Jefferson's Monticello was taken from the Villa Cornaro in Piombino Dese, Italy, in Book II, Chapter XV of I Quattro Libri dell'Architettura, but this façade was later covered up by Jefferson's own expansions to his house. Thomas Jefferson made two drawings of the Hammond–Harwood House when he served the government in Annapolis in 1783–1784. One could assume that Jefferson recognized the house as derived from Palladio because his knowledge of The Four Books of Architecture was extensive. He referred to the book as his architectural "bible" and the plate of the Villa Cornaro follows the Villa Pisani plate; and directly opposite the Villa Cornaro in some 18th-century English transcriptions of the work.

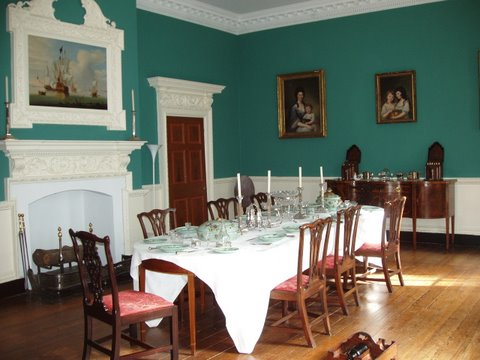
Dining room with rococo carving attributed to Thomas Hall

=== Description ===
The Hammond–Harwood House is a five-part brick house with a five-bay two-story central block, two-story end wings and one-story connecting hyphens on either side. The central block has a shallow hipped roof. The wings project toward the street with three-sided hipped-roof bays. The hyphens are rendered as a blind arcade, with the central bay a door opening with a pediment above. There is little decoration, with plain rubbed brick flat arches over the windows. Ornament is confined to the central bay, whose door is framed by engaged Ionic columns and topped by a fanlight. Above the door the second floor window is framed with a surround and entablature.

The interior presents the appearance of symmetry where it is in fact not symmetrical, using false doors where necessary to maintain the illusion. The main rooms are the first-floor dining room and the second-floor ballroom immediately above, at the rear of the house overlooking the garden. The dining room features an opening, centered in the facade, that is treated as a door on the outside and as a window on the inside.

The Hammond–Harwood House was featured in Bob Vila's A&E Network production, Guide to Historic Homes of America, in the two-hour segment on the Mid-Atlantic States.

== See also ==
- Brice House
- Chase–Lloyd House, another National Historic Landmark, located across the street
- Paca House and Garden
- Whitehall (Annapolis, Maryland)
- Tulip Hill
- List of National Historic Landmarks in Maryland
- National Register of Historic Places listings in Anne Arundel County, Maryland
