= Turkey Hill (Linthicum Heights, Maryland) =

Historic house in Maryland, United States

- U.S. National Register of Historic Places
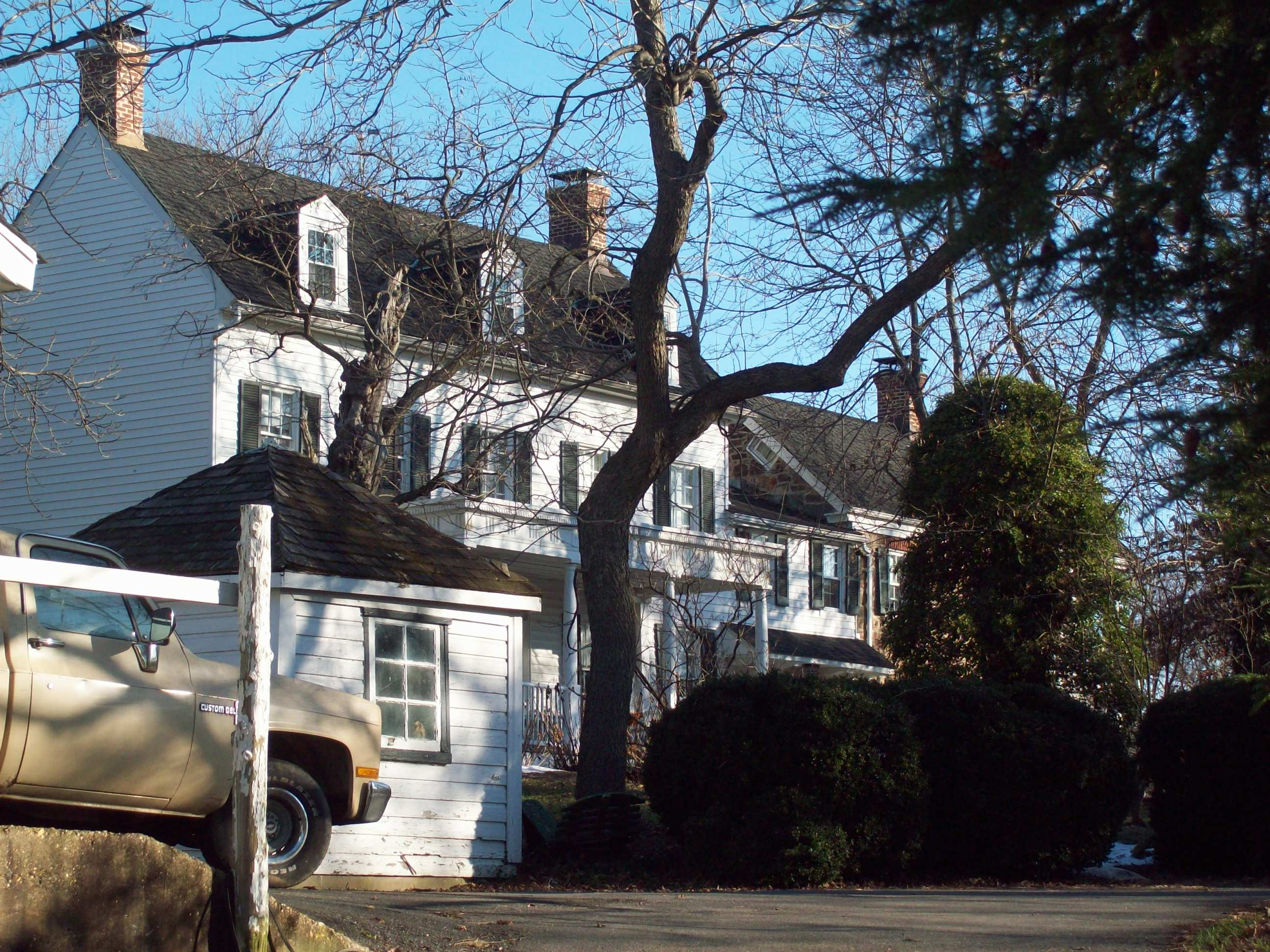
- Turkey Hill, December 2009

- Location within Maryland Location within the United States
- Location: 106 W. Maple Rd., Linthicum Heights, Maryland
- Coordinates: 39°12′21″N 76°39′17″W
- Area: 2.5 acres (1.0 ha)
- Built: 1825
- Architectural style: Mixed (more Than 2 Styles From Different Periods)
- NRHP reference No.: 79001109
- Added to NRHP: July 24, 1979

Turkey Hill is a historic home at Linthicum Heights, Maryland, United States. It was built about 1822 by William Linthicum. Originally the house consisted of a 1 1/2-story frame section and a three-story field stone section linked together by an open porch. As the family increased in size, Linthicum added another story to the frame portion, making it two and a half stories high. Also on the property is a birdhouse, modeled after Camden Station in Baltimore City; a late-19th-century carriage house; a late-19th-century meathouse; and an early-20th-century garage also stand on the property.

Turkey Hill was listed on the National Register of Historic Places in 1979.
