= Maryland Route 980 =

State highway in Maryland, United States

Maryland Route 980

Route information
- Maintained by MDSHA
- Existed: 1972–present

MD 980A
- Length: 1.07 mi (1.72 km)
- South end: MD 980E near Waysons Corner
- North end: MD 4 / MD 408 at Waysons Corner

MD 980B
- Length: 2.05 mi (3.30 km)
- South end: Dead end at Lyons Creek
- Major intersections: MD 4 near Bristol
- North end: Wrighton Road in Bristol

Location
- Country: United States
- State: Maryland
- Counties: Anne Arundel, Prince George's

Highway system
- Maryland highway system; Interstate; US; State; Scenic Byways
| ← MD 979 | → MD 981 |

Maryland Route 980 (MD 980) is a designation used for a collection of five service roads in the U.S. state of Maryland along MD 4, four in Bristol and Waysons Corner in southern Anne Arundel County and one near Upper Marlboro in southern Prince George's County. MD 980 was assigned to the service roads constructed during the expansion of MD 4 to a four-lane divided highway in the early to mid-1960s.

== Route description ==
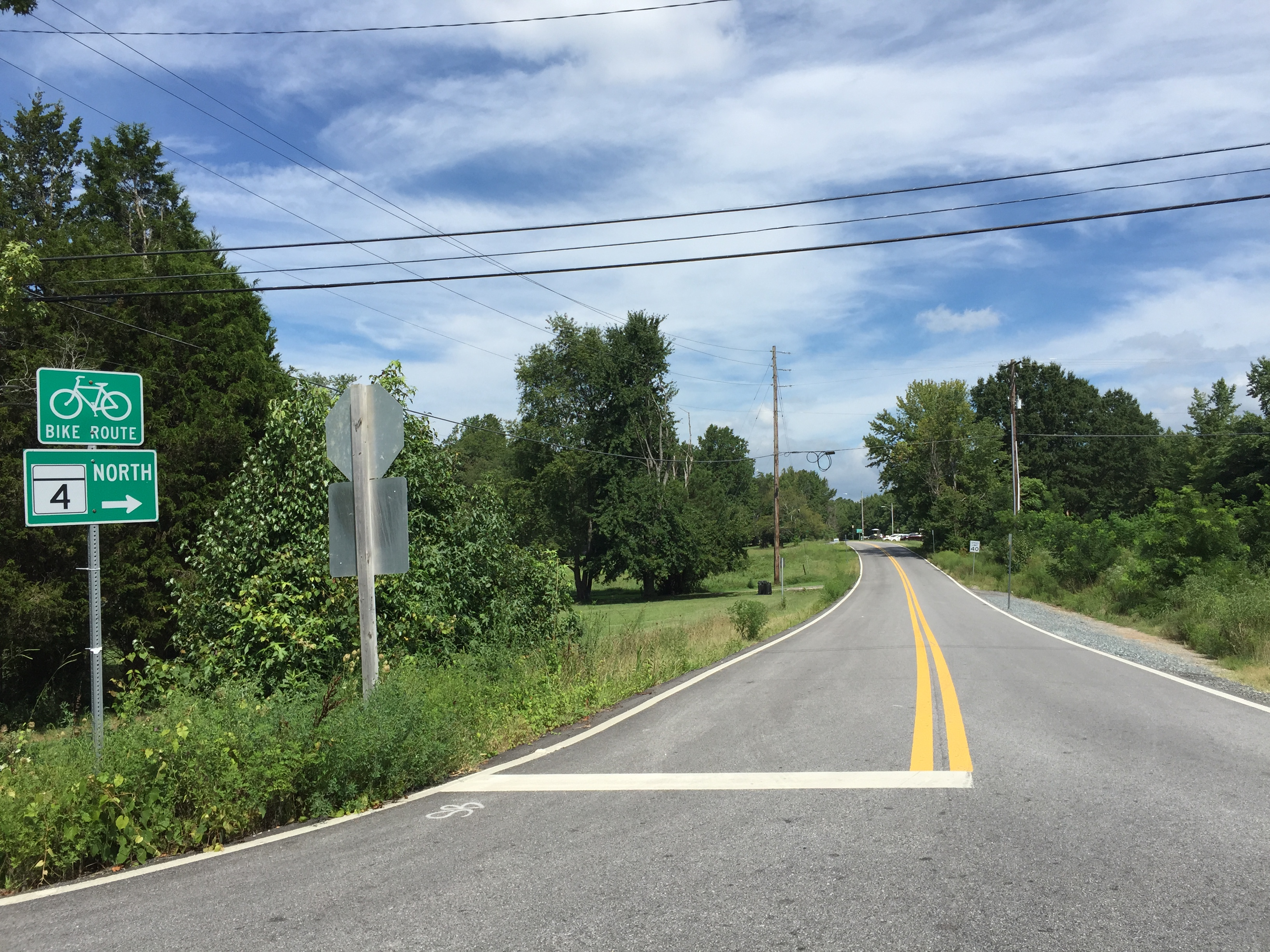
View north along MD 980B in Lyons Creek

The two longest segments of MD 980 are MD 980A and MD 980B, which have lengths of 1.07 miles (1.72 km) and 2.05 miles (3.30 km), respectively. MD 980A begins at an intersection with MD 980E (Plummer Lane) near Waysons Corner. The road heads northwest as MD 4 Service Road, a two-lane undivided road parallel and adjacent to the southbound direction of MD 4. Midway through its run, the highway receives an exit ramp from southbound MD 4. MD 980A curves west and veers north to its terminus at a three-quarter diamond interchange with MD 4 (Stephanie Roper Highway) and MD 408 (Mount Zion–Marlboro Road), which curves east toward Waysons Corner.

MD 980B begins at a dead end at a gate just north of Lyons Creek. The road heads north as two-lane undivided Southern Most Road, which passes close to the ramp from southbound MD 4 to eastbound MD 260 (Chesapeake Beach Road) and begins to parallel the southbound direction of MD 4 (Southern Maryland Boulevard). MD 980B's name changes to MD 4 Service Road at Lower Pindell Road, where an exit ramp from southbound MD 4 meets the service road. Past this intersection, the road passes a park and ride lot serving MTA Maryland commuter buses that is situated between MD 980B and MD 4, with access from MD 980B. There is an entrance ramp to southbound MD 4 south of Upper Pindell Road. The highway closely parallels MD 4 until the latter highway's diamond interchange with MD 258 (Bay Front Road) in Bristol. MD 980B curves around the interchange and reaches its northern terminus at an intersection with Wrighton Road just west of Wrighton Road's intersection with the western end of MD 258 and an exit ramp from southbound MD 4.

There are three other segments of MD 980:

- MD 980C is the designation for the 0.52-mile (0.84 km) portion of Fishers Station Road running from the beginning of state maintenance near Lyons Creek north to its on-ramp to northbound MD 4, which the route closely parallels, near Bristol.
- MD 980D is the designation for the 0.27-mile (0.43 km) segment of Ritchie Marlboro Road from the road's interchange with MD 4 (Pennsylvania Avenue) to the intersection of Ritchie Marlboro Road and Old Marlboro Pike west of Upper Marlboro in Prince George's County.
- MD 980E is the designation for the very short (0.13-mile (0.21 km)) portion of Plummer Lane south from its right-in/right-out interchange with southbound MD 4 to the end of state maintenance just south of the southern end of MD 980A near Bristol.

== History ==
Southern Maryland Boulevard was constructed as a 18-foot-wide (5.5 m) concrete road from MD 4 at Waysons Corner—MD 4 then included what is now MD 408 east of Waysons Corner—to MD 2 at Sunderland in Calvert County between 1928 and 1930. The highway was designated MD 416 by 1933. The original highway followed the entire length of what is now MD 794 from Waysons Corner to Bristol. MD 416 continued south along what are now the northbound lanes of MD 4, then veered southwest and joined the course of MD 980B south of Lower Pindell Road. The highway crossed over Lyons Creek and under the Chesapeake Beach Railway at a location called Fishers Station. MD 416 was placed on MD 4's modern alignment at Lyons Creek between 1953 and 1956. The bypass left behind what is now part of MD 980B. MD 4 and MD 416 were expanded to a divided highway from the Patuxent River to south of Lyons Creek between 1959 and 1962. The northern part of MD 980B and MD 980A and MD 980C were built as the main highway's service roads by 1972. MD 980A began at a ramp from southbound MD 4. That highway was reconstructed in 1993 when MD 4 was reconstructed in Anne Arundel County and the MD 4–MD 408 interchange was built. MD 980D was constructed as the westernmost part of MD 4's freeway bypass of Upper Marlboro, which was built between 1959 and 1962. MD 980D was left behind when the MD 4 freeway was extended west beyond MD 223 in 1964.

== Junction list ==
=== MD 980A ===
The entire route is in Waysons Corner, Anne Arundel County.

| mi | km | Destinations | Notes |
|---|---|---|---|
| 0.00 | 0.00 | MD 980E (Plummer Lane) to MD 4 south – Prince Frederick | Southern terminus |
| 1.07 | 1.72 | MD 4 (Stephanie Roper Highway) / MD 408 east (Mount Zion–Marlboro Road) – Upper Marlboro, Lothian | Diamond interchange; northern terminus |
1.000 mi = 1.609 km; 1.000 km = 0.621 mi

=== MD 980B ===
The entire route is in Anne Arundel County.

| Location | mi | km | Destinations | Notes |
|---|---|---|---|---|
| Lyons Creek | 0.00 | 0.00 | Dead end | Southern terminus |
| Bristol | 1.24 | 2.00 | MD 4 south (Southern Maryland Boulevard) – Prince Frederick | Entrance ramp only |
| Bristol | 2.05 | 3.30 | Wrighton Road to MD 4 / MD 258 – Upper Marlboro, Deale | Northern terminus |
1.000 mi = 1.609 km; 1.000 km = 0.621 mi
