= Maryland Route 256 =

Highway in Maryland, USA

Maryland Route 256
- Maryland Route 256 highlighted in red

Route information
- Maintained by MDSHA
- Length: 5.28 mi (8.50 km)
- Existed: 1927–present
- Tourist routes: Roots and Tides Scenic Byway

Major junctions
- West end: MD 2 at Tracys Landing
- MD 258 in Deale
- East end: MD 468 in Shady Side

Location
- Country: United States
- State: Maryland
- Counties: Anne Arundel

Highway system
- Maryland highway system; Interstate; US; State; Scenic Byways
← MD 255	→ MD 257

Maryland Route 256 (MD 256) is a state highway in the U.S. state of Maryland. The highway runs 5.28 miles (8.50 km) from MD 2 at Tracys Landing east to MD 468 in Shady Side. MD 256 connects the aforementioned communities with Deale on the shore of Herring Bay in southern Anne Arundel County. The highway was constructed at either end in the mid-1920s and completed through Deale in the early 1930s.

== Route description ==
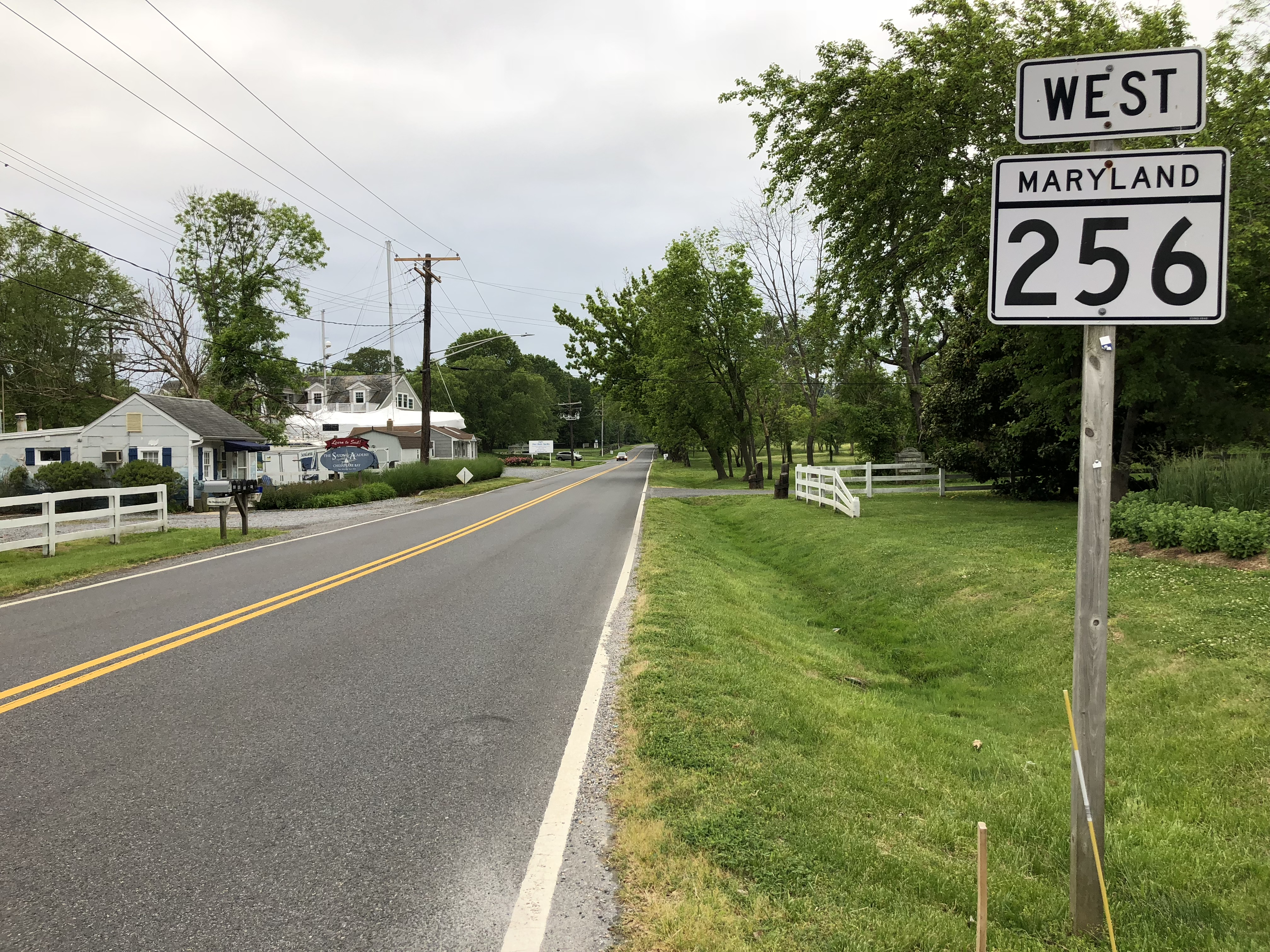
View west along MD 256 in Deale

MD 256 begins at an intersection with MD 2 (Solomons Island Road) at Tracys Landing. The state highway heads east as two-lane undivided Deale Road, passing south of Traceys Elementary School and Deale-Traceys Park. MD 256 enters the community of Deale, which features several marinas. The highway crosses Tracys Creek and curves north, then makes a right-angle turn east at Rockhold Creek Road and crosses Rockhold Creek. In the center of Deale, at Masons Beach Road, MD 256 turns north onto Deale Churchton Road. The highway meets the eastern end of MD 258 (Bay Front Road) at a roundabout. MD 256 continues through the hamlet of Churchton, where Franklin Manor Road splits east toward Franklin Manor-on-the-Bay. The state highway reaches its eastern terminus at MD 468 in Shady Side. That highway heads west as Muddy Creek Road toward Galesville and east as Shady Side Road into the center of the namesake community.

== History ==
Maryland Route 257
- Location: Deale
- Existed: 1927–c. 1939

The first segment of MD 256 was constructed as a 15-foot (4.6 m) wide gravel road from MD 2 east to the hamlet of Nutwell west of Deale, near the intersection with Franklin Gibson Road, in 1923. This segment was originally designated as MD 257. A second segment of MD 256 was constructed as a gravel road of the same width from MD 255 (now MD 468) in Shady Side south through Churchton to Swamp Circle Road north of the center of Deale in 1926. The gap through Deale was filled in 1932 and 1933. By 1934, traffic was dense enough on the Deale–Shady Side road that the Maryland State Roads Commission recommended the highway be expanded from 15 to 20 feet (4.6 to 6.1 m) in width. MD 256 replaced all of MD 257 in 1939. The roundabout at MD 256's junction with MD 258 was installed in 2007.

== Junction list ==
The entire route is in Anne Arundel County.

Location	mi	km	Destinations	Notes
Tracys Landing	0.00	0.00	MD 2 (Solomons Island Road) – Annapolis, Prince Frederick	Western terminus
Deale	3.51	5.65	MD 258 west (Bay Front Road) – Bristol	Roundabout; eastern terminus of MD 258
Shady Side	5.28	8.50	MD 468 (Muddy Creek Road/Shady Side Road) – Galesville	Eastern terminus
1.000 mi = 1.609 km; 1.000 km = 0.621 mi
