= Maryland Route 4 =

State highway in Maryland, US

Maryland Route 4
- Maryland Route 4 highlighted in red

Route information
- Maintained by MDSHA
- Length: 64.85 mi (104.37 km)
- Existed: 1927–present
- Tourist routes: Star-Spangled Banner Scenic Byway

Major junctions
- South end: MD 5 in Leonardtown
- MD 235 in California; MD 2 in Solomons; MD 231 in Prince Frederick; MD 2 in Sunderland; MD 260 at Lyons Creek; US 301 in Upper Marlboro; MD 223 in Melwood; MD 337 in Forestville; I-95 / I-495 in Forestville; MD 458 near Suitland
- North end: Pennsylvania Avenue at the District of Columbia boundary near Suitland

Location
- Country: United States
- State: Maryland
- Counties: St. Mary's, Calvert, Anne Arundel, Prince George's

Highway system
- Maryland highway system; Interstate; US; State; Scenic Byways
← MD 3	→ MD 5

Maryland Route 4 (MD 4) is a state highway in the U.S. state of Maryland. The highway runs 64.85 miles (104.37 km) from MD 5 in Leonardtown north to Southern Avenue in Suitland at the District of Columbia boundary, beyond which the highway continues into Washington as Pennsylvania Avenue. MD 4 is a four- to six-lane highway that connects Washington and communities around Interstate 95 (I-95)/I-495 (Capital Beltway) with southern Prince George's County with southwestern Anne Arundel County. The highway is the primary highway for the length of Calvert County, during most of which the route runs concurrently with MD 2. MD 4 also connects Calvert and St. Mary's counties via the Governor Thomas Johnson Bridge across the Patuxent River. The highway connects the Southern Maryland county seats of Leonardtown, Prince Frederick, and Upper Marlboro.

MD 4 is one of the original Maryland state highways. The state highway followed roughly its present alignment through Prince George's County, then headed east through Anne Arundel County along what is now MD 408. In the 1960s, MD 4 took over MD 416 (Southern Maryland Boulevard) southeast to Sunderland and joined MD 2 all the way to Solomons. After the Governor Thomas Johnson Bridge opened in the late 1970s, MD 4 was extended west from Solomons to Leonardtown. MD 4 has been upgraded to a divided highway for most of its length, beginning in the early 1960s from Washington, reaching Solomons in the mid-1980s, and expected to continue into St. Mary's County in the future.

== Route description ==
MD 4 has several names over its course. The highway is named St. Andrew's Church Road and Patuxent Beach Road west and east of MD 235, respectively, in St. Mary's County. The highway follows Solomons Island Road throughout its concurrency with MD 2, which at 27.40 miles (44.10 km) is the longest state-numbered-highway concurrency in Maryland. MD 4 is known as Southern Maryland Boulevard from MD 2 in Sunderland to MD 258 in Bristol. From Bristol to MD 717 in Upper Marlboro, the route is named Stephanie Roper Highway. MD 4 is named Pennsylvania Avenue from MD 717 to the same-named avenue at the District of Columbia boundary. Stephanie Roper Highway commemorates the victim of a 1982 murder. The subsequent legal process spurred the victims' rights movement and led to the 2004 federal Crime Victims' Rights Act. The Roper name was added to the highway by an October 23, 2012, proclamation by then-Governor Martin O'Malley. MD 4 is part of the National Highway System between MD 235 in California and its northern terminus.

=== Leonardtown to Sunderland ===
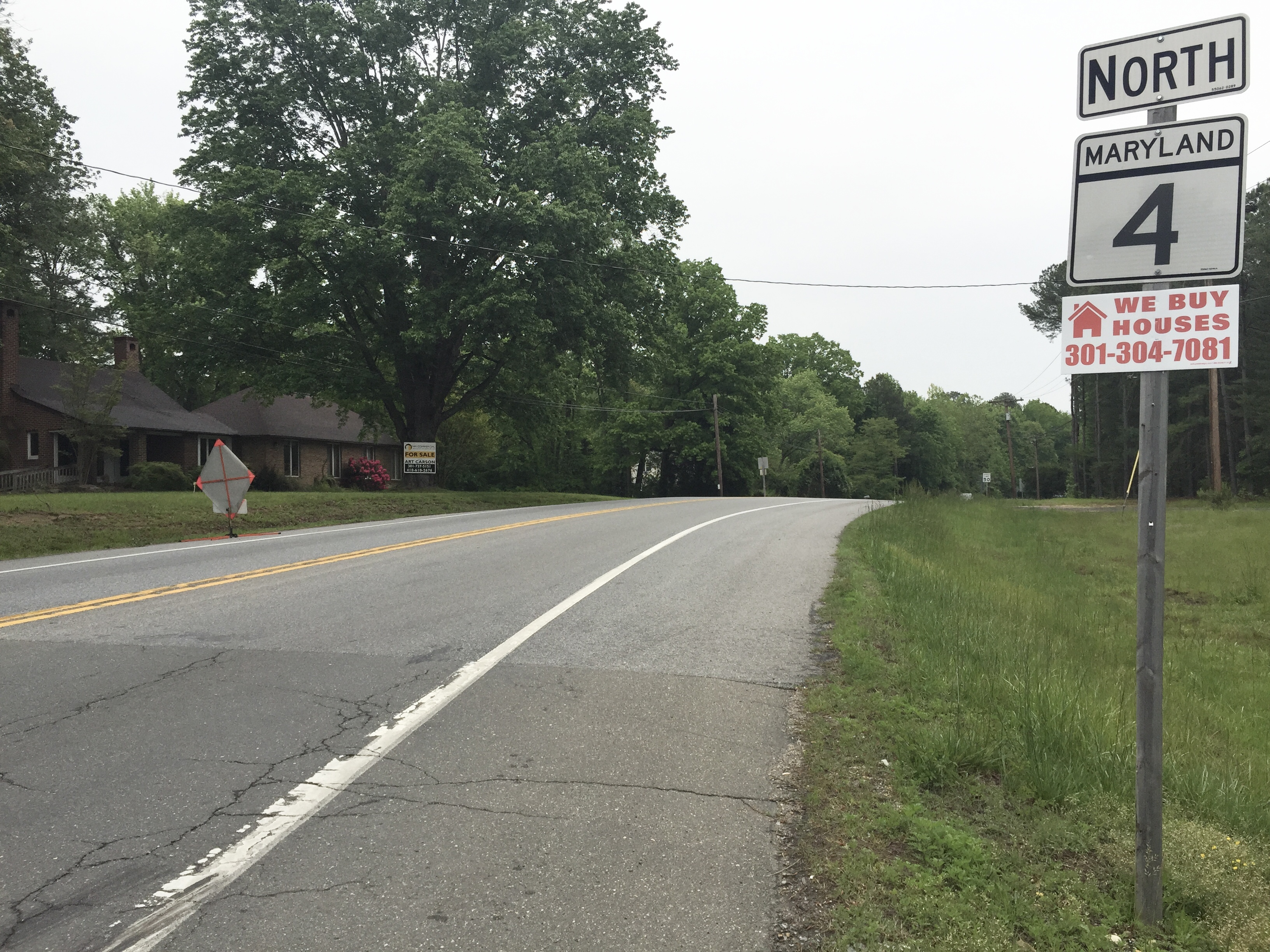
View north from the south end of MD 4 at MD 5 near Leonardtown

MD 4 begins at an intersection with MD 5 (Point Lookout Road) just east of the town of Leonardtown. The highway heads east as two-lane St. Andrews Church Road. MD 4 crosses several branches of Glebe Run, including Gravelly Run, and then parallels and crosses Glebe Run. The highway crosses the Western Branch of the St. Mary's River west of Indian Bridge Road, which leads south toward St. Mary's River State Park and later becomes MD 471. MD 4 heads northeast by historic St. Andrew's Church and crosses the Eastern Branch of the St. Mary's River on its way to California, where the highway intersects MD 235 (Three Notch Road). The highway continues as Patuxent Beach Road, a two-lane controlled-access highway. The highway curves to the east and back northeast again, crossing Mill Creek and Kingston Creek before crossing Town Creek and the Patuxent River on the high-level Governor Thomas Johnson Bridge.

Highway marker used along the MD 2/MD 4 concurrency

MD 4 descends from the bridge into Calvert County just north of Solomons. The highway's name becomes Solomons Island Road and it expands to a four-lane divided highway. MD 4 has a compact interchange with MD 2, which leads south toward the Calvert Marine Museum and joins MD 4 in a long concurrency, during which the highway is often denoted MD 2–4. MD 2-4 heads north between the Solomons Naval Recreation Center to the west and MD 765 (Solomons Island Road South) on the east. MD 765 closely parallels the highway through the community of Dowell and intersections with Patuxent Point Parkway and Dowell Road. North of the latter road, MD 765 (H.G. Trueman Road) veers away from MD 2–4, which is also marked as Louis L. Goldstein Highway. MD 2-4 continues northeast through Lusby, where the highway has directional crossover intersections with Southern Connector Boulevard (unsigned MD 765Z) and MD 760 (Rousby Hall Road).

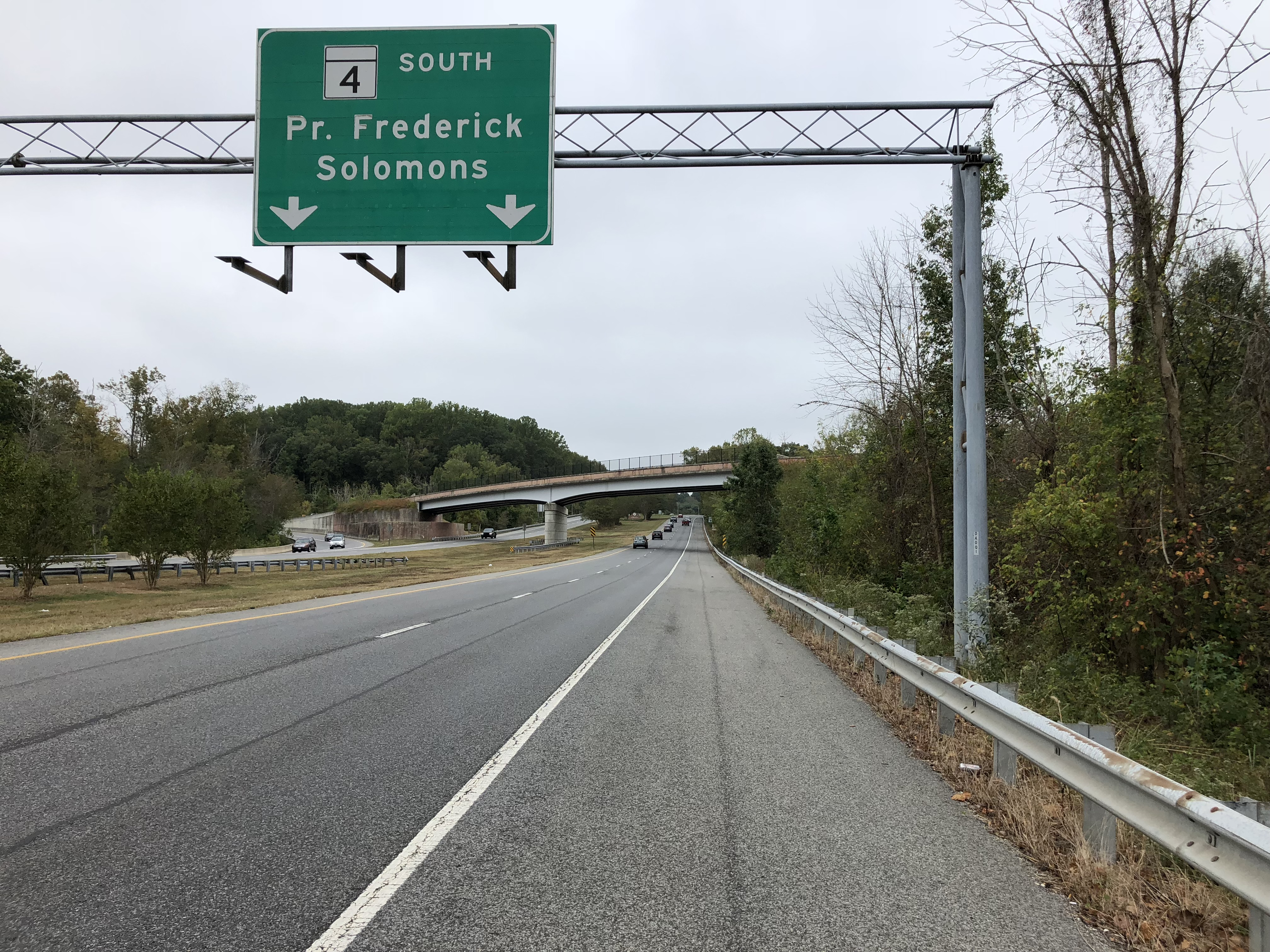
Southbound MD 4 entering Calvert County

MD 2-4 gradually curves north and meets the western end of MD 497 (Cove Point Road) and a connecting road that leads to the parallel MD 765 and Calvert Cliffs State Park. The highway intersects MD 765 (Pardoe Road) and receives the end of the parallel highway shortly before crossing Johns Creek. MD 2-4 is paralleled to the east by another section of MD 765, Nursery Road, as it passes to the west of the Calvert Cliffs Nuclear Power Plant. Another section of MD 765, Saw Mill Road, parallels the divided highway between Calvert Cliffs Parkway, which leads to the power station, and Flag Pond Parkway, which leads to Flag Ponds Nature Park. After crossing Quaker Swamp, also known as Woodland Branch of St. Leonard Creek, MD 2-4 enters the community of St. Leonard and is paralleled to the east by another segment of MD 765, St. Leonard Road. At the intersection with Ball Road/Calvert Beach Road in St. Leonard, the road passes east of a park and ride lot serving MTA Maryland commuter buses. Calvert Beach Road heads east to serve Calvert Beach. The highway intersects Western Shores Boulevard, which provide access to Long Beach, respectively. In Port Republic, MD 2-4 curve west at MD 509 (Governor Run Road) and has a dual intersection with MD 765 and MD 264 (Broomes Island Road). The junction with MD 765 is a right-in/right-out intersection with northbound MD 2-4; the MD 264 intersection is a directional crossover.

MD 2-4 meets the eastern end of MD 506 (Sixes Road) and curves north toward the unincorporated town center of Prince Frederick. MD 765 (Main Street) splits to the northbound side of the main highway shortly before the highways cross Parker Creek, and MD 2-4 expands to six lanes ahead of its intersection with MD 231, which heads west as Hallowing Point Road and east as Church Street toward the Calvert County courthouse and offices. Further north, the highway receives the north end of MD 765. The routes leave Prince Frederick after their junction with MD 402 (Dares Beach Road) and the roadway reduces to four lanes before passing west of Calvert Health Medical Center. MD 2-4 cross Hunting Creek immediately after their directional crossover intersection with MD 263 (Plum Point Road). The highway parallels the loop of MD 524 (Old Town Road), which leads to MD 521, through Huntingtown. A park and ride lot is located southwest of the intersection with the southern terminus of MD 524. Within Huntingtown, the divided highway passes west of Huntingtown High School. From Huntingtown, the divided highway continues straight north to the split of MD 2 and MD 4 at a directional crossover intersection in Sunderland.

=== Sunderland to Suitland ===
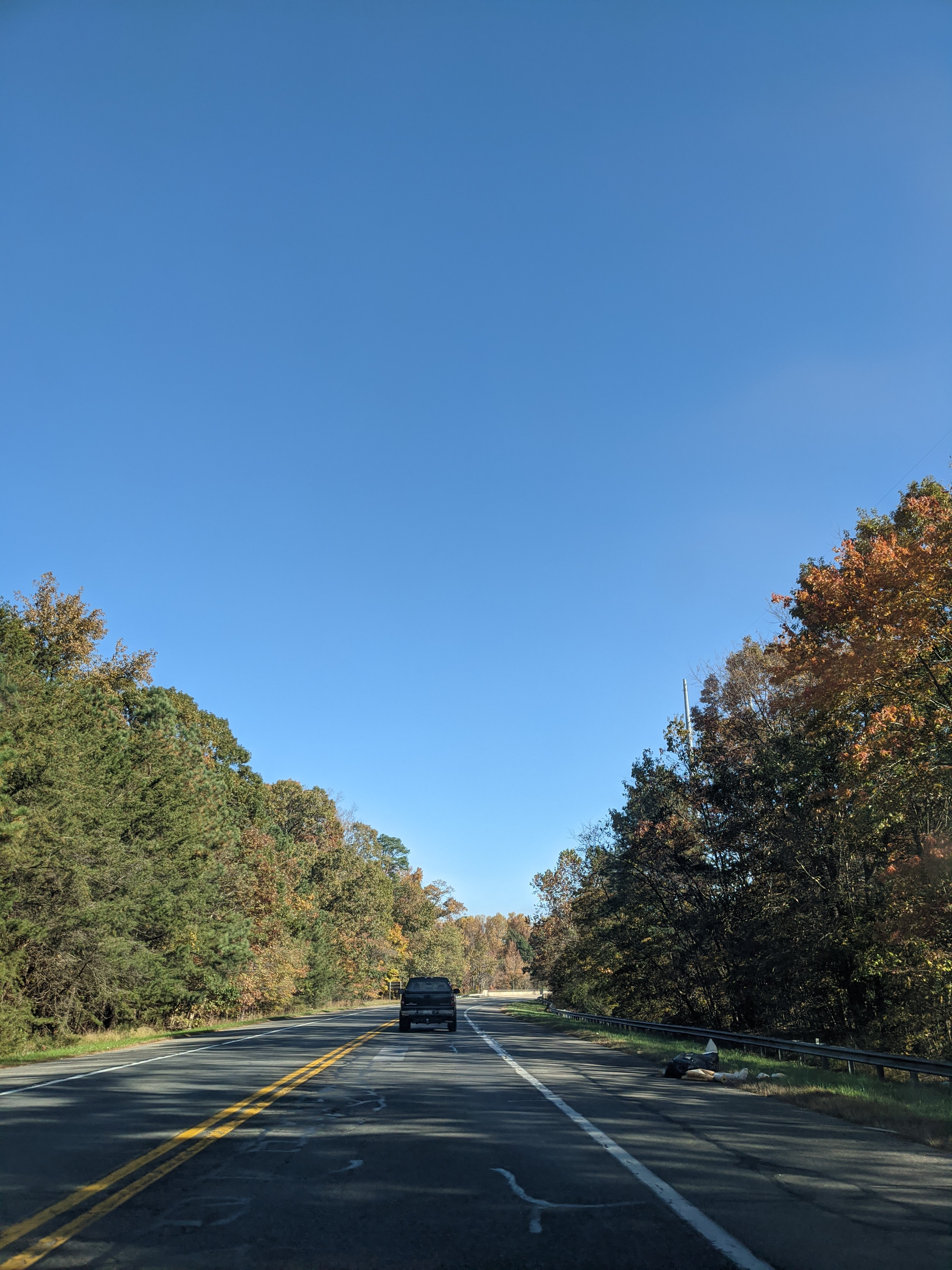
MD 4 northbound near California

MD 4 continues northwest as four-lane divided Southern Maryland Boulevard while MD 2 heads northeast as Solomons Island Road toward Annapolis. MD 4 immediately intersects MD 262 (Lower Marlboro Road) at another directional crossover intersection; the portion of MD 262 east of MD 4 has a right-in/right-out intersection with northbound MD 4. The highway crosses Chew Creek and Hall Creek on either side of Chaneyville, then passes through the town center of Dunkirk. Immediately south of the Calvert–Anne Arundel county line at Lyons Creek, MD 4 has a partial trumpet interchange with MD 260 (Chesapeake Beach Road); there is no access from MD 260 to southbound MD 4. The highway continues north paralleled by service roads briefly on the east (Fishers Station Road) and then on the west (MD 4 Service Road); both are segments of MD 980. A park and ride lot serving MTA Maryland commuter buses is located east of MD 4 north of the Lower Pindell Road intersection, with access from MD 980B service road. The divided highway and service road run north to Bristol, where the divided highway has a diamond interchange with MD 258 (Bay Front Road), which leads to MD 259 (Greenock Road) and MD 794 (Southern Maryland Boulevard).

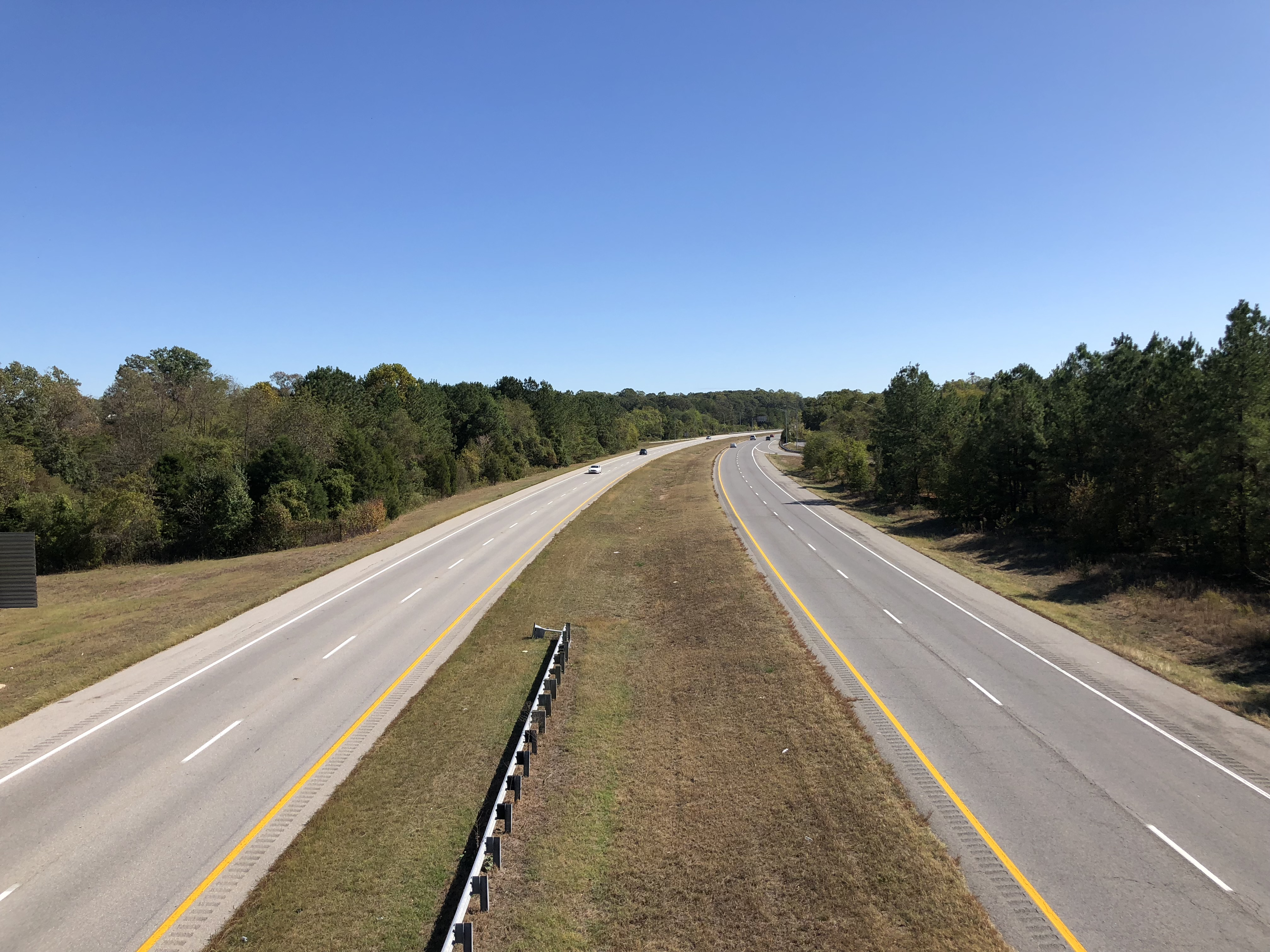
MD 4 southbound viewed from MD 408 in Waysons Corner

MD 4 continues northwest as Stephanie Roper Highway, with MD 794 (Southern Maryland Boulevard) paralleling on the northbound side. The southbound side is paralleled by another segment of MD 980 (MD 4 Service Road); there are ramps and right-in/right-out intersections with the parallel service roads on either side of Galloway Creek east of Jug Bay Wetlands Sanctuary. MD 4 curves west at its diamond interchange with MD 408 (Mt. Zion–Marlboro Road) at Waysons Corner. The highway crosses the Patuxent River into Prince George's County on Hills Bridge and has a northbound ramp to Marlboro Pike and a southbound ramp from Green Landing Road, which is unsigned MD 726. MD 4 has a cloverleaf interchange with U.S. Route 301 (Robert Crain Highway) and crosses over CSX's Pope's Creek Subdivision rail line. The freeway continues to the south of the town of Upper Marlboro, which is accessed via MD 4's diamond interchange with MD 717 (Water Street), which heads north toward the Prince George's County courthouse and county offices in the center of town and the Prince George's Equestrian Center and Show Place Arena to the south.

MD 4 continues west as Pennsylvania Avenue and crosses the Western Branch of the Patuxent River just west of MD 717. West of Upper Marlboro, the freeway has a half-diamond interchange with Old Crain Highway allowing access to and from the west and a modified diamond interchange with Ritchie Marlboro Road, the portion of which between the highway and parallel Old Marlboro Pike to the north is another segment of MD 980. MD 4 has a partial cloverleaf interchange with the eastern end of MD 223 (Woodyard Road) in Melwood before the freeway ends and the highway expands to six lanes at Dower House Road. The highway heads northwest along the northeastern edge of the Andrews Air Force Base to an intersection with Suitland Parkway, which provides access to the military installation and leads west to MD 337 (Allentown Road). North of the parkway, MD 4 drops to four lanes at its cloverleaf interchange with I-95/I-495 (Capital Beltway) in Forestville. The highway intersects Forestville Road, which leads to the parallel Marlboro Pike. MD 4 intersects MD 458 (Silver Hill Road) south of District Heights, then parallels Oxon Run between Coral Hills and Cedar Hill Cemetery before reaching the District of Columbia boundary on the northern edge of Suitland at Southern Avenue. Pennsylvania Avenue continues northwest straight toward downtown Washington.

== History ==
Maryland Route 416
- Location: Sunderland–Waysons Corner
- Existed: 1930–1965

MD 4 in Prince George's County was originally the Washington and Marlborough Turnpike, which exited the District of Columbia on Bowen Road, headed east to Forestville, south to Meadows, then east through Upper Marlboro to Hills Bridge on the Patuxent River. An unnamed road continued east to Solomons Island Road in Lothian. When the Maryland State Roads Commission was established in 1908, this route became one of the original state roads. In 1910, the highway was paved from the D.C. border to what is today District Heights, as well as from Hills Bridge to Waysons Corner, where MD 4 meets MD 408 today. Marlboro Pike from the D.C. line to Hills Bridge and Mt. Zion Road between Hills Bridge and Lothian was fully paved by 1927, which was the same year MD 4 was assigned to the two named roads. Southern Maryland Boulevard was built between Waysons Corner and MD 2 in Sunderland in 1929 and 1930, and was designated MD 416 by 1933.

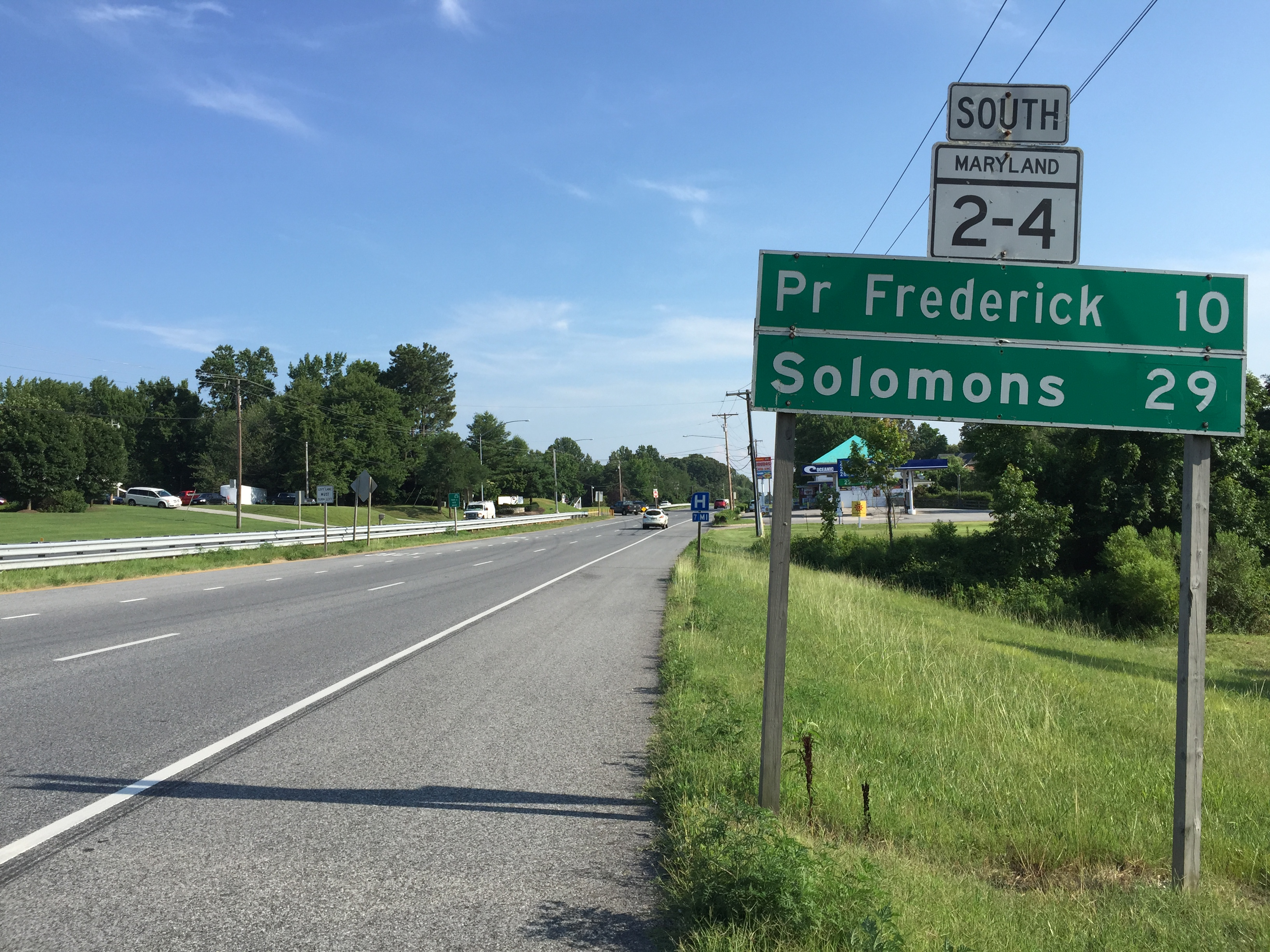
MD 2/MD 4 southbound in Calvert County past the north end of the concurrency

Pennsylvania Avenue was extended east out of D.C. to Dower House Road as a controlled access four-lane divided highway in 1959 and 1960 and was designated MD 4. Marlboro Pike was assigned MD 4 Business, a designation that was gone by 1970. Also in 1960, the MD 416 designation was extended south along MD 2 to Solomons. By 1970, the MD 4 freeway between Meadows and Hills Bridge was complete. In addition, MD 4 replaced MD 416 down Southern Maryland Boulevard and Solomons Island Road to Solomons, and the divided highway was extended south from Hills Bridge to MD 263. In turn, MD 408 was placed on what was previously MD 4 between Upper Marlboro and Lothian. The western extent of MD 408 was rolled back to Waysons Corner by 1980. MD 2-4 was also expanded to a divided highway south to Port Republic by 1980.

The next major change in the routing of MD 4 came in 1977, when the Governor Thomas Johnson Bridge was completed. The St. Mary's County side of the bridge unloaded onto county highways until 1982, when the modern, controlled access Patuxent Beach Road was completed to MD 235. MD 4 was then extended west from Solomons along Patuxent Beach Road and St. Andrew's Church Road to its present southern terminus in Leonardtown. MD 2-4 bypassed Port Republic and St. Leonard along a new alignment in 1984. The bypass of the old alignment between Lusby and Solomons was completed in 1985. The MD 4 freeway was extended to Bristol in 1993 and the interchange at MD 260 was completed in 2003.

In 2012, Maryland Route 4 between Bristol and Upper Marlboro received an additional honorary name for Stephanie Roper, an honor often reserved in Maryland for deceased state troopers and governors. After the murder of Stephanie Roper, her parents Roberta and Vincent Roper became national leaders regarding victims' rights and services including as founders of the Maryland Crime Victims' Resource Center, Inc.

In 2010, construction took place to improve the intersection of MD 2-4 and MD 231 in Prince Frederick, widening the road to six lanes in the vicinity of the intersection. This project was the first phase of a larger project to expand MD 2-4 to six lanes between MD 765 south of Prince Frederick and Stoakley Road north of Prince Frederick. In 2018, construction began on the second phase of widening between north of the MD 231 intersection and Fox Run Boulevard. The widening of this section was completed on November 23, 2020.

Another future project along MD 4 involves upgrading the highway between MD 223 in Melwood and the Capital Beltway in Forestville to a freeway featuring interchanges at the Suitland Parkway, Dower House Road, and Westphalia Road. There is also a planning study underway to explore building a new bridge adjacent to the Governor Thomas Johnson Bridge and expanding MD 4 to a four-lane divided highway between MD 2 at Solomons and MD 235 in California.

== Junction list ==
County	Location	mi	km	Destinations	Notes
St. Mary's	Leonardtown	0.00	0.00	MD 5 (Point Lookout Road) – Point Lookout, Leonardtown	Southern terminus
St. Mary's	California	6.10	9.82	MD 235 (Three Notch Road) – Waldorf, Lexington Park, Point Lookout	
Patuxent River		8.53– 9.85	13.73– 15.85	Governor Thomas Johnson Bridge	
Calvert	Solomons	10.07	16.21	MD 2 south (Solomons Island Road)	Interchange; south end of concurrency with MD 2
Calvert	Solomons	11.31	18.20	Monticello Drive west / Dowell Road east to MD 765	Superstreet intersection; Monticello Drive is unsigned MD 2AC; Dowell Road is unsigned MD 2V
Calvert	Lusby	12.38	19.92	Southern Connector Boulevard east to MD 765 – Drum Point	Directional crossover intersection; Southern Connector Boulevard is unsigned MD 765Z
Calvert	Lusby	13.16	21.18	MD 760 south (Rousby Hall Road) – Chesapeake Ranch Estates, Drum Point, Olivet	Directional crossover intersection; northern terminus of MD 760
Calvert	Lusby	14.26	22.95	MD 497 east (Cove Point Road) – Cove Point	Western terminus of MD 497
Calvert	Lusby	16.00	25.75	MD 765 (H.G. Trueman Road/Pardoe Road)	Officially MD 765Q
Calvert	Lusby	16.49	26.54	MD 765 south (Pardoe Road)	Northern terminus of MD 765Q
Calvert	St. Leonard	19.53	31.43	MD 765 north (St. Leonard Road)	Southern terminus of MD 765
Calvert	St. Leonard	21.61	34.78	Ball Road west / Calvert Beach Road east – Calvert Beach	Ball Road is unsigned MD 765S; Calvert Beach Road is unsigned MD 765J
Calvert	Port Republic	23.67	38.09	MD 509 east (Governor Run Road) to MD 765 – Port Republic	Signed as MD 509 but officially MD 765B; western terminus of MD 509
Calvert	Port Republic	24.52	39.46	MD 264 south (Broomes Island Road) / MD 765 south (St. Leonard Road) – St. Leonard	Directional crossover intersection with MD 264; right-in/right-out intersection between northbound MD 2-4 and MD 765; northern terminus of MD 264; northern terminus of MD 765
Calvert	Prince Frederick	26.16	42.10	MD 506 west (Sixes Road)	Eastern terminus of MD 506
Calvert	Prince Frederick	26.85	43.21	MD 765 north (Main Street)	Officially MD 765A; southern terminus of MD 765A
Calvert	Prince Frederick	28.41	45.72	MD 231 (Hallowing Point Road/Church Street) – Hughesville	
Calvert	Prince Frederick	28.97	46.62	MD 765 south (Main Street)	Northern terminus of MD 765A
Calvert	Prince Frederick	29.11	46.85	MD 402 east (Dares Beach Road)	Western terminus of MD 402
Calvert		31.88	51.31	MD 263 east (Plum Point Road) – Parran, Plum Point	Directional crossover intersection; western terminus of MD 263
Calvert	Huntingtown	34.11	54.89	MD 524 north (Old Town Road) – Huntingtown Town Center	Southern terminus of MD 524
Calvert	Huntingtown	34.79	55.99	MD 524 south (Old Town Road) – Huntingtown Town Center	Superstreet intersection; northern terminus of MD 524
Calvert	Sunderland	37.47	60.30	MD 2 north (Solomons Island Road) – Annapolis	North end of concurrency with MD 2
Calvert	Sunderland	37.63	60.56	MD 262 west (Lower Marlboro Road) – Lower Marlboro	Directional crossover intersection with MD 262; right-in/right-out intersection between northbound MD 4 and MD 262A; eastern terminus of MD 262; western terminus of MD 262A
Calvert	Lyons Creek	45.59	73.37	MD 260 east (Chesapeake Beach Road) – Chesapeake Beach, North Beach, Recreation Areas	Trumpet interchange; western terminus of MD 260; no access from MD 260 to southbound MD 4
Anne Arundel	Bristol	48.65	78.29	MD 258 east (Bay Front Road) / MD 259 north (Greenock Road) / MD 794 north (Southern Maryland Boulevard) – Bristol, Deale	Diamond interchange; western terminus of MD 258; southern terminus of MD 259; southern terminus of MD 794
Anne Arundel	Bristol	49.09	79.00	Plummer Lane	Right-in/right-out interchange southbound
Anne Arundel	Waysons Corner	50.06	80.56	MD 408 east (Mt. Zion-Marlboro Road) – Waysons Corner, Annapolis	Diamond interchange; western terminus of MD 408
Prince George's	Upper Marlboro	51.08	82.21	Old Marlboro Pike west	Northbound exit, southbound entrance; northbound ramp is officially MD 4PA; southbound ramp from unsigned MD 726
Prince George's	Upper Marlboro	51.99	83.67	US 301 (Robert Crain Highway) – Baltimore, Richmond	Cloverleaf interchange
Prince George's	Upper Marlboro	52.64	84.72	MD 717 (Water Street) – Upper Marlboro	Diamond interchange
Prince George's	Upper Marlboro	53.48	86.07	Old Crain Highway	Southbound exit, northbound entrance
Prince George's	Upper Marlboro	54.16	87.16	Ritchie–Marlboro Road west	Interchange
Prince George's	Melwood	56.87	91.52	MD 223 south (Woodyard Road) / Mellwood Road north – Clinton	Partial cloverleaf interchange; northern terminus of MD 223
Prince George's	Westphalia	58.99	94.94	Suitland Parkway (MD 337 south) – Andrews Air Force Base, Camp Springs, Washington	
Prince George's	Westphalia–Forestville line	59.93	96.45	I-95 / I-495 (Capital Beltway) – College Park, Baltimore, Alexandria, Richmond	I-95/I-495 Exit 11
Prince George's	Suitland	62.48	100.55	MD 458 (Silver Hill Road) – District Heights, Silver Hill	
Prince George's	Suitland	64.85	104.37	Pennsylvania Avenue west / Southern Avenue – Washington	District of Columbia boundary; northern terminus
1.000 mi = 1.609 km; 1.000 km = 0.621 mi: Concurrency terminus; Incomplete access
