= Maryland Route 408 =

State highway in Maryland, United States

Maryland Route 408
- Mount Zion-Marlboro Road
- Maryland Route 408 highlighted in red

Route information
- Maintained by MDSHA
- Length: 5.62 mi (9.04 km)
- Existed: 1965–present

Major junctions
- West end: MD 4 at Waysons Corner
- MD 794 at Waysons Corner; MD 259 near Lothian
- East end: MD 2 / MD 422 in Lothian

Location
- Country: United States
- State: Maryland
- Counties: Anne Arundel

Highway system
- Maryland highway system; Interstate; US; State; Scenic Byways
← MD 407	→ MD 410

Maryland Route 408 (MD 408) is a state highway in the U.S. state of Maryland. Known as Mount Zion-Marlboro Road, the highway runs 5.62 miles (9.04 km) from MD 4 at Waysons Corner east to MD 2 and MD 422 in Lothian. MD 408 is the old alignment of MD 4 in southern Anne Arundel County. The highway was constructed in the late 1910s and became the easternmost part of MD 4 in 1927. The highway received its present designation in the mid-1960s when MD 4 was rerouted south into Calvert County. MD 408's western end was relocated when MD 4 was upgraded to a freeway through Waysons Corner in the early 1990s. MD 408 was also applied to the old sections of MD 4 between Andrews Air Force Base and Upper Marlboro in Prince George's County. The number was assigned after the MD 4 freeway was completed in the mid-1960s. The Prince George's County portions of MD 408 were transferred to county maintenance in the late 1970s except the section through Upper Marlboro, which became MD 725.

== Route description ==
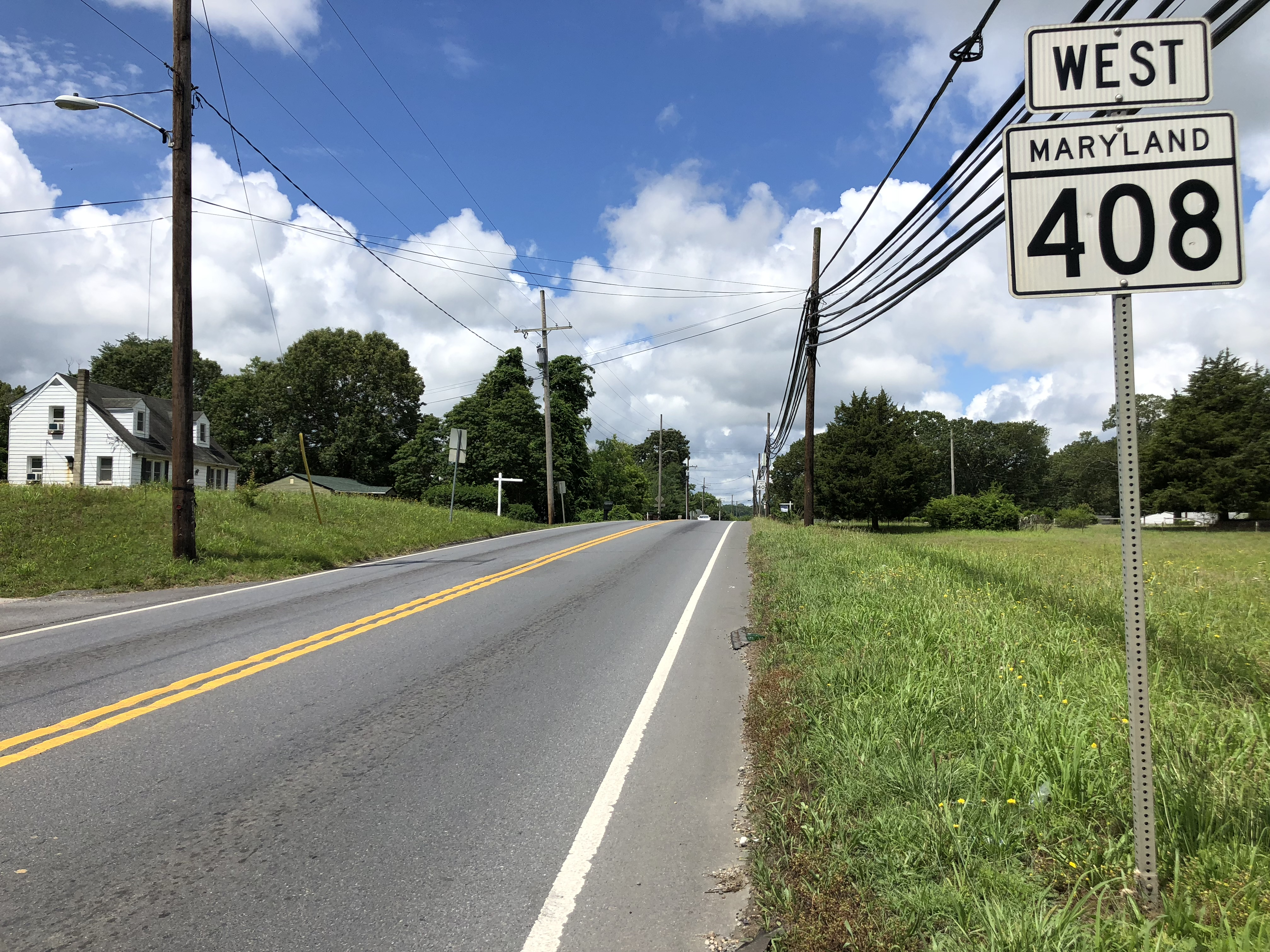
View west along MD 408 in Waysons Corner

MD 408 begins at a three-quarter diamond interchange with MD 4 (Stephanie Roper Highway) just west of Waysons Corner. The roadway continues south from the interchange as MD 980A, a service road that curves east and parallels southbound MD 4 toward Bristol. The missing ramp in the diamond interchange, the movement from northbound MD 4 to MD 408, is made via MD 794 (Southern Maryland Boulevard) just to the southeast. MD 408 continues east as a two-lane undivided road through a mix of commercial development, residences, and farmland. The highway veers northeast beyond its intersection with MD 259 (Greenock Road) and passes the historic home Quarter Place. MD 408 reaches its eastern terminus in Lothian at a four-way roundabout from which MD 2 (Solomons Island Road) heads northeast toward Annapolis and southeast in the direction of Prince Frederick, and MD 422 heads northwest along Bayard Road.

== History ==
MD 408 is the old alignment of MD 4 from Waysons Corner to Lothian. With the road from Washington to Waysons Corner, the highway was included in the original state road system designed by the Maryland State Roads Commission in 1909 as part of the main road between Washington and Annapolis. The highway was constructed as a 14-foot-wide (4.3 m) gravel road between 1916 and 1919 and designated the eastern end of MD 4 in 1927. MD 4 was paved and widened from Waysons Corner to Lothian by 1946. The highway was widened from the Patuxent River to MD 416 (now MD 794) as part of intersection improvements at the MD 4–MD 416 intersection in 1950. MD 4 replaced MD 416 on Southern Maryland Boulevard and MD 408 was assigned to the old course of MD 4 between Waysons Corner and Lothian in 1965. MD 408 was relocated at its western end when MD 4 was reconstructed and the MD 4–MD 408 interchange was built in 1993. The roundabout at MD 408's eastern terminus was installed in 1995.

MD 408 was also assigned to much of the old alignment of MD 4 from Meadows, a community east of Andrews Air Force Base, to the Patuxent River. The highway from Washington to Upper Marlboro was once a turnpike and, as of 1898, was the longest gravel road (12 miles (19 km)) in the state. The old turnpike from Meadows to the western limit of Upper Marlboro was reconstructed as a macadam road by 1915, the same year the highway from the eastern limit of Upper Marlboro to the Patuxent River was constructed as a 14-foot-wide (4.3 m) concrete road. The portion of the highway through Upper Marlboro was built as a concrete road between 1916 and 1919. Marlboro Pike was widened with a pair of 3-foot-wide (0.91 m) concrete shoulders and resurfaced in 1926. The road through Meadows, now Old Marlboro Pike and several roads on the grounds of Andrews Air Force Base, was bypassed along MD 4's modern alignment in 1939. Along its concurrency with US 301 through Upper Marlboro, MD 4 was widened with a pair of 3-foot-wide (0.91 m) concrete shoulders in 1946. MD 4 was widened to 24 feet (7.3 m) and resurfaced from US 301 at Wells Corner to the Patuxent River in 1948.

MD 4's freeway bypass of Upper Marlboro was built from Ritchie–Marlboro Road east to the Patuxent River between 1959 and 1962. The freeway was extended west to Dower House Road beyond the MD 223 interchange in 1964. In 1965, MD 408 was assigned to Marlboro Pike from Dower House Road to MD 223, Old Marlboro Pike from MD 223 to Upper Marlboro, Main Street through Upper Marlboro, and Marlboro Pike from Upper Marlboro to the freeway just west of the Patuxent River. These roads were transferred to county maintenance in 1977 except from Brown Station Road through Upper Marlboro to US 301; that stretch was designated MD 725 by 1987.

== Junction list ==
The entire route is in Anne Arundel County.

Location	mi	km	Destinations	Notes
Waysons Corner	0.00	0.00	MD 4 (Stephanie Roper Highway) – Upper Marlboro, Prince Frederick	Diamond interchange; western terminus
Waysons Corner	0.15	0.24	MD 794 south (Southern Maryland Boulevard) – Bristol	Northern terminus of MD 794
Lothian	4.19	6.74	MD 259 south (Greenock Road) – Bristol, Prince Frederick	Northern terminus of MD 259
Lothian	5.62	9.04	MD 2 (Solomons Island Road) / MD 422 west (Bayard Road) – Annapolis, Prince Frederick	Roundabout; eastern terminus; eastern terminus of MD 422
1.000 mi = 1.609 km; 1.000 km = 0.621 mi

== Auxiliary routes ==
- MD 408A is the designation for the Patuxent Wetland Park entrance road, which runs 0.42 miles (0.68 km) from a cul-de-sac east to MD 408B at Waysons Corner.
- MD 408B is designation for an unnamed road that runs 0.03 miles (0.048 km) from MD 408, between MD 4 and MD 794, north to the end of state maintenance at Waysons Corner. MD 408B connects MD 408 with MD 408A, some businesses, and a trailer park.
