= Maryland Route 258 =

State highway in Maryland, United States

Maryland Route 258
- Bay Front Road
- Maryland Route 258 highlighted in red

Route information
- Maintained by MDSHA
- Length: 7.13 mi (11.47 km)
- Existed: 1928–present

Major junctions
- West end: Wrighton Road in Bristol
- MD 4 in Bristol; MD 2 near Tracys Landing
- East end: MD 256 in Deale

Location
- Country: United States
- State: Maryland
- Counties: Anne Arundel

Highway system
- Maryland highway system; Interstate; US; State; Scenic Byways
← MD 257	→ MD 259

Maryland Route 258 (MD 258) is a state highway in the U.S. state of Maryland. Known as Bay Front Road, the route runs 7.13 miles (11.47 km) from Wrighton Road in Bristol east to MD 256 in Deale. MD 258 is the main connection between MD 4 and the southern Anne Arundel County bayside communities of Deale and Shady Side. MD 258 was constructed from MD 2 at Tracys Landing west to Bristol in the late 1920s and early 1930s. The highway was rebuilt at its western end and extended east from MD 2 to MD 256 in the early 1960s.

== Route description ==
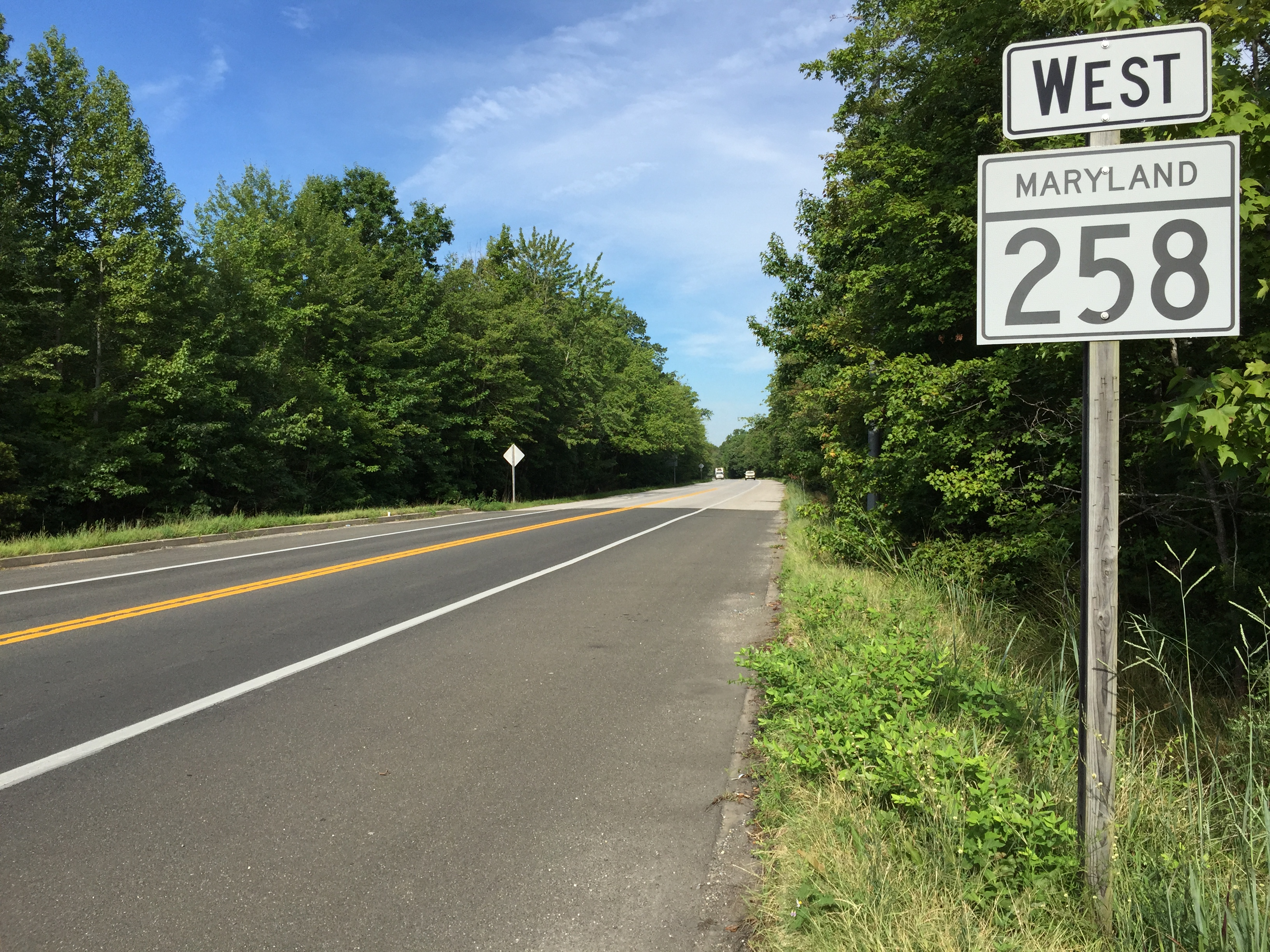
View west at the east end of MD 258 at MD 256 in Deale

MD 258 begins at an intersection with Wrighton Road, a county-maintained road, and an off-ramp from southbound MD 4 (Southern Maryland Boulevard) in Bristol. This intersection is just east of the northern end of Southern Maryland Boulevard, a frontage road that parallels southbound MD 4. A park and ride lot serving MTA Maryland commuter buses is located east of this intersection. MD 258 curves east, comes to a ramp to southbound MD 4, and crosses the freeway. East of the freeway, the highway intersects an exit ramp from northbound MD 4 and the southern end of MD 794, another segment of Southern Maryland Boulevard that provides access to northbound MD 4 and MD 259 (Greenock Road). MD 258 continues east as a two-lane undivided road that crosses Cabin Branch and passes south of the historic home Portland Manor. The highway has intersections with a loop of the highway's old alignment, MD 796A, and crosses Lyons Creek before intersecting MD 2 (Solomons Island Road) just north of the hamlet of Tracys Landing. MD 258 continues east, bypassing the waterside community of Deale to the north. The highway crosses narrow Traceys Creek and wide Rockhold Creek before reaching its eastern terminus at a roundabout with MD 256 (Deale Churchton Road), which heads south into Deale and north toward Shady Side.

== History ==
MD 258 was constructed as a gravel road from MD 2 to west of Lyons Creek in 1928. The highway was extended to a point east of Cabin Branch in 1929 and 1930. The remainder of MD 258 west to Bristol was started in 1930 and completed by 1933. The western terminus was originally at MD 416, which became MD 4 in 1965; the intersecting roadway at the terminus is now part of MD 794. MD 258 was paved in 1949. The highway was extended west to its present terminus at Wrighton Road when MD 416 was expanded to a four-lane divided highway and its interchange with MD 258 was built in 1961. The portion of MD 258 between MD 2 and MD 256 was built on a new alignment in 1963. The roundabout at MD 258's terminus at MD 256 was installed in 2007.

== Junction list ==
The entire route is in Anne Arundel County.

Location	mi	km	Destinations	Notes
Bristol	0.00	0.00	Wrighton Road	Western terminus; north leg of intersection is exit ramp from southbound MD 4
Bristol	0.17	0.27	MD 4 south (Southern Maryland Boulevard) – Prince Frederick	Entrance ramp to southbound MD 4 only
Bristol	0.29	0.47	MD 794 north (Southern Maryland Boulevard) to MD 4 north / MD 259 north – Upper Marlboro	
Tracys Landing	4.26	6.86	MD 2 (Solomons Island Road) – Annapolis, Prince Frederick	
Deale	7.13	11.47	MD 256 (Deale Churchton Road) – Shady Side	Roundabout; eastern terminus
1.000 mi = 1.609 km; 1.000 km = 0.621 mi: Incomplete access
