= Maryland Route 259 =

State highway in Maryland, United States

Maryland Route 259
- Greenock Road
- Maryland Route 259 highlighted in red

Route information
- Maintained by MDSHA
- Length: 2.67 mi (4.30 km)
- Existed: 1928–present

Major junctions
- South end: MD 794 in Bristol
- North end: MD 408 near Lothian

Location
- Country: United States
- State: Maryland
- Counties: Anne Arundel

Highway system
- Maryland highway system; Interstate; US; State; Scenic Byways
← MD 258	→ MD 260

Maryland Route 259 (MD 259) is a state highway in the U.S. state of Maryland. Known as Greenock Road, the highway runs 2.67 miles (4.30 km) from MD 794 in Bristol north to MD 408 near Lothian. MD 259 was constructed in the late 1920s and early 1930s.

== Route description ==
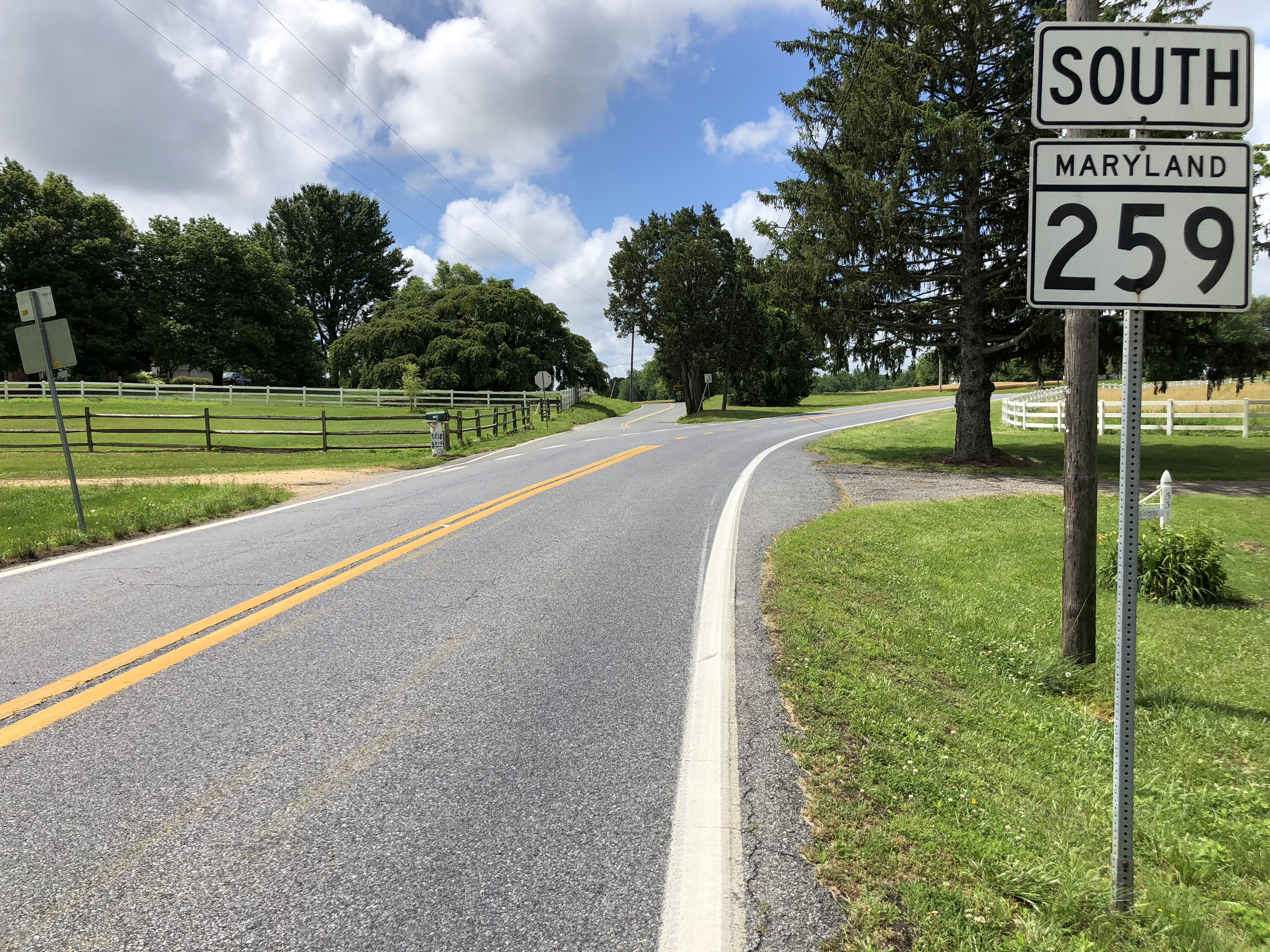
View south along MD 259 past MD 408 near Lothian

MD 259 begins at an acute intersection with MD 794 (Southern Maryland Boulevard) in Bristol. MD 794 leads to MD 258 (Bay Front Road) and MD 4. MD 259 heads northeast as a two-lane undivided road that passes southeast of the historic James Owens Farm. The highway reaches its northern terminus at an intersection with MD 408 (Mount Zion-Marlboro Road) at the hamlet of Greenock southwest of Lothian.

== History ==
MD 259 was constructed as a gravel road from MD 4 (now MD 408) at Greenock southwest to north of the James Owens Farm in 1928. The highway was completed southwest to MD 416 (now MD 794) in Bristol in 1933 and 1934. MD 259 was paved in 1949.

== Junction list ==
The entire route is in Anne Arundel County.

Location	mi	km	Destinations	Notes
Bristol	0.00	0.00	MD 794 (Southern Maryland Boulevard) to MD 4 / MD 258 – Upper Marlboro, Prince Frederick	Southern terminus
Lothian	2.67	4.30	MD 408 (Mount Zion–Marlboro Road) – Lothian, Upper Marlboro	Northern terminus
1.000 mi = 1.609 km; 1.000 km = 0.621 mi
