= Maryland Route 468 =

State highway in Maryland, United States

Maryland Route 468
- Maryland Route 468 highlighted in red

Route information
- Maintained by MDSHA
- Length: 11.19 mi (18.01 km)
- Existed: 1933–present
- Tourist routes: Roots and Tides Scenic Byway

Major junctions
- South end: Snug Harbor Road in Shady Side
- MD 256 near Shady Side; MD 255 in Galesville
- North end: MD 214 in Edgewater

Location
- Country: United States
- State: Maryland
- Counties: Anne Arundel

Highway system
- Maryland highway system; Interstate; US; State; Scenic Byways
← MD 464	→ MD 470

Maryland Route 468 (MD 468) is a state highway in the U.S. state of Maryland. The highway runs 11.19 miles (18.01 km) from Snug Harbor Road in Shady Side north to MD 214 in Edgewater in Anne Arundel County. MD 468 is a J-shaped route that connects Edgewater with the Chesapeake Bay communities of Galesville and Shady Side. The Galesville–Shady Side road was constructed as part of MD 255 in the 1920s. MD 468 was constructed north of MD 255 in the early 1930s. MD 255 was rerouted to enter Galesville and MD 468 was extended along MD 255's old route to Shady Side in the late 1940s.

== Route description ==
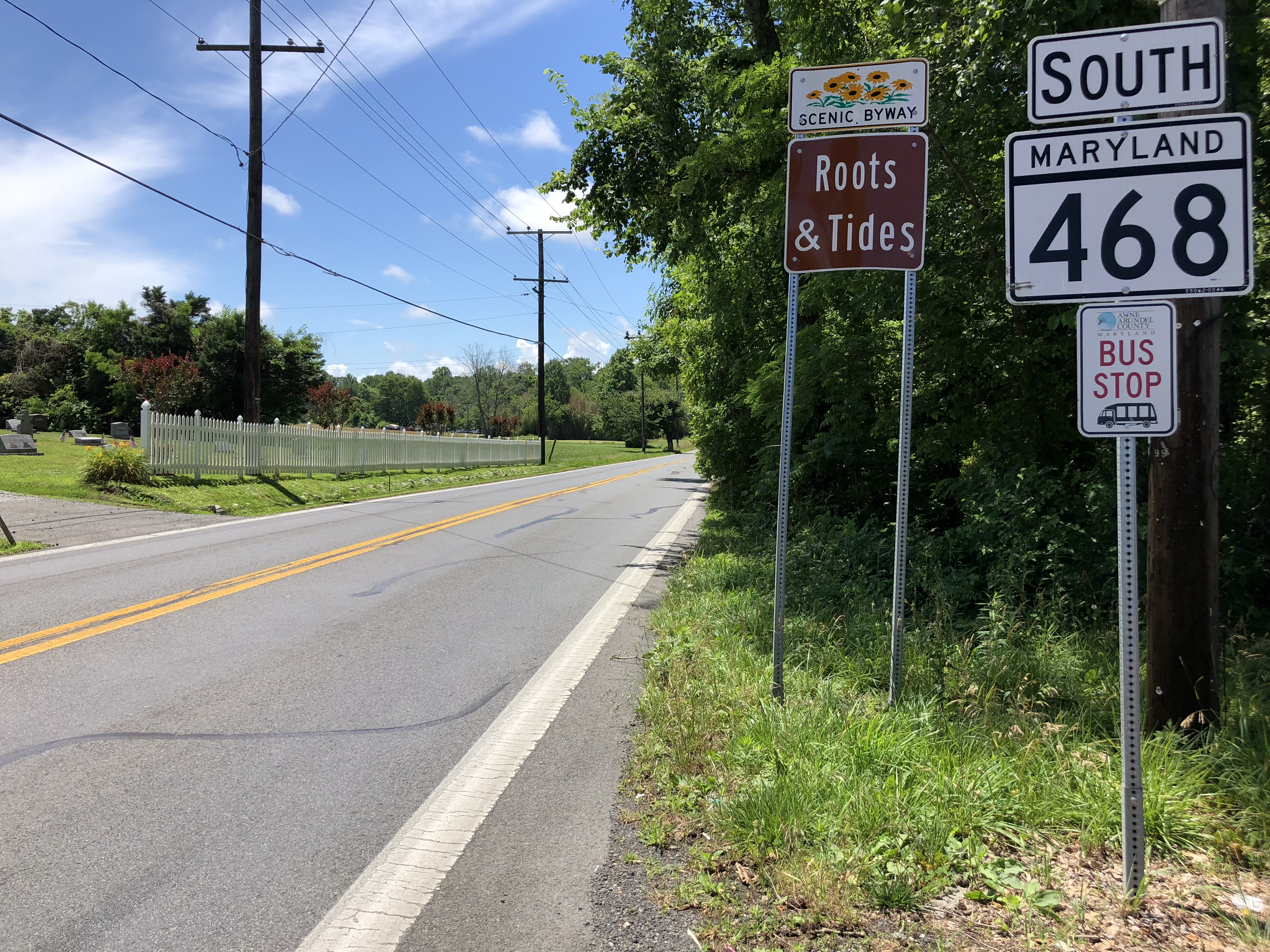
View south along MD 468 at MD 255 in Galesville

MD 468 begins at an intersection with West Shady Side Road, which heads north toward the Capt. Salem Avery House, and Snug Harbor Road, which heads east toward Snug Harbor Park and the Idlewilde peninsula. The highway heads south as two-lane undivided Shady Side Road. MD 468 gradually curves to the west and meets the eastern end of MD 256 (Deale Churchton Road) as the highway passes north of the hamlet of Churchton. The highway continues west as Muddy Creek Road and intersects Sudley Road, which provides access to the historic home Sudley. MD 468 gradually curves to the north and crosses three streams that flow into the West River. The highway intersects MD 255 adjacent to the Quaker Burying Ground; the highway heads east as Galesville Road into the namesake village and west as Owensville Road. MD 468 passes to the west of three historic homes: Tulip Hill, which is accessed directly from the route; and Cedar Park and Parkhurst. After passing Old Muddy Creek Road, an old alignment, the road crosses over several branches of Muddy Creek within the Birds Mill Swamp. After leaving the swamp, the road passes Contee Wharf Road and South River Clubhouse Road. The former road leads east to the Smithsonian Environmental Research Center and the latter passes the historic meeting place of the South River Club. After passing another old alignment of MD 468 in Clydesdale Road, the road meets its northern terminus at MD 214 (Central Avenue) on the southeastern edge of Edgewater.

== History ==
MD 468 originally included Muddy Creek Road from MD 255 north to Edgewater. The portion of MD 468 from MD 255 to Shady Side was part of MD 255 and the highway from the MD 255–MD 468 intersection east to Galesville was MD 393. The first work done along MD 468's modern course was grading work from the MD 255–MD 468 intersection south to Sudley Road in 1920. The gravel highway was completed between those intersections in 1921 and proposed to extend to the modern intersection with MD 256. The highway extended to Deep Creek Road on the south side of Shady Side in 1923. MD 255 was completed to Shady Side in 1929 and 1930. MD 468 was constructed in three sections. The first section from MD 253 (now MD 214) south to near Collins Road was started in 1930 and completed as a gravel road by 1933. The highway was extended south to Lansdale Road in 1932 and 1933. MD 468 was completed to MD 255 in 1933 and 1934. By 1934, traffic on the Galesville–Shady Side segment was dense enough that the road was recommended to be widened from 16 to 20 feet (4.9 to 6.1 m). MD 468 was extended south along MD 255's route to Shady Side and MD 255 replaced MD 393 into Galesville in 1949. MD 468 originally followed what are now Old Muddy Creek Road and Clydesdale Road. Those curvaceous segments were replaced with the current straighter alignment in 1960. MD 468 once extended a short distance along Snug Harbor Road from its present terminus in Shady Side. The highway was retracted to its present terminus by 1987.

== Junction list ==
The entire route is in Anne Arundel County.

Location	mi	km	Destinations	Notes
Shady Side	0.00	0.00	Snug Harbor Road east / West Shady Side Road north	Southern terminus
Shady Side	2.83	4.55	MD 256 west (Deale Churchton Road) – Deale	Eastern terminus of MD 256
Galesville	6.23	10.03	MD 255 (Galesville Road/Owensville Road)	
Edgewater	11.19	18.01	MD 214 (Central Avenue) – Davidsonville, Mayo	Northern terminus
1.000 mi = 1.609 km; 1.000 km = 0.621 mi

== Auxiliary route ==
MD 468B is the designation for an unnamed 0.01-mile (0.016 km) spur from MD 468 east to a gate between Collins Road and South River Clubhouse Road near Edgewater.
