= Maryland Route 794 =

State highway in Maryland, United States

Maryland Route 794
- Southern Maryland Boulevard

Route information
- Maintained by MDSHA
- Length: 2.75 mi (4.43 km)
- Existed: 1962–present

Major junctions
- South end: MD 4 in Bristol
- MD 258 in Bristol; MD 259 in Bristol
- North end: MD 408 at Waysons Corner

Location
- Country: United States
- State: Maryland
- Counties: Anne Arundel

Highway system
- Maryland highway system; Interstate; US; State; Scenic Byways
← MD 788	→ I-795

Maryland Route 794 (MD 794) is a state highway in the U.S. state of Maryland. Known as Southern Maryland Boulevard, the highway runs 2.75 miles (4.43 km) from MD 4 in Bristol north to MD 408 at Waysons Corner in southwestern Anne Arundel County. MD 794 is the old alignment of MD 4 between Bristol and Waysons Corner. Southern Maryland Boulevard was constructed in the late 1920s and was designated MD 416. MD 416 was expanded to a divided highway in the early 1960s, shortly before MD 416 became part of MD 4. Northbound MD 4 followed the original alignment of MD 416 until MD 4 was upgraded to a freeway in the early 1990s and MD 794 was extended along its current course.

== Route description ==
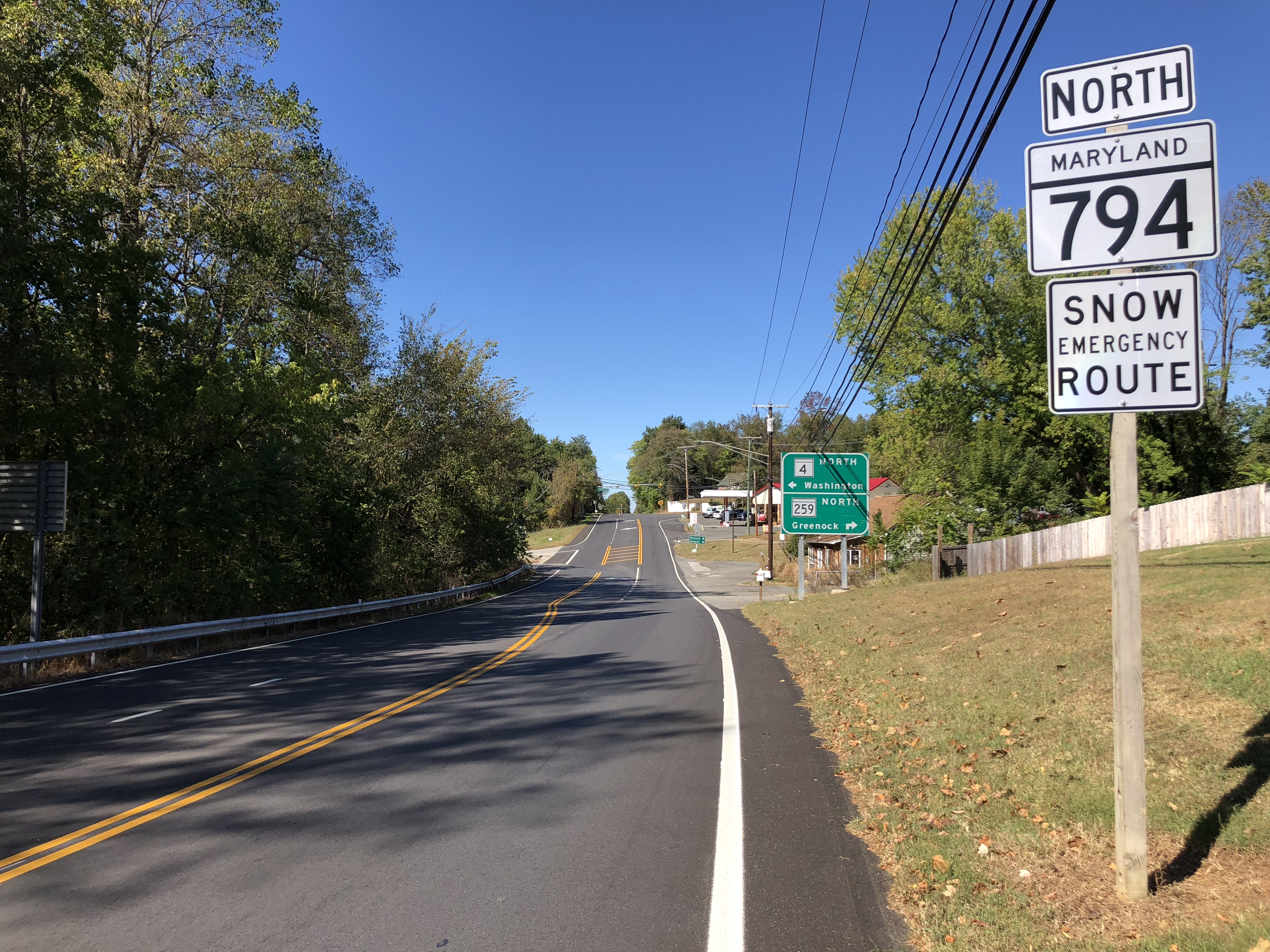
View north along MD 794 at MD 258 in Bristol

MD 794 begins as an exit ramp from northbound MD 4 in Bristol. The road becomes a two-way, two-lane undivided road at its intersection with MD 258 (Bay Front Road). After passing an entrance ramp to northbound MD 4 and the southern terminus of MD 259 (Greenock Road), MD 794 heads in a straight line northwest. The road crosses Galloway Creek and receives a pair of exit ramps from MD 4, with a park and ride lot serving MTA Maryland commuter buses located southwest of the road between the ramps, before reaching its northern terminus at MD 408 (Mount Zion–Marlboro Road) at Waysons Corner.

== History ==
MD 794 was originally constructed as the northernmost part of the Southern Maryland Boulevard, a highway built on a completely new alignment to better connect Calvert County with Upper Marlboro and Washington. The new highway was constructed as an 18-foot (5.5 m) wide concrete road from MD 4 at Waysons Corner south to MD 2 at Sunderland in 1929 and 1930. Southern Maryland Boulevard was marked as MD 416 by 1933. In 1934, the Maryland State Roads Commission proposed MD 416 be widened to 20 feet (6.1 m). The highway was widened from 18 to 22 feet (5.5 to 6.7 m) from Waysons Corner south into Calvert County in 1948. MD 416 was widened to 33 feet (10 m) at its intersection with MD 4 in 1950.

MD 416 was expanded to a four-lane divided highway in Anne Arundel County in 1961 and 1962, including an interchange with MD 258. For the expansion project, a new roadway was constructed for southbound MD 416 and the existing roadway was turned into the highway's northbound lanes. The exception was at the MD 258 interchange, through which a new northbound roadway was constructed. The ramps between northbound MD 416 and MD 258, which were part of the original MD 416, became the southernmost portion of modern MD 794. MD 416 was renumbered MD 4 and MD 4 east of Waysons Corner became MD 408 in 1965. MD 4 was upgraded to a freeway through Waysons Corner and Bristol in 1991. A new roadway was constructed for northbound MD 4 between southbound MD 4 and the old northbound lanes; the old northbound lanes became a northern extension of MD 794 to its present terminus.

== Junction list ==
The entire route is in Anne Arundel County.

Location	mi	km	Destinations	Notes
Bristol	0.00	0.00	MD 4 north	Southern terminus; exit ramp from northbound MD 4
Bristol	0.34	0.55	MD 258 (Bay Front Road) to MD 4 south – Deale, Prince Frederick	
Bristol	0.43	0.69	MD 4 north – Upper Marlboro	Entrance ramp onto northbound MD 4
Bristol	0.50	0.80	MD 259 north (Greenock Road) – Lothian, Annapolis	Southern terminus of MD 259
Waysons Corner	2.75	4.43	MD 408 (Mount Zion–Marlboro Road) to MD 4 – Lothian, Upper Marlboro	Northern terminus
1.000 mi = 1.609 km; 1.000 km = 0.621 mi: Incomplete access
