= Bill Eagle =

American baseball player (1877–1951)

- Outfielder
- Born: July 25, 1877; Rockville, Maryland, U.S.
- Died: April 27, 1951 (aged 73); Churchton, Maryland, U.S.
- Batted: Unknown Threw: Unknown

MLB debut
- August 20, 1898, for the Washington Senators

Last MLB appearance
- August 22, 1898, for the Washington Senators

MLB statistics
- At bats: 13
- RBI: 2
- Home runs: 0
- Batting average: .308
- Stats at Baseball Reference

Teams
- Washington Senators (1898)

William Lycurgus Eagle (July 25, 1877 – April 27, 1951) was an American professional baseball player who played four games during the 1898 season. He was born in Rockville, Maryland, and died at the age of 73 in Churchton, Maryland.
