= Maryland Route 422 =

State highway in Maryland, United States

Maryland Route 422
- Bayard Road
- Maryland Route 422 highlighted in red

Route information
- Maintained by MDSHA
- Length: 3.04 mi (4.89 km)
- Existed: 1930–present

Major junctions
- West end: Polling House Road near Lothian
- East end: MD 2 / MD 408 in Lothian

Location
- Country: United States
- State: Maryland
- Counties: Anne Arundel

Highway system
- Maryland highway system; Interstate; US; State; Scenic Byways
← MD 418	→ MD 423

Maryland Route 422 (MD 422) is a state highway in the U.S. state of Maryland. Known as Bayard Road, the highway runs 3.04 miles (4.89 km) from Polling House Road near Lothian east to MD 2 and MD 408 at Lothian in southern Anne Arundel County. MD 422 was constructed in the late 1920s.

== Route description ==
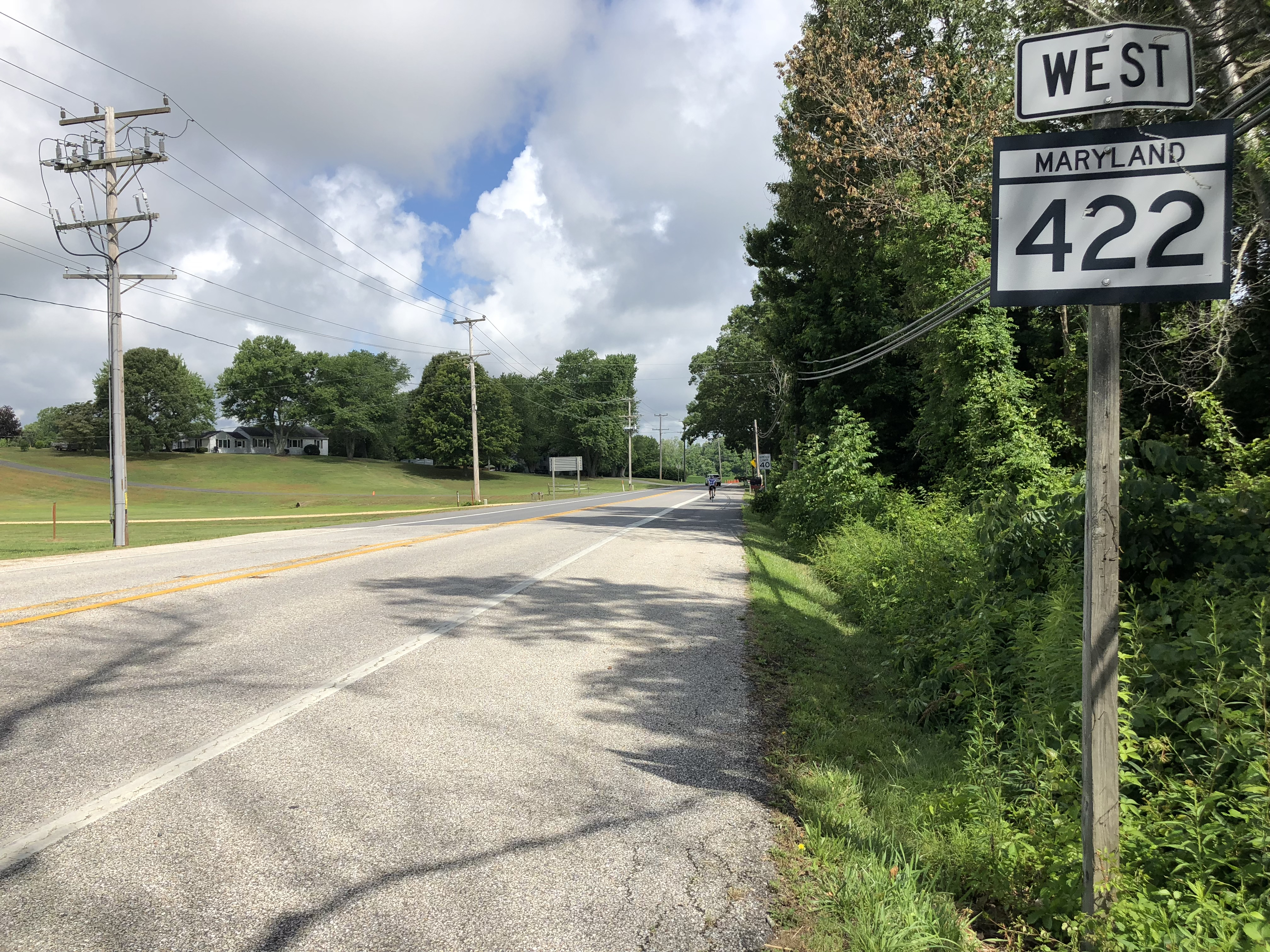
View west at the east end of MD 422 at MD 2/MD 408 in Lothian

MD 422 begins at Polling House Road west of Lothian. Bayard Road continues west as a county highway through the hamlet of Bayard to Sands Road, which parallels the Patuxent River. MD 422 heads east as a two-lane undivided road through farmland. After passing South Polling House Road, which meets Polling House Road in Harwood, the highway turns southeast toward its terminus at a four-legged roundabout in the village of Lothian. MD 2 (Solomons Island Road) heads southeast toward Prince Frederick and northeast in the direction of Annapolis; MD 408 (Mount Zion-Marlboro Road) heads southwest toward Upper Marlboro.

== History ==
MD 422 was constructed as a gravel road in 1929 and 1930 from Polling House Road to Lothian, which was previously known as Mount Zion. The Lothian roundabout was installed in 1995.

== Junction list ==
The entire route is in Anne Arundel County.

Location	mi	km	Destinations	Notes
	0.00	0.00	Bayard Road west / Polling House Road north	Western terminus
Lothian	3.04	4.89	MD 2 (Solomons Island Road) / MD 408 west (Mount Zion-Marlboro Road) – Annapolis, Prince Frederick, Upper Marlboro	Lothian Roundabout; eastern terminus; eastern terminus of MD 408
1.000 mi = 1.609 km; 1.000 km = 0.621 mi
