= CVRA =

CVRA may refer to:

- Crime Victims' Rights Act, 18 USC 3771, which enumerates the rights of victims of federal crimes;
- California Voting Rights Act
- Chippewa Valley Regional Airport
