= Quarter Place =

Historic house in Maryland, United States

- U.S. National Register of Historic Places
- Location within Maryland Location within the United States
- Nearest city: 216 Marlboro Rd., Lothian, Maryland
- Coordinates: 38°49′29.68″N 76°37′34.65″W
- Built: 1860
- Architect: William H. Peake, Jr
- Architectural style: Gothic Revival
- NRHP reference No.: 09001094
- Added to NRHP: December 18, 2009

Quarter Place is a historic home located at Lothian in Anne Arundel County, Maryland, United States. It was built in 1860 and is a 2 1/2-story Gothic Revival–style frame dwelling. It consists of a main block with a 2-story rear wing. The main block is three bays wide with a central entrance and features a central cross-gable roof.

It was listed on the National Register of Historic Places in 2009.
