= Birds Mill Swamp =

Birds Mill Swamp is a swamp located just west of the Chesapeake Bay in Anne Arundel County on the Atlantic Coastal Plain region of Maryland in the United States. It lies between Maryland Route 468 (also known as Muddy Creek Road) and Route 2 and is just south of Mill Swamp Road. Its coordinates are 38.88167°N 76.57444°W.

== Ecosystem ==
Like most swamps surrounding the Chesapeake Bay, this small freshwater body is classified as a bald cypress swamp. It is part of a tributary system which feeds into the Rhode River, and ultimately the Chesapeake Bay itself. It is also home to many species including a variety of reptiles, amphibians, insects, birds, and aquatic vegetation. Unlike many swamps, it is untouched by humans except for a few dirt trails nearby. It is an important habitat for wildlife in the area.

Birds Mill Swamp is one of more than one hundred swamps in Maryland.
