= Crime Victims' Rights Act =

Legislation in the United States passed in 2004

The Crime Victims' Rights Act, (CVRA) 18 U.S.C. § 3771, is part of the United States Justice for All Act of 2004, Pub. L. No. 108-405, 118 Stat. 2260 (effective Oct. 30, 2004). The CVRA enumerates the rights afforded to victims in federal criminal cases and victims of offenses committed in the District of Columbia. The Act grants victims the following eight rights:

1. The right to be reasonably protected from the accused.
2. The right to reasonable, accurate, and timely notice of any public court proceeding, or any parole proceeding, involving the crime or of any release or escape of the accused.
3. The right not to be excluded from any such public court proceeding, unless the court, after receiving clear and convincing evidence, determines that testimony by the victim would be materially altered if the victim heard other testimony at that proceeding.
4. The right to be reasonably heard at any public proceeding in the district court involving release, plea, sentencing, or any parole proceeding.
5. The reasonable right to confer with the attorney for the Government in the case.
6. The right to full and timely restitution as provided in law.
7. The right to proceedings free from unreasonable delay.
8. The right to be treated with fairness and with respect for the victim’s dignity and privacy.

The Crime Victims' Rights Act was named for murder victims Scott Campbell, Stephanie Roper, Wendy Preston, Louarna Gillis, and Nila Lynn.

== Judicial interpretation ==
The scope of the Act was tested in litigation arising from the 2007 non-prosecution agreement between federal prosecutors in Florida and Jeffrey Epstein, which was negotiated without notifying his victims. In February 2019, Judge Kenneth Marra of the United States District Court for the Southern District of Florida held that prosecutors had violated the CVRA, writing that "particularly problematic was the government's decision to conceal the existence of the [non-prosecution agreement] and mislead the victims to believe that federal prosecution was still a possibility".

In April 2021, the United States Court of Appeals for the Eleventh Circuit, sitting en banc, denied the mandamus petition brought by one of Epstein's victims. Expressing "the profoundest sympathy" for women who had been "left in the dark and, so it seems, affirmatively misled by government attorneys", the court nonetheless held that subsection (d) of the Act "does not create a private right of action by which a victim can initiate a freestanding lawsuit, wholly unconnected to any preexisting criminal prosecution", and so affords no judicial remedy before formal charges are brought.

Attorneys for the victim released a statement calling the ruling "disturbing", and stated their intent to have the U.S. Supreme Court review the decision, writing "It allows wealthy and powerful defendants (like Epstein) to orchestrate special deals without crime victims having any involvement by negotiating with prosecutors before charges are ever filed."

== See also ==
- Victims' rights
