= Shady Side, Maryland =

- Census-designated place
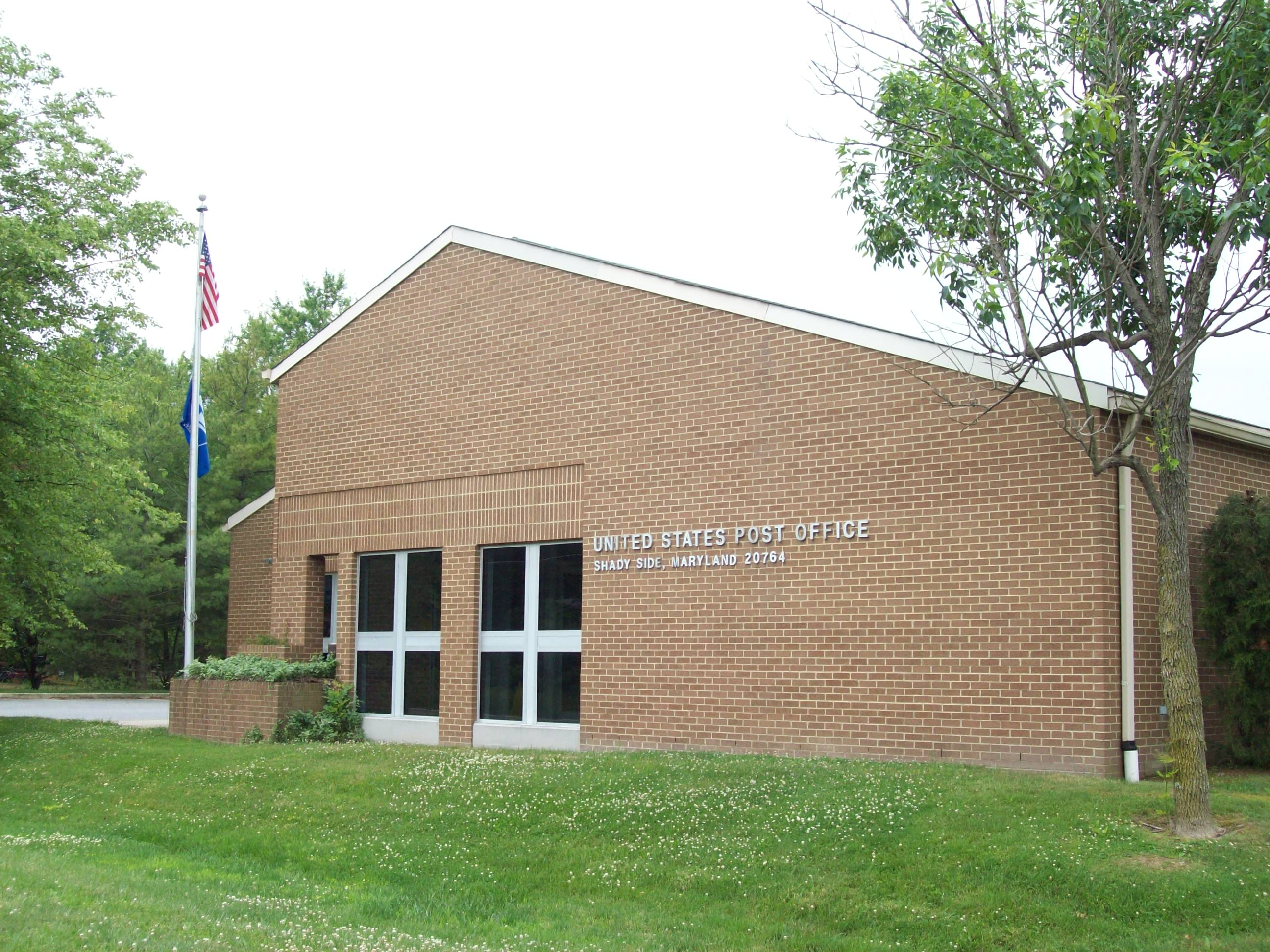
- The U.S. Post Office at Shady Side in May 2010

- Location of Shady Side, Maryland
- Coordinates: 38°50′6″N 76°31′2″W
- Country: United States
- State: Maryland
- County: Anne Arundel

Area
  - Total: 7.86 sq mi (20.35 km^{2})
  - Land: 6.65 sq mi (17.22 km^{2})
  - Water: 1.21 sq mi (3.13 km^{2})
- Elevation: 9 ft (2.7 m)

Population (2020)
  - Total: 5,806
  - Density: 873.0/sq mi (337.08/km^{2})
- Time zone: UTC−5 (Eastern (EST))
  - Summer (DST): UTC−4 (EDT)
- ZIP code: 20764
- Area code: 410
- FIPS code: 24-71450
- GNIS feature ID: 0591259

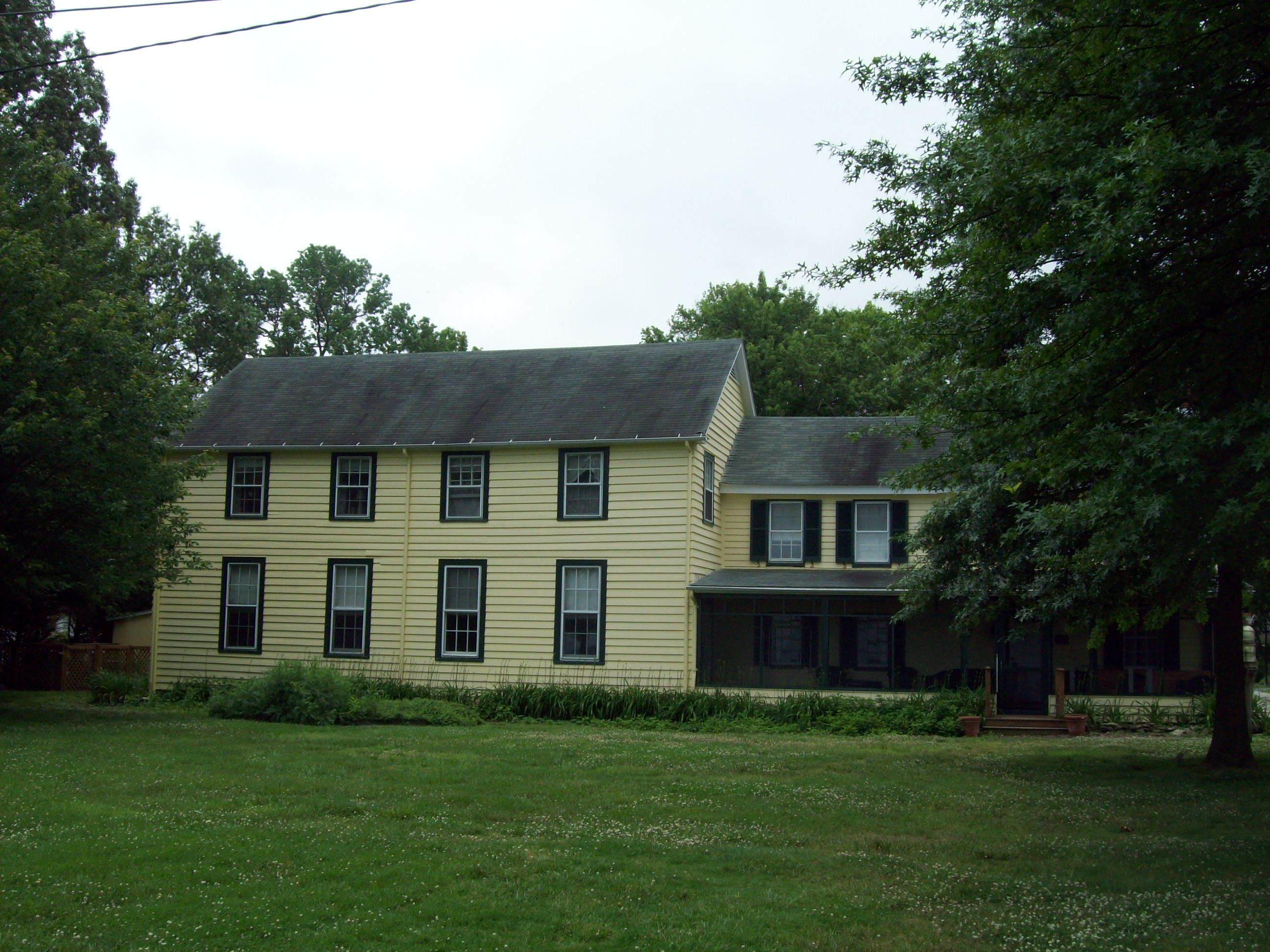
Historic structures in Shady Side, Maryland include the Captain Salem Avery House, which dates to 1860

Shady Side is a census-designated place (CDP) in Anne Arundel County, Maryland, United States. The population was 5,803 at the 2010 census.

== History ==
In the 1790s the area was known as the Great Swamp.

Among the historic structures in Shady Side is the Capt. Salem Avery House. It was listed on the National Register of Historic Places in 2005. The Lula G. Scott Community Center was listed in 2009.

Shady Side was once served by the sidewheel passenger steamer, Emma Giles, that operated from Baltimore, making up to five trips per week.

== Geography ==
Shady Side is located at 38°50′6″N 76°31′2″W (38.834965, −76.517326) in southern Anne Arundel County, on the western shore of the Chesapeake Bay. It is bordered to the north and west by the West River, a wide tidal inlet of the bay. To the south is the CDP of Deale, and to the west, across the West River, is Galesville. The community is served by Maryland Route 468 (Shady Side Road), which runs south, then west, then north, toward the Annapolis area. The center of Annapolis is 20 miles (32 km) north by road and 14 miles (23 km) north by water.

According to the United States Census Bureau, the CDP has a total area of 8.0 square miles (20.7 km^{2}), of which 6.8 square miles (17.5 km^{2}) is land and 1.2 square miles (3.2 km^{2}), or 15.57%, is water.

== Demographics ==
Historical population
Census	Pop.	Note	%±
2010	5,803		—
2020	5,806		0.1%
U.S. Decennial Census

=== 2020 census ===
As of the 2020 census, Shady Side had a population of 5,806 and a population density of 873.1 inhabitants per square mile (337.1/km^{2}). The median age was 44.2 years. 20.0% of residents were under the age of 18 and 17.7% of residents were 65 years of age or older. For every 100 females there were 98.6 males, and for every 100 females age 18 and over there were 96.9 males age 18 and over.

0.0% of residents lived in urban areas, while 100.0% lived in rural areas.

There were 2,309 households in Shady Side, of which 27.7% had children under the age of 18 living in them. Of all households, 54.7% were married-couple households, 16.8% were households with a male householder and no spouse or partner present, and 21.1% were households with a female householder and no spouse or partner present. About 23.9% of all households were made up of individuals and 9.6% had someone living alone who was 65 years of age or older.

There were 2,599 housing units, of which 11.2% were vacant. The homeowner vacancy rate was 1.5% and the rental vacancy rate was 7.7%.

Racial composition as of the 2020 census
Race	Number	Percent
White	4,728	81.4%
Black or African American	528	9.1%
American Indian and Alaska Native	13	0.2%
Asian	42	0.7%
Native Hawaiian and Other Pacific Islander	3	0.1%
Some other race	56	1.0%
Two or more races	436	7.5%
Hispanic or Latino (of any race)	211	3.6%

=== Income and poverty ===
The median income for a household in the CDP was $68,406, and the median income for a family was $70,893. Males had a median income of $43,800 versus $36,431 for females. The per capita income for the CDP was $29,458. About 3.9% of families and 4.5% of the population were below the poverty line, including 3.1% of those under age 18 and 9.1% of those age 65 or over.
