= James Owens Farm =

Historic house in Maryland, United States

- U.S. National Register of Historic Places
- Location within Maryland Location within the United States
- Nearest city: Bristol, Maryland
- Coordinates: 38°48′14″N 76°39′38″W
- Built: 1850
- Architectural style: Greek Revival, Italianate
- NRHP reference No.: 87001566
- Added to NRHP: September 21, 1987

James Owens Farm is a historic home and farm at Bristol, Anne Arundel County, Maryland. The home was built by successful tobacco farmer James Owens and is a large mid-19th century, two-story brick cross-gable late Greek Revival/Italianate dwelling. Outbuildings are all of frame construction and include an early 19th-century cornhouse, an early 19th-century tobacco barn, a mid-19th-century board-and-batten kitchen, carriage house, and smokehouse, and a late 19th-century chicken house.

It was listed on the National Register of Historic Places in 1987.
