= Franklin Manor-on-the-Bay, Maryland =

Unincorporated community in Maryland, United States

- Unincorporated community
- Location within Maryland
- Coordinates: 38.802°N 76.515°W
- Elevation: 0.91 m (3 ft)

Franklin Manor-on-the-Bay is an unincorporated community in Anne Arundel County, Maryland, United States.
