= Captain Avery Museum =

Historic house in Maryland, United States

- U.S. National Register of Historic Places
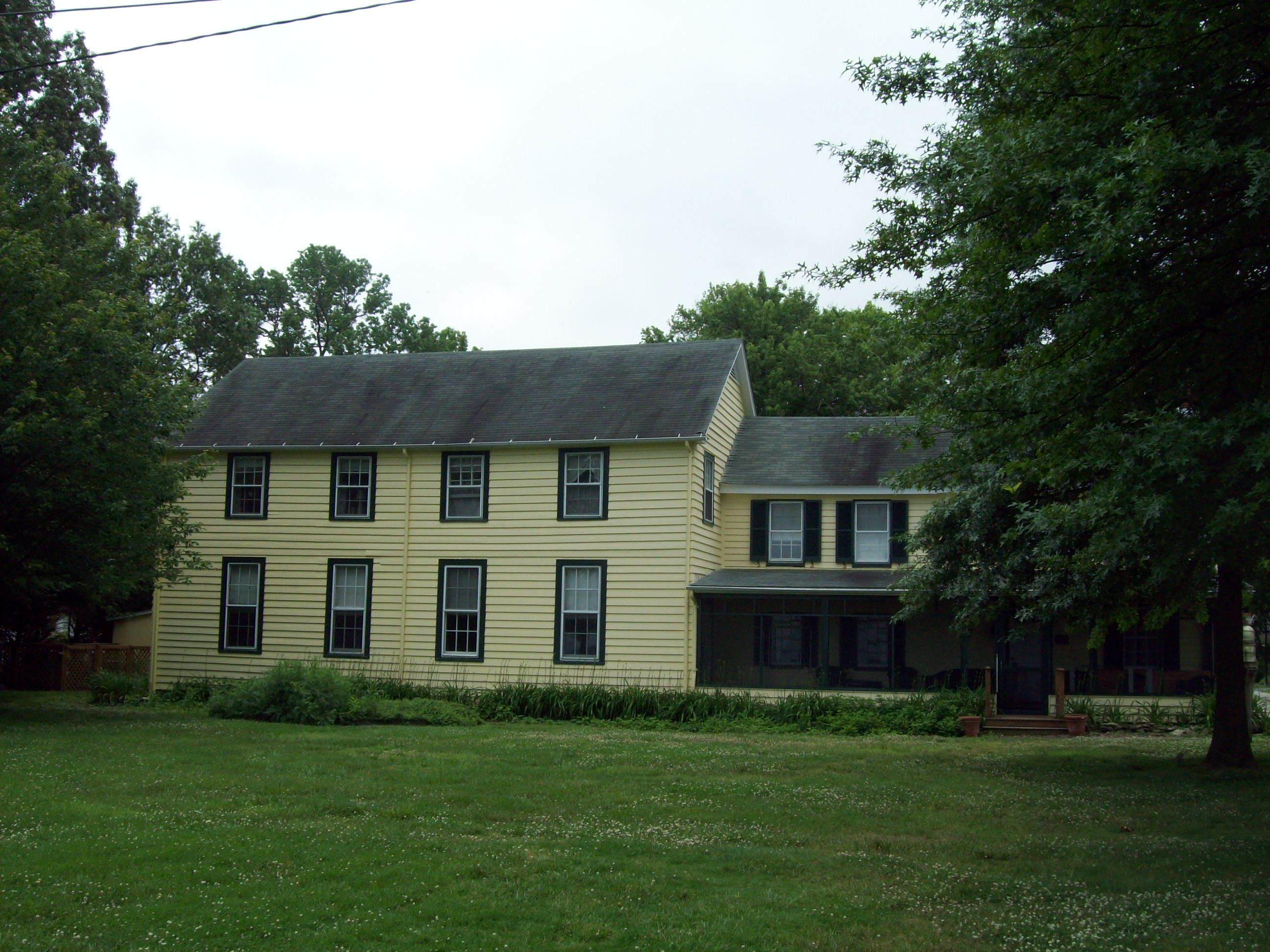
- Captain Avery Museum (formerly called the Capt. Salem Avery House), May 2010

- Location within Maryland Location within the United States
- Location: 1418 East West Shady Side Rd., Shady Side, Maryland
- Coordinates: 38°51′7″N 76°30′43″W
- Built: 1860
- NRHP reference No.: 05001443
- Added to NRHP: December 21, 2005

The Captain Avery Museum is a historic home and museum at Shady Side, Anne Arundel County, Maryland, United States. It is a two-story frame building, located on a 0.75-acre (3,000 m^{2}) rectangular lot. The house overlooks the West River and Chesapeake Bay. The two-story historic structure originally was the residence of the Chesapeake Bay waterman, Capt. Salem Avery, and was constructed about 1860. It was expanded in the nineteenth century and further expanded in the 1920s by the National Masonic Fishing and Country Club. The property consists of the main house with additions, three sheds formerly used as bath houses, and a modern boathouse built in 1993 that features the Edna Florence, a locally-built 1937 Chesapeake Bay deadrise workboat.

It was listed on the National Register of Historic Places in 2005.

The museum, originally called the Captain Salem Avery House Museum, was founded in 1984 by the Shady Side Rural Heritage Society as a local history museum. The names of the Society and the museum were changed in 2015. Currently, the Captain Avery Museum is owned and operated by a nonprofit organization, Captain Avery Museum, Inc.
