= Murder of Stephanie Roper =

1982 murder in Maryland, United States

Stephanie Roper
- Born: 1960
- Disappeared: St. Mary's County, Maryland
- Died: April 3, 1982 (aged 22)
- Cause of death: Murder
- Education: Frostburg State University, Frostburg, Allegany County, Maryland

On April 3, 1982, Stephanie Roper, a 22-year-old Frostburg State University student, was kidnapped, raped repeatedly, tortured, shot, set afire, and partially dismembered, in Prince George's County, Maryland, United States.

== Murder ==
Roper was home on a college break, and she and a girlfriend were returning from an evening with friends at a West End Washington, D.C. bar, the "Twenty-First Amendment" late at night. After dropping her friend off in Brandywine, Maryland, Stephanie proceeded toward her own home in Croom, but her car became disabled on a dark rural road. Two men stopped and kidnapped her at gunpoint. The two men, 26-year-old Jack Ronald Jones and 17-year-old Jerry Lee Beatty, kidnapped Stephanie and took her to an abandoned shack in Oakville, St. Mary's County. There she was tortured and raped repeatedly. One of the men called the other by his first name. Afraid now that Stephanie knew his name, they decided to kill her. Stephanie made several attempts to escape and upon her last capture, her skull was fractured with a logging chain and she was shot to death. In order to hinder identification, the murderers burned her body and severed her hands. They were captured after Beatty bragged about his part in the crime. Both men were charged with kidnapping, rape, and felony murder. Jones was convicted in Baltimore County while Beatty pleaded guilty to the same charges in Anne Arundel County. Both courts imposed sentences of two concurrent life sentences, with parole eligibility after 24 years.

== Family response ==
The Roper family was excluded from observing the trial and was denied the opportunity to present a victim impact statement at sentencing. Stephanie's mother, Roberta Roper, has taken on the cause of victims' rights, including the right of victims' families to address the court before sentencing. She actively lobbies and advocates for rights and support services to crime victims and their survivors. She and her husband, Vincent, formed the Stephanie Roper Committee and Foundation, Inc. and she served as its Executive Director for 20 years. The agency is now known as the Maryland Crime Victims' Resource Center, Inc. (MCVRC). Roberta Roper has dedicated her life to these causes. She serves as the Chair of the MCVRC Board of Directors and co-chairs the National Victims' Constitutional Amendment Network.

== Crime Victims' Rights Act ==
The Crime Victims' Rights Act of 2004 was named, in part, for Stephanie Roper, whose parents were not notified of trial continuances, were excluded from proceedings, and were prevented from giving a victim impact statement. The Act grants victims those and other rights in federal criminal cases.

== Legacy ==
=== Maryland's annual Crime Victims and Advocates Commemorative Day ===
In 2012, the Maryland General Assembly passed House Bill 766 (Chapter 678 of the Laws of Maryland 2012) which requires the Governor annually to proclaim April 3 as Crime Victims and Advocates Commemorative Day to give recognition to the individuals in the State who have become crime victims and to honor the advocates who serve those victims. In addition to issuing the proclamation, the Governor is also required to take appropriate steps to publicize Crime Victims and Advocates Commemorative Day. April 3 was chosen as the date for the commemorative day in memory of Stephanie Roper, who was murdered on that day in 1982 and whose family members established the Maryland Crime Victims' Resource Center, Inc.

=== Stephanie Roper Highway ===
On October 20, 2012, Maryland Governor Martin O'Malley issued a proclamation which named part of Maryland Route 4 (the part of Pennsylvania Avenue just north of Croom, and part of Southern Maryland Boulevard in adjacent Anne Arundel County) in honor of Stephanie Roper and the efforts of her parents Roberta and Vincent Roper.

=== The Stephanie Roper Gallery at Frostburg State University ===
The Stephanie Ann Roper Gallery is located in the Fine Arts Building on the Frostburg State University campus.

=== Roper Victim Assistance Academy ===
The Roper Victim Assistance Academy trains victims' advocates. The Roper Academy was created in 2003 through a grant from the United States Department of Justice, Office for Victims of Crime received by the Maryland Governor's Office of Crime Control and Prevention in partnership with the University of Baltimore.

=== Beatty resentencing ===
In 2021, Maryland banned life without parole for juveniles and allowed them to petition for sentence reductions. As such, Beatty was eligible for a sentence reduction. On February 27, 2026, the court rejected Jerry Beatty’s request for a sentence reduction, confirming that the brutal nature of his crime against 22-year-old college student Stephanie Roper justifies his continued imprisonment.
