= Churchton, Maryland =

Unincorporated community in Maryland, United States

- Unincorporated community
- Location within the state of Maryland Churchton, Maryland (the United States)
- Coordinates: 38°48′09″N 76°32′13″W
- Country: United States
- State: Maryland
- County: Anne Arundel
- Time zone: UTC-5 (Eastern (EST))
  - Summer (DST): UTC-4 (EDT)

Churchton is an unincorporated community in Anne Arundel County, Maryland, United States.

== Natives ==
Los Angeles based film producer Brian Mercer is a native of Churchton.

== Pat's Country Bakery ==
Pat's Country Bakery was open from 1982 until 2002. Head baker Kevin Mercer baked the 75th birthday cake for President Ronald Reagan.
