= Waysons Corner, Maryland =

Unincorporated community in Maryland, United States

- Unincorporated community
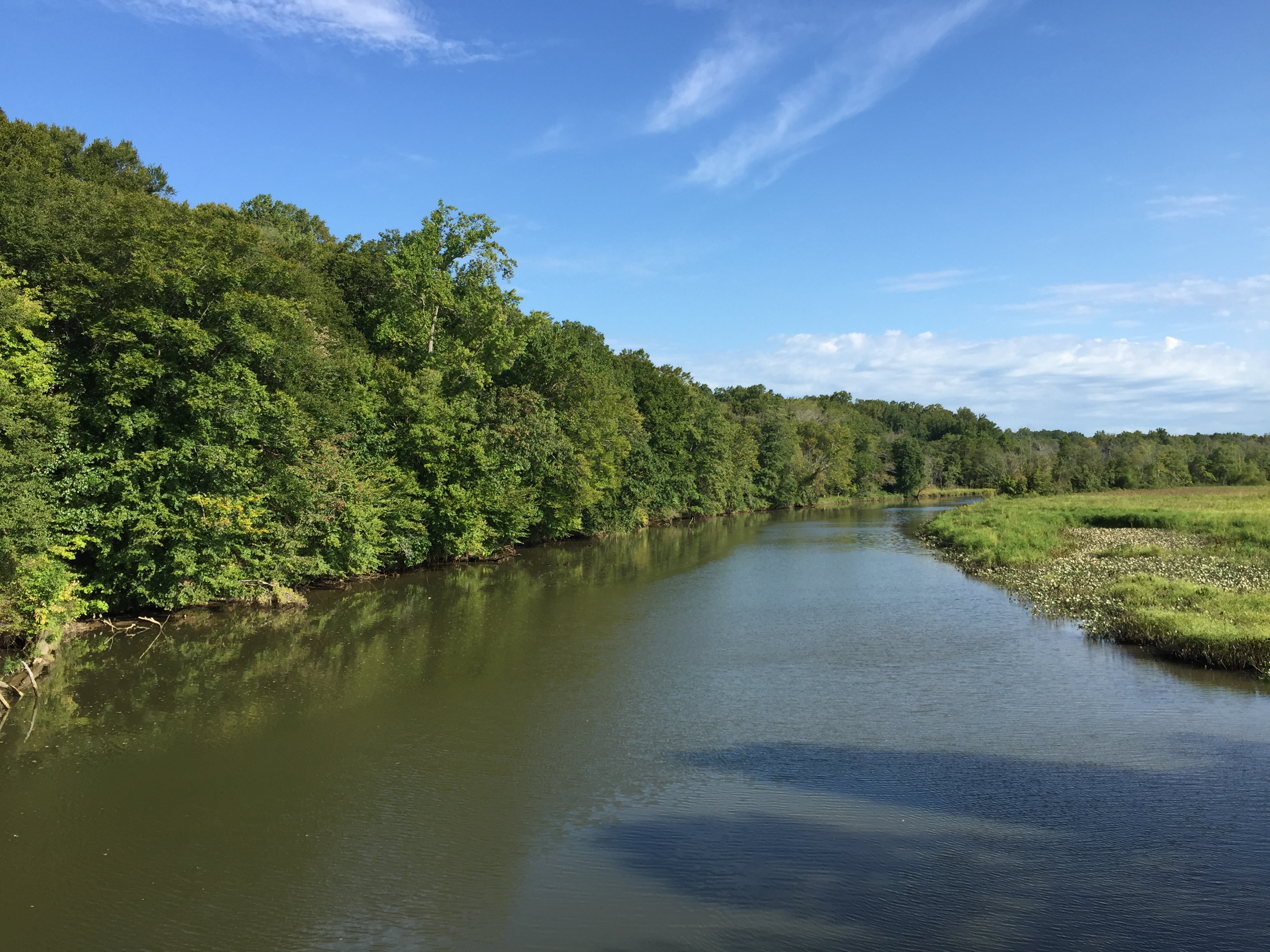
- The Patuxent River flows past Waysons Corner

- Location within Maryland
- Coordinates: 38°48′40″N 76°42′09″W
- Country: United States
- State: Maryland
- County: Anne Arundel
- Elevation: 46 ft (14 m)
- Time zone: UTC-5 (Eastern (EST))
  - Summer (DST): UTC-4 (EDT)
- Area codes: 410 & 443
- GNIS feature ID: 588941

Waysons Corner is an unincorporated community in Anne Arundel County, Maryland, United States, 2.6 miles (4.2 km) east of Upper Marlboro. Waysons Corner is located at the junction of Maryland routes 4 and 408 (Southern Maryland Boulevard), where the former changes names to Pennsylvania Avenue.

== Geography ==
Waysons Corner is five miles west of Lothian but hosts the current "Lothian" post office and is in the current Lothian postal zip code area.

== History ==
In the 1950s, a bingo and slots machine parlor was opened in a warehouse here. When gambling was outlawed in Maryland in the 1960s, the Wayson family kept the bingo business running as Wayson's Bingo in a 750-seat hall. Las Vegas business magnate Steve Wynn, whose resorts on the Las Vegas Strip include The Mirage, Bellagio, Wynn, Treasure Island and Golden Nugget, got his start in gambling by managing the bingo hall here.
