= Lyons Creek (Maryland) =

Stream in Maryland

Coordinates: 38°45′23.2″N 76°40′11.1″W

Lyons Creek is an 11.2-mile-long (18.0 km) tributary of the Patuxent River in Maryland. Lyons Creek serves as the border between southern Anne Arundel County, Maryland and northern Calvert County, Maryland.
