= Bristol, Maryland =

Unincorporated community in Maryland, United States

- Unincorporated community
- Location within the U.S. state of Maryland Bristol, Maryland (the United States)
- Coordinates: 38°47′30″N 76°40′20″W
- Country: United States
- State: Maryland
- County: Anne Arundel
- Time zone: UTC-5 (Eastern (EST))
  - Summer (DST): UTC-4 (EDT)

Bristol is an unincorporated community in Anne Arundel County, Maryland, United States. Jug Bay Wetlands Sanctuary (a stop on the Patuxent Water Trail) and the colonial town of Pig Point (alternately referred to as Bristol Landing and Leon at times) are on the Patuxent River waterfront portion of Bristol. Pig Point saw War of 1812 action and was the county's largest steamboat port on the Patuxent in the mid-19th century. Pig Point is a very significant Native American Early Archaic Period archaeological site.

The Chesapeake Beach Railway was completed in 1899 through the southern part of Bristol or "Pindell"; ruins of the Pindell Station and its general store remain. The James Owens Farm, listed on the National Register of Historic Places, and the southern terminus of the Stephanie Roper Highway portion of Maryland Route 4 are also located in Bristol.

In the mid-twentieth century, the segregated Bristol Elementary School was located in the northern part of town, three-quarter mile southeast of Waysons Corner and a half mile south of the crossroad village of Drury. The school in 1953 published a history of Bristol (largely reprinting a 1927 Bristol town history from the Annapolis Capital newspaper). The following year it was enlarged and renovated, growing to 200 students (and four teachers and a heating and rodent problem) by 1969 after the county was ordered to desegregate schools in 1966.
