= Deale, Maryland =

- Census-designated place
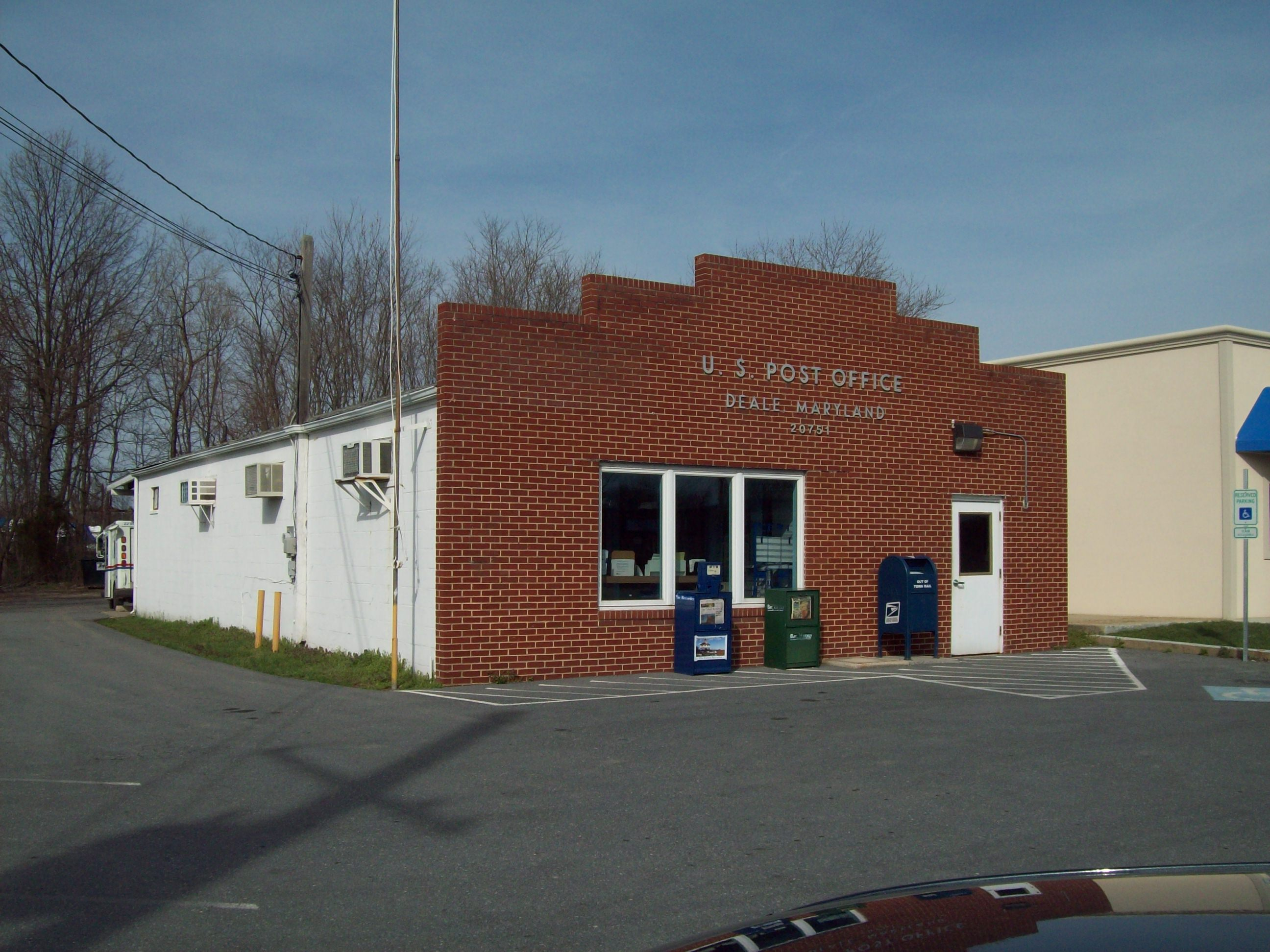
- The U.S. Post Office in Deale, Maryland, in March 2010

- Location of Deale, Maryland
- Coordinates: 38°47′30″N 76°32′20″W
- Country: United States
- State: Maryland
- County: Anne Arundel

Area
  - Total: 5.93 sq mi (15.37 km^{2})
  - Land: 5.31 sq mi (13.75 km^{2})
  - Water: 0.63 sq mi (1.62 km^{2})
- Elevation: 6.6 ft (2 m)

Population (2020)
  - Total: 4,943
  - Density: 931.0/sq mi (359.47/km^{2})
- Time zone: UTC−5 (Eastern (EST))
  - Summer (DST): UTC−4 (EDT)
- ZIP code: 20751
- Area codes: 410, 443, and 667
- FIPS code: 24-22050
- GNIS feature ID: 0590075

Deale is a census-designated place (CDP) in Anne Arundel County, Maryland, United States. The population was 4,945 at the 2010 census. It has a scenic view of the Chesapeake Bay and is popular with boaters. Sudley was listed on the National Register of Historic Places in 1973.

== History ==
Archaeologists have found evidence of nomadic Paleo-Indian tribes in the area dating as far back as 8,000 B.C., with a larger, more permanent campsite in nearby West River dating to 2,000 B.C. Deale was situated in the heart of the hunting territories claimed by the Susquehannock people and within the bounds of the land claimed by the Piscataway people.

European settlers first arrived in Anne Arundel County around 1649 from southeast Virginia during the English Civil War to escape religious persecution. In 1655, they settled Herring Creek, an area that encompasses present-day Deale. They had converted to Quakerism from Puritanism and other Protestant faiths, due to the influence of missionaries that had arrived in the area.

The land was mainly used for farming until around 1870, when watermen from Long Island and Maryland's Eastern Shore settled near Herring Bay's oyster beds. By 1920, some of the farms transitioned into summer communities, and businesses in Deale began building, repairing and renting boats to summer tourists. They also built restaurants and shops to accommodate the visitors. By 1960, some watermen became charter fishing captains offering fishing trips on the Chesapeake to visitors from Baltimore and Washington D.C.

== Geography ==
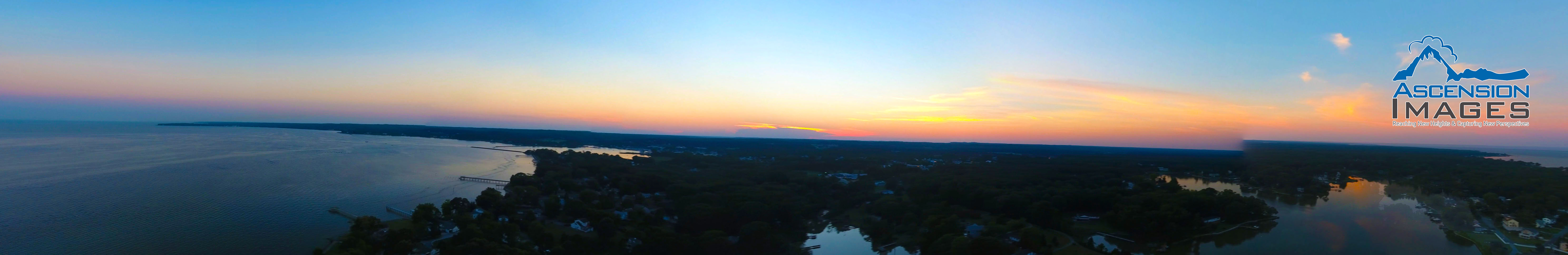
Deale at sunset

Deale is located at 38°47′30″N 76°32′20″W (38.791766, −76.538933).

According to the United States Census Bureau, the CDP has a total area of 5.9 square miles (15.4 km^{2}), of which 5.3 square miles (13.7 km^{2}) is land and 0.66 square miles (1.7 km^{2}), or 11.01%, is water.

Deale is a waterfront fishing village located on the Western Shore of the Chesapeake Bay. Five tidal creeks are located in Deale that flow into the bay: Tracey's Creek, Rockhold Creek, Parker Creek, Carrs Creek, and Broadwater Creek. Rockhold Creek is the most commercial of the creeks and is home to several marinas and most of the charter fishing boats. Happy Harbor Restaurant, one of Deale's most famous landmarks, is located on Rockhold Creek.

== Demographics ==
Historical population
| Census | Pop. | Note | %± |
|---|---|---|---|
| 2010 | 4,945 | | — |
| 2020 | 4,943 | | 0.0% |
U.S. Decennial Census

=== 2020 census ===
As of the 2020 census, Deale had a population of 4,943. The median age was 46.1 years. 19.0% of residents were under the age of 18 and 18.9% of residents were 65 years of age or older. For every 100 females there were 101.1 males, and for every 100 females age 18 and over there were 99.1 males age 18 and over.

0.0% of residents lived in urban areas, while 100.0% lived in rural areas.

There were 2,002 households in Deale, of which 26.5% had children under the age of 18 living in them. Of all households, 54.2% were married-couple households, 17.3% were households with a male householder and no spouse or partner present, and 20.9% were households with a female householder and no spouse or partner present. About 23.7% of all households were made up of individuals and 11.1% had someone living alone who was 65 years of age or older.

There were 2,199 housing units, of which 9.0% were vacant. The homeowner vacancy rate was 1.2% and the rental vacancy rate was 6.8%.

Racial composition as of the 2020 census
| Race | Number | Percent |
|---|---|---|
| White | 4,225 | 85.5% |
| Black or African American | 290 | 5.9% |
| American Indian and Alaska Native | 15 | 0.3% |
| Asian | 38 | 0.8% |
| Native Hawaiian and Other Pacific Islander | 0 | 0.0% |
| Some other race | 54 | 1.1% |
| Two or more races | 321 | 6.5% |
| Hispanic or Latino (of any race) | 207 | 4.2% |

=== 2010 census ===
As of the census of 2010, there were 4,945 people, 1,778 households, and 1,313 families residing in the CDP. The population density was 1,105.0 inhabitants per square mile (426.6/km^{2}). There were 1,942 housing units at an average density of 447.4 per square mile (172.7/km^{2}). The racial makeup of the CDP was 91.89% White, 6.01% African American, 0.10% Native American, 0.44% Asian, 0.06% Pacific Islander, 0.15% from other races, and 1.36% from two or more races. Hispanic or Latino of any race were 1.06% of the population.

There were 1,778 households, out of which 35.6% had children under the age of 18 living with them, 59.4% were married couples living together, 10.5% had a female householder with no husband present, and 26.1% were non-families. 19.7% of all households were made up of individuals, and 7.2% had someone living alone who was 65 years of age or older. The average household size was 2.70 and the average family size was 3.11.

In the CDP, the population was spread out, with 26.4% under the age of 18, 6.1% from 18 to 24, 32.7% from 25 to 44, 25.5% from 45 to 64, and 9.3% who were 65 years of age or older. The median age was 38 years. For every 100 females, there were 98.8 males. For every 100 females age 18 and over, there were 97.3 males.

The median income for a household in the CDP was $66,016, and the median income for a family was $73,708. Males had a median income of $41,219 versus $32,708 for females. The per capita income for the CDP was $26,214. About 1.9% of families and 3.7% of the population were below the poverty line, including 4.6% of those under age 18 and 2.7% of those age 65 or over.

== Economy ==
Deale is a bedroom community for workers commuting to Washington, DC, and Annapolis. The largest industries are public administration, professional, scientific, & technical services, and construction.

The community also has a thriving tourism sector due to its location on the Chesapeake Bay and heritage as a fishing village. It features a variety of charter boating, water sports and waterfront restaurants and bars. It is also home to a number of marina resorts, including the award-winning Herrington Harbor.

== Government and Infrastructure ==
Deale is served by the Anne Arundel County Police Southern District station in Edgewater. The Deale Volunteer Fire Department, organized in 1946, serves the community and has a variety of fundraising and civic engagement events every year. Deale falls within the Anne Arundel County Public School District, and is served by Southern High School, which holds both National and Maryland Blue Ribbon awards.

== Media ==
Deale was home to WRYR-LP, a low power community radio station owned and operated by the South Arundel Citizens for Responsible Development (SACReD). The station was built by numerous volunteers from Deale and around the region in February 2002 at the first Prometheus Radio Project barnraising. WRYR-LP broadcast music, news, and public affairs to listeners at 97.5FM, until the station's license was cancelled by the Federal Communications Commission on October 2, 2019.

== Notable people ==
John and T.J. Osborne, who comprise the country duo Brothers Osborne, are natives of Deale.
