= Lothian, Maryland =

Unincorporated community in Maryland, United States

- Unincorporated community
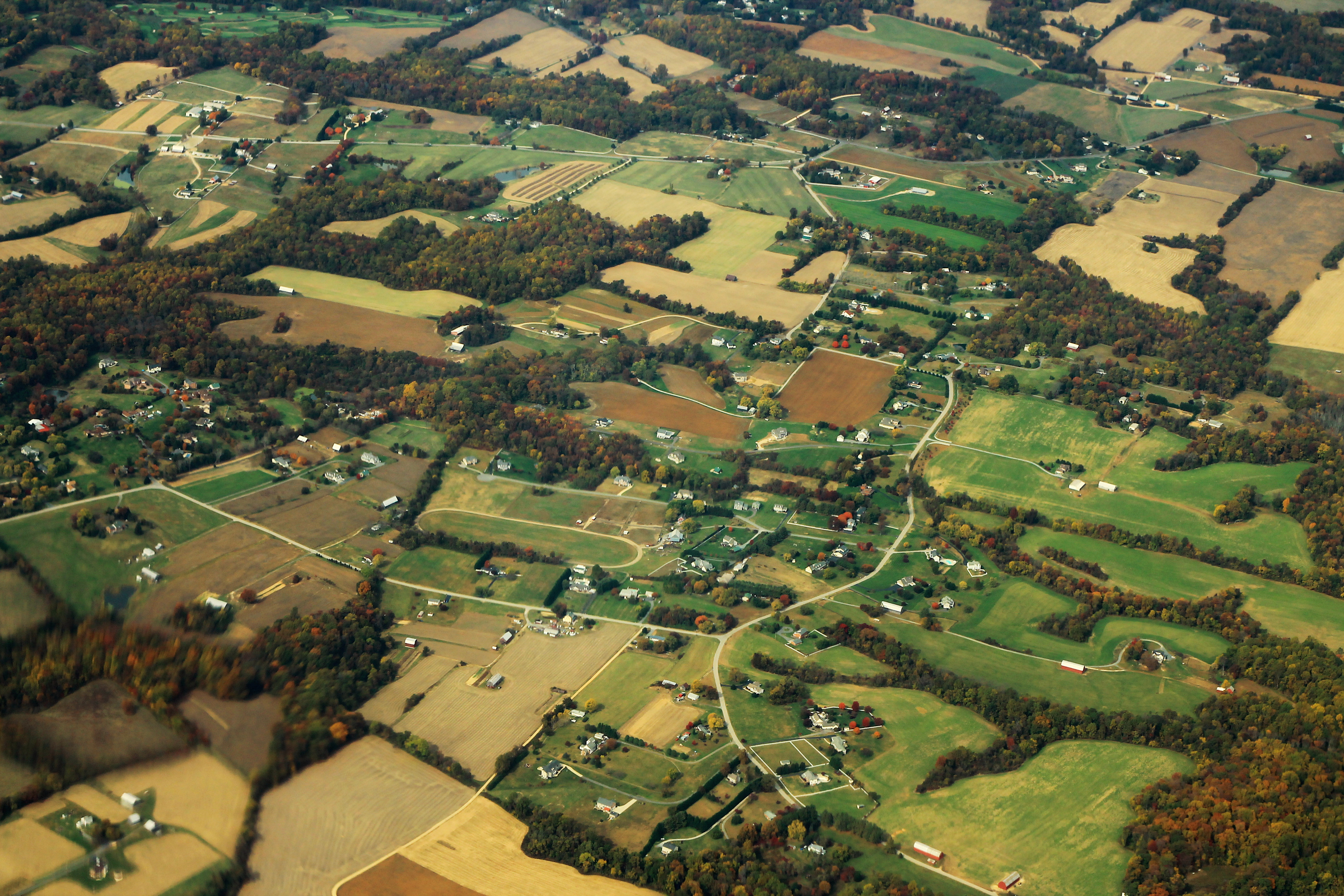
- Aerial view of some housing and farmland

- Location within the state of Maryland Lothian, Maryland (the United States)
- Coordinates: 38°49′54″N 76°36′41″W
- Country: United States
- State: Maryland
- County: Anne Arundel
- Time zone: UTC-5 (Eastern (EST))
  - Summer (DST): UTC-4 (EDT)
- ZIP code: 20711

Lothian is an unincorporated community in Anne Arundel County, Maryland, United States. 12 miles southwest of Annapolis, 24 miles east of Washington and 31 miles south of Baltimore. As of the 2010 Census, the population was 6,643 people.

Public Schools: Lothian Elementary, Southern Middle, and Southern Senior.

Members of Congress: U.S. Senators Chris Van Hollen and Angela Alsobrooks; U.S. Representative Steny Hoyer (D-Md.-5th District).

State Representatives: State Representative Robert A. Costa (Maryland House of Delegates District 33B) (see Map of District 33B); Md State Senator Edward R. Reilly.
