= Larkin's Hundred =

Historic house in Maryland, United States

- U.S. National Register of Historic Places
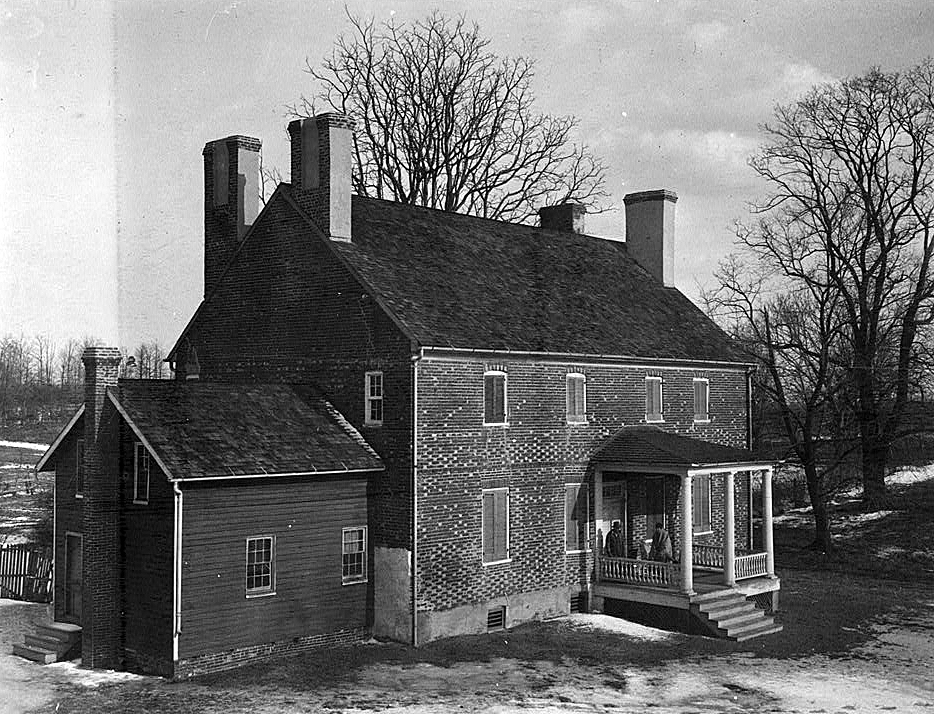
- Larkin's Hundred in the early 20th century

- Location within Maryland Location within the United States
- Nearest city: Harwood, Maryland
- Coordinates: 38°53′19″N 76°34′57″W
- Built: 1704
- Architectural style: Colonial, Georgian
- NRHP reference No.: 69000063
- Added to NRHP: May 15, 1969

Larkin's Hundred, also known as The Castle, is a historic home at Harwood, Anne Arundel County, Maryland, United States. It is a two-story brick house. Although tradition holds that it was built in 1704 by Thomas Larkin, a son of John Larkin of nearby Larkin's Hill Farm, evidence suggest it was actually constructed in the second quarter of the 18th century for Captain Joseph Cowman, a mariner and wealthy Quaker. A white clapboard kitchen wing at the west end was added in 1870. A noteworthy interior feature is a graceful stairway of American walnut.

Larkin's Hundred was listed on the National Register of Historic Places in 1969.
