= South River Club =

- U.S. National Register of Historic Places
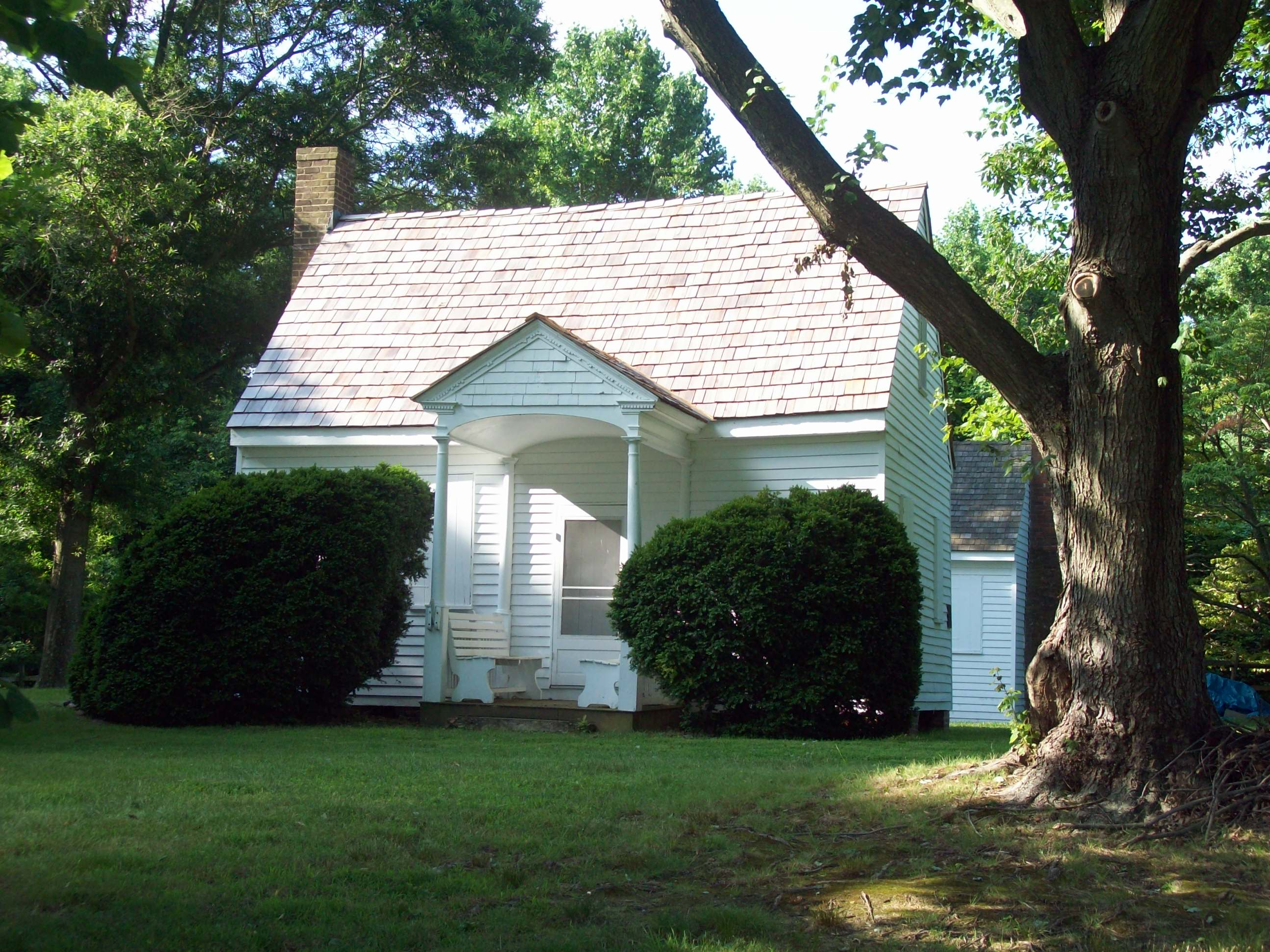
- South River Club, July 2009

- Location within Maryland Location within the United States
- Nearest city: South River, Maryland
- Coordinates: 38°54′21″N 76°33′51″W
- Area: 0 acres (0 ha)
- Built: 1742
- NRHP reference No.: 69000067
- Added to NRHP: May 15, 1969

The South River Club is a social club located just south of Annapolis in Anne Arundel County, Maryland. The name also refers to the group's clubhouse, which was built in 1742.

== The club ==
The South River Club (also known as "The Old South River Club") is one of the country's oldest, continuously active organizations of its type. Early records were lost when the first clubhouse burned down, but there is evidence that the club existed in 1732 and perhaps as early as 1700. Club records show that it existed before February 11, 1742, when a resolution was passed to attempt to record all previous members' names. As early as 1746, the club was referred to as "The Ancient South River Club" in the Maryland Gazette.

Early members included prominent landowners, merchants, and the local doctor and clergyman, all of whom lived within a 10-mile radius of the clubhouse.

The members of the club meet at the clubhouse four times per year for feasts prepared in the detached kitchen. Women are only allowed in the clubhouse on "Pilgrimage Days."

== The clubhouse ==
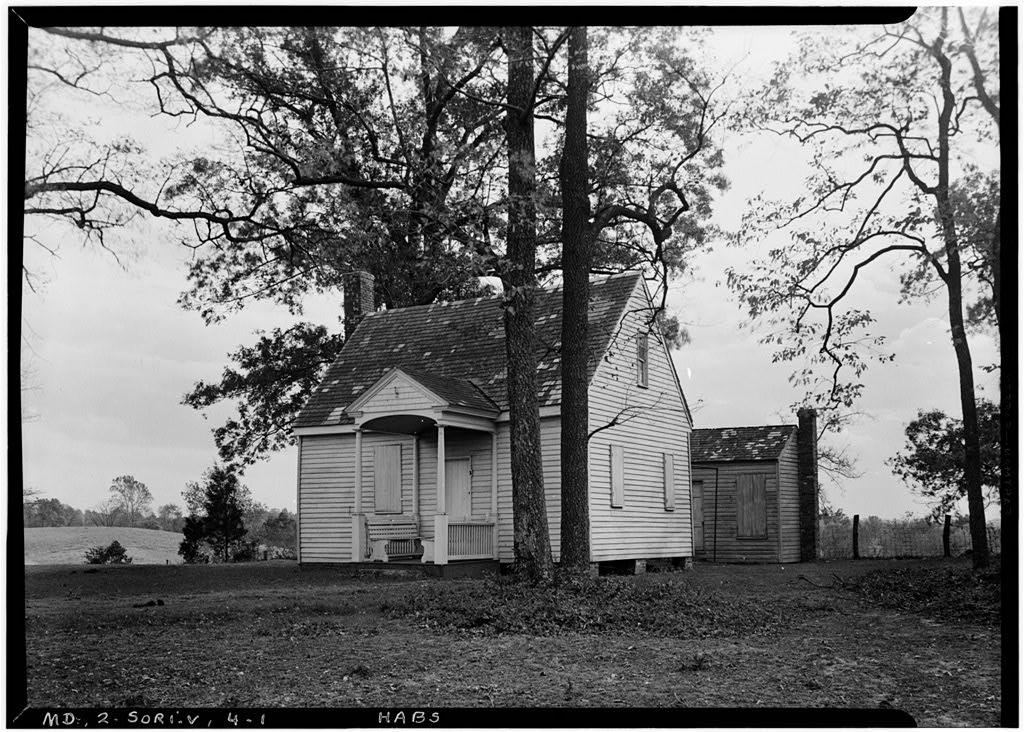
South River Club, November 1936

It is not clear where the first clubhouse stood. There is speculation that it was in Londontowne, Maryland.

The present structure was built in 1742 on land purchased from Captain Thomas Gassaway, son of Colonel Nicholas Gassaway. It is a small frame, 1 1/2-story one-room clubhouse with a gable roof and a narrow exterior chimney on the east gable end. It was listed on the National Register of Historic Places in 1969.

== Members ==
- Joseph Noble Stockett

== See also ==
- List of traditional gentlemen's clubs in the United States
