= Chestnut Hill Cove, Maryland =

Unincorporated community in Maryland, United States

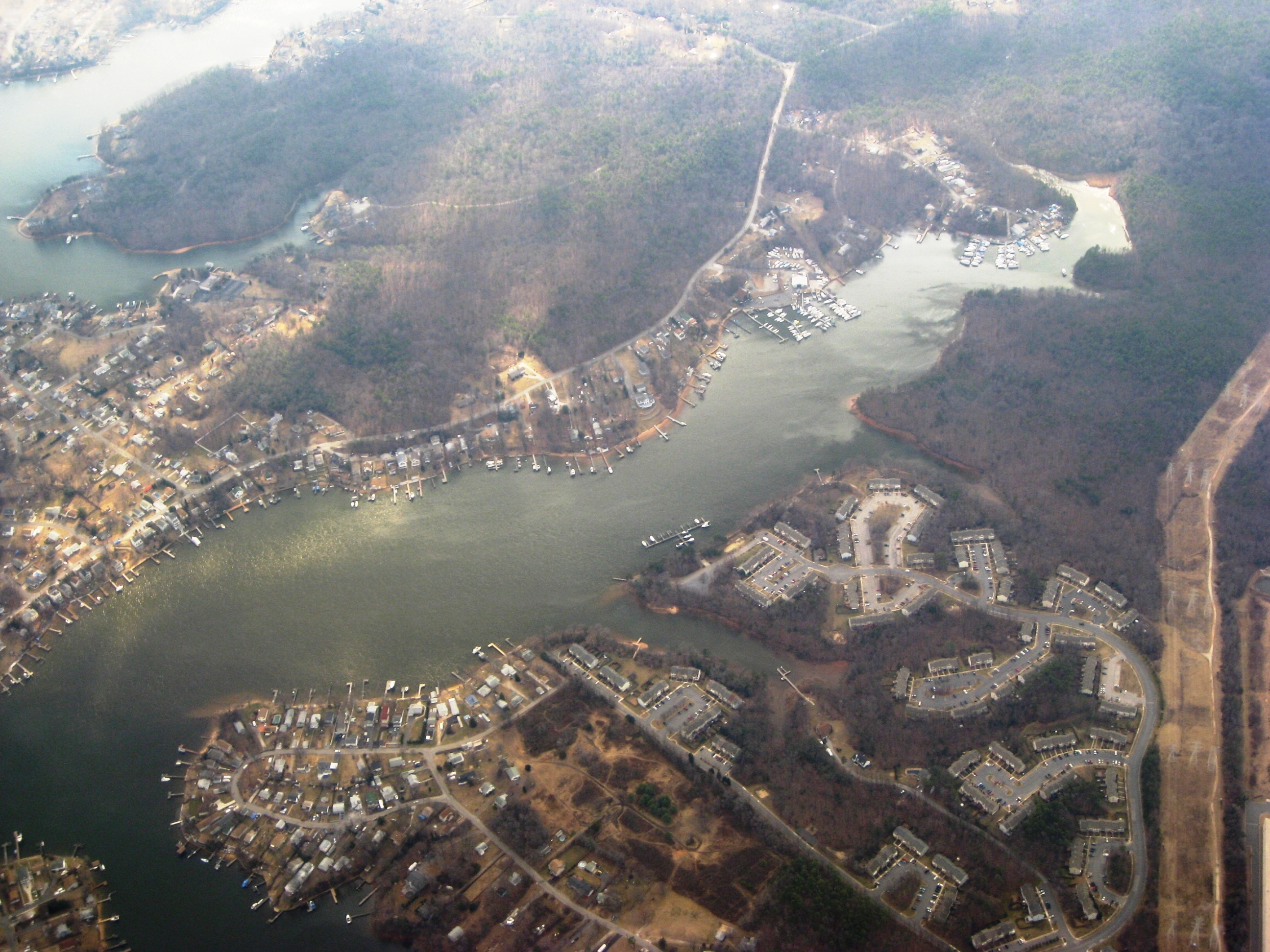
- Aerial image of Chestnut Hill Cove (Apartment complex on the bottom right)
- Interactive map of Chestnut Hill Cove, Maryland
- Coordinates: 39°10′12″N 76°32′30″W
- Country: United States
- State: Maryland
- County: Anne Arundel
- Time zone: UTC-5 (EST)
  - Summer (DST): UTC-4 (EDT)
- Zip Code: 21226
- Area codes: 410, 443
- FIPS code: 24-60475
- GNIS feature ID: 0590983

Chestnut Hill Cove is an unincorporated community in Anne Arundel County, Maryland, United States.

Designated as a "city" by the United States Postal Service, Chestnut Hill Cove is a waterfront community situated on 100 acres of land, in the Chesapeake Bay Watershed, containing 394 town homes. Located on Nabbs Creek in Chestnut Hill Cove Maryland, minutes from the Inner Harbor in Baltimore, the community offers a 30 slip marina, boat ramp facility, and a storage area. Development features in this community include extensive tree save areas and pioneering environmentally sensitive storm water management areas.

== Geography ==
Chestnut Hill Cove is located at 39°10′12″N 76°32′30″W (39.112809, -76.551871).

Chestnut Hill Cove is situated on 100 acres of land located on Fort Smallwood Road near the Chesapeake Bay. It is partially bordered by tidal inlets to the bay, notably Nabbs Creek to the east and south. It is bordered by Pasadena to the east, with the boundary in the vicinity of Solley Road, to the west. It is also bordered on the west by a 97-acre easement that is handled by the North County Land Trust which is located along Nabbs Creek. Chestnut Cove Drive is the main route through the community, running generally north to south. Other streets include Chestnut Woods Court, Chestnut Haven Court, Arborwood Place, Veranda Court, Swanhill Court, Hollow Glen Court, Tillerman Place, Double Chestnut Court, Chestnut Moss Court, Chestnut Manor Court, Chestnut View Court, Chestnut Brook Court, Springhouse Lane, Timerfield Court, and Gardenview Court.

== Notable natives and residents ==
- William Donald Schaefer - Mayor, Governor, and Comptroller

== Schools and Education ==
=== Public Schools ===
- Northeast High School
- Northeast Middle School
- Solley Elementary School

=== Parochial Schools ===
- Saint Jane Frances

=== Private Schools ===
- Calvary Baptist Church Academy
- Magothy Cooperative Preschool
- St. Jane Frances De Chantel

=== Colleges ===
- Anne Arundel Community College

== Sports Organizations ==
=== Baseball ===
- Lake Shore Youth Baseball
- Elvaton Park

=== Football ===
- Pasadena Chargers
- Rivera Beach Buccaneers
- Panthers Athletic Club

=== Soccer ===
- Mountain Road Soccer
- Pasadena Soccer Club
- Elvaton Park

=== Softball ===
- Green Haven Softball Assn.
- Havenwood Girls Softball

https://www.leaguelineup.com/welcome.asp?url=havenwoodgirlssoftball

Lake Shore Lightning Girls Softball

=== Basketball ===
- Riviera Beach Buccaneers
- Lake Shore Youth Basketball

=== Lacrosse ===
- Rivera Beach Buccaneers
- Youth Lacrosse Association

=== Swimming Pools ===
- North Arundel Aquatic Center
- Arundel Olympic Swim Center
- The Y in Pasadena (formerly Big Vanilla)
- Pleasure Cove Marina & Club

== Libraries ==
- Mountain Road Public Library
- North County Public Library
- Rivera Beach Public Library

== Churches ==
- Community United Methodist Church
- Emmanuel Lutheran Church
- Lake Shore Baptist Church
- Magothy United Methodist Church
- Solley United Methodist Church
- St. Jane Frances Church
- Pasadena United Methodist Church
