= Green Haven =

Green Haven may refer to:

Places in the United States:

- Green Haven, Maryland
- Green Haven, Michigan
- Green Haven Correctional Facility, a maximum security prison in New York
