= Governor's Bridge (Patuxent River) =

Bridge in Maryland, United States

Governor Bridge
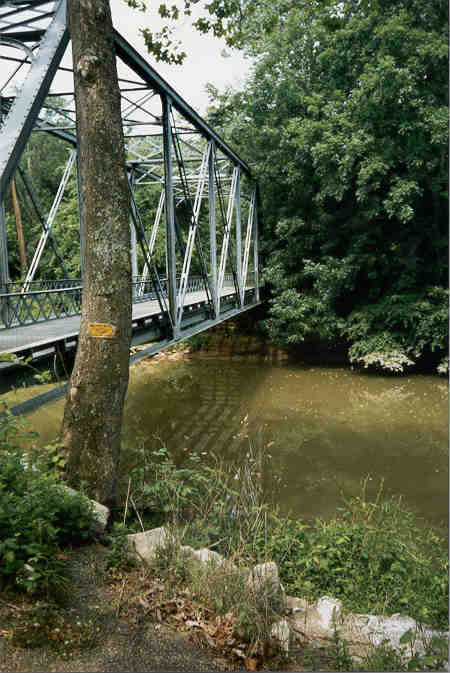
- Governor Bridge
- Coordinates: 38°57′05″N 76°41′36″W
- Carries: Governor Bridge Road
- Crosses: Patuxent River
- Owner: State Roads Commission
- Heritage status: Historic American Engineering Record, Maryland Historical Trust

Characteristics
- Design: Pratt truss
- Material: Steel
- Total length: 105 feet 6 inches (32.16 m)
- Width: 13 feet 7 inches (4.14 m)

History
- Constructed by: unknown

Location
- Interactive map of Governor Bridge

Governor Bridge is a historic single-lane bridge over the Patuxent River near Bowie, Maryland. The river marks the boundary between Prince George's and Anne Arundel counties. A bridge has been located on this site since the mid-18th century.

Although a common bridge type, the current Governor Bridge is one of only two surviving truss bridges in Prince George's County.

== History ==
Three bridges have stood on this site.

The first bridge was constructed by Governor Samuel Ogle to travel between his mansion in Collington and the state capital in Annapolis.

By 1817, the first bridge had been damaged beyond repair or destroyed, and a ford was being used to traverse the river at the site. On February 4, 1817, the State of Maryland commissioned Joseph N. Stockett and James Sanders of Anne Arundel County to build a new Governor's Bridge.

== Current bridge ==
The current truss bridge was constructed in 1912.

After an inspection on May 6, 2013, the County determined the bridge was structurally deficient and in need of major repairs. The bridge was closed, and on October 21, the County agreed to conduct repairs and construction activities on the bridge, which started on January 6, 2014, and re-opened on March 7, 2014.

The bridge closed March 30, 2015, after contractors inspected the bridge and determined it required emergency repairs. In October 2018, the county held a public meeting to describe six different proposals for repairing or replacing the bridge. In September 2019, the county held a public meeting to review feedback on the alternatives. It planned to repair and re-open the bridge, but it has yet to happen as of May 2026.

== See also ==
- List of bridges documented by the Historic American Engineering Record in Maryland
