= Anniversary Day =

Anniversary Day may refer to:

- Anniversary Day, one of the historical forerunners to Australia Day
- Anniversary Day, a public holiday in Tristan da Cunha
- Brooklyn–Queens Day, formerly Anniversary Day
- Provincial Anniversary Day in each province of New Zealand

== See also ==
- Anniversary (disambiguation)
- Anniversary Days Observance Act 1859, an Act of the Parliament of the United Kingdom
- Wedding anniversary
