= Etowah (Anne Arundel County, Maryland) =

Historic house in Maryland, United States

- U.S. National Register of Historic Places
- Location within Maryland Location within the United States
- Location: 4056 Solomons Island Road (MD 2), Harwood, Maryland
- Coordinates: 38°53′00″N 76°36′18″W
- Built: ca. 1820-1830, ca. 1949
- Built by: Archibald Coleman Rogers
- Architectural style: Colonial Revival
- NRHP reference No.: 100008494
- Added to NRHP: December 19, 2022

Etowah is a historic home located at Harwood, Anne Arundel County, Maryland. The original structure was built between 1820 and 1830, and is a two-story, three bay wide, brick structure. A Colonial Revival-style frame wing, designed by architect Archibald Coleman Rogers, was added about 1949.

It was listed on the National Register of Historic Places in 2022.
