= Hillsmere Shores, Maryland =

Unincorporated community in Maryland, United States

- Former census-designated place
- Location of Hillsmere Shores, Maryland
- Coordinates: 38°56′9″N 76°29′44″W
- Country: United States
- State: Maryland
- County: Anne Arundel

Area
  - Total: 2.0 sq mi (5.3 km^{2})
  - Land: 1.4 sq mi (3.6 km^{2})
  - Water: 0.66 sq mi (1.7 km^{2})
- Elevation: 20 ft (6 m)

Population (2000)
  - Total: 2,977
  - Density: 2,140/sq mi (827/km^{2})
- Time zone: UTC−5 (Eastern (EST))
  - Summer (DST): UTC−4 (EDT)
- FIPS code: 24-39300
- GNIS feature ID: 0590478

Hillsmere Shores was a census-designated place (CDP) in Anne Arundel County, Maryland, United States. It is a suburb of Annapolis. The population was 2,977 at the 2000 census. It was included in the Annapolis Neck CDP at the 2010 census. Built in phases, beginning in 1960, the community has been home to The Key School, a non-sectarian private school, since the 1960s.

== Geography ==
Hillsmere Shores is located at 38°56′9″N 76°29′44″W (38.935813, −76.495668).

According to the United States Census Bureau, the CDP had a total area of 2.0 square miles (5.2 km^{2}), of which 1.4 square miles (3.6 km^{2}) is land and 0.6 square miles (1.6 km^{2}) (31.53%) is water. The community's elevation is approximately 40 feet (12 m) above sea level.

== Demographics ==
As of the census of 2000, there were 2,977 people, 1,107 households, and 867 families residing in the CDP. The population density was 2,141.8 inhabitants per square mile (827.0/km^{2}). There were 1,140 housing units at an average density of 820.2 per square mile (316.7/km^{2}). The racial makeup of the CDP was 94.02% White, 1.98% African American, 0.07% Native American, 1.55% Asian, 0.64% from other races, and 1.75% from two or more races. Hispanic or Latino of any race were 1.65% of the population.

There were 1,107 households, out of which 31.6% had children under the age of 18 living with them, 65.9% were married couples living together, 9.4% had a female householder with no husband present, and 21.6% were non-families. 15.0% of all households were made up of individuals, and 4.5% had someone living alone who was 65 years of age or older. The average household size was 2.64 and the average family size was 2.92.

In the CDP, the population was spread out, with 23.0% under the age of 18, 4.6% from 18 to 24, 27.4% from 25 to 44, 32.1% from 45 to 64, and 12.9% who were 65 years of age or older. The median age was 42 years. For every 100 females, there were 98.7 males. For every 100 females age 18 and over, there were 95.1 males.

The median income for a household in the CDP was $72,035, and the median income for a family was $72,685. Males had a median income of $57,039 versus $35,000 for females. The per capita income for the CDP was $35,352. About 2.4% of families and 4.5% of the population were below the poverty line, including 7.6% of those under age 18 and 1.6% of those age 65 or over.
