= Obligation (Harwood, Maryland) =

Historic house in Maryland, United States

- U.S. National Register of Historic Places
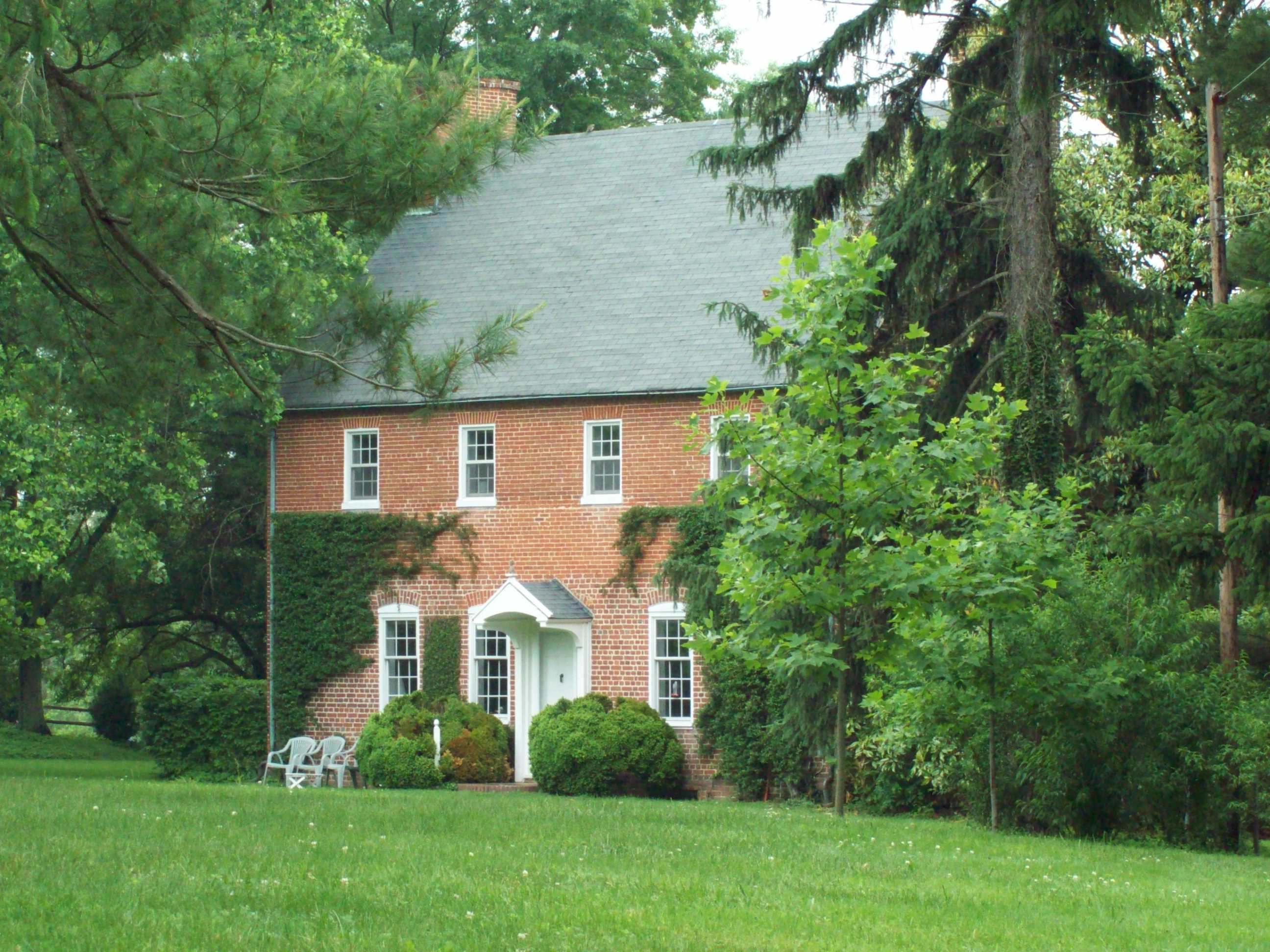
- Obligation, May 2010

- Location within Maryland Location within the United States
- Nearest city: Harwood, Maryland
- Coordinates: 38°53′27″N 76°36′17″W
- Built: 1743
- NRHP reference No.: 69000065
- Added to NRHP: May 15, 1969

Obligation is a historic home at Harwood, Anne Arundel County, Maryland, United States. It was begun in 1743 and later enlarged in 1827, to two and one-half stories. The house was built for Thomas Stockett III, and was enlarged to its present configuration during the ownership of his grandson, Joseph Noble Stockett (1779-1858). Dr. Thomas Noble Stockett (1747-1802) was the son of Thomas III, and became a prominent citizen and served as a surgeon for the Maryland Line during the American Revolutionary War.

Obligation was listed on the National Register of Historic Places in 1969.
