= LeRoy Battle =

American jazz musician and Tuskegee Airman (1921–2015)

- Born: December 31, 1921; New York City, New York, U.S.
- Died: September 28, 2015 (aged 93); Annapolis, Maryland, U.S.
- Military career
- Allegiance: United States of America
- Branch: United States Army Air Corps
- Service years: 1945–1947
- Unit: Tuskegee Airmen
- Awards: Congressional Gold Medal

LeRoy Battle (December 31, 1921 – March 28, 2015) was a World War II pilot, teacher, and jazz musician. He was a Tuskegee Airman and one of the African American officers involved in the Freeman Field Mutiny.

== Early life ==
=== Family ===
Battle was born in Harlem to Walter Battle and Margie Goldwire Battle(later Margie Battle-Smith). His father owned a candy store, and his mother worked as a cook and beautician. Both Walter and Margie Battle's families had moved to New York from the rural South as part of the Great Migration.

Battle wrote in his autobiography that while his uncles played a major role in his childhood, he did not spend much time with his father. The summer after Battle completed fifth grade, his parents separated. Battle and his mother moved in with his aunt and grandparents, who lived on Fulton Street in Brooklyn.

Battle's aunt and mother ran beauty salons, where he often did odd jobs. He remembered that "The Depression seems not to have too big an impact on our lives as far as I can tell."

=== Music lessons ===
It was in Brooklyn that Battle became interested in drumming. In order to take music lessons, he joined a Boy Scout troop run through the Bethany Baptist Church. Battle recalled that while the equipment was poor, the scoutmaster, Gary Talbert, was a "very kind and caring" man who became a father figure to him. Talbert arranged for the boys to take further lessons at the Harlem YMCA. After six months of training, Battle's scout troop officially formed a drum and bugle corps. During his time in the band, Battle took part in five Anniversary Day parades.

In seventh grade, Battle got his own drum set from the Wurlitzer's Music Company, where he arranged to take lessons for 25 cents apiece. After his mother recommended him to an affluent family in Bensonhurst, Battle became a music instructor himself, for the "exorbitant fee" of seven dollars a lesson.

=== Early experiences with racism ===
Battle vividly recalled an incident where he and his friends were refused service by an ice cream parlor because of their race. For the next week, they returned to the parlor every night to yell insults at the owner until he chased them away with a baseball bat. "Even to this day when I think back on that night," Battle wrote decades later, "I can still hear the brittle sound of crashing glasses, all because they had been touched by black boys."

=== Musical career in high school ===
Battle attended Alexander Hamilton High School in Crown Heights, where he played drums in the school orchestra and marching band. He also performed in the Al Bounds Orchestra, the Harold Cabbell Orchestra, and New York's All-City Orchestra. On one occasion, his reputation as a musician saved him from being beaten up by a gang.

As a senior in high school, Battle played alongside Billie Holiday at the Three Deuces Jazz Club. Soon afterwards, he joined a traveling show that took him across the Southern United States. Due to the Jim Crow laws, Battle and the group usually had to sleep and eat on the bus.

== World War II ==
=== Military training ===
Battle was drafted in September 1943. On his first day in the military, Battle volunteered to join the Tuskegee Airmen. "I can't say that I ever had any previous aspirations to be a pilot," he later explained, "but it sounded like a much better opportunity than anything else that was likely to come along." Battle went through basic training at Keesler Field and continued on to the Tuskegee Institute.

After graduating from Tuskegee, Battle took a six-week gunnery program at Tyndall Field, where he learned to shoot down attacking planes. He and another black cadet played music at a dance for white cadets, in exchange for extra free time for the rest of the black trainees. At the dance, Battle was offended to find that he and his companion were hidden from sight behind a wall of palm trees. When asked to play again, he refused.

Battle graduated bombardier training at the Midland Air Force Base on November 4, 1944. He was assigned to the 616th Squadron of the 477th Bombardment Group.

=== Freeman Field mutiny ===
In 1945, the 477th Bombardment Group was transferred to the Freeman Army Air Force Base for advanced training, after which they were to be sent overseas. When the soldiers of the 477th discovered that they would not be allowed to use the Freeman officers' club because of their race, they decided to protest. Battle was one of the first twenty black pilots who tried to enter the club. All twenty men were placed under arrest. Battle recalled of the incident:

We went to the theater, then a bunch of us went over to the club. We brushed by [the MPs], went in and sat down. Col. Selway … put us under barrack arrest. They had a barbed-wire fence around our area. We could look out and see the Italian POWs walking around, going to the PX. We would meet in the lavatory.

— LeRoy Battle

The 'mutineers' were told to sign an affidavit apologizing for their actions and promising not to enter the club again. Battle and the other nineteen refused, despite the threat of court-martial. In his autobiography, he explained his reasoning:

We were very cognizant of the fact that, theoretically, because this was during wartime, we could be brought up on charges of treason, or mutiny, and consequently executed. There was a very real danger that this could happen. The idea of people taking aggressive civil rights action was not yet established in the public mind, much less in the context of the military with its far greater restrictions on personal liberties. Bear in mind that our actions came 10 years before Rosa Parks refused to give her seat to a white man in Montgomery, Alabama, and more than 20 years before Martin Luther King, Jr. marched on Washington. Still, we were committed to our cause, and believed that whatever the outcome, we had no choice but to proceed as we did.

Battle received a formal reprimand. He returned to training before being honorably discharged in August 1945. In 1995, his reprimand was finally expunged.

== After the war ==
Battle attended the Juilliard School before transferring to Morgan State University, where he earned a bachelor's degree in musical education. He also received a master's degree in education from the University of Maryland.

=== Educator ===
In the fall of 1950, Battle was hired as a music teacher at Douglass High School. By the spring term, he had assembled a stage band. Over the next eight years, the Douglass High School band won first place in fourteen competitions. In 1958, the band became the first African-American group featured in the prestigious musical yearbook First Chair of America. The band also featured in Jet Magazine.

Battle tried to fight segregation in the Washington Redskins organization. He wanted the team's marching band and cheerleaders, the Redskinettes, to be desegregated. Battle encouraged two of his band members to audition for the Washington Redskins band. Both men complained about the application process, claiming the Redskins organization was not sending out applications to African Americans. Joel Margolis, the Redskins business manager said that "not many colored apply, Last year we had fifty one tryouts and only one was colored." Battle said that advertising towards colored applicants were being ignored by the Redskins.

In 1959, Prince Edward County, Virginia shut down its public schools to avoid racial integration. Battle attended the NAACP-sponsored protest rally along with three of Douglass High School's trumpet players. Battle also served as a guidance counselor and assistant principal. He retired in 1978.

=== Jazz musician ===
While fighting with the Redskins, Battle continued to create music with his own jazz band. LeRoy Battle and the Altones became a very famous band in Maryland. They were given a regularly scheduled gig on the Tony Kornheiser show on ESPN Radio.

During the period 1992–1996 Battle worked in sessions with Eva Cassidy. On Cassidy's (1992) album The Other Side, recorded with Chuck Brown, Battle is credited with trombone on "Let the Good Times Roll", organ on "I'll Go Crazy", and trumpet on "Red Top". Battle is also credited with engineering Cassidy's 1996 album Live at Blues Alley.

In 1995, Battle published his autobiography, "Easier Said".

== Awards ==
- Congressional Gold Medal (2007)

== Personal life ==
Battle married his first wife in 1950. The couple had one son, Lamont Terrell Battle. They later divorced. He and his second wife, Alice Elizabeth Holt, had two children, LeRoy Battle Jr. and Lisa Battle-Singletary. Battle and Holt married in 1958 and remained together until her death in 2014. At the time of his death, Battle had five grandchildren. He was a member of the Adams United Methodist Church in Harwood, Maryland.

A resident of Harwood, Battle died at the Anne Arundel Medical Center in Annapolis, Maryland on March 28, 2015.
