= Joseph Noble Stockett =

American landowner (1779-1853)

- Born: November 16, 1779. Harwood, Maryland, US
- Died: December 21, 1854 (aged 75); Annapolis, Maryland, US
- Occupation(s): Landowner, bridge builder
- Notable work: Governor's Bridge

Joseph Noble Stockett (1779-1853) was a Maryland landowner during the early 19th century.

== Career ==
Stockett was a staunch Federalist who studied medicine but never practiced. He was a member of the Whig Party.

He inherited the family home known as Obligation in Harwood, Maryland and expanded it to its current size.

On February 4, 1817, the State of Maryland commissioned Stockett and James Sanders, both of Anne Arundel County, to build a new bridge over the Patuxent River.

== Personal life ==
His father was Dr. Thomas Noble Stockett. He was married four times and fathered eight children. He hunted foxes, raised horses, and was a member of the South River Club.
