= Arden on the Severn, Maryland =

- Census-designated place
- Coordinates: 39°4′16″N 76°35′25″W
- Country: United States
- State: Maryland
- County: Anne Arundel

Area
  - Total: 1.64 sq mi (4.24 km^{2})
  - Land: 1.43 sq mi (3.70 km^{2})
  - Water: 0.21 sq mi (0.54 km^{2})
- Elevation: 49 ft (15 m)

Population (2020)
  - Total: 1,881
  - Density: 1,316.7/sq mi (508.38/km^{2})
- Time zone: UTC−5 (Eastern (EST))
  - Summer (DST): UTC−4 (EDT)
- ZIP code: 21032
- Area codes: 410 and 443 and 667
- FIPS code: 24-02025
- GNIS feature ID: 1710535

Arden on the Severn is a census-designated place (CDP) in Anne Arundel County, Maryland. The population was 1,880 at the 2020 census. Its homes offer residents private waterfront beaches including private docks and boat slips as well as access to four private community beaches.

The homes in Arden on the Severn are considered to be amongst some of the most sought after residential properties in the State of Maryland, as the community is secluded from main roads and business, but is close enough to the main highways offering residents easy commuting routes with low amounts of traffic to the Washington, D.C., Annapolis, and Baltimore metro areas.

== Geography ==
Arden on the Severn is located at 39°4′16″N 76°35′25″W (39.071009, −76.590347).

According to the United States Census Bureau, the city has a total area of 1.6 square miles (4.2 km^{2}), of which 1.4 square miles (3.7 km^{2}) is land and 0.19 square miles (0.5 km^{2}), or 12.75%, is water.

== History ==
According to the town center in Arden on the Severn, the area was used in the past for mining and cultivation. It developed into a community as the miners and cultivators remained close to and resided in the areas by the mines, especially areas closest to the beaches.

== Demographics ==
Historical population
Census	Pop.	Note	%±
2010	1,953		—
2020	1,881		−3.7%
U.S. Decennial Census

=== 2020 census ===
As of the 2020 census, Arden on the Severn had a population of 1,881. The median age was 45.8 years. 18.8% of residents were under the age of 18 and 19.5% of residents were 65 years of age or older. For every 100 females there were 97.8 males, and for every 100 females age 18 and over there were 99.1 males age 18 and over.

93.1% of residents lived in urban areas, while 6.9% lived in rural areas.

There were 739 households in Arden on the Severn, of which 25.2% had children under the age of 18 living in them. Of all households, 61.8% were married-couple households, 13.0% were households with a male householder and no spouse or partner present, and 20.2% were households with a female householder and no spouse or partner present. About 19.6% of all households were made up of individuals and 9.9% had someone living alone who was 65 years of age or older.

There were 782 housing units, of which 5.5% were vacant. The homeowner vacancy rate was 0.7% and the rental vacancy rate was 3.5%.

Racial composition as of the 2020 census
Race	Number	Percent
White	1,657	88.1%
Black or African American	39	2.1%
American Indian and Alaska Native	6	0.3%
Asian	23	1.2%
Native Hawaiian and Other Pacific Islander	0	0.0%
Some other race	12	0.6%
Two or more races	144	7.7%
Hispanic or Latino (of any race)	86	4.6%

== Community ==
Most of the children in the community attend Old Mill School nearby private schools, including Indian Creek.

There are a total of four private community-sponsored beaches in the town, including Kayak Beach which offers residents dry docked storage for Kayaks and Scull Boats.

Homes in Arden on the Severn directly overlook The Severn River from the east to the west, and offer residents direct access to Annapolis by either boat or car in under 25 minutes.

Crabbing is a popular activity among residents, each household is permitted to use up to two crab traps per property during the crabbing season which runs from May to late October. Residents can typically trap between 5-7 Maryland Blue Crabs per day using cage traps and bait, and store trapped crabs in a separate holding cage.

Many residents dock both powered and sail boats as well as jet skis.
