= Russett, Maryland =

Unincorporated community in Maryland, United States

- Unincorporated community
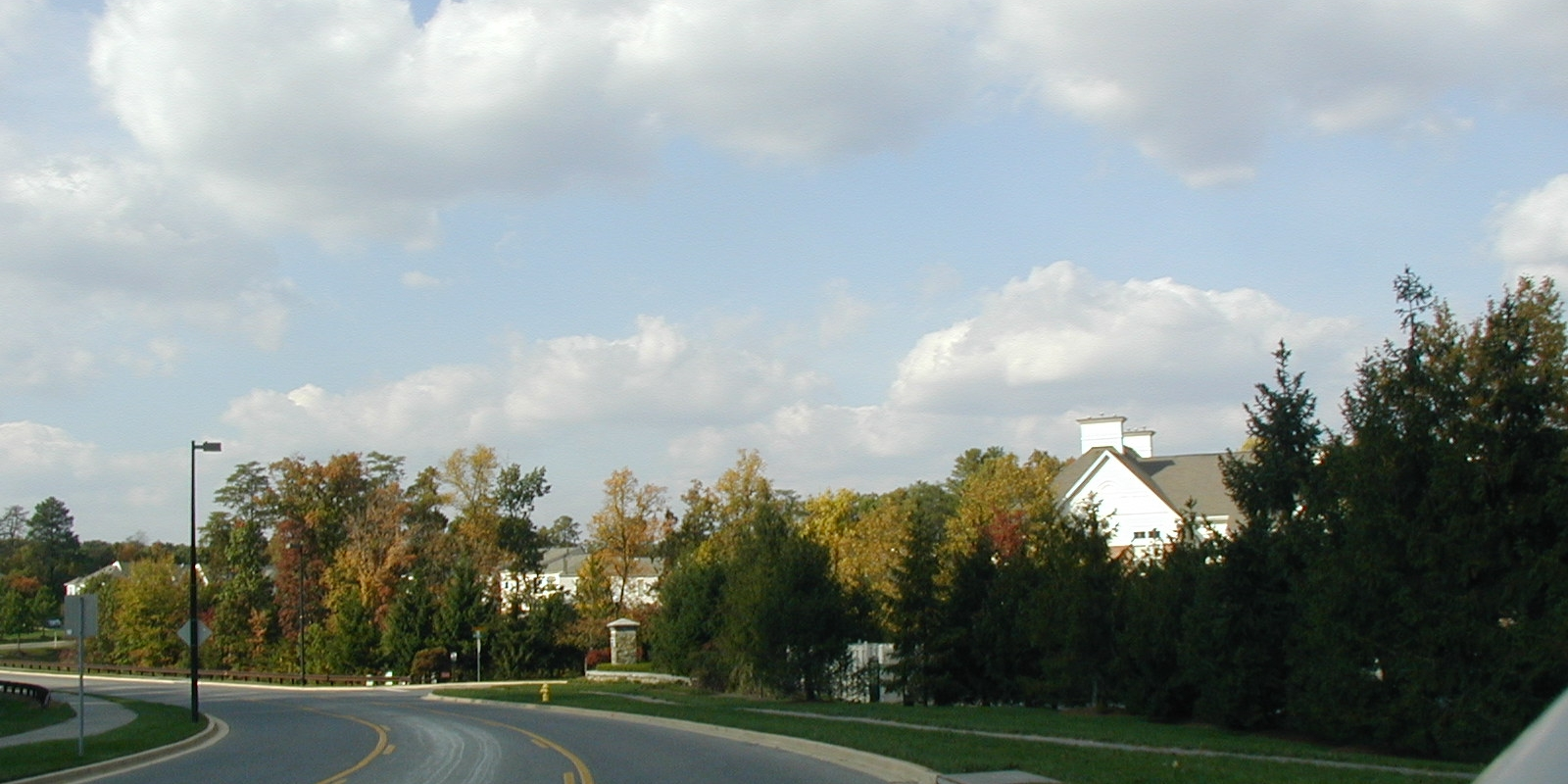
- Downtown Russett, Maryland in November 2007

- Location in Maryland Russett (the United States)
- Coordinates: 39°06.5′N 76°48.2′W
- Country: United States
- State: Maryland
- County: Anne Arundel
- Established: 1992

Government
  - Type: Homeowners' association (7-member elected board of directors)

Area
  - Total: 0.96 sq mi (2.48 km^{2})

Population
  - Total: 13,000
- Time zone: UTC-5 (EST)
  - Summer (DST): UTC-4 (EDT)
- Website: www.russett.org

Russett is an unincorporated planned community of 613 acres (2.48 km^{2}) within the Maryland City census-designated place in far-western Anne Arundel County, Maryland, United States. It is situated in a park-like setting complemented by 12 miles (19 km) of walking trails and a 70-acre (280,000 m^{2}) lake nature preserve.

Approximately 13,000 residents live in Russett, which is divided into 21 residential neighborhoods, including four condominium communities, 11 town homes, and six single-family home neighborhoods. Three apartment rental properties on four sites pay assessments to Russett, as do several on-site commercial properties. The community is built out to a capacity of 3,600 units.

== Organization ==
The Russett Community Association, Inc. (RCA) is the homeowners' association (HOA), and all homeowners are members. Annual HOA fees paid by homeowners fund an annual $2.5 million budget, which goes toward maintenance of playgrounds; a tot lot; tennis, basketball and beach volleyball courts; four pools and a pool house; walking trails; a community center; and private security. Russett is served by the Western District of Anne Arundel County police. The police substation is about 8 miles (13 km) away in Odenton and opened in 2006.

Except for condominiums, which have their own board of directors, each neighborhood has a committee with up to three members (elected at the annual RCA meeting). These three elect a chairperson who serves as the voting member. Representatives from all neighborhoods meet monthly and advise on community issues, with voting members deciding on changes to community documents, special fee assessments, and membership in the board of directors.

In November 2018, FirstService Residential contracted with Russett to provide property management services for the community.

== Geography ==
Russett is bordered by the Little Patuxent River and 70 acres (280,000 m^{2}) of wetlands within the Oxbow Lake Nature Preserve, which attracts waterfowl and other birds. The Nature Conservancy considers the preserve's Oxbow Lake the largest naturally occurring freshwater lake in the state. Also adjacent to Russett, along its southwestern borders, is an undisturbed 78-acre (320,000 m^{2}) land parcel owned by the Anne Arundel County Board of Education.

== Government services ==
Within Russett is a $4.3 million library operated by Anne Arundel County Public Library. Completed in 1998, The Maryland City at Russett Branch is more than 15,000 square feet (1,400 m^{2}) – or four times the size of its shuttered predecessor – with an initial collection of 80,000 items. The project was built on two acres (8,100 m^{2}) donated by the developer, Russett Community Limited Partnership (RCLP).

Russett is within the 20724 ZIP Code and falls within Maryland State Senate and House of Delegates District 32. The community also lies within Maryland's 3rd congressional district and Anne Arundel County's 4th Council District.

== History ==
Russett faced growth pressures triggered by the 2005 base realignment and closure process (known as BRAC). About 22,000 defense workers were expected to relocate to nearby Fort Meade over the next several years. About 100 to 150 households would move to Russett over that period because of BRAC, according to state projections.

== Schools ==
The community is served by Anne Arundel County Public Schools and several private schools.

- Monarch Global Academy, a new contract school serving Russett community children in grades K–8.
- Brock Bridge Elementary School. The school serves children in grades K–5.
- Maryland City Elementary School. The school serves children in grades P-K5.
- MacArthur Middle School. The school serves children in grades 6–8.
- Meade Middle School. The school serves children in grades 6–8.
- Chesapeake Science Point Charter School, a charter school that serves Russett community children in grades 6–12.
- St. Mary of the Mills, a private school that serves children in grades K–8.
- Bethel Christian Academy. This is a private school that serves children in grades PK–8.
- Meade High School. The school serves children in grades 9–12. Meade is home to the 2015 Men's Basketball 4A State Champions.
- St. Vincent Pallotti High School. This is a private school that serves students in grades 9–12. Pallotti is home to the 2014 Maryland Interscholastic Athletic Association C Conference Football Champions.

== Gallery ==
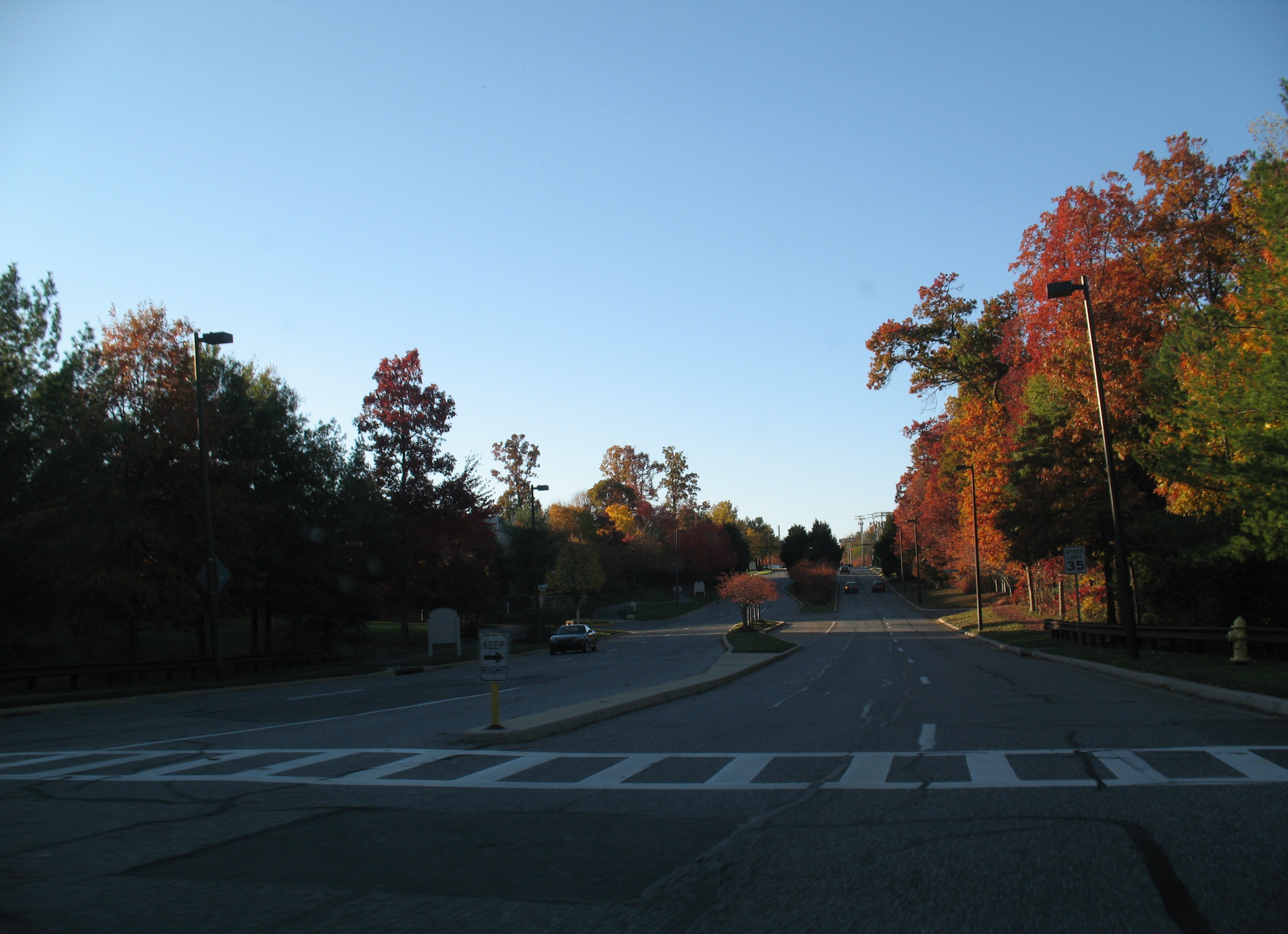
Russett Green West, the primary collector through Russett

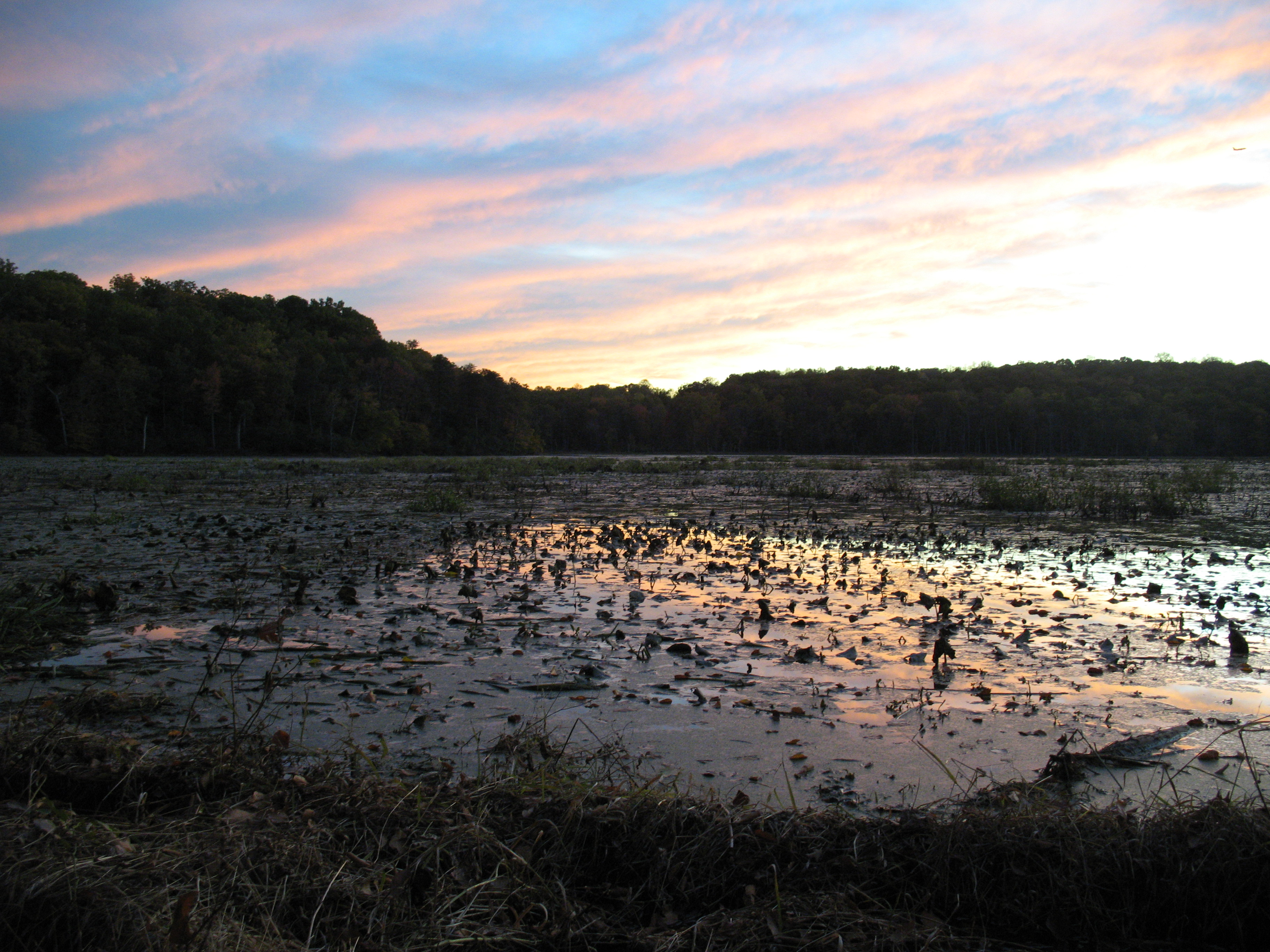
Oxbow formation along the west side of Russett

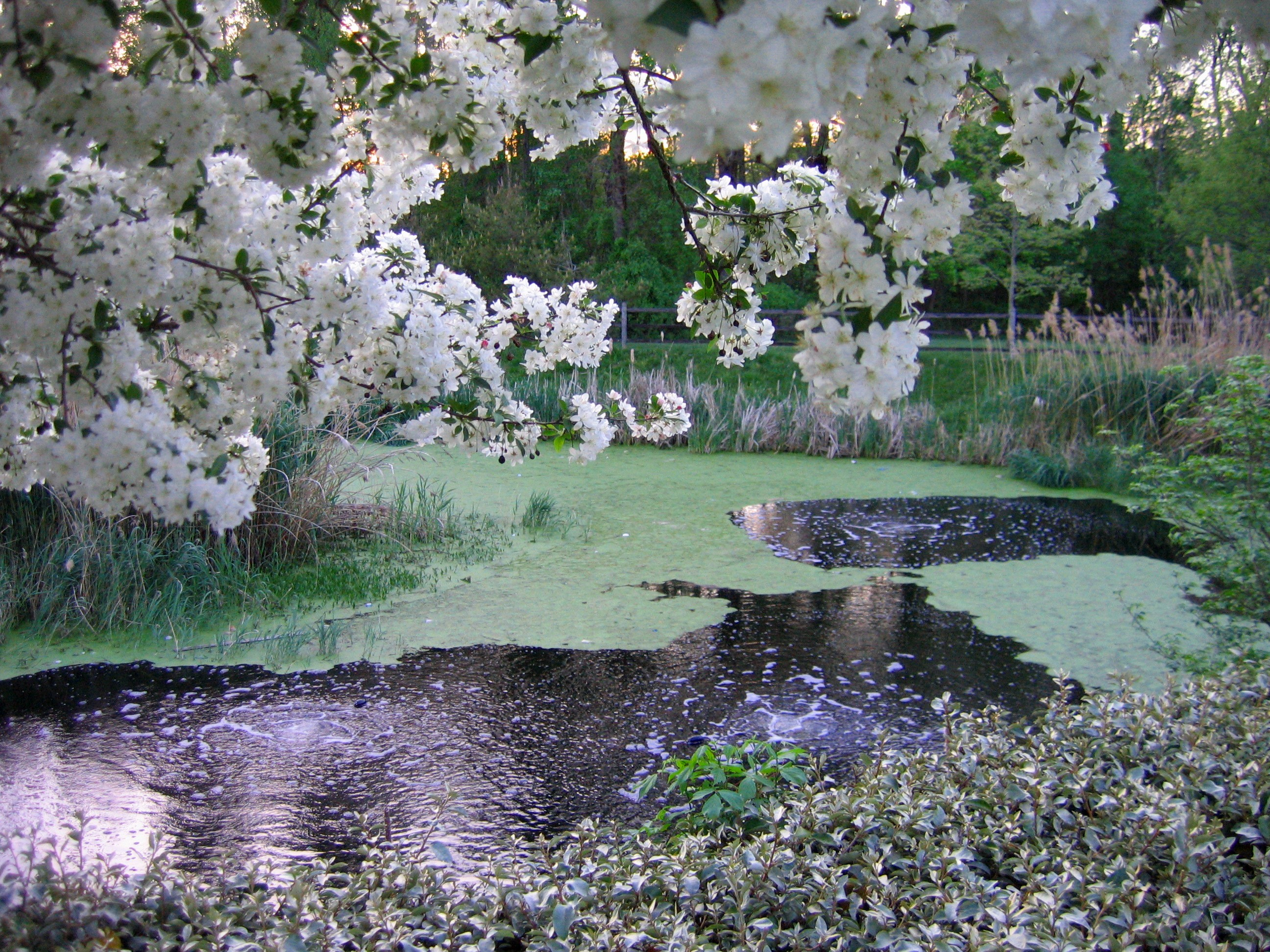
Stormwater management pond

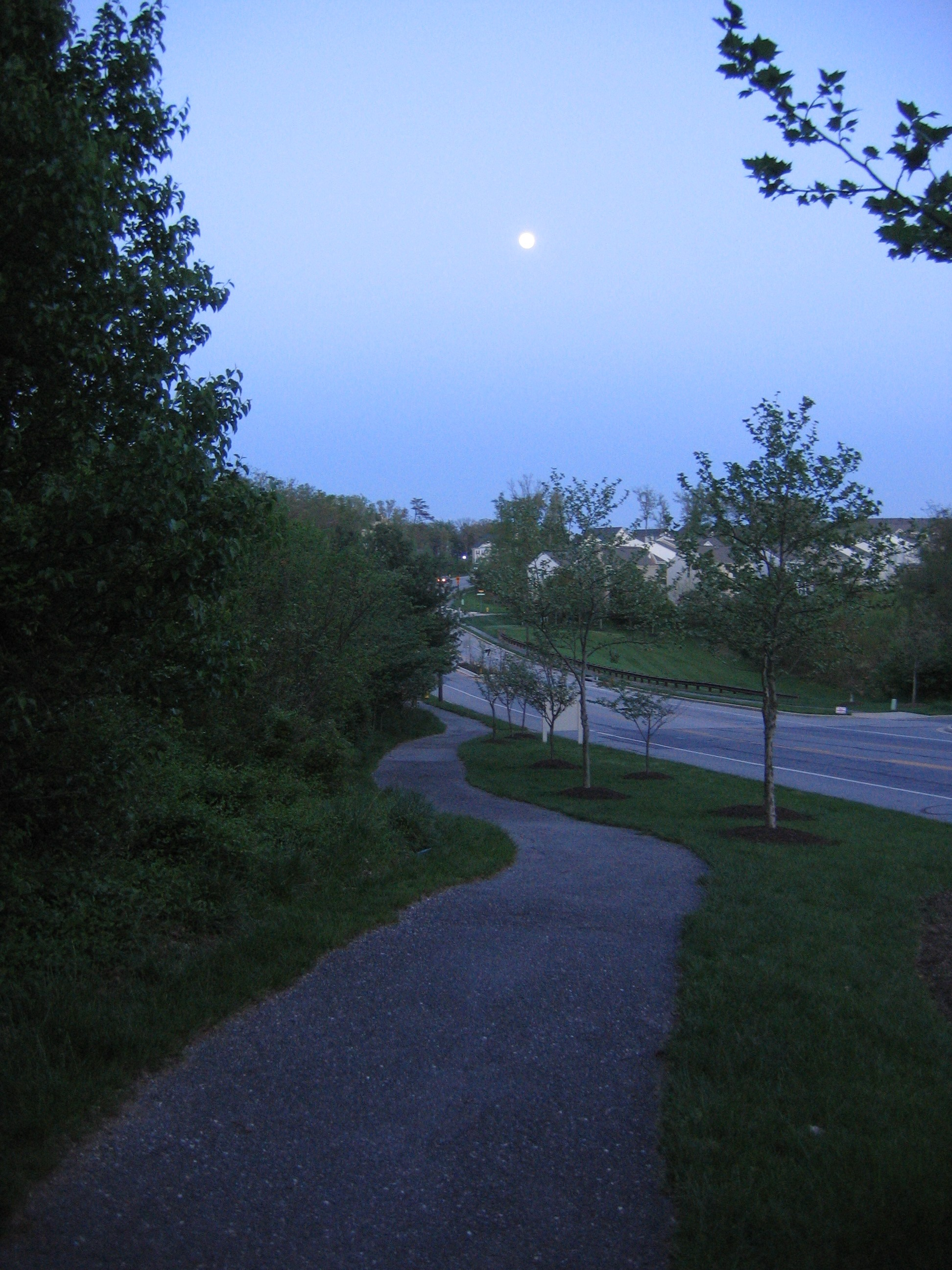
Hiker/biker trail

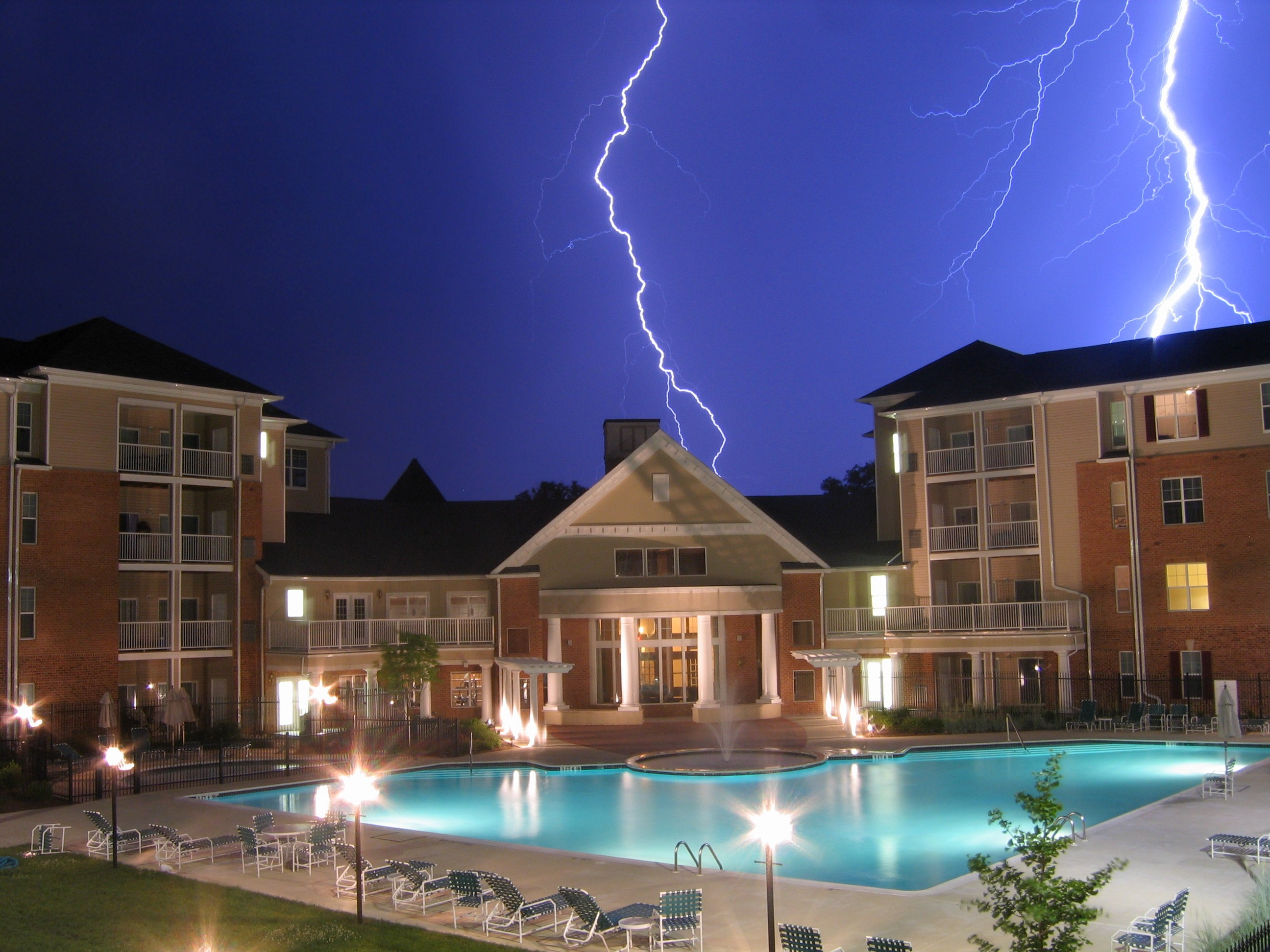
Concord Park apartments during an electrical storm
