= Harwood, Maryland =

Unincorporated community in Maryland, United States

- Unincorporated community
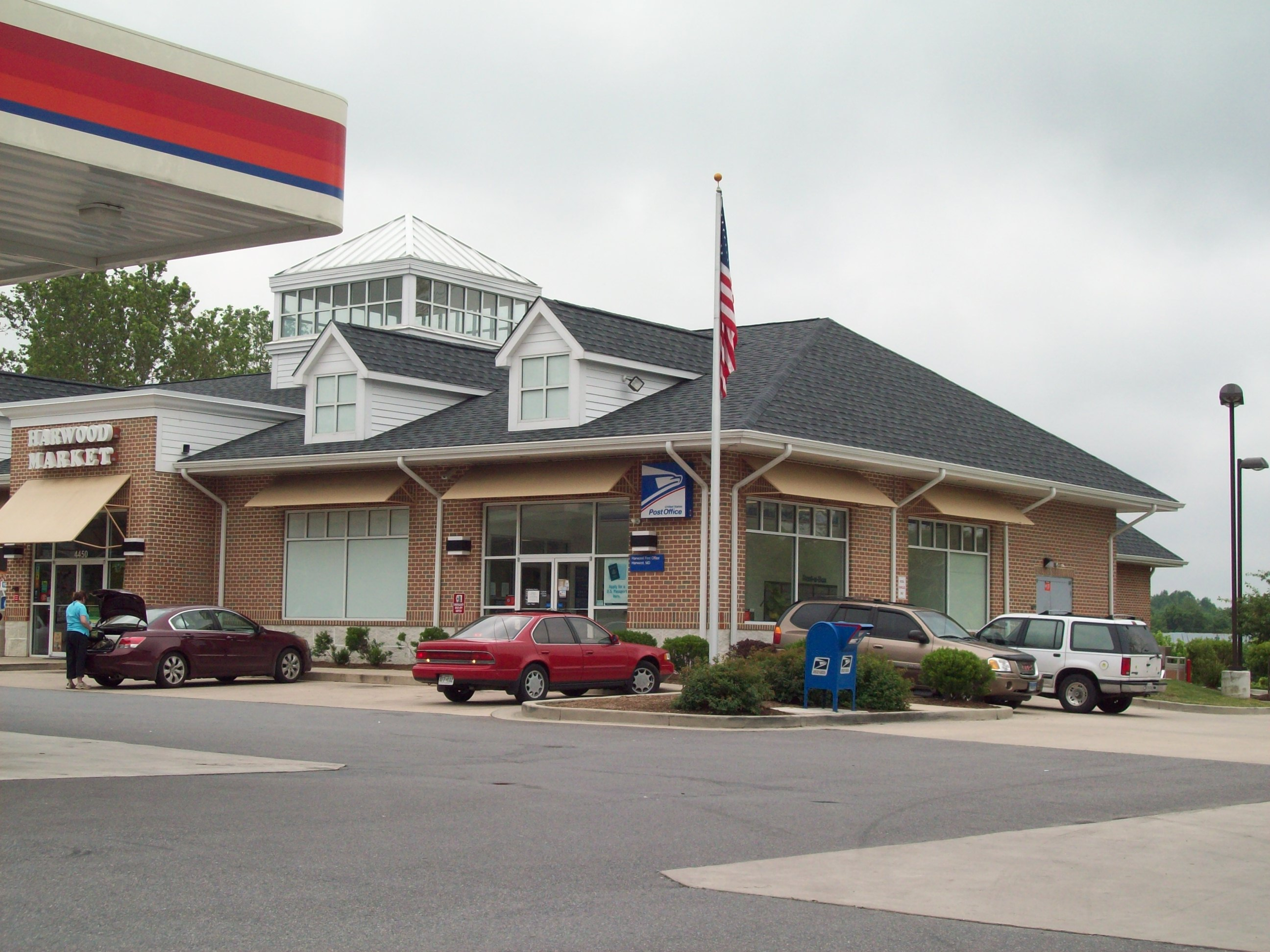
- The U.S. Post Office at Harwood, Maryland, in May 2010

- Location within the state of Maryland Harwood, Maryland (the United States)
- Coordinates: 38°51′54″N 76°37′12″W
- Country: United States
- State: Maryland
- County: Anne Arundel
- Time zone: UTC-5 (Eastern (EST))
  - Summer (DST): UTC-4 (EDT)
- ZIP code: 20776
- Area codes: 410, 443 and 667
- GNIS feature ID: 590432

Harwood is a crossroads in Anne Arundel County, Maryland, United States, south of Annapolis on Maryland Route 2 (Solomons Island Road).

== Education ==
Southern High School is nearby. A small portion of high school students in Harwood also attend South River High School in nearby Edgewater as well.

== Historic structures ==
- Etowah
- Obligation
- Larkin's Hill Farm
- Larkin's Hundred
- Tulip Hill
- Oakwood

== Notable people ==
- LeRoy Battle (1921–2015), music teacher and Tuskegee Airman
- Molly Schuyler (1980), American competitive eater; nine time Z-Burger Champ
- Pete Stark (1931–2020), retired congressman
- Stan Stearns (1935–2012), photographer
- Thomas Noble Stockett (1747–1802), surgeon and Revolutionary War veteran
- Joseph Noble Stockett (1779–1854), 18th/19th century landowner
- George Washington (1732–1799), dined at Rawlings' Tavern.
