= South Gate, Maryland =

- Former census-designated place
- Location of South Gate, Maryland
- Coordinates: 39°7′56″N 76°37′52″W
- Country: United States
- State: Maryland
- County: Anne Arundel

Area
  - Total: 6.3 sq mi (16.3 km^{2})
  - Land: 6.3 sq mi (16.3 km^{2})
  - Water: 0 sq mi (0.0 km^{2})
- Elevation: 66 ft (20 m)

Population (2000)
  - Total: 28,672
  - Density: 4,544/sq mi (1,754.4/km^{2})
- Time zone: UTC−5 (Eastern (EST))
  - Summer (DST): UTC−4 (EDT)
- FIPS code: 24-73550
- GNIS feature ID: 1867301

South Gate was a census-designated place (CDP) in Anne Arundel County, Maryland, United States, for the 2000 census, at which time its population was 28,672. It was added primarily to the Glen Burnie CDP for the 2010 census.

== Geography ==
South Gate is located at 39°7′56″N 76°37′52″W (39.132358, −76.631126).

According to the United States Census Bureau, the CDP had a total area of 6.3 square miles (16 km^{2}), all land.

== Demographics ==
As of the census of 2000, there were 28,672 people, 11,273 households, and 7,372 families living in the CDP. The population density was 4,543.9 inhabitants per square mile (1,754.4/km^{2}). There were 11,750 housing units at an average density of 1,862.1 per square mile (719.0/km^{2}). The racial makeup of the CDP was 70.94% White, 19.64% African American, 0.35% Native American, 5.28% Asian, 0.09% Pacific Islander, 1.30% from other races, and 2.39% from two or more races. Hispanic or Latino of any race were 3.14% of the population.

There were 11,273 households, out of which 35.0% had children under the age of 18 living with them, 45.0% were married couples living together, 15.3% had a female householder with no husband present, and 34.6% were non-families. 25.9% of all households were made up of individuals, and 4.2% had someone living alone who was 65 years of age or older. The average household size was 2.53 and the average family size was 3.06.

The age distribution was 25.9% under the age of 18, 10.9% from 18 to 24, 35.8% from 25 to 44, 20.6% from 45 to 64, and 6.8% who were 65 years of age or older. The median age was 32 years. For every 100 females, there were 95.5 males. For every 100 females age 18 and over, there were 92.8 males.

The median income for a household in the CDP was $48,867, and the median income for a family was $55,780. Males had a median income of $37,529 versus $27,924 for females. The per capita income for the CDP was $22,061. About 5.1% of families and 6.5% of the population were below the poverty line, including 8.5% of those under age 18 and 2.4% of those age 65 or over.
