= Alexander Hamilton High School (Brooklyn) =

Coordinates: 40.675654°N 73.939288°W

Information
- Established: 1903
- Closed: 1984

Alexander Hamilton Technical and Vocational High School is a former high school in Crown Heights, Brooklyn, New York, named after Alexander Hamilton, chief staff aide to General George Washington, one of the most influential interpreters and promoters of the U.S. Constitution, and the founder of the nation's financial system as the first United States Secretary of the Treasury. It was constructed in 1903, and closed in February 1984. The building it was in later opened in the fall of 1985 as Paul Robeson High School.

== Notable alumni ==
- Eugene Ashley Jr. – US Army Special Forces soldier and Medal of Honor recipient
- LeRoy Battle – Tuskegee Airman and musician
- Howard Cosell – sports journalist
- Dolly King – professional basketball player and pioneer of racial integration in the sport
- Honey Russell – Naismith Memorial Basketball Hall of Fame inductee
- Sammy Strain – R&B and doo-wop singer
- William B. Ruger - Firearms designer/manufacturer
