= Larkin's Hill Farm =

Historic house in Maryland, United States

- U.S. National Register of Historic Places
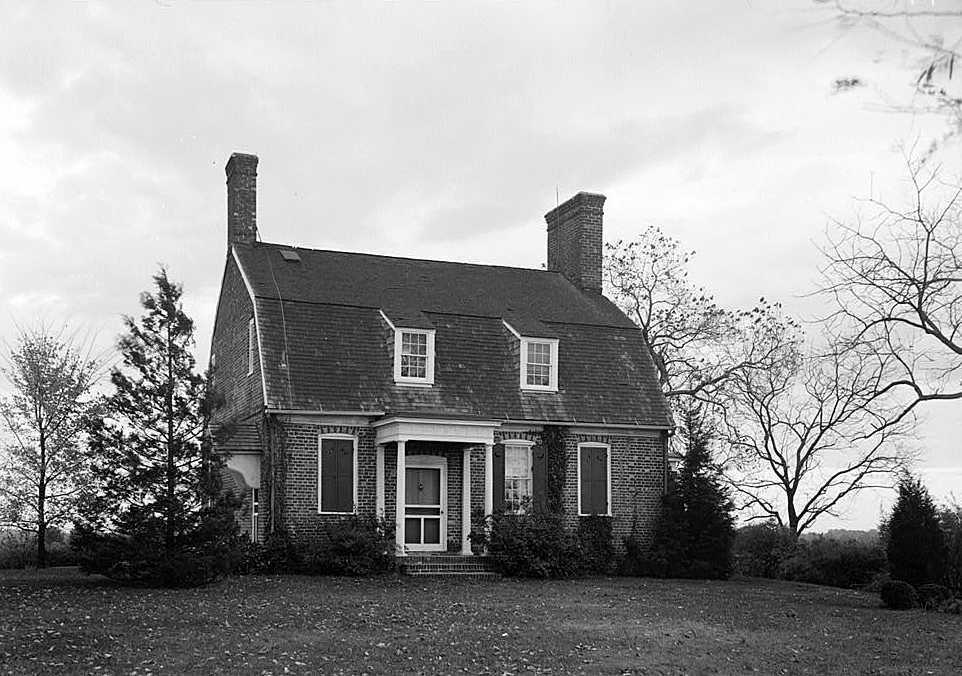
- Larkin's Hill Farm in 1936

- Location within Maryland Location within the United States
- Nearest city: Harwood, Maryland
- Coordinates: 38°53′09″N 76°35′47″W
- Built: 1753
- NRHP reference No.: 69000062
- Added to NRHP: May 15, 1969

Larkin's Hill Farm is a historic home at Harwood, Anne Arundel County, Maryland, United States. It is a 1 1/2-story gambrel-roofed brick house with a 20th-century wing. In 1683 the estate served as a temporary capital of Maryland. John Larkin, an early Quaker settler in the area, later operated an inn here as a stopping place on the first regular postal route in Maryland, which ran from St. Mary's City to Annapolis. The present brick house was built during the ownership of Lord High Sheriff of Annapolis Captain John Gassaway, the grandson of pioneer politician Colonel Nicholas Gassaway, shortly after his acquisition of the property in 1753.

Larkin's Hill Farm was listed on the National Register of Historic Places in 1969.
