= Sherwood Forest, Anne Arundel County, Maryland =

Unincorporated community in Maryland, United States

Sherwood Forest, Maryland
- Unincorporated community
- Location within the state of Maryland Sherwood Forest, Maryland (the United States)
- Coordinates: 39°01′39″N 76°32′38″W
- Country: United States
- State: Maryland
- County: Anne Arundel
- Time zone: UTC-5 (Eastern (EST))
  - Summer (DST): UTC-4 (EDT)
- GNIS feature ID: 591273

Sherwood Forest is an unincorporated community in Anne Arundel County, Maryland, United States.

== History ==
In the early 1900s, oriental rug salesman William Cochran joined a group that planned to build an amusement park on what was Startzman Farm, outside of Annapolis. That plan fell through. In 1914, there was a place called Sherwood Forest where Cochran began clearing trees to build a bucolic summer resort for middle-class families. 341 homes were built in the planned community along with a golf course, clubhouse, softball field, general store, post office, swimming pool, bowling alley, library, pier, marina, and tennis courts. Homes sites in the community are leased for 99 years, from the community association. Demand for the homes is high and most of these homes, when available, are leased by current residents or their relatives. Approval to lease a home site requires sponsorship from current residents.

== Culture ==
The community, which is gated, is split in terms of control between the Sherwood Forest Club, and the Sherwood Forest Company. The Club controls the community activities and bylaws of the community, while the Sherwood Forest Company has control of the maintenance of the roads, piers, amenities, waterfront, and other physical aspects of the community. The community has restrictive bylaws intended to ensure the cottages and homes within the community blend into the surrounding woods. Houses can be painted brown, green and some limited homes painted white, with green being a shade known as "Sherwood Green" developed by Bruning Paint Co. in Baltimore.

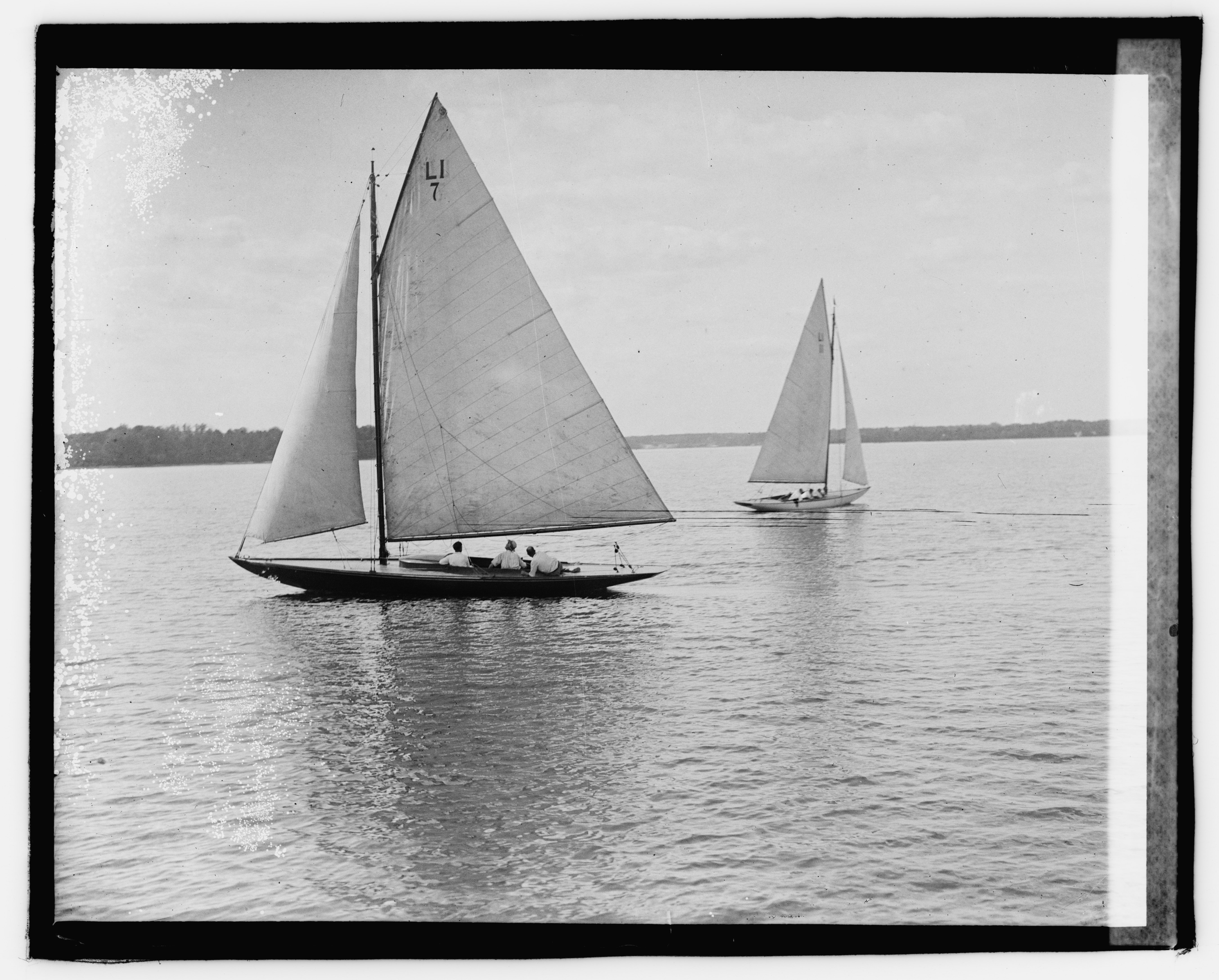
sailing in Sherwood Forest

The 9-hole Sherwood Forest Golf Course was designed by Herbert Strong and opened in 1919. The community had an additional 18-hole golf course, which was sold, and later added to the neighboring community, The Downs on the Severn.

The Sherwood Forest Club runs a summer camp for the children of its residents. The camp began in the 1920s and has changed little since that time.
