= Thomas Noble Stockett =

American surgeon (1747–1802)

Dr. Thomas Noble Stockett
- Born: July 12, 1747; Harwood, Maryland
- Died: May 16, 1802 (aged 54); Harwood, Maryland
- Occupations: Surgeon, Maryland Line

Thomas Noble Stockett was an American surgeon and revolutionary war veteran as well as a prominent landowner in Maryland.

== Biography ==
He served in Colonel Thomas Ewing's battalion under General William Smallwood's 1st Maryland Regiment, Flying Camp where he spent the winter at Valley Forge as part of the Maryland Line.

He was named a member of the Maryland Medical and Chirurgical Faculty of the State of Maryland in 1799 by an act of the Maryland General Assembly.

He inherited the family home known as Obligation in Harwood, Maryland.

== Personal life ==
His father was Thomas Stockett III. He married Mary Harwood in 1770. One of his sons was Joseph Noble Stockett, born in 1779.
