= Harundale, Maryland =

Unincorporated community in Maryland, United States

- Unincorporated community
- Location within the state of Maryland Harundale, Maryland (the United States)
- Coordinates: 39°09′10″N 76°36′53″W
- Country: United States
- State: Maryland
- County: Anne Arundel
- Time zone: UTC-5 (Eastern (EST))
  - Summer (DST): UTC-4 (EDT)

Harundale (pronounced HAIR-un-DALE) is an unincorporated community in Anne Arundel County, Maryland, United States. In 1947, the Byrne Organization made news when it set up a prefabrication shop on the 300-acre site and churned out parts for all 1,200 homes at once. The houses featured welded steel frames which formed the basis of a structure using other materials. Outside walls were a choice of brick, shingle, or aluminum siding over redwood. Inside walls were plaster.

The houses were constructed in two different styles with three or four rooms on a concrete slab, which sold for $6,900. The community was one of largest prefabricated developments in America. Their construction marked the start of phenomenal post-World War II suburbanization of previously rural Anne Arundel County. Most homes were three-bedroom and were front facing the street. A very few were side facing the street and a small number were two-bedroom units. The Governor Ritchie Highway split the community into East and West sections. The West section consisted of primarily rental units, whereas the East section homes were owned. Heating was by infloor radiant heat. The community had its own artesian well water plant. It shared an elementary school with the community of Glen Gardens in Glen Burnie and was therefore called “Glen”dale”. Community street names were all of British derivation. They ran alphabetically from North to South on both the East and West sides but were different on each side.

The needs of the new community's more than 5,000 people were first served by a strip shopping center. Harundale Mall, reportedly the first enclosed shopping mall east of the Mississippi River, was opened in 1958.
