= Annapolis Neck, Maryland =

Annapolis Neck
- Census-designated place
- Location within the U.S. state of Maryland Annapolis Neck (the United States)
- Coordinates: 38°56′12″N 76°29′53″W
- Country: United States
- State: Maryland
- County: Anne Arundel

Area
  - Total: 11.40 sq mi (29.52 km^{2})
  - Land: 6.93 sq mi (17.95 km^{2})
  - Water: 4.47 sq mi (11.57 km^{2})
- Elevation: 39 ft (12 m)

Population (2020)
  - Total: 10,973
  - Density: 1,583.0/sq mi (611.19/km^{2})
- Time zone: UTC−5 (Eastern (EST))
  - Summer (DST): UTC−4 (EDT)
- FIPS code: 24-01635
- GNIS feature ID: 2583570

Annapolis Neck, a suburb of Annapolis, is a census-designated place in Anne Arundel County, Maryland, United States. As of the 2010 census, its population was 10,950.

== Demographics ==
Historical population
Census	Pop.	Note	%±
2010	10,950		—
2020	10,973		0.2%
U.S. Decennial Census

=== 2020 census ===
As of the 2020 census, Annapolis Neck had a population of 10,973. The median age was 50.5 years. 18.9% of residents were under the age of 18 and 25.1% of residents were 65 years of age or older. For every 100 females there were 97.4 males, and for every 100 females age 18 and over there were 95.6 males age 18 and over.

100.0% of residents lived in urban areas, while 0.0% lived in rural areas.

There were 4,375 households in Annapolis Neck, of which 26.8% had children under the age of 18 living in them. Of all households, 61.6% were married-couple households, 12.9% were households with a male householder and no spouse or partner present, and 20.9% were households with a female householder and no spouse or partner present. About 22.2% of all households were made up of individuals and 12.8% had someone living alone who was 65 years of age or older.

There were 4,870 housing units, of which 10.2% were vacant. The homeowner vacancy rate was 1.8% and the rental vacancy rate was 6.1%.

Racial composition as of the 2020 census
Race	Number	Percent
White	9,177	83.6%
Black or African American	662	6.0%
American Indian and Alaska Native	5	0.0%
Asian	196	1.8%
Native Hawaiian and Other Pacific Islander	4	0.0%
Some other race	275	2.5%
Two or more races	654	6.0%
Hispanic or Latino (of any race)	587	5.3%
