= Green Haven, Maryland =

Unincorporated community in Maryland, United States

- Former census-designated place
- Location of Green Haven, Maryland
- Coordinates: 39°8′17″N 76°32′32″W
- Country: United States
- State: Maryland
- County: Anne Arundel

Area
  - Total: 3.4 sq mi (8.7 km^{2})
  - Land: 3.2 sq mi (8.3 km^{2})
  - Water: 0.19 sq mi (0.5 km^{2})
- Elevation: 49 ft (15 m)

Population (2000)
  - Total: 17,415
  - Density: 5,462/sq mi (2,108.7/km^{2})
- Time zone: UTC−5 (Eastern (EST))
  - Summer (DST): UTC−4 (EDT)
- FIPS code: 24-34975
- GNIS feature ID: 0590367

Green Haven is a neighborhood located within Pasadena, Maryland, United States. It was delineated as a census-designated place at the 2000 census, at which time its population was 17,415.

== Geography ==
Green Haven is located at 39°8′17″N 76°32′32″W (39.137999, −76.542338).

According to the United States Census Bureau, Green Haven had a total area of 3.4 square miles (8.8 km^{2}), of which 3.2 square miles (8.3 km^{2}) is land and 0.2 square miles (0.52 km^{2}) (5.34%) is water.

== Demographics ==
As of the census of 2000, there were 17,415 people, 5,921 households, and 4,695 families living in the CDP. The population density was 5,461.6 inhabitants per square mile (2,108.7/km^{2}). There were 6,102 housing units at an average density of 1,913.7 per square mile (738.9/km^{2}). The racial makeup of the CDP was 91.96% White, 4.36% African American, 0.46% Native American, 1.31% Asian, 0.02% Pacific Islander, 0.49% from other races, and 1.40% from two or more races. Hispanic or Latino of any race were 1.47% of the population.

There were 5,921 households, out of which 47.0% had children under the age of 18 living with them, 61.5% were married couples living together, 12.5% had a female householder with no husband present, and 20.7% were non-families. 15.1% of all households were made up of individuals, and 2.8% had someone living alone who was 65 years of age or older. The average household size was 2.94 and the average family size was 3.26.

In Green Haven the population was spread out, with 30.4% under the age of 18, 7.3% from 18 to 24, 38.3% from 25 to 44, 18.9% from 45 to 64, and 5.2% who were 65 years of age or older. The median age was 32 years. For every 100 females, there were 98.3 males. For every 100 females age 18 and over, there were 94.7 males.

The median income for a household in the CDP was $60,211, and the median income for a family was $62,800. Males had a median income of $41,576 versus $30,113 for females. The per capita income for the CDP was $21,962. About 1.7% of families and 2.9% of the population were below the poverty line, including 1.7% of those under age 18 and 6.2% of those age 65 or over.

== History ==
Green Haven began as a day-trip destination for residents of Baltimore City, directly north of Pasadena. Green Haven was just a short boat ride from the city.

Green Haven developed into a small community in the early 20th century, with a district town center. With the rise of suburbs, Green Haven became increasingly residential in nature, with local shops closing under pressure from nearby plazas and strip malls.

Today, Green Haven has lost much of its unique character because of the loss of its old style "summer home" charm, and the loss of its fire department that was complemented by green and white fire equipment, however, it is still the largest single neighborhood within Pasadena. Green Haven is home to one of Pasadena's two high schools, Northeast High.

== Sports Organizations ==
=== Baseball ===
- Pasadena Baseball Club

=== Softball ===
- Havenwood Girls Softball
- Green Haven Softball Assn.
