= Brooklyn–Queens Day =

Public holiday

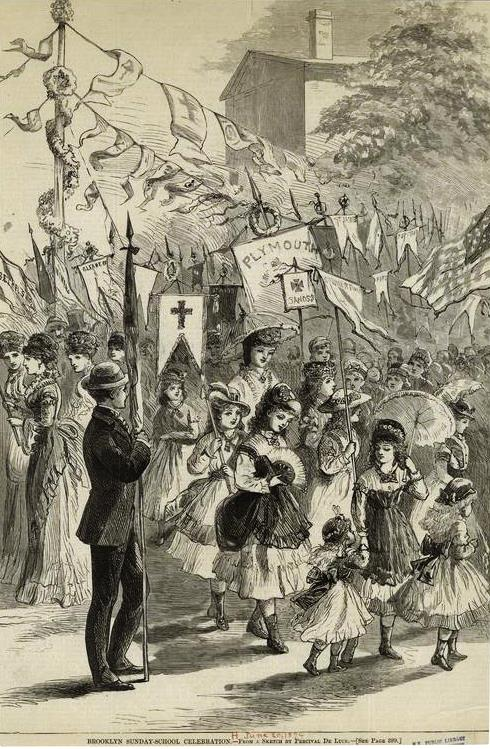
Brooklyn Anniversary Day in 1874.

Brooklyn–Queens Day, also sometimes called Welcome Back to Brooklyn Day, Kids Day and Rally Day, was a public school holiday observed in the New York City boroughs of Brooklyn and Queens.

== History ==
Newspaper publisher Robert Raikes established the first Sunday school to help children living in the slums of Gloucester. The school operated on Sunday, the only day the children could attend because many of them worked in factories the rest of the week. Thirty years later, there were 500,000 children enrolled in Sunday schools in Britain, and Sunday schools had been established elsewhere in Europe and North America.

Brooklyn held the first annual parade of Sunday schools on June 26, 1838. In the early 1860s, the New York State Legislature authorized Anniversary Day as a school holiday in Brooklyn, although banks remained open. Anniversary Day was first celebrated on May 28, 1861, on the 32nd anniversary of the founding of the Sunday School Union, a powerful Protestant organization. The law set the first Thursday in June as the day for future holidays.

In 1898, when the City of Brooklyn was consolidated into the City of Greater New York, the New York City Board of Education would not recognize Anniversary Day. After vociferous protest, the Board reversed its decision in 1902. In 1905, a law was passed to reestablish the holiday and close schools in Brooklyn on the Thursday of the week following Memorial Day in order to celebrate "the founding of the Sunday school movement in Brooklyn". After Queens held its first Sunday School Association Day Parade in 1910, schools in Queens began closing on the holiday as of 1911. The name of the holiday was later changed to Brooklyn Day, and then, in 1959, in response to lobbying for the expansion of the holiday to Queens by the Queens Federation of Churches, it was changed again to Brooklyn–Queens Day, and the day of the celebration was moved to the weekend.

Over time, the origin of the holiday as the celebration of a religious organization has been forgotten, and it became a secular holiday in celebration of Brooklyn and Queens, despite the complaints of the other boroughs that have no similar day devoted to them.

It is now observed on the first Thursday in June (if it falls in the same week as Memorial Day, it is celebrated on the second Thursday).

In the New York City Department of Education's 2005 contract with the United Federation of Teachers the holiday became citywide, giving all school children the day off but requiring all city school teachers to participate in a professional development day.

The last parade in Ridgewood was held in 2009. The tradition of a parade continues elsewhere, most recently on June 6, 2019 (before the COVID-19 pandemic), which started at Irving Square Park in Bushwick.

The replacement of Brooklyn–Queens Day on the school calendar by Diwali was proposed by City Council member Jenifer Rajkumar in 2022, and supported by Mayor Adams in 2022. The movement was successful; Diwali was added as a school holiday in 2024, but the legislation was amended to retain the school holiday for Brooklyn–Queens Day. As of 2026, Anniversary Day was a school holiday for students and a conference day with the chancellor for staff members.
