= Anne Arundel County, Maryland =

County in Maryland, United States

- County
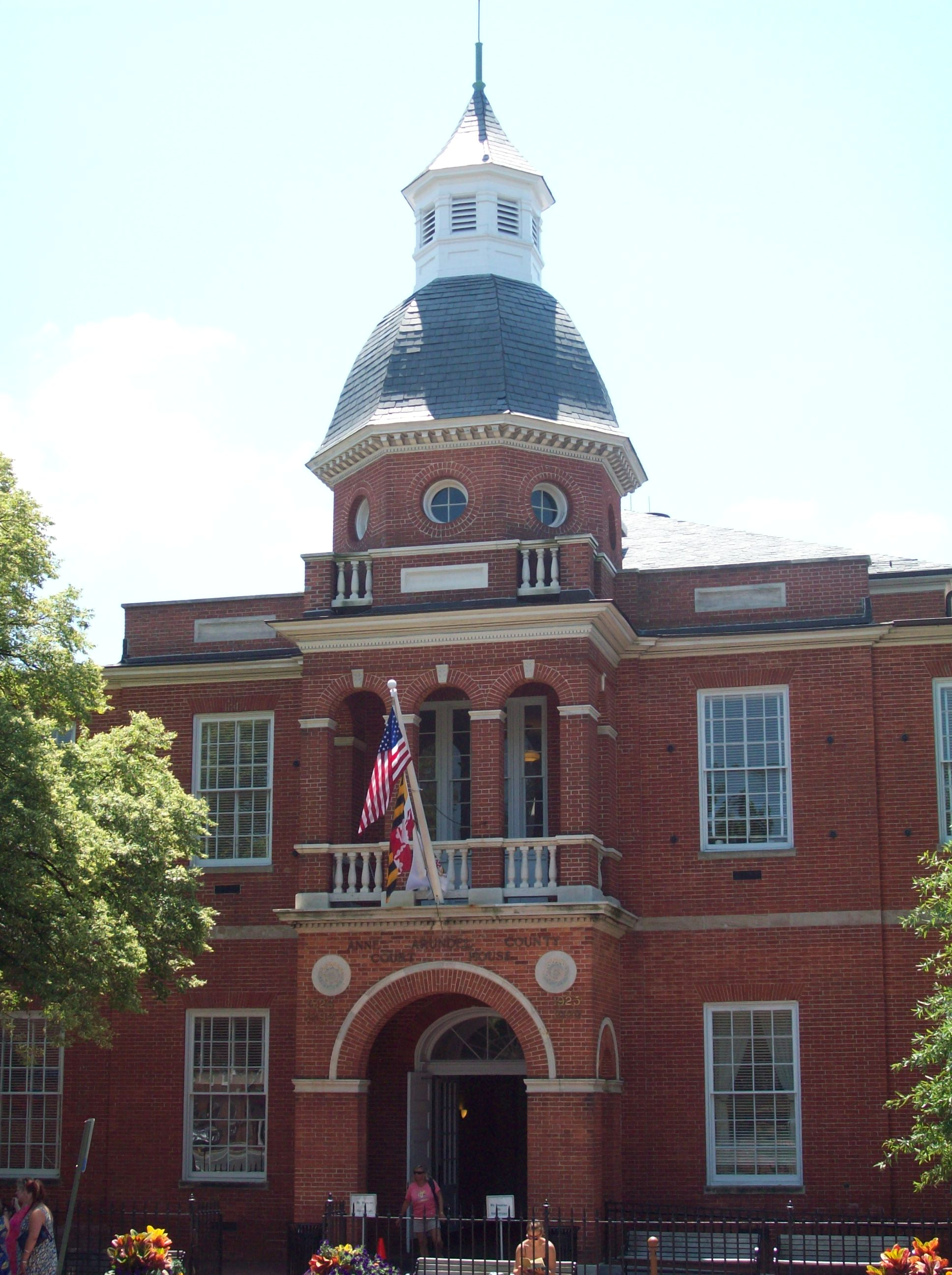
- Anne Arundel County Courthouse in Annapolis

- Flag Seal

- Location within the U.S. state of Maryland
- Interactive map of Anne Arundel County, Maryland
- Coordinates: 39°00′N 76°36′W
- Country: United States
- State: Maryland
- Founded: April 9, 1650
- Named for: Anne Arundell
- Seat: Annapolis
- Largest community: Glen Burnie

Government
  - County Executive: Steuart Pittman

Area
  - Total: 588 sq mi (1,520 km^{2})
  - Land: 415 sq mi (1,070 km^{2})
  - Water: 173 sq mi (450 km^{2}) 29%

Population (2020)
  - Total: 588,261
  - Estimate (2025): 603,380 ▲
  - Density: 1,420/sq mi (547/km^{2})
- Time zone: UTC−5 (Eastern)
  - Summer (DST): UTC−4 (EDT)
- Congressional districts: 3rd, 5th
- Website: www.aacounty.org

Anne Arundel County (/əˈrʌndəl/), also notated as AA or A.A. County, is located in the U.S. state of Maryland. As of the 2020 United States census, its population was 588,261, an increase of just under 10% since 2010. Its county seat is Annapolis, which is also the capital of the state. The county is named for Anne Arundell (c. 1615/1616–1649), Lady Baltimore, a member of the Arundell family in Cornwall, England, and the wife of Cecilius Calvert, 2nd Baron Baltimore (1605–1675), founder and first lord proprietor of the colony Province of Maryland. The county is part of the Baltimore metropolitan area and the Washington–Baltimore–Arlington combined statistical area.

== History ==
The county was named for Lady Anne Arundell (1615/1616–1649), the daughter of Thomas Arundell, 1st Baron Arundell of Wardour, members of the ancient family of Arundells in Cornwall, England. She married Cecilius Calvert, second Lord Baltimore (1605–1675), and the first lord proprietor of the colony, Province of Maryland, in an arranged marriage contract in 1627 or 1628. Modern spelling adds an 'e' to her first name of "Ann" and removes the second 'l' from the family name of "Arundell", but the old traditional spelling of her name is still used in the title of the local historical society, the Ann Arrundell County Historical Society.

Anne Arundel County was originally part of St. Mary's County, the province's first erected county in the southern portion of the Province of Maryland, which had first been established by arriving settlers in 1634. In 1650, the year after Lady Ann Arundell's death, the county separated from St. Mary's and "erected" into its own jurisdiction and became the third of the 23 Maryland counties. It was composed of the hundreds of Town Neck, Middle Neck, Broad Neck, South River, West River, and Herring Creek. Between 1654 and 1658, the county was known as "Providence" by many of its early settlers.

On March 25, 1655, after the English Civil War, (1642–1651), in Europe, the Battle of the Severn, the first naval colonial battle ever fought in North America, was fought in Anne Arundel County on the Severn River between Puritan forces supporting the Commonwealth of England and forces loyal to Lord Proprietor Cecilius Calvert. The Commonwealth forces under Captain William Fuller were victorious.

In 1692, the Church of England, also known as the Anglican Church, became the established church of the Province of Maryland through an Act of the General Assembly. Ten counties had been established in the colony, and those counties were divided into 30 parishes, with vestrymen appointed within each. Ann Arrundell County was divided into four parishes: Herring Creek, South River, Middle Neck, and Broad Neck.

Between 1694 and 1695, the provincial capital of Maryland was moved from St. Mary's City along the northern shore of the Potomac River across from the southern colonial border with the Province of Virginia in St. Mary's County farther north along the western shore of the Chesapeake Bay, midway in the colony to Annapolis in Anne Arundel County. Prior to the move, Annapolis was known as "Providence".

During the American Revolutionary War, citizens of Anne Arundel County supported the Continental Army by providing troops for three regiments. The 3rd Maryland Regiment, the 4th Maryland Regiment, and the 6th Maryland Regiment were recruited in the county.

During the War of 1812, one of the original six heavy frigates of the recently re-established United States Navy, U.S.S. Constitution, sailed from Annapolis prior to its victorious engagement with the H.M.S. Guerriere of the British Royal Navy.

On May 22, 1830, the inaugural horse-drawn train of the Baltimore and Ohio Railroad travelled the 13 miles (21 km) of the newly completed track from Mount Clare Station in southwestern Baltimore to Ellicott Mills (now Ellicott City), then in the Western or Howard District (now Howard County) of Anne Arundel County. This was the first regular railroad passenger service in the United States. In 1831, land west of the railroad was considered the Howard District of Anne Arundel County. In 1851, the Howard District was broken off to form Howard County, now the 21st county in Maryland (of 23).

The county has a number of properties on the National Register of Historic Places.

== Geography ==
According to the U.S. Census Bureau, the county has a total area of 588 sq mi (1,520 km^{2}), of which 173 sq mi (450 km^{2}) (29%) is covered by water. Anne Arundel County is located to the south of Baltimore.

Most of the county's borders are defined by water. To the east lies the western shore of the Chesapeake Bay, and numerous tidal tributaries of the bay indent the shoreline, the various rivers, creeks, streams, inlets forming prominent peninsulas, also known as "necks" (as further south in Virginia). The largest of these tributaries include (from north to south), the Magothy River, Severn River, South River, and the West River. Further south, the upper Patuxent River forms the border of Anne Arundel with Prince George's County to the west. Deep Run forms part of the northwestern border with Howard County, and Lyons Creek forms part of the southern border with Calvert County. The Patapsco River to the north is the border with Baltimore County, but the communities and areas of Brooklyn and Curtis Bay neighborhoods (and adjacent Fairfield, Wagner's Point [also known as East Brooklyn], Arundel Cove [off of Curtis Creek], and Hawkins Point), lying south of the Patapsco River were annexed from Anne Arundel County to Baltimore in the third major annexation of January 1919.

Anne Arundel County originally included all of the land between the Patuxent River and the Patapsco River (mainstem and South Branch) upstream to their headwaters on Parr's Ridge. The northwestern section of this long tract later became Howard County, with the border between the two running very close to the Atlantic Seaboard fall line. As a result, Anne Arundel County lies almost entirely within the Atlantic Coastal Plain, while Howard County is almost entirely within the Piedmont province.

Elevations in Anne Arundel County range from sea level at the Chesapeake and tidal tributaries to about 300 feet (91 m) in western areas near the fall line. The terrain is mostly flat or gently rolling, but more dramatic banks and bluffs can be found where waterways cut through areas of higher elevation.

With the exception of the very limited extent of Piedmont underlain by Precambrian to early Paleozoic metamorphic rock, all of the county is underlain by thick deposits of gravel, sand, silt, and clay dating from the early Cretaceous to Holocene times. Most of these sediments are unconsolidated but include local formations of sandstone, especially in the Pasadena area.

=== Adjacent counties and independent city ===
- Baltimore County (north)
- Baltimore City (north)
- Calvert County (south)
- Kent County (northeast)
- Howard County (northwest)
- Prince George's County (southwest)
- Queen Anne's County (east)
- Talbot County (southeast)

=== National protected area ===
- Patuxent Wildlife Research Center (part)

=== Climate ===
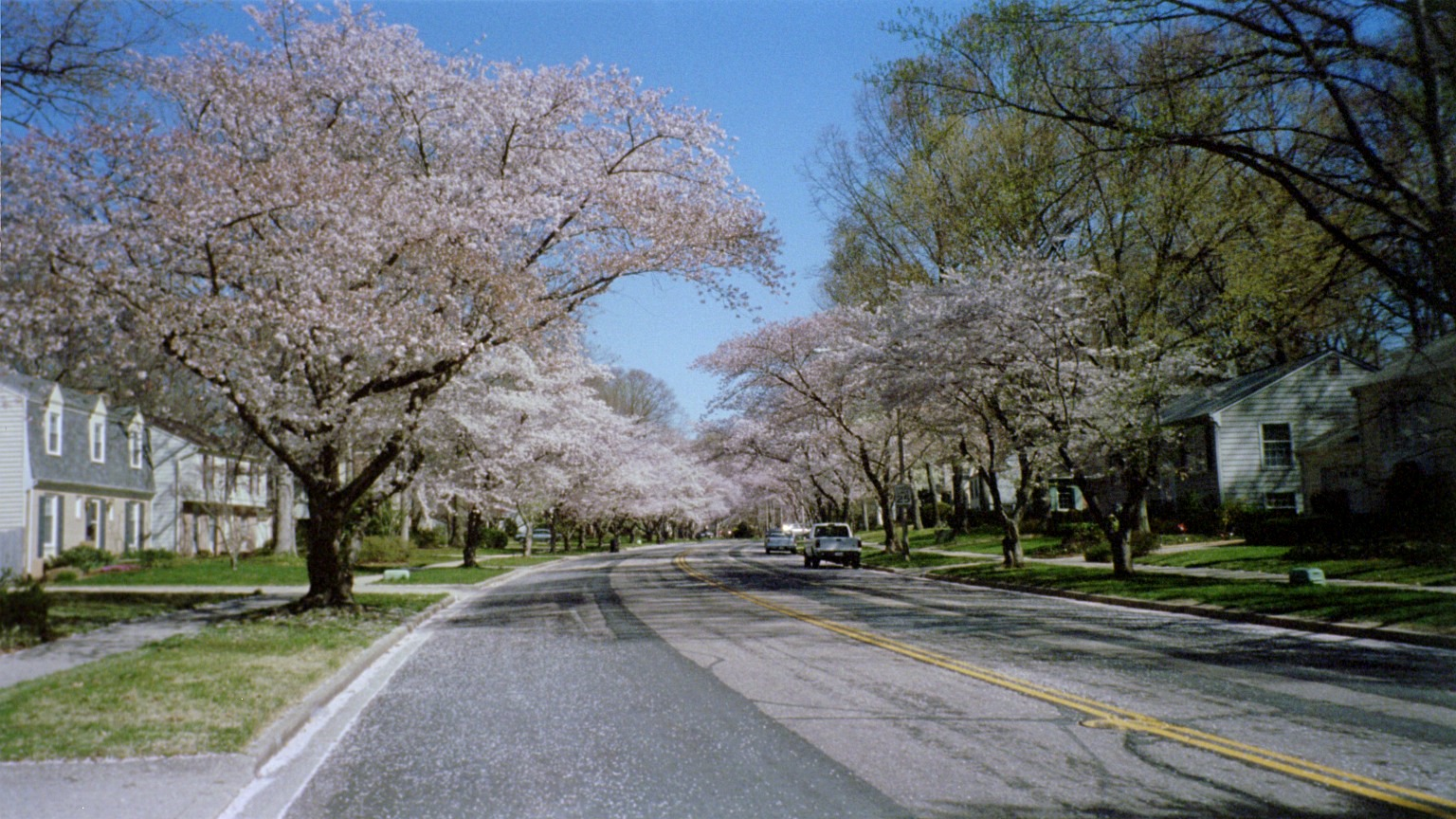
Crofton Parkway in Crofton in early March

Anne Arundel County has a humid subtropical climate, with hot summers and cool winters. Annual precipitation averages around 40 in (100 cm) per year throughout the county, with a fairly even distribution throughout the year. Annual snowfall totals around 20.1 in (51 cm) on average at BWI Airport, which has an elevation of 156 ft (47.5 m) above sea level. Slightly colder winter temperatures and higher snowfall are experienced at the higher elevations, with slightly lower snowfall closer to sea level. According to the most recent USDA Hardiness zone maps, the lowland areas of the county fall into Zone 8a, with an expected annual minimum temperatures of 10 to 15 °F (−12 to −9 °C), while higher elevation and inland areas fall into Zone 7b, with expected annual minima of 5 to 10 °F (−15 to −12 °C).

== Politics and government ==
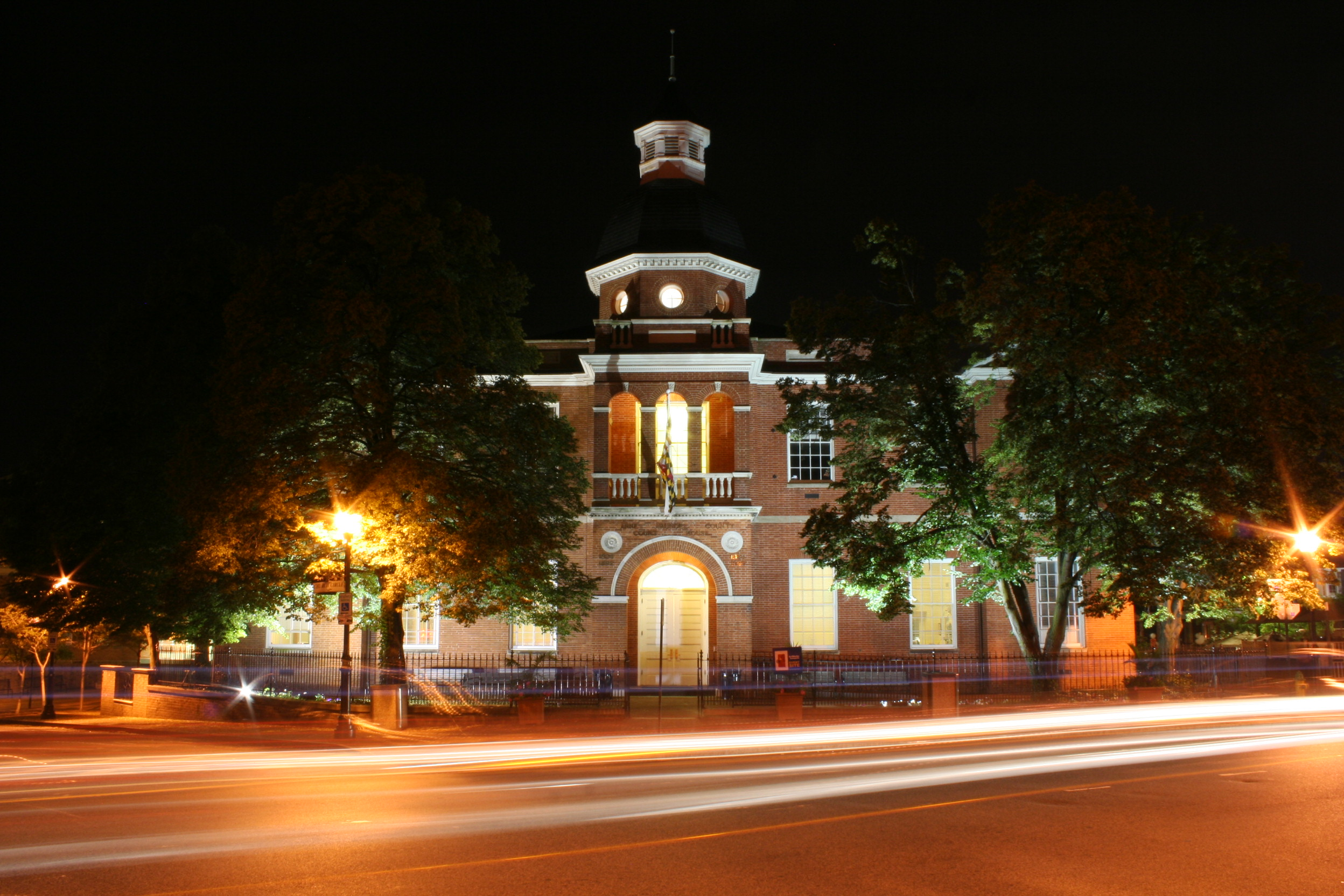
The Anne Arundel County Courthouse in June 2005

Anne Arundel County has had a charter government since 1965. The government consists of a county executive and a seven-member county council. These members are elected in the same years Maryland conducts its gubernatorial and legislative elections, and may serve a maximum of two consecutive terms.

The Democrats have the most registered voters in the county, but the large number of Republican-leaning independents means Republicans win more county-wide elections than in other mostly suburban counties in Maryland, but Democrats are the dominant party in Annapolis city elections. In the 2016 presidential election, Anne Arundel County voted for Hillary Clinton over Donald Trump by 6,016 votes. It was the first time that the county had supported a Democrat for president since 1964. Four years later, Joe Biden won the county by nearly 15%, the largest margin of victory for a Democrat in the county since the landslide election of Lyndon Johnson in the 1964 presidential election.

Anne Arundel County is one of six "reverse pivot counties", counties that voted Republican in 2008 and 2012 before voting Democratic in 2016 onward.

=== Voter registration ===
Voter registration and party enrollment as of March 2024
Democratic	172,730	41.74%
Republican	128,951	31.16%
Unaffiliated	105,269	25.44%
Libertarian	2,496	0.6%
Other parties	4,340	1.05%
Total	413,786	100%

United States presidential election results for Anne Arundel County, Maryland
Year	Republican		Democratic		Third party(ies)	
Year	No.	%	No.	%	No.	%
1856	0	0.00%	927	47.06%	1,043	52.94%
1860	3	0.14%	98	4.54%	2,058	95.32%
1864	416	20.90%	1,574	79.10%	0	0.00%
1868	344	17.08%	1,670	82.92%	0	0.00%
1872	2,546	53.32%	2,229	46.68%	0	0.00%
1876	2,245	41.77%	3,130	58.23%	0	0.00%
1880	2,450	47.08%	2,754	52.92%	0	0.00%
1884	2,813	47.72%	3,052	51.77%	30	0.51%
1888	2,992	49.17%	2,979	48.96%	114	1.87%
1892	2,800	44.31%	3,398	53.77%	121	1.91%
1896	4,030	54.88%	3,145	42.83%	168	2.29%
1900	4,045	54.32%	3,297	44.28%	104	1.40%
1904	2,849	47.64%	3,001	50.18%	130	2.17%
1908	2,926	45.47%	3,435	53.38%	74	1.15%
1912	2,222	33.60%	3,049	46.10%	1,343	20.31%
1916	2,705	38.01%	4,111	57.77%	300	4.22%
1920	6,199	54.52%	5,053	44.44%	118	1.04%
1924	3,670	44.46%	3,766	45.62%	819	9.92%
1928	10,145	61.54%	6,259	37.97%	82	0.50%
1932	5,778	36.26%	9,761	61.26%	394	2.47%
1936	8,478	42.32%	11,413	56.97%	142	0.71%
1940	9,204	41.08%	13,116	58.54%	85	0.38%
1944	10,860	51.40%	10,269	48.60%	0	0.00%
1948	10,973	54.12%	8,713	42.98%	588	2.90%
1952	23,273	60.77%	14,739	38.48%	288	0.75%
1956	28,622	64.30%	15,888	35.70%	0	0.00%
1960	30,595	54.00%	26,063	46.00%	0	0.00%
1964	26,725	41.30%	37,981	58.70%	0	0.00%
1968	36,557	47.09%	25,381	32.70%	15,687	20.21%
1972	71,707	72.26%	26,082	26.28%	1,450	1.46%
1976	61,353	53.03%	54,351	46.97%	0	0.00%
1980	69,443	52.76%	50,780	38.58%	11,409	8.67%
1984	94,171	66.04%	47,565	33.36%	855	0.60%
1988	98,540	63.53%	55,440	35.74%	1,121	0.72%
1992	81,467	43.89%	68,629	36.97%	35,538	19.14%
1996	83,574	48.68%	72,147	42.02%	15,964	9.30%
2000	104,209	51.93%	89,624	44.67%	6,824	3.40%
2004	133,231	55.59%	103,324	43.11%	3,112	1.30%
2008	129,682	49.95%	125,015	48.15%	4,922	1.90%
2012	126,832	48.75%	126,635	48.68%	6,688	2.57%
2016	122,403	45.32%	128,419	47.55%	19,259	7.13%
2020	127,821	41.28%	172,823	55.82%	8,973	2.90%
2024	128,892	41.37%	171,945	55.19%	10,735	3.45%

=== County Executives ===
The county executive oversees the executive branch of the county government, which consists of a number of offices and departments. The executive branch is charged with implementing County law and overseeing the operation of the county government.

Name	Affiliation	Term
Joseph W. Alton	Republican	1965–1974
Robert A. Pascal	Republican	1974–1982
O. James Lighthizer	Democrat	1982–1990
Robert R. Neall	Republican	1990–1994
John G. Gary	Republican	1994–1998
Janet S. Owens	Democrat	1998–2006
John R. Leopold	Republican	2006–2013
Laura Neuman	Republican	2013–2014
Steve Schuh	Republican	2014–2018
Steuart Pittman	Democratic	2018–present

=== County Council ===
The County Council, as the legislative branch, adopts ordinances and resolutions, and has all of the county's legislative powers. The most recent county election occurred November 8, 2022. Members have four-year terms and are limited to three terms in a row.

Current County Board
Position	Name	Affiliation	District	Region
Member	Pete Smith	Democratic	1	Severn
Member	Allison Pickard	Democratic	2	Glen Burnie
Member	Nathan Volke	Republican	3	Pasadena
Chair	Julie Hummer	Democratic	4	Crownsville
Member	Amanda Fielder	Republican	5	Severna Park, Broadneck
Vice-chair	Lisa Brannigan Rodvien	Democratic	6	Annapolis
Member	Shannon Leadbetter	Republican	7	Gambrillis/Crofton/Davidsonville/Edgewater

=== Law enforcement ===
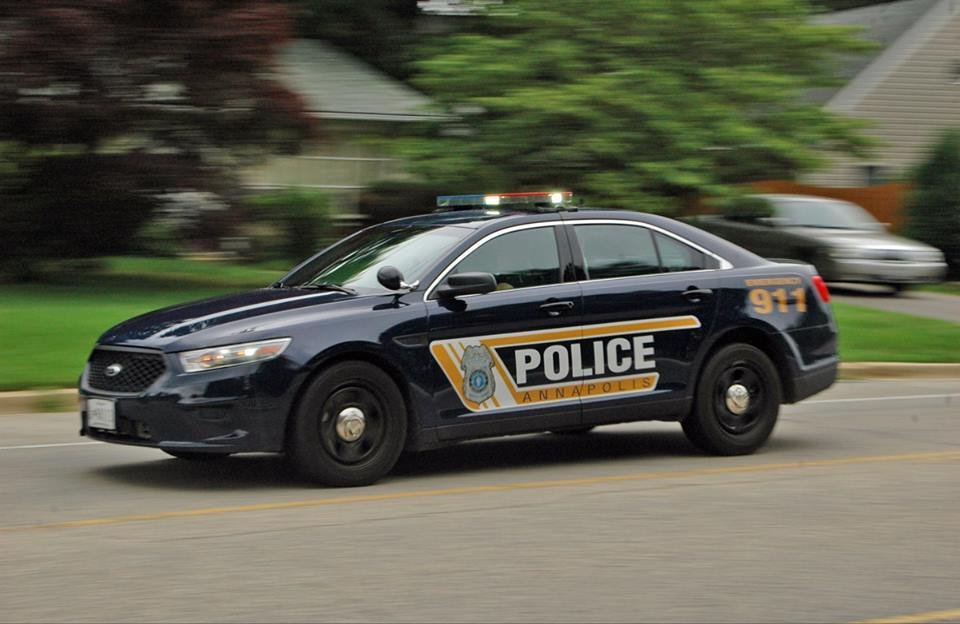
The Annapolis Police Department covers the City of Annapolis.

Several major law enforcement agencies serve Anne Arundel County:

- Anne Arundel County Police Department is headed by Chief Amal Awad.
- Anne Arundel County Sheriff's Office is headed by Sheriff Everett Sesker.
- Annapolis Police Department
- Maryland State Police
- Maryland Natural Resources Police
- Maryland Transportation Authority Police
- Maryland Transit Administration Police
- Anne Arundel County Department of Detention Facilities

=== Federal representation ===
In the 119th Congress, Anne Arundel County is represented in the U.S. House of Representatives by Sarah Elfreth (D) of the 3rd district, and Steny Hoyer (D) of the 5th district.

== Demographics ==
Historical population
Census	Pop.	Note	%±
1790	22,598		—
1800	22,623		0.1%
1810	26,668		17.9%
1820	27,165		1.9%
1830	28,295		4.2%
1840	29,532		4.4%
1850	32,393		9.7%
1860	23,900		−26.2%
1870	24,457		2.3%
1880	28,526		16.6%
1890	34,094		19.5%
1900	39,620		16.2%
1910	39,553		−0.2%
1920	43,408		9.7%
1930	55,167		27.1%
1940	68,375		23.9%
1950	117,392		71.7%
1960	206,634		76.0%
1970	297,539		44.0%
1980	370,775		24.6%
1990	427,239		15.2%
2000	489,656		14.6%
2010	537,656		9.8%
2020	588,261		9.4%
2025 (est.)	603,380	▲	2.6%
U.S. Decennial Census; 1790-1960 1900–1990; 1990–2000 2010 2020

=== Racial and ethnic composition ===
Anne Arundel County, Maryland – Racial and ethnic composition Note: the US Census treats Hispanic/Latino as an ethnic category. This table excludes Latinos from the racial categories and assigns them to a separate category. Hispanics/Latinos may be of any race.
Race / Ethnicity (NH = Non-Hispanic)	Pop 1980	Pop 1990	Pop 2000	Pop 2010	Pop 2020	% 1980	% 1990	% 2000	% 2010	% 2020
White alone (NH)	318,161	361,609	390,519	389,386	367,893	85.81%	84.64%	79.75%	72.42%	62.54%
Black or African American alone (NH)	42,428	49,954	65,755	81,819	102,555	11.44%	11.69%	13.43%	15.22%	17.43%
Native American or Alaska Native alone (NH)	699	1,222	1,339	1,365	1,178	0.19%	0.29%	0.27%	0.25%	0.20%
Asian alone (NH)	4,196	7,471	11,110	18,154	25,187	1.13%	1.75%	2.27%	3.38%	4.28%
Native Hawaiian or Pacific Islander alone (NH)	x	x	271	392	411	x	x	0.06%	0.07%	0.07%
Other race alone (NH)	696	168	670	880	3,118	0.19%	0.04%	0.14%	0.16%	0.53%
Mixed race or Multiracial (NH)	x	x	7,090	12,758	31,123	x	x	1.45%	2.37%	5.29%
Hispanic or Latino (any race)	4,595	6,815	12,902	32,902	56,796	1.24%	1.60%	2.63%	6.12%	9.65%
Total	370,775	427,239	489,656	537,656	588,261	100.00%	100.00%	100.00%	100.00%	100.00%

=== 2020 census ===
As of the 2020 census, the county had a population of 588,261. The median age was 38.8 years. 22.5% of residents were under the age of 18 and 15.3% of residents were 65 years of age or older. For every 100 females there were 96.1 males, and for every 100 females age 18 and over there were 93.9 males age 18 and over. 92.5% of residents lived in urban areas, while 7.5% lived in rural areas.

The racial makeup of the county was 64.2% White, 17.8% Black or African American, 0.4% American Indian and Alaska Native, 4.3% Asian, 0.1% Native Hawaiian and Pacific Islander, 4.8% from some other race, and 8.4% from two or more races. Hispanic or Latino residents of any race comprised 9.7% of the population.

There were 219,971 households in the county, of which 32.6% had children under the age of 18 living with them and 25.9% had a female householder with no spouse or partner present. About 24.4% of all households were made up of individuals and 9.3% had someone living alone who was 65 years of age or older.

There were 233,130 housing units, of which 5.6% were vacant. Among occupied housing units, 71.9% were owner-occupied and 28.1% were renter-occupied. The homeowner vacancy rate was 1.2% and the rental vacancy rate was 6.5%.

=== 2010 census ===
As of the 2010 United States census, 537,656 people, 199,378 households, and 139,262 families were residing in the county. The population density was 1,295.9/sq mi (500.3/km^{2}). The 212,562 housing units had an average density of 512.3/sq mi (197.8/km^{2}). The racial makeup of the county was 75.4% White, 15.5% Black or African American, 3.4% Asian, 0.3% American Indian, 0.1% Pacific Islander, 2.4% from some other race, and 2.9% from two or more races. Those of Hispanic or Latino origin made up 6.1% of the population. In terms of ancestry, 23.3% were German, 18.6% were Irish, 12.3% were English, 7.4% were Italian, 5.0% were Polish, and 4.4% were American.

Of the 199,378 households, 34.6% had children under 18 living with them, 53.1% were married couples living together, 12.1% had a female householder with no husband present, 30.2% were not families, and 23.7% of all households were made up of individuals. The average household size was 2.63, and the average family size was 3.11. The median age was 38.4 years.

The median income for a household in the county was $83,456 and for a family was $97,557. Males had a median income of $63,187 versus $48,750 for females. The per capita income for the county was $38,660. About 3.3% of families and 5.3% of the population were below the poverty line, including 6.9% of those under age 18 and 5.5% of those age 65 or over.

=== 2000 census ===
As of the census of 2000, 489,656 people, 178,670 households, and 129,178 families were residing in the county. The population density was 1,177 people/sq mi. There were 186,937 housing units with an average density of 449 per square mile (173/km^{2}). The racial makeup of the county was 81.24% White, 13.57% Black or African American, 0.30% Native American, 2.29% Asian, 0.06% Pacific Islander, 0.85% from other races, and 1.69% from two or more races. About 2.63% of the population were Hispanic or Latino of any race; 17.7% were of German, 13.1% Irish, 10.5% English, 8.1% United States or American, and 7.0% Italian ancestry.

Of the 178,670 households, 34.9% had children under 18 living with them, 57.2% were married couples living together, 11.1% had a female householder with no husband present, and 27.7% were not families. About 21.3% of all households were made up of individuals, and 6.4% had someone living alone who was 65 or older. The average household size was 2.65, and the average family size was 3.09.

In the county, the age distribution was 25.2% under 18, 8.10% from 18 to 24, 32.8% from 25 to 44, 23.9% from 45 to 64, and 10.0% who were 65 or older. The median age was 36 years. For every 100 females, there were 99.10 males. For every 100 females age 18 and over, there were 97.10 males.

== Economy ==
=== Principal employers ===
According to the Maryland Department of Business and Economic Development, the following were the principal employers in the county in November 2014 (excluding U.S. post offices and state and local governments, but including public institutions of higher education).

Employer	Employees
Fort George G. Meade (including the National Security Agency)	53,733
Northrop Grumman	7,725
Anne Arundel Health System	4,000
Southwest Airlines	3,200
Maryland Live! Casino	3,000
University of Maryland Baltimore Washington Medical Center	2,901
U.S. Naval Academy / Naval Support Activity	2,340
Walmart / Sam's Club	2,106
Booz Allen Hamilton	2,100
Anne Arundel Community College	1,849
Allegis Group	1,500
Computer Sciences Corporation	1,229
Giant Food	1,220
Target Corporation	1,050
Lockheed Martin	925
Verizon	844
L-3 Communications	818
Safeway	800
Food Lion	790
Rockwell Collins	773
AT&T Services	700
KEYW Corp.	683
TeleCommunication Systems	650
Johns Hopkins HealthCare	625
Shoppers Food Warehouse	625
Under Armour	617
Maryland Jockey Club / Laurel Park	616
Navy Enterprise Resource Planning	600
Ciena	600
United States Coast Guard Yard	598
The Home Depot	597

=== Personal income ===
In 2000, the median income for a household in the county was $61,768, and the median income for a family was $69,019 (these figures had risen to $79,294 and $91,071 respectively as of a 2007 estimate). Males had a median income of $43,747 versus $32,348 for females. The per capita income for the county was $27,578. About 3.60% of families and 5.10% of the population were below the poverty line, including 6.30% of those under age 18 and 5.80% of those age 65 or over.

=== State government ===
Several state agencies are headquartered in unincorporated areas in Anne Arundel County. Executive departments include the Department of Agriculture, the Aviation Administration, the Department of Housing and Community Development, and the Department of Transportation. The Rural Maryland Council, an independent agency, is also headquartered in an unincorporated area in the county.

=== State correctional facilities ===
The Maryland House of Correction, operated by the Maryland Department of Public Safety and Correctional Services, was located in Anne Arundel County. The prison was closed in 2007.

The Maryland Department of Public Safety and Correctional Services operates several additional correctional facilities in the unincorporated town of Jessup in Anne Arundel County, including:

- Brockbridge Correctional Facility
- Jessup Correctional Institution
- Jessup Pre-Release Unit
- Maryland Correctional Institution – Jessup
- Maryland Correctional Institution for Women

=== District of Columbia facilities ===
The District of Columbia Department of Youth Rehabilitation Services (DYRS) operates the New Beginnings Youth Development Center, a secure youth prison, in the county. Oak Hill Youth Center, the previous DYRS secure facility, was also in the county.

=== U.S. Department of Defense facilities ===
Fort George G. Meade is a large U.S. Army post located in the northwest of the county. It is the home of the National Security Agency.

The Naval Academy is located in Annapolis.

=== Healthcare ===
There are two full-service hospitals in Anne Arundel County: Anne Arundel Medical Center in Annapolis and Baltimore Washington Medical Center (formerly North Arundel Hospital) in Glen Burnie, part of the University of Maryland Medical System.

== Media ==
- The newspapers of record are The Capital and the Maryland Gazette (now owned by The Capital), which was founded in 1727.

== Education ==
- Children are educated by the Anne Arundel County Public Schools, which cover the entire county.
- Postsecondary education is offered by Anne Arundel Community College at several locations throughout the county.
- Anne Arundel County is also home to the United States Naval Academy and St. John's College, U.S., both in Annapolis.

== Transportation ==
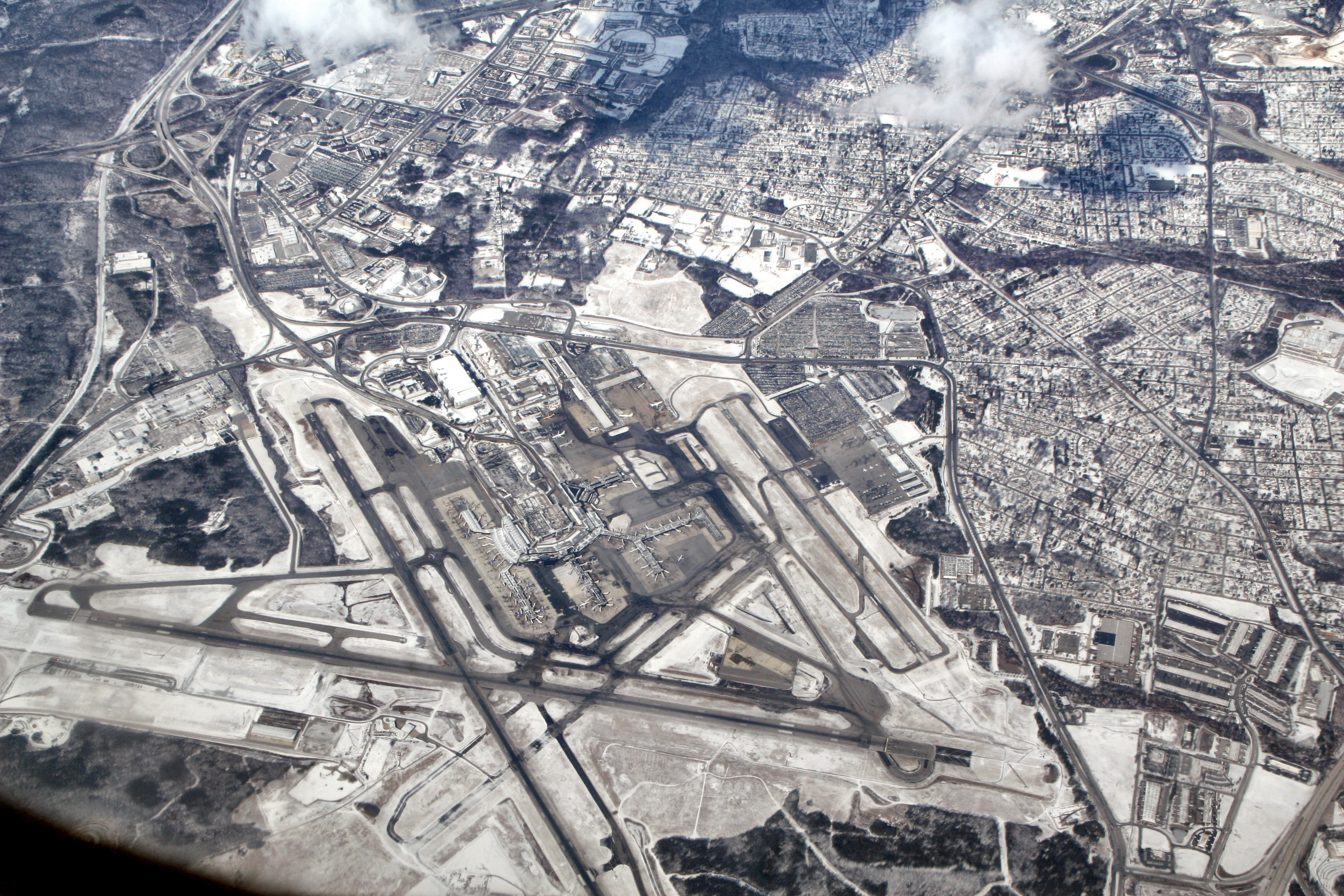
Baltimore/Washington International Thurgood Marshall Airport (BWI) is located in Anne Arundel County

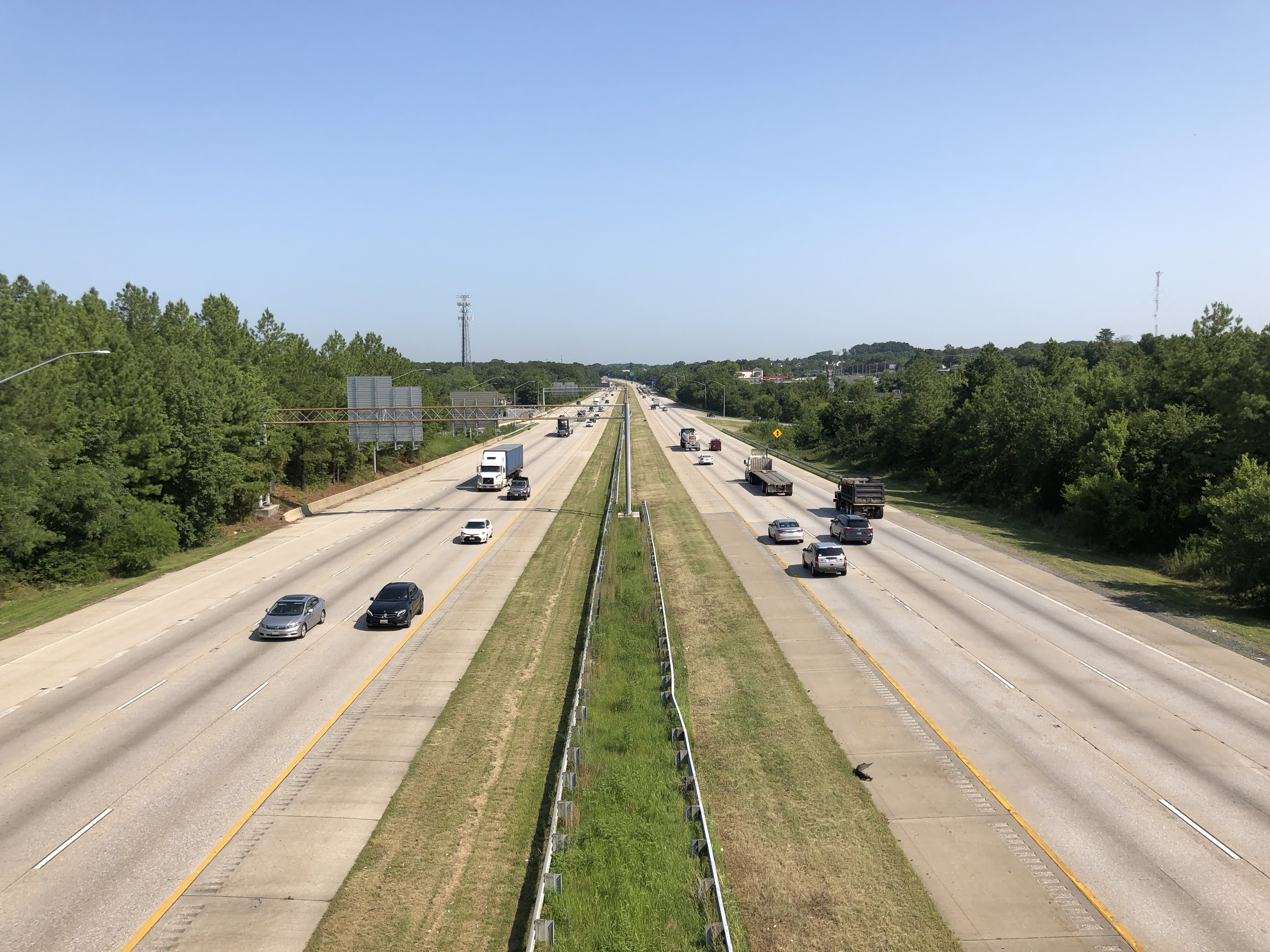
I-97 northbound at Benfield Boulevard in Anne Arundel County

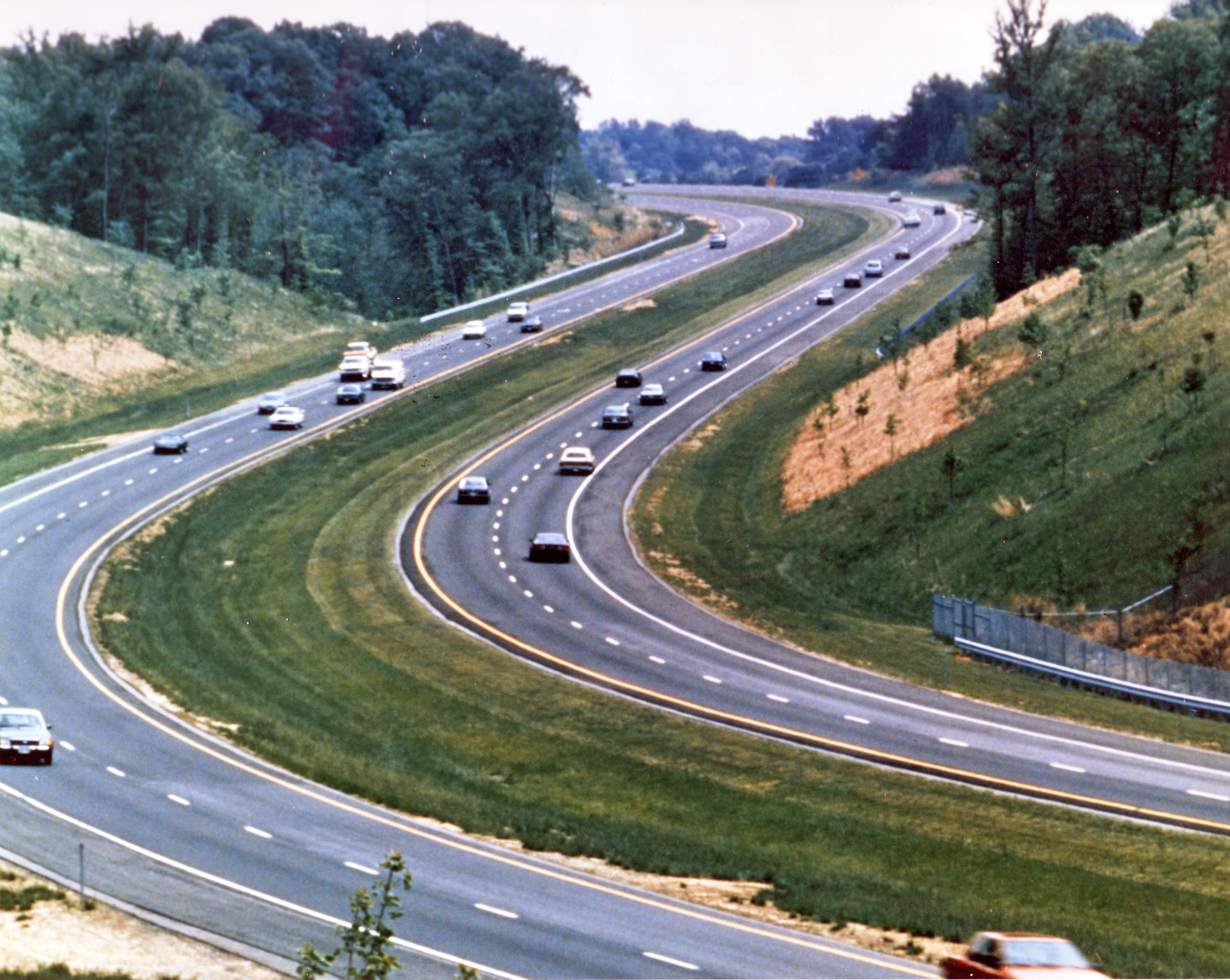
Interstate 97 in 1990

Anne Arundel County is the home of Baltimore-Washington International Thurgood Marshall Airport, commonly referred to as BWI. BWI serves as the main airport for the metropolitan Baltimore region. It is also an increasingly popular alternative airport to residents of the Washington, D.C., area. BWI is an East Coast hub for Southwest Airlines, meaning that nonstop flights are available between BWI and much of the country.

The southern portion of the Maryland Transit Administration's Light Rail system, connecting downtown Baltimore with BWI, runs through the northern part of Anne Arundel County.

The county also has multiple stops on the MARC commuter rail service, including a stop at BWI Rail Station, located near BWI Airport. Amtrak trains also stop at BWI's train station.

The Laurel-based Connect-a-ride system operates two routes in the western portion of the county, including Severn, Arundel Mills, Maryland City, Glen Burnie, Hanover, and Odenton. Howard County's Howard Transit Silver route serves Arundel Mills shopping mall and BWI Airport.

=== Major roads and highways ===
- I-97
- I-195
- I-595
- I-695
- I-895
- US 50 / US 301
- MD 2
- MD 3
- MD 3 Bus.
- MD 4
- MD 10
- MD 32
- MD 100
- MD 295

== Recreation ==
=== Maryland Park Service ===
Sandy Point State Park is located at the end of the Broadneck peninsula near the west end of the Chesapeake Bay Bridge. It features a beach and marina and hosts many festivals and special events throughout the year. Helen Avalynne Tawes Garden is located at the Department of Natural Resources headquarters in Annapolis. The 5 acre garden features representations of the state's various geographic areas. The county also contains some of the easternmost portions of Patapsco Valley State Park, consisting of mostly undeveloped areas of forest and wetlands along the lower Patapsco River.

=== Anne Arundel Recreation and Parks ===
The Department of Recreation and Parks maintains "a comprehensive system of recreational programs for county residents and the preservation of valuable land," including indoor and outdoor sports facilities, community parks, green ways, archaeological, environmental, and historical preserves, and large regional facilities. Some of the major facilities include the Baltimore & Annapolis Trail, Downs Park, Jug Bay Wetlands Sanctuary, Fort Smallwood Park, Kinder Farm Park, and Quiet Waters Park.

Other attractions include the Maryland Renaissance Festival in Crownsville, the Maryland State House and the Colonial Annapolis Historic District.

Anne Arundel County is home to the two largest shopping malls in the State of Maryland: Westfield Annapolis Mall and Arundel Mills in Hanover in addition to Marley Station Mall in Glen Burnie. Adjacent to Arundel Mills is the Maryland Live! casino.

== Communities ==

Bracketed number refers to location on map

=== City ===
- Annapolis (23) (county seat)

=== Town ===
- Highland Beach (31)

=== Census-designated places ===
- Annapolis Neck (30)
- Arden on the Severn (18)
- Arnold (15)
- Brooklyn Park (32)
- Cape Saint Claire (21)
- Crofton (17)
- Crownsville (20)
- Deale (29)
- Edgewater (25)
- Ferndale (6)
- Fort Meade (2)
- Friendship
- Galesville
- Gambrills
- Glen Burnie (9)
- Herald Harbor (19)
- Jessup (1) (partly in Howard County)
- Lake Shore (13)
- Linthicum (7)
- Maryland City (3)
- Mayo (27)
- Naval Academy
- Odenton (16)
- Parole (22)
- Pasadena (10)
- Riva (24)
- Riviera Beach (12)
- Selby-on-the-Bay (26)
- Severn (4)
- Severna Park (14)
- Shady Side (28)

=== Unincorporated communities ===
- Beverly Beach
- Bristol
- Chestnut Hill Cove
- Churchton
- Davidsonville
- Fairhaven
- Germantown
- Gibson Island
- Green Haven (11)
- Hanover (partly in Howard County)
- Harmans
- Harundale
- Harwood
- Hillsmere Shores
- Jacobsville
- Londontowne (25)
- Lothian
- Millersville
- Orchard Beach
- Owensville
- Pumphrey (8)
- Riverdale
- Rose Haven
- Russett
- Sherwood Forest
- South Gate (5)
- Sudley
- Tracys Landing
- Waysons Corner
- West River
- Winchester-on-the-Severn
- Woodland Beach

== Notable people ==
- Brady Barr, herpetologist and television host
- Steve Bisciotti, owner of the Baltimore Ravens
- Peter Bondra, ice hockey player
- Tamar Braxton, entertainer
- Toni Braxton, entertainer
- Josh Hader, baseball player
- Jeff Hatch, football player
- Gerard T. Hopkins, Quaker religious leader and uncle of Johns Hopkins
- Johns Hopkins, philanthropist and founder of Johns Hopkins University
- Craig Laughlin, ice hockey player and broadcaster
- Ronald Malfi, author
- Jackson Merrill, baseball player
- Travis Pastrana, motosports competitor
- Pat Sajak, entertainer
- Mark Teixeira, baseball player
- Steve Wojciechowski, basketball player and coach

== See also ==
- National Register of Historic Places listings in Anne Arundel County, Maryland
