= Severn Run High School =

Location
- 8065 New Cut Rd; Severn, Maryland 21108; United States
- 39.1220°N 76.6425°W

Information
- Type: Public high school
- Motto: One Wolf Pack
- Established: 2024
- School district: Anne Arundel County Public Schools
- Principal: Rachel Kennelly
- Grades: 9–12
- Enrollment: 1,608 (2024–2025)
- Campus type: Large suburb
- Colors: Blue, orange, and white
- Athletics conference: MPSSAA
- Mascot: Wolves
- Rival: Old Mill High School
- Website: www.severnrunhs.org

Severn Run High School is a public high school in Severn, Maryland, administered by Anne Arundel County Public Schools. The school opened in 2024 to mitigate overcrowding in the Old Mill, Glen Burnie, North County and Meade feeder systems.

Severn Run High School has two feeder middle schools: Old Mill Middle School North in Millersville, and MacArthur Middle School in Fort Meade. All students attending Old Mill Middle School North attend Severn Run for high school. However, MacArthur Middle School is on a split articulation system. Students attending MacArthur Middle School may or may not attend Severn Run High School, depending on the elementary school they are zoned for. MacArthur Middle School students living in the attendance areas for Frank Hebron-Harman and Van Bokkelen Elementary Schools attend Severn Run for high school, while all other students at MacArthur Middle School attend Meade High School.

The feeder covers Crownsville, Gambrills, Millersville, and Severn along with parts of Crofton, Annapolis, and Hanover as well.
