= Severn, Maryland =

Severn
- Census-designated place
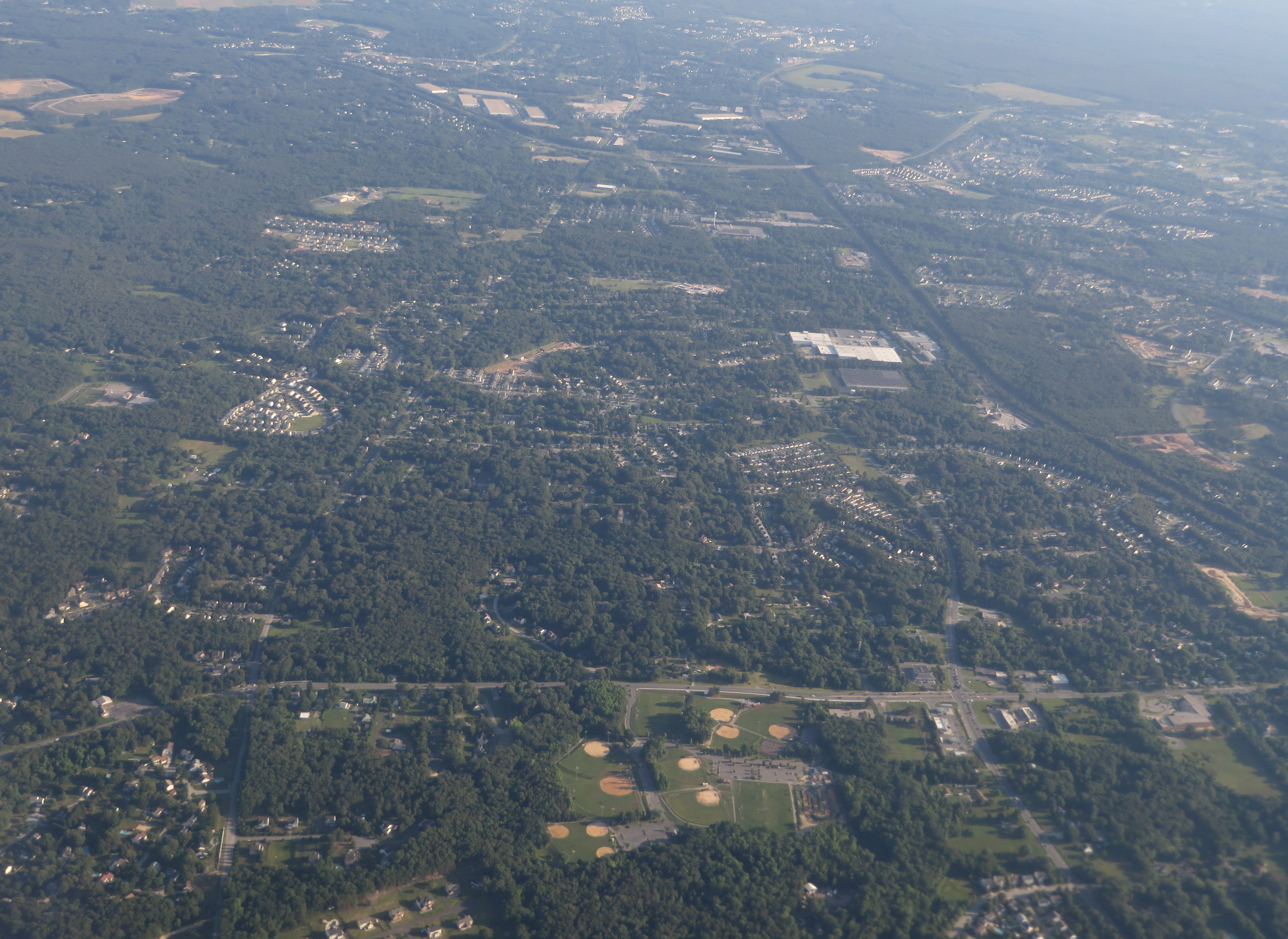
- 2014 aerial photo of Severn

- Location of Severn, Maryland
- Coordinates: 39°7′58″N 76°41′38″W
- Country: United States
- State: Maryland
- County: Anne Arundel

Area
  - Total: 18.34 sq mi (47.50 km^{2})
  - Land: 18.34 sq mi (47.50 km^{2})
  - Water: 0 sq mi (0.00 km^{2})
- Elevation: 161 ft (49 m)

Population (2020)
  - Total: 57,118
  - Density: 3,114.4/sq mi (1,202.48/km^{2})
- Time zone: UTC−5 (EST)
  - Summer (DST): UTC−4 (EDT)
- ZIP code: 21144
- Area codes: 410, 443, and 667
- FIPS code: 24-71150
- GNIS feature ID: 0591249

Severn is a census-designated place (CDP) in Anne Arundel County, Maryland, United States. According to the 2020 U.S. census, the population of Severn is 57,118, a 22.6% increase from 44,231 in 2010. The zip code is 21144.

== Geography ==
Severn is located at 39°7′58″N 76°41′38″W (39.132841, −76.694002) in northwestern Anne Arundel County. It is bordered by Hanover to the north, Glen Burnie to the east, Odenton and Millersville to the south, and Fort George G. Meade to the west. The Baltimore–Washington Parkway (Maryland Route 295) forms the northwestern edge of the CDP, Maryland Route 176 (Dorsey Road) forms the northern edge, and Interstate 97 forms the eastern edge. Part of the southern boundary of the CDP is formed by the non-tidal portion of the Severn River. The Maryland Route 100 freeway runs through the northern part of the CDP, connecting the B-W Parkway and I-97.

According to the United States Census Bureau, the CDP has a total area of 17.7 square miles (45.9 km^{2}), all of it land.

Severn is also represented at the County Council level by Pete Smith.

=== Climate ===
Climate data for Severn, MD
Month	Jan	Feb	Mar	Apr	May	Jun	Jul	Aug	Sep	Oct	Nov	Dec	Year
Mean daily maximum °F (°C)	42 (6)	45 (7)	54 (12)	65 (18)	74 (23)	82 (28)	86 (30)	84 (29)	77 (25)	67 (19)	56 (13)	46 (8)	65 (18)
Mean daily minimum °F (°C)	27 (−3)	29 (−2)	36 (2)	45 (7)	55 (13)	63 (17)	68 (20)	66 (19)	59 (15)	48 (9)	39 (4)	32 (0)	47 (8)
Source: WeatherSpark

== Demographics ==
Historical population
Census	Pop.	Note	%±
1980	20,147		—
1990	24,499		21.6%
2000	35,076		43.2%
2010	44,231		26.1%
2020	57,118		29.1%

=== Racial and ethnic composition ===
Severn CDP, Maryland – Racial and ethnic composition Note: the US Census treats Hispanic/Latino as an ethnic category. This table excludes Latinos from the racial categories and assigns them to a separate category. Hispanics/Latinos may be of any race.
Race / Ethnicity (NH = Non-Hispanic)	Pop 2000	Pop 2010	Pop 2020	% 2000	% 2010	% 2020
White alone (NH)	19,106	21,538	21,933	54.47%	48.69%	38.50%
Black or African American alone (NH)	11,943	14,524	19,321	34.05%	32.84%	33.83%
Native American or Alaska Native alone (NH)	138	112	134	0.39%	0.25%	0.23%
Asian alone (NH)	1,492	3,429	5,678	4.25%	7.75%	9.94%
Native Hawaiian or Pacific Islander alone (NH)	32	55	47	0.09%	0.12%	0.08%
Other race alone (NH)	91	104	346	0.26%	0.24%	0.61%
Mixed race or Multiracial (NH)	884	1,694	3,515	2.52%	3.83%	6.15%
Hispanic or Latino (any race)	1,390	2,775	6,084	3.96%	6.27%	10.65%
Total	35,076	44,231	57,118	100.00%	100.00%	100.00%

=== 2020 census ===
As of the 2020 census, Severn had a population of 57,118. The median age was 36.4 years. 22.9% of residents were under the age of 18 and 11.6% of residents were 65 years of age or older. For every 100 females there were 96.1 males, and for every 100 females age 18 and over there were 93.9 males age 18 and over.

100.0% of residents lived in urban areas, while 0.0% lived in rural areas.

There were 20,944 households in Severn, of which 33.9% had children under the age of 18 living in them. Of all households, 51.4% were married-couple households, 17.9% were households with a male householder and no spouse or partner present, and 24.6% were households with a female householder and no spouse or partner present. About 22.3% of all households were made up of individuals and 5.5% had someone living alone who was 65 years of age or older.

There were 21,939 housing units, of which 4.5% were vacant. The homeowner vacancy rate was 1.4% and the rental vacancy rate was 6.1%.

Racial composition as of the 2020 census
Race	Number	Percent
White	22,977	40.2%
Black or African American	19,660	34.4%
American Indian and Alaska Native	273	0.5%
Asian	5,738	10.0%
Native Hawaiian and Other Pacific Islander	50	0.1%
Some other race	2,866	5.0%
Two or more races	5,554	9.7%

=== 2021 estimates ===
In 2021, ACS estimated that 53,955 people lived in Severn, the racial breakdown of which is 46.8% White alone, 31.2% Black, 8.8% Asian, 7.6% Hispanic (of any race), 0.1% Native American, and 5.8% two or more races. The population density is 3,114.39 inhabitants per square mile (1,202.47/km^{2}).

It was also estimated (as of 2021) that there are 21,106 housing units in Severn, with an average density of 1,150.82 per square mile (444.33/km^{2}). The median household income is $115,481.

== Education ==
=== Public schools ===
Students who live in Severn may attend any public high school in the Anne Arundel County Public Schools district. The high school feeder districts in Severn include Glen Burnie High School, Old Mill High School, Severn Run High School, and Meade High School.

=== Private schools ===
- Annapolis Area Christian School
- Archbishop Spalding High School

== Notable residents ==
- Christopher Agorsor, soccer player
- Jessica Benson, singer
- The Braxtons (Toni, Traci, Towanda, Trina and Tamar, along with their brother Michael), singers and stars of Braxton Family Values
- Steve Dannenmann, accountant who gained fame as the 2005 World Series of Poker runner-up
- A. J. Francis, professional wrestler signed to Total Nonstop Action Wrestling, and former NFL defense tackle
- Marina Harrison, Miss Maryland 2003 and Miss Maryland USA 2005
- C. Edward Middlebrooks, politician
- Erin O'Donnell, singer
- Victor Sulin, politician
