= Fort Meade, Maryland =

- Census-designated place
- Location of Fort Meade, Maryland
- Coordinates: 39°6′18″N 76°44′29″W
- Country: United States
- State: Maryland
- County: Anne Arundel
- Named for: George Meade

Area
  - Total: 8.09 sq mi (20.96 km^{2})
  - Land: 8.08 sq mi (20.93 km^{2})
  - Water: 0.012 sq mi (0.03 km^{2})
- Elevation: 180 ft (55 m)

Population (2020)
  - Total: 9,324
  - Density: 1,153.6/sq mi (445.42/km^{2})
- Time zone: UTC−5 (Eastern (EST))
  - Summer (DST): UTC−4 (EDT)
- ZIP code: 20755
- Area code: 410
- FIPS code: 24-29400

Fort Meade is a census-designated place (CDP) in Anne Arundel County, Maryland, United States. The population was 9,324 at the 2020 census. It is the home to the National Security Agency, Central Security Service, United States Cyber Command and the Defense Information Systems Agency, which are located on the U.S. Army post Fort George G. Meade.

== Geography ==
Fort Meade is located at 39°6′18″N 76°44′29″W (39.105015, −76.741260) in northwestern Anne Arundel County. It is located between the cities of Baltimore and Washington, D.C., and is located approximately 20 minutes from the state capital of Annapolis. It is bounded on the northwest by the Baltimore–Washington Parkway (Maryland Route 295) and on the south and southwest by the Patuxent Freeway (Maryland Route 32), which leads southeast towards Annapolis and northwest to Columbia. Exit 38A off Interstate 95 (in adjacent Howard County) also offers access to here.

== Adjacent CDPs and communities ==
- Annapolis Junction
- Hanover
- Jessup
- Laurel
- Linthicum
- Maryland City
- Odenton
- Patuxent Research Refuge
- Seven Oaks
- Severn

== Bedroom towns ==
- Columbia
- Crofton
- Crownsville
- Davidsonville
- Edgewater
- Elkridge
- Ellicott City
- Gambrills
- Glen Burnie
- Linthicum
- Parole (near Annapolis)
- Pasadena
- Savage
- Severna Park

== Climate ==
The climate in this area is characterized by hot, humid summers and generally mild to cool winters. According to the Köppen Climate Classification system, Fort Meade has a humid subtropical climate, abbreviated "Cfa" on climate maps.

== Demographics ==
Historical population
Census	Pop.	Note	%±
2000	9,882		—
2010	9,327		−5.6%
2020	9,324		0.0%
U.S. Decennial Census

=== 2020 census ===
As of the 2020 census, Fort Meade had a population of 9,324. The median age was 25.2 years. 33.4% of residents were under the age of 18 and 1.8% of residents were 65 years of age or older. For every 100 females there were 115.2 males, and for every 100 females age 18 and over there were 121.7 males age 18 and over.

100.0% of residents lived in urban areas, while 0.0% lived in rural areas.

There were 2,861 households in Fort Meade, of which 51.7% had children under the age of 18 living in them. Of all households, 62.5% were married-couple households, 20.1% were households with a male householder and no spouse or partner present, and 15.4% were households with a female householder and no spouse or partner present. About 17.5% of all households were made up of individuals and 1.0% had someone living alone who was 65 years of age or older.

There were 3,319 housing units, of which 13.8% were vacant. The homeowner vacancy rate was 11.6% and the rental vacancy rate was 12.0%.

Racial composition as of the 2020 census
Race	Number	Percent
White	5,033	54.0%
Black or African American	1,973	21.2%
American Indian and Alaska Native	68	0.7%
Asian	376	4.0%
Native Hawaiian and Other Pacific Islander	47	0.5%
Some other race	447	4.8%
Two or more races	1,380	14.8%
Hispanic or Latino (of any race)	1,594	17.1%

=== 2000 census ===
As of the census of 2000, there were 9,882 people, 2,432 households, and 2,307 families residing in the CDP. The population density was 1,500.5 inhabitants per square mile (579.3/km^{2}). There were 2,813 housing units at an average density of 427.1 per square mile (164.9/km^{2}). The racial makeup of the CDP was 62.46% White, 25.21% African American, 0.46% Native American, 2.98% Asian, 0.26% Pacific Islander, 3.58% from other races, and 5.06% from two or more races. Hispanic or Latino of any race were 9.55% of the population.

There were 2,432 households, out of which 78.7% had children under the age of 18 living with them, 81.0% were married couples living together, 10.6% had a female householder with no husband present, and 5.1% were non-families. 4.7% of all households were made up of individuals, and 0.2% had someone living alone who was 65 years of age or older. The average household size was 3.48 and the average family size was 3.58.

In the CDP, the population was spread out, with 38.9% under the age of 18, 16.8% from 18 to 24, 40.3% from 25 to 44, 3.7% from 45 to 64, and 0.3% who were 65 years of age or older. The median age was 23 years. For every 100 females, there were 110.8 males. For every 100 females age 18 and over, there were 114.2 males.

The median income for a household in the CDP was $40,661, and the median income for a family was $40,491. Males had a median income of $27,474 versus $22,165 for females. The per capita income for the CDP was $13,466. About 4.7% of families and 5.4% of the population were below the poverty line, including 5.6% of those under age 18 and none of those age 65 or over.

== Education ==
Anne Arundel County Public Schools operates public schools. Manor View Elementary School is located on Fort Meade. The MacArthur Manor development is zoned to Manor View. Manor View, serving grades 1–5, opened in 1977. Meade Heights Elementary School is also located on the property of Fort Meade. It serves Grades Pre-K–5 and opened in 1997. Pershing Hill Elementary School is also located on the Fort Meade property. Pershing Hill, serving grades 1–5, opened in 1960.

The West Meade Early Education Center (WMEEC) is located at Fort Meade, serves ECI, kindergarten, and pre-kindergarten students living in the attendance zones of Manor View, Pershing Hill, and the Former West Meade Elementary School. The redistricting for WMEEC was adopted on April 6, 2011. Students formerly zoned to West Meade Elementary were rezoned to Pershing Hill Elementary. The West Meade building first opened in 1964.

Portions of the property are zoned to MacArthur Middle School for middle school, and portions are zoned to Meade Middle School. MacArthur Middle School, serving grades 6–8, opened in 1967. Meade Middle School, serving grades 6–8, opened in 1997. All residents are zoned to Meade Senior High School for high school. Meade High School, serving grades 9–12, opened in 1977. The two middle schools and high school are also on-post.

== Transportation ==
The National Security Agency (NSA) maintains a shuttle service from the Odenton station of MARC to its Visitor Control Center at Fort Meade; it has done so since 2005. In 2009 the U.S. Army established a similar shuttle service from Odenton station to the Army section of Fort Meade; the NSA operates this service, allowing garrison employees, persons with Fort Meade visitor passes, and U.S. Department of Defense IDs to board.

== Notable people ==
- Randy Blythe (born 1971 in Fort Meade), vocalist for heavy metal band Lamb of God
- Peter David (born 1956 in Fort Meade), science fiction/fantasy author known for his comic book and Star Trek novel work
- Terren Jones (born 1991 in Fort Meade), NFL player
- Neal Stephenson (born 1959 in Fort Meade), speculative fiction writer
