= Anne Arundel County Public Schools =

School District serving Anne Arundel County Maryland

Address
- 2644 Riva Road Annapolis, Anne Arundel, Maryland, 21401; United States

District information
- Type: Public
- Grades: PreK–12
- Superintendent: Mark Bedell
- NCES District ID: 2400060

Students and staff
- Students: 84,452
- Teachers: 5,930.13
- Student–teacher ratio: 14.24

Other information
- Website: www.aacps.org

Anne Arundel County Public Schools is the public school district serving all of Anne Arundel County, Maryland. With over 85,000 students and 126 schools, the AACPS school system is the 4th largest in Maryland and the 39th largest in the United States. The district has over 5,000 teachers supporting a comprehensive curriculum from Pre-K through 12th grade.

== Schools ==
AACPS primarily consists of 79 elementary schools (Pre-K or K, through grade 5), 20 middle schools (grades 6–8), and 15 high schools (grades 9–12). AACPS maintains 2 centers of applied technology, 3 charter schools, 3 special education centers, 1 alternative high school, 1 middle school learning center, and 1 center for emotionally impaired students known as the Phoenix Center.

Many AACPS schools have garnered recognition for their academic programs, with appointment as National Blue Ribbon Schools of Excellence and Maryland Blue Ribbon Schools of Excellence. These schools are marked below with symbols representing their National-level and Maryland-level awards.

=== List of high schools ===
There are currently 15 high schools:

- Annapolis High School, Annapolis
- Arundel High School, Gambrills
- Broadneck High School, Annapolis
- Chesapeake High School, Pasadena
- Chesapeake Science Point, Hanover
- Crofton High School, Gambrills
- Glen Burnie High School, Glen Burnie
- Meade Senior High School, Fort Meade
- North County High School, Glen Burnie
- Northeast High School, Pasadena
- Old Mill High School, Millersville
- Severna Park High School, Severna Park
- South River High School, Edgewater
- Southern High School, Harwood
- Severn Run High School, Severn

=== List of middle schools ===
- Annapolis Middle School, Annapolis
- Arundel Middle School, Odenton
- Wiley H. Bates Middle School, Annapolis
- Brooklyn Park Middle School, Brooklyn Park
- Central Middle School, Edgewater
- Chesapeake Bay Middle School, Pasadena
- Chesapeake Science Point, Hanover
- Corkran Middle School, Glen Burnie
- Crofton Middle School, Gambrills
- Lindale Middle School, Linthicum
- MacArthur Middle School, Fort Meade
- Magothy River Middle School, Arnold
- Marley Middle School, Glen Burnie
- Meade Middle School, Fort Meade
- Northeast Middle School, Pasadena
- Old Mill Middle School North, Millersville
- Old Mill Middle School South, Millersville
- Severn River Middle School, Arnold
- Severna Park Middle School, Severna Park
- Southern Middle School, Lothian

=== Partial list of elementary schools ===
AACPS elementary schools serve students from Kindergarten to 5th grade. Some schools also offer a Pre-Kindergarten program for younger students who are "economically disadvantaged or homeless". Among AACPS's elementary schools are:

- Annapolis Elementary School, Annapolis
- Arnold Elementary School, Arnold
- Belle Grove Elementary School, Baltimore
- Belvedere Elementary School, Arnold
- Benfield Elementary School, Severna Park
- Bodkin Elementary School, Pasadena
- Broadneck Elementary School, Arnold
- Brock Bridge Elementary School, Laurel
- Brooklyn Park Elementary School, Brooklyn Park
- Cape St. Claire Elementary School, Annapolis
- Central Elementary School, Edgewater
- Crofton Elementary School, Crofton
- Crofton Meadows Elementary School, Crofton
- Crofton Woods Elementary School, Crofton
- Davidsonville Elementary School, Davidsonville
- Deale Elementary School, Deale
- Eastport Elementary School, Annapolis
- Edgewater Elementary School, Edgewater
- Folger McKinsey Elementary School, Severna Park
- Fort Smallwood Elementary School, Pasadena
- Four Seasons Elementary School, Gambrills
- Freetown Elementary School, Glen Burnie
- George Cromwell Elementary School, Glen Burnie
- Georgetown East Elementary School, Annapolis
- Germantown Elementary School, Annapolis
- Glen Burnie Park Elementary School, Glen Burnie
- Glendale Elementary School, Glen Burnie
- Hebron-Harman Elementary School, Hanover
- High Point Elementary School, Pasadena
- Hillsmere Elementary School, Annapolis
- Hilltop Elementary School, Glen Burnie
- Jacobsville Elementary School, Pasadena
- Jessup Elementary School, Jessup
- Jones Elementary School, Severna Park
- Lake Shore Elementary School
- Linthicum Elementary School, Linthicum
- Lothian Elementary School, Lothian
- Manor View Laurel Fort Meade
- Marley Elementary School, Glen Burnie
- Maryland City Elementary School, Laurel
- Mayo Elementary School, Edgewater
- Meade Heights Elementary School, Fort Meade
- Millersville Elementary School, Millersville
- Mills-Parole Elementary School, Annapolis
- Nantucket Elementary School, Crofton
- North Glen Elementary School, Glen Burnie
- Oak Hill Elementary School, Severna Park
- Odenton Elementary School, Odenton
- Overlook Elementary School, Linthicum
- Park Elementary School, Baltimore
- Pasadena Elementary School, Pasadena
- Pershing Hill Elementary School, Fort Meade
- Piney Orchard Elementary School, Odenton
- Point Pleasant Elementary School, Glen Burnie
- Quarterfield Elementary School, Severn
- Richard Henry Lee Elementary School, Glen Burnie
- Ridgeway Elementary School, Severn
- Rippling Woods Elementary School, Glen Burnie
- Riviera Beach Elementary School, Pasadena
- Rolling Knolls Elementary School, Annapolis
- Seven Oaks Elementary School, Odenton
- Severn Elementary School, Severn
- Severna Park Elementary School, Severna Park
- Shady Side Elementary School, Shady Side
- Shipley's Choice Elementary School, Severna Park
- Solley Elementary School, Glen Burnie
- Southgate Elementary School, Glen Burnie
- South Shore Elementary, Crownsville
- Sunset Elementary School, Pasadena
- Tracey’s Elementary School, Tracy's Landing
- Tyler Heights Elementary School, Annapolis
- Libertus Van Bokkelen Elementary School, Severn
- Waugh Chapel Elementary School, Odenton
- West Annapolis Elementary School, Annapolis
- Windsor Farm Elementary, Annapolis
- Woodside Elementary, Glen Burnie
- Two Rivers Elementary School, Odenton

=== Public charter and contract schools ===
Chesapeake Science Point (CSP) is a magnet school for math and science. The school was founded in 2003 by the volunteer non-profit Chesapeake Lighthouse Foundation (CLF), after the Charter School Law (Bill 75) was put into effect in July 2003, authorizing the establishment of charter schools in the state of Maryland. Admission to CSP is via an application and lottery basis.

Monarch Academy Glen Burnie (MAGB) is another charter school in Anne Arundel County. Monarch Academy serves students in Kindergarten through eighth grade. It employs Expeditionary Learning, a project based learning model, and is located in Glen Burnie.

Monarch Global Academy (MGA) is a contract school in Anne Arundel County. Monarch Global Academy serves students in Kindergarten through eighth grades. It employs the International Baccalaureate Primary Years Program in K–6 and a project based learning model in grades 6–8. It is located in Laurel, Maryland.

=== Other schools of note ===
- Center of Applied Technology North, Severn
- Center of Applied Technology South, Edgewater
- Mary E. Moss Academy, Crownsville
- Ruth Parker Eason School, Millersville – full-day special education
- Central Special School, Edgewater – full-day special education
- Phoenix Academy, Annapolis

== Leadership ==
AACPS headquarters are in the Parole census-designated place, near Annapolis. The Carol S. Parham Building houses the board of education, school support departments, professional support facilities, and meeting spaces.

The school system is governed by an eight-member board of education. Seven members of the board (representing each of the county's council districts) are elected to four-year terms (before 2018, these positions were appointed by the state governor), and one student member is voted to a one-year term by students in Magnet Programs or The AVID Program.

The board appoints a superintendent of schools to administer the school system. The current superintendent is Dr. Mark Bedell, who has served in this capacity since 2022. Previous superintendents include:

- Dr. George Arlotto (2014–2022)
- Mamie J. Perkins, interim superintendent (2013–2014)
- Dr. Kevin M. Maxwell, 11th superintendent (2006–2013)
- Nancy Mann, interim superintendent (2005–2006)
- Eric Smith (2002–2005)
- Ken Lawson, interim superintendent (2001–2002)
- Dr. Carol S. Parham (1993–2001)
- C. Berry Carter II (1992–1993)
- Larry L. Lorton (1988–1992)
- Robert Rice (1986–1988)
- Edward J. Anderson (1968–1986)
- David Jenkins (1946–1968)
- George Fox (1916–1946)

== Controversies ==
=== Pop-Tart controversy ===
Anne Arundel County Public Schools made headlines in March 2013 when school officials suspended 7-year-old Josh Welch for chewing a Pop-Tart pastry into a shape they thought resembled a gun and pretending to shoot his classmates. This was not the first time AACPS had dealt with this situation in that way, as 2 years earlier, a similarly aged student by the name of Sean House was suspended for the same reason. The Welch family, represented by attorney Robin Ficker, subsequently appealed to the district to have the two-day suspension removed from Josh's record, but the appeal was denied. The Welch family appealed the decision to the county school board, which upheld the suspension after a 2014 hearing. The Maryland State Board of Education also ruled to uphold the suspension. The suspension was again upheld in county circuit court in 2016, with an 11-page ruling that cited "the student's past history of escalating behavioral issues" and confirmed that "a suspension was appropriately used as a corrective tool". Shortly after this ruling, the parents' suit was closed by mediation in the Maryland Court of Special Appeals with an "undisclosed settlement". Officials at the school and the county maintained that "the case was never about a pastry or a gun, but rather an ongoing behavioral problem. They said that the boy disrupted the classroom repeatedly and that the suspension was a last resort."

=== Sex Education Curriculum ===
Sex education in AACPS had made headlines significant controversy, particularly regarding the inclusion of lessons on LGBTQ+ issues, gender identity, and sexual orientation. In response for LGBTQ+ rights, AACPS has made efforts to include more inclusive content in its sex education curriculum. However, this shift has faced resistance from some parents and community groups who argue that discussions on topics such as gender identity and same-sex relationships are inappropriate for children, particularly at the elementary and middle school levels. These parents contend that such lessons conflict with their personal or religious beliefs about sexuality.

== See also ==
- WYZT-LP
- List of school districts in Maryland
