= Center of Applied Technology South =

Vocational trade school in Edgewater, Maryland, US

Coordinates: 38.9217°N 76.5616°W

The Center of Applied Technology South, an Anne Arundel County Public School, is a vocational trade school located in the United States in Edgewater, Maryland, behind South River High School. It offers 17 technical and traditional programs.

== History ==
The Center of Applied Technology South (CAT-South) was founded in 1977.

== Vocational competitions ==
Technical Contests

- Advertising Design
- Architectural Drafting
- Automotive Refinishing Technology
- Automotive Service Technology
- Basic Health Care Skills
- Cabinetmaking
- Carpentry
- CNC Milling Technology
- CNC Turning Technology
- Collision Repair Technology
- Commercial Baking
- Computer Maintenance Technology
- Computer Technology
- Cosmetology
- Culinary Arts
- Dental Assisting
- Food and Beverage Service
- Heating, Ventilation, Air Conditioning and Refrigeration
- Industrial Motor Control
- Internetworking
- Marine Service Technology
- Mechatronics
- Medical Assisting
- Nail Care
- Nurse Assisting
- Practical Nursing
- Residential Wiring
- Robotics and Automation Technology
- Sheet Metal
- Technical Computer Applications
- Technical Drafting
- Web Design
- Welding Fabrication
- Welding

Occupational Contests

- Customer Service
- Entrepreneurship
- First Aid/CPR
- Health Knowledge Bowl
- Health Occupations Professional Portfolio
- Medical Math
- Medical Terminology
- Related Technical Math
