= Queenstown Rosenwald School =

- U.S. National Register of Historic Places
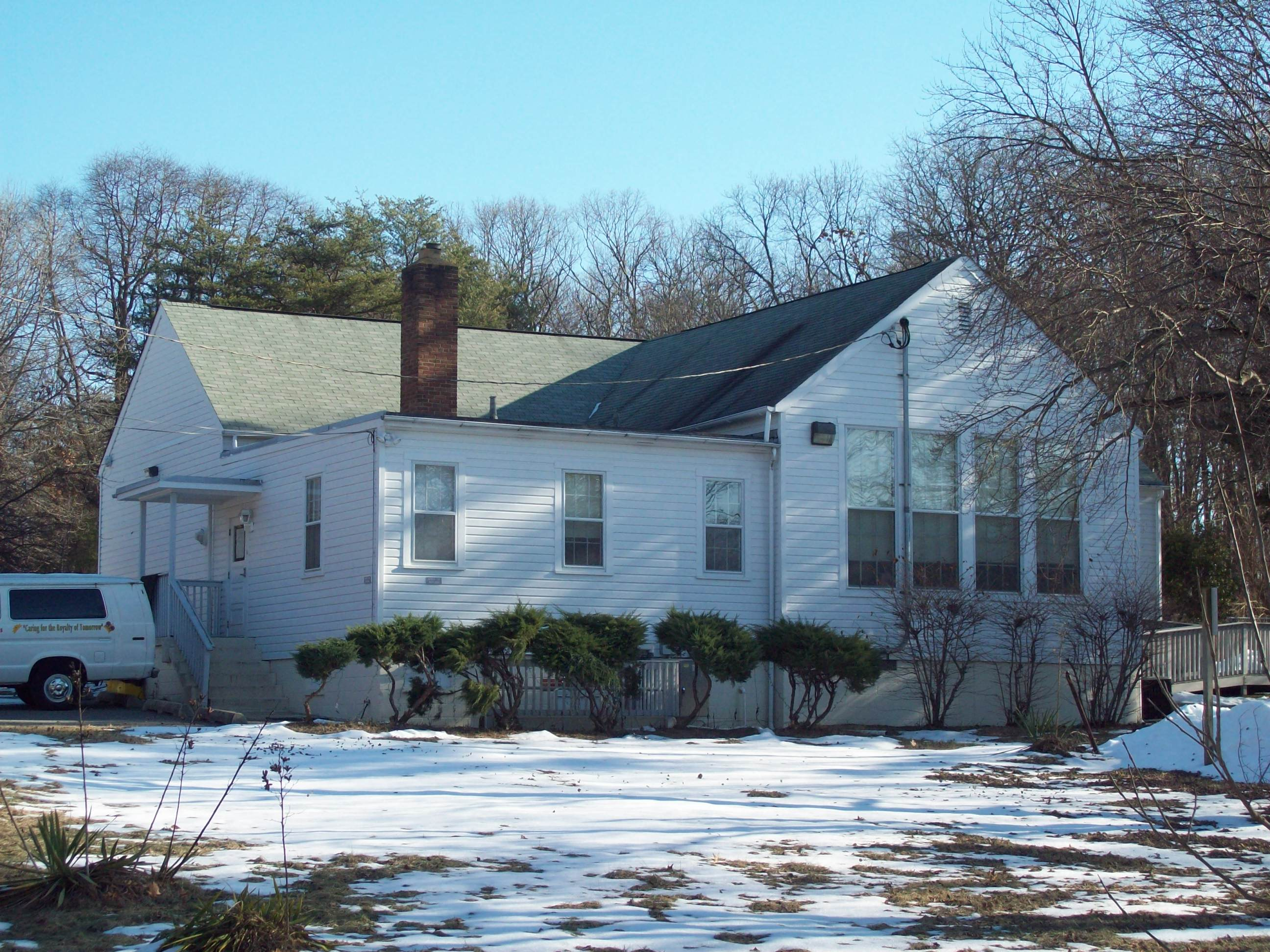
- Queenstown Rosenwald School, December 2009

- Location within Maryland Location within the United States
- Nearest city: 430 Queenstown Rd., Severn, Maryland
- Coordinates: 39°8′41.65″N 76°39′8.5″W
- Area: 1.5 acres (0.61 ha)
- Built: 1932
- Architectural style: Rosenwald School Plan
- MPS: Rosenwald Schools of Anne Arundel County, Maryland MPS
- NRHP reference No.: 09001060
- Added to NRHP: December 8, 2009

Queenstown Rosenwald School, also known as Sunnyside School, is a historic Rosenwald school building located at Severn in Anne Arundel County, Maryland, United States. It was built in 1932 and is a plain, one-story, frame building. The building contained two classrooms and a library. The school closed in 1966 and subsequently became the Queenstown Community Center.

It was listed on the National Register of Historic Places in 2009.

== See also ==
- Lula G. Scott Community Center
