= Connie Isler =

American golfer and golf coach

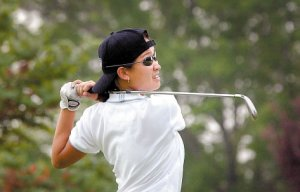
Isler at Ft. Meade, in her last tournament before entering Georgetown U.

Connie Isler (born December 16, 1983) is the youngest head coach in any NCAA Division I sport. In July 2005 at age 21, and two months after graduating from Georgetown University, the Georgetown Hoyas hired her to replace the resigning Leland Keyser as head coach of the women's golf team.

Under Isler's leadership, the Lady Hoyas are experiencing their greatest success ever in the 6-year history of the school's second-newest sport. They won two tournaments in 2005-06, at Campbell University and at home at the Hoya Invitational, and finished second in the Big East Championships.

Before landing the coaching position, Isler was interviewing for jobs in finance. She played on the Futures Tour in 2006, but missed the cut in all 10 events she played in.

Isler was co-Big East champion her senior year, and a star player at Meade Senior High School in Fort Meade, Maryland, prior to that. Her father is Ret. Gen. Rod Isler.
