= South River High School (Maryland) =

Location
- 201 Central Avenue East; Edgewater, Maryland; United States; 38.92166°N 76.55942°W

Information
- Type: Public high school
- Established: 1978; 48 years ago
- School district: Anne Arundel County Public Schools
- NCES School ID: 240006000055
- Principal: Stacey Smith
- Teaching staff: 100.60 FTE (2022-23)
- Grades: 9–12
- Gender: Co-educational
- Enrollment: 1,649 (2022-23)
- Student to teacher ratio: 16.39 (2022-23)
- Campus: Large suburb
- Colors: Columbia blue and silver
- Mascot: Seahawk
- Newspaper: The Current
- Yearbook: Tides
- Website: www.southriverhigh.org

South River High School is a public high school located in Edgewater, Maryland, United States, a suburb of the state capital, Annapolis. It lies directly next to Central Middle School. It was built in 1978 due to overcrowding at Arundel High School and Southern High School. It is the primary school for high school students from Edgewater, Mayo, Davidsonville, Riva, and a small portion of Harwood.

South River High School only has one feeder middle school, which is Central Middle School. Central Middle School has 4 feeder elementary schools: Central, Davidsonville, Edgewater, and Mayo.

The school received a Blue Ribbon in education for the 1997-1998 school year. In 2013, Newsweek ranked South River as one of the top 30 high schools in Maryland, and one of the top 1,000 in the country.

== Academics ==
=== STEM magnet program ===
South River features the STEM magnet program (Science, Technology, Engineering, and Mathematics). It was introduced in the fall of 2009, and students from other Anne Arundel County public high school districts can apply to the magnet program and attend South River if they get accepted by means of a lottery system and are assigned to a middle school that is included in South River’s STEM feeder system. South River is one of three high schools in Anne Arundel County featuring the STEM program, the others being North County High School in Glen Burnie and Glen Burnie High School (different schools) featuring the STEM/BMAH program.

== Athletics ==
South River competes in the Anne Arundel County Division of Maryland's 3A subdivision as of the 2023/2024 School Year.

South River has won many state championships, most recently in 2023 for soccer.

The field hockey team has won state championships in 2001, 2004, 2016 and 2017.

The baseball team won a state championship in 2013, their first state championship ever and only their third regional championship.

The football team won a county championship in the 2019-2020 season, going undefeated in the regular season. The Seahawks last appeared in the playoffs in 2019 losing in the 2nd round to their rival, the Arundel Wildcats.

The wrestling team won their first regional championship in 2017 and then in 2022 and 2023. In 2024, they lost the state final to Liganore High School.

The men's lacrosse team took its first state championship in 2009 winning 11-6 over Urbana High School after a regular season record of 17-1. The team continued its success with two more state championships in 2012 and 2014.

== Controversies ==
=== Suspension of football coach ===
On August 16, 2010, a South River student varsity football player suffered a serious back injury during a passing drill which confined the player to a wheelchair for at least six months. After another student alerted the school’s football coach Steve Erxleben of the injury, Erxleben instructed players to continue with practice, claiming the injury did not appear to be severe at the time. According to the player injured, Erxleben denied the student athlete ice and later watched as they were carried off the field by two teammates. According to a report following the incident, then-principal William Myers was alerted of the injury by the player’s father four days after the incident. Steve Erxleben was suspended from coaching at South River indefinitely on August 24, 2010 after failing to follow administrative practices reporting the incident. After an investigation that concluded before the season began, the Anne Arundel County Public Schools superintendent at the time, Kevin Maxwell, announced Erxleben would remain suspended for the first three games of the season until September 20, 2010 for failure to report the incident. In December 2010, Erxleben resigned from his coaching position at South River. He returned several years later and was named the Baltimore Ravens High School Coach of the Week of the 2021 fall season.

=== 2018 bathroom assault ===
On September 12, 2018, School Resource Officers and administration staff were made aware of a fight in one of the boy’s bathrooms where three students were assaulting another student. After the three students refused to stop, one School Resource Officer deployed oleoresin capsicum spray and began to arrest them. One female student entered the bathroom in an attempt to stop the arrest. The female student and the assaulter sprayed with oleoresin capsicum were taken to the hospital for decontamination. The three male juveniles were charged with second-degree assault, resisting arrest, and affray, while the female student was charged with hindering a lawful arrest, and disorderly conduct.
