= Odenton Town Center =

Unincorporated community in Maryland, United States

Coordinates: 39°5′27″N 76°42′19″W

The Odenton Town Center is a 1,620-acre (6.6 km^{2}) area of Odenton in Anne Arundel County, Maryland, designated in official plans for mixed-use development.

The Odenton Town Center has been planned as a Town Center since 1968. In 1990, legislation created an Odenton Growth Management Area (OGMA) to encourage development in the Town Center Area. In 1995, the Odenton Town Plan was adopted. In 2004, the updated Odenton Town Center Master Plan was adopted.

In July 2010, a Developer's Rights and Responsibilities Agreement (DRRA) was signed between The Halle Companies and Anne Arundel County, Maryland, which will allow the company to complete the stretch of Town Center Boulevard that connects the Seven Oaks Community with the Odenton MARC Station. In return, the County will be given the right to connect new water and sewer systems through the 128-acre parcel owned by The Halles. It has been reported that this is the final piece needed to allow the Odenton Town Center to move forward.

== Location overview ==
Odenton Town Center is the name given to the entire Odenton Growth Management Area. The OTC is a sixteen hundred and 20-acre (81,000 m^{2}) area, located in the western part of Anne Arundel County, Maryland. The plan is clearly centered on the Odenton MARC station, which draws overflow crowds of 2,100 riders for 1,300 parking spaces daily.
