= Edgewater, Maryland =

- Census-designated place
- Maryland State Route 2 (Solomons Island Road) at Virginia Avenue in Edgewater, June 2020

- Location within the U.S. state of Maryland Edgewater, Maryland (the United States)
- Coordinates: 38°56′14″N 76°33′30″W
- Country: United States
- State: Maryland
- County: Anne Arundel

Area
  - Total: 3.83 sq mi (9.92 km^{2})
  - Land: 2.99 sq mi (7.75 km^{2})
  - Water: 0.84 sq mi (2.17 km^{2})
- Elevation: 20 ft (6.1 m)

Population (2020)
  - Total: 9,446
  - Density: 3,157.0/sq mi (1,218.92/km^{2})
- Time zone: UTC−5 (Eastern (EST))
  - Summer (DST): UTC−4 (EDT)
- ZIP code: 21037
- Area code: 410
- FIPS code: 24-25050
- GNIS feature ID: 2583612

Edgewater is a census-designated place (CDP) in Anne Arundel County, Maryland, United States. The population was 9,023 at the 2010 census.

== Geography ==
Edgewater is a suburb located southwest of Annapolis on the south side of the tidal South River. It is bordered by Mayo to the east, Riva to the west, and Lothian to the south. To the north, across the South River, are the communities of Parole and Annapolis Neck.

Edgewater is often considered a suburb of Annapolis due to its proximity and development in the area. The area is steadily increasing with retail and residential development. Edgewater is part of the southern portion of Anne Arundel County. Londontown, Southdown, South River Colony, Glebe Heights, Gingerville and Edgewater Beach are some of the neighborhoods found in Edgewater.

== Demographics ==
Historical population
Census	Pop.	Note	%±
2010	9,023		—
2020	9,446		4.7%
U.S. Decennial Census

=== 2020 census ===
As of the 2020 census, Edgewater had a population of 9,446. The median age was 41.5 years. 21.0% of residents were under the age of 18 and 19.6% of residents were 65 years of age or older. For every 100 females there were 90.1 males, and for every 100 females age 18 and over there were 88.8 males age 18 and over.

100.0% of residents lived in urban areas, while 0.0% lived in rural areas.

There were 3,723 households in Edgewater, of which 29.9% had children under the age of 18 living in them. Of all households, 47.9% were married-couple households, 16.6% were households with a male householder and no spouse or partner present, and 28.6% were households with a female householder and no spouse or partner present. About 29.2% of all households were made up of individuals and 14.1% had someone living alone who was 65 years of age or older.

There were 3,940 housing units, of which 5.5% were vacant. The homeowner vacancy rate was 1.2% and the rental vacancy rate was 3.7%.

Racial composition as of the 2020 census
Race	Number	Percent
White	7,560	80.0%
Black or African American	258	2.7%
American Indian and Alaska Native	39	0.4%
Asian	251	2.7%
Native Hawaiian and Other Pacific Islander	3	0.0%
Some other race	481	5.1%
Two or more races	854	9.0%
Hispanic or Latino (of any race)	1,078	11.4%

== Transportation ==
Maryland Route 2 (Solomons Island Road) is the main north–south road through the community lined with businesses and residential developments, leading north across the South River Bridge to Annapolis and south to Prince Frederick and beyond. Maryland Route 214 (Central Avenue) intersects MD 2 and forms the southern boundary of the CDP leading east to the communities of Beverley Beach and Mayo. Maryland Route 253 (Mayo Road) curves through the center of the CDP in the Londontown neighborhood connecting Routes 2 and 214.

Lee Airport is a general aviation airport in Edgewater.

== Education ==
Edgewater is served by Anne Arundel County Public Schools.

These schools serve the Edgewater area:

- Central Elementary
- Edgewater Elementary
- Mayo Elementary
- Central Middle
- South River High School
- Center of Applied Technology South
- Central Special School
