= North County High School (Glen Burnie, Maryland) =

School in Glen Burnie, Maryland, US

Location
- 10 E. First Avenue; Glen Burnie, Anne Arundel County, MD 21061; United States; 39.1932°N 76.6374°W

Information
- Motto: Greatness is Within Every Knight
- Founded: 1990
- School district: Anne Arundel County Public Schools
- Principal: Eric Jefferson
- Staff: 152
- Grades: 9-12
- Enrollment: 2,130 (2022-2023)
- Colors: Red, Black, Silver
- Mascot: Knight
- Rival: Glen Burnie High School; South River High School
- Yearbook: Knight Life
- Website: School Homepage

North County High School (NCHS) is an Anne Arundel County Public Schools high school located in Glen Burnie, Maryland, United States. The school was established in 1990 as a result of the merger of Andover High School and Brooklyn Park High School. It later moved into the former Lindale Junior High School building, with Lindale moving to the former Andover site. The school mascot is the Knight and the school colors are silver, red and black, chosen by the school students and faculty of both Andover and Brooklyn Park High Schools. North County's rival is Glen Burnie High School. It is the primary high school for students living in Linthicum, Brooklyn Park, Ferndale, and portions of the Glen Burnie and Hanover areas.

North County High School has a rigorous STEM Magnet Program, and the IT3 (International Trade, Transportation, and Tourism) Signature Program. The school has a multitude of college course offerings such as Advanced Placement. North County became one of the campuses for Anne Arundel Community College in 2012.

In 2016, North County High School German teacher, Katrina Griffin, was named the 2017 National Language Teacher of the Year by the American Council on the Teaching of Foreign Languages.

== Sport programs ==
- Fall
  - Cheerleading
  - Cross Country
  - Field Hockey
  - Football
  - Golf
  - Soccer
  - Volleyball
- Winter
  - Basketball
  - Cheerleading
  - Indoor Track
  - Swimming
  - Wrestling
- Spring
  - Baseball
  - Lacrosse
  - Softball
  - Tennis
  - Track and Field

== Clubs/activities ==
North County High School offers varies after-school activity for students including:

=== Academic clubs ===
- American Computer Science League
- Cyber Patriot
- Don't Hate Collaborate
- Environmental Club
- Envirothon
- F.B.L.A
- German Honor Society
- It's Academic
- Key Club
- Math Team
- Mock Trial
- Model United Nations
- National Honor Society
- National Art Honor Society
- Science Olympiad
- Spanish Honor Society
- Student Government
- Technology Student Association
- Thai Club

=== Fine arts clubs ===
- Botball
- Drama club
- Gaming club
- Film club
- Literary magazine
- Multi-Ethnic Club
- Newspaper (Knightline)
- Stage crew
- Travel & tourism
- Yearbook
- Webmaster
- National Art Honor Society

=== Music clubs ===
- Band Boosters
- Chorus
- Concert band
- Guitar ensemble
- Jazz band
- Marching band
- Orchestra

== Notable alumni ==
- Dan Patrick (Andover High) – Texas Lt Governor
- Montel Williams (Andover High) – Television personality
- Jim Spencer (Andover High) – Major League Baseball player
- [Keith Mills] – (Brooklyn Park High) WBAL sports caster
- John C. Inglis (Andover High) – former deputy director of the National Security Agency
- Diane Black (Warren) (Andover High) US Congresswoman Tennessee
- Lloyd Keaser (Brooklyn Park High) – Wrestling Olympic silver medalist (1976) and world champion gold medalist (1973)
- Trevelin Queen – National Basketball Association player
- Terry R. Gilleland Jr. – Member of Maryland House of Delegates, May 20, 2003 to January 10, 2007
