= Odenton, Maryland =

Place in Maryland, United States

- Census-designated place
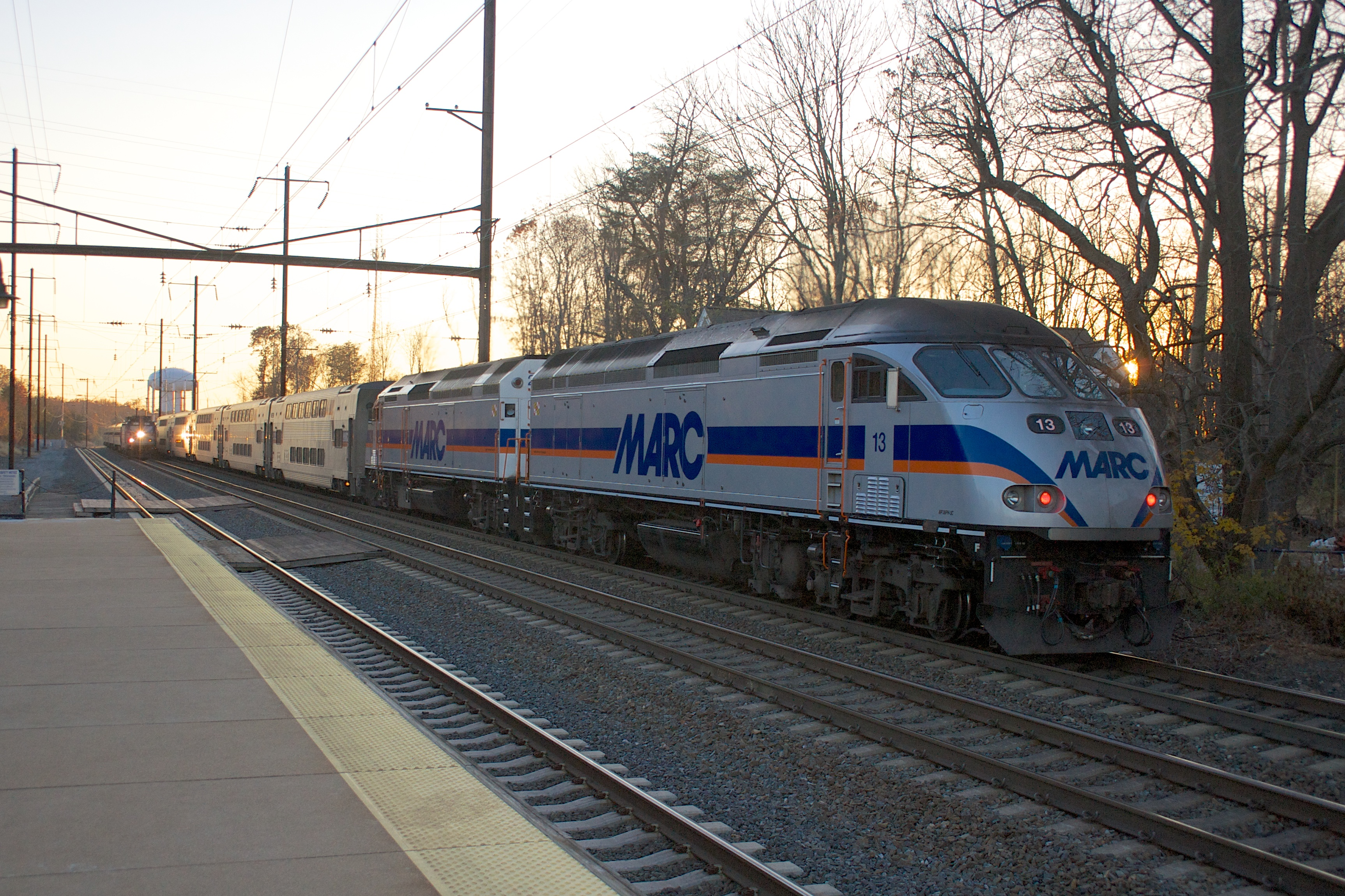
- A MARC Penn Line train pulls out of Odenton station while a Northeast Regional train pulled by an AEM-7 passes through
- Nickname: The city on the railroad
- Mottoes: The City a Railroad Built, The ever-growing city
- Location of Odenton in Anne Arundel County, Maryland (left) and in Maryland (right)
- Coordinates: 39°4′17″N 76°41′59″W
- Country: United States
- State: Maryland
- County: Anne Arundel
- Founded: 1868

Area
  - Total: 14.76 sq mi (38.24 km^{2})
  - Land: 14.76 sq mi (38.24 km^{2})
  - Water: 0 sq mi (0.00 km^{2})
- Elevation: 157 ft (48 m)

Population (2020)
  - Total: 42,947
  - Density: 2,908.7/sq mi (1,123.05/km^{2})
- Time zone: UTC−5 (Eastern (EST))
  - Summer (DST): UTC−4 (EDT)
- ZIP Code: 21113
- Area codes: 410, 443, 667
- FIPS code: 24-58300
- GNIS feature ID: 0590935

Odenton (/ˈoʊdəntən/ OH-dən-tən) is a census-designated place (CDP) in Anne Arundel County, Maryland, United States, located approximately 20 minutes from the state capital, Annapolis. The population was 42,947 as of the 2020 census, up from 37,132 at the 2010 census. Odenton is located west of Annapolis, south of Baltimore, and northeast of Washington, D.C.

In recent years, Odenton has become the fastest-growing city in the county with 2010 census numbers reporting 42% growth. This is because of its proximity to Fort George G. Meade, which contains NSA headquarters, U.S. Cyber Command (established 2009), and the Defense Information Systems Agency (moved to Fort Meade in 2011). Odenton's growth can also be attributed to it being centrally located between Annapolis, Baltimore, and Washington, D.C. The development has been fueled by the construction of the massive Piney Orchard development, progress in the ongoing development of Odenton Town Center, and construction of the NSA East Campus Integration Program scheduled for completion in 2028.

== History ==
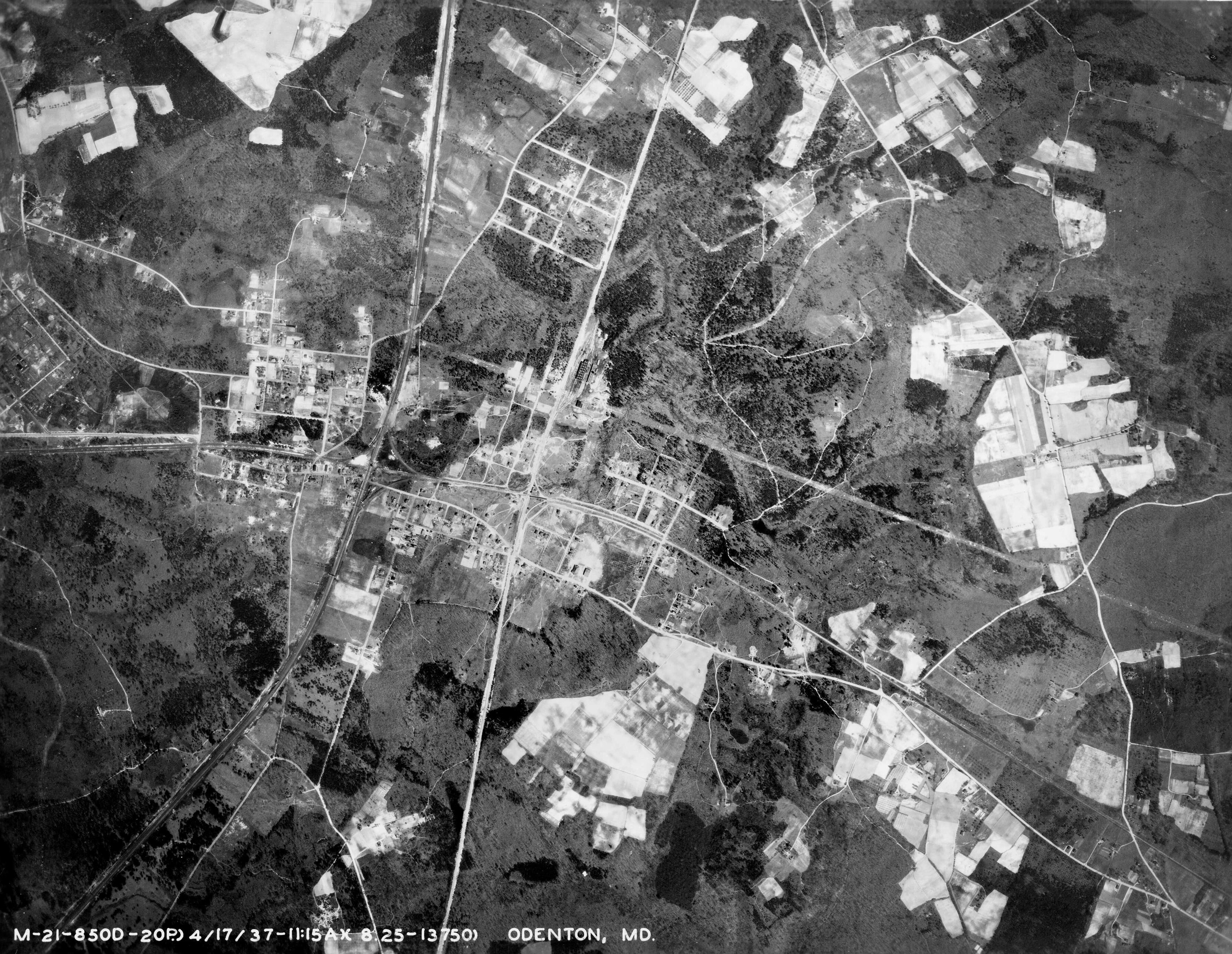
Aerial view, 1937

In 1840, the steam-powered Annapolis and Elk Ridge Railroad (A&ER) was built across a sparsely settled farming community that would later become Odenton. At the beginning of the Civil War, Union soldiers guarded this railroad line because it was the only link between the North and the nation's capital. Rail traffic through Baltimore had been disrupted by southern sympathizers, so supplies, mail and soldiers flowed through Annapolis and west Anne Arundel County to Washington.

The town of Odenton, nicknamed "The Town a Railroad Built" by Catherine L. O'Malley, was formed in 1868 with the construction of the Baltimore Potomac (B&P) Railroad connecting Baltimore and Washington, D.C. Where the B&P crossed the A&ER, a train station and telegraph office were constructed and named for Oden Bowie, president of the B&P and former governor of Maryland. Train service to the station began on July 2, 1872. The rail junction (today's MARC station) at Odenton Road, already a busy thoroughfare from Annapolis to Frederick, became the site of Odenton's first commercial center. The Watts and Murray general stores served railroad workers and farmers, and in 1871 a post office was established. A town grew near the junction, houses were built for railroad workers, a Methodist church was dedicated in 1891 and a grade school opened in 1892.

Small villages developed around these various railroad lines, but none amounted to more than a cluster of shops and homes around a train station and post office. The 1878 Maryland Directory listed the following towns: Conaway, Odenton, Patuxent, Sappington, and Woodwardville. Odenton was the largest, with a population of 100, a church, a school and two stores. In nearby Woodwardville, where the B&P crossed the Little Patuxent River, A. G. Woodward was the postmaster and operated a general merchandise store in a village of 50 people. Two churches and a school served that community. Land was worth from $5 and $30 per acre, producing wheat, corn and tobacco.

Canneries, primarily for tomatoes, were built in many locations in Anne Arundel County, including Odenton and Woodwardville. The George M. Murray Canning House, built in the late 19th century on Odenton Road (behind present day 1380 and 1382 Odenton Road) was a successful operation into the early 1900s.

Shortly after 1900, another company built an electric interurban railroad parallel to the B&P and also electrified the former A&ER. Train service on these lines began in 1908. The Washington, Baltimore and Annapolis Electric Railroad provided public transportation to central Maryland.

In 1914, the United States Naval Academy purchased the 800-acre (3.2 km^{2}) Hammond Manor Farm in neighboring Gambrills for the construction of a dairy following the 1910 typhoid fever outbreak at the academy. The academy operated the dairy until 1998. Until 2005 it was the home of Dean Foods' Horizon Organic dairy. The farm is currently the home of Maryland Sunrise Farm.

In 1917, at the advent of World War I, Odenton's growth was spurred by the establishment of Fort Meade. The United States Department of War acquired 19,000 acres (77 km^{2}) of land west of Odenton to develop a training camp, displacing numerous farmers, merchants and public and private enterprises, many of whom moved east to nearby Odenton. The Epiphany Chapel and Church House at Fort Meade was listed on the National Register of Historic Places in 2001. This growth accelerated in the 1950s with the establishment of the National Security Agency on the fort and Friendship International Airport (now the Baltimore-Washington International Thurgood Marshall Airport) a few miles to the north. Odenton still maintains its railroad history through the Dennis F. Sullivan Maintenance Facility, operated by Amtrak, which maintains track, bridges and other structures on the Amtrak/MARC line between Baltimore and Washington. All of this, as well as the suburban expansion of Baltimore and Washington, D.C., have transformed Odenton from a farmland region to a business, residential and industrial center in Anne Arundel County.

The Odenton Masonic Lodge No. 209 was listed on the National Register of Historic Places in 2022.

== Geography ==
Odenton is located at 39°04′17″N 76°41′59″W (39.071276, −76.699756).

According to the United States Census Bureau, the CDP has a total area of 14.8 square miles (38.3 km^{2}), all of it land.

It is bordered by Gambrills to the east, Severn to the north, Fort Meade to the west, and Crofton to the south. It is located at the intersection of Maryland routes 170 and 175 and is bordered by Route 32 to the north. The zipcode is 21113.

== Sports ==
=== Piney Orchard Ice Arena ===
From 1991 until their relocation to the Kettler Capitals Iceplex in Arlington County, Virginia in 2006, the Washington Capitals ice hockey team practiced at the Piney Orchard Ice Arena. After its renovation in 2017, Piney Orchard Ice Arena became the home ice for the Maryland Black Bears of the North American Hockey League. Tickets for the games are available online and at the box office. The team sells merchandise such as jerseys, hats, clothes and other items. Piney Orchard was also the practice facility for the Baltimore Skipjacks in the early 1990s.

== Demographics ==
Historical population
Census	Pop.	Note	%±
2000	20,534		—
2010	37,132		80.8%
2020	42,947		15.7%
U.S. Decennial Census

=== 2020 census ===
As of the 2020 census, Odenton had a population of 42,947. The median age was 36.5 years. 23.4% of residents were under the age of 18 and 12.5% of residents were 65 years of age or older. For every 100 females there were 90.6 males, and for every 100 females age 18 and over there were 87.1 males age 18 and over.

98.2% of residents lived in urban areas, while 1.8% lived in rural areas.

There were 17,111 households in Odenton, of which 32.9% had children under the age of 18 living in them. Of all households, 46.4% were married-couple households, 17.2% were households with a male householder and no spouse or partner present, and 30.2% were households with a female householder and no spouse or partner present. About 28.7% of all households were made up of individuals and 9.5% had someone living alone who was 65 years of age or older.

There were 18,026 housing units, of which 5.1% were vacant. The homeowner vacancy rate was 1.3% and the rental vacancy rate was 7.4%.

Racial composition as of the 2020 census
Race	Number	Percent
White	22,769	53.0%
Black or African American	11,787	27.4%
American Indian and Alaska Native	167	0.4%
Asian	2,584	6.0%
Native Hawaiian and Other Pacific Islander	56	0.1%
Some other race	1,195	2.8%
Two or more races	4,389	10.2%
Hispanic or Latino (of any race)	3,489	8.1%

=== Recent estimates ===
As of 2023, the median household income for Odenton overall was $126,455, and the median household income for families was $161,378. In 2019, 85.11% of Odenton residents spoke only English, 6.2% spoke Spanish, 4% spoke an Asian or Pacific Islander language, 3.4% spoke other Indo-European languages, and 1.5% spoke other languages.

=== 2010 census ===
As of the 2010 census the racial makeup of the CDP was 65.28% White, 23.02% African American, 0.4% Native American, 5.48% Asian/Pacific Islander American, 0.1% Native Hawaiian or Pacific Islander and 4.1% Two or more races. 5.9% were Hispanic or Latino of any race.

=== 2000 census ===
As of the census of 2000, there were 20,534 people, 7,594 households, and 5,551 families residing in the CDP. The population density was 1,653.3 inhabitants per square mile (638.3/km^{2}). There were 7,900 housing units at an average density of 636.1 per square mile (245.6/km^{2}). The racial makeup of the CDP was 80.15% White, 12.76% African American, 0.37% Native American, 3.06% Asian, 0.08% Pacific Islander, 0.98% from other races, and 2.61% from two or more races. Hispanic or Latino of any race were 2.77% of the population.

There were 7,594 households, out of which 37.7% had children under the age of 18 living with them, 58.8% were married couples living together, 10.5% had a female householder with no husband present, and 26.9% were non-families. 19.7% of all households were made up of individuals, and 4.2% had someone living alone who was 65 years of age or older. The average household size was 2.70 and the average family size was 3.13.

In the CDP, the population was spread out, with 26.9% under the age of 18, 7.0% from 18 to 24, 38.7% from 25 to 44, 20.5% from 45 to 64, and 6.8% who were 65 years of age or older. The median age was 33 years. For every 100 females, there were 94.9 males. For every 100 females age 18 and over, there were 91.7 males.

The median income for a household in the CDP was $65,563, and the median income for a family was $69,098 (these figures had risen to $85,137 and $96,641 respectively as of a 2007 estimate). Males had a median income of $45,965 versus $32,659 for females. The per capita income for the CDP was $26,124. About 1.6% of families and 2.5% of the population were below the poverty line, including 1.8% of those under age 18 and 5.2% of those age 65 or over.

== Education ==
=== Public schools ===
Children in Odenton are served by the following public schools in the Anne Arundel County Public Schools district:

=== Elementary schools ===
- Crofton Woods Elementary School (Crofton)
- Four Seasons Elementary School (Gambrills)
- Odenton Elementary School
- Piney Orchard Elementary School
- Seven Oaks Elementary School
- Two Rivers Elementary School
- Waugh Chapel Elementary School

=== Middle schools ===
- Arundel Middle School
- Crofton Middle School (Gambrills)
- MacArthur Middle School (Ft. Meade)

=== High schools ===
- Arundel High School (Gambrills)
- Crofton High School (Gambrills)
- Meade High School (Fort Meade)

=== Private schools ===
- Odenton Christian School
- Annapolis Area Christian School near Severn, off of Burns Crossing Rd.
- School of the Incarnation (SOTI)

== Politics ==
Odenton is represented in the Maryland General Assembly by legislators in Districts 21, 32 and 33. District 21 is primarily in Prince George's County. District 32 also includes Severn, Linthicum, Heights, and Glen Burnie. District 33 also includes Severna Park, Crownsville and Crofton. Odenton is represented in District 4 of the Anne Arundel County Council.

== Notable natives ==
- Jackson Dean, country music singer
- Cam Whitmore, basketball player
- Trenton Foster, Chef and TFT personality

== Neighborhoods of Odenton ==
- Academy Yard
- Breezewood
- Chapelgate
- Chapel Grove
- Colony Ridge
- Crawfords Ridge
- Four Seasons
- Kings Ransom
- Kings Heights
- Lions Gate
- Maple Ridge
- Odenton Gardens
- Peach Tree
- Piney Orchard
- The Groves
- Harvest Run
- Seven Oaks
- Shelter Cove
- Two Rivers
