= Aisquith Farm E Archeological Site =

- U.S. National Register of Historic Places
- Nearest city: Riva, Maryland
- MPS: Prehistoric Human Adaptation to the Coastal Plain Environment of Anne Arundel County MPS
- NRHP reference No.: 91001601
- Added to NRHP: November 08, 1991

Aisquith Farm E Archeological Site is an archaeological site near Riva in Anne Arundel County, Maryland. It is one of several small sites located within the confines of Aisquith farm. It is associated with the Early and Middle Woodland periods of cultural development in Anne Arundel County. The site is significant as a base camp property type.

It was listed on the National Register of Historic Places in 1991.
