= Wiley H. Bates High School =

Historic school in Maryland, USA

- U.S. National Register of Historic Places
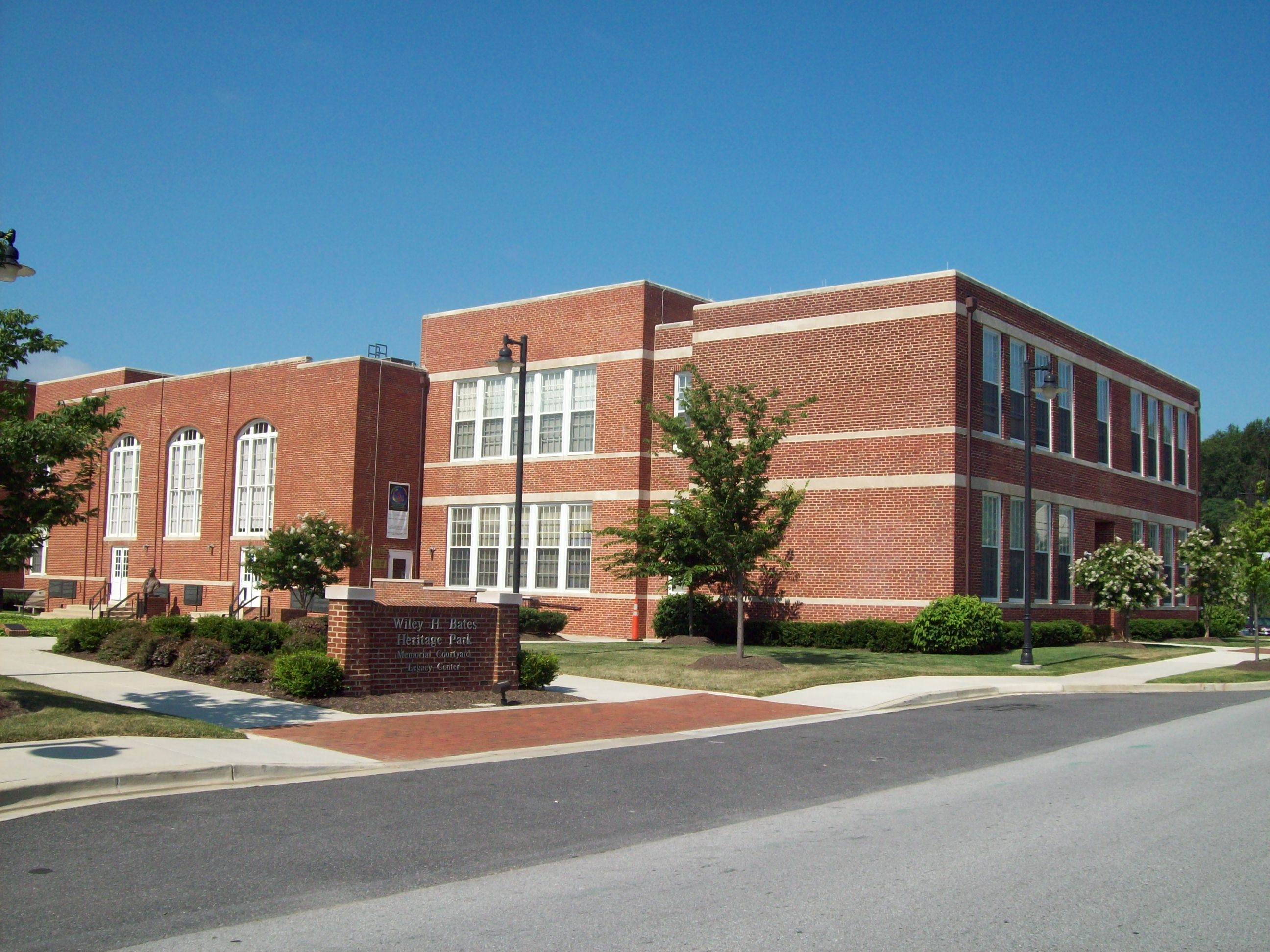
- Wiley H. Bates High School, July 2009

- Location within Maryland Location within the United States
- Location: 1029 Smithville Street, Annapolis, Maryland
- Coordinates: 38°58′28″N 76°30′44″W
- Area: 1.6 acres (0.65 ha)
- Built: 1932
- Architect: Buckler & Fenhagen; Et al.
- Architectural style: Colonial Revival
- NRHP reference No.: 92001267
- Added to NRHP: July 26, 1994

Wiley H. Bates High School was a historic black school building in Annapolis, Anne Arundel County, Maryland. It was completed in 1932, and replaced the original Annapolis Colored High School. The school building was named after Wiley H. Bates, a prominent African-American businessman and community leader whose financial donations enabled the school to be built. The name of the school lives on in Wiley H. Bates Middle School, while the original building has been turned into a retirement home combined community center.

== Architecture ==
The original portion of the building is a flat-roofed, two-story building of brick and masonry bearing walls and wood frame floor and roof structure in Colonial Revival style. First-floor classrooms were added to both the north and south sections in 1937, and second-floor classrooms were added in 1945. Additional teaching facilities were added in 1950, in a simplified International or Modern style.

The site is now known as Wiley H. Bates Heritage Park. The building has been repurposed into 71 senior housing units, a senior center, a boys and girls club, and a museum dedicated to Annapolis merchant and civic leader Wiley H. Bates.

Wiley H. Bates High School was listed on the National Register of Historic Places in 1994.

== School ==
Wiley H. Bates High School

Information
- Other name: Bates Junior High School (until 1981)
- Type: Public, segregated
- Opened: 1932
- Closed: 1981
- Last updated: 30 December 2017 or December 30, 2017 -->

Prior to desegregation, Bates was the only public school in the county that African-American students could attend for a secondary level education. In 1966, Annapolis schools were integrated by court order, the upper grades moved to Annapolis High School, and Bates continued as one of the city's two integrated junior high schools. In 1981, a new high school was constructed and Bates left its original building and moved into part of the old high school campus. Since 1990, it has been called Bates Middle School.
