= Childs Residence =

Historic house in Maryland, United States

- U.S. National Register of Historic Places
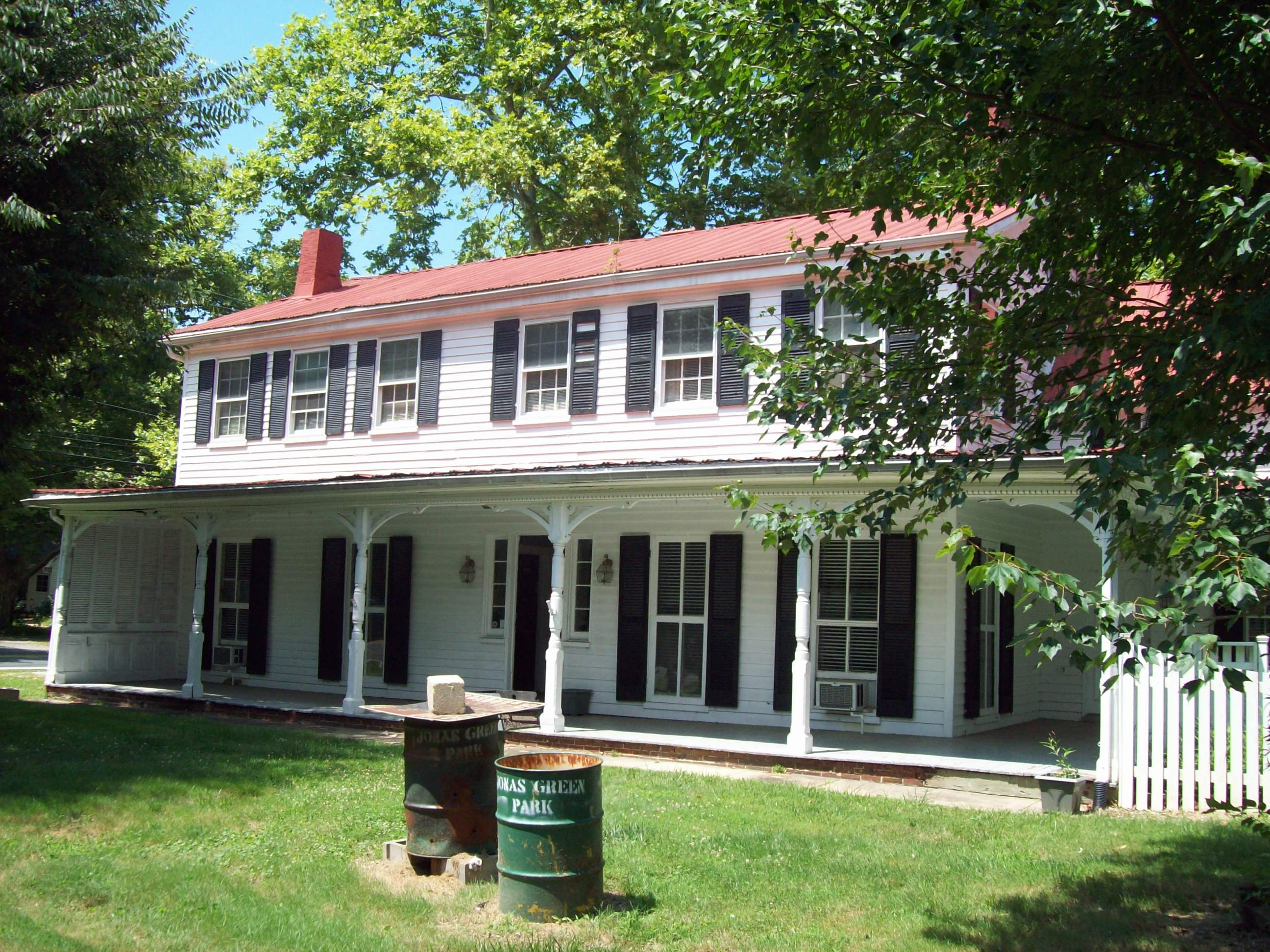
- Childs Residence, July 2009

- Location within Maryland Location within the United States
- Location: 1003 Cecil Ave., Millersville, Maryland
- Coordinates: 39°3′23″N 76°38′56″W
- Built: 1840
- NRHP reference No.: 86000416
- Added to NRHP: March 6, 1986

Childs Residence, also known as the George Miller Residence and Millersville Store and Post Office, is a historic home and associated buildings at Millersville, Anne Arundel County, Maryland. The home is a c. 1840 1 1/2-story frame dwelling with a large 2-story frame addition built about 1852. Also on the property are a frame smokehouse/dairy built about 1840, and a c. 1920 frame store. It served as the dwelling of the first Postmaster in Millersville, and is noteworthy for having continuously served as the Post Office and community store for 130 years. It is now home to the Anne Arundel County Trails program.

It was listed on the National Register of Historic Places in 1986.
