= WYZT-LP =

- Annapolis, Maryland; United States
- Frequency: 104.7 MHz
- Branding: Crab Radio

Programming
- Format: High school radio

Ownership
- Owner: Maryland Hall for the Creative Arts, Inc

Technical information
- Licensing authority: FCC
- Facility ID: 192596
- Class: LP1
- ERP: 57 watts
- HAAT: 33 metres (108 ft)
- Transmitter coordinates: 38°58′44.5″N 76°27′15.2″W

Links
- Public license information: LMS
- Website: crabradio.airtime.pro

WYZT-LP (104.7 FM, "Crab Radio") is a radio station licensed to serve the community of Annapolis, Maryland. The station is owned by Maryland Hall for the Creative Arts, Inc and is jointly produced with the Anne Arundel County Public Schools. It airs a high school radio format.

The station was assigned the WYZT-LP call letters by the Federal Communications Commission on March 9, 2015.
