= Epiphany Chapel and Church House =

Historic church in Maryland, United States

- U.S. National Register of Historic Places
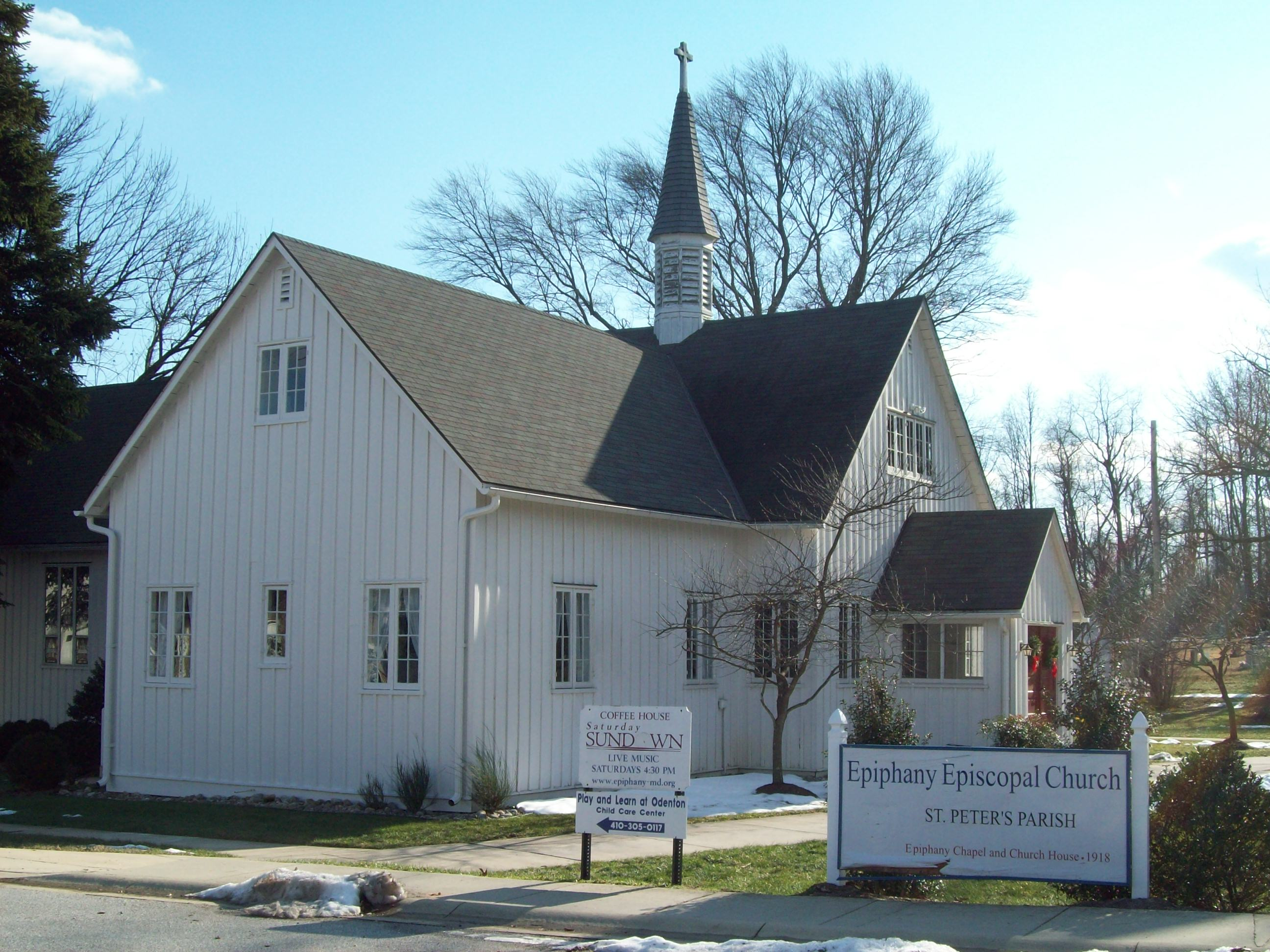
- Epiphany Chapel and Church House, December 2009

- Location within Maryland Location within the United States
- Location: 1419 Odenton Rd., Odenton, Maryland
- Coordinates: 39°5′13.6″N 76°42′31.3″W
- Area: less than one acre
- Built: 1918
- Architects: Buckler, Riggin (1882-1955)
- Architectural style: Bungalow/Craftsman
- NRHP reference No.: 01001336
- Added to NRHP: December 7, 2001

The Epiphany Chapel and Church House is a historic church at Odenton, Anne Arundel County, Maryland, United States. It is a two-story gable-roofed frame building constructed in 1918 and laid out in cruciform plan in the Arts and Crafts style. It is significant for its association with the mobilization of the United States military for World War I, since it was constructed adjacent to Camp Meade (now known as Fort George G. Meade), a major training camp for troops bound for the Western Front in Europe. Its design was an early work of the prominent Baltimore architect Riggin T. Buckler (1882-1955) of the partnership/firm of Sill, Buckler & Fenhagen.

The Epiphany Chapel and Church House was listed on the National Register of Historic Places in 2001.

== Gallery ==
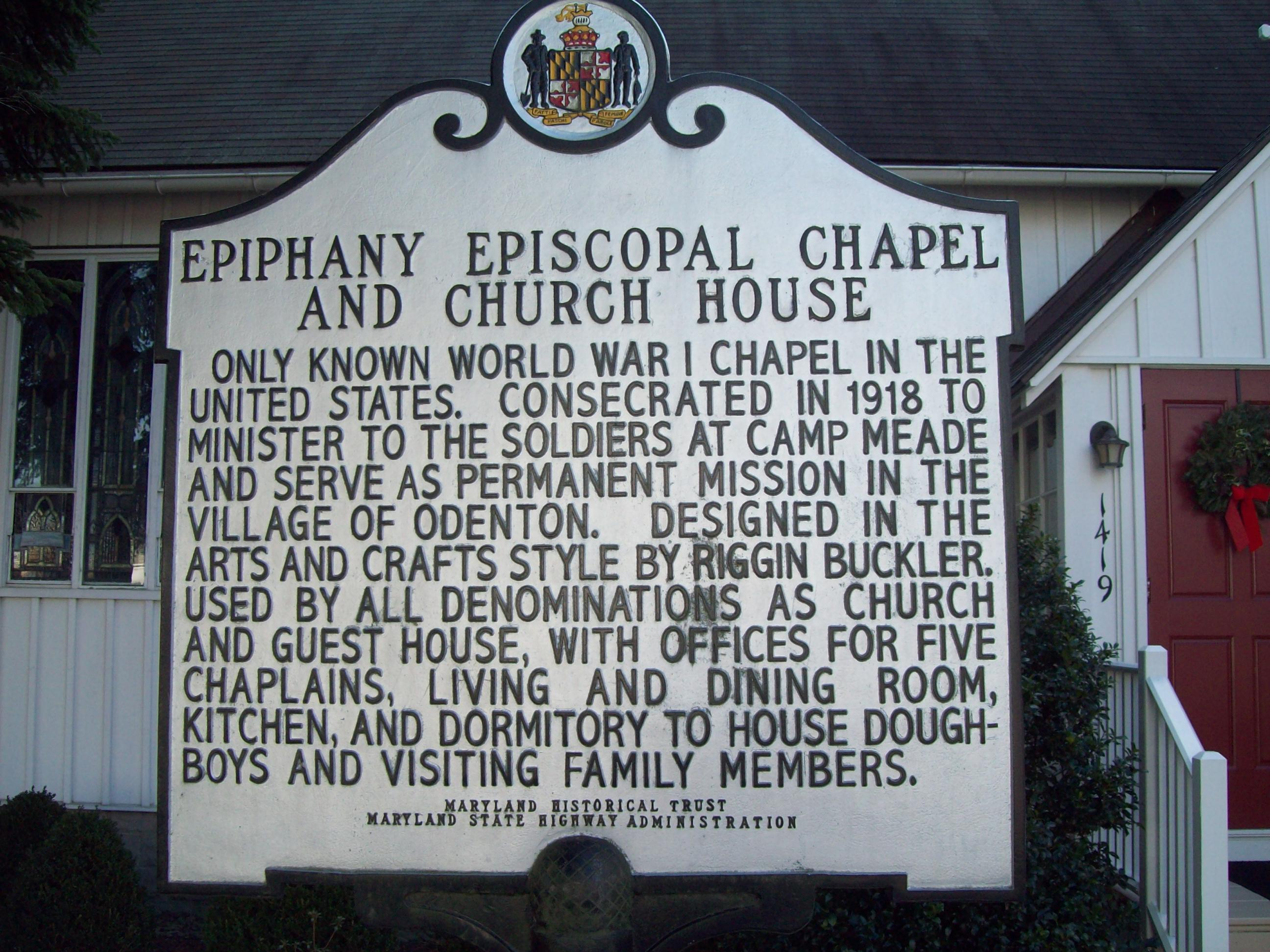
Epiphany Chapel and Church House, Historic Marker, December 2009
