= Odenton Masonic Lodge No. 209 =

Historic house in Maryland, United States

- U.S. National Register of Historic Places
- Location within Maryland Location within the United States
- Location: 1367 Odenton Rd., Odenton, Maryland
- Coordinates: 39°05′6.1″N 76°42′5.6″W
- Built: 1909-1912
- Built by: Asa J. Warfield
- Architectural style: Colonial Revival
- NRHP reference No.: 100007940
- Added to NRHP: July 25, 2022

Odenton Masonic Lodge No. 209, also known as Old Masonic Hall and Odenton Historical Center, is a historic Masonic lodge located at Odenton, Anne Arundel County, Maryland. It was built between 1909 and 1912, and is a two-story, frame meeting hall. It measures 5 bays by 3 bays, with a gable roof, and deep overhanging eaves. It features Colonial Revival-style detailing. The building remained in continuous use by the Masons until 2001 when they built a new lodge in a different Odenton location.

It was listed on the National Register of Historic Places in 2022.
