= Lula G. Scott Community Center =

- U.S. National Register of Historic Places
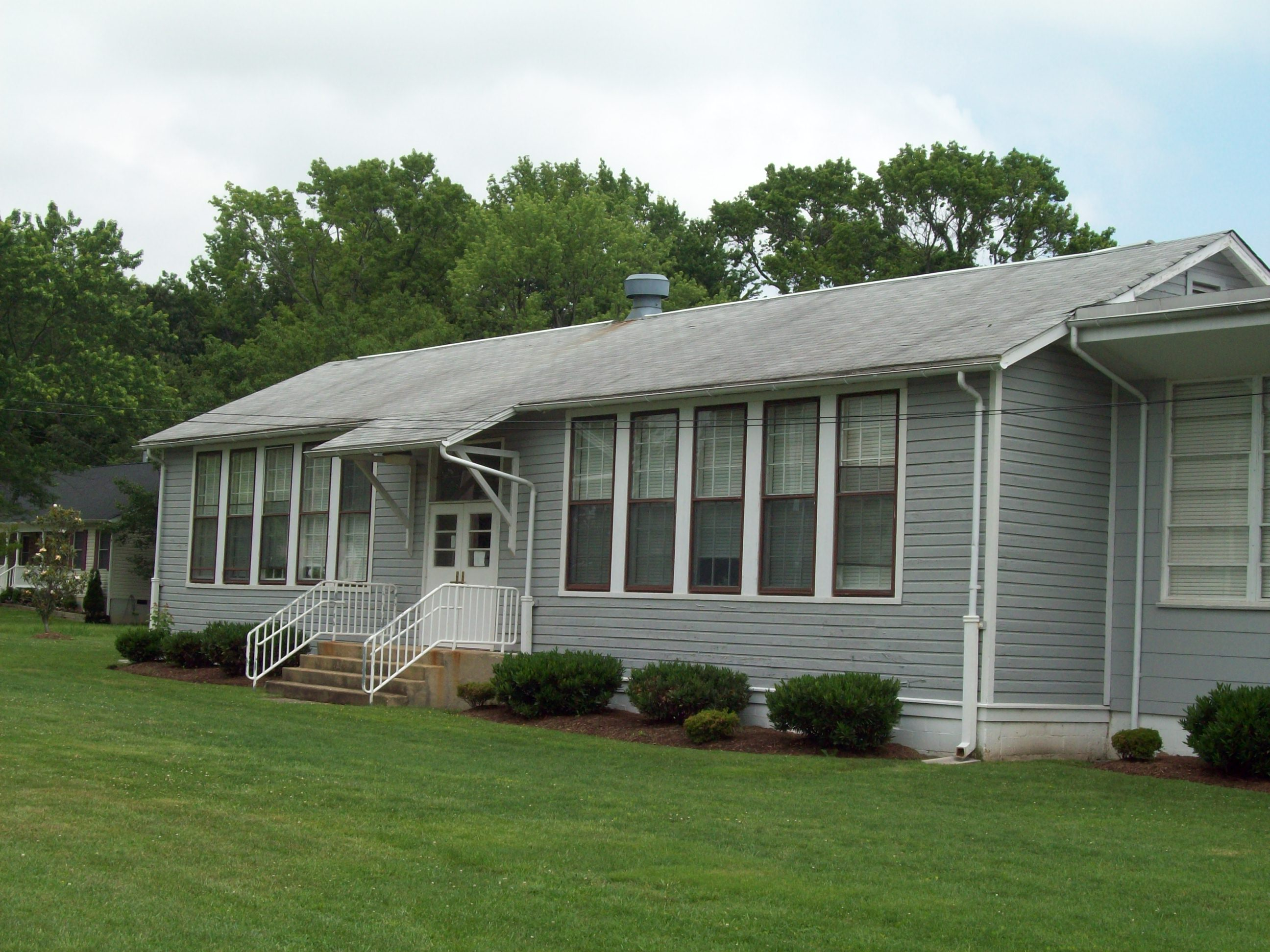
- Lula G. Scott Community Center; December 2009

- Location within Maryland Location within the United States
- Nearest city: 6243 Shady Side Rd., Shady Side, Maryland
- Coordinates: 38.83586°N 76.51412°W
- Area: 5.2 acres (2.1 ha)
- Built: 1921
- Architectural style: Rosenwald School
- MPS: Rosenwald Schools of Anne Arundel County, Maryland MPS
- NRHP reference No.: 09001093
- Added to NRHP: December 18, 2009

The Lula G. Scott Community Center is a historic site located at Shady Side, Maryland in Anne Arundel County, Maryland, United States. It now consists of two frame buildings that were built as Rosenwald Schools.

The buildings originally were built on separate sites. The Churchton School was constructed in 1921 and the Shady Side School was constructed in 1926. Both were built as single-story schools with two-room-plans. Decades later, one of the school buildings was moved to the site of the other, and expansion followed.

The Churchton school was moved to the Shady Side School site in 1953. A wing was added in 1958.

The site was listed on the National Register of Historic Places in 2009.

== See also ==
- Queenstown Rosenwald School
