= Old Mill High School =

Location
- 600 Patriot Lane; Millersville, Maryland; United States; 39°7′22″N 76°37′42″W

Information
- Type: Public, secondary
- Established: 1975
- School district: Anne Arundel County Public Schools
- Principal: Christian Thomas
- Grades: 9-12
- Enrollment: 2,445 (2023-2024 school year)
- Campus type: Large suburb
- Colors: Red, white, and blue
- Mascot: Patriot
- Rival: Severn Run High School
- Website: www.oldmillhs.org/m/

Old Mill High School is a public high school in Millersville, Maryland, United States, serving students in grades 9 through 12. It was occupied in 1975 and is administered by Anne Arundel County Public Schools (AACPS). The school was built to alleviate overcrowding at Arundel and Severna Park High Schools. It was built with no walls or ceilings in some classrooms, but later had walls installed. Old Mill High School is located in a suburb of Baltimore.

Along with Annapolis High School and Meade Senior High School, Old Mill Senior High is one of the three IB World Schools in AACPS.

The school mascot is the Patriot.

In 2024, the school split, with half of its population going to Severn Run High School.

The school building also houses Old Mill Middle School North, which is part of the Severn Run Cluster.

== Students ==
The Old Mill feeder area includes the southern half of Glen Burnie, and its cluster school is Old Mill Middle South. Old Mill Middle North is now zoned to Severn Run High School due to overpopulation

Old Mill High School is one of the most racially and socio-economically diverse high schools in Anne Arundel County, and the third most diverse public high school in Anne Arundel County. As of the 2023–2024 school year, the racial composition of the 2,445 Old Mill High School students was 33.62% White, 35.58% African American, 18.81% Hispanic, 4.74% Asian, and 6.34% two or more races. Further, 48.1% of students qualified for free and reduced price meals. The Old Mill cluster is bordered by the Severn cluster to the West, the Severna Park cluster to the south, Chesapeake to the east, and Glen Burnie to the north and east.

== Academics ==
Old Mill High School is a public magnet school. It has 2,445 students in grades 9–12, with a student-teacher ratio of 17 to 1. According to state test scores, 54% of students are at least proficient in math and 23% in reading.

After 2014, Old Mill High test scores dropped from an average 70.1% to 48.6%. As of 2024, the test score average wassits at 39.7%.

Old Mill ranks 90th out of 146 schools in Maryland on School Digger.

Old Mill High School has been an IB World School since April 2005. It offers the IB Diploma Programme, preceded by the Extended Learning Program (ELP), more commonly known as Pre-IB. The school offers a variety of standard level (SL) and higher level (HL) courses.

=== Other programs ===
- AVID
- ESOL
- AP

== Extracurricular activities ==
Students at Old Mill Senior High School are encouraged to participate in extracurricular, community, social and professional development organizations including:

- Asian American Heritage Club
- ASL Club
- Athletic Leadership Council
- Best Buddies
- Black Student Association
- Caribbean & African Unity Club
- Chemistry Club
- Chess Club
- Chinese Club
- Code Club
- Crochet Club
- D & D Club
- Dance Company
- Environmental Club
- Fellowship of Christian Athletes (FCA)
- Filipino American Students of Old Mill
- Film Club
- Future Business Leaders of America (FBLA)
- Games Club: Card/Board Games
- Games Club: Video Gaming
- Gender and Sexuality Alliance (GSA)
- IB Language Lab
- International Thespian Society (ITS)
- Jam Band
- Jazz Band
- Key Club
- Knitting Club
- Linguistics Analysis Club
- Literary Magazine
- Literature Club
- Marching Band
- Math Club
- Millionaire's Club
- Mixed Chorus/Vocal Ensemble
- Mock Trial
- Model United Nations
- Morgan's Message
- National Art Honor Society
- National Business Honor Society
- National English Honor Society
- National French Honor Society
- National Honor Society
- National Honor Society for Dance Arts
- National Honor Society Social Studies Rho Kappa
- National Math Honor Society
- National Spanish Honor Society
- National Technical Honor Society
- National Tri-M Music Honor Society
- Old Mill Stage Crew
- Old Mill Young Composers Club
- Orchestra
- Patriot Players Theatre Company
- Personal Project Support
- School Climate Committee
- SkillsUSA
- State of the Mill
- Steel Drum Band
- Step Team
- Stock Market Game
- Student Ambassadors (11th & 12th grade)
- Student Government Association (SGA)
- Technology Student Association/Robotics Club
- UNO Hour
- Visual Journaling for Advanced Levels
- Wealth of Knowledge Club
- Yearbook Club
- Yoga Club

== Notable alumni ==
- Kevin Barnes (2004), American football player
- Josh Hader (2012), baseball
- Jeong H. Kim (1979), founded Yurie Systems, president of Bell Labs
- Nick Kisner (2009), professional boxer
- Tim Newby (1992), writer and author
- Neil Parrott (1988), politician
- James E. Rzepkowski (1989), former member of Maryland House of Delegates
- Lester Speight (1981), American football player, professional wrestler and actor
