= Branden Albert =

American football player (born 1984)

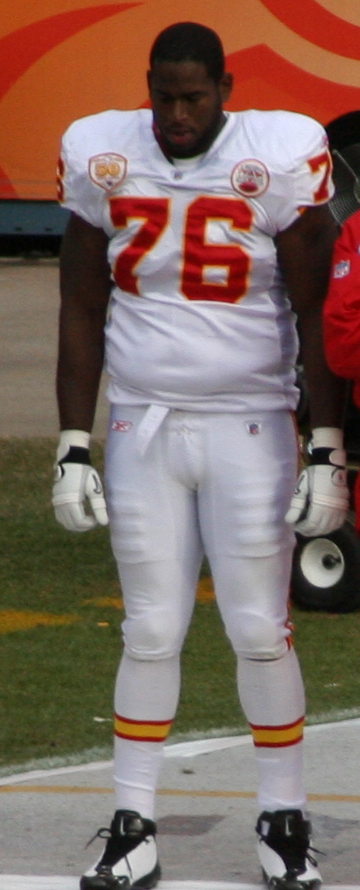
- Albert with the Kansas City Chiefs in 2010

No. 76, 71
- Position: Offensive tackle

Personal information
- Born: November 4, 1984 (age 42); Rochester, New York, U.S.
- Listed height: 6 ft 5 in (1.96 m)
- Listed weight: 314 lb (142 kg)

Career information
- High school: Glen Burnie (Glen Burnie, Maryland)
- College: Virginia (2005–2007)
- NFL draft: 2008: 1st round, 15th overall pick

Career history
- Kansas City Chiefs (2008–2013); Miami Dolphins (2014–2016); Jacksonville Jaguars (2017)*
- * Offseason or practice squad member only

Awards and highlights
- 2× Pro Bowl (2013, 2015); Third-team All-American (2007); First-team All-ACC (2007)

Career NFL statistics
- Games played: 120
- Games started: 118
- Stats at Pro Football Reference

Branden B. Albert (born November 4, 1984) is an American former professional football player who was an offensive tackle for nine seasons in the National Football League (NFL). He played college football for the Virginia Cavaliers and was selected by the Kansas City Chiefs 15th overall in the 2008 NFL draft. He also played for the Miami Dolphins and was a member of Jacksonville Jaguars before announcing his retirement in 2017.

== Early life ==
Albert grew up in a single-parent home in Rochester, New York. His mother, Susan Albert, decided to send him to Washington, D.C., where his older brother Ashley Sims, a defensive lineman for the Maryland Terrapins from 1994 to 1997, worked as a probation officer. As a junior at Glen Burnie High School, he started playing football. He was also a part of the basketball team, which made it to the state finals the final two years of Albert's career.

Considered only a two-star recruit by Rivals.com, Albert was not ranked among the nation's top recruits. Because he had played football for only one season, but also because of Albert's poor grades, the University of Virginia was the only school to recruit Albert, first helping him enroll at Hargrave Military Academy in Chatham, Va to improve his grades, and subsequently offering him a scholarship.

== College career ==
Still struggling academically, Albert spent the 2004 season at Hargrave Military Academy. He played football and was able to obtain a qualifying grade-point average and standardized test score. Albert would later credit Hargrave and coach Robert Prunty for his later success.

Albert started all 37 games during his three-year career at Virginia, mostly at the offensive guard position as D'Brickashaw Ferguson and later five-star recruit Eugene Monroe occupied the left tackle spot. He was only the second Virginia freshman since 1972 to start on the offensive line. Albert earned first-team All-Atlantic Coast Conference honors as a junior.

== Professional career ==
Pre-draft measurables
Height	Weight	Arm length	Hand span	40-yard dash	10-yard split	20-yard split	20-yard shuttle	Three-cone drill	Vertical jump	Broad jump	Bench press
6 ft 5 5/8 in (1.97 m)	309 lb (140 kg)	35 1/2 in (0.90 m)	10 1/2 in (0.27 m)	5.17 s	1.77 s	2.97 s	4.78 s	7.97 s	26 in (0.66 m)	9 ft 3 in (2.82 m)	23 reps
All values from NFL Combine

=== Kansas City Chiefs ===
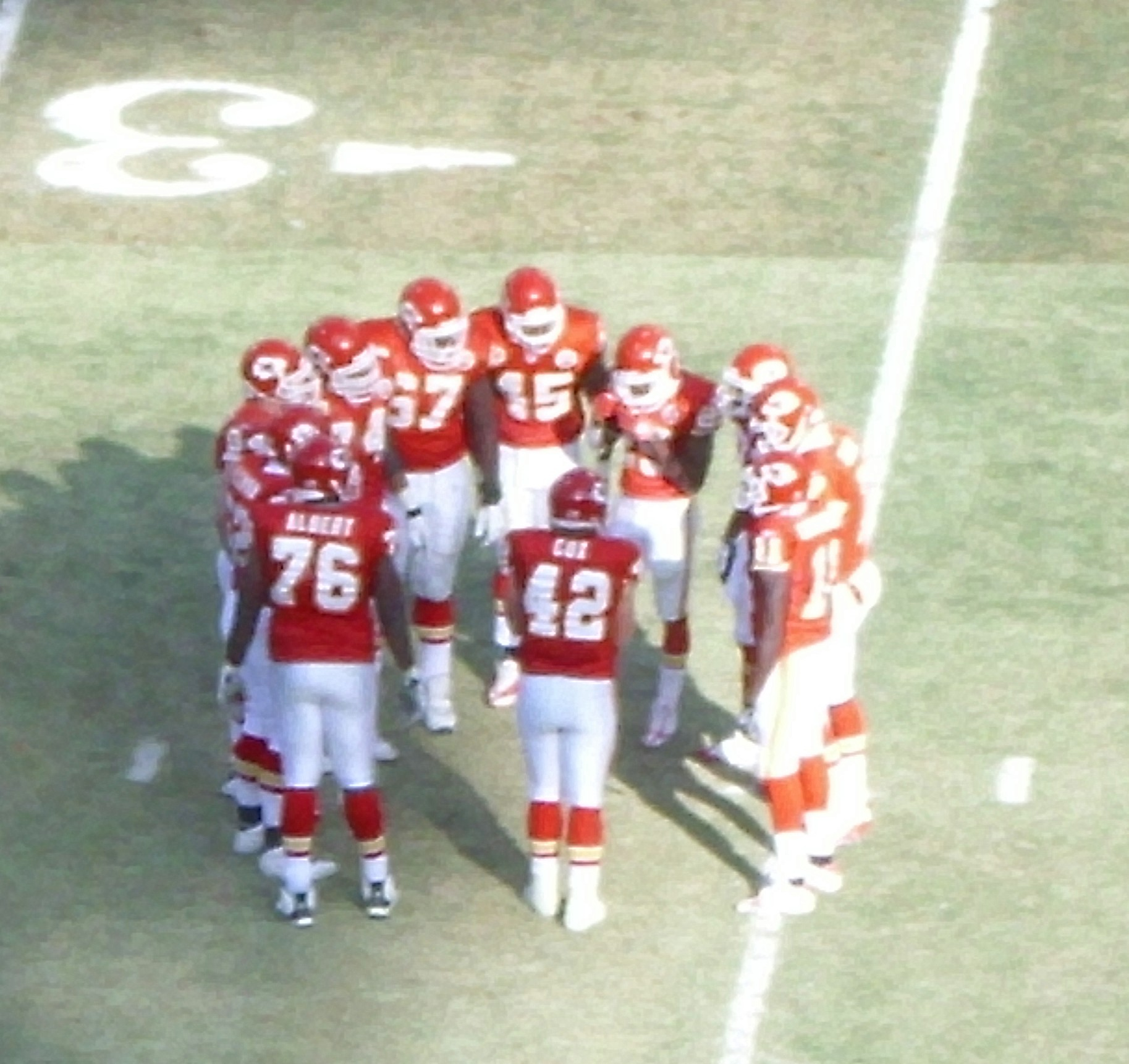
Albert (#76) in the huddle

Albert was selected with the 15th pick in the first round of the 2008 NFL Draft. Albert was the first guard taken in the draft, as well as the second Virginia Cavalier (behind No. 2 pick Chris Long). He was the highest selected guard since Chris Naeole went 10th overall to the New Orleans Saints in the 1997 NFL draft.

On July 24, 2008, Albert signed a five-year contract with the Chiefs. It was announced by the Chiefs that he would be moved to the tackle position, though he played guard at Virginia. Despite missing all four preseason games with a foot injury suffered at training camp, Albert still managed to start 15 games at left tackle (only missing Week 5 at Carolina due to an elbow injury). He allowed just 4.5 sacks in 2008, and the only penalty called against him all season was a false start.

With high expectations, 2009 was a disappointing struggle for Albert. He committed 10 penalties and his 9 sacks allowed were the fifth most in the league. He missed Week 6 and 7 with an ankle injury but started the other 14 games. Despite his struggles, Albert finished the season a little stronger allowing no sacks in the final three games. Head coach Todd Haley later called his 2009 performance an "adjustment period" after losing nearly 40 pounds the last offseason at his request.

Albert started 15 games in 2010 and had established himself as the Chiefs left tackle. He started 16 games in the 2011 season at left tackle, occasionally covering left guard due to the acquisition of Jared Gaither from the Baltimore Ravens.

Albert received the Chiefs franchise tag March 5, 2013.

Albert would have his best season in 2013 albeit playing in only 12 games. He was a key component in Kansas City's run scheme led by Jamaal Charles who totaled 1980 all purpose yards. Albert made it to the 2013 Pro Bowl.

=== Miami Dolphins ===
On March 11, 2014, Albert signed a five-year, $47 million contract with the Miami Dolphins. At the conclusion of the 2015 NFL season, Albert was selected to play in his second Pro Bowl.

=== Jacksonville Jaguars ===
On March 9, 2017, Albert was traded to the Jacksonville Jaguars for tight end Julius Thomas after he became expendable following the Miami Dolphins 2016 season. However, on July 31, 2017, Albert announced his retirement after nine seasons in the league, saying: "GOD has blessed me with so much through football that I thought would never be attainable. It's been truly a blessing. I cherish all of the relationships and people I have encountered while playing in the NFL!" After spending just over a week retired, Albert expressed interest in returning to the NFL and the Jaguars. On August 8, 2017, the Jaguars moved Albert from the "left team" list to the reserve/retired list after expressing interest in returning. On August 11, 2017, Albert was officially released by the Jaguars.

== Personal ==
Albert was arrested after he punched a large hole in a display cabinet in a jewelry store in Georgia in February 2018. He had entered an area that was only for staff, then asked to leave, after which he punched the cabinet. The police were called and Albert was tased twice. After the arrest he reached a deal where he paid for the damages and pledged 40 hours of community service, while also having to undergo a mental health examination.
