= Wiley H. Bates =

American businessman (1859–1935)

Wiley H. Bates (August 1, 1859 – April 1, 1935) was an American businessman, civic leader, and philanthropist. Born into slavery in North Carolina, Bates himself did not receive formal education, yet he was a lifelong advocate and supporter of the education system in the city where he lived most of his adult life, Annapolis, Maryland. Bates served one term as an alderman on the Annapolis City Council starting in 1897. He was the third black man to be elected as an alderman. He was considered one of the wealthiest black residents of Annapolis at the time. Bates earned his money from the highly popular grocery store he owned off of Cathedral Street in Annapolis.

Bates donated money to a lot of causes throughout his life. Most notably, he donated $500 for the purchasing of land for a new all-black high school, the first for black children in Anne Arundel County. The high school opened in 1932 bearing his name, Wiley H. Bates High School. Once Maryland schools were integrated by court order, the school then became Wiley H. Bates Middle School, until the school finally closed in 1981. The building has now been repurposed into a senior living facility, as well as housing the Annapolis Senior Center, and other community groups.

== Personal life ==
Born into slavery, Wiley began working at a very young age. After the Civil War, he worked odd jobs on the Chesapeake and Ohio Railway and then the Chesapeake and Ohio Canal. Bates moved to Annapolis with his mother in the early 1870s after the death of his father. Prior to opening his own grocery store around 1883, Bates worked multiple different jobs in the oyster and crabbing industries in Annapolis.

Wiley H. Bates married his first wife, Maggie (maiden name unknown) in 1884. They lived in a townhome across the street from his grocery store. After the death of Maggie in 1892, Bates later married Annie or "Addie" E. King on an unknown date. Annie also predeceased Wiley in 1921.

Neither marriage produced children, though a younger woman named Mattie Holt lived with Bates later in his life, and was considered his adopted daughter.

Wiley H. Bates died April 1, 1935. He is buried at the Brewer Hill Cemetery in Annapolis.
