= Annapolis High School (Maryland) =

Location
- 2700 Riva Road; Annapolis, Maryland 21401; United States; 38°58′27″N 76°33′53″W

Information
- Type: Public high school secondary school
- Established: 1896
- School district: Anne Arundel County Public Schools
- Principal: Audra Whayland
- Staff: 150
- Grades: 9-12
- Gender: Co-educational
- Enrollment: 2,200 (September 2018)
- Campus: Large suburb
- Colors: Maroon & Royal Blue
- Nickname: The Fighting Panthers (football); The Running Panthers (basketball); The Whamming Panthers (lacrosse)
- Accreditation: Middle States Association of Colleges and Schools
- Publication: Perception (literary magazine)
- Newspaper: The Panther Spot
- Yearbook: The Wake
- Website: School website

Annapolis High School is a four-year public high school located in the Parole census-designated place in Anne Arundel County, Maryland, United States, outside Annapolis. It is part of the Anne Arundel County Public Schools system and is accredited by the Middle States Association of Colleges and Schools. In 2013, Newsweek ranked Annapolis as one of the top 2,000 high schools in the country.

== History ==
Founded in 1896, Annapolis High was the first public high school to open in Anne Arundel County and among the first in the state of Maryland. Though nearby Arundel High School was founded earlier in 1854, it was run as a private school until 1926. The school originally occupied a brick building in historic, downtown Annapolis, but the post-World War I population surge led to the construction of a new school that stood on the outskirts of downtown Annapolis within a short distance from Wiley H. Bates "Colored" High School. In 1966 — more than a decade after the Supreme Court's ruling in Brown v. Board of Education — Annapolis High and Bates High were desegregated. Soon thereafter, the Wiley H. Bates High School became Annapolis Middle School for grades 9 and 10 in 1966-67 and Bates Junior High School for grades 7 to 9 in 1968. In 1979, Annapolis High moved to its present location on Riva Road outside the city limits. Its former buildings now house Bates (which has been a grades 6 to 8 middle school since 1989) and the Maryland Hall for the Creative Arts.

== Academics ==
In 2010, Annapolis High was ranked as the 16th best high school in the state of Maryland (3rd in Anne Arundel County; 297th overall) in Newsweek's America's Best High Schools list. Annapolis is noted for its International Baccalaureate (I.B.) program — one of three county schools with the program (the other two being Meade and Old Mill). The I.B. program is a rigorous college-preparatory curriculum for grades 11 and 12 that emphasizes critical thinking and features a strong international focus. The school also offers nearly every Advanced Placement (A.P.) class approved by the College Board as well as an English for Speakers of Other Languages program.

The Annapolis High math team has won the Anne Arundel County High School Mathematics Competition four years straight (2007, 2008, 2009, and 2010).

Annapolis High publishes a school newspaper (The Anchor), a yearbook (The Wake), a literary & arts magazine (Perception), and produces a newscast (Pantherama/P:tv).

== APEX Arts Magnet Program School ==
Beginning the 2012–2013 school year, Annapolis High School, along with Broadneck High School became an APEX Arts Magnet Program School (formerly the Performing and Visual Arts (PVA) high schools) of Anne Arundel County. APEX Arts is the now newest option of Magnet programs Anne Arundel County has to offer. Magnet Programs of Choice are optional advanced programs of studies, each specializing and emphasizing instruction in their own areas of interest. APEX Art's focuses delve into honing and strengthening artistic craft and talent. Students residing in Anne Arundel County have the opportunity to try out for APEX Arts, and if they pass their audition, they attend either Annapolis or Broadneck High School, depending on which branch of APEX Arts they audition for. The branches of APEX Arts that Annapolis houses are Creative Writing, Fine/Digital Visual Art, Dance, Film, Technical Production/Arts Management and Theatre. All branches of Broadkneck APEX Arts are affiliated with a field of Music.

County APEX Arts program high school students from both Annapolis and Broadneck collaborate and continue their art studies at a separate building, Studio 39 in downtown Historic Annapolis. Here students are given instruction by professionals in the art world, in additional after school classes. Students also perform shows, create art installations, and put up art galleries that are viewable to the public.

== Athletics ==
Annapolis High has a football program dating back to 1896 that has won state titles; a boys' basketball program — that has won several state titles; and boys' and girls' lacrosse programs dating back to 1929 that have won numerous state championships. Annapolis has also won state championships in girls' gymnastics (1989).

== Zero-basing controversy & academic turnaround ==
Adequate Yearly Progress is no longer a current measuring tool for schools. After the school's standardized test scores failed to meet federal Adequate Yearly Progress (AYP) standards, Anne Arundel County Schools Superintendent Kevin M. Maxwell required the school's entire staff — including the principal, administrators, teachers, secretaries, and custodians — to reapply for their positions in the fall of 2007, a controversial move termed "zero-basing" that is one of several reform options authorized by the Maryland Department of Education and the federal No Child Left Behind law. As a result, around half of the teachers and staff did not return in 2008. The school also hired a group of "AYP Specialists" and other support staff to focus primarily on ensuring that the school's standardized test scores reached state and federal standards. Within 30 months of zero-basing, the school successfully made an academic turnaround and met AYP standards in two consecutive years and increased the number of students who passed the Maryland School Assessment 34 percentage points in English and 19 points in math. As a result of this turnaround, principal Don Lilley was named the state's best principal by the Maryland Association of Secondary School Principals in 2010. As of the 2011–12 school year, Annapolis High did not make AYP despite extensive efforts by teachers to do so. Adequate Yearly Progress was discontinued in 2015.

== Notable alumni ==
- Joseph W. Alton, sheriff and state senator
- Larry Beavers, former NFL pro football player for the New Orleans Saints and the Carolina Panthers.
- Bill Belichick, head football coach at the University of North Carolina, former head coach of the New England Patriots. Eight time Super Bowl champion.
- Sally Brice-O'Hara, 27th Vice-Commandant of the U.S. Coast Guard.
- Donald Brown former NFL pro football player
- Robert A. Costa, Maryland legislator, member of Maryland House of Delegates.
- Roger Moyer, politician, Mayor of Annapolis (1965–1973)
- Dan Ruland, former professional basketball player
- Andrea Seabrook, radio reporter for National Public Radio
