= Southern High School (Harwood, Maryland) =

Location
- 4400 Solomons Island Road; Harwood, Maryland; United States; 38°52′6″N 76°37′10″W

Information
- Type: Public secondary
- Established: 1968
- Principal: Angela Hopkins
- Grades: 9-12
- Enrollment: 1,063 (Fall 2016)
- Campus: Rural fringe
- Colors: Blue and gold
- Mascot: Bulldog
- Website: https://www.southernhigh.org/

Southern High School is a high school located in Harwood, Maryland, U.S., in Anne Arundel County. The school is operated by Anne Arundel County Public Schools. Southern was recognized as a Blue Ribbon School in 2009. They recently won the 2A State Lacrosse Championship 20–7, tying the record for most goals scored in a state championship game in Maryland state history. Also known as a great unified sports program that seeks participation and inclusion of every one.

== Academics and rankings ==
Southern High School is one of two public high schools in Anne Arundel County to earn both a National and Maryland Blue Ribbon Award, the other being Severna Park High School.

In 2019, U.S. News & World Report ranked Southern High School among the top 25 high schools in the Baltimore metro area, which included a ranking of public high schools in Anne Arundel County, Baltimore, Baltimore County, Carroll County, Howard County, Harford County, and Queen Anne's County.

Southern High School offers 26 AP courses, exceeding the state average of 18 and the county average of 25.

== History ==
In 1920, a grammar and secondary school was established in Tracys Landing, which would later be known as Southern High School. The school's first principal was Mr. Oscar Webster. In 1933, a new Southern High School was constructed in Lothian.

During the late 1940s, the school expanded with the addition of an agriculture shop, multiple classrooms, a cafeteria, and a gymnasium. By the early 1950s, it had evolved into Southern Junior-Senior High School, serving around 300 students. In 1952, Southern introduced its first-ever mascot. The Bulldog was selected for its representation of loyalty, determination, and the will to win. In 2008, the school received a Maryland Blue Ribbon award and in 2009 won a National Blue Ribbon School award.

== Notable alumni ==
- Dylan Behler, member of Maryland House of Delegates
- Phillip D. Bissett, former member of Maryland House of Delegates
- Dale Castro, former football player and coach
- Brothers Osborne, Country Music Award-winning duo. Brothers John and TJ graduated in 2000 and 2002 respectively.
