= Seven Oaks, Maryland =

Unincorporated community in Maryland, U.S.

Coordinates: 39°06′20″N 76°42′29″W

Seven Oaks is an unincorporated community in Anne Arundel County, Maryland, United States. It is included in the census-designated place of Odenton, and lies across from Fort Meade. Seven Oaks covers more than 725 acres (2.93 km^{2}) of land, and development began in 1987.

The neighborhood includes a nature reserve, elementary school, community center with outdoor pool, fitness center, tennis courts, basketball court, second smaller pool on the opposite side of the community, daycare center and small shopping center. Seven Oaks has approximately 4,000 residential units and 1,500,000 square feet (140,000 m^{2}) of retail, commercial and office space. Seven Oaks has single family homes, town homes, apartments, and duplex homes.

The Base Realignment and Closure, 2005 plan was expected to bring about 700 families to Seven Oaks.

== Education ==
The Seven Oaks area is served by the following schools:

- Seven Oaks Elementary School
- MacArthur Middle School (Fort Meade)
- Meade High School (Fort Meade)
