= Riva, Maryland =

- Census-designated place
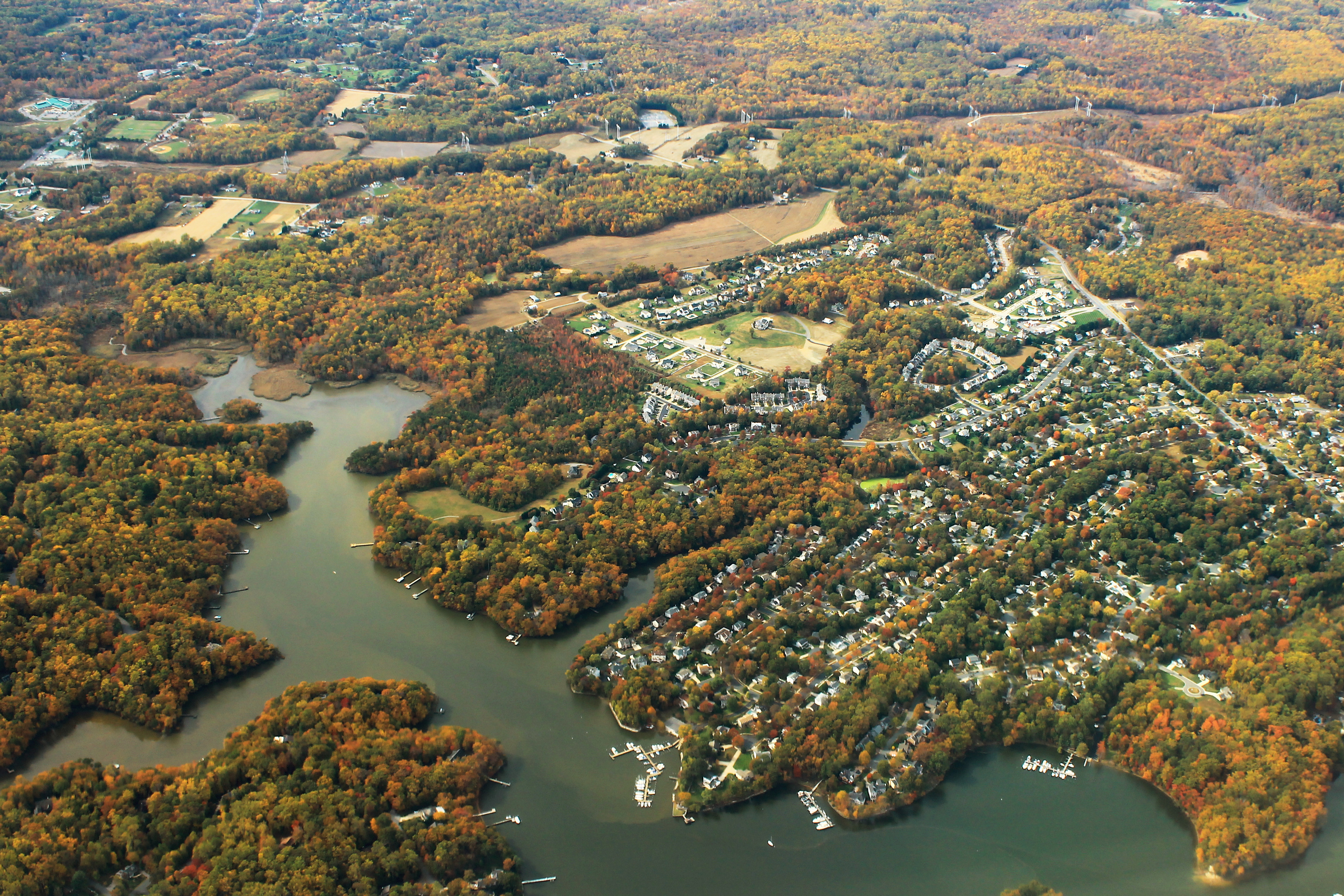
- Aerial view of Riva

- Location of Riva, Maryland
- Coordinates: 38°57′7″N 76°34′56″W
- Country: United States
- State: Maryland
- County: Anne Arundel

Area
  - Total: 2.90 sq mi (7.52 km^{2})
  - Land: 2.46 sq mi (6.36 km^{2})
  - Water: 0.45 sq mi (1.16 km^{2})
- Elevation: 43 ft (13 m)

Population (2020)
  - Total: 4,257
  - Density: 1,732.9/sq mi (669.08/km^{2})
- Time zone: UTC−5 (Eastern (EST))
  - Summer (DST): UTC−4 (EDT)
- ZIP code: 21140
- Area codes: 410, 443, and 667
- FIPS code: 24-66400
- GNIS feature ID: 0591136

Riva is a census-designated place (CDP) in Anne Arundel County, Maryland, United States. The population was 4,257 at the 2020 census. The area is scenic, especially where the two-lane Riva Road crosses the South River on a bridge. The area is growing with large new homes as the suburbs of Annapolis grow outward. Riva is bordered by Annapolis to the north, Edgewater to the east, and Davidsonville to the west.

Currently Riva is served by Central Elementary School, Davidsonville Elementary School, Central Middle School, and South River High School in Edgewater, Maryland. Notable private schools near Riva include Key School, Indian Creek School, Saint Andrew's Day School, and Arnold Christian Academy.

== History ==
Aisquith Farm E Archeological Site was listed on the National Register of Historic Places in 1991.

There have been several large developments made in Riva over the years.

Sylvan Shores

Riva Farms

Berkshire 1978 - 1981

Annapolis Landing 1979 -

== Geography ==
Riva is located at 38°57′7″N 76°34′56″W (38.952079, −76.582135).

According to the United States Census Bureau, Riva has a total area of 2.9 square miles (7.5 km^{2}), of which 2.5 square miles (6.4 km^{2}) is land and 0.46 square miles (1.2 km^{2}), or 15.37%, is water.

== Demographics ==
Historical population
Census	Pop.	Note	%±
2000	3,966		—
2010	4,076		2.8%
2020	4,257		4.4%
2022 (est.)	4,784	▲	12.4%
Sources: 2000-2020

=== 2020 census ===
As of the 2020 census, Riva had a population of 4,257. The median age was 44.3 years. 23.4% of residents were under the age of 18 and 19.6% of residents were 65 years of age or older. For every 100 females there were 98.7 males, and for every 100 females age 18 and over there were 97.9 males age 18 and over.

90.3% of residents lived in urban areas, while 9.7% lived in rural areas.

There were 1,529 households in Riva, of which 34.9% had children under the age of 18 living in them. Of all households, 66.3% were married-couple households, 11.9% were households with a male householder and no spouse or partner present, and 17.1% were households with a female householder and no spouse or partner present. About 16.0% of all households were made up of individuals and 8.5% had someone living alone who was 65 years of age or older.

There were 1,595 housing units, of which 4.1% were vacant. The homeowner vacancy rate was 0.9% and the rental vacancy rate was 4.9%.

Racial composition as of the 2020 census
Race	Number	Percent
White	3,641	85.5%
Black or African American	105	2.5%
American Indian and Alaska Native	6	0.1%
Asian	84	2.0%
Native Hawaiian and Other Pacific Islander	2	0.0%
Some other race	69	1.6%
Two or more races	350	8.2%
Hispanic or Latino (of any race)	212	5.0%

=== 2000 census ===
As of the 2000 census, there were 3,966 people, 1,423 households, and 1,169 families residing in the CDP. The population density was 1,589.0 inhabitants per square mile (613.5/km^{2}). There were 1,453 housing units at an average density of 582.2 per square mile (224.8/km^{2}). The racial makeup of the CDP was 94.23% White, 3.43% African American, 1.21% Asian, 0.15% from other races, and 0.98% from two or more races. Hispanic or Latino of any race were 2.12% of the population.

There were 1,423 households, out of which 37.6% had children under the age of 18 living with them, 72.1% were married couples living together, 6.3% had a female householder with no husband present, and 17.8% were non-families. 13.6% of all households were made up of individuals, and 4.1% had someone living alone who was 65 years of age or older. The average household size was 2.79 and the average family size was 3.07.

In the CDP, the population was spread out, with 26.1% under the age of 18, 5.1% from 18 to 24, 28.8% from 25 to 44, 32.0% from 45 to 64, and 7.9% who were 65 years of age or older. The median age was 39 years. For every 100 females, there were 102.1 males. For every 100 females age 18 and over, there were 98.3 males.

The median income for a household in the CDP was $88,287, and the median income for a family was $95,457. Males had a median income of $54,750 versus $36,122 for females. The per capita income for the CDP was $41,975. About 1.1% of families and 0.9% of the population were below the poverty line, including 1.2% of those under age 18 and 1.5% of those age 65 or over.

== Notable Person ==
- Peter Bondra, former NHL player, former general manager of the Slovakia men's national ice hockey team.
