= Glen Burnie High School =

Public secondary school in Baltimore, Maryland

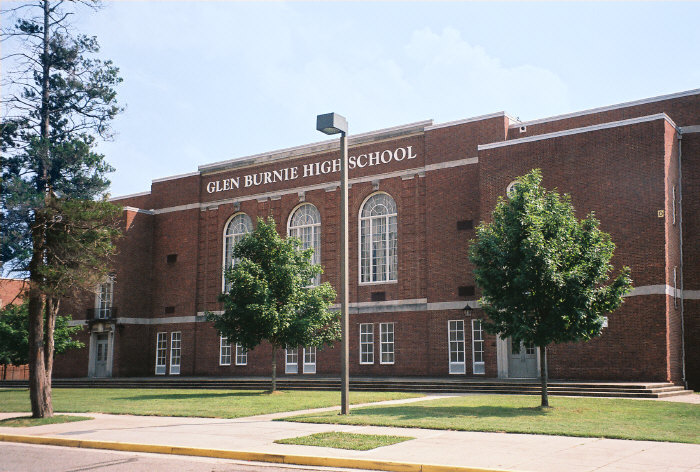
- The Old Main Building (1932)

Location
- 7550 Baltimore Annapolis Blvd; Glen Burnie, Maryland; United States; 39°9′37″N 76°37′0″W

Information
- Type: Public secondary
- Motto: Graduate, Believe, Hope, Succeed
- Established: 1923
- Principal: Kevin Carr
- Grades: 9-12
- Enrollment: 2,132
- Campus: Suburban
- Colors: Red and White
- Mascot: Gopher
- Newspaper: The Burrow
- Yearbook: Le Souvenir
- Website: https://glenburniehs.org/

Glen Burnie High School is a large public high school located in the Baltimore suburb of Glen Burnie, Maryland, United States. Founded in 1923, the school is part of the Anne Arundel County Public Schools system.

Today, Glen Burnie Senior High School is a bustling campus-style high school consisting of six buildings and athletic fields. In addition to serving as the educational institution for the area's school population, it is also the center for many community activities.

== History and campus ==
Glen Burnie High School opened in 1923 with a freshman and sophomore class using several rooms in Richard Henry Lee Elementary School. The school moved during the following year to an old elementary school building located on First Avenue SW. Glen Burnie High School was approved by the Maryland State Board of Education in 1924. Prior to this time, Anne Arundel County had only two high schools, which were located in Annapolis (Annapolis High School), and Millersville (Arundel High School, moved to Gambrills in 1949). For a number of years, Glen Burnie High School served the entire northern end of Anne Arundel County.

The first graduating class, in 1926, had only four members. However, population growth in the school area soon led to serious overcrowding at the First Avenue building. Additional classes were held in the Old Town Hall, a frame building adjacent to the school. Other classes were also held in a new community hall built by the Masonic Lodge. Land located on Baltimore and Annapolis Boulevard, on the outskirts of the town of Glen Burnie, was purchased by the Anne Arundel County Board of Education from Curtis Creek Mining and Manufacturing Company. Subsequent purchases of smaller parcels of land brought the total area to 34 acres (140,000 m^{2}). School construction began in 1931, and the present Old Main Building was ready for occupancy in October 1932. Total construction cost was $164,200.

The Annex was added at a cost of $27,000 and it housed the industrial arts classes. In 1937, wings were added to the Old Main building to accommodate a growing population. The Vocational Education building was completed in 1948 at a cost of $987,000 and provided classroom space and instruction areas for the Trades. It served for many years as the Vocational Technical Center for all schools in the North County until a new Vocational Technical Center —named the Center of Applied Technology North— was constructed in 1976. The present Business Education building was opened as Glen Burnie Junior High School in 1948. In 1955, the present gymnasium was constructed at a cost of $519,000 plus equipment. In 1958, further increases in the school area population led to the construction of a new junior high school in Marley. The former junior high school building was turned over to Glen Burnie High School and was equipped for instruction in Business Education. Once the old junior high building became part of the high school, its gymnasium gave the school two full gymnasiums for the physical education classes and sporting events.

The Administration building, constructed in 1964, added the long needed auditorium. Cost of the building and equipment was $1,036,667 and included administrative, guidance, and supervisory offices plus additional classrooms.

In 1976, the Media building was constructed as one part of the complete renovation of Glen Burnie Senior High School. The renovation included the removal of the Annex from Old Main, improvement to the athletic fields, updated office education equipment including mini and microcomputers, and air conditioning the entire school. The cost of this renovation was about $13 million.

In 2010, Glen Burnie High School became home to the STEM/BMAH Magnet Program, which according to the AACPS website, "invites students who are highly motivated and academically eligible to study and explore career opportunities across the spectrum of healthcare professions, engineering, and health information technology systems."

== Administration ==
Glen Burnie High School's first principal was Donald Powers, a teacher and principal, located at First Avenue, the school's first campus. Miss L. Todd Motley replaced Powers in 1925, serving as principal until her retirement in 1948. Charles W. "Pop" Whayland was then appointed principal and served in that capacity until his death in February 1969. Craig Lundberg succeeded Whayland as principal serving from February 1969 until 1973. Katherine Frantum served as principal from 1973 to her retirement in 1981. Later principals were: James McGowan (1981–1986), Midgie Sledge (1986–1994), Oliver Wittig (1994–1996), David Hill (1996–2003), and Sam Salamy (2003–2008). Vickie Plitt succeeded Salamy as principal in August 2008. At the start of the 2018-2019 school year, Scott McGuire began his tenure as principal of Glen Burnie High School. Kevin Carr took over as principal in October 2022 after Scott McGuire was promoted.

== Student life ==
Glen Burnie High School has enrolled 2345 students and employs 130 teachers, an approximate ratio of one teacher for every 18 students. The school's colors, red and white, are reflected in the mascot, the Gopher, and school motto, "Gopher it" or "Go Gopher." Le Souvenir, the yearbook, has appeared regularly each year since it was first published in 1929.

In 2007, the school and the Glen Burnie Business Advisory Board began the GBHS Alumni Wall of Honor to recognize distinguished alumni in mentoring students, with plaques awarded to honorees at ceremonies held before the homecoming football game.

The school also participates in the Fulbright Teacher Exchange Program, with a visiting teacher from Morocco conducting a language class in 2008.

== Notable alumni ==
- Branden Albert, NFL Player
- Toni Braxton, R&B singer-songwriter
- Mark S. Chang, politician
- Bill Currier, NFL player
- James E. DeGrange, Sr., politician
- Wayne Fowler, NFL player
- John G. Gary, politician
- Alessandra Marc, opera singer
- C. Edward Middlebrooks, politician
- Tony Saunders, MLB player
- Leonard T. Schroeder Jr., US Army Officer and first American to land on the beach on D-Day in WWII
- Ezekiel Turner, NFL Player
- Cynthia Voigt, author (former English teacher)
- William McFarland, House Sergeant at Arms
