= Millersville, Maryland =

Unincorporated community in Maryland, United States

- Unincorporated community
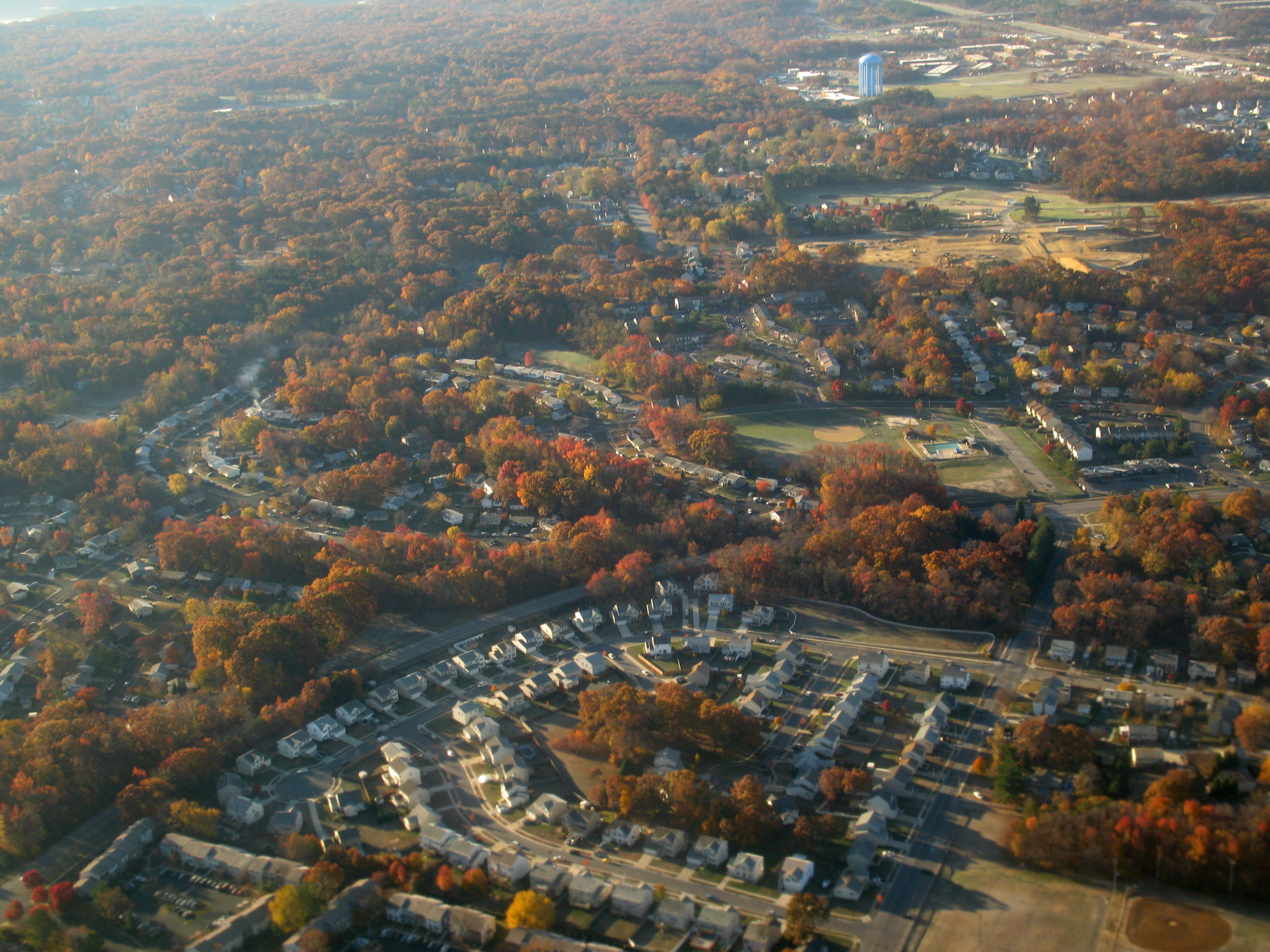
- Old Mill Blvd. and subdivisions seen from the air, 2007

- Location within the state of Maryland Millersville (the United States)
- Coordinates: 39°03′34″N 076°38′53″W
- Country: United States
- State: Maryland
- County: Anne Arundel
- Elevation: 100 ft (30 m)

Population (2015)
  - Total: 20,965
- Time zone: UTC-5 (Eastern (EST))
  - Summer (DST): UTC-4 (EDT)
- ZIP code: 21108
- Area codes: 410, 443 and 667
- GNIS feature ID: 590805

Millersville is an unincorporated community in Anne Arundel County, Maryland, United States. Population was 20,965 in 2015 based on American Community Survey (U.S. Census Bureau) data.

== Geography ==
Millersville is located at 39°03′34″N 076°38′53″W (39.0596, -76.6480).

== History ==
Millersville, named for the first Postmaster, George Miller, was the first Post Office to be established, on July 24, 1841, along the Annapolis & Elkridge Railroad (the A & E). Completed in 1840, the A & E was one of the earliest rail lines in the U.S., connecting Annapolis with the Washington Branch of the Baltimore and Ohio Railroad. Today, Millersville is largely suburban, but the core of the historic village remains. The Childs Residence, listed on the National Register of Historic Places in 1986, is a focal point of the new bike trail that passes through the historic core.

== Education ==
=== Secondary schools ===
- Elvaton Christian Academy
- Old Mill High School
- Olde Mill Christian Academy
- Old Mill Middle North
- Old Mill Middle South
- Rockbridge Academy
- Severna Park Middle School (serves Millersville students residing in Shipley’s Choice and Brittingham)
- Severna Park High School (serves Millersville students residing in Shipley’s Choice and Brittingham)

Severn Run High School

=== Colleges and universities ===
- Anne Arundel Community College

288-acre park

== Parks and recreation ==
- Baltimore & Annapolis Trail
- Kinder Farm Park
- Southgate/Old Mill Park
