= Meade Senior High School =

High school in Maryland

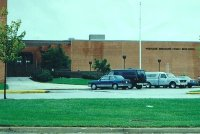

Location
- 1100 Clark Road; Fort Meade, MD 20755; United States; 39°7′21″N 76°44′17″W

Information
- Type: Public
- Motto: "Catch the Mustang Spirit"
- Established: 1977; 49 years ago
- School district: Anne Arundel County
- Principal: Ryan Durr
- Grades: 9th–12th
- Enrollment: 2,330 (2024)
- Hours in school day: 8:30am – 3:18pm
- Campus type: Large suburb
- Colors: Purple, gray, and black (yellow and brown in the past); Sports: Black, gray, and white
- Sports: Yes
- Mascot: "Maverick the Mustang"
- Rival: Old Mill High School Patriots
- Website: meadeseniorhigh.org

Meade Senior High School is a public high school for grades 9 through 12 located at Fort Meade, Maryland, United States and is administered by Anne Arundel County Public Schools. Since its opening in 1977, the school has been accredited by the Middle States Association of Colleges and Schools Commission on Secondary Schools. The building recently was rebuilt. The school is currently ranked 13th out of 18 high schools in the Anne Arundel County Public School System. (2024)

== Academics ==
Regular course curriculum departments include: Art, Army JROTC, Business Education, English, Family & Consumer Sciences, Foreign Language (Spanish, French, Chinese, American Sign Language), Mathematics, Music, Physical & Health Education, Science, Social Sciences, Special Education, and Technology Education.

=== International Baccalaureate ===
Meade High School is one of three International Baccalaureate (IB) schools in Anne Arundel County. IB courses, in both the Middle Years (MYP) and Diploma (DP) Programmes, prepare students aged 16–19 for success in higher education and society. Many of the offered DP courses are given at both a standard and higher level.

== Extracurricular activities ==
Meade's rival in extracurricular activities is Old Mill High School.

=== Athletics ===
The Meade Mustangs participate in a variety of sports, including:

==== Fall ====
- Cheerleading
- Cross country
- Field hockey (girls)
- Football (boys)
- Golf
- Soccer
- Tennis
- Volleyball (girls)

==== Winter ====
- Basketball
- Bowling
- Cheerleading
- Indoor track
- Swimming
- Wrestling

==== Spring ====
- Baseball (boys)
- Bocce
- Lacrosse
- Outdoor track
- Softball (girls)
- Tennis

== Demographics ==
Ethnic Breakdown (2023)
Ethnicity	# of students	% of students
African-American	1,122	48.2%
Asian	108	4.6%
HI/Pacific Islander	11	0.5%
Hispanic (of any race)	701	30.1%
White	235	10.1%
Two or more races	146	6.3%

== Awards and recognition ==
Most notably the girls' and boys' track teams have won county and region championships since 2006. The outdoor boys' track team won their first state championship in 2007. Meade High School made AYP four years in a row, a major accomplishment. The 2011–2012 Meade wrestling team also won their first ever county championship that year while holding the best record out of any Meade sports team that year at 19–3. The M4 (Mighty Meade Mustang Marching) Band also went to ACC's (Atlantic Coastal Championships) for the first time in the history of the school in 2005, and returned in the fall of 2009 and 2010. The basketball team won the state championship in March 2015.

== Notable alumni ==
- Haddaway, singer, hit song: "What Is Love"
- Marina Harrison, first woman to represent Maryland at both Miss USA and Miss America
- Connie Isler, youngest head coach at Division I level, women's golf at Georgetown University
- Elijah Thurmon, wide receiver with the NFL Philadelphia Eagles and Oakland Raiders, and three CFL teams

== Westboro Baptist Church protest ==
In April 2011, the Westboro Baptist Church of Topeka, Kansas, protested against Meade High School, claiming that the school had a high number of homosexual students. When the group revisited the county in March 2012, it was brought to the attention of many Anne Arundel County residents, and a crowd of about 500 people showed up and protested Westboro Baptist Church. Meade is one of three high schools in Maryland to be protested by the Westboro Baptist Church, the other two being Glen Burnie High School, also in Anne Arundel County, and Walt Whitman High School of Montgomery County.

== Past problems ==
Meade Senior High School's reputation among Anne Arundel County schools was poor as of 2007, with some parents and students in disagreement. This negative reputation stems from events in 2005, when former Principal Joan Valentine was accused of blocking efforts to investigate the beating of a single white student by ten to fifteen black students in January of that year.

Near the end of the 2006–2007 year, during the final day of exams, around twenty students became involved in a physical altercation which resulted in the involvement of police forces from multiple jurisdictions and minor injuries to policemen. A group of parents lodged complaints against the police for roughing up their children.

On September 30, 1994, a brawl started that injured three teachers and six students. Media specialist and Senior Class advisor, Don Gobbi, attempted to break up the fight and was punched and thrown to the floor. As he lay in the fetal position students began to kick him. Gobbi was flown by Maryland State Helicopter to Maryland Medical Center shock trauma. Teacher John O'Neill also attempted to break up the fight and was taken to North Arundel Hospital with minor injuries. The third teacher was not hospitalized. Gobbi was released from the hospital later that day and never returned to his position at the school.
