= US Amphibious Training Base =

United States Amphibious Training Bases for the US Navy, US Army and US Marine Corps

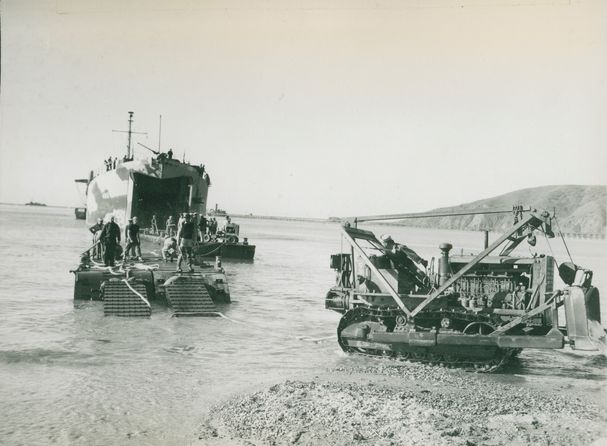
Avila Beach's Amphibious Training Base Morro Bay on March 7, 1944. An amphibious training exercise, with pontoon bridge attached to Landing Ship, Tank. Army Signal Corps photo.

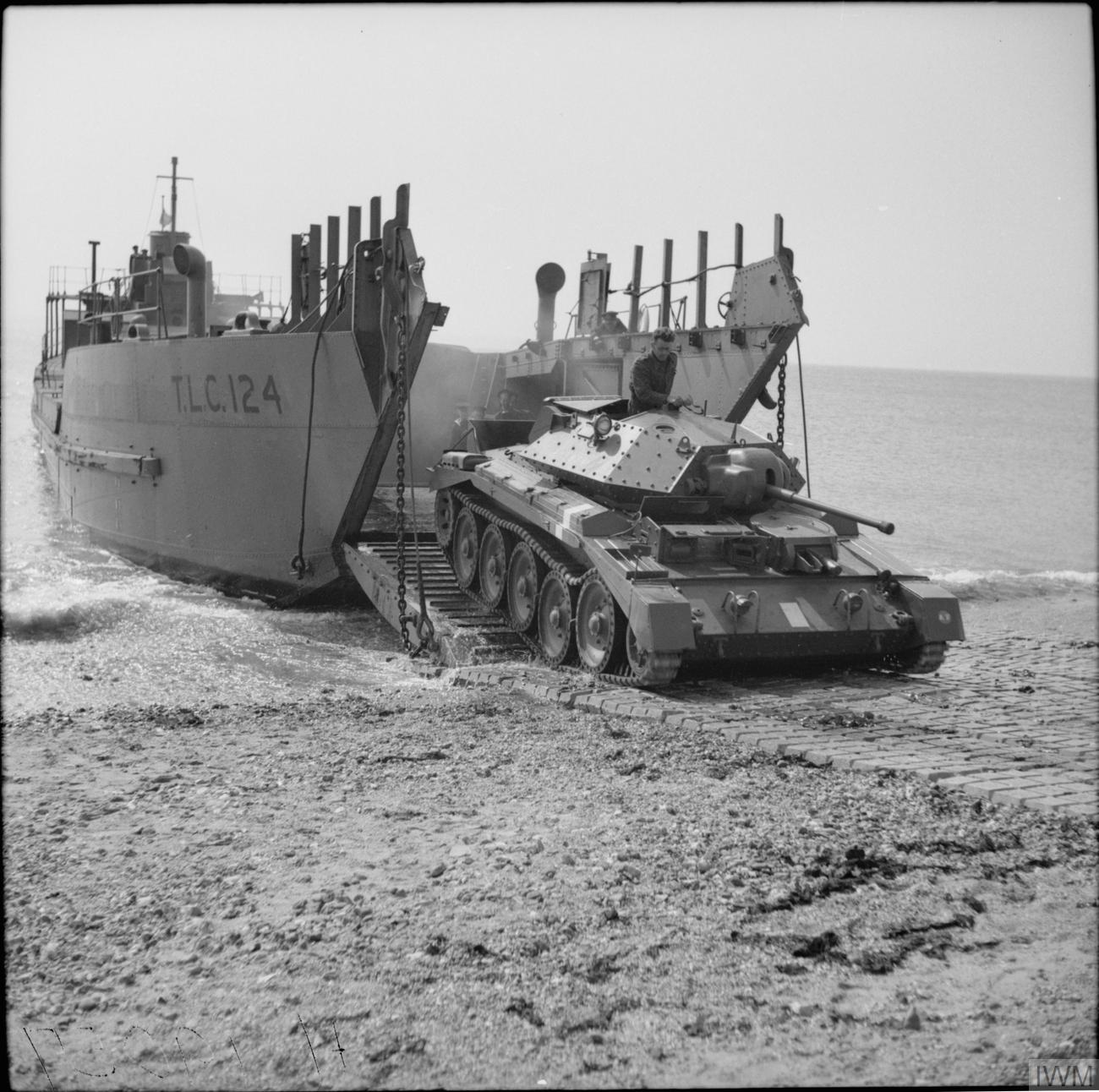
A Crusader tank landing on a beach from a Tank Landing Craft in a 1942 test

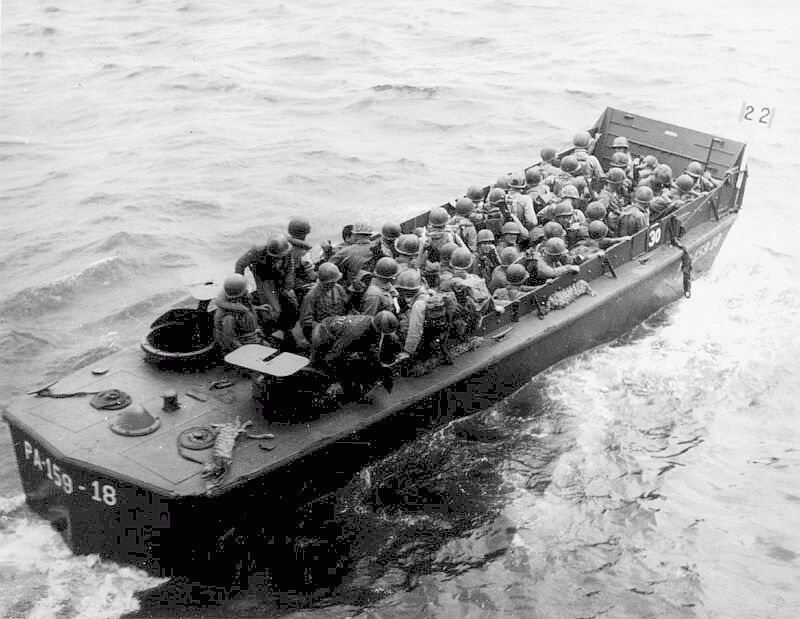
LCVPs, known as 'Higgins Boats', were the first specialized landing craft for the US Navy. Pictured, USS Darke LCVP 18, possibly with Army troops as reinforcements at Okinawa, 1945.

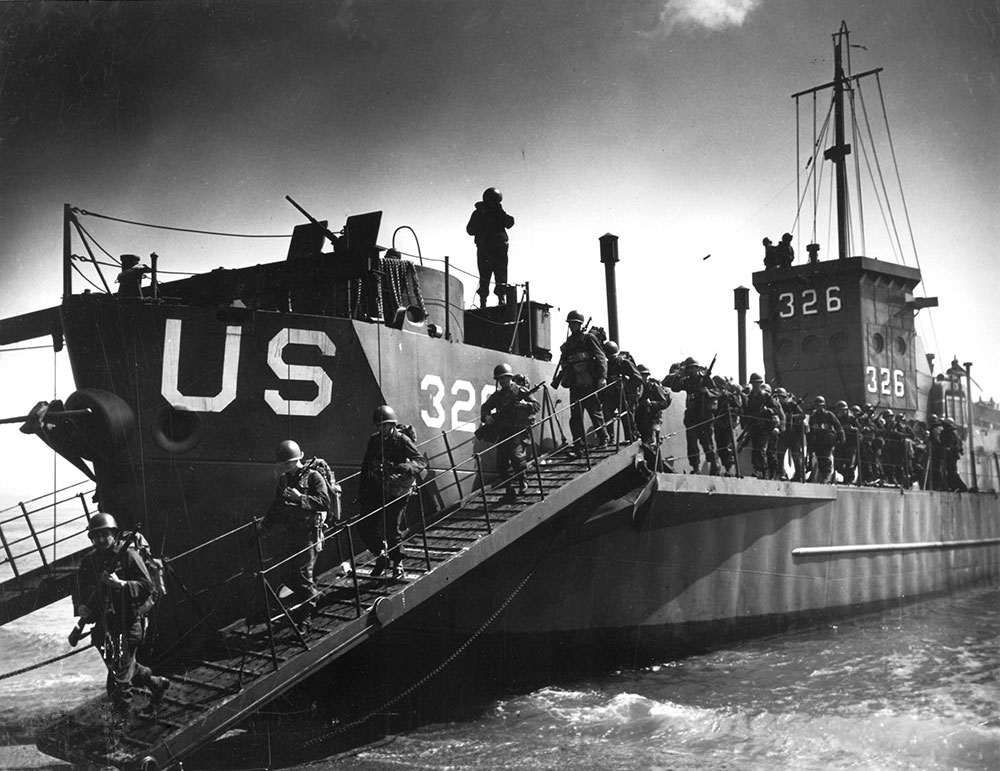
USS LCI-326, a Landing Craft Infantry, during training for D-Day

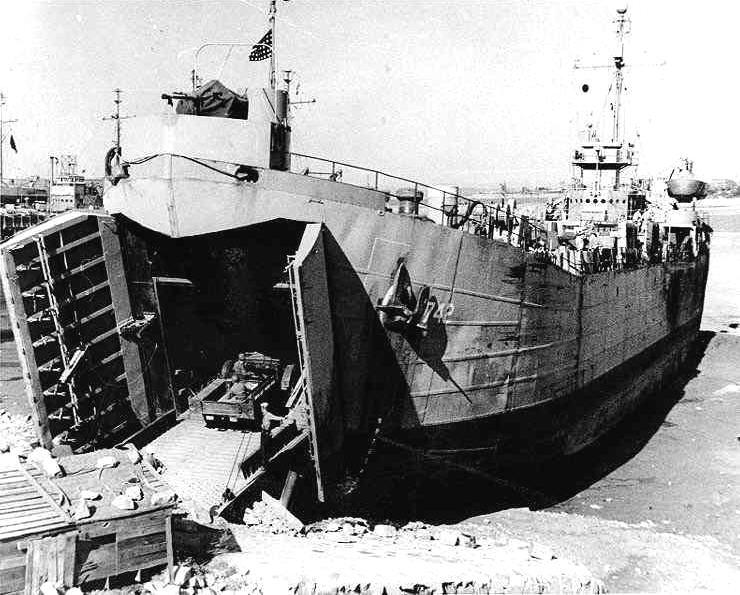
USS LST-742 on 13 October 1950 at Wolmi-do island, Incheon Harbor, South Korea, loading supplies for the upcoming Wonsan invasion

Amphibious Training Base (ATB)(USNATB) Advance Amphibious Training Base are United States Armed Forces bases used for the training of amphibious warfare. Starting with World War II, United States Navy began large-scale amphibious assaults of beaches. To train troops in the use of Amphibious warfare ships and Amphibious Combat Vehicles the Navy established training bases both on the US mainland and overseas at US Naval Advance Bases. The Training involved the United States Navy working with The United States Marine Corps, United States Army and in later years sometimes the United States Air Force for air support.

== Background ==
The United States amphibious operations dates back to the early dates of the nation. On March 3, 1776, the Continental Marines made their first amphibious landing in the Battle of Nassau on to the beaches of the Bahamas. While amphibious operations took place in the American Civil War, Spanish–American War, and World War I, large-scale amphibious training bases were not established till World War II.

Before World War II the need for Amphibious Training Base was seen. In 1903, President Theodore Roosevelt from his experience in the Spanish-American War established a Joint Army-Navy Board in 1903, but no Amphibious Training Base came out of this. One of the first small-scale Amphibious Training took place in Culebra and Vieques, Puerto Rico at the request of the Secretary of the Navy Josephus Daniels in 1913. During World War I, the Gallipoli amphibious operations in Turkey did not go well for the Allies, thus some thought that amphibious warfare was at an end.

After World War I, in which Japan fought on the Allied side, Japan took control of German bases in China and the Pacific. In 1919, the League of Nations approved Japan's mandate over the German islands north of the equator. The United States did not want any mandates and was concerned with Japan's aggressiveness. As such Wilson Administration transferred 200 Atlantic warships to the Pacific Fleet in 1919.

With new concerns in the Pacific, in 1921, Marine Commandant Lieutenant General John A. Lejeune asked Major Earl “Pete” Ellis to make up plans for an amphibious war with Japan, as to be prepared. Ellis wrote OpPlan 712: Advance Base Operations in Micronesia, which outlined modern amphibious warfare. The Fleet Marine Force was founded on December 7, 1933. Fleet Marine Force was a combined Force of both the US Navy and the United States Marine Corps. On December 7, 1941, Japan carried out a surprise military strike on the Naval Base in Pearl Harbor. Japan hoped to eliminate US military force in the Pacific as it soon carried out attacks across the South Pacific. The attack led the US to enter World War II. During World War II the United States was fighting on two fronts, the Pacific War and the European theatre. The Pacific War was an amphibious operation of Island-hopping and the European theatre required amphibious operations to get a foothold on the European continent. European theatre saw major amphibious operations at the invasion of North Africa, Southern France, Sicily, Italy and Normandy.

On January 5, 1942 Seabee Navy Construction Battalions officially began operation. In July 1943 Seabee started an Amphibious Construction Battalion, with Amphibious Construction Battalion 1 as the first unit, which operated in the Pacific War. Seabee were given the task of clearing beaches of obstacles and establishing beachhead bases. In addition, Seabees built and operated sea ports, airfields and served as elements the United States Marine Corps.

This nation's first official naval amphibious training base was established in August 1942 at Solomons, Maryland, USNATB, United States Navy Amphibious Training Base. Other base opened on both coasts of the United States. Due to the demand for Amphibious Training, overseas bases were founded in North Africa and the South Pacific.

The United States Navy needed to train with the US Army and US Marine Corps, as amphibious landing require complex operations:

- Strategic planning
- Amphibious vessels need to arrive and be loaded with all the supplies and troops needed for the operation.
- Must be reconnaissance of the landing site
- Landing site may need obstacles removed, and the water depth checked.
- Landing must be timed to the tide.
- Air cover must be timed to landing.
- Beach checked for landmines and other obstacles.
- After troops and vehicles debark, support supplies are unloaded the beachhead supply depot.

== Underwater Demolition Teams ==
The US Navy's Underwater Demolition Teams are the forerunner to today's United States Navy SEALs, they were founded in December 1943 in Hawaii. The first of 30 World War II teams, was Underwater Demolition Team One, UDT-1 established with UDT-2 in December 1943. The Underwater Demolition Team trained at Amphibious Training Base Kamaole on Maui and Amphibious Training Base Waimanalo at Waimanalo on Oahu.

== Ships and vehicles ==
See also Category:Amphibious warfare vessel classes
Starting in World War II common amphibious ships used were Landing Ship, Tank (LST), Landing Craft Infantry (LCI). Common boats starting in World War II were LCP boats, Landing craft tank and Landing Craft Mechanized boats. Landing Vehicle Tracked (LVT), known as Gators and Buffalos were widely used in the Pacific War from 1942 to 1945. The DUKW, an amphibious truck, was used in all fronts in World War II. An Amphibious jeep was built, but was not as successful as the DUKW. DD tank, a variant of the M4 Sherman was used at Normandy landings with mix results. Post war the US LCU was used for beach landings. The Cadillac Gage Commando saw service in Vietnam War. Current vehicles include the Assault Amphibious Vehicle in service starting 1971 and LAV-25 in service starting in 1983. Landing Craft Air Cushion launched from Amphibious assault ship in service starting 1986. Amphibious assault ships included Harpers Ferry-class dock landing ships, San Antonio-class amphibious transport docks, and Wasp-class amphibious assault ships.

== Current Amphibious Training Bases ==
- Naval Amphibious Base Coronado (1943 – present)
- Joint Expeditionary Base Little Creek–Fort Story (2005–present)
  - Naval Amphibious Base Little Creek - Joint Expeditionary Base–Little Creek - Amphibious Training Base Camp Bradford (1942 – present)
  - Joint Expeditionary Base Fort Story - US Army (1914–present)
- Marine Corps Base Camp Lejeune - US Marines (1942–present)
- Marine Corps Base Camp Pendleton - US Marines (1942 – present)
- Amphibious Training Base Waimānalo now Marine Corps Training Area Bellows (1999–present)
- Amphibious Training Base at Naval Base Okinawa (1999 – present)
  - Special Amphibious Training events are held around the world, some are joint events with other nations.

== Closed Amphibious Training Bases ==
=== In the United States ===
- Naval Amphibious Training Base Solomons at Solomons, Maryland (1942-1945)`
- Amphibious Training Base Morro Bay (1941–1945)
- Naval Amphibious Training Base Fort Pierce (1943-1946)
- Amphibious Training Base, Castroville - Castroville, California (1942-1945)
- Amphibious Training Base Kamaole -Naval Base Hawaii (1943-1945)
- Amphibious Training Base Waimanalo - Naval Base Hawaii (1943-1945)
- Waipio Peninsula Amphibious Base - Naval Base Hawaii (1943-1945)
- Advanced Amphibious Training Base Ocracoke (AATB) Ocracoke, North Carolina (1943-1946)
- Camp Garcia Vieques - US Marines (1913, 1960–2003)
- Amphibious Training Center
  - Camp Edwards (1942-1945)
  - Camp Gordon Johnston (1942 - 1946)
  - Fort Lewis (Camp 1917–present) (Amphibious Training Center 1942 - 1945)

=== In Africa ===
US Naval Bases North Africa:

- Ténès Naval Base (1942-1945)
- Béni Saf Naval Base (1942-1945)
- Bizerte Naval Base (1942-1945)
- Tunis Naval Base (1942-1945)
- Ferryville Naval Base (1942-1945)

=== In the Pacific ===
US Naval Advance Bases:

- Naval Base Cairns Australia (1943 - 1945) (now HMAS Cairns (naval base)
- Amphibious Training Base Sandstone Point, Queensland Australia (1943 - 1945)
- Port Stephens amphibious landing training base-HMAS Assault Australia shared (1943 - 1945)
- Training Centre Toorbul Point at Sandstone Point, Queensland Australia shared (1943 - 1945)
- Amphibious Training Base Milne Bay Swinger Bay Alotau Base, Papua New Guinea (1942 - 1945) Amphibious Construction Battalion 2
- Māhia Peninsula Amphibious Training beach in New Zealand (1942-1945)
- Petone landing beach training at Eastbourne, New Zealand (1942-1945)

=== In the United Kingdom ===
- HMS Rosneath at Argyll and Bute, Scotland, US operated base. Also Seabee base. (1942-1945)

Combined Operations Amphibious Training Base with Royal Navy in west of Scotland and the south of England (1943-1944):

- Amphibious Training Base Crow Point in Devon, England pre D-Day 1943-44
- Amphibious Training Base Woolacombe Beach Devon, England pre D-Day 1943
- HMS Dundonald Troon Scotland
- Dundonald Air Station in South Ayrshire, Scotland, also used for amphibious landing training
- HMS Dinosaur I, HQ for tank landing craft training, Troon, Ayrshire Scotland
- HMS Stopford at West Lothian Scotland, landing craft base
- Port Glasgow Scotland, Landing Craft Maintenance base
- HMS Mylodon at Lowestoft England, Landing Craft base
- HMS Woolverstone at Ipswich England, Landing Craft base
- HMS Helder at Brightlingsea England, Landing Craft training base
- HMS Westcliff at Southend England, Landing Craft training base
- HMS Lizard at Shoreham, England, Landing Craft training base
- HMS Mastodon, England, Combined Ops base for landing craft
- HMS Northney, England, Base I, II, III & IV Training establishment for landing craft and Combined Ops camp
- Dartmouth III at Dartmouth, England, Combined Operations Boat Training
- HMS St Clement at Coalhouse Fort, Tilbury, Essex, England, Combined Operations base

== Photo gallery ==
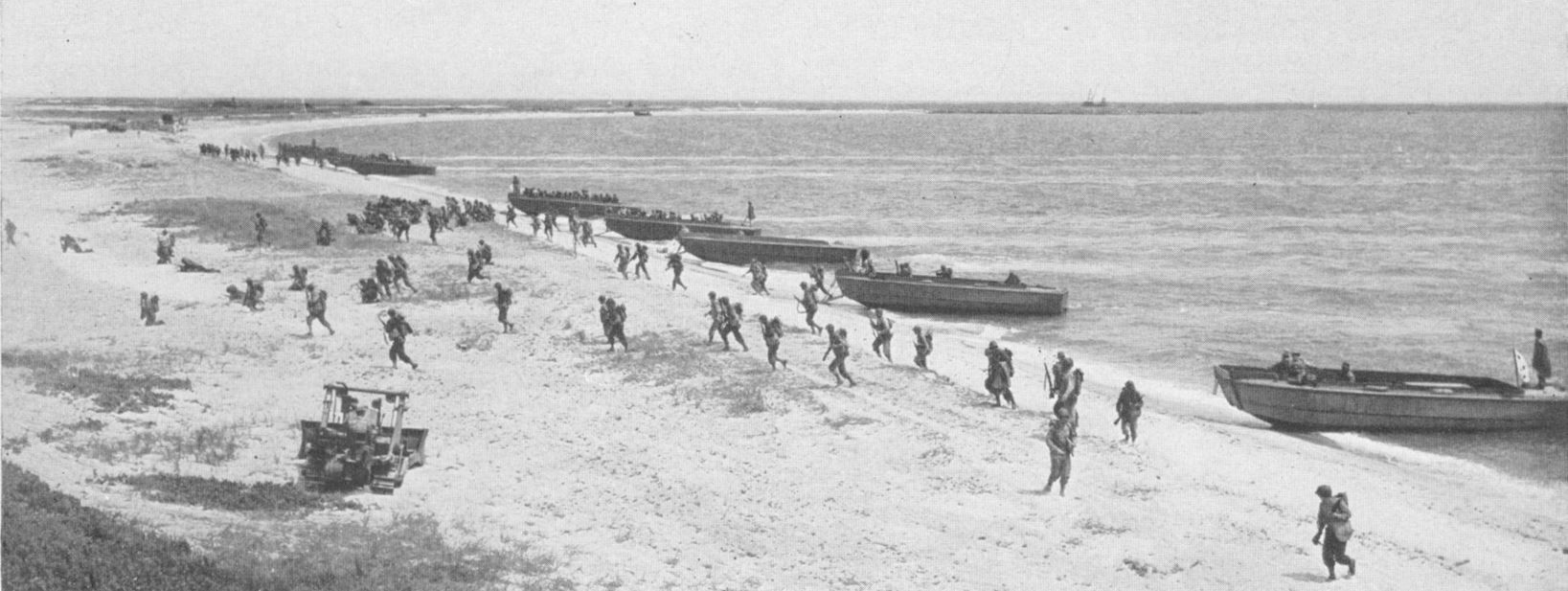
Amphibian engineers land 45th Division troops at Cape Cod in 1942

1006th Seabees in the Salerno Invasion,Operation Avalanche, unloading an LST ship over a Pontoon Causeway at Safta Beach in September 1943. The ship had trained and loaded with the Pontoon Causeway at an US Naval Bases North Africa Amphibious Training Bases

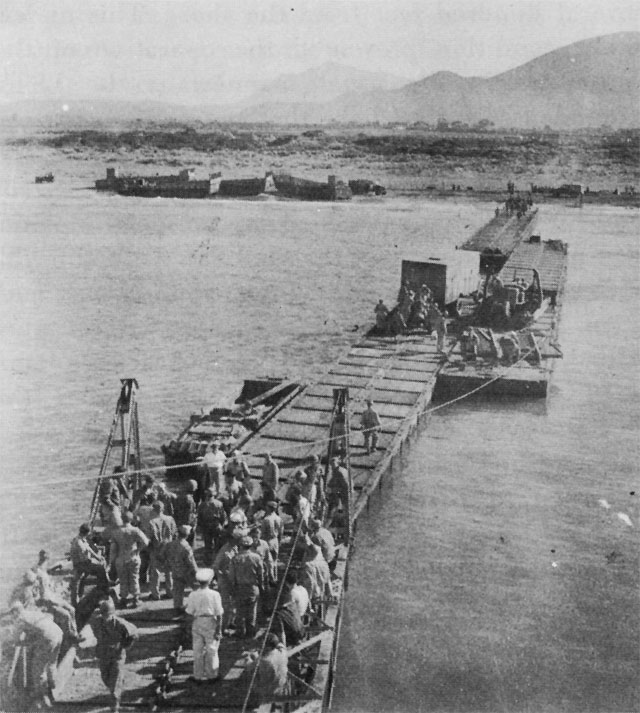
1006th Seabees using a Three-Section Pontoon Causeway at Safta Beach in September 1943.

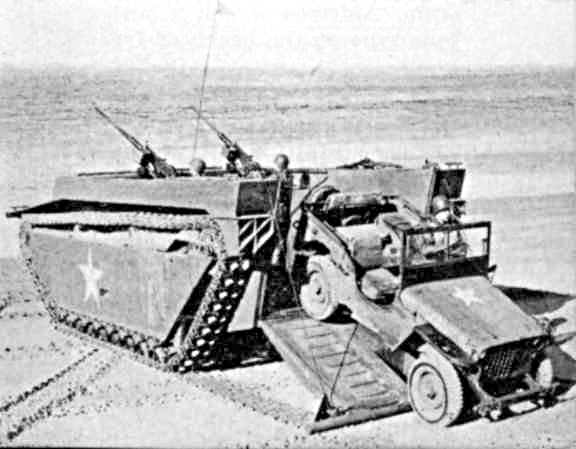
LVT-4 unloading a Jeep

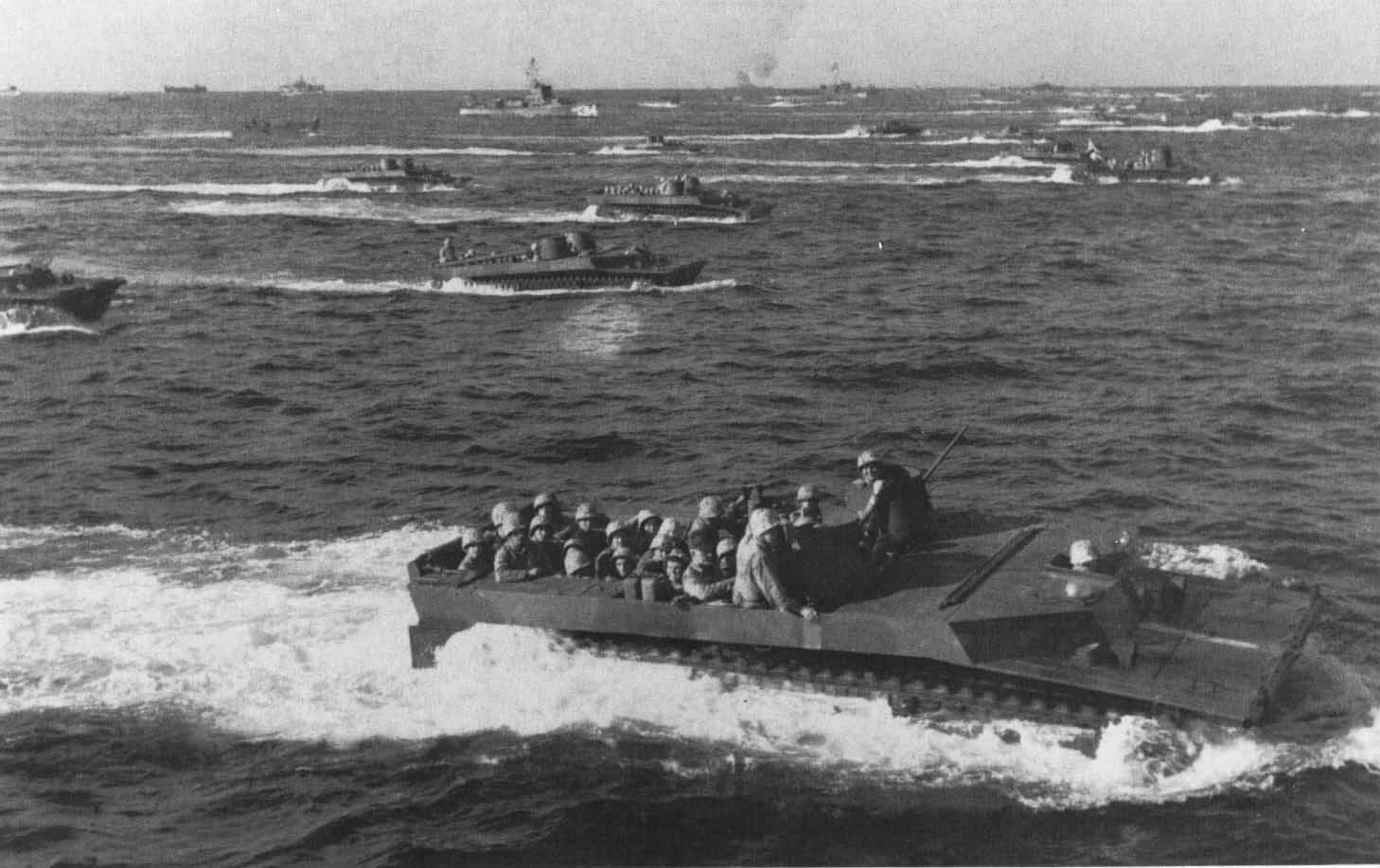
Landing Vehicle Tracked (LVTs) approach Iwo Jima

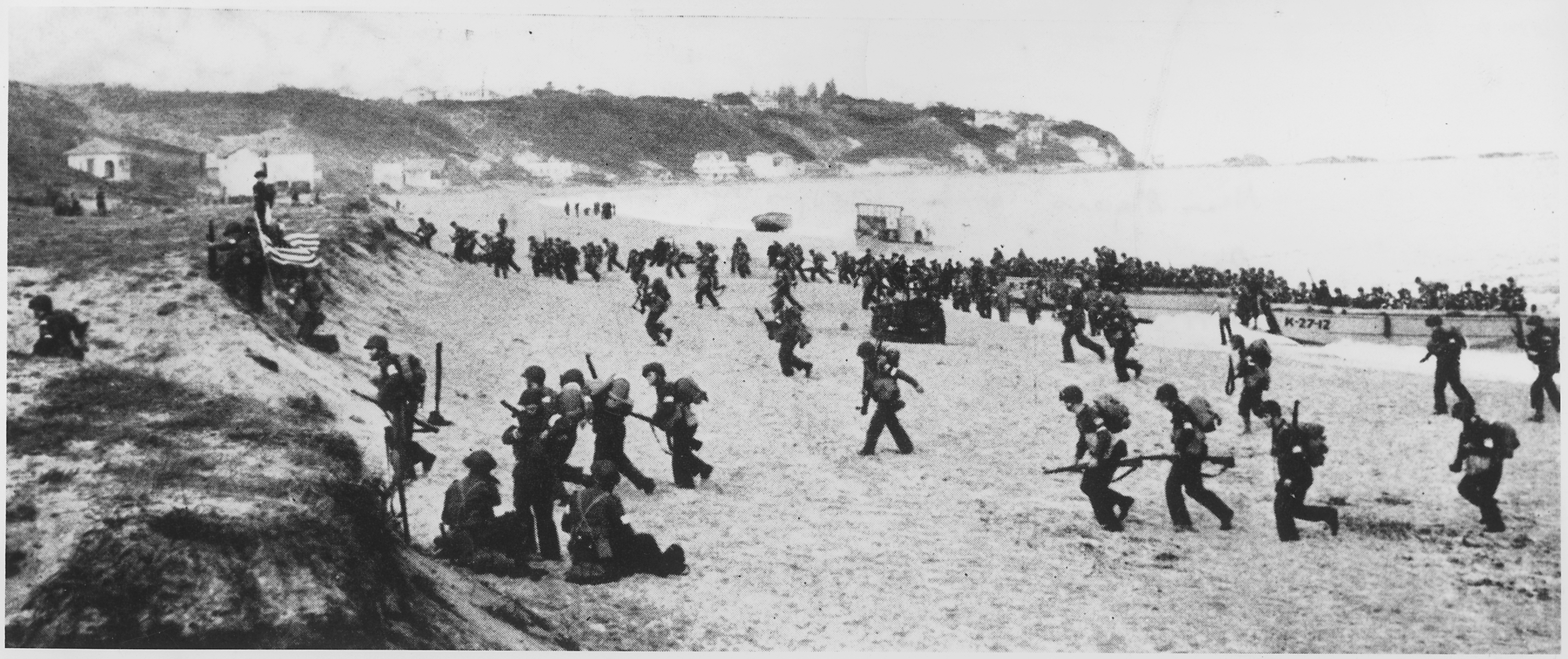
American troops land on an Algerian beach during Operation Torch

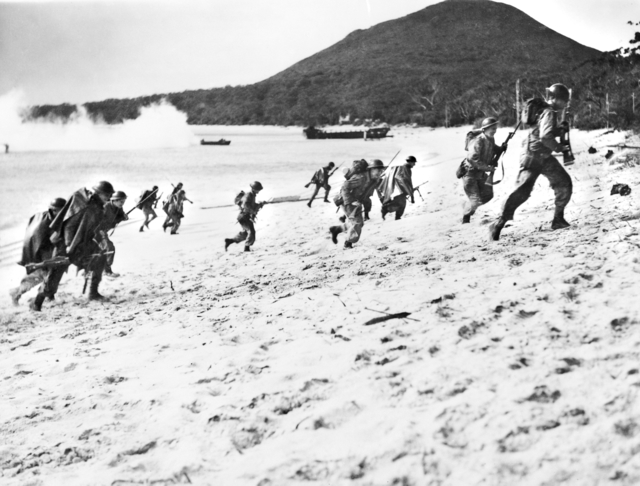
Troops and landing craft crews training at HMAS Assault during World War II

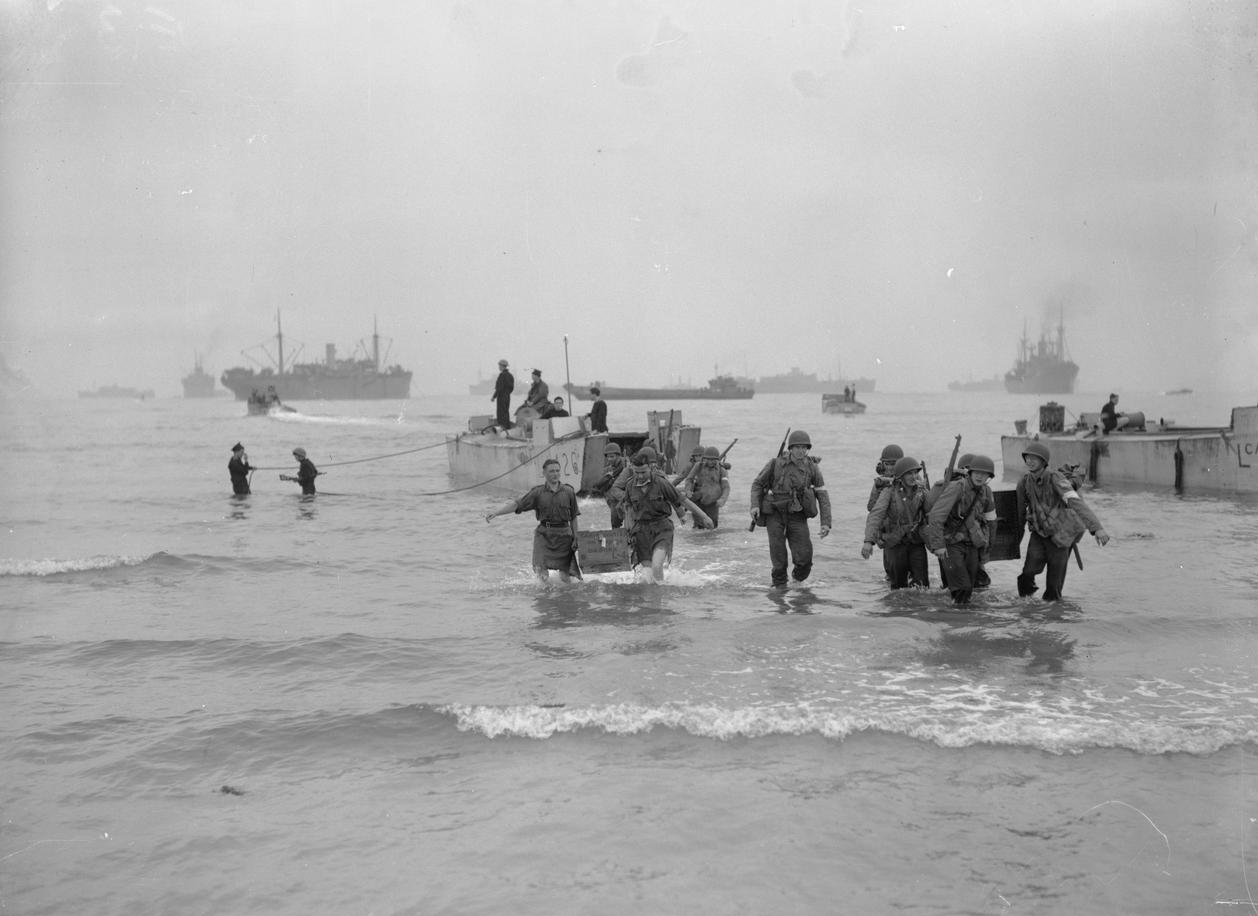
American troops unload stores from LCA 26 at Beach Z, near Arzeu

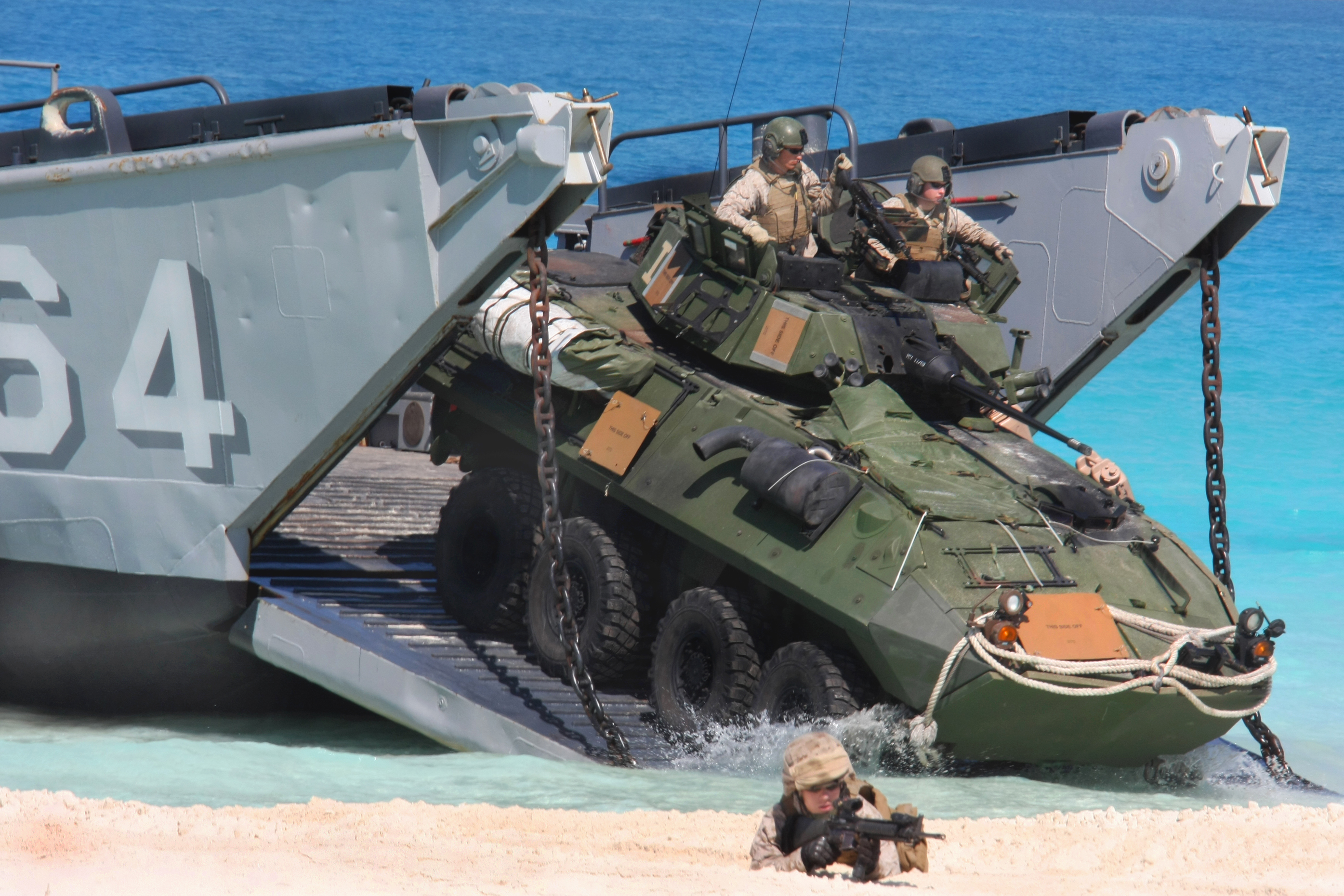
A light-armored vehicle assaults the beach from a landing craft utility from Assault Craft Unit 2 during an amphibious assault demonstration conducted as part of Bright Star 2009, Egypt, Oct. 12, 2009.

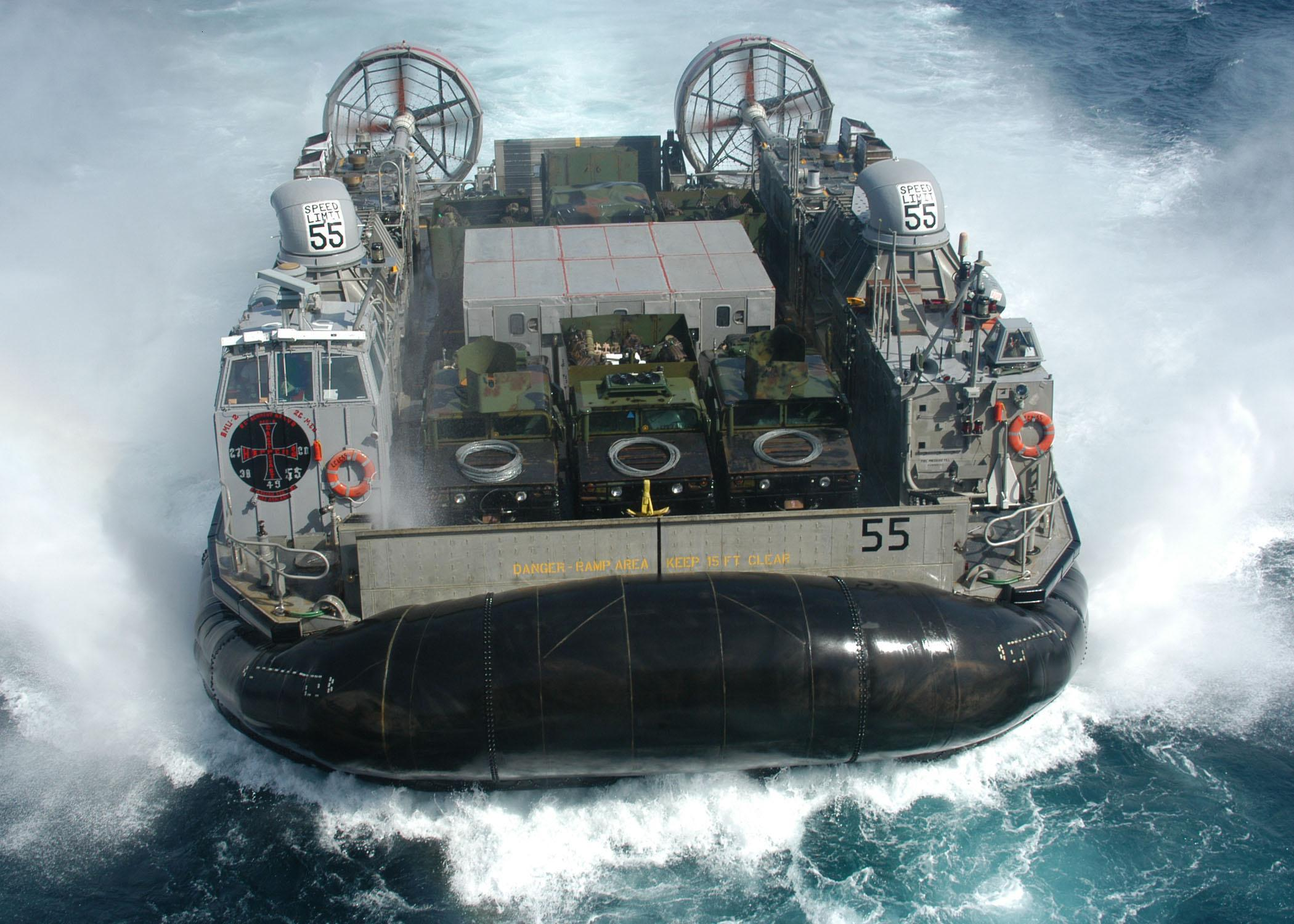
A US Navy LCAC maneuvers to enter the well deck of the amphibious assault ship USS Kearsarge

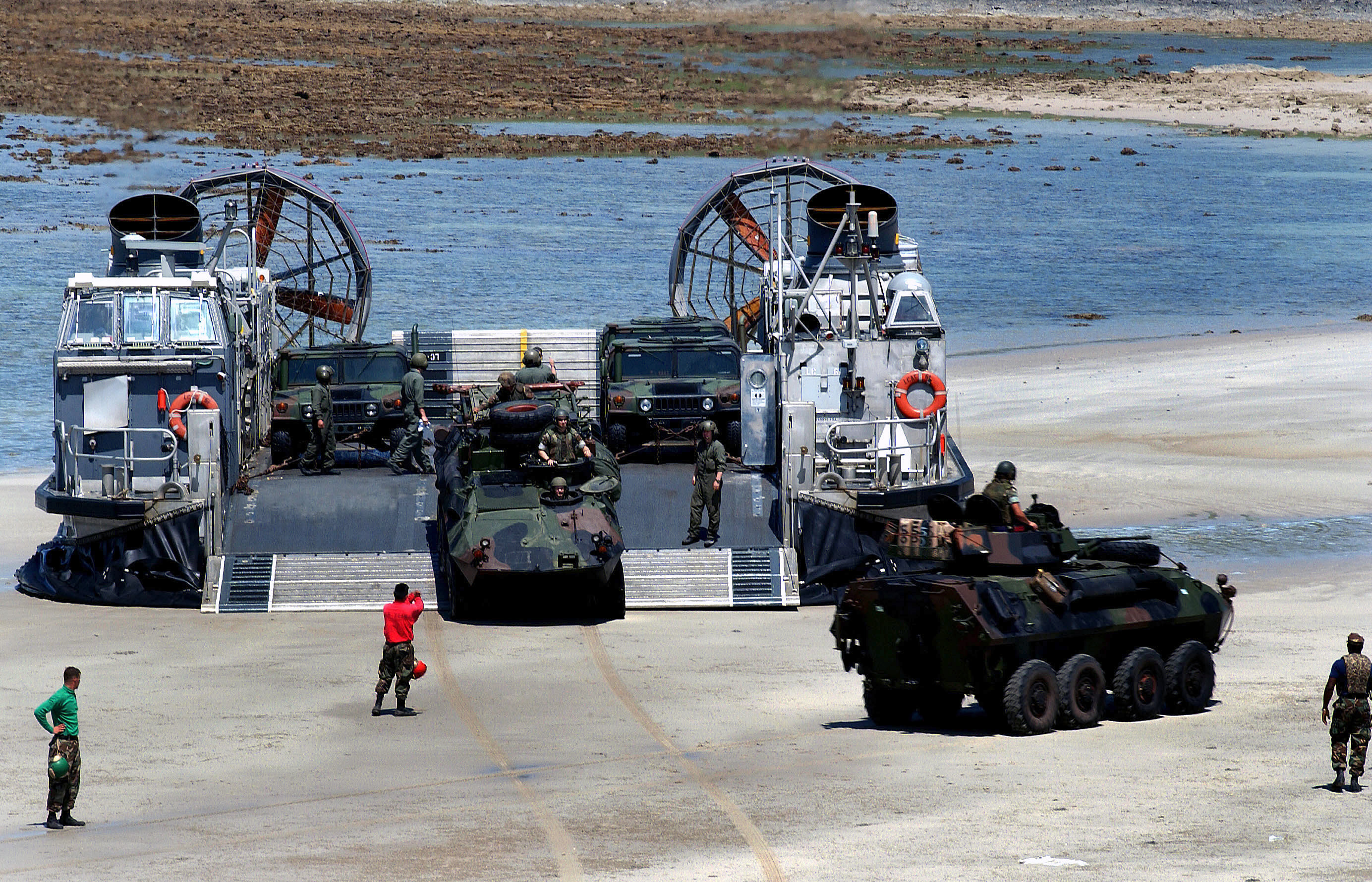
USMC LAV-25s and HMMWVs are offloaded from a USN LCAC craft at Samesan RTMB, Thailand

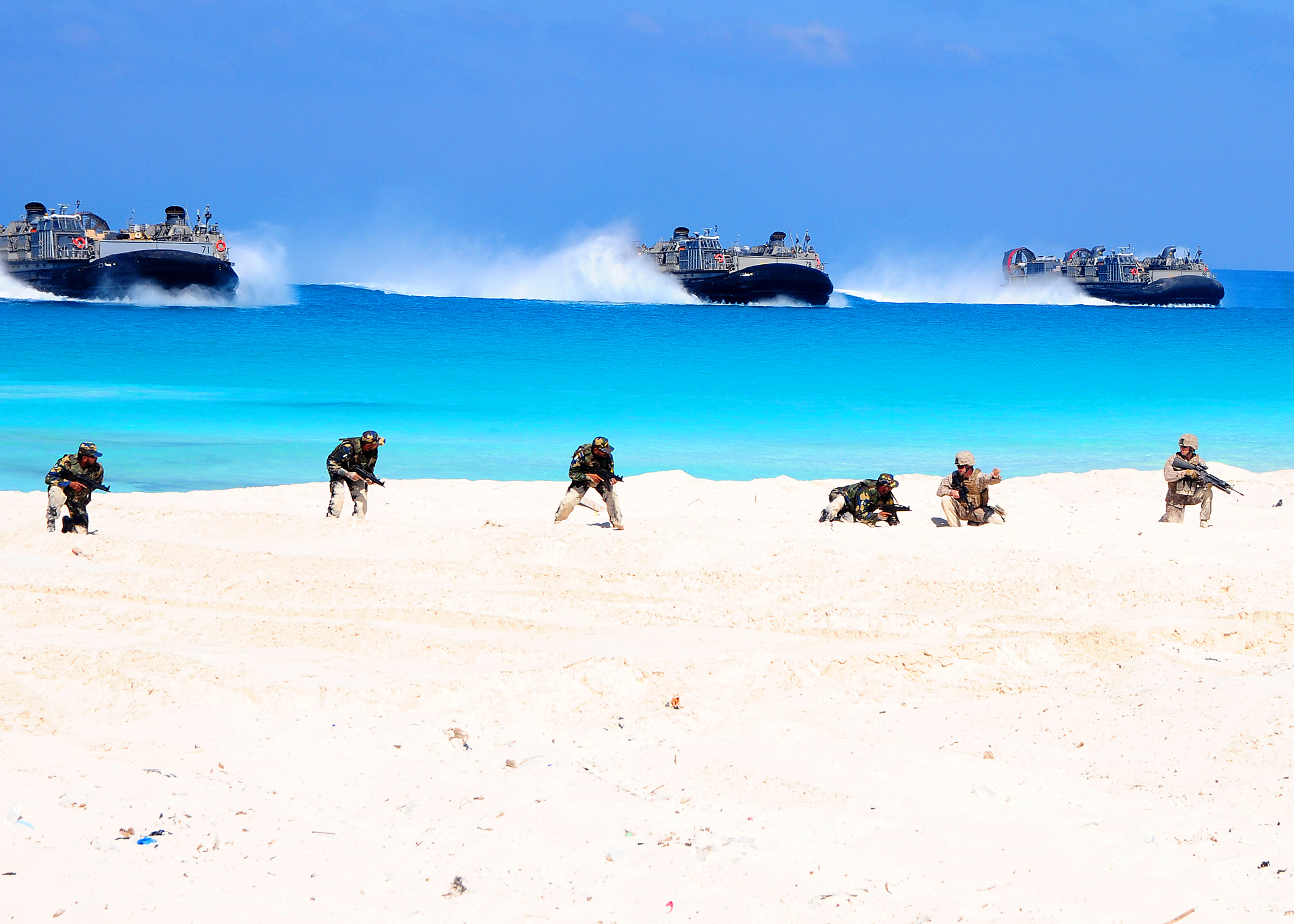
Three LCACs conduct an amphibious assault exercise during Bright Star '09

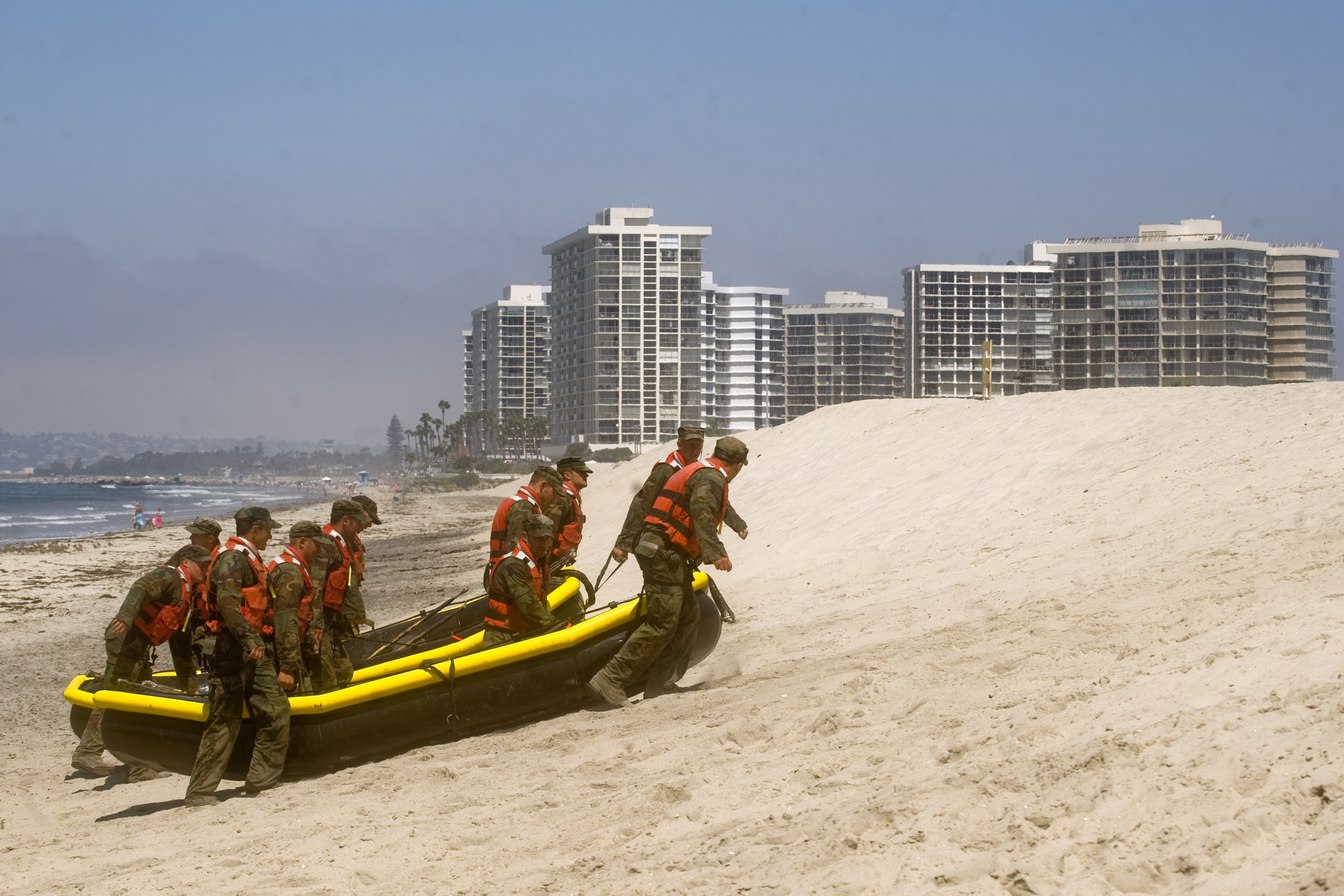
US Navy SEALs training at Naval Special Warfare Center, Naval Amphibious Base Coronado

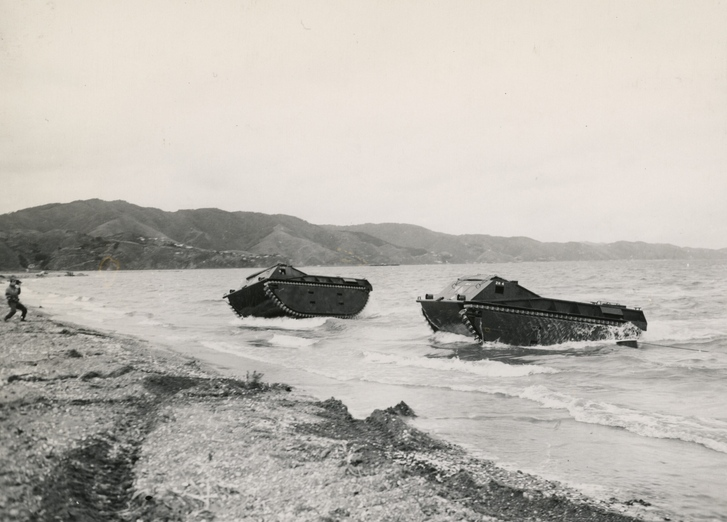
Māhia Peninsula Amphibious Training beach in New Zealand

== See also ==
- United States Marine Corps Reconnaissance Training Company
- United States Navy SEALs
- US Naval Advance Bases
- List of United States Navy shore activities during World War II
- Landing Craft Rubber Large
