= Naaf =

Naaf or NAAF may refer to:

- Naf River
- Naval Auxiliary Air Facility, any of the World War II facilities of the United States Navy listed here
