= Amphibious Training Base, Castroville =

Coordinates: 36.7341°N 121.7980°W

Amphibious Training Base, Castroville also known as Radio Direction Finder Station, Castroville; Naval Radio Station, Castroville; Watsonville Bombing Target Number 8, was a United States Navy military facility located in Castroville, California. From 1942 to 1945 the site was a temporary US Amphibious Training Base. It was used by the US Army, US Navy and US Coast Guard until 1972.

== History ==
US Army Corps of Engineers History opened the base on September 15, 1942. The base provided fleet communication and radio direction finding for the ships off the California Coast during World War 2. The South San Francisco Naval Security Group moved to Castroville in March 1943. On 29 April 1944 a bombing target range was opened northwest of the base. This was used by Naval Air Auxiliary Station Watsonville. After the war on 1 July 1945 the base was transferred to the United States Coast Guard. On 14 May 1958 the site was transferred the US Army to test amphibious logistical vehicles. On 27 June 1973 some of the land became the Salinas River National Wildlife Refuge.
