= Solomons United Methodist Church =

Church in Maryland, United States

Coordinates: 38°19′23.74″N 76°27′36.14″W

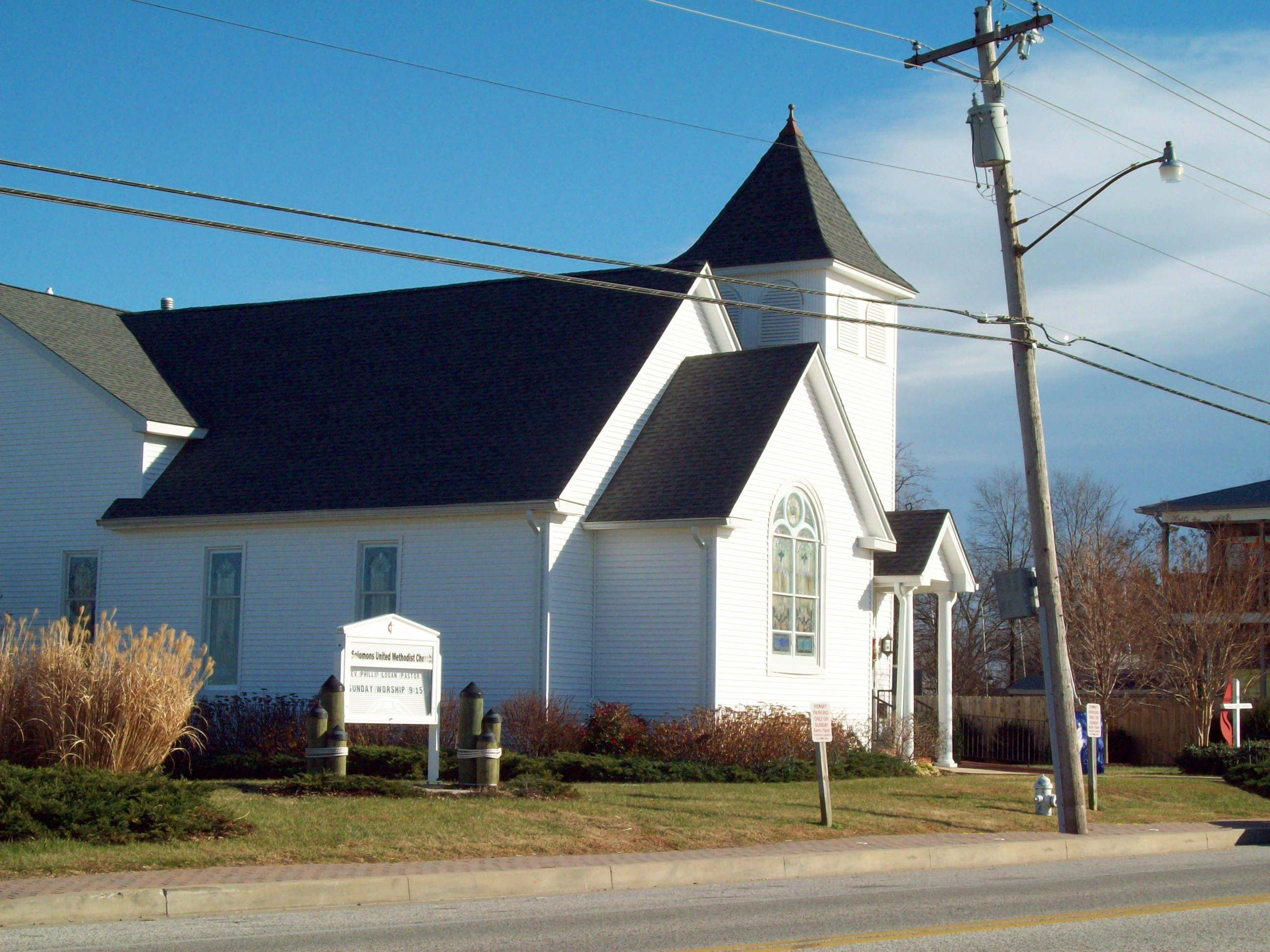

General information
- Location: 14454 Solomon's Island Road, South, Solomons, Maryland, United States
- Completed: 1870

Solomons United Methodist Church is an historic United Methodist church building located at 14454 Solomon's Island Road, South, in Solomons, Calvert County, Maryland. The current pastor is the Rev. Dottie Yunger.
