= Our Lady Star of the Sea Catholic Church (Solomons, Maryland) =

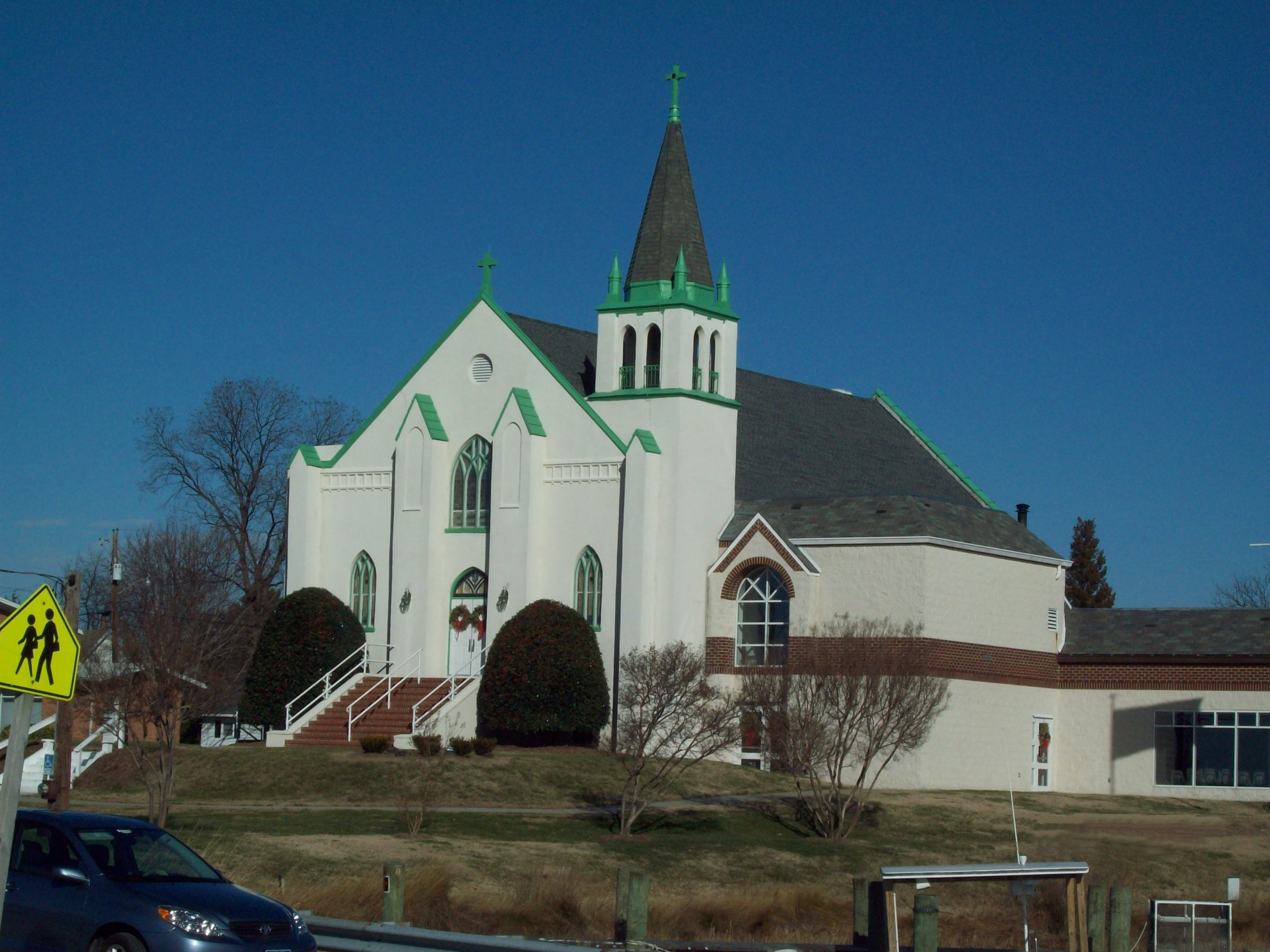
- Our Lady Star of the Sea Catholic Church
- Our Lady Star of the Sea Catholic Church
- 38.324649°N 76.458659°W
- Location: 14400 Solomon's Island Road, Solomons, Maryland
- Country: United States
- Denomination: Roman Catholic

Architecture
- Style: Gothic Revival with Art Deco features
- Completed: 1927

Administration
- Archdiocese: Washington

Our Lady Star of the Sea Catholic Church, built in 1927 in a mixed Art Deco and late Gothic Revival architectural style, is an historic Roman Catholic church located at 14400 Solomon's Island Road, South in Solomons, Calvert County, Maryland. Established in 1888, the parish is the oldest Catholic parish in Calvert County and its 1927 church building is the oldest Catholic church building in the county. It is part of the Roman Catholic Archdiocese of Washington. The Rev. Richard Gardiner served as pastor until 2011.

== Monsignor Michael Wilson ==
In 2011 Msgr. Michael Wilson became the new pastor upon the retirement of Rev. Richard Gardiner. He also served as pastor at Immaculate Heart of Mary Church, a small Catholic church in St. Mary's County, Maryland. Msgr. Wilson retired in 2019.

== Father Kenneth J. Gill ==
Effective 10 July 2019, Father Kenneth J. Gill was appointed as the pastor of the church by Washington Archbishop Wilton Gregory.

== Father Robert F Kilner ==
Fr. Robert (Bob) Kilner was appointed as Administrator of Our Lady Star of the Sea by Cardinal Wilton Gregory. His first day serving the parish was July 6, 2022. Fr. Kilner is the youngest priest to serve as pastor in the history of the parish.

== School ==
The Parish supports a school, Our Lady Star of the Sea School. A Catholic, co-educational school that educates children from Pre-Kindergarten through Eighth Grade.
