= List of United States Navy shore activities during World War II =

During World War II, the United States Navy had a large contingent of operations based on land.

== Academies ==
- Naval Academy Preparatory School, United States Naval Training Center Bainbridge

== Advisors ==
- Naval Advisor, War Production Board Office, Baltimore, Maryland
- Naval Advisor to Contract Distribution, Branch Office, War Production Board. Little Rock, Arkansas
- Naval Advisor to Division of Contract Distribution, War Production Board, Birmingham, Alabama
- Naval Advisor to War Production Board, Indianapolis, Indiana
- Naval Advisor to the War Production Board, Birmingham, Alabama
- Naval Advisor to the War Production Board, New Orleans, Louisiana
- Naval Advisor to the War Production Board, Springfield, Massachusetts
- Naval Advisor, War Production Board, Little Rock, Arkansas

== Air Centers ==
- Naval Air Center, Hampton Roads, Virginia
- Naval Air Center, Hawaii
- Naval Air Center, San Diego, California
- Naval Air Center, Seattle, Washington

== Air Facilities ==
- Naval Air Facility Attu, Alaska
- Naval Air Facility Columbus, Ohio
- Naval Air Facility Middle River, Maryland
- Naval Air Facility Newport, Rhode Island
- Naval Air Facility United States Naval Academy, Annapolis, Maryland

== Air Stations ==
- Naval Air Station Astoria, Oregon
- Naval Air Station Banana River, Florida
- Naval Air Station Brunswick, Maine
- Naval Air Station Bunker Hill, Indiana
- Naval Air Station Cape May, New Jersey
- Naval Air Station Charleston, South Carolina
- Naval Air Station Clinton, Oklahoma
- Naval Air Station Coco Solo, Panama
- Naval Air Station Conroe, Texas
- Naval Air Station Dallas, Texas
- Naval Air Station Daytona Beach, Florida
- Naval Air Station Elizabeth City, North Carolina
- Naval Air Station Galveston, Texas
- Naval Air Station Grosse Ile, Michigan
- Naval Air Station Hitchcock, Texas
- Naval Air Station Houma, Louisiana
- Naval Air Station Hutchinson, Kansas
- Naval Air Station Isla Grande, Puerto Rico
- Naval Air Station Jacksonville, Florida
- Naval Air Station Key West, Florida
- Naval Air Station Klamath Falls, Oregon
- Naval Air Station Lakehurst, New Jersey
- Naval Air Station Litchfield Park, Arizona
- Naval Air Station New York
- Naval Air Station Memphis, Tennessee
- Naval Air Station Miami, Florida
- Naval Air Station New Orleans, Louisiana
- Naval Air Station Norfolk, Virginia
- Naval Air Station Norman, Oklahoma
- Naval Air Station Oceana, Virginia Beach, Virginia
- Naval Air Station Olathe, Kansas
- Naval Air Station Ottumwa, Iowa
- Naval Air Station Pasco, Washington
- Naval Air Station Patuxent River, Maryland
- Naval Air Station Quonset Point, Rhode Island
- Naval Air Station Richmond, Florida
- Naval Air Station Roosevelt Roads, Puerto Rico
- Naval Air Station San Diego, California
- Naval Air Station San Pedro, California
- Naval Air Station San Juan, Puerto Rico (see Naval Air Station Isla Grande)
- Naval Air Station Seattle, Washington
- Naval Air Station South Weymouth, Massachusetts
- Naval Air Station Squantum, Massachusetts
- Naval Air Station Tillamook, Oregon
- Naval Air Station Tongue Point, Oregon
- Naval Air Station Whidbey Island, Washington

== Air Training ==
=== Bases ===
- Naval Air Training Bases, Corpus Christi, Texas

=== Centers ===
- Naval Air Training Center, Corpus Christi, Texas
- Naval Air Training Center, Pensacola, Florida

=== Intermediate ===
- Naval Air Intermediate Training, Pensacola, Florida

=== Primary ===
- Naval Air Primary Training, Kansas City, Kansas

=== Technical ===
- Naval Air Technical Training (Chicago, Illinois)
- Naval Air Technical Training Center (Memphis, Tennessee)
- Naval Air Technical Training Center (Norman, Oklahoma)

== Air Delivery ==
- Naval Aircraft Delivery Unit, Port Columbus, Ohio

== Airship Supply ==
- Naval Airship Supply Center, Naval Air Station Lakehurst, New Jersey

== Ammunition Depots ==
- Naval Ammunition Depot, Charleston, Goose Creek, South Carolina
- Naval Ammunition Depot, Crane, Crane, Indiana
- Naval Ammunition Depot, Dover, Dover (Lake Denmark), New Jersey
- Naval Ammunition Depot, Earle, Earle, New Jersey
- Naval Ammunition Depot, Hastings, Hastings, Nebraska
- Naval Ammunition Depot, New Orleans, New Orleans, Louisiana
- Naval Ammunition Depot, Puget Sound, Puget Sound, Washington
- Naval Ammunition Depot, Sabana Seca, Puerto Rico

== Ammunition ==
=== Schools ===
==== Handling ====
- Naval Ammunition Handling School, Hingham, Massachusetts

==== Packaging ====
- Naval Ammunition Packaging School (Palletizing), Hingham, Massachusetts

=== Laboratories ===
- Naval Materials Handling Laboratory, Hingham, Massachusetts

== Amphibious Training Bases ==
- Naval Amphibious Training Base Fort Pierce, Fort Pierce, Florida
- Naval Amphibious Training Base Solomons, Solomons Island, Maryland

== Attaches ==
- Naval Attache, London

== Auxiliary Air Facilities ==
Naval Auxiliary Air Facility Ayer

- Naval Auxiliary Air Facility Ayer, Massachusetts
- Naval Auxiliary Air Facility Bar Harbor, Maine
- Naval Auxiliary Air Facility Beverly, Massachusetts
- Naval Auxiliary Air Facility Creeds, Virginia Beach, Virginia
- Naval Auxiliary Air Facility Fentress, Virginia Beach, Virginia
- Naval Auxiliary Air Facility Groton, Connecticut
- Naval Auxiliary Air Facility Hyannis, Massachusetts
- Naval Auxiliary Air Facility Lakeview, Oregon
- Naval Auxiliary Air Facility Lewiston, Maine
- Naval Auxiliary Air Facility Long Island, Casco Bay, Maine
- Naval Auxiliary Air Facility Martha's Vineyard, Massachusetts
- Naval Auxiliary Air Facility Monogram, Driver, Virginia
- Naval Auxiliary Air Facility Nantucket, Massachusetts
- Naval Auxiliary Air Facility New Bedford, Massachusetts
- Naval Auxiliary Air Facility Otis Field, Camp Edwards, Massachusetts
- Naval Auxiliary Air Facility Sanford, Maine
- Naval Auxiliary Air Station-Arlington, Washington
- Naval Auxiliary Air Station Charlestown, Rhode Island
- Naval Auxiliary Air Station Clatsop County, Oregon
- Naval Auxiliary Air Station Corvallis, Oregon
- Naval Auxiliary Air Station North Bend, Oregon
- Naval Auxiliary Air Facility Pungo, Virginia Beach, Virginia
- Naval Auxiliary Air Station Quillayute, Washington
- Naval Auxiliary Air Station Rodd Field, Texas
- Naval Auxiliary Air Station Shelton, Washington

== Aviation Supply Offices ==
- Naval Aviation Supply Office, Philadelphia, Philadelphia, Pennsylvania

== Bases ==
- Naval Station Argentia, Argentia, Newfoundland
- Naval Base, Bermuda
- Naval Base, Cape May, Cape May, New Jersey
- Naval Base Cavite, Cavite, Philippine Islands
- Naval Base, Chagaramus, Chagaramus, Trinidad
- Charleston Naval Base, North Charleston, South Carolina
- Naval Base, Funafuti, Funafuti, Ellice Islands
- Naval Base, Newport, Newport, Rhode Island
- Norfolk Naval Base, Norfolk, Virginia
- Naval Weapons Station Yorktown, Yorktown, Virginia
- Naval Base, Pearl Harbor, Hawaii

== Cargo Handling ==
- Naval Cargo Handling Unit, South Boston, South Boston, Massachusetts

== Code and Signal ==
- Naval Code and Signal Laboratory, Washington, D.C.

== Commands ==
- Naval Air Training Command (NATC), Patuxent River, Maryland
- Naval Air Intermediate Training Command, Corpus Christi, Texas.
- Naval Air Operational Training Command, Jacksonville, Florida
- Naval Air Primary Training Command, Fairfax Airport, Kansas City, Kansas
- Naval Airship Training Command, Lakehurst, New Jersey
- Naval Command, Office of Strategic Services, Washington, D.C.

== Computing ==
- Naval Computing Machine Laboratory, National Cash Register Co., Dayton, Ohio

== Construction Training ==
- Naval Construction Training Center, Quaddy Village, Maine
- Naval Construction Training Center, Davisville, Rhode Island

== Convalescent Hospitals ==
- Naval Convalescent Hospital, Glenwood Springs, Colorado
- Naval Convalescent Hospital, Springfield, Massachusetts

== Dental ==
- Naval Dental School, Bethesda, Maryland

== Dispensary ==
- Naval Dispensary, Boston, Massachusetts
- Naval Dispensary, Solomons Island, Maryland
- Naval Dispensary, Woods Hole, Massachusetts
- Naval Dispensary, Miami Beach, Florida

== Dry Docks ==
- Naval Dry Dock, Navy Yard, Boston, Massachusetts
- Naval Dry Dock, South Boston, Massachusetts

== Fuel ==
=== Annexs ===
- Naval Fuel Annex, Navy Supply Pier, Portland, Maine
- Naval Fuel Annex, Navy Yard, Boston, Massachusetts

=== Depots ===
- Naval Fuel Depot, Boston, Massachusetts
- Naval Fuel Depot, Orient Heights, East Boston, Massachusetts
- Naval Fuel Depot, Puget Sound, Manchester, Washington

== Hospitals ==
- Naval Hospital, Chelsea, Massachusetts
- Naval Hospital Corps School (WR), Bethesda, Maryland

== Hydrographic Offices ==
- Naval Hydrographic Distributing Office, New Orleans, Louisiana

== Ordnance Inspectors ==
- Naval Inspector of Ordnance, Bethlehem Steel, Quincy, Massachusetts
- Naval Inspector of Ordnance, Excell Foundry and Machine, Fall River, Massachusetts
- Naval Inspector of Ordnance, Quincy, Massachusetts

== Intelligence ==
- Naval Intelligence Office, Naval Reserve Armory, Indianapolis, Indiana
- Naval Liaison Office, Monroe, Louisiana
- Naval Local Defense Force, Boston Section, Boston, Massachusetts
- Naval Magazine, Theodore, Alabama

== Material Handling ==
- Naval Materials Handling Laboratory, Hingham, Massachusetts

== Medical Work ==
- Naval Medical Research Institute, Bethesda, Maryland
- Naval Medical School, Bethesda, Maryland
- Naval Medical Storehouse, New Orleans, Louisiana

== Mine Work ==
- Naval Mine Defense Laboratory, Panama City, Florida
- Naval Mine Development Detachment, Key West, Florida
- Naval Mine Test Facilities, Provincetown, Massachusetts

=== Schools ===
- Naval Mine Warfare School, North Charleston, South Carolina
- Naval Mine Warfare School, Yorktown, Virginia

=== Test Stations ===
- Naval Mine Warfare Test Station, Solomons Island, Maryland

=== Monitoring Stations ===
- Naval Monitoring Station, New Orleans, Louisiana

== Net ==
=== Depots ===
- Naval Net Depot, Boston, Massachusetts
- Naval Net Depot, Indian Island, Washington
- Naval Net Depot, Manchester, Washington
- Naval Net Depot, Puget Sound, Washington

=== Schools ===
- Naval Net School, Tiburon, California

== Observatory ==
- Naval Observatory, Washington, D.C.

== Operating Base ==
- Naval Operating Base, Key West, Florida
- Naval Operating Base, Newport, Rhode Island

== Ordnance ==
=== Laboratories ===
- Naval Ordnance Laboratory Annex, White Oak, Silver Spring, Maryland
- Naval Ordnance Laboratory Experimental Facilities, South River, Maryland
- Naval Ordnance Laboratory, Washington, D.C.

=== Plants ===
- Naval Ordnance Plant, Indianapolis, Indiana
- Naval Ordnance Plant, Louisville, Kentucky
- Naval Ordnance Plant, Shumaker, Arkansas

=== Test Stations ===
- Naval Ordnance Test Station (NOTS), China Lake, California

== Photographic ==
- Naval Photographic Intelligence Center, Washington, D.C.
- Naval Photographic Science Laboratory, Anacostia

== Powder facilities ==
- Naval Powder Factory, Indian Head, Maryland

== Proving Grounds ==
- Naval Proving Ground, Dahlgren, Virginia

== Radio ==
=== Activities ===
- Naval Radio Activities, Bainbridge Island, Port Blakely, Washington

=== Stations ===
- Naval Radio Station, Annapolis, Maryland
- Naval Radio Station, Naval Air Station, Astoria, Oregon
- Naval Radio Station, Boston, Massachusetts
- Naval Radio Station, Chatham, Massachusetts
- Naval Radio Station, Cheltenham, Maryland
- Naval Radio Station, Jupiter, Florida (a.k.a. Station J)
- Naval Radio Station, Keyport, Washington
- Naval Radio Station, New Orleans, Louisiana
- Naval Radio Station, San Juan, Puerto Rico

== Stations ==
- Naval Station, Astoria, Oregon
- Naval Station, Middle and Orchard Points, Manchester, Washington
- Naval Station, Midway Island
- Naval Station, Portland, Maine
- Naval Station, Seattle, Washington
- Naval Station, Tutuila, Samoa
- Naval Station, Wake Island

== Storehouses ==
- Naval Storehouse, Port Covington Terminal, Baltimore, Maryland

== Submarine Operations ==
- Naval Submarine Base, New London, Connecticut
- Naval Submarine Base, Saint Thomas, US Virgin Islands
- Naval Submarine School, New London, Connecticut

== Radio stations ==
- Naval Supplementary Radio Station, Chatham, Massachusetts
- Naval Supplementary Radio Station, Mansett (Seawall) Maine

== Supplies ==
=== Corps Schools ===
- Naval Supply Corps School, Graduate School of Business Administration, Harvard University, Boston, Massachusetts
- Naval Supply Corps School, Graduate School of Business Administration (Radcliff Branch), Harvard University, Boston, Massachusetts
- Naval Supply Corps School, Wellesley College, Wellesley, Massachusetts

=== Depots ===
- Naval Supply Depot, Bayonne Annex, Bayonne, New Jersey
- Naval Supply Depot, Clearfield, Utah
- Naval Supply Depot, New Orleans, Louisiana
- Naval Supply Depot, Seattle, Washington
- Naval Supply Depot, Spokane, Washington

=== Piers ===
- Naval Supply Pier, Casco Bay

== Torpedo Stations ==
- Naval Torpedo Station, Alexandria, Virginia
- Naval Torpedo Station, Keyport, Washington
- Naval Torpedo Station, Newport, Rhode Island

== Training ==
=== Commands ===
- Naval Air Training Command (NATC)

=== Centers ===
- Naval Training Center Bainbridge, Maryland
- Naval Training Center, Boston, Massachusetts
- Naval Training Center, Farragut, Idaho
- Naval Training Center, Great Lakes, Illinois
- Naval Training Center, Naval Repair Base, New Orleans, Louisiana
- Naval Training Center, Portland, Maine

=== Schools ===
- Naval Training School (Aircraft Carrier Gasoline Systems), Manchester, Washington
- Naval Training School (Armed Guard Gunnery), New Orleans, Louisiana
- Naval Training School (Armed Guard Gunnery), Seattle, Washington
- Naval Training School (Ammunition Handling), Lake Union, Seattle, Washington
- Naval Training School (Amphibious Firemen), Iowa State College, Ames, Iowa
- Naval Training School (Aviation Communications), NATTC, Memphis, Tennessee
- Naval Training School (Aviation Engineering Officer), NATTC, Memphis, Tennessee
- Naval Training School (Aviation Radiomen), NATTC, Memphis, Tennessee
- Naval Training School (Basic Engineering), Hampton, Virginia
- Naval Training School (Carpenter's Mates), Hampton, Virginia
- Naval Training School (Communications), Harvard University, Cambridge, Massachusetts
- Naval Training School (Communication WR), Mt. Holyoke College, South Hadley, Massachusetts
- Naval Training School (Cooks & Bakers), Naval Reserve Armory, Indianapolis, Indiana
- Naval Training School (Destroyer Escort), Cleveland, Ohio
- Naval Training School (Diesel), Cleveland, Ohio
- Naval Training School (Diesel), Fairbanks Morse Co., Beloit, Wisconsin
- Naval Training School (Diesel), Hampton, Virginia
- Naval Training School (Diesel), Nordberg Mfg. Co., Milwaukee, Wisconsin
- Naval Training School (Direction Finders & Loran), Naval Station, Portland, Maine
- Naval Training School (Electrical), Bainbridge, Maryland
- Naval Training School (Electrical), Hampton, Virginia
- Naval Training School (Electronics), Boston, Massachusetts
- Naval Training School (Electronics), New Orleans, Louisiana
- Naval Training School (Elementary Electricity and Radio Material), Takoma Park, Maryland
- Naval Training School (Elementary Electricity and Radio Material), Stillwater, Oklahoma
- Naval Training School (Fire-Control-Advanced), Washington, D.C.
- Naval Training School (Fire Controlmen), Bainbridge, Maryland
- Naval Training School (Fire Fighters Modified), New Orleans, Louisiana
- Naval Training School (Gunner's Mates), Naval Reserve Armory, Michigan City, Indiana
- Naval Training School, Harvard University, Cambridge, Massachusetts
- Naval Training School (Instructors), Bainbridge, Maryland
- Naval Training School (Line Maintenance-JRM), Middle River, Maryland
- Naval Training School (Loran), New Orleans, Louisiana
- Naval Training School, Hampton Institute, Hampton, Virginia
- Naval Training School (Indoctrination & Communications), Harvard University, Cambridge, Massachusetts
- Naval Training School (Japanese Language), University of Colorado
- Naval Training School (Laundry), Anacostia, D.C
- Naval Training School (Line Maintenance), NAS, Astoria, Oregon
- Naval Training School (Line Maintenance PBM), NAS, Astoria, Ore
- Naval Training School (Loran), Boston, Massachusetts
- Naval Training School (Machinist's Mates & Metalsmiths), Boston, Massachusetts
- Naval Training School (Machinist Mate), Wentworth Institute, Boston, Massachusetts
- Naval Training School (Motion Picture Operators), Bainbridge, Maryland
- Naval Training School, NAS, Quonset Point, Rhode Island
- Naval Training School (Navigation), M.I.T., Cambridge, Massachusetts
- Naval Training School (Officers Cooks and Stewards), Annapolis, Maryland
- Naval Training School (Oxygen Generation), Boston, Massachusetts
- Naval Training School (Physical Instructors), Bainbridge, Maryland
- Naval Training School (Pre-Radar), Bowdoin College, Brunswick, Maine
- Naval Training School (Pre-Radar), Harvard University, Cambridge, Massachusetts
- Naval Training School (Pre-Radio Material), Michigan City, Indiana
- Naval Training School (Radar), M.I.T., Boston, Massachusetts
- Naval Training School (radio), Bainbridge Island, Puget Sound, Washington
- Naval Training School (Radio), Bainbridge, Maryland
- Naval Training School (Radio), Naval Reserve Armory, Indianapolis, Indiana
- Naval Training School (Radio-Special), Bainbridge Island, Port Blakely, Washington
- Naval Training School (Radio-Women), University of Wisconsin, Madison, Wisconsin
- Naval Training School (Radio-W), Miami University, Oxford, Ohio
- Naval Training School (Recruit Instructors - C), Bainbridge, Maryland
- Naval Training School (Signals), Butler University, Indianapolis, Indiana
- Naval Training School (Sound Motion Picture Technician), Bainbridge, Maryland
- Naval Training School (Turbo-Jet), NATTC, Memphis, Tennessee
- Naval Training School, University of Wisconsin, Madison, Wisconsin
- Naval Training School (Yeoman, Signal and Storekeepers), Toledo, Ohio
- Naval Training Schools, Iowa State College, Ames, Iowa
- Naval Training Schools, M.I.T., Cambridge, Massachusetts
- Naval Training Schools, University of Colorado
- Naval Training Schools (Yeoman) and (Storekeepers), Hampton, Virginia
- Naval Training Station, Newport, Rhode Island

=== Units ===
- Naval Training Unit, Berea College, Berea, Kentucky
- Naval Training Unit (Line Maintenance JM-1), Middle River, Maryland

== Units ==
- Naval Unit, Air Technical Document Research Unit, Camp Ritchie, Maryland
- Naval Unit, Edgewood Arsenal, Edgewood, Maryland
- Naval Unit, Special Projects Division, Chemical Warfare Service, Camp Detrick. Frederick, Maryland
- Naval Unit, Special Projects Division, Chemical Warfare Service, Terre Haute, Indiana
- Naval Unit, Western Chemical Warfare School, Rocky Mountain Arsenal, Colorado

== Miscellaneous ==
- Naval Electronics Laboratory, San Diego, California
- Naval Engineering Experiment Station, Annapolis, Maryland
- Naval Fire Fighter's School, Navy Yard, Boston, Massachusetts
- Naval Flight Test Center, Cedar Point, Maryland
- Naval Frontier Base, Boston, Massachusetts
- Naval Radio Station, Winter Harbor, Maine
- Naval Radio Transmitting Station, Bainbridge Island, Washington
- Naval Recreation Camp, East Brewster, Massachusetts
- Naval Regimental Officers Training Corps, New Orleans, Louisiana
- Naval Repair Base, New Orleans, Louisiana
- Naval Research Laboratory, Washington, D.C
- Naval Reserve Educational Center, New Orleans, Louisiana
- Naval Routing Office, Baltimore, Maryland
- Naval Section Base, Lockwood Basin, Boston, Massachusetts
- Naval Senior Advisor to the War Production Board, Boston, Massachusetts
