= Naval Amphibious Training Base Solomons =

United States Amphibious Training Base during World War II

- Part of US Navy
- Solomons, Maryland, U.S.
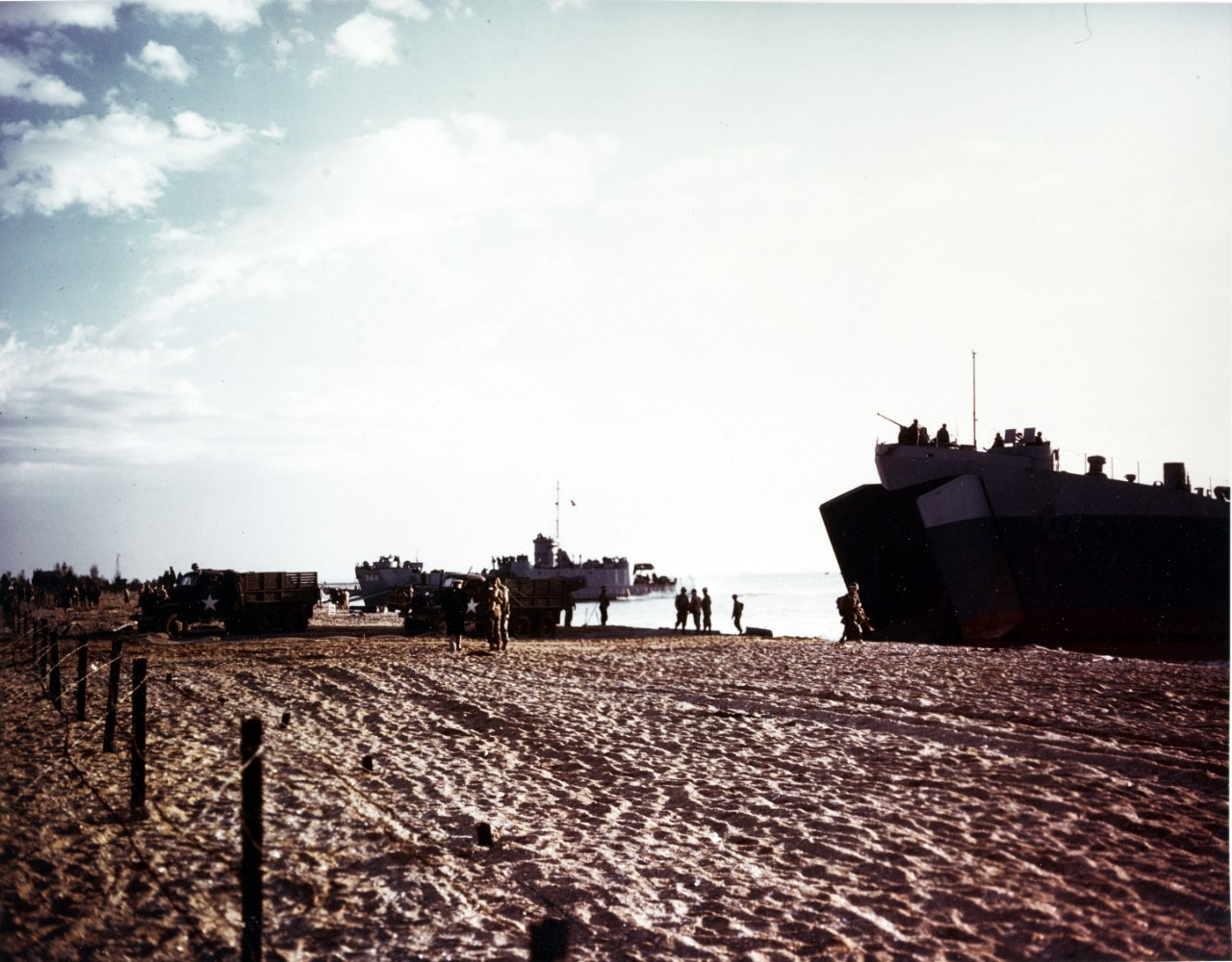
- Naval Amphibious Training Base Solomons with a Landing Ship, Tank (LST) ship unloading in 1943

Site information
- Type: Military training base
- Controlled by: United States Navy

Location
- Coordinates: 38.326913°N 76.454940°W

Site history
- Built: 1942
- In use: 1942–1945
- Fate: Closed in April 1945
- Events: Amphibious Training for World War II

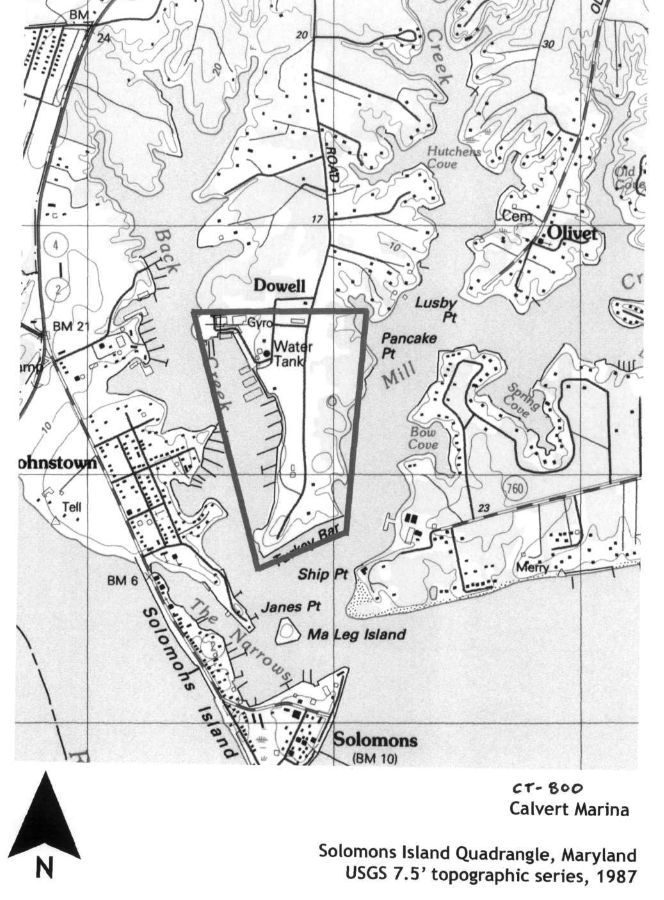
A map of Naval Amphibious Training Base Solomons

Naval Amphibious Training Base Solomons also called Naval Amphibious Training Base Solomons Island was a US Amphibious Training Base at Solomons, Maryland, on the Dowell Peninsula, from 1942 to 1945 built to train troops for World War II amphibious warfare.

Naval Amphibious Training Base Solomons was the United States's first official naval amphibious training base. It was established in August 1942 on the Patuxent River, called: USNATB, United States Navy Amphibious Training Base. The base closed April 1945, after training 67,698 troops.

== History ==
Due to the urgent demand for Amphibious Training, Naval Amphibious Training Base Solomons was founded as a temporary base. On July 22, 1944, had its maximum population of 10,150 troops on the base staff and amphibious landing training troops. The base had its own power station, water system, barracks, mess halls, motor pool, and other facilities. On-ship training took place in Chesapeake Bay. Many of the troops completed their basic training at nearby United States Naval Training Center Bainbridge. The first 3,300 Troops arrived at the base in July 1942 for an eight-week training program.

A Naval Combat Demolition Unit (NCDU) was started on May 14, 1943, at the Solomons base. The first team was made up of six officers and 18 enlisted troops trained at the base. Each NCDU were volunteers, training for the Allied invasion of Sicily, called Operation Husky. In addition to Amphibious Training, for the war effort the US Navy had other operations and training at the base including: Naval mine Warfare Test Station (NMWTS), Mine Warfare Experimental Station, and Naval Dispensary for the Training Base.

The site of the Naval Amphibious Training Base Solomons is now Calvert Marina. In 1945, at the closure of Naval Amphibious Training Base Solomons, the land was given to the state of Maryland and used for Maryland Marine Police for Tidewater Fisheries Enforcement Patrols. In 1959 the US sold the land to a private yacht club and marina. In 1981 the land was sold again. Some of the Naval Amphibious Training Base Solomons 17 buildings have been converted for other uses. Across the Patuxent River from Naval Amphibious Training Base Solomons is Naval Air Station Patuxent River.

== Naval Ordnance Laboratory Test Facility ==
While the Naval Amphibious Training Base Solomons closed in 1945, the Naval Mine Warfare Test Station (NMWTS) and Mine Warfare Experimental Station continued to operate at what was known as the 295-acre Naval Solomons Annex under the Naval Ordnance Laboratory (NOL). At the site the Naval Ordnance Laboratory Test Facility (NOLTF) was founded in 1947 and operated till 1950. The NOLTF worked on high and low-altitude aircraft drops for testing and training of mine drops, training and testing of torpedo firing in the river, and with naval mines. By 1958, torpedo firing had ended and missile assembly was added to the Test Facility.

In 1948, the Bureau of Yards and Docks opened the Naval Civil Engineering Laboratory (NCEL), which worked on amphibious equipment at the Annex. In 1967 facility activities started to close and in 1971 site became a Naval Recreation Center Solomons (NRC) under Naval District Washington (NDW), and administered by Naval Air Station Patuxent River. Naval Recreation Center Solomons is open to Active Duty Military and Reservist Military in active standing including spouses and dependents. Naval Recreation Center Solomons had cabins, store, camping, fishing, adventure zone, boat rental, pool and beaches.

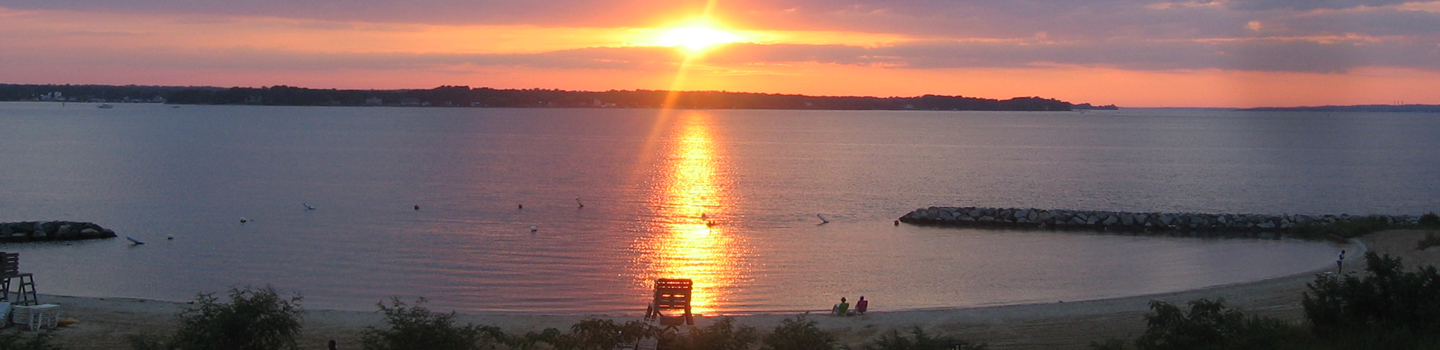
Naval Recreation Center Solomons (NRC), opened in 1971 on the former site of the Naval Ordnance Laboratory Test Facility, at the former Naval Amphibious Training Base Solomons

== Background ==
The United States amphibious operations dates back to the early dates of the nation. On March 3, 1776, the Continental Marines made their first amphibious landing in the Battle of Nassau on to the beaches of the Bahamas. Amphibious operations took place in the American Civil War, Spanish–American War, and World War I. Large-scale amphibious training bases were established during World War II.

Before World War II, the need for an Amphibious Training Base was seen. In 1903, President Theodore Roosevelt from his experience in the Spanish-American War established a Joint Army-Navy Board in 1903, but no Amphibious Training Base came out of this. One of the first small-scale Amphibious Training took place in Culebra and Vieques, Puerto Rico at the request of the Secretary of the Navy Josephus Daniels in 1913. During World War I, the Gallipoli amphibious operations in Turkey did not go well for the Allies, thus some thought that amphibious warfare was at an end.

After World War I, in which Japan fought on the Allied side, Japan took control of German bases in China and the Pacific. In 1919, the League of Nations approved Japan's mandate over the German islands north of the equator. The United States did not want any mandates and was concerned with Japan's aggressiveness. As such Wilson Administration transferred 200 Atlantic warships to the Pacific Fleet in 1919.

With new concerns in the Pacific, in 1921, Marine Commandant Lieutenant General John A. Lejeune asked Major Earl "Pete" Ellis to make up plans for an amphibious war with Japan, as to be prepared. Ellis wrote OpPlan 712: Advance Base Operations in Micronesia, which outlined modern amphibious warfare. The Fleet Marine Force was founded on December 7, 1933. Fleet Marine Force was a combined Force of both the US Navy and the United States Marine Corps. On December 7, 1941, Japan carried out a surprise military strike on the Naval Base in Pearl Harbor. Japan hoped to eliminate US military force in the Pacific as it soon carried out attacks across the South Pacific.

The attack led the US to enter World War II. During World War II the United States was fighting on two fronts, the Pacific War and the European theatre. The Pacific War was an amphibious operation of Island-hopping and the European theatre required amphibious operations to get a foothold on the European continent. European theatre saw major amphibious operations at the invasion of North Africa, Southern France, Sicily, Italy and Normandy.

On January 5, 1942 Seabee Navy Construction Battalions officially began operation. In July 1943 Seabee started an Amphibious Construction Battalion, with Amphibious Construction Battalion 1 as the first unit, which operated in the Pacific War. Seabee were given the task of clearing beaches of obstacles and establishing beachhead bases. In addition, Seabees built and operated sea ports, airfields and served as elements the United States Marine Corps.

Other bases opened on both coasts of the United States. Due to the demand for Amphibious Training, overseas bases were founded in North Africa and the South Pacific.

The United States Navy needed to train with the US Army and US Marine Corps, as amphibious landing require complex operations:

- Strategic planning
- Amphibious vessels need to arrive and be loaded with all the supplies and troops needed for the operation.
- Must be reconnaissance of the landing site
- Landing site may need obstacles removed, and the water depth checked.
- Landing must be timed to the tide.
- Air cover must be timed to landing.
- Beach checked for landmines and other obstacles.
- After troops and vehicles debark, support supplies are unloaded the beachhead supply depot

== Legacy ==
- In Dowell, Maryland, in Calvert County, Maryland on Dowell Road, at 38.334783°N 76.453617°W is a Maryland Historical Society historic marker to Naval Amphibious Training Base Solomons. The Naval Amphibious Training Base Solomons marker read:
  - This nation's first naval amphibious training base was established here at Solomons where between 1942 and 1945 some 68,000 sailers, marines, coast guardsmen, and soldiers were trained. They formed the major components of the amphibious forces which landed at Guadalcanal, North Africa, Sicily and Normandy. Ironically, some of those trained here at Solomons, Maryland, participated in the landings in the Solomon Islands in the Pacific.
- The "On Watch" Monument is a bronze sculpture, commemorating the World War II Naval Amphibious Training Base Solomons from 1942 to 1945. The "On Watch" Monument at 38.325487°N 76.455840°W was made by Antonio Tobias Mendez at Solomons, Maryland.
- Calvert Marine Museum has a Naval Amphibious Training Base Solomons Collection in the maritime history section.
- The Calvert Marine, which serves boats and ships is on the former site of the Naval Amphibious Training Base Solomons on Black Creek.
- The Harbours Point Park is on the former site of the Naval Amphibious Training Base Solomons.
- The Senior Officers Quarters, Solomons ATB, is now the Calvert Marina Clubhouse.
- Naval Recreation Center (NAVRECCEN) Solomons, also known as Naval District Washington (NDW) Solomons Complex, is on the former site of the Naval Mine Warfare Test Station (NMWTS), also called the Naval Ordnance Laboratory (NOL), on 296 acres on Point Patience.

== See also ==
- Patuxent River Naval Air Museum
- United States Marine Corps Reconnaissance Training Company
- United States Navy SEALs
- US Naval Advance Bases
- List of United States Navy shore activities during World War II
