= Dowell, Maryland =

Unincorporated community in Maryland, U.S.

Coordinates: 38.350138°N 76.458063°W

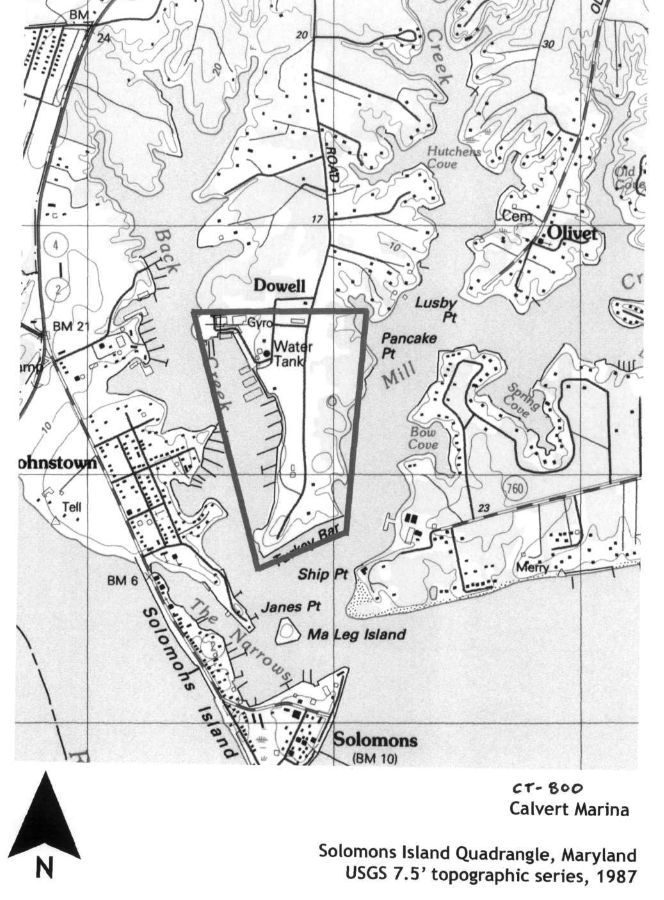
Map of Naval Amphibious Training Base Solomons on Dowell Peninsula, Maryland, from 1942 to 1945. Dowell is just north of Solomons, where the base was located.

Dowell is a small, rural unincorporated community in Calvert County, Maryland, United States, located immediately north of Solomons. The city once had its own zip code, that being 20629, but it was changed to 20688, shared with Solomons. Solomons now encompasses the entirety of the Dowell peninsula.
