= Salinas River National Wildlife Refuge =

Wildlife refuge in California

- IUCN category IV (habitat/species management area)
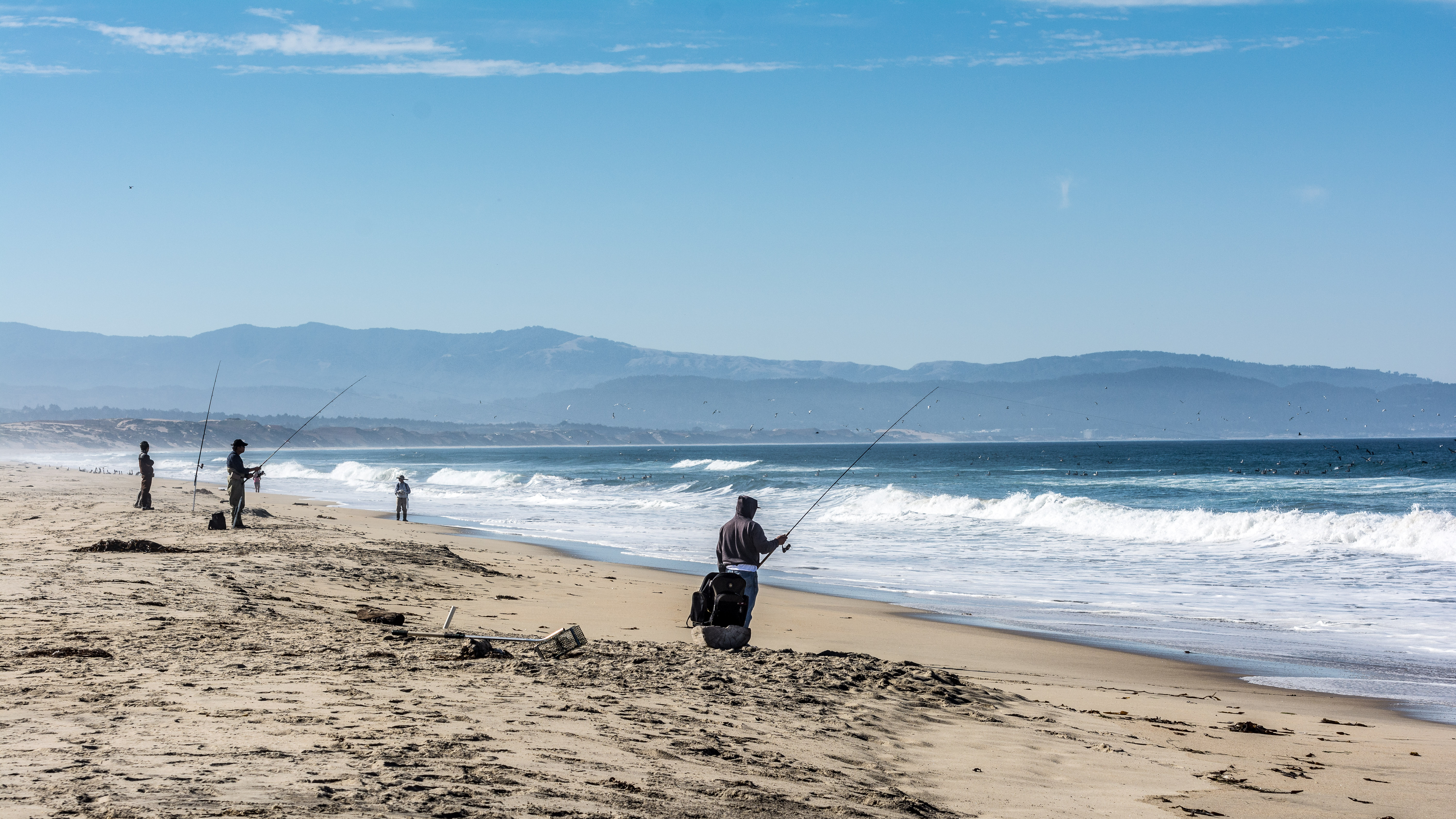

- Location within the United States
- Location: Monterey County, California, United States
- Nearest city: Castroville, California
- Coordinates: 36°44′30″N 121°48′14″W
- Area: 367 acres (1.49 km^{2})
- Established: 1974
- Governing body: U.S. Fish and Wildlife Service
- Website: Salinas River National Wildlife Refuge

Salinas River National Wildlife Refuge is located approximately 11 miles north of Monterey, California, and 3 miles south of Castroville, California, at the point where the Salinas River empties into Monterey Bay. The 367-acre (1.49 km^{2}) refuge encompasses several habitat types including sand dunes, pickleweed salt marsh, river lagoon, riverine habitat, and a saline pond. The refuge was established in 1974 because of its "particular value in carrying out the national migratory bird management program".

The area provides habitat for several threatened and endangered species, including the California brown pelican, Smith's blue butterfly, the western snowy plover, the Monterey sand gilia, and the Monterey spineflower. The refuge is used by a variety of migratory birds during breeding, wintering, and migrating periods. Refuge mammals include muskrat, golden beaver, gray fox, red fox, striped skunk, longtail weasel, Virginia opossum, vagrant shrew, broad-footed mole, brush rabbit, raccoon, duskyfooted woodrat, deer mouse, and coyote.

Salinas River National Wildlife Refuge is open to the public though there are no facilities beyond a parking lot and footpaths.

Dogs, horseback riding, and camping are not permitted due to the sensitivity of the habitat.

== Climate ==
Northwestern Monterey County has a Mediterranean climate with warm and dry summers. The weather is generally wet and mild in the winter. The area receives about 16 inches of rain in an average year, mostly between November and April. Wind comes from the southeast during the summer and fall, and there is a steady northwest wind during winter and spring.

== Water quality ==
The Salinas River water is contaminated due to pumping and industry. Alteration of water flow disrupts the natural concentration of salt. The worst threat to water quality is agricultural pollution originating in the broad stretches of farmland upstream. The water experiences eutrophication and algae overgrowth. Pesticides in local waters include dichlorodiphenyltrichloroethane and other organochlorine insecticides.

Salinas River water pollution is a main threat to the California slender salamander and other endangered species. Federal authorities routinely test water quality.

== Geology ==
The refuge is located in the California Coast Ranges. Basement rocks along the coast are from the Mesozoic, 65 to are 245 million years old. About seven million years ago the local ranges experienced most of their uplift, and there are several geological faults, such as the San Gregorio-Hosgri fault system. The majority of the refuge itself is located on inactive Pleistocene dune deposits and clay.

Analysis of the geology of the riverbanks revealed sand beneath the clay, but dense clay farther down. Liquefaction is unlikely in this area.

== See also ==
- Amphibious Training Base, Castroville former land use.
