= Naval Amphibious Training Base Fort Pierce =

Military installation in Florida in the 1940s

Coordinates: 27.4602°N 80.3107°W

The Naval Amphibious Training Base Fort Pierce, Florida is a former training base centered around Fort Pierce, Florida. The 19,280 acres (7,800 ha) site extended 25 miles (40 km) from near Vero Beach, Florida to near Jensen Beach, Florida. It included North Hutchinson Island and Hutchinson Island South.

The site was used as a training facility for amphibious troops for invading Normandy during World War II. There were as many as 40,000 troops stationed there. There were 450 buildings, and the base was demobilized and closed in 1946.

Training offshore were Underwater Demolition Teams.

In the 21st century, the government has attempted to identify and remove explosives which were buried there at the end of the war.
