= Solomons, Maryland =

- Census-designated place
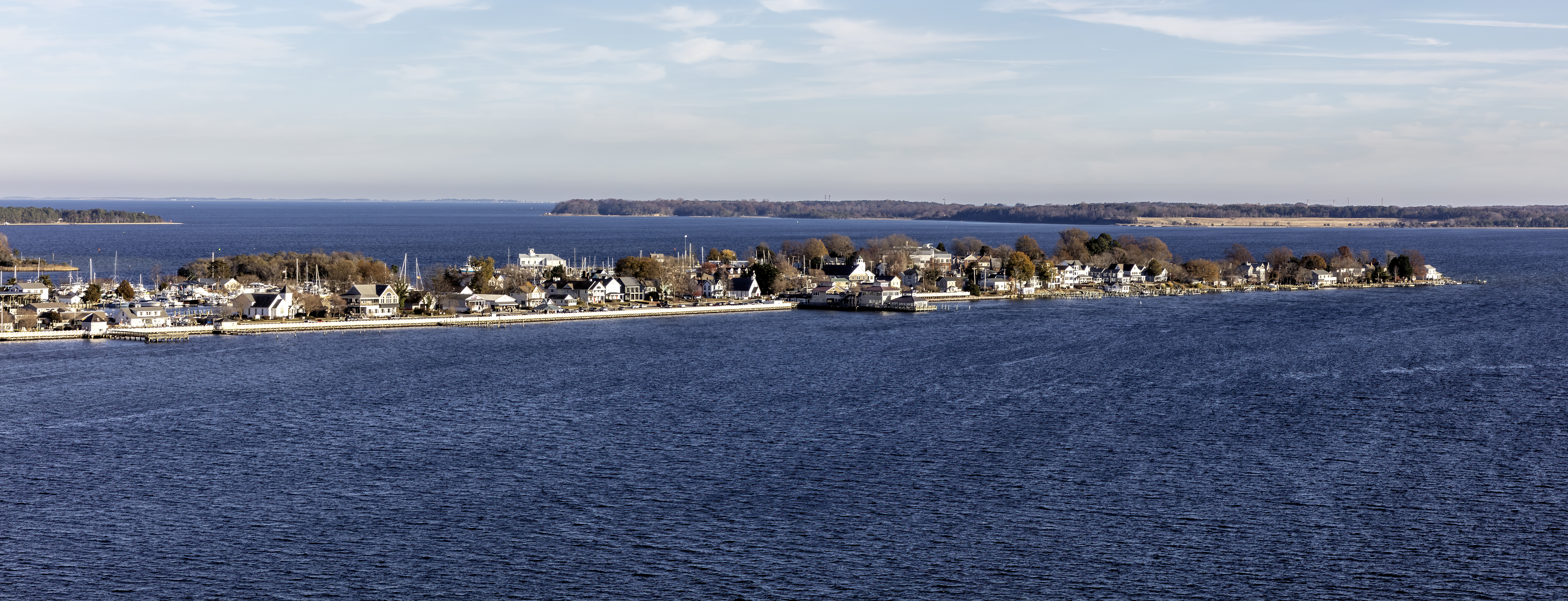
- Solomons from the Thomas Johnson Bridge in 2023

- Location of Solomons, Maryland
- Coordinates: 38°20′11″N 76°27′51″W
- Country: United States
- State: Maryland
- County: Calvert

Area
  - Total: 2.34 sq mi (6.05 km^{2})
  - Land: 1.99 sq mi (5.16 km^{2})
  - Water: 0.34 sq mi (0.89 km^{2})
- Elevation: 0 ft (0 m)

Population (2024)
  - Total: 2,221
  - Density: 1,331.3/sq mi (514.02/km^{2})
- Time zone: UTC−5 (Eastern (EST))
  - Summer (DST): UTC−4 (EDT)
- ZIP code: 20688
- Area codes: 410, 443, and 667
- FIPS code: 24-73325
- GNIS feature ID: 1676619

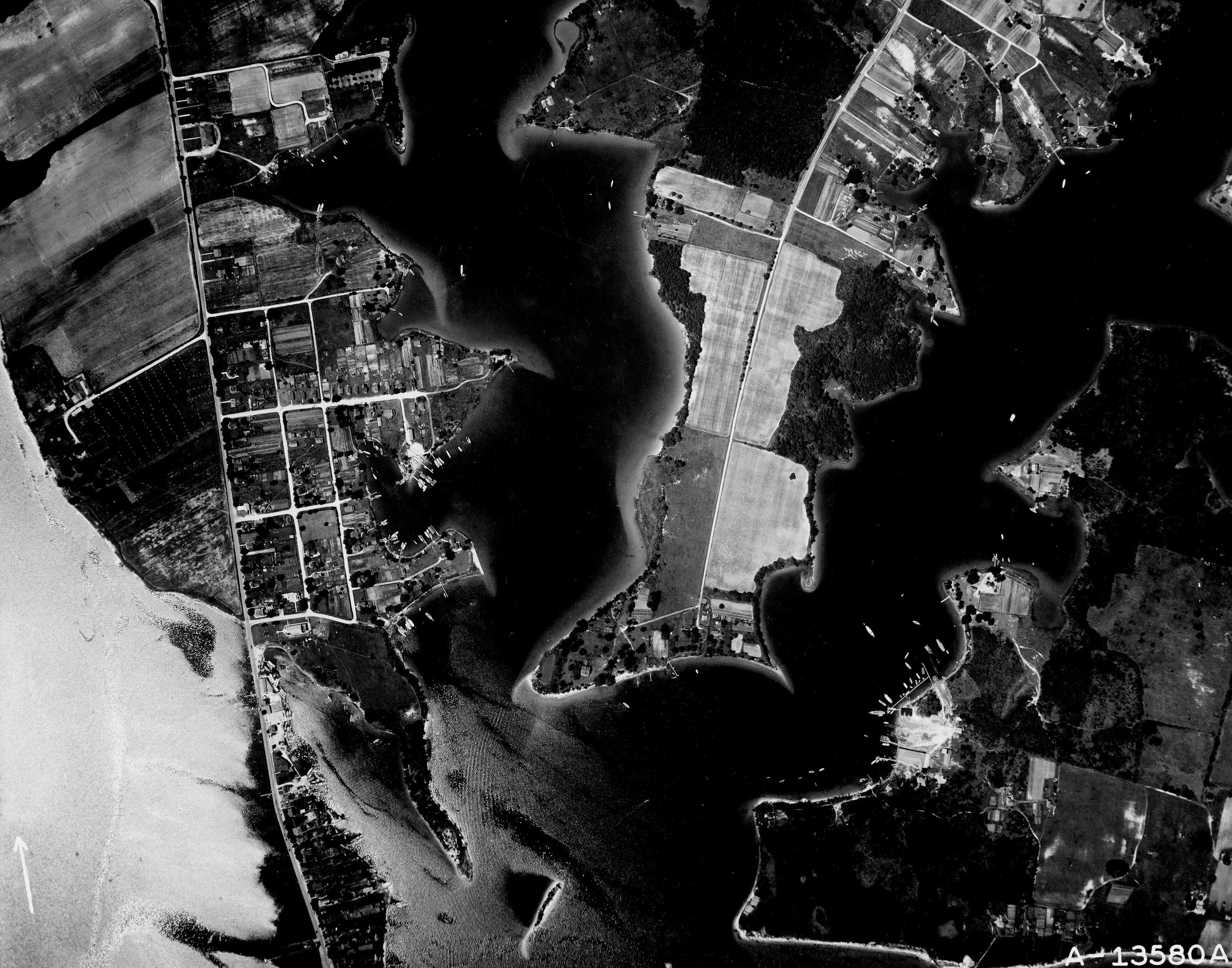
Solomons, 1937

Solomons, also known as Solomons Island, is an unincorporated community and census-designated place (CDP) in Calvert County, Maryland, United States. The population was 2,368 at the 2010 census, up from 1,536 in 2000. Solomons is a popular weekend destination spot in the Baltimore–Washington metropolitan area.

== Geography ==
Solomons is located at the southern tip of Calvert County at 38°20′11″N 76°27′51″W (38.336431, −76.464102). It includes Solomons Island and mainland on the north side of the mouth of Patuxent River, where it meets the Chesapeake Bay. It is just across from the U.S. Naval Air Station Patuxent River (on the south side of the mouth of the Patuxent River). The city also included the west and south part of the Dowell Peninsula.

According to the United States Census Bureau, the Solomons CDP has a total area of 2.3 square miles (6.0 km^{2}), of which 2.0 square miles (5.2 km^{2}) is land and 0.35 square miles (0.9 km^{2}), or 14.76%, is water, consisting mainly of Back Creek, a tidal inlet that extends north from the Patuxent River.

=== Climate ===
The climate in this area is characterized by hot, humid summers and generally mild to cool winters. According to the Köppen Climate Classification system, Solomons has a humid subtropical climate, abbreviated "Cfa" on climate maps. Monthly average temperatures on Solomons Island range from 36.7 °F in January to 78.7 °F in July.

Climate data for Solomons, Maryland (1991–2020 normals, extremes 1893–present)
Month	Jan	Feb	Mar	Apr	May	Jun	Jul	Aug	Sep	Oct	Nov	Dec	Year
Record high °F (°C)	76 (24)	79 (26)	89 (32)	91 (33)	100 (38)	99 (37)	103 (39)	104 (40)	99 (37)	95 (35)	82 (28)	75 (24)	104 (40)
Mean daily maximum °F (°C)	45.3 (7.4)	47.6 (8.7)	54.9 (12.7)	65.4 (18.6)	74.2 (23.4)	83.8 (28.8)	87.9 (31.1)	86.3 (30.2)	79.9 (26.6)	68.7 (20.4)	58.6 (14.8)	50.1 (10.1)	66.9 (19.4)
Daily mean °F (°C)	37.7 (3.2)	39.2 (4.0)	46.3 (7.9)	56.4 (13.6)	66.0 (18.9)	75.7 (24.3)	80.3 (26.8)	78.7 (25.9)	72.4 (22.4)	61.0 (16.1)	50.8 (10.4)	42.3 (5.7)	58.9 (14.9)
Mean daily minimum °F (°C)	30.1 (−1.1)	30.8 (−0.7)	37.6 (3.1)	47.4 (8.6)	57.9 (14.4)	67.6 (19.8)	72.7 (22.6)	71.0 (21.7)	65.0 (18.3)	53.4 (11.9)	43.0 (6.1)	34.5 (1.4)	50.9 (10.5)
Record low °F (°C)	−3 (−19)	−5 (−21)	10 (−12)	17 (−8)	32 (0)	47 (8)	53 (12)	49 (9)	43 (6)	30 (−1)	13 (−11)	−1 (−18)	−5 (−21)
Source: NOAA

== History ==
=== Early settlers ===
Originally called Bourne's Island (1680), then Somervell's Island (1740), Solomons takes its name from 19th century Baltimore businessman Isaac Solomon, who established a cannery there shortly after the Civil War. Solomon's home still stands on the front of the island.

The area has been inhabited since colonial times.

=== Shipbuilding and maritime activity ===
In the 19th century, shipyards developed to support the island's fishing fleet. The Marsh Shipyard built schooners and sloops but became famous for its bugeyes, the forerunner of the skipjack. In the War of 1812, Commodore Joshua Barney's flotilla sailed from here to attack British vessels on Chesapeake Bay. The deep, protected harbor has been a busy marine center ever since. Kronprinzessin Cecilie, a 1906-built German ocean liner which during World War I was commandeered (and renamed Mount Vernon (ID-4508) by the US, was laid up at Solomons in 1920.

=== Supporting the U.S. Navy during World War II ===
During World War II, the island was chosen by the Allied command as the site for Naval Amphibious Training Base Solomons. The lessons learned at Solomons proved invaluable on D-Day, at Tarawa, at Guadalcanal, and in numerous other military operations. Three naval bases were established at the mouth of the Patuxent River. These three facilities made a major contribution to the war effort and brought new jobs to local residents. Between 1942 and 1945, the population of Solomons increased from 263 to more than 2,600. Over 60,000 troops trained at Solomons during the war.

Coincidentally, many of the servicemen who trained at the Solomons base in Maryland were sent to fight in the Solomon Islands in the Pacific Ocean.

Solomons was the site of the following U.S. Navy activities during the war:

- Naval Mine Warfare Test Station, now the Solomons Annex Naval Recreation Center
- Naval Amphibious Training Base, now Calvert Marine and Harbours Point Park
- Mine Warfare Experimental Station
- Naval Dispensary, at Naval Amphibious Training Base

=== Governor Thomas Johnson Bridge ===
Solomons was a rather isolated boat-building town housing the University of Maryland Chesapeake Biological Laboratory, until 1977 when the Governor Thomas Johnson Bridge was built. The bridge leads from just off Solomons Island proper to St. Mary's County and the Patuxent Naval Air Station.

== Tourism ==
The town now welcomes tourists with numerous marinas, seafood restaurants, gift shops, a boardwalk, a sculpture garden, the Calvert Marine Museum where visitors can climb atop a former lighthouse, board harbor cruises, and hear occasional outdoor concerts by famous performers. Solomons also has three major hotels, a U.S. Navy family recreation center, and a church retirement home. St. Peter's Chapel is an historic 1889 Carpenter Gothic-style church that is still in use.

The Annmarie Sculpture Garden & Arts Center in Solomons is a Smithsonian-affiliated forested sculpture park where creations of Kenneth Snelson, George Rickey, Arnaldo Pomodoro and other major sculptors are on exhibit. Most sculptures are on loan from the National Gallery of Art or the Hirshhorn Museum. The site is both a family-friendly place with educational activities for children and a host of world-class professional artwork, including pieces by Picasso, Matisse, and Miró; the three were highlights of the 2008 opening exhibit of the new gallery space, the Arts Building. In a traffic circle outside the Arts Building stands a landmark bronze fountain-sculpture made for Annmarie Garden which depicts a Chesapeake Bay waterman standing in a boat while holding oyster-harvesting tongs. During the warm season, water pumped through concealed ductwork emerges and cascades out of the tongs' jaws and also over a shellfish-sorting riprap on the Tonger's boat. The fallen water pools around the boat in a map-shaped decorative basin where sometimes visiting children splash their feet. Since 1993, Annmarie Garden has hosted an outdoor national juried arts festival at which typically around 100 traveling artists encamp in display tents for a weekend to sell their wares.

== Demographics ==
Historical population
Census	Pop.	Note	%±
2020	2,650		—
U.S. Decennial Census

=== 2020 census ===
As of the 2020 census, Solomons had a population of 2,650. The median age was 63.6 years. 9.4% of residents were under the age of 18 and 47.5% of residents were 65 years of age or older. For every 100 females there were 78.0 males, and for every 100 females age 18 and over there were 76.5 males age 18 and over.

100.0% of residents lived in urban areas, while 0.0% lived in rural areas.

There were 1,280 households in Solomons, of which 14.1% had children under the age of 18 living in them. Of all households, 46.3% were married-couple households, 15.5% were households with a male householder and no spouse or partner present, and 34.1% were households with a female householder and no spouse or partner present. About 37.1% of all households were made up of individuals and 25.0% had someone living alone who was 65 years of age or older.

There were 1,580 housing units, of which 19.0% were vacant. The homeowner vacancy rate was 2.2% and the rental vacancy rate was 4.5%.

Racial composition as of the 2020 census
Race	Number	Percent
White	2,288	86.3%
Black or African American	154	5.8%
American Indian and Alaska Native	1	0.0%
Asian	70	2.6%
Native Hawaiian and Other Pacific Islander	1	0.0%
Some other race	12	0.5%
Two or more races	124	4.7%
Hispanic or Latino (of any race)	75	2.8%

=== 2000 census ===
As of the census of 2000, there were 1,536 people, 689 households, and 378 families residing in the CDP. The population density was 856.1 inhabitants per square mile (330.5/km^{2}). There were 881 housing units at an average density of 491.0 per square mile (189.6/km^{2}). The racial makeup of the CDP was 90.69% White, 6.64% African American, 0.13% Native American, 0.52% Asian, 0.33% from other races, and 1.69% from two or more races. Hispanic or Latino of any race were 0.78% of the population.

In 2000, 6.7% of Solomons residents identified as being of Welsh heritage. This was the highest percentage of Welsh Americans of any place in Maryland.

There were 689 households, out of which 15.4% had children under the age of 18 living with them, 47.8% were married couples living together, 4.8% had a female householder with no husband present, and 45.1% were non-families. 39.0% of all households were made up of individuals, and 24.8% had someone living alone who was 65 years of age or older. The average household size was 1.97 and the average family size was 2.56.

In the CDP, the population was spread out, with 13.1% under the age of 18, 3.1% from 18 to 24, 21.0% from 25 to 44, 21.2% from 45 to 64, and 41.7% who were 65 years of age or older. The median age was 56 years. For every 100 females, there were 80.1 males. For every 100 females age 18 and over, there were 76.8 males.

The median income for a household in the CDP was $48,532, and the median income for a family was $74,318. Males had a median income of $64,833 versus $34,313 for females. The per capita income for the CDP was $33,049. About 2.1% of families and 3.4% of the population were below the poverty line, including 7.0% of those under age 18 and none of those age 65 or over.

== Gallery ==
Interned German passenger ships at Solomons Island, Maryland (USA), during the First World War.

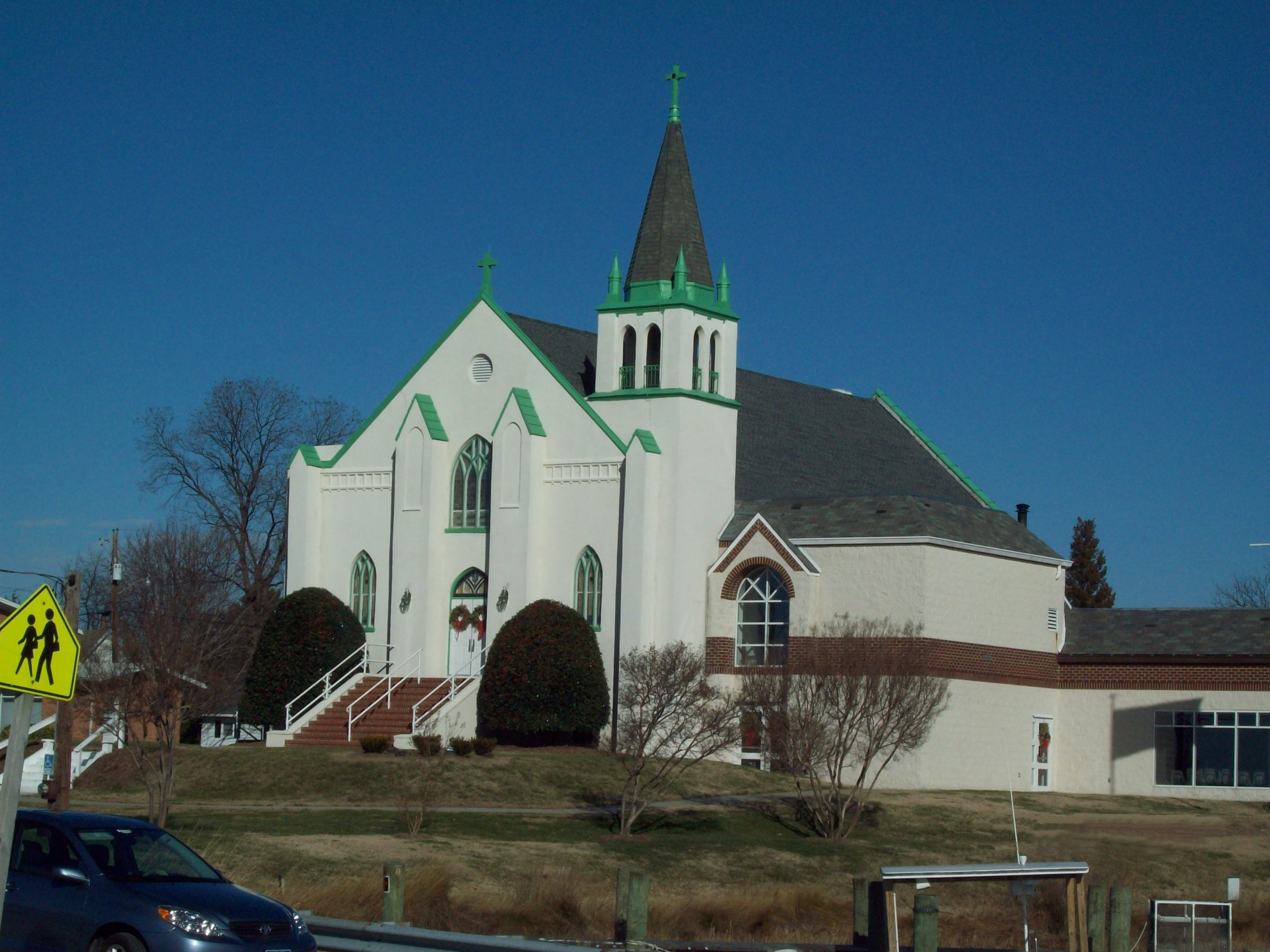
Our Lady Star of the Sea Catholic Church, December 2008

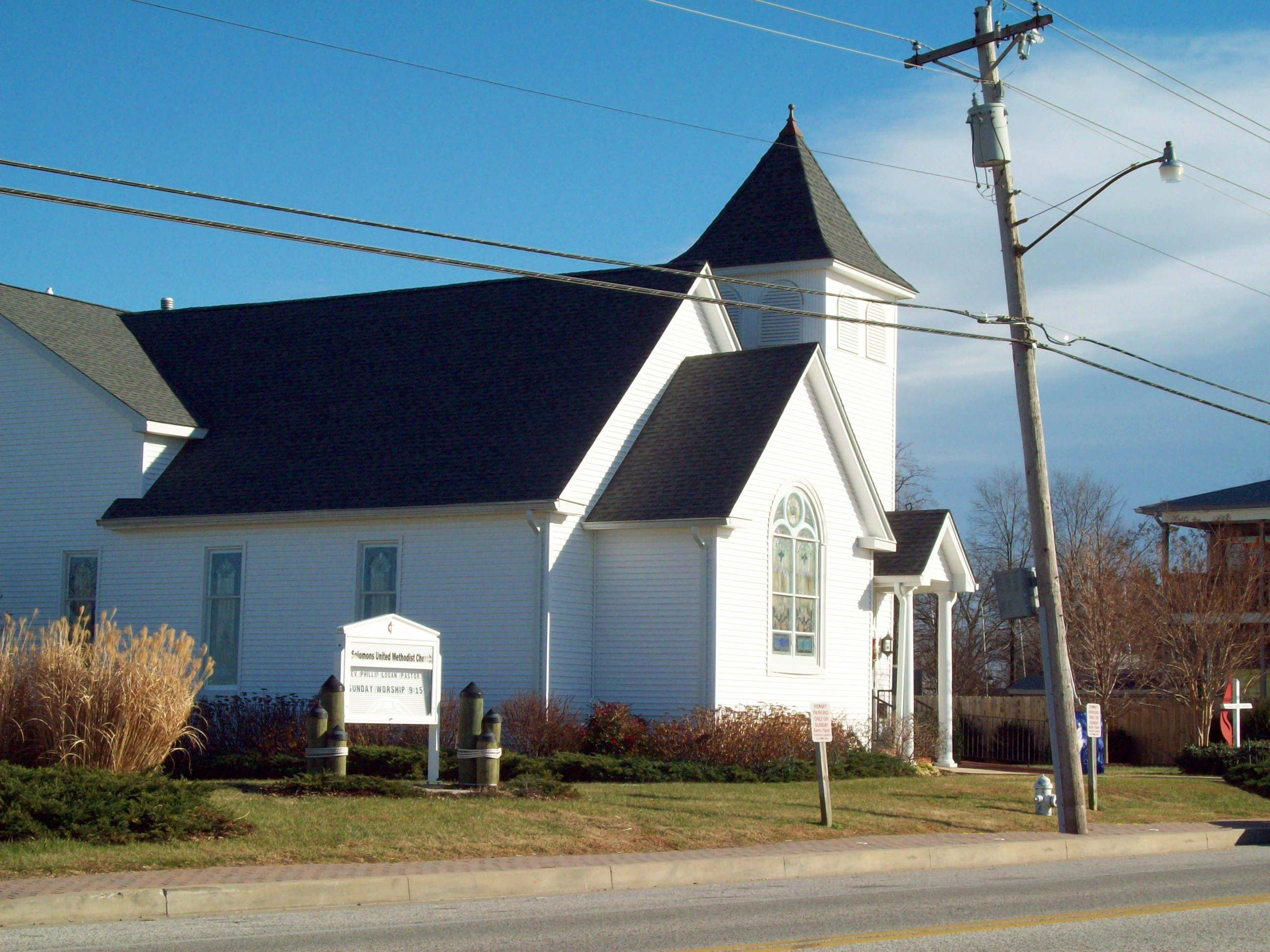
Solomons United Methodist Church, December 2008

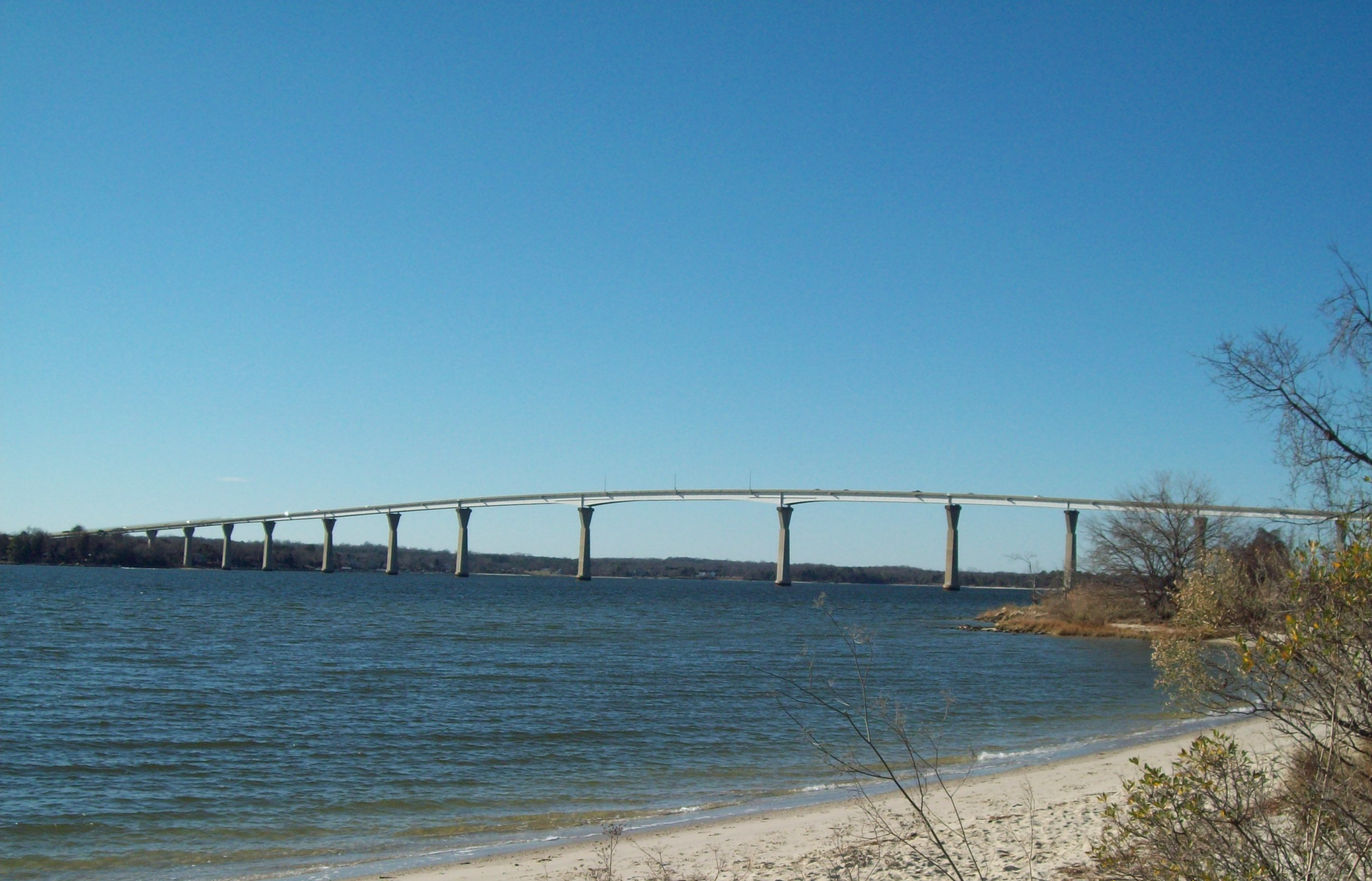
Governor Thomas Johnson Bridge, December 2008

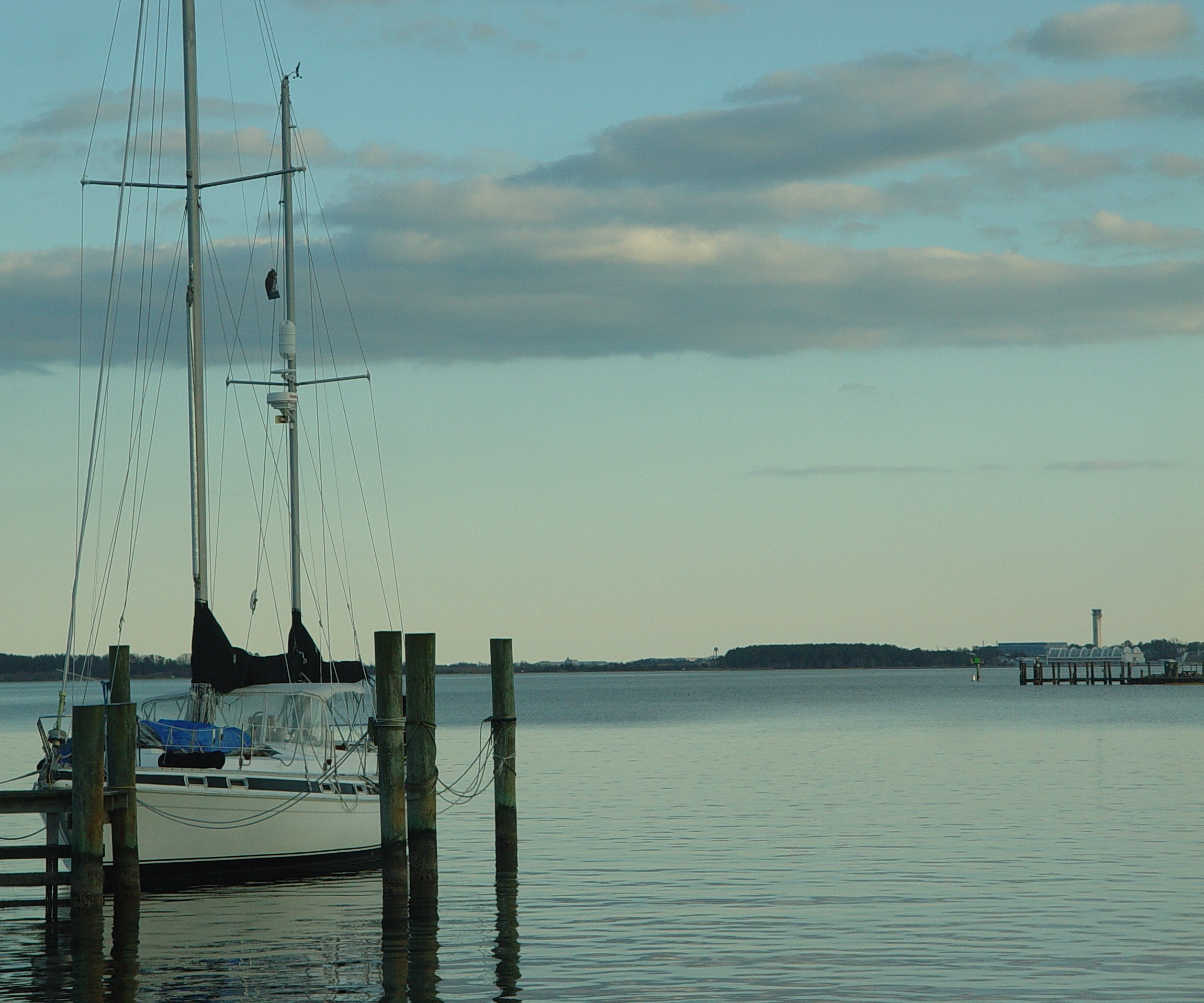
A peaceful pierside scene of calm water, February 2010

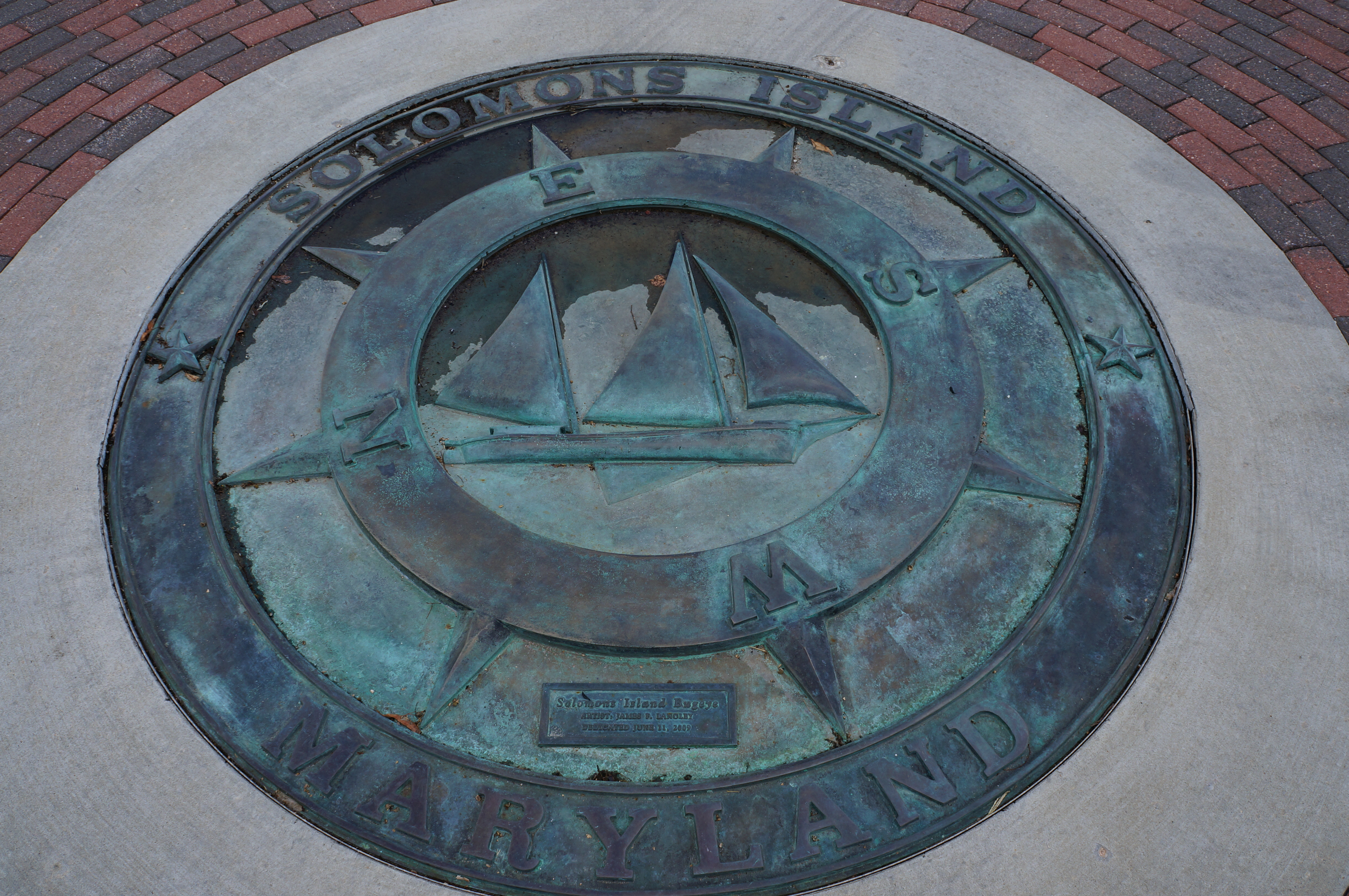
A visitors' wayfinding compass-marker on Solomons Island picturing a bugeye boat

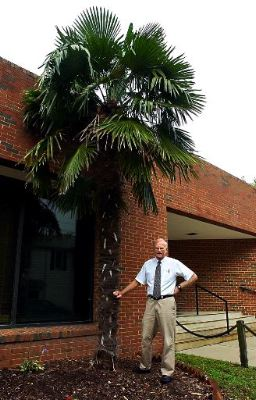
Mature palm tree in front of the Chesapeake Biological Laboratory

== Bibliography ==
- Cole, Merle T. (2007). "The First Aerial Photograph of Solomons?". Warship International. XLIV (4): 315–318. ISSN 0043-0374.
