= List of state highways in Maryland shorter than one mile (700–799) =

Highway names
- Interstates: Interstate X (I-X)
- US Highways: U.S. Route X (US X)
- State: Maryland Route X (MD X)

System links
- Maryland highway system; Interstate; US; State; Scenic Byways
- Short; 2–699; 700–799; 800–899; 900–999

The following is a list of state highways in Maryland shorter than one mile (1.6 km) in length with route numbers between 700 and 799. Most of these highways act as service roads, old alignments of more prominent highways, or connectors between one or more highways. Many of these highways are unsigned and have multiple segments with the same number. Several of these highways have their own articles; those highways are summarized here and a link is provided to the main article. This list does not include highways where at least one highway of that number is at least one mile in length. All highways at least one mile in length have their own article. The highways shorter than one mile with the same number are covered in the main article for the highway.

== MD 701 ==
Maryland Route 701
- Location: Millington
- Existed: 1988–present

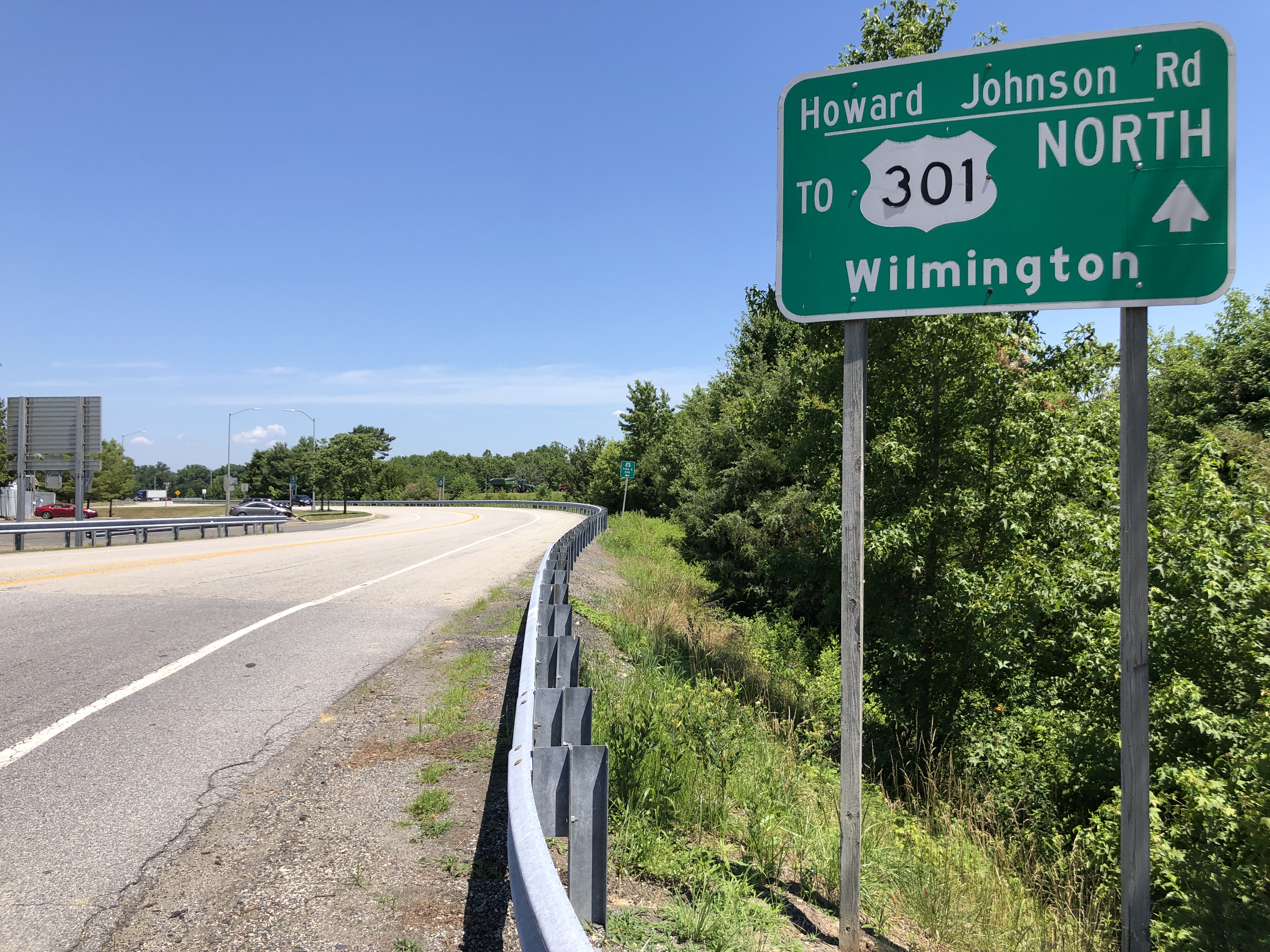
MD 701 at MD 291 near Millington

Maryland Route 701 is the unsigned designation for a pair of highways parallel to US 301 on either side of the U.S. highway's interchange with MD 291 near Millington in eastern Kent County.

- MD 701 is the designation for the 0.12-mile-long (0.19 km) state-maintained portion of Howard Johnson Road from its roundabout junction with MD 291 north to the ramps to and from northbound US 301. Howard Johnson Road continues north as a county highway to Millington Road. A park and ride lot is located on the west side of the road. The county-maintained portion contains the remains of a Howard Johnson's restaurant that was built in 1958 and closed by 2005.
- MD 701A is the designation for the 0.14-mile-long (0.23 km) state-maintained portion of Edge Road from its roundabout at MD 291 north to the ramps to and from southbound US 301. Edge Road continues north as a county highway to Chesterville Bridge Road.

Howard Johnson Road was constructed as a county highway between MD 291 and Millington Road after US 301 was built through the Millington area between 1954 and 1957. The 0.71-mile-long (1.14 km) highway was brought into state maintenance through a December 1, 1987, road transfer agreement and designated MD 701 in July 1988. Less than a decade later, the state and county signed a November 25, 1997, road transfer agreement through which the state would turn over the portions of MD 701 and the proposed service road on the west side of US 301, MD 701A, to the county after the service roads were reconstructed and resurfaced and the US 301–MD 291 interchange was completed. The interchange was constructed in 1998 and 1999. The portion of MD 701 south from the interchange ramps was relocated during the interchange construction. In 1999, MD 701 north of the interchange ramps was transferred to state maintenance, and MD 701A was assigned to its present length along Edge Road. In addition, Chesterville Bridge Road and Millington Road, which had previously had a normal intersection with US 301, were separated into separate county highways when the median of US 301 was closed. Access between the county highways requires using both MD 701s and their county extensions to cross over US 301 on MD 291.

=== References ===
Browse numbered routes
← MD 700	→ MD 702

== MD 703 ==
Maryland Route 703
- Location: Goodwill
- Length: 0.08 mi (130 m)

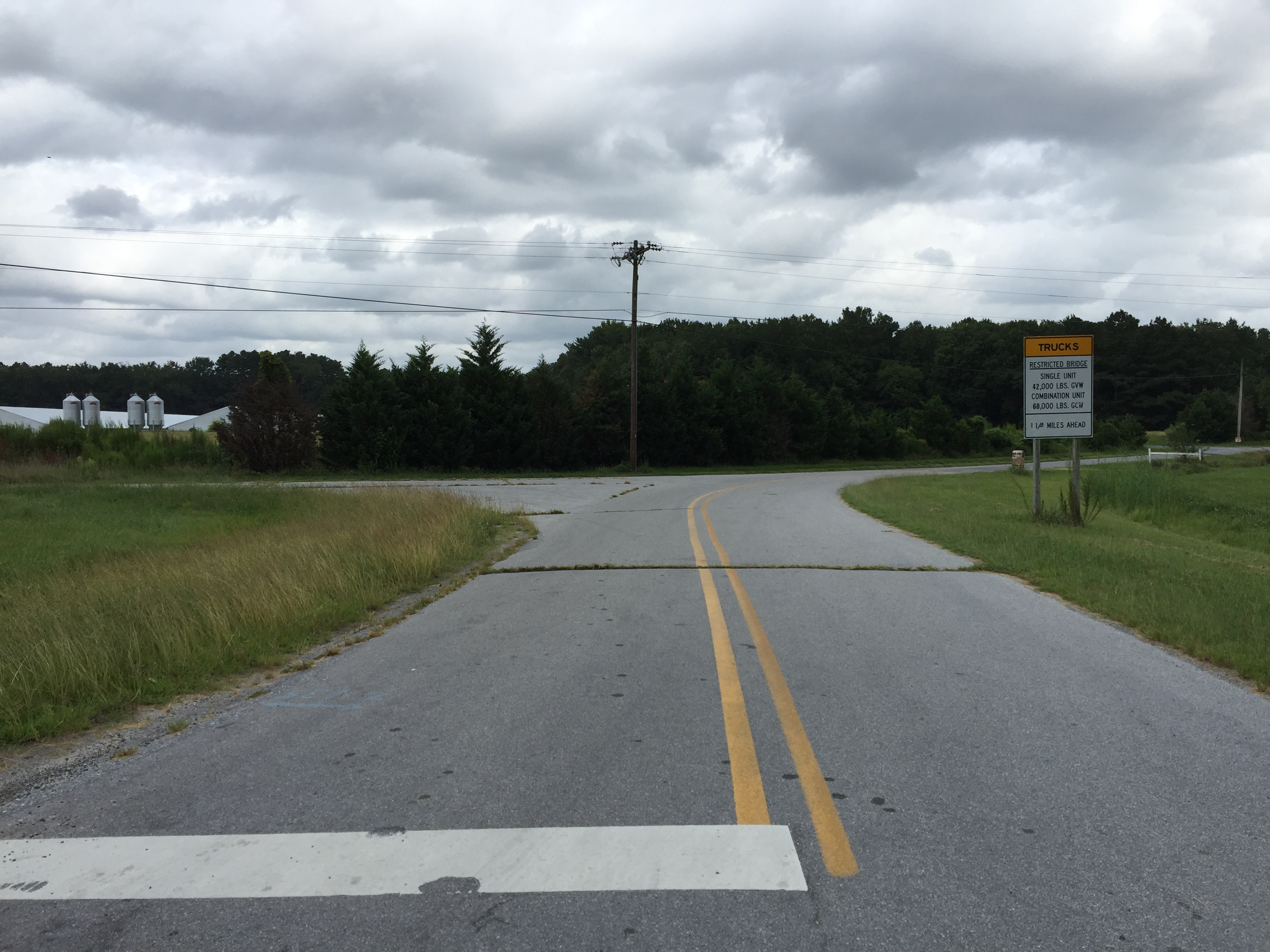
MD 703 at MD 366 in Goodwill

Maryland Route 703 is the unsigned designation for a 0.08 mi (0.13 km) L-shaped spur near Goodwill, part of an old alignment of MD 366, that runs east from a dead end to county-maintained Klej Grange Road, then turns right to connect that road with current MD 366.

Browse numbered routes
← MD 702	→ MD 704

== MD 711 ==
Maryland Route 711
- Location: Glen Burnie
- Length: 0.51 mi (820 m)

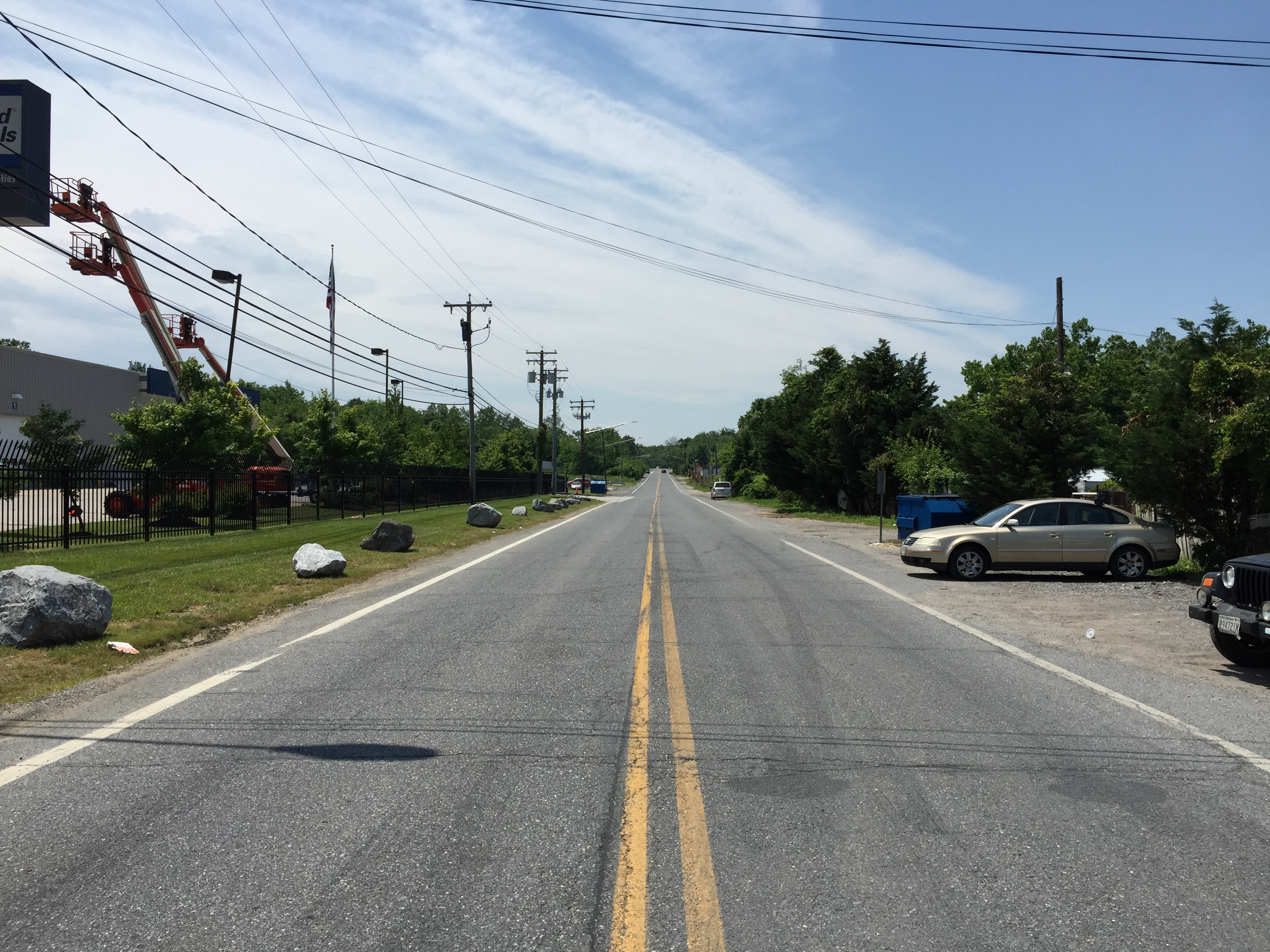
View west along MD 711 in Glen Burnie

Maryland Route 711 is the unsigned designation for Arundel Corporation Road in Glen Burnie, Anne Arundel County, which runs east from MD 2 east to the end of state maintenance, interchanging with the eastbound direction of I-695. The route is 0.51 mi (0.82 km) long.

Browse numbered routes
← MD 710	→ MD 712

== MD 717 ==
Maryland Route 717
- Location: Upper Marlboro
- Length: 0.33 mi (530 m)

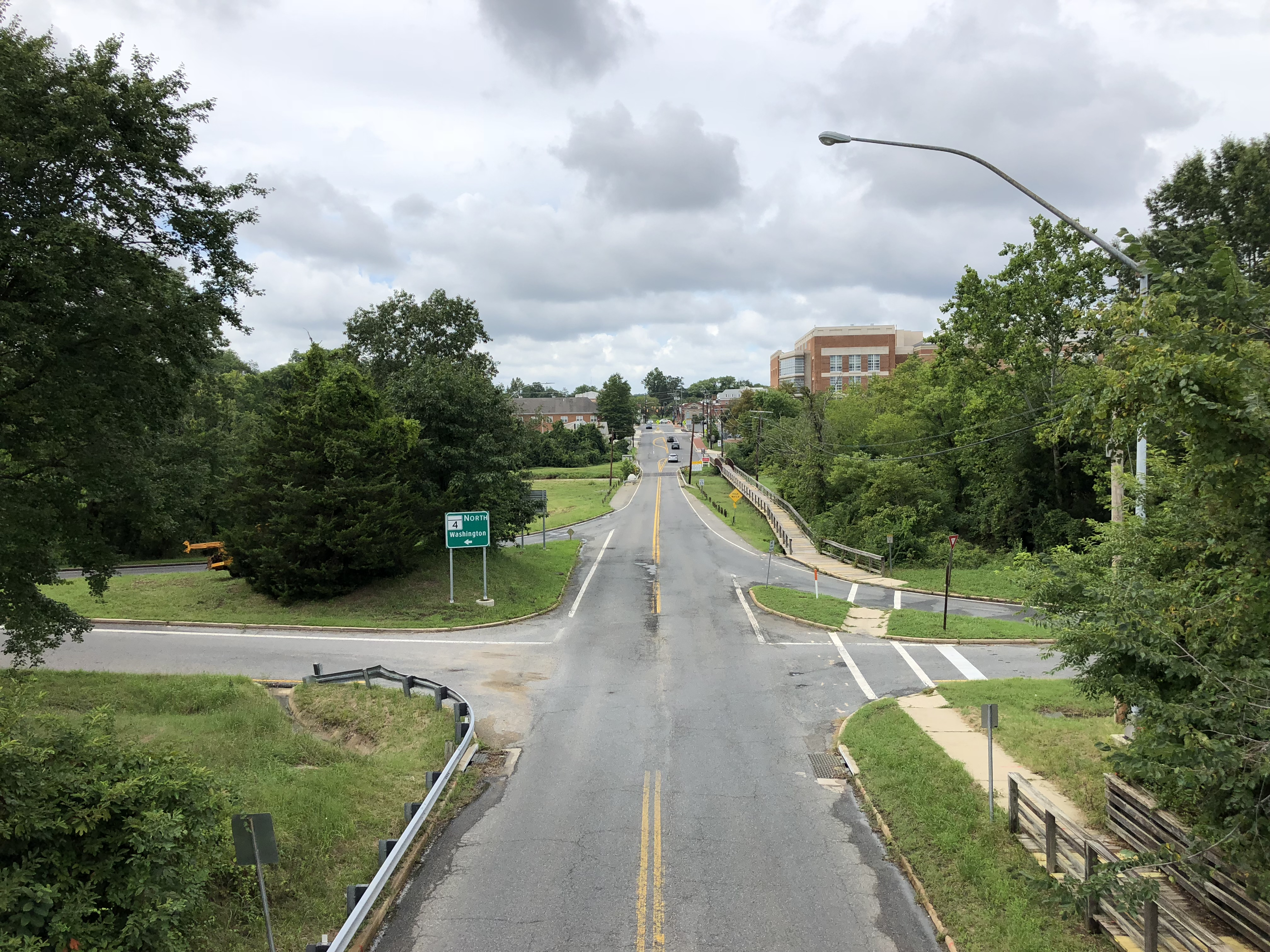
View north along MD 717 from MD 4, heading into Upper Marlboro

Maryland Route 717 is the designation for Water Street, a street that runs 0.33 miles (0.53 km) from just south of MD 4 to MD 725 within Upper Marlboro. MD 717 provides access to The Show Place Arena, the Prince George's Equestrian Center, and the Prince George's County courthouse.

Browse numbered routes
← MD 715	→ MD 723

== MD 723 ==
Maryland Route 723
- Location: Jessup
- Length: 0.18 mi (290 m)

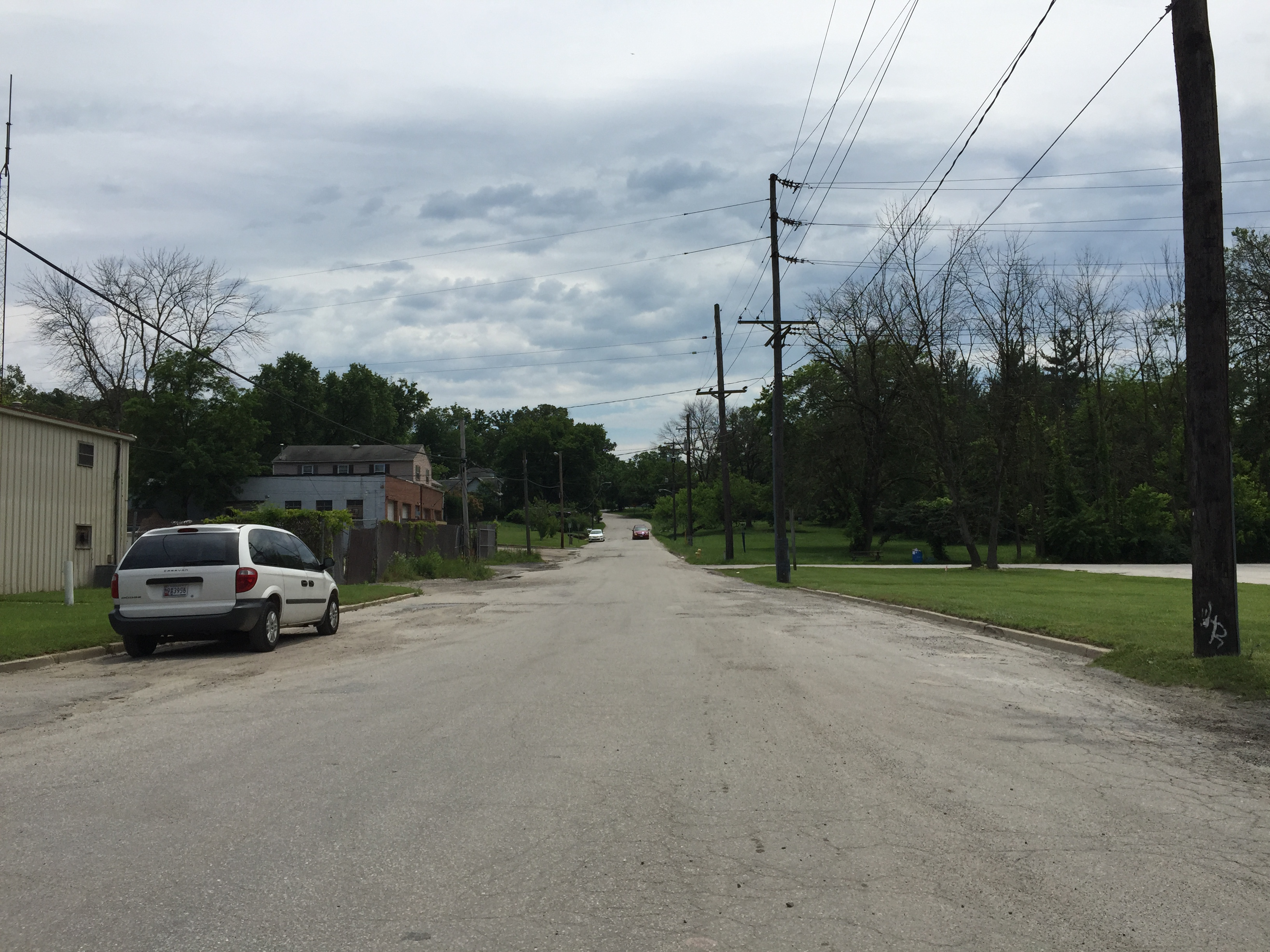
MD 723 in Jessup

Maryland Route 723 is the designation for Old Jessup Road, which runs from MD 175 east to a dead end in Jessup, Anne Arundel County. The route is 0.18 mi (0.29 km) long.

Browse numbered routes
← MD 717	→ MD 725

== MD 726 ==
Maryland Route 726
- Location: Croom
- Length: 0.28 mi (450 m)

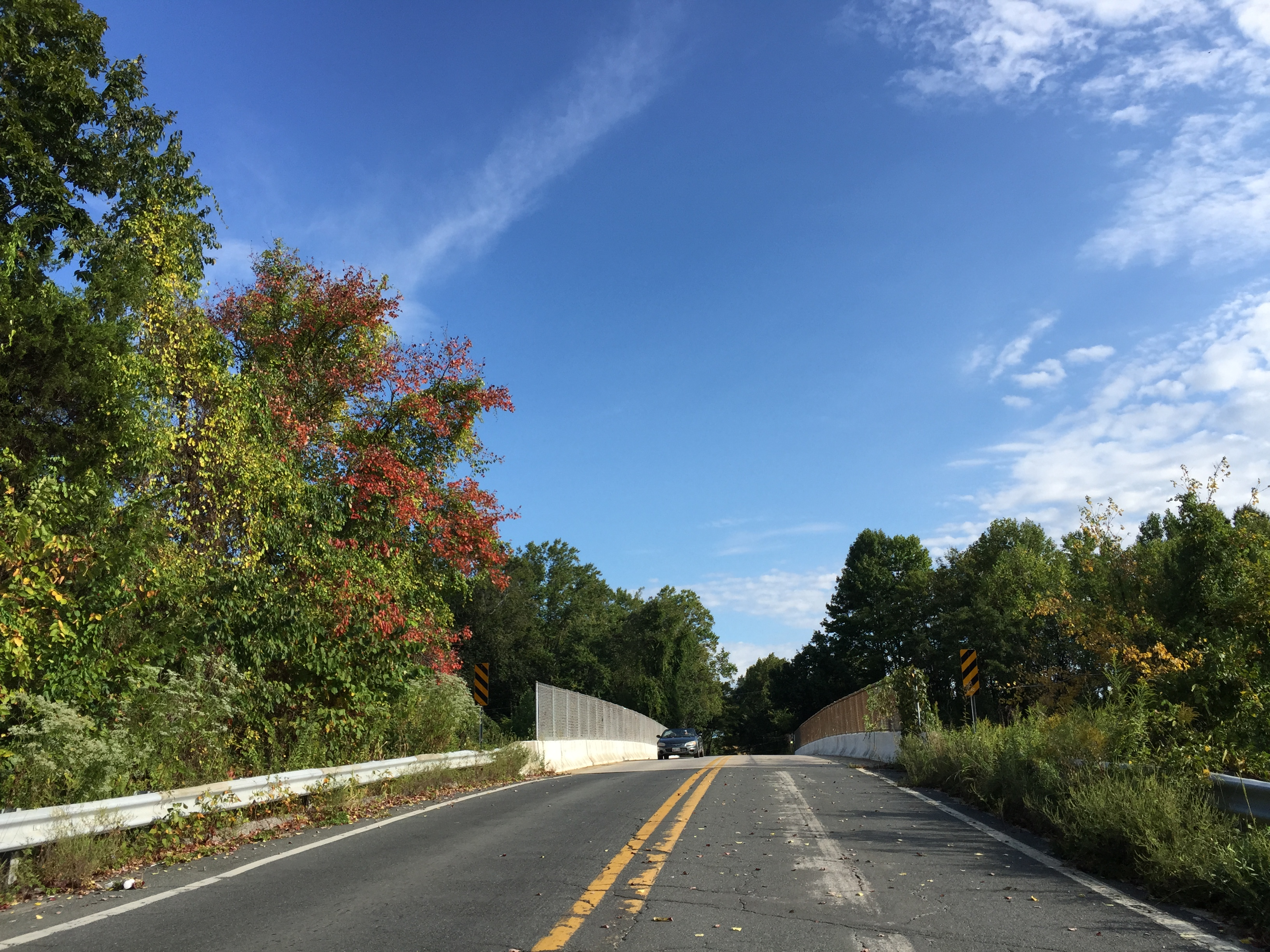
View north along MD 726 at MD 4 in Croom

Maryland Route 726 is the unsigned designation for Green Landing Road, a highway in Croom that runs 0.28-mile (0.45 km) from Hunt Club Road just south of an entrance ramp to eastbound MD 4 to Marlboro Pike. Marlboro Pike is the old alignment of MD 4 that is a county highway to the west and MD 4PA to the east, where it receives an exit ramp from westbound MD 4.

Browse numbered routes
← MD 725	→ MD 727

== MD 727 ==
Maryland Route 727
- Location: Elkton
- Existed: 1949–present

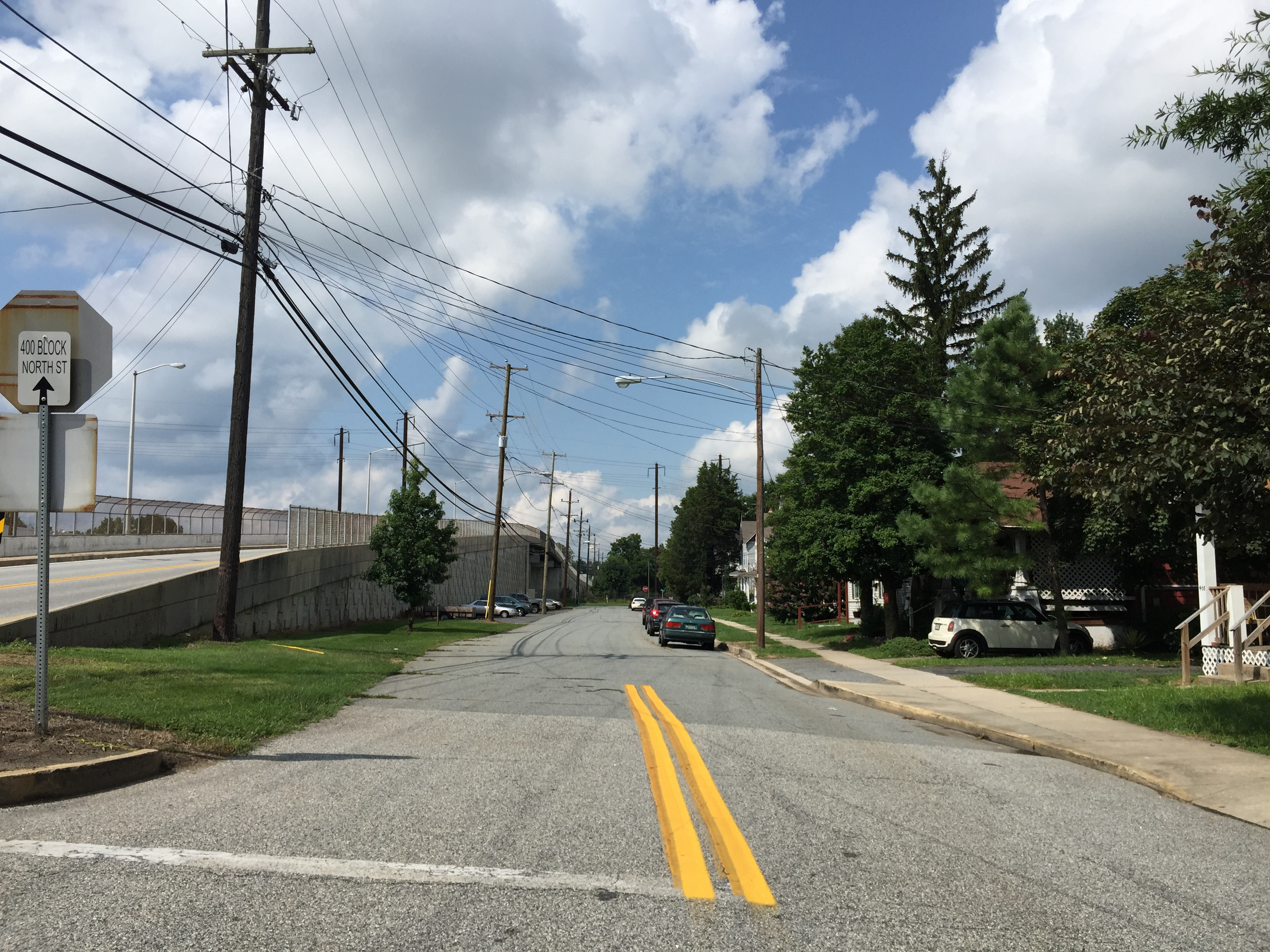
MD 727A at MD 268 in Elkton

Maryland Route 727 is the designation for a pair of streets named Old North Road parallel to MD 268 on either side of Amtrak's Northeast Corridor in Elkton in northeastern Cecil County.

- MD 727 has a length of 0.12 miles (0.19 km) and parallels MD 268 (North Street) on the north side of the railroad.
- MD 727A is 0.09 miles (0.14 km) long and parallels MD 268 on the south side of the rail line.

The two sections of MD 727 were part of the original course of MD 279. North Street became MD 268 after MD 279 was extended west to US 40 to bypass the center of Elkton in 1968. North Street was paved as a 15-foot-wide (4.6 m) concrete road by 1921. The original North Street overpass of the Pennsylvania Railroad (now Amtrak) was constructed between 1930 and 1934. The bypassed street stubs to the closed grade crossing were designated MD 727 and MD 727A in 1949.

=== References ===
Browse numbered routes
← MD 726	→ MD 731

== MD 731 ==
Maryland Route 731
- Location: Vienna

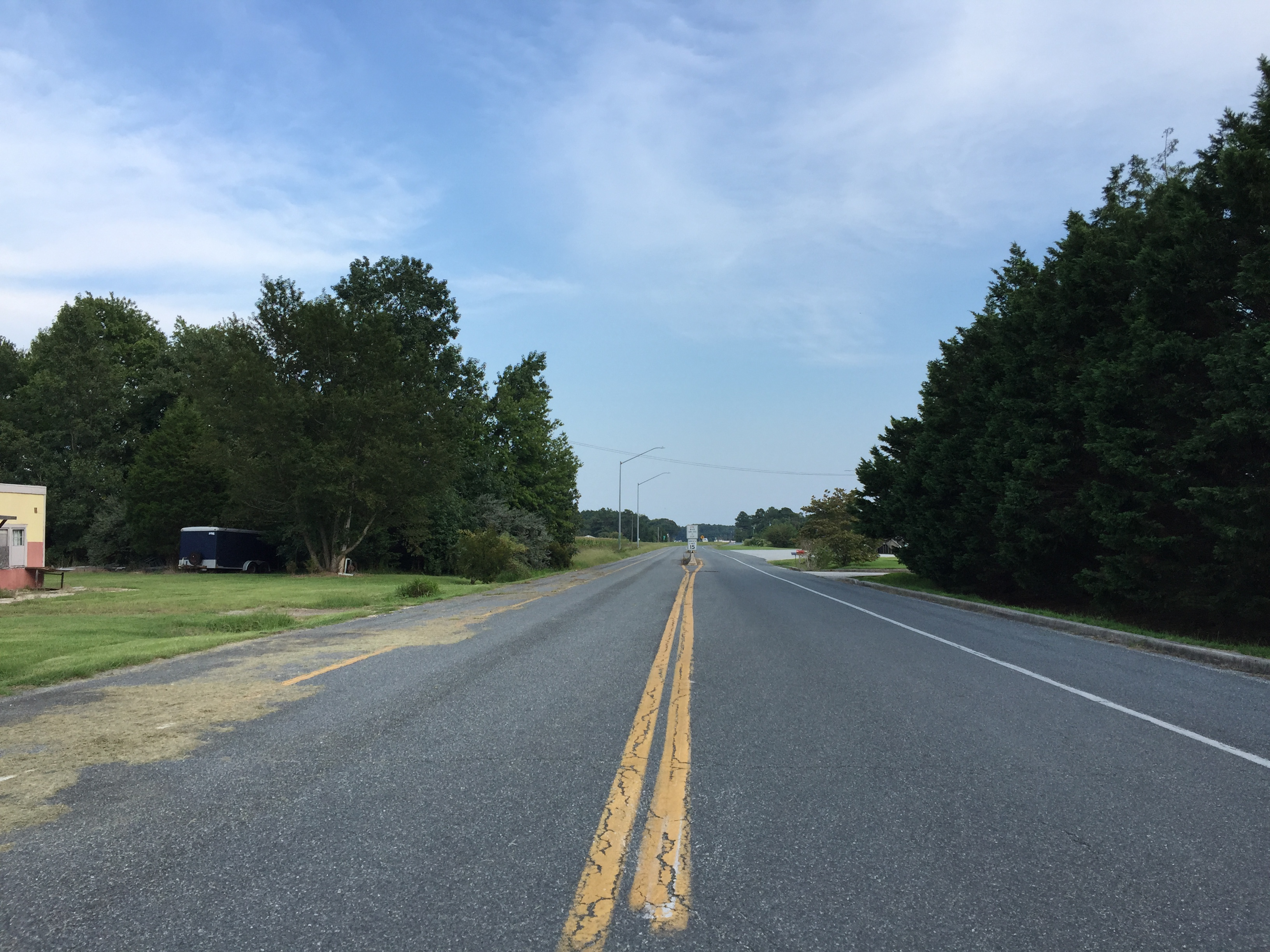
MD 731A near Vienna

Maryland Route 731 is the unsigned designation for a pair of service roads in Wicomico County just east of the Nanticoke River. MD 731A (Marsh Road) is a 0.38-mile (0.61 km) highway that comprises part of the alignment of US 50 prior to the bypass of Vienna. West of MD 731C (Old Bradley Road), a 0.13-mile (0.21 km) connector between US 50 and MD 731A, MD 731A is a two-way road heading west toward a fence at the marshland lining the river. East of MD 731C, MD 731A is one-way eastbound and passes through a truck weigh station.

MD 731 once consisted of Old Ocean Gateway on the Dorchester County side as well, including the entire length of the former approach to the Nanticoke River after the drawbridge span was dismantled. It was shortened in the mid-2000s: the Dorchester side is now maintained by the town of Vienna, and the Wicomico side has been privatized to Delmarva Power as an access road to the transmission crossing over the river.

Browse numbered routes
← MD 727	→ MD 732

== MD 732 ==
Maryland Route 732
- Location: Savage

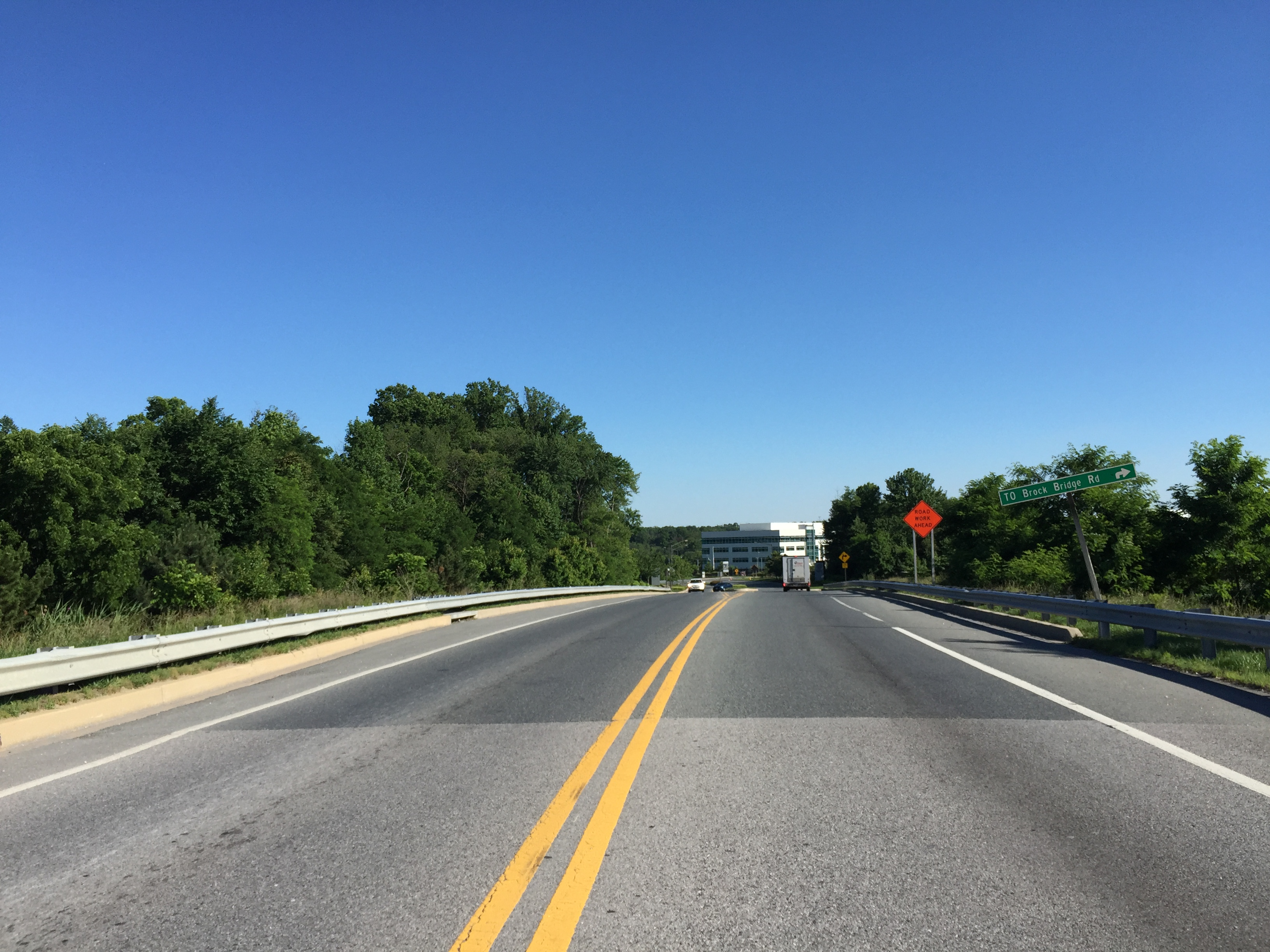
View south along MD 732R in Anne Arundel County

Maryland Route 732 is the designation for two separate roads near MD 32 in Anne Arundel and Howard counties:

- MD 732R is the designation for the portions of Dorsey Run Road between Brock Bridge Road in Anne Arundel County and the bridge over CSX's Capital Subdivision in Savage, Howard County and at the interchange with MD 32 in Savage. Including a gap in maintenance, the route is 0.82 mi (1.32 km) long. The route originally ran continuously from Brock Bridge Road in Anne Arundel County north to Guilford Road in Savage. In 2011, the portions between the CSX bridge and the MD 32 interchange and from the MD 32 interchange to Guilford Road were transferred to Howard County.
- MD 732V is the designation for a 0.12-mile (0.19 km) portion of Great Star Drive at its interchange with MD 32 in Columbia, Howard County.

Browse numbered routes
← MD 731	→ MD 733

== MD 733 ==
Maryland Route 733
- Location: Grantsville, Finzel

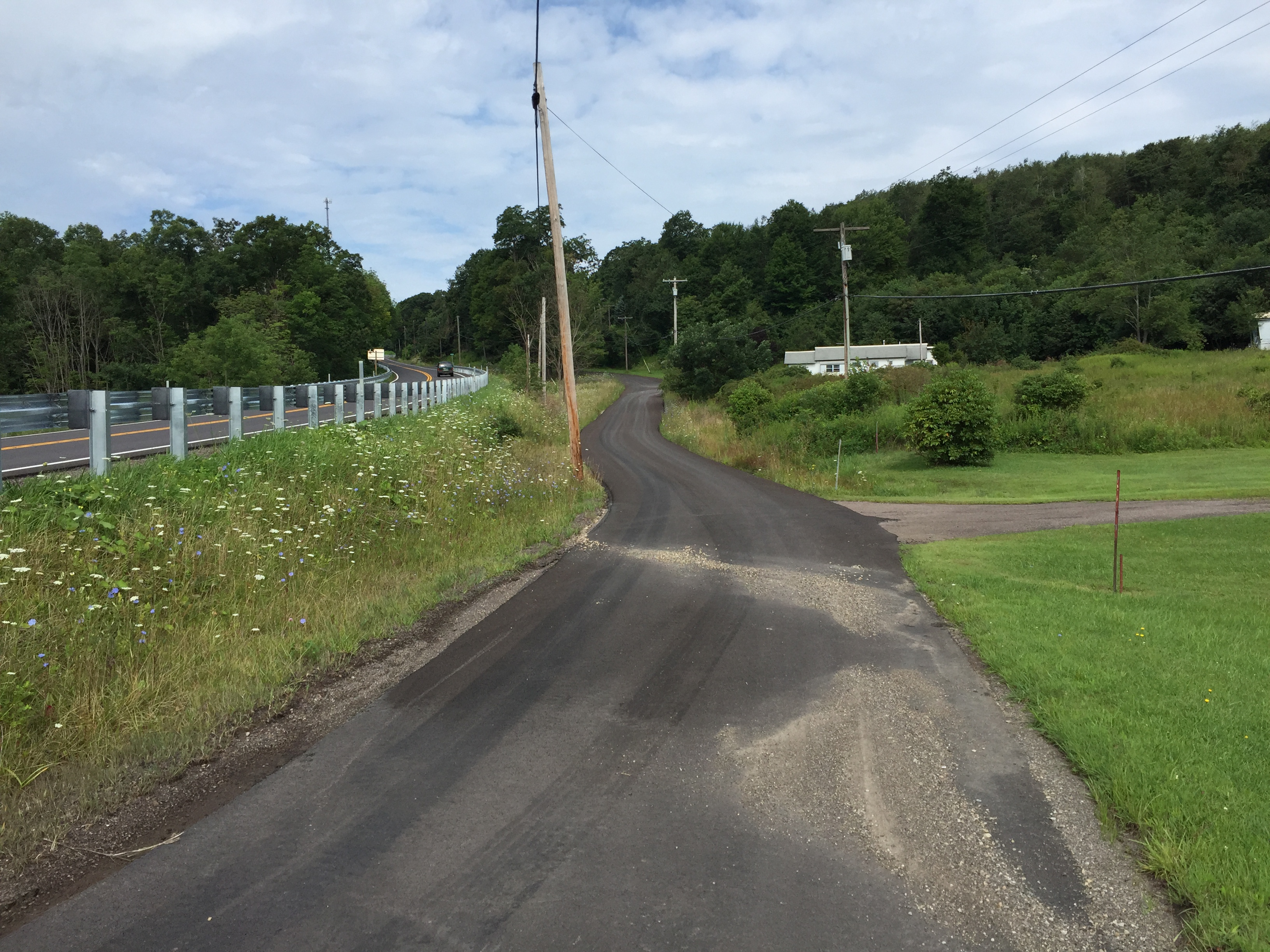
MD 733B at US 40 Alt. in Piney Grove

Maryland Route 733 is the unsigned designation for an unnamed 0.05-mile (0.080 km) dirt road that extends east from US 40 Alternate just west of Shade Run west of Grantsville.

- MD 733A is the unsigned designation for an unnamed 0.14-mile (0.23 km) section of the old alignment of US 40 just east of MD 946 in Finzel. The state highway starts at US 40 Alternate and heads west around a curve, crossing the Little Savage River before reaching a dead end.
- MD 733B is the unsigned designation for Guthrie Lane, a 0.16-mile (0.26 km) loop off of US 40 Alternate near Finzel that served as a former alignment of that route. The route was designated in 2014.
- MD 733C is the unsigned designation for Hemlock Loop, a 0.20-mile (0.32 km) loop to the north of US 40 near Keyser's Ridge, following an old alignment of US 40. The route was designated in 2018.

Browse numbered routes
← MD 732	→ MD 735

== MD 735 ==
Maryland Route 735
- Location: Hancock
- Length: 0.06 mi (97 m)

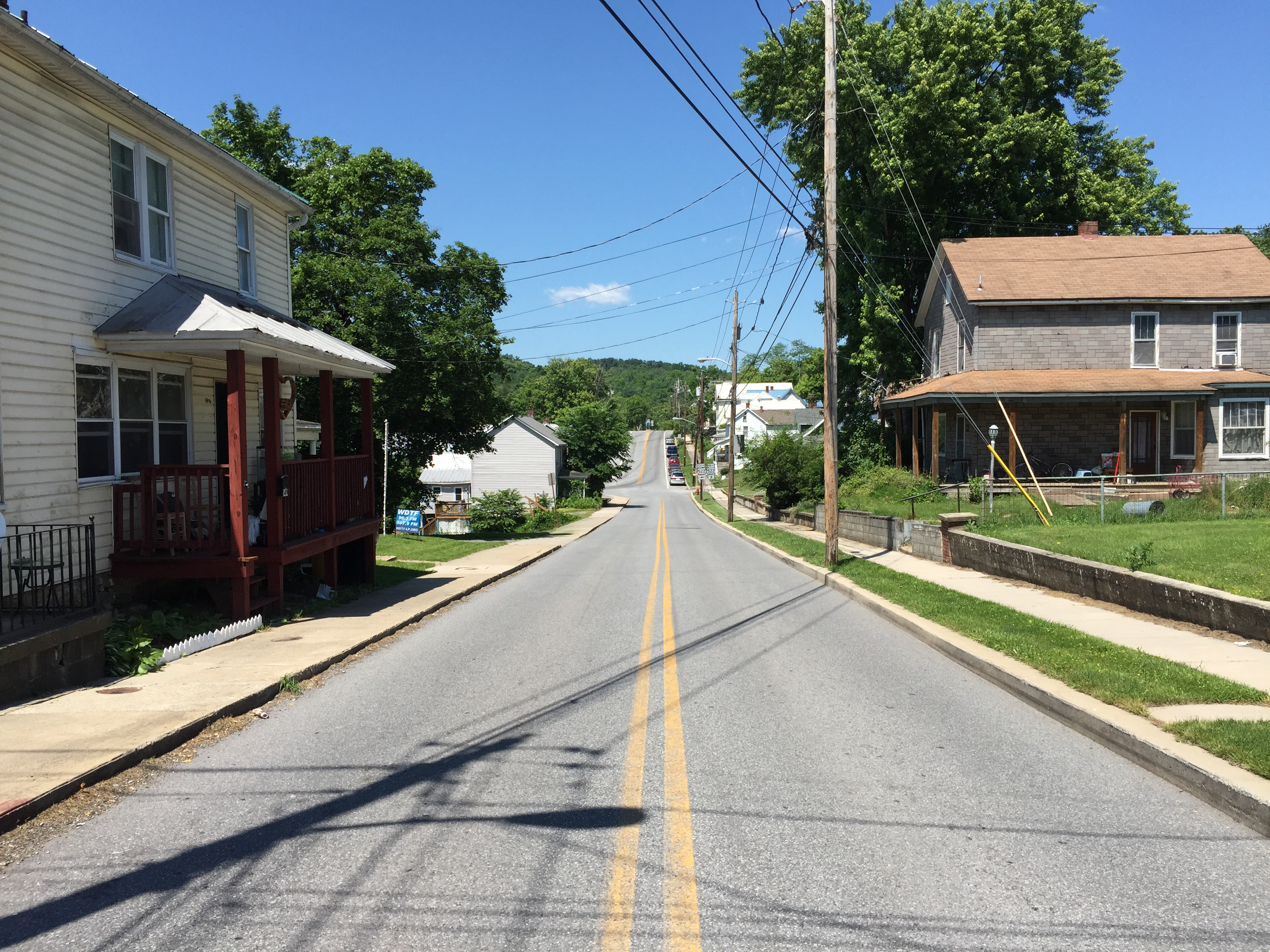
MD 735 in Hancock

Maryland Route 735 is the designation for a 0.06-mile (0.097 km) section of High Street from Virginia Avenue east to near Methodist Street within Hancock. High Street west of Virginia Avenue and Virginia Avenue south of High Street are part of US 522C, which is a connector between northbound US 522 and MD 144.

Browse numbered routes
← MD 733	→ MD 736

== MD 739 ==
Maryland Route 739
- Location: Washington County
- Length: 0.16 mi (260 m)
- Existed: 2019–present

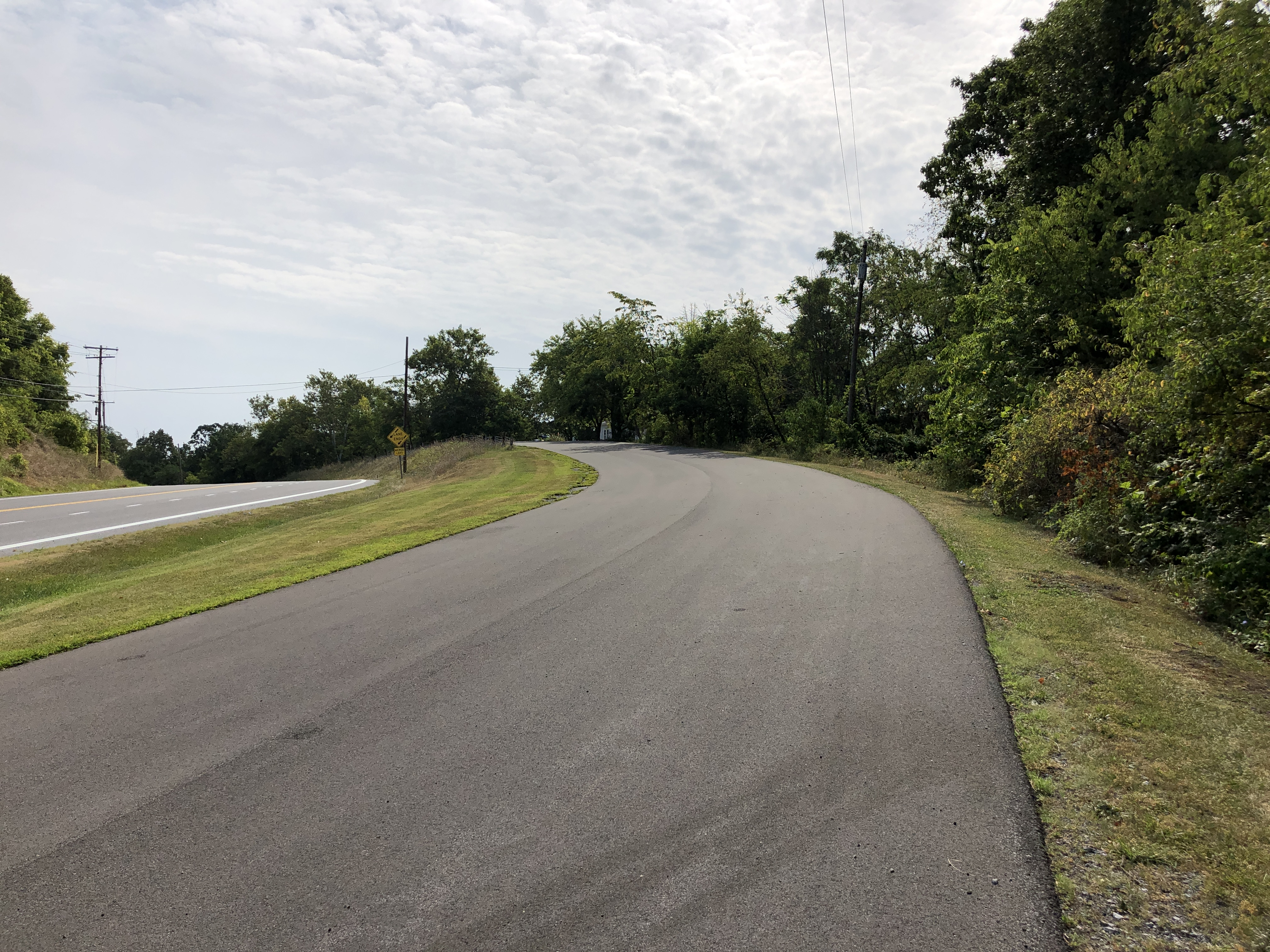
MD 739A eastbound at US 40 in Washington County

Maryland Route 739A is the designation for a 0.16-mile (0.26 km) unnamed road that is an old alignment of US 40 in Washington County. The route was designated in 2019.

Browse numbered routes
← MD 736	→ MD 740

== MD 740 ==
Maryland Route 740
- Location: Aberdeen
- Length: 0.29 mi (470 m)
- Existed: 2015–present

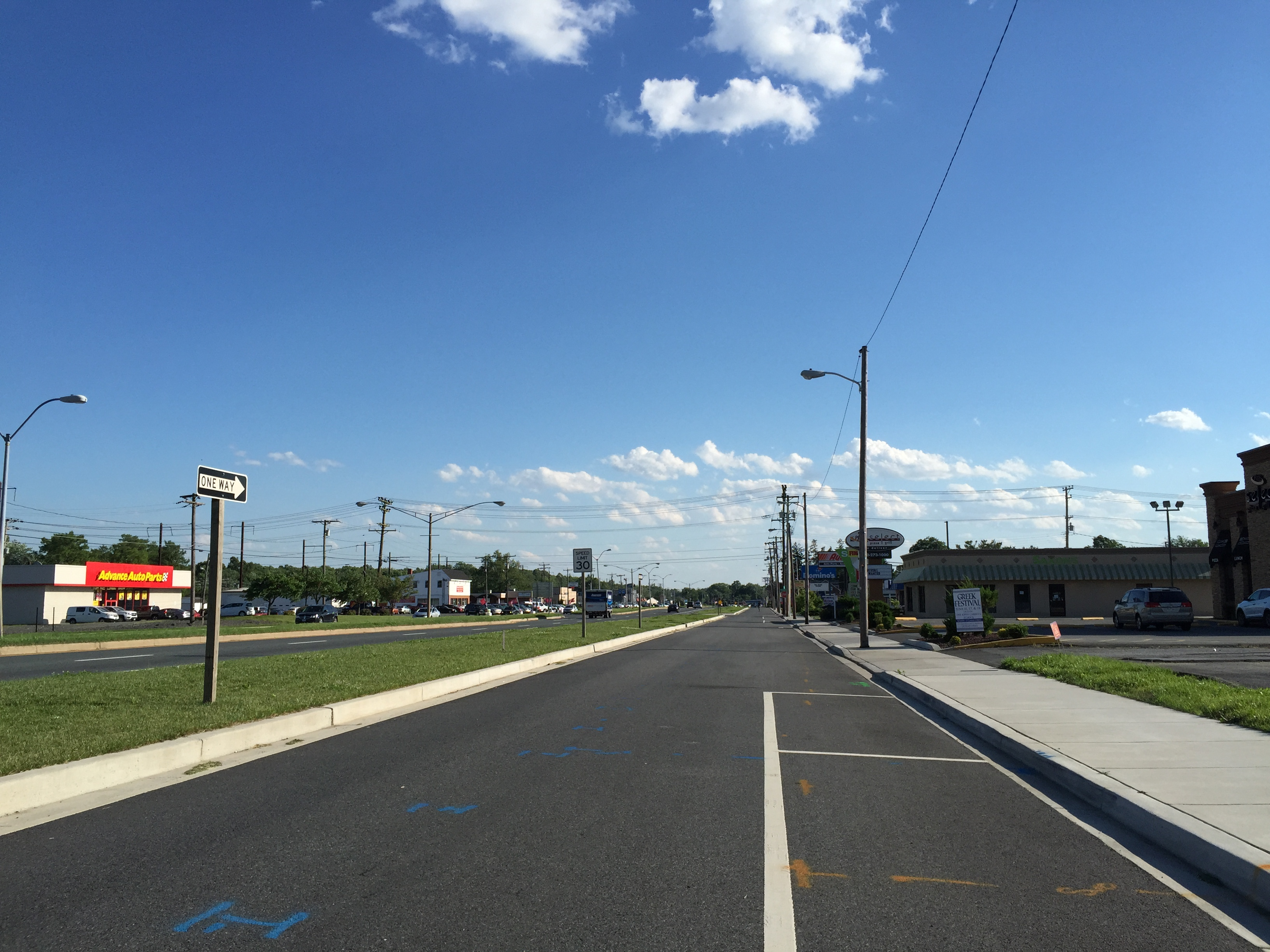
View west along MD 740 at Market Street in Aberdeen

Maryland Route 740B is the designation for South Philadelphia Boulevard, a 0.29-mile (0.47 km) service road on the north side of US 40, extending from just east of Buchanan Lane west to Plater Street in Aberdeen, Harford County. The route was designated in 2015.

Browse numbered routes
← MD 739	→ MD 741

== MD 741 ==
Maryland Route 741
- Location: Benevola
- Length: 0.06 mi (97 m)

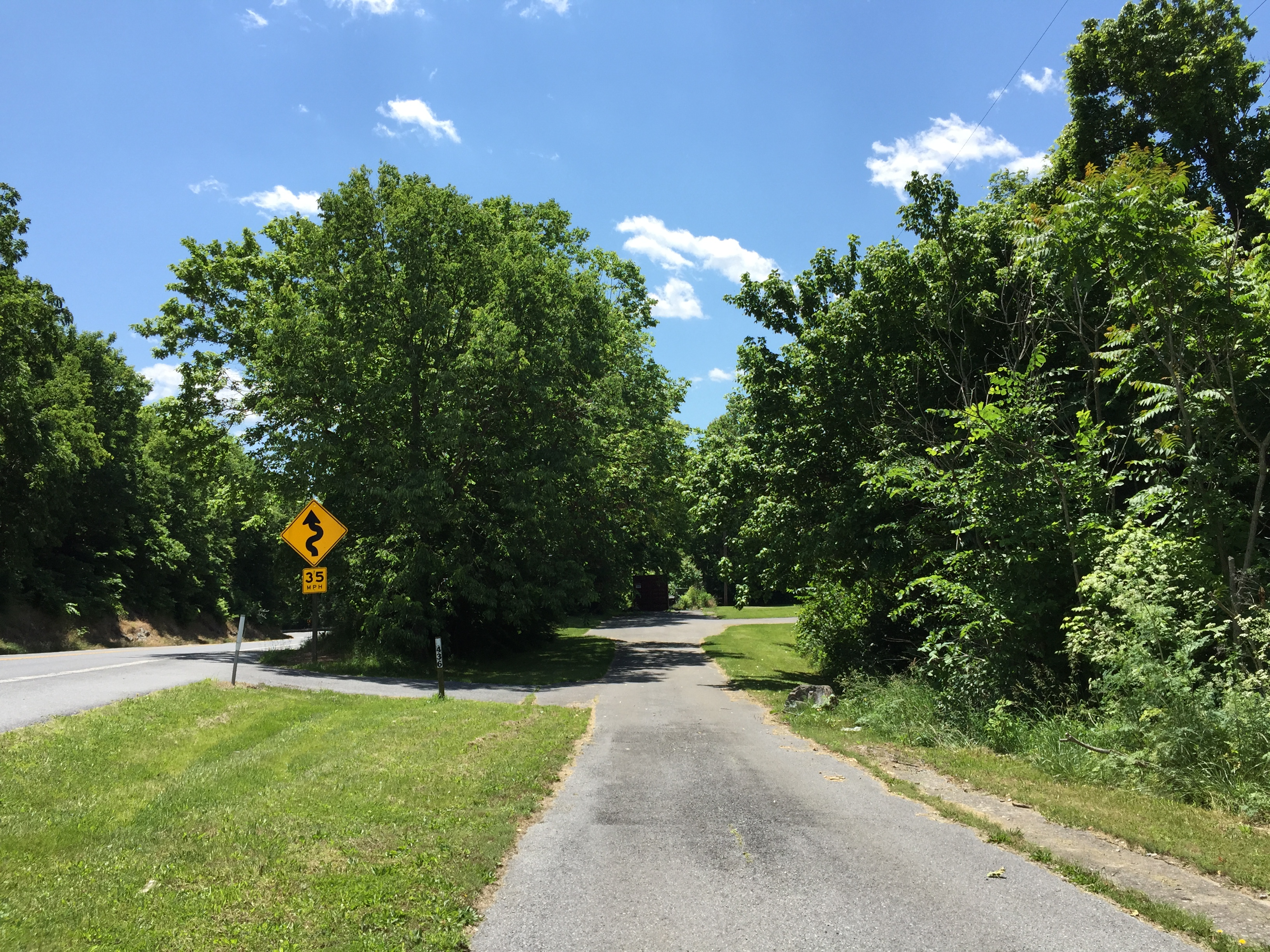
MD 741 at US 40 Alt. in Benevola

Maryland Route 741 is the unsigned designation for an unnamed 0.06-mile (0.097 km) spur of old alignment from US 40 Alternate to a dead end adjacent to Antietam Creek near Benevola.

Browse numbered routes
← MD 740	→ MD 742

== MD 742 ==
Maryland Route 742
- Location: Friendsville
- Length: 0.93 mi (1,500 m)

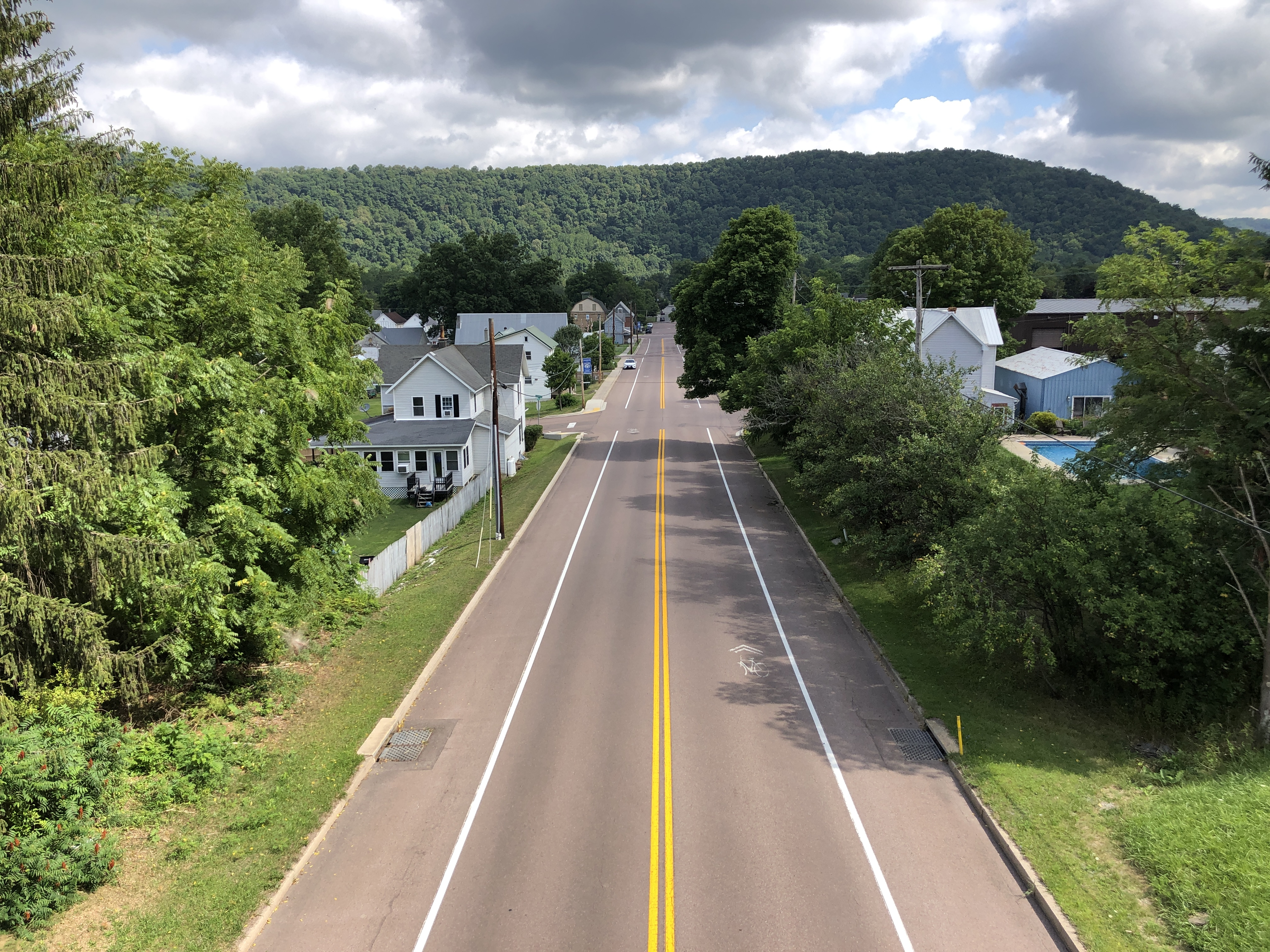
MD 742 northbound in Friendsville

Maryland Route 742 is the designation for a 0.93-mile (1.50 km) section of the old alignment of MD 42 through Friendsville in northwestern Garrett County. MD 742, which follows First Avenue and Maple Street, was assigned after MD 42 bypassed Friendsville in 1975.

Browse numbered routes
← MD 741	→ MD 743

== MD 746 ==
Maryland Route 746
- Location: Ruxton
- Length: 0.13 mi (210 m)

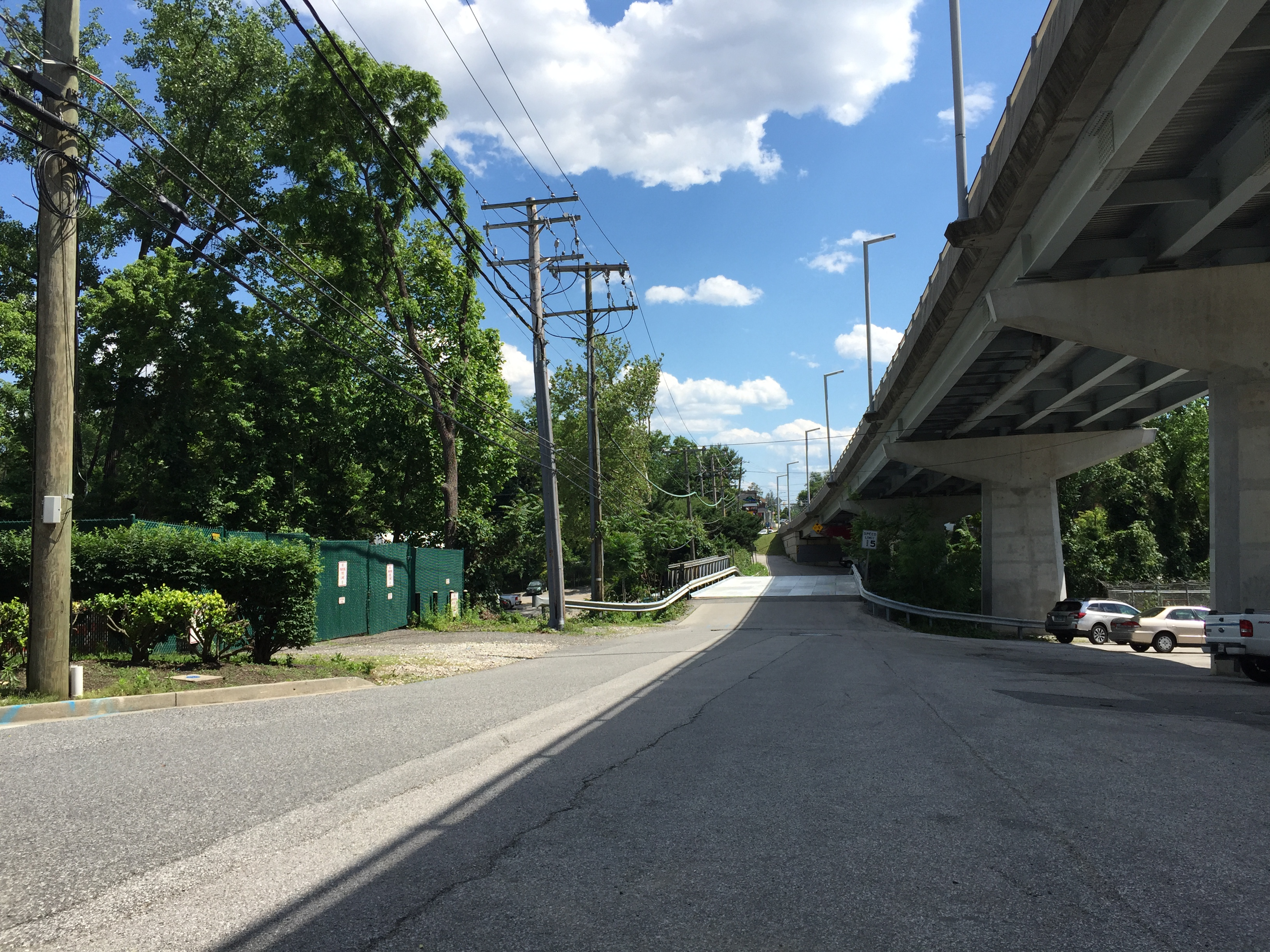
View south from the north end of MD 746 in Ruxton

Maryland Route 746A is the unsigned designation for the access road to the Falls Road station of MTA Maryland's Baltimore Light RailLink. It runs from MD 25 north to a gate in Ruxton, Baltimore County, with an intersection with Lakeside Drive. The route is 0.13 mi (0.21 km) long.

Browse numbered routes
← MD 743	→ MD 750

== MD 750 ==
Maryland Route 750
- Location: Cambridge
- Length: 0.87 mi (1,400 m)

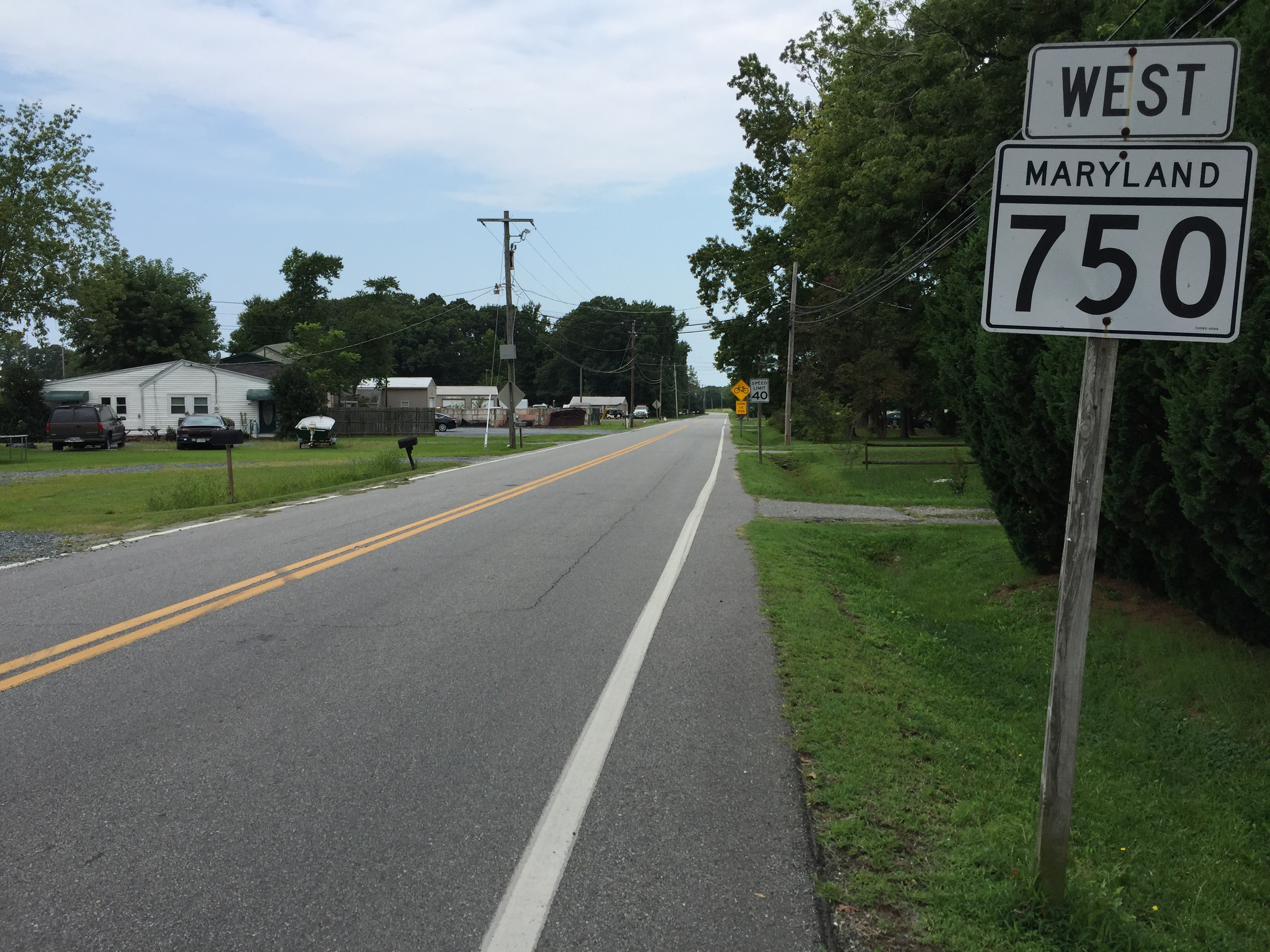
View west along MD 750 near Cambridge

Maryland Route 750 is the designation for a stretch of the old alignment of US 50 that runs 0.87 mi (1.40 km) between intersections with US 50 at Bucktown Road and just west of Aireys Spur Road east of Cambridge. The road is known as Old Route 50.

Browse numbered routes
← MD 746	→ MD 755

== MD 759 ==
Maryland Route 759B
- Location: Stevensville
- Length: 0.21 mi (340 m)

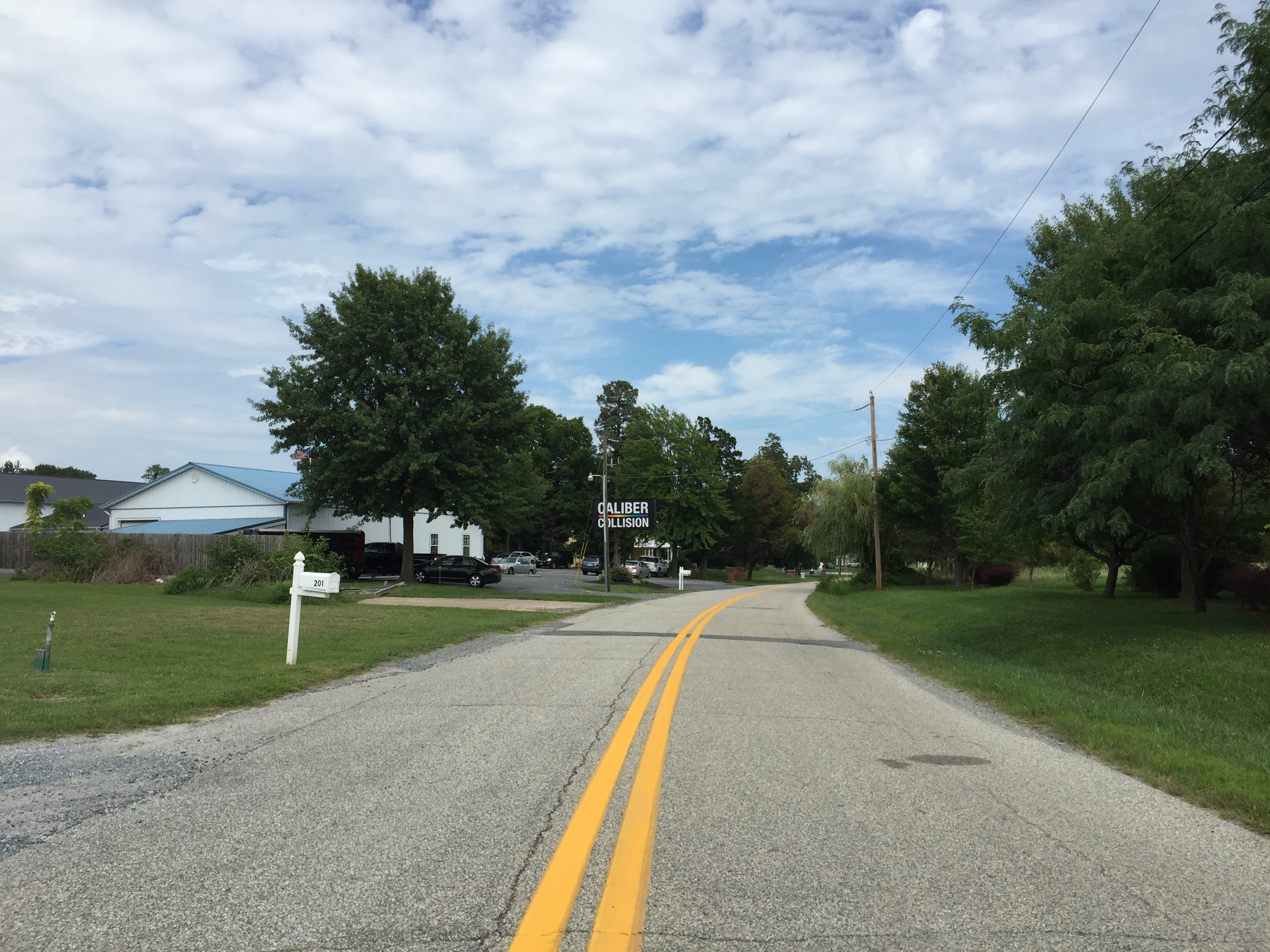
MD 759 in Stevensville

Maryland Route 759B is the unsigned designation for a 0.21 mi (0.34 km) stretch of Love Point Road that runs from a dead end adjacent to US 50 and US 301's interchange with MD 8 east to MD 18 in Stevensville.

Browse numbered routes
← MD 758	→ MD 760

== MD 761 ==
Maryland Route 761
- Location: Parran
- Length: 0.23 mi (370 m)

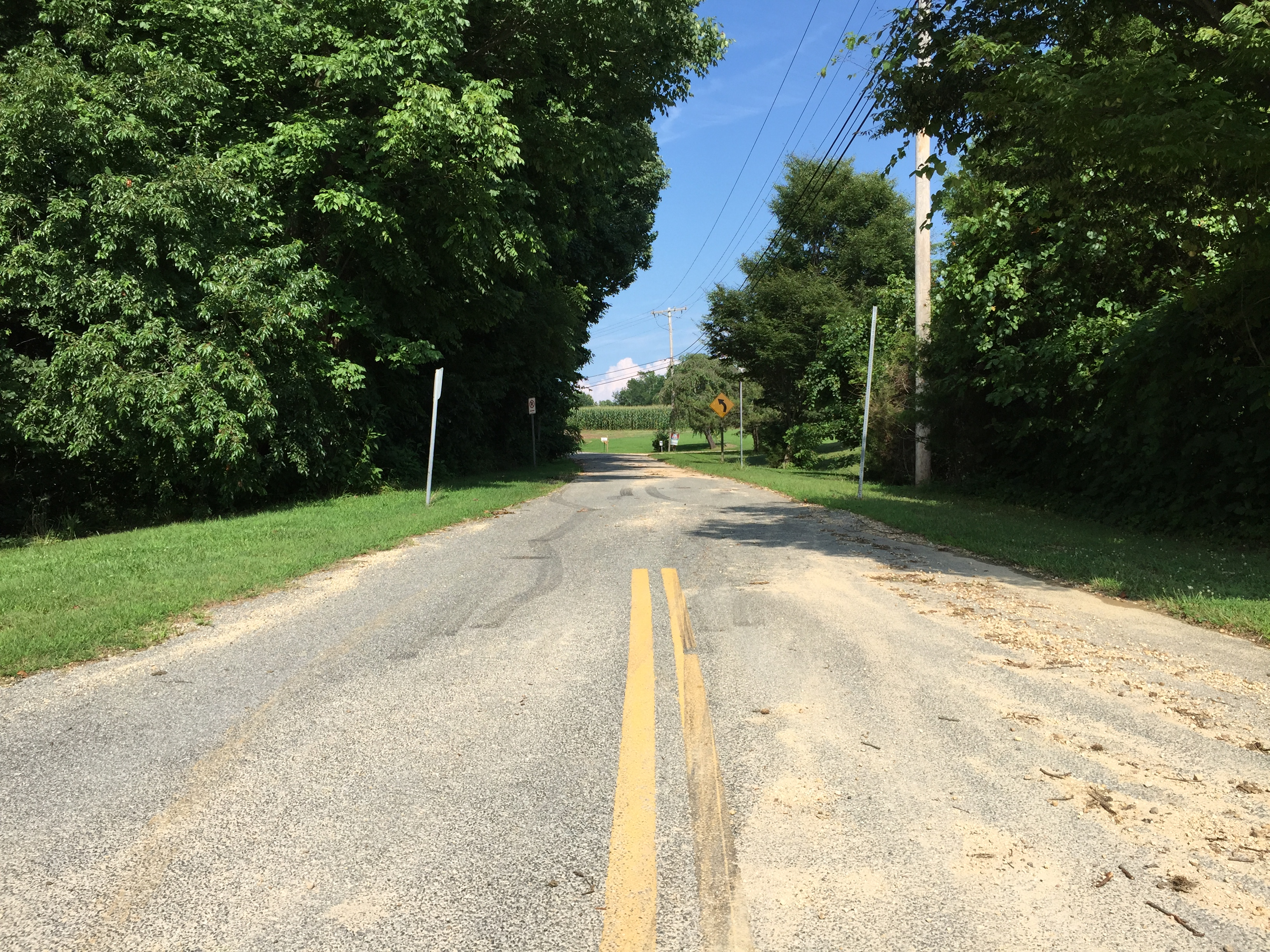
View east along MD 761 at MD 263 in Parran

Maryland Route 761 is the designation for Old Plum Point Road, a 0.23-mile (0.37 km) loop of old alignment of MD 263 near Parran.

Browse numbered routes
← MD 760	→ MD 762

== MD 762 ==
Maryland Route 762
- Location: Anne Arundel County
- Length: 0.53 mi (850 m)

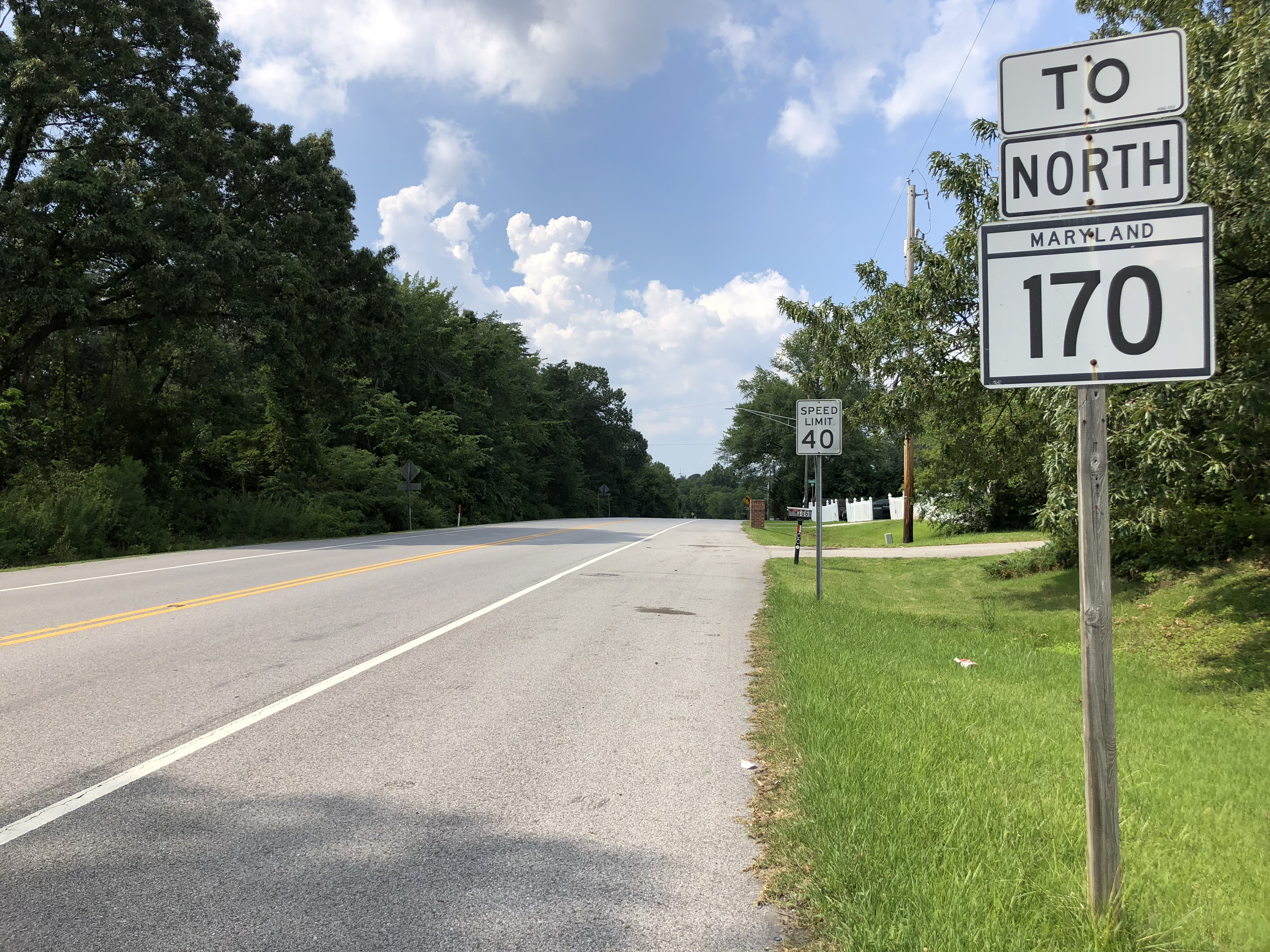
View northwest from the southeast end of MD 762 at MD 162 in Ferndale

Maryland Route 762 is the unsigned designation for a portion of Andover Road running from MD 162 in Ferndale northwest to MD 170 in Linthicum, Anne Arundel County. The route is 0.53 mi (0.85 km) long.

Browse numbered routes
← MD 761	→ MD 763

== MD 763 ==
Maryland Route 763
- Location: Havre de Grace
- Length: 0.28 mi (450 m)
- Tourist routes: Lower Susquehanna Scenic Byway

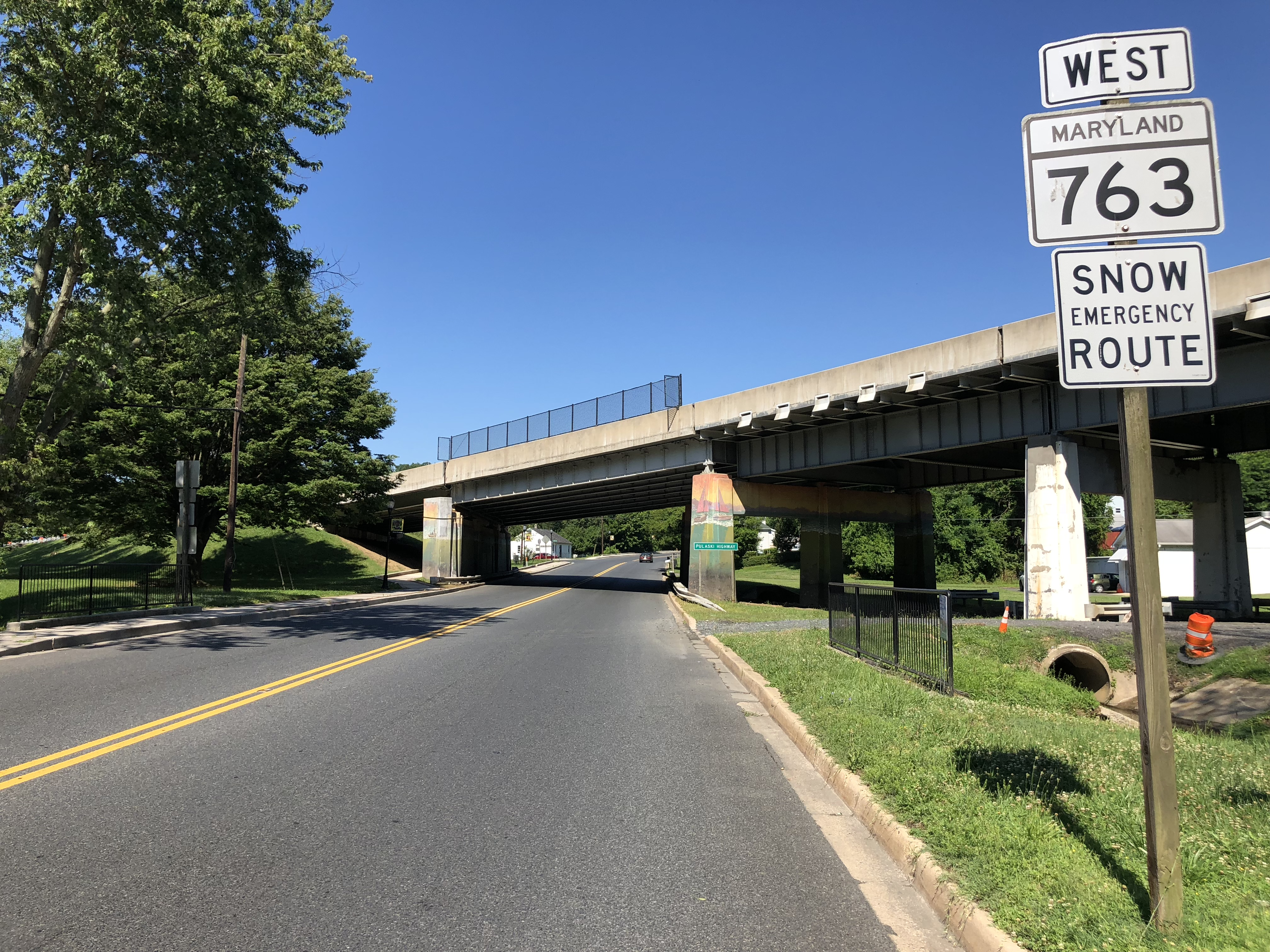
View west along MD 763 in Havre de Grace

Maryland Route 763 is the signed designation for the 0.28-mile (0.45 km) section of Superior Street from MD 155, which follows Superior Street to the west and turns south onto Ohio Street, east to Juniata Street within Havre de Grace.

Browse numbered routes
← MD 762	→ MD 764

== MD 764 ==
Maryland Route 764
- Location: Calvert County
- Length: 0.09 mi (140 m)

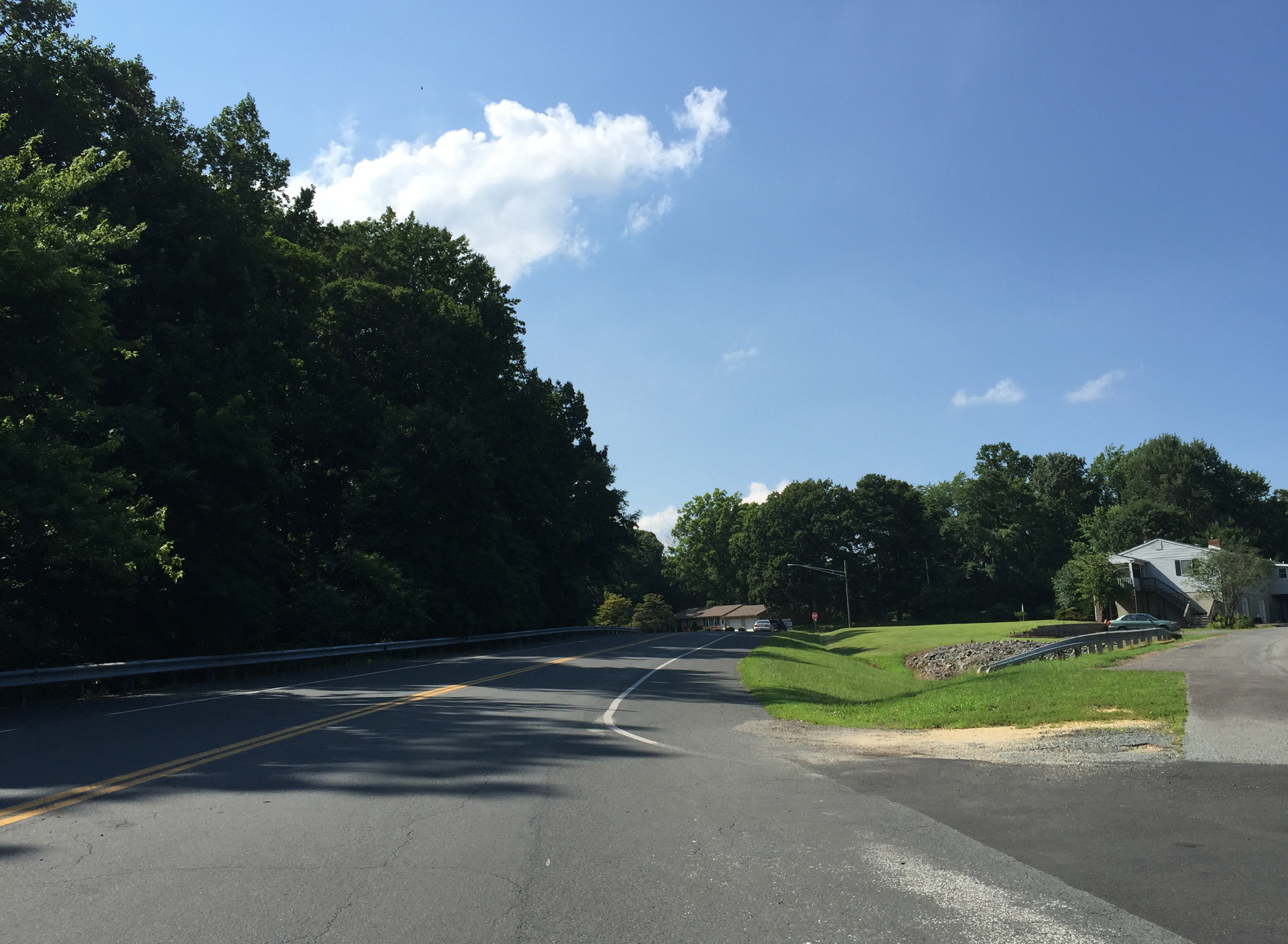
View north along MD 764 in Calvert County

Maryland Route 764 is the designation for a 0.09-mile (0.14 km) section of Breezy Point Road from MD 261 south to its intersection with Pinewood Terrace northeast of Parran in Calvert County. MD 764A is the designation for Old Willows Road, a 0.06-mile (0.097 km) section of old alignment of MD 261 that runs north from the intersection of MD 764 and Pinewood Terrace to a dead end.

Browse numbered routes
← MD 763	→ MD 765

== MD 768 ==
Maryland Route 768
- Location: Dares Beach
- Length: 0.68 mi (1,090 m)

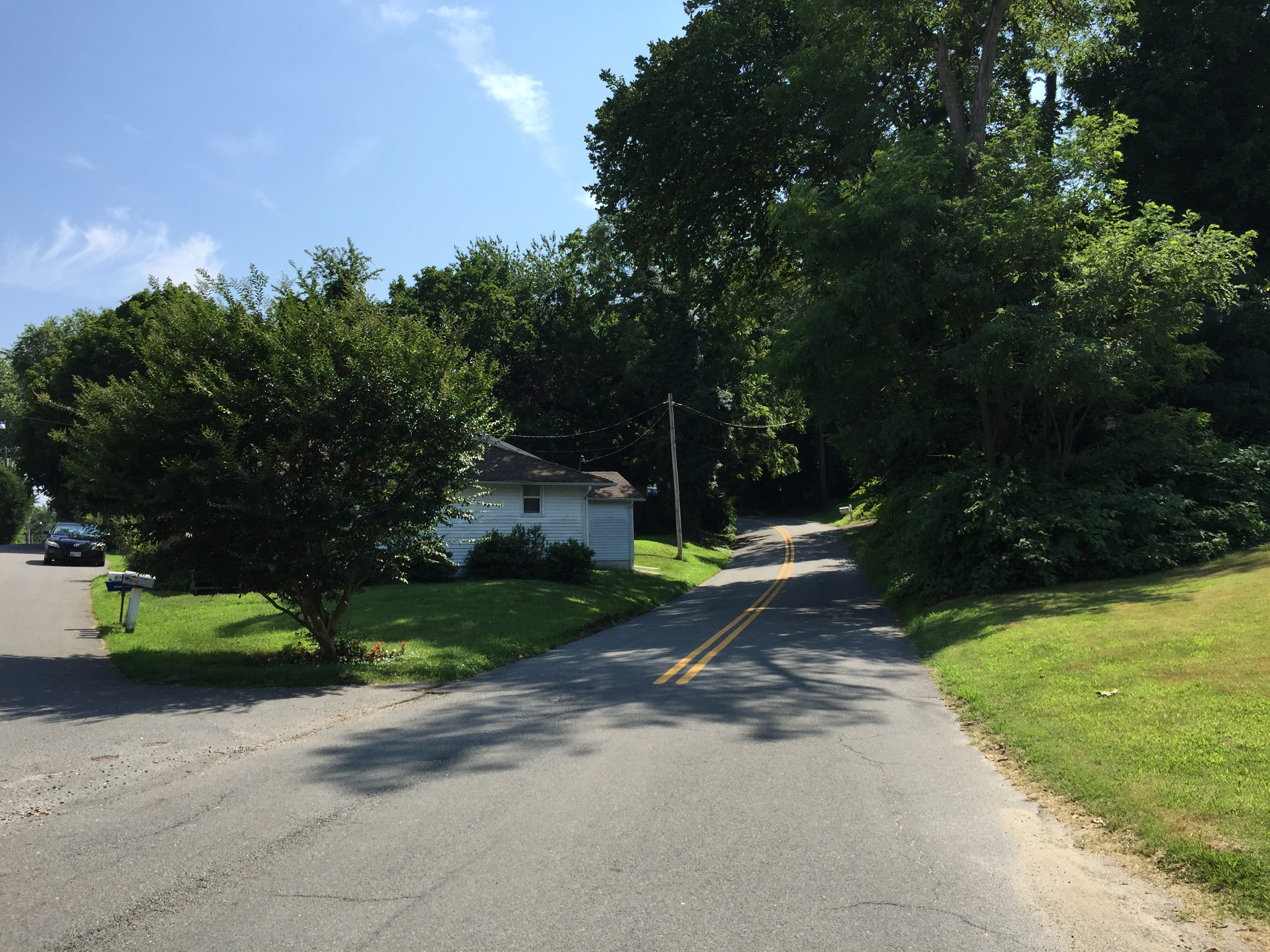
View west along MD 768 in Dares Beach

Maryland Route 768 is the designation for the 0.68-mile (1.09 km) section of old alignment of MD 402 in Dares Beach. The state highway heads northeast from MD 402 a short distance west of the latter highway's northern terminus along Dares Wharf Road. Within the Dares Beach community, MD 768 turns east onto Virginia Street, which the highway follows to its eastern terminus at Chesapeake Avenue.

Browse numbered routes
← MD 765	→ MD 769

== MD 776 ==
Maryland Route 776
- Location: Ridgely
- Length: 0.77 mi (1,240 m)

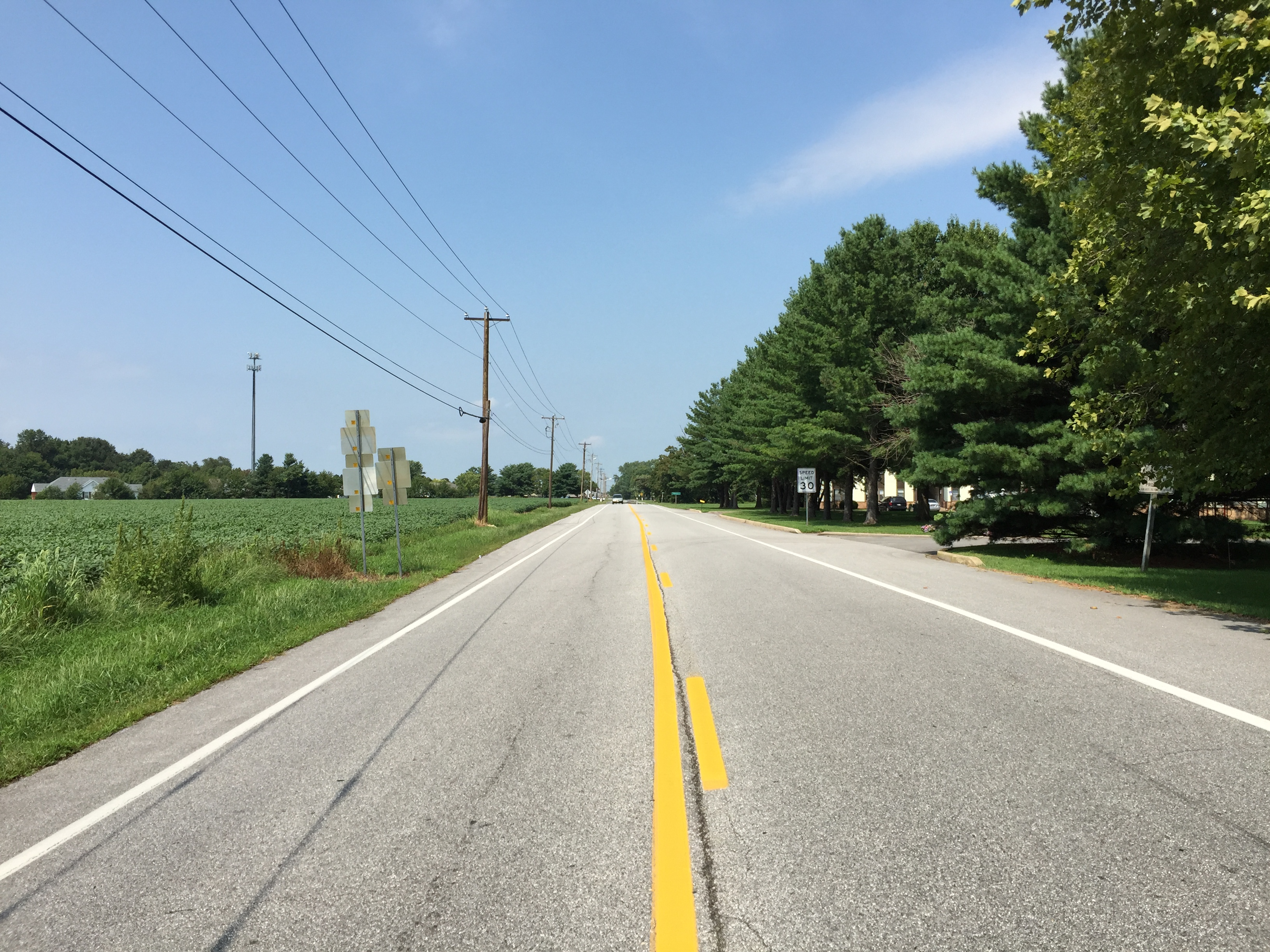
View north along MD 776 at MD 312/MD 480 in Ridgely

Maryland Route 776 is the unsigned designation for Sunset Boulevard and Railroad Avenue, which together run 0.77 mi (1.24 km) from MD 480 and MD 312 (Ridgely Road) north to MD 312 (Central Avenue) within Ridgely.

- MD 776A is the unsigned designation for a 0.09-mile (0.14 km) section of the old alignment of MD 312 that intersects Cow Barn Road north of Ridgely.

Browse numbered routes
← MD 769	→ MD 778

== MD 779 ==
Maryland Route 779
- Location: Glen Burnie
- Length: 0.15 mi (240 m)

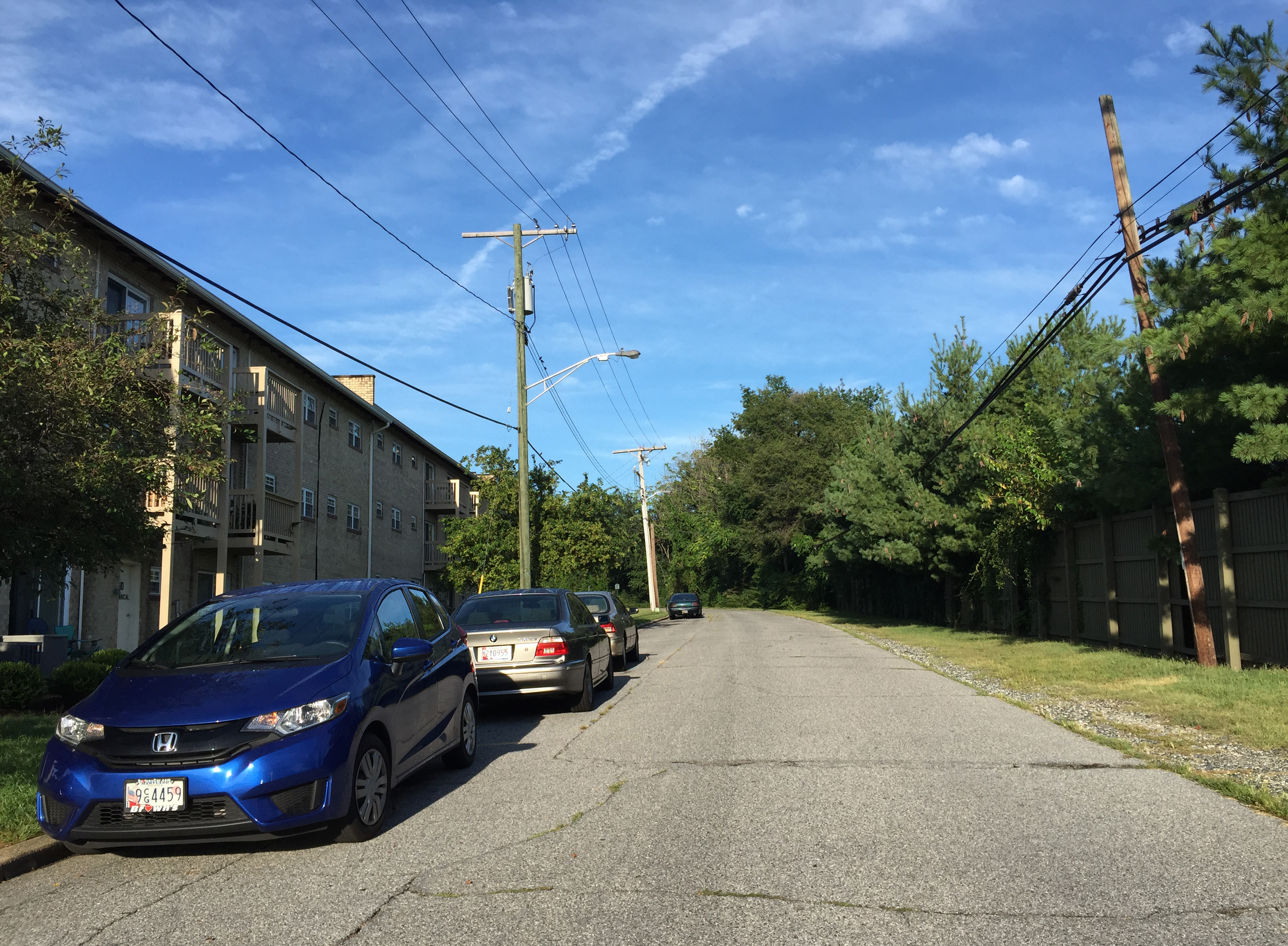
View west along MD 779 at MD 174 in Glen Burnie

Maryland Route 779 is the designation for Old Quarterfield Road, which runs from a dead end east to MD 174 in Glen Burnie, Anne Arundel County. The route is 0.15 mi (0.24 km) long.

- MD 779A is the designation for Gaither Road, which runs Parke West Drive east to the end of state maintenance at a private driveway in Glen Burnie, Anne Arundel County. The route is 0.14 mi (0.23 km) long.

Browse numbered routes
← MD 778	→ MD 781

== MD 783 ==
Maryland Route 783
- Location: Parole
- Length: 0.23 mi (370 m)

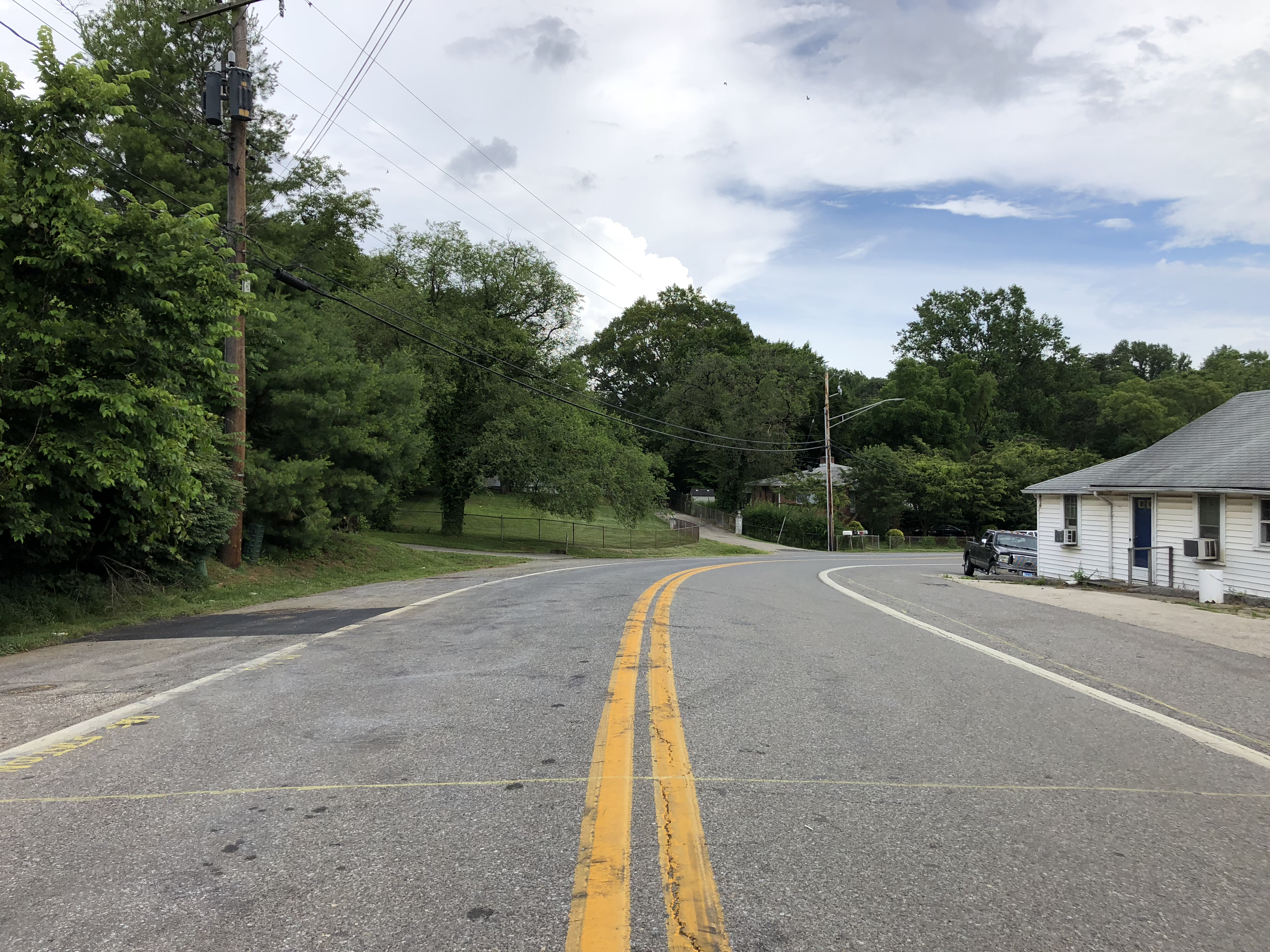
View south at the north end of MD 783 in Parole

Maryland Route 783 is the unsigned designation for a portion of Riverview Avenue in Parole, Anne Arundel County, running from MD 436 north to the end of state maintenance at the intersection with Riverview Court. The route is 0.23 mi (0.37 km) long.

Browse numbered routes
← MD 781	→ MD 784

== MD 784 ==
Maryland Route 784
- Location: Parole
- Length: 0.24 mi (390 m)

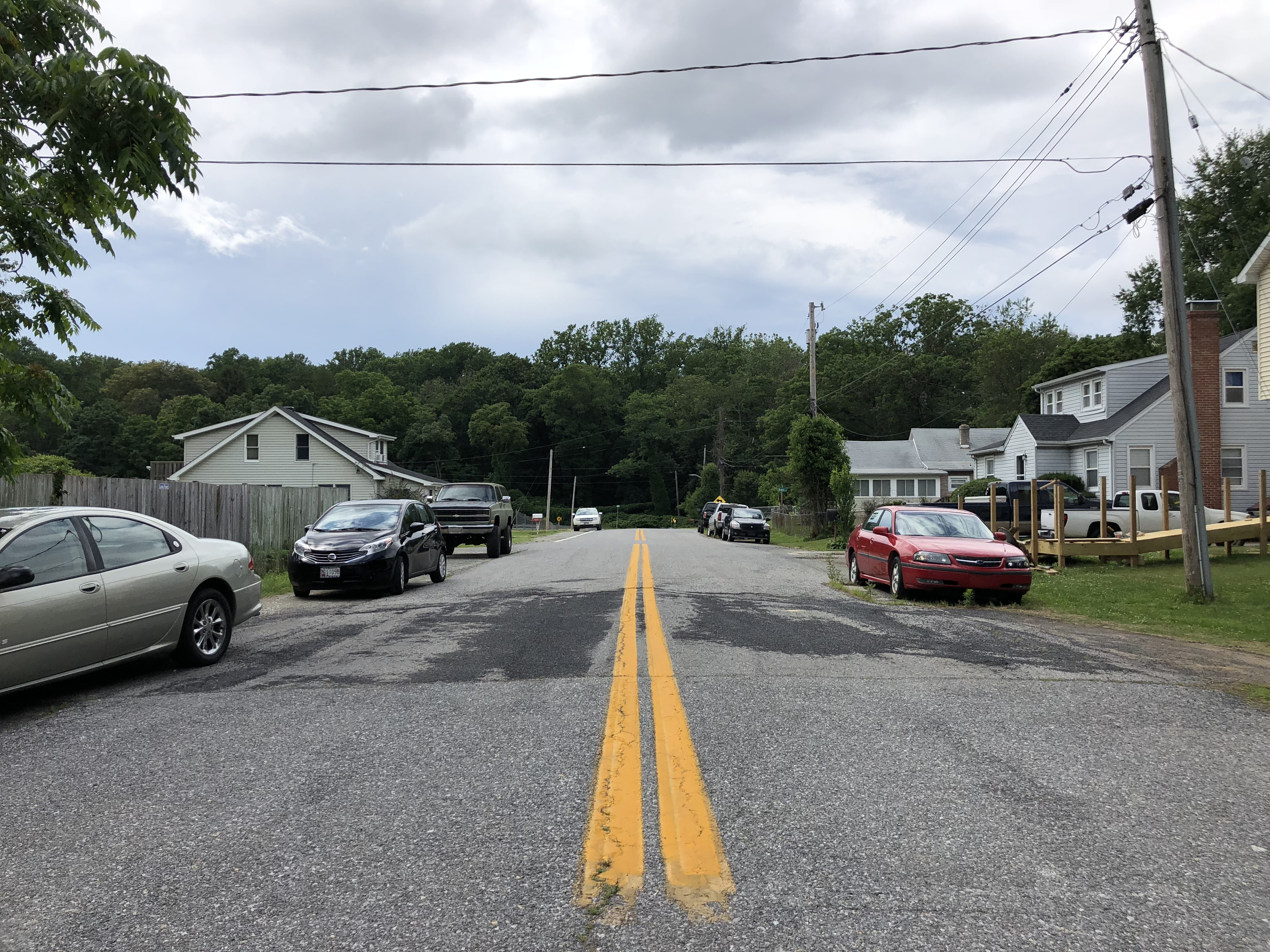
View west from the east end of MD 784 in Parole

Maryland Route 784 is the designation for Acorn Drive in Parole, Anne Arundel County, running from MD 436 east to a dead end, intersecting MD 785. The route is 0.24 mi (0.39 km) long.

Browse numbered routes
← MD 783	→ MD 785

== MD 785 ==
Maryland Route 785
- Location: Parole
- Length: 0.29 mi (470 m)

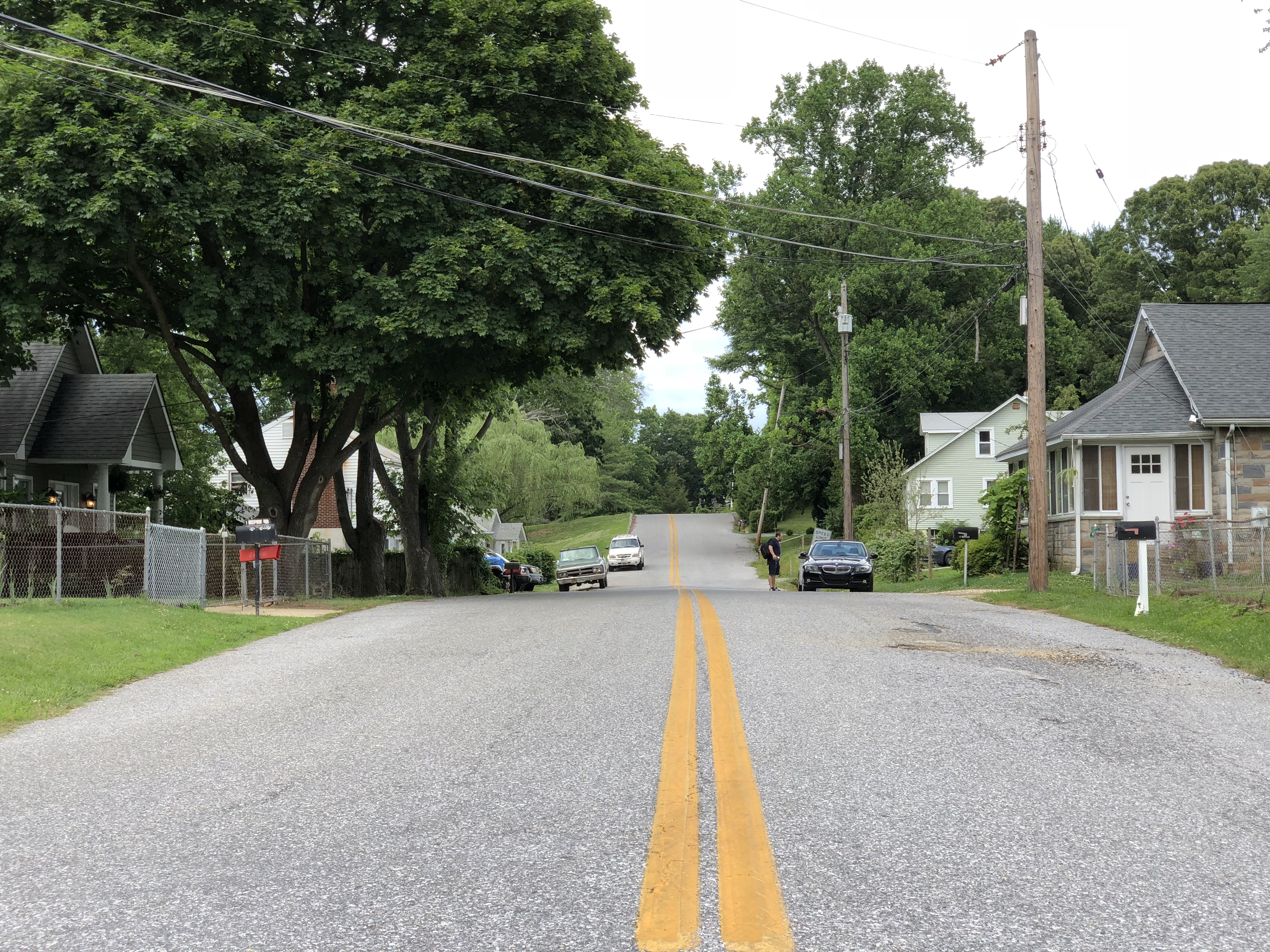
View northeast at the southwest end of MD 785 at MD 784 in Parole

Maryland Route 785 is the unsigned designation for Acorn Drive in Parole, Anne Arundel County, running from MD 784 north to a dead end. The route is 0.29 mi (0.47 km) long.

Browse numbered routes
← MD 784	→ MD 788

== MD 788 ==
Maryland Route 788
- Location: Annapolis
- Length: 0.20 mi (320 m)

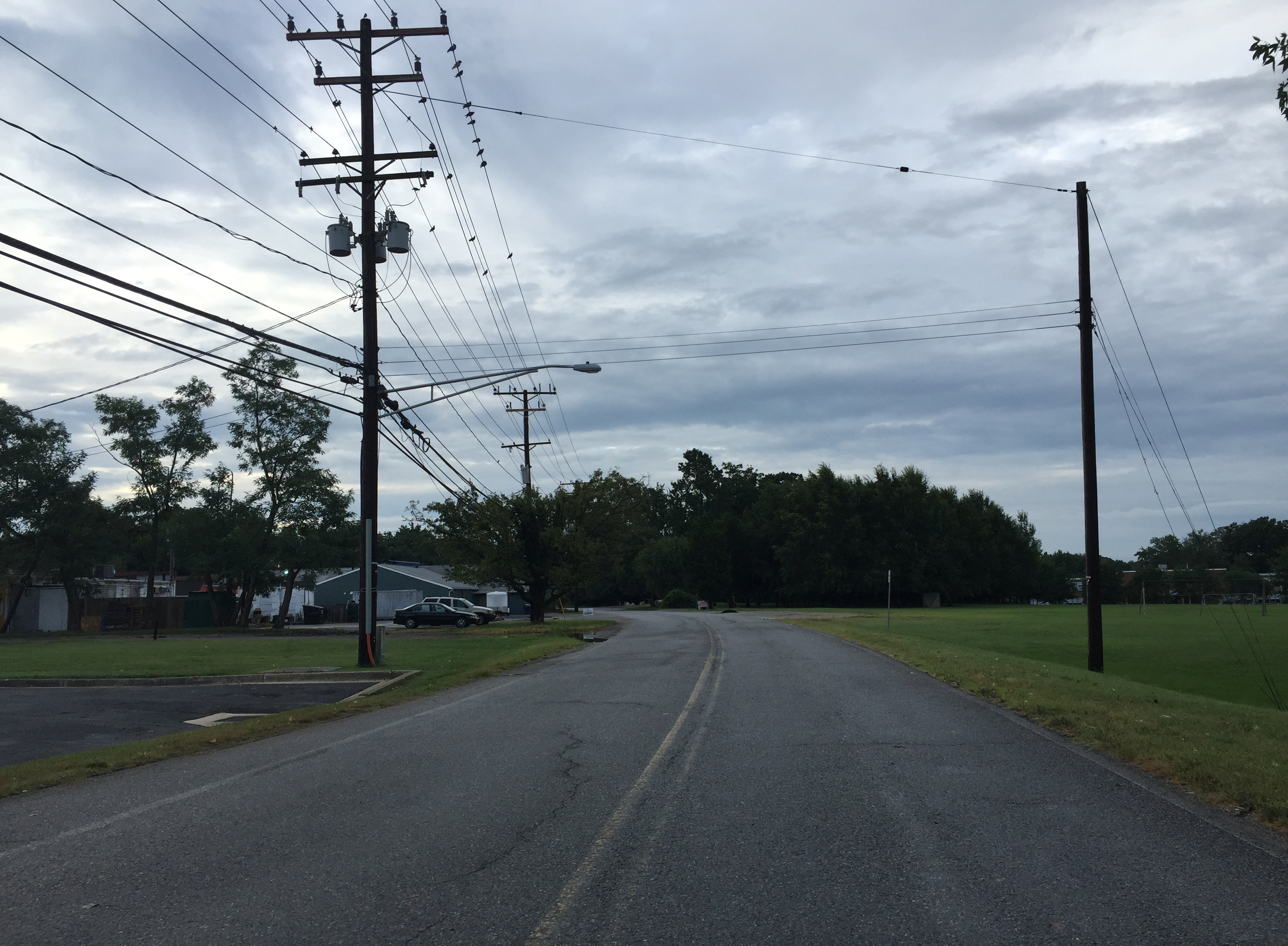
View south along MD 788 at MD 387 in Annapolis

Maryland Route 788 is the unsigned designation for Old Forest Drive in Annapolis, Anne Arundel County, running from MD 387 east to Forest Drive. The route is 0.20 mi (0.32 km) long.

Browse numbered routes
← MD 785	→ MD 794

== MD 795 ==
Maryland Route 795
- Location: Reisterstown, Cambridge

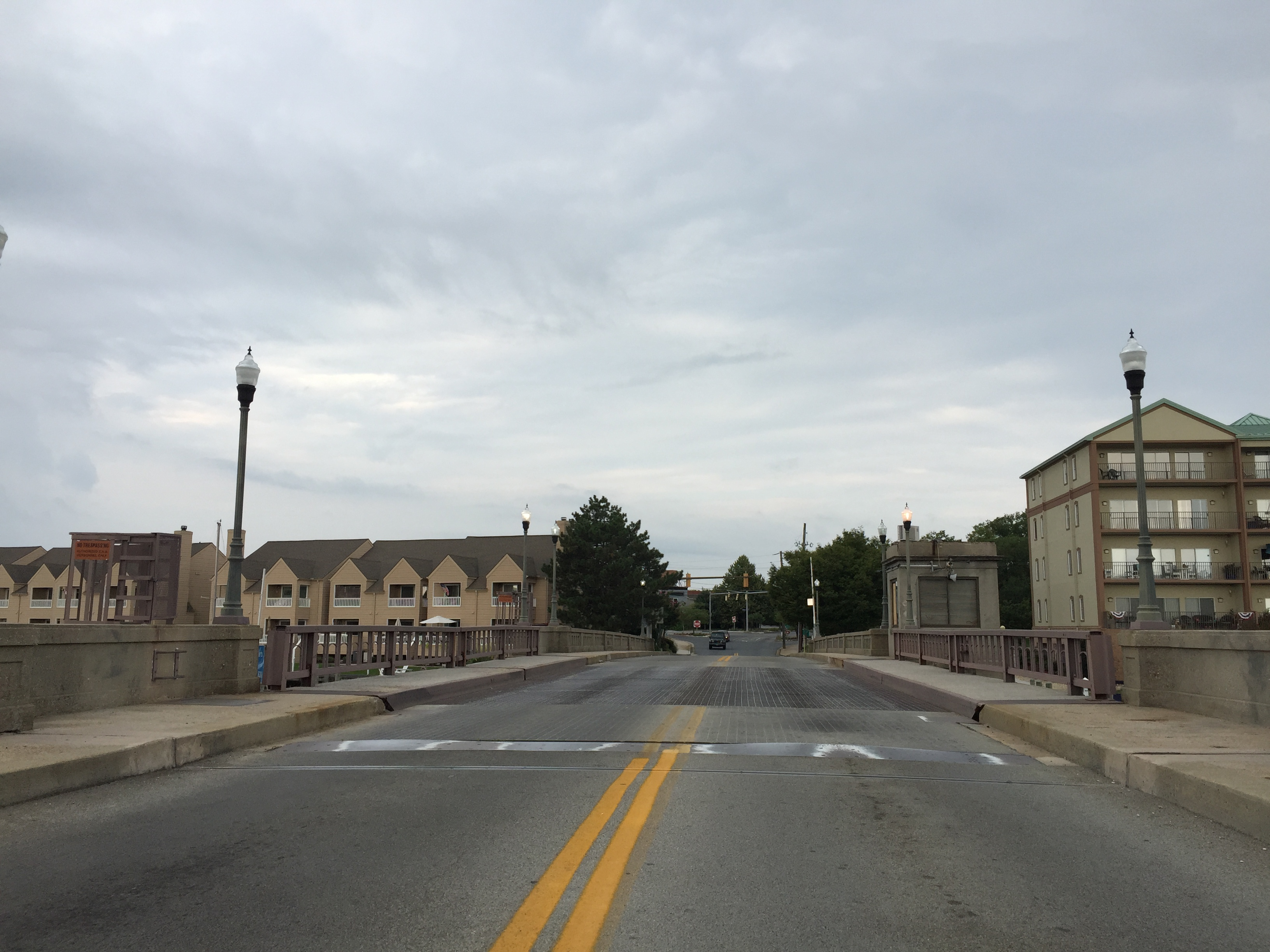
MD 795 in Cambridge, Dorchester County

Maryland Route 795 is the unsigned designation for two separate portions of highway, one in Baltimore County and one in Dorchester County.

- In Baltimore County, MD 795 is an unnamed 0.47-mile (0.76 km) connector from the intersection of MD 140 and ramps to and from I-795 in the direction of Baltimore north to the intersection of MD 30 and MD 128 within Reisterstown.
- In Dorchester County, MD 795 is the 0.07-mile (0.11 km) portion of Maryland Avenue on the drawbridge over Cambridge Creek in downtown Cambridge.

Browse numbered routes
← I-795	→ MD 796

== MD 796 ==
Maryland Route 796
- Location: Anne Arundel County
- Length: 0.05 mi (80 m)

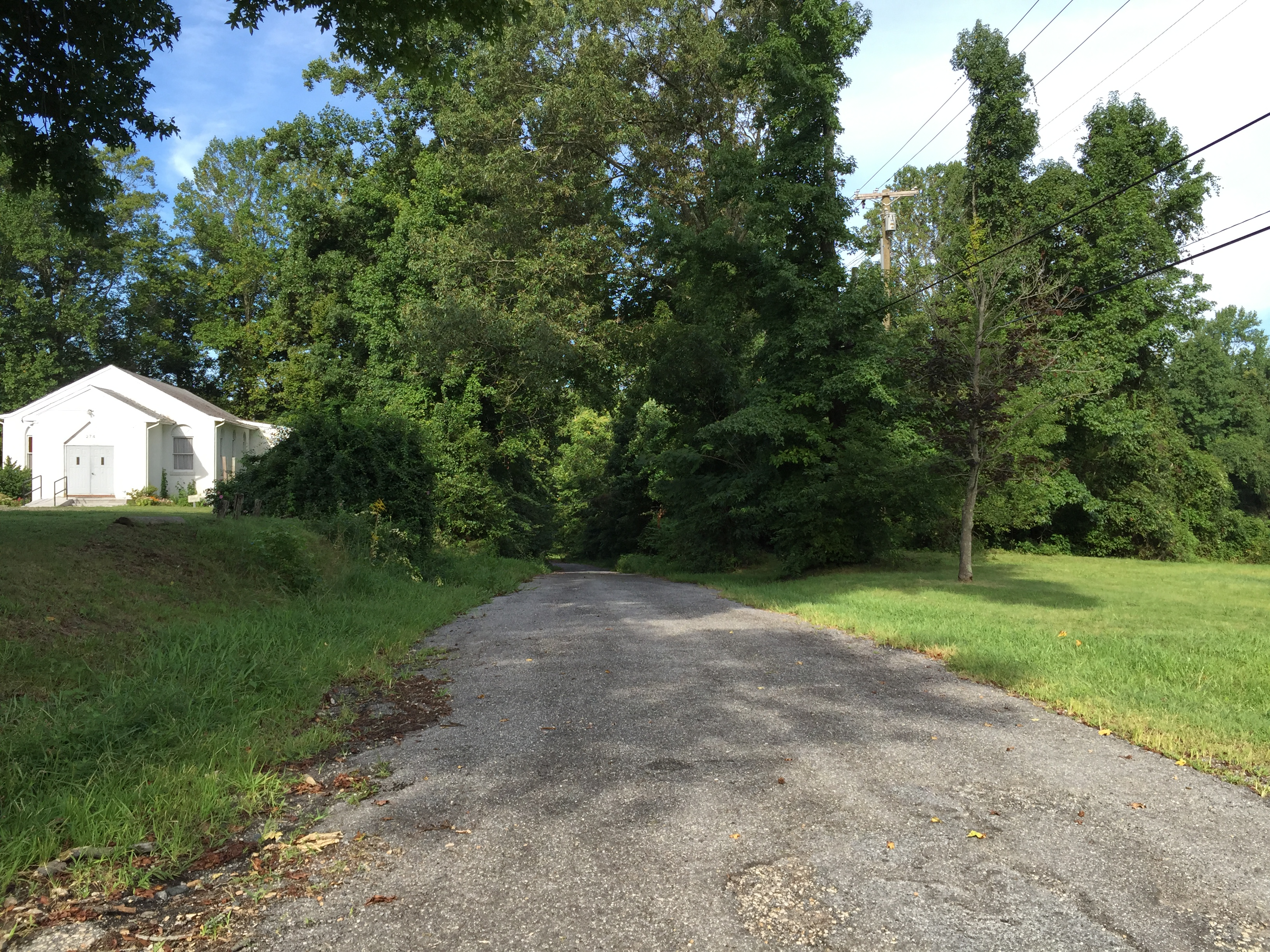
View west along MD 796A at MD 258 in Anne Arundel County

Maryland Route 796 is the unsigned designation for a short unnamed road east of Bristol in Anne Arundel County, running from MD 794 east to a dead end. The route is 0.05 mi (0.080 km) long.

- MD 796A is the unsigned designation for an unnamed loop off of MD 258 in Lothian, Anne Arundel County. The route is 0.29 mi (0.47 km) long.

Browse numbered routes
← MD 795	→ MD 797

== MD 797 ==
Maryland Route 797
- Location: Annapolis
- Length: 0.27 mi (430 m)

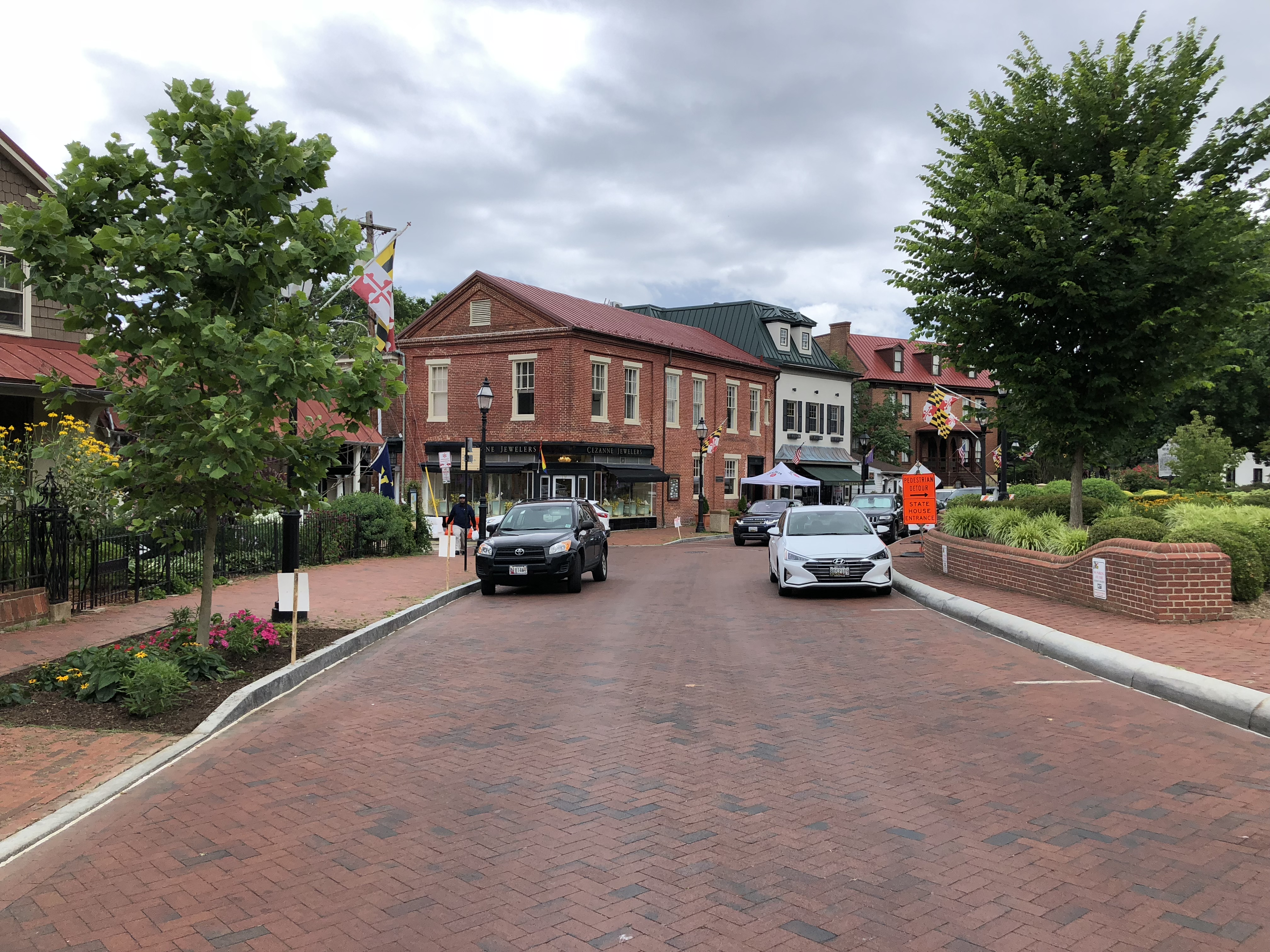
View along MD 797, which follows State Circle in Annapolis

Maryland Route 797 is the unsigned designation for State Circle, the traffic circle that encircles the Maryland State House in Annapolis. The street is also the location of the governor's residence. MD 797 is surfaced entirely in brick and has a circumference of 0.27 miles (0.43 km). The circle officially begins and ends at Maryland Avenue.

Browse numbered routes
← MD 796	→ MD 798

== MD 798 ==
Maryland Route 798
- Location: Crownsville
- Length: 0.34 mi (550 m)

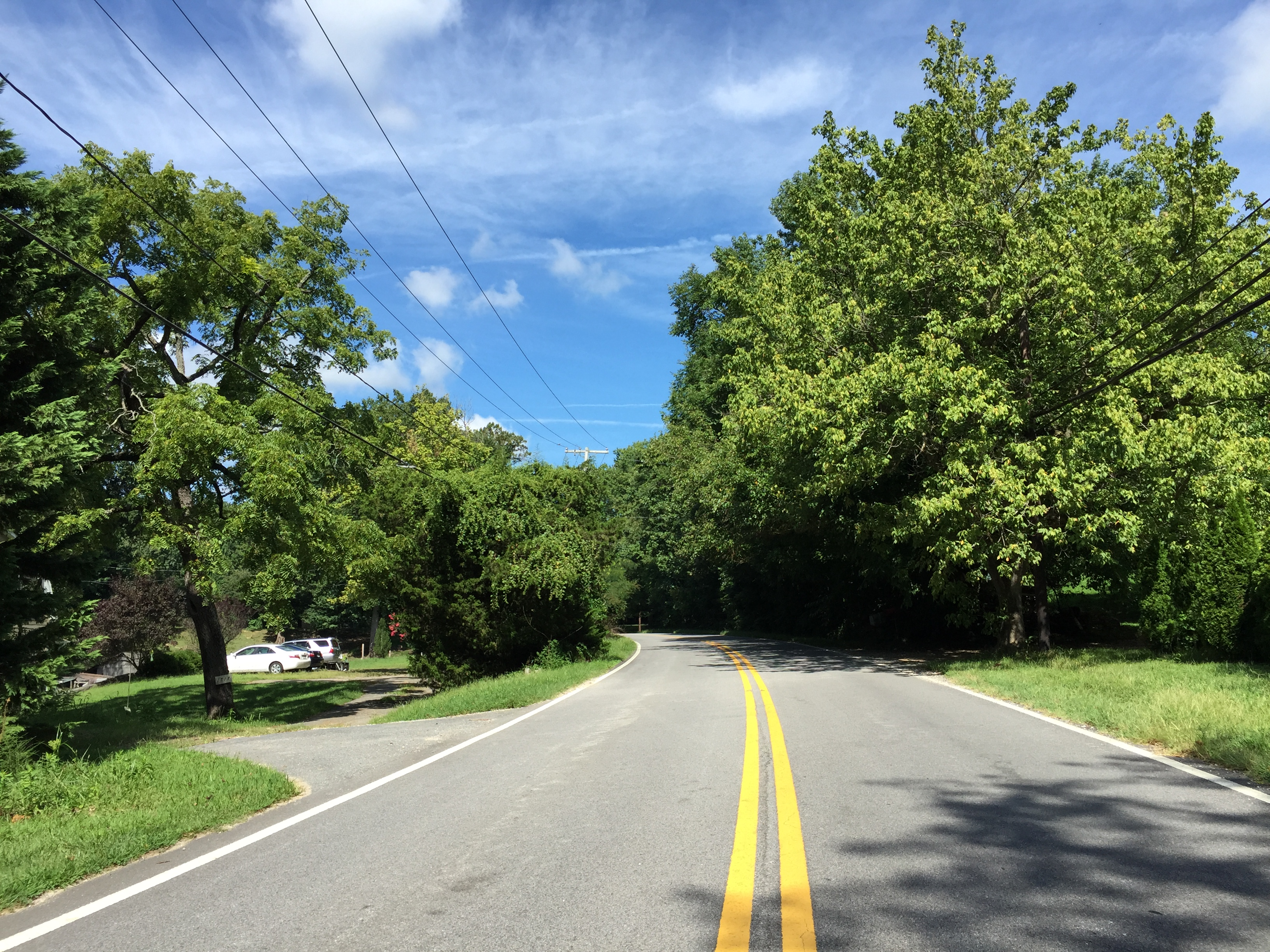
View west along MD 798 in Crownsville

Maryland Route 798 is the unsigned designation for a 0.34-mile (0.55 km) section of Old Generals Highway, a section of the old alignment of MD 178, from Sherwood Forest Road to MD 178 in Crownsville.

Browse numbered routes
← MD 797	→ MD 800
