= Benevola, Maryland =

Unincorporated community in Maryland, U.S.

Coordinates: 39°32′44″N 77°40′34″W

Benevola is an unincorporated community in Washington County, Maryland, United States.
