= Maryland Route 508 =

State highway in Maryland, United States

Maryland Route 508
- Adelina Road

Route information
- Maintained by MDSHA
- Length: 1.20 mi (1.93 km)
- Existed: 1933–present

Major junctions
- South end: MD 506 at Bowens
- North end: MD 231 near Barstow

Location
- Country: United States
- State: Maryland
- Counties: Calvert

Highway system
- Maryland highway system; Interstate; US; State; Scenic Byways
← MD 506	→ MD 509

Maryland Route 508 (MD 508) is a state highway in the U.S. state of Maryland. Known as Adelina Road, the state highway runs 1.20 miles (1.93 km) from MD 506 in Bowens north to MD 231 near Barstow. MD 508 was constructed in the early 1930s from MD 231 to Adelina. The southern terminus was rolled back to Bowens in the late 1950s.

== Route description ==
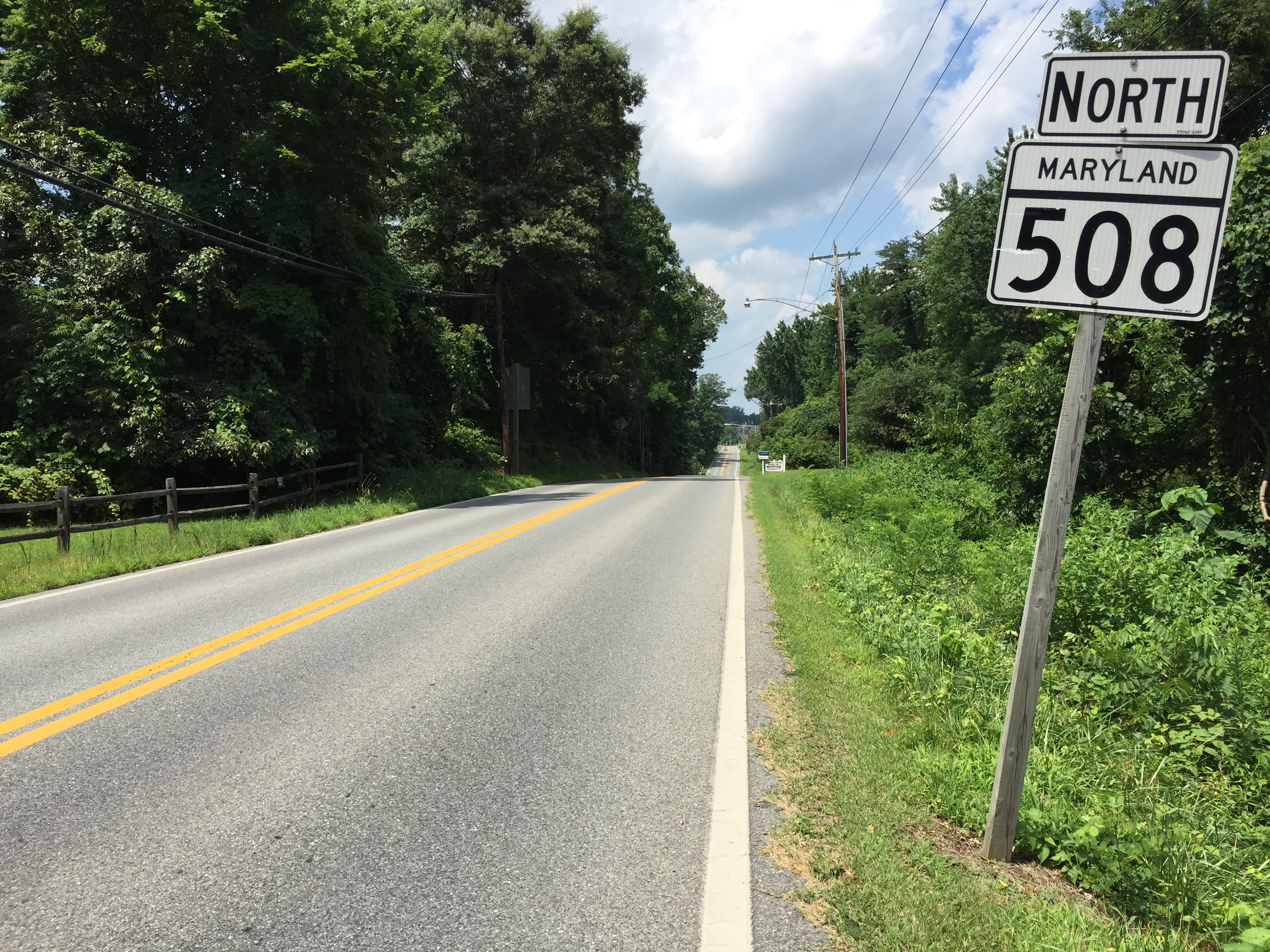
View north from the south end of MD 508 at MD 506 in Bowens

MD 508 begins at a four-way intersection in Bowens. Sixes Road heads east as MD 506 toward Port Republic and west as a county highway toward the Patuxent River. Adelina Road continues south as a county highway toward the unincorporated community of Adelina and the historic home Taney Place, which was the birthplace of Supreme Court Chief Justice Roger Taney. MD 508 heads north as a two-lane undivided road through a forested area with scattered residences. The state highway reaches its northern terminus at MD 231 (Hallowing Point Road) near Barstow.

== History ==
MD 508 was constructed from MD 231 south to Sheridan Point Road in Adelina in 1933. The southern terminus was rolled back to MD 506 in Bowens in 1957.

== Junction list ==
The entire route is in Calvert County.

Location	mi	km	Destinations	Notes
Bowens	0.00	0.00	MD 506 east (Sixes Road) / Sixes Road west / Adelina Road south – Adelina, Port Republic	Southern terminus; western terminus of MD 506
Barstow	1.20	1.93	MD 231 (Hallowing Point Road) – Prince Frederick, Hughesville	Northern terminus
1.000 mi = 1.609 km; 1.000 km = 0.621 mi
