= 2002 La Plata tornado =

Tornado in Charles County, Maryland, US

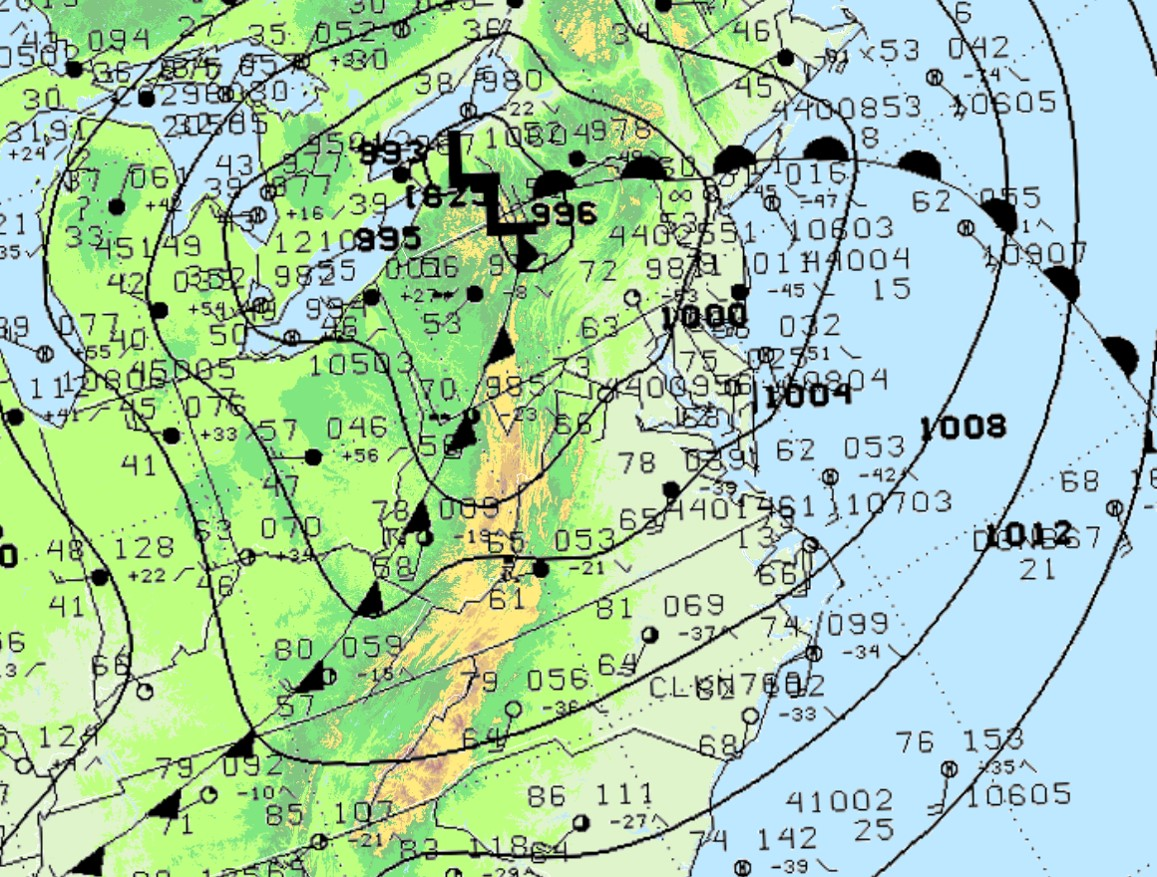
- Top: The tornado as it was tracking through La Plata.; Bottom: A surface analysis 3 hours (21:00 UTC) before the tornado passed through Maryland.

Meteorological history
- Formed: April 28, 2002, 6:56 p.m. EDT (UTC−04:00)
- Dissipated: April 28, 2002, 8:26 p.m. EDT (UTC−04:00)
- Duration: 1 hour, 30 minutes

F4 tornado
- on the Fujita scale

Overall effects
- Fatalities: 3 (+2 indirect)
- Injuries: 122
- Damage: $115 million (2002 USD)
- Areas affected: Charles County, Calvert County, Dorchester County, and Wicomico County
- Part of the tornado outbreak of April 27–28, 2002 and Tornadoes of 2002

The 2002 La Plata tornado (/ləˈpleɪtə/ lə-PLAY-tə) was an extremely powerful and fast-moving multi-vortex tornado that devastated the town of La Plata, Maryland, killing 3 people and injuring 122 others. It was the costliest tornado of the tornado outbreak of April 27–28, 2002, causing at least $115 million in damages. It is also one of the worst storms to affect the greater Baltimore-Washington D.C. area.

At approximately 6:56 pm (EST), the tornado touched down south of Marbury in western Charles County, Maryland. It struck La Plata shortly after and killed one person when their house was swept away. After entering Calvert County, two more people died when their home was picked up and thrown. It then continued into the Chesapeake Bay, barely missing the Calvert Cliffs Nuclear Power Plant to its south. After crossing the bay, the tornado moved into Dorchester County, strengthening to F3 intensity before dissipating west of Salisbury, Maryland.

The tornado had one of the fastest-anticipated forward speeds on record for a violent tornado. Only six other F4-rated tornadoes have occurred farther north and east, with none of them traveling as far. It is also the most recent violent tornado to strike the Mid-Atlantic and Northeast regions. (Note: A rating of F4/EF4 or greater on the Fujita scale and Enhanced Fujita scale respectively is classified as a violent tornado.)

== Meteorological synopsis ==
Top: Reflectivity radar recap of the supercell that spawned the tornado. Bottom: Velocity radar recap of the supercell.

On the afternoon of April 28th, a supercell developed in central West Virginia and traveled across the Appalachian Mountains. The system then became tornadic near Quicksburg, Virginia. Several tornado warnings were issued for both Rockingham and Shenandoah county. A tornado then passed near Mount Jackson, Virginia where F2 damage occurred.

Between 6:10 and 6:20 p.m. (EST), a forecaster called the Charles County "9-1-1 Operations Center" noting a tornadic thunderstorm heading their way. As the supercell neared the Potomac, radar indicated weakening and the disappearance of a hook echo occurred. With no confirmation of a tornado and signs that the tornadic potential was waning, forecasters issued a severe thunderstorm warning for Charles and Calvert Counties at 6:45 pm. Within this warning, a call-to-action statement mentioned the possibility of tornadoes.

At 6:56 p.m., the tornado touched down near Marbury. It then struck the community of Ripley shortly after, where F2 damage occurred. Around this time, a forecaster attempted to contact Charles County officials in La Plata about the detection of the tornado on radar. However it took several attempts due to phone lines being clogged with damage reports from Ripley and other communities struck. Roughly six minutes after touchdown, tornado warnings were issued for both Charles and Calvert Counties.

When the warnings were issued, the Emergency Alert System activation process encountered issues. At least 53 percent of the radio stations within the La Plata listening area faced an outage or another problem that prevented them from receiving the alert. Around this same time, eyewitness accounts and damage reports indicated that a second tornado also formed one-quarter of a mile south of the primary one. Between 7:02 and 7:07 p.m., both of the tornadoes passed through downtown La Plata with little warning, devastating the town. As the primary tornado continued eastward through Charles County, the secondary tornado dissipated after reaching F2 intensity.

After striking the town of Benedict, the tornado crossed the Patuxent and into Calvert County at approximately 7:28 pm. Although weakened, widespread F1 to F2 damage still occurred. It then moved offshore into the Chesapeake Bay around 7:45 p.m., narrowly missing the Calvert Cliffs Nuclear Power Plant to its south. While crossing the Chesapeake, a second satellite tornado joined it for most of its journey.

After traversing across the entire Bay, it entered Dorchester County shortly before 8:00 pm. It then intensified back to F3 strength before dissipating west of Salisbury, Maryland. Only two other tornadoes have reached F3/EF3 intensity along the Delmarva Peninsula. One in June of 1944, and another in April of 2023 respectively.

This tornado, lasting an unusual 1 hour and 30 minutes, producing a 78-mile trail of devastation through southeast Maryland. This makes it one of the longest lasting and farthest traveling tornadoes outside tornado alley. Since records began in 1950, only one other violent tornado has been documented in the state, occurring in 1998. This tornado also had an incredibly fast average forward speed of 52 mph (84 km/h), making it one of the fastest violent tornadoes on record.

== Impact ==
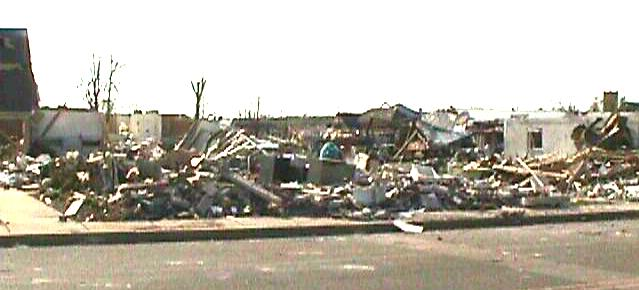
A completely leveled brand-new orthodontist office, originally rated F5.

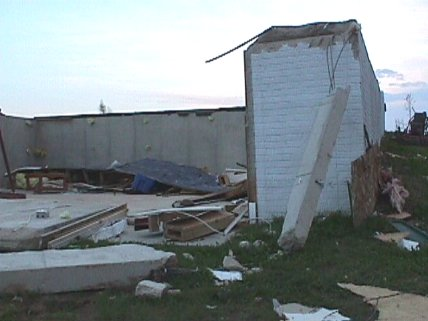
Back view of an anchored house swept off its foundation, rated high-end F3 to F4.

As the tornado traversed through the counties Charles, Calvert, Dorchester and Wicomico, many forest and towns were left in ruins. In La Plata, the structural damage was catastrophic. Approximately 65 percent of the entire downtown sustained heavy damage or complete destruction. In total, the tornado killed 5 people and injured some 122 others. It also inflicted $115 million in damage, making it the costliest Mid-Atlantic tornado on record.

After touching down, the tornado produced F1 damage near Pisgah. F2 damage then occurred in Ripley, where homes were unroofed. F3 damage then occurred along Hill Spring Road, roughly 1.5 miles (2.4 km) west of La Plata. The tornado then struck Morgans Ridge Road, where several houses were swept clean off their foundation. Around this time, tornado warnings were first issued.

F3 damage continued into West Quail Lane where several homes were obliterated. The tornado then entered downtown La Plata, striking the Archbishop Neale School where heavy cement slabs forming the roof were picked up and thrown into classrooms. Several walls were also "torn away". As the tornado progressed into La Plata, it strengthened and expanded to a width of nearly half a mile (0.8 km). Intense swaths of F3 and F4 damage then began to occur throughout town. These swaths and eyewitness reports also indicate that the tornado was multi-vortex. Along Route 6, vehicles were lifted and thrown, while the 125-foot city steel water tower was twisted and toppled. At the Posies Market nearby, only a few walls were left standing. East of the La Plata shopping center where a CVS Pharmacy was destroyed, a KFC was leveled. Next to this, a historical town sign and its concrete foundation were pulled out of the ground. Entire utility poles were also snapped and thrown. Along Saint Marys Avenue, a brick and steel lumber yard building was demolished. "Heavy F4 damage" occurred just east of this. A brand new brick orthodontist office was completely obliterated after taking a direct hit. Two multistory homes sustained F4 damage next to the railroad tracks where there "was little to nothing left" of them and their respective garages.

While traversing through La Plata, the tornado was moving unusually fast at nearly a mile per minute (58 mph (93 km/h)). This led to much of its destruction occurring in a matter of seconds. After exiting downtown La Plata, extensive tree damage was documented before it struck the Clark Run subdivision where three more homes were swept away. Within one of these homes, seven people that were inside all miraculously managed to survive. Three individuals were in the basement, two were on the first floor, and the remaining two were on the second floor. Several other homes had their walls and roofs blown down throughout this area. A 51-year-old man was killed, and his wife was critically injured when the tornado flattened their under-construction home on Hawkins Gate Road. Another house nearby was rated high-end F3 to F4 after it was swept of its foundation.

As the tornado continued eastward, numerous rural homes and barns were destroyed. F3 damage occurred along Dusty Miller and Pale Morning Road. F2 damage occurred as the tornado crossed MD 5. Just west of Benedict on MD 231, several homes sustained F3 damage. In total across Charles County, 638 homes were damaged while 100 others were completely destroyed. A total of 143 business (mainly in downtown La Plata) were also damaged, with 49 others being destroyed.

As the tornado entered Calvert County south of the Patuxent River Bridge, it struck a development of homes. Over half of them were damaged. Several homes were also destroyed. Along Hallowing Point Road, a home with no anchoring or foundation was picked up and thrown 80 ft (24 m) into a culvert, killing an elderly couple. Many other homes also lost their walls and roofs in western Calvert County. The tornado continued south of Prince Frederick before passing just north of the Calvert Cliffs Nuclear Power Plant where several large trees were leveled. Tornado damage in Calvert was rated at F1 to F2 intensity. At least 125 homes were damaged, with another 10 being destroyed.

After crossing the Chesapeake Bay, the tornado struck Robinson Neck where F1 damage occurred. It then continued southwestward into Hip Roof Road at F3 intensity where several outbuildings and a home was destroyed. Shortly thereafter, it crossed into Wicomico County where several homes in Royal Oak sustained F1 damage. It then dissipated just south of Quantico some miles west of Salisbury. Over 60 mi (97 km) away in southern Delaware, debris such as canceled checks, bank documents, tax documents, and teller receipts from La Plata were discovered.

=== Preliminary F5 rating ===
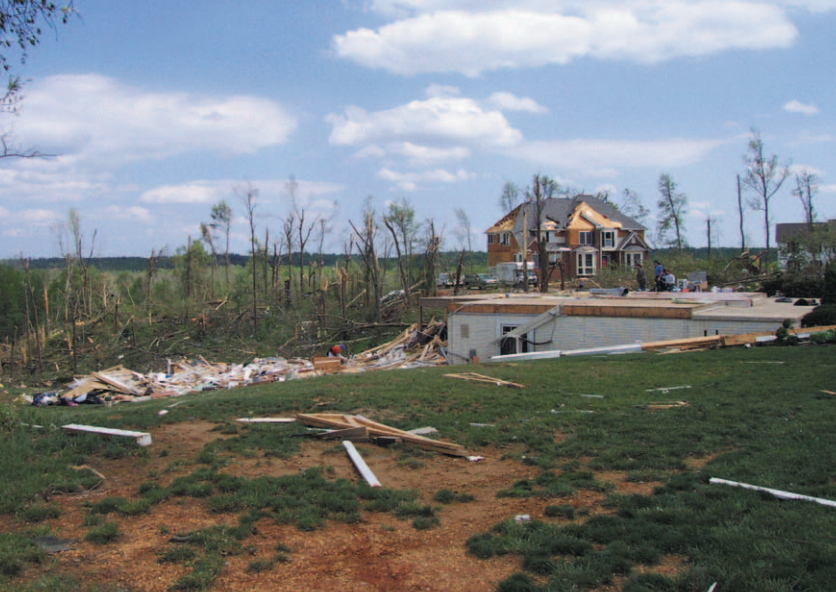
Side view of an anchor-bolted house swept clean off its foundation, rated F2.

The La Plata tornado was initially rated F5, but was downgraded during a later damage survey. For a brief period of time, this made it the easternmost F5 tornado in the United States. This preliminary F5 rating, partly due to damage from a brick building in downtown La Plata, was lowered to F4 after the damage assessment team determined the destruction was enhanced by flying debris from the nearby lumber yard. The damage to homes initially rated F5 were lowered when engineer Timothy Marshall surveyed and determined they were not properly anchored. This caused them to be swept off their foundations by lesser winds. While impressive, team members agreed that the tornado damage was not as intense as other F5-rated tornadoes such as 1990 Plainfield, 1991 Andover, 1997 Jarrell, and 1999 Bridge Creek-Moore.

Many of the "slider homes" swept off their foundation were rated F1 to F3, with surveyors having to rely solely on the severity of the surrounding damage to determine ratings. This includes the toppled steel water tower in La Plata, which "was impressive, but occurred in an area of F1 damage". This event highlighted key limitations of the Fujita scale and is largely responsible for how tornadoes are surveyed today.

=== Rarity ===
While violent tornadoes are already extraordinarily rare within the Mid-Atlantic, the exceptional duration and long path of this tornado is particularly remarkable for being so far outside the climatologically favored area. Despite the rarity of such an event, this is not the deadliest tornado to have struck La Plata. On November 9, 1926, another F4 tornado carved a 24 mi (39 km) path through Charles and Calvert Counties, killing 13 school children, 4 townspeople, and injuring some 35-65 others.

== Aftermath ==
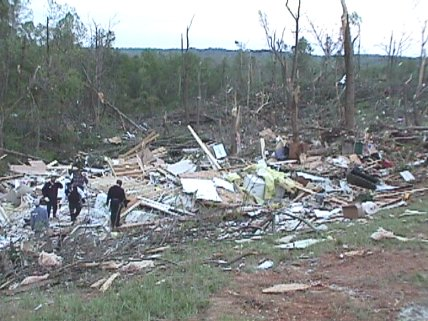
Law enforcement searching through debris of a house swept clean off its foundation.

In the wake of the tornado, Gov. Parris N. Glendening declared a state of emergency in Charles, Calvert and Dorchester County. Schools and offices were also closed. The Red Cross helped place several families in nearby hotels. Just two days later, over 90% of the debris in downtown La Plata was cleared from the roads. This restored traffic access to the area. Amid nationwide media coverage of the event, damage surveys were done by the Federal Emergency Management Agency's, Building Performance Assessment Team, and Wind Engineering Research Council during the same time NWS conducted theirs

Due to this event, the town of La Plata installed multiple tornado sirens in and around the community to enhance preparedness for future storms. A memorial garden was also established in La Plata featuring benches that commemorate the victims of both the 1926 and 2002 tornadoes. This event is also largely responsible for the modern use of the Enhanced Fujita scale.

== See also ==
- List of Maryland Tornadoes
- List of North American tornadoes
- List of F4, EF4, and IF4 tornadoes
  - List of F4 and EF4 tornadoes (2000–2009)
- Tornado outbreak of June 2, 1998
- Tornado outbreak of September 24, 2001
