= Maryland Route 506 =

State highway in Maryland, United States

Maryland Route 506
- Sixes Road

Route information
- Maintained by MDSHA
- Length: 3.79 mi (6.10 km)
- Existed: 1933–present
- Tourist routes: Star-Spangled Banner Scenic Byway

Major junctions
- West end: MD 508 at Bowens
- East end: MD 2 / MD 4 near Port Republic

Location
- Country: United States
- State: Maryland
- Counties: Calvert

Highway system
- Maryland highway system; Interstate; US; State; Scenic Byways
← MD 501	→ MD 508

Maryland Route 506 (MD 506) is a state highway in the U.S. state of Maryland. Known as Sixes Road, the state highway runs 3.79 miles (6.10 km) from MD 508 in Bowens east to MD 2/MD 4 near Port Republic. MD 506 provides access to Battle Creek Cypress Swamp. The state highway was constructed from MD 2 to the swamp in the early 1930s and extended to Bowens in the late 1950s.

== Route description ==
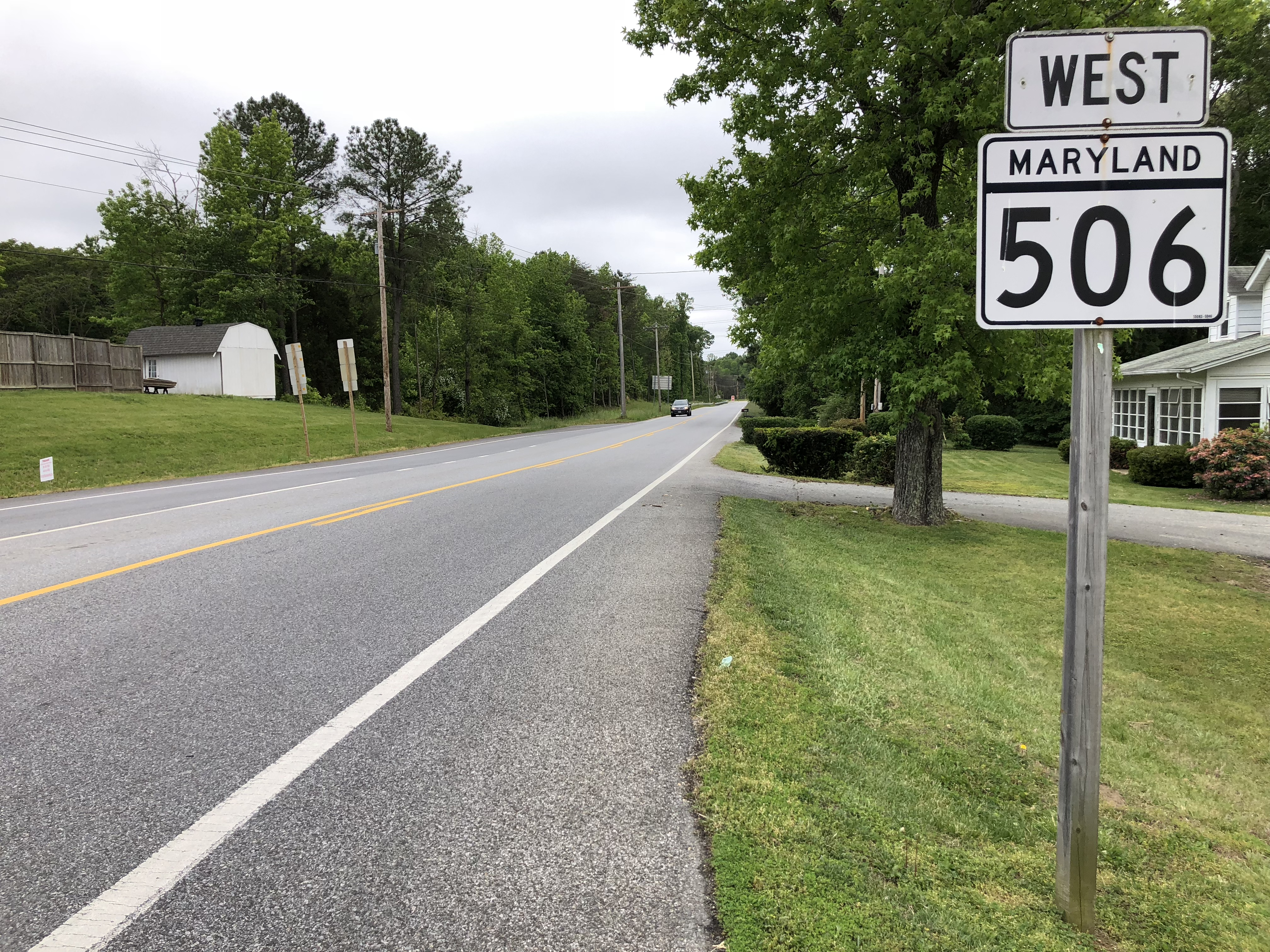
View west from the east end of MD 506 at MD 2/MD 4 near Port Republic

MD 506 begins at a four-way intersection in Bowens. Adelina Road heads north as MD 508 toward Barstow and south as a county highway toward Adelina. Sixes Road continues west as a county highway toward the Patuxent River. MD 506 heads east as a two-lane undivided road that passes through a forested area with scattered residences. The state highway crosses Battle Creek, which flows through the Battle Creek Cypress Swamp Sanctuary. The sanctuary is a National Natural Landmark maintained by The Nature Conservancy that contains the only stands of bald cypress on the Western Shore of Maryland. The sanctuary visitor center is located on Grays Road, which intersects MD 506 just east of Battle Creek. From the swamp, MD 506 veers northeast toward its eastern terminus at MD 2/MD 4, which run concurrently as Solomons Island Road, near Port Republic.

== History ==
MD 506 was constructed from MD 2 west to Grays Road by 1933. The state highway was extended to MD 508 in 1957.

== Junction list ==
The entire route is in Calvert County.

Location	mi	km	Destinations	Notes
Bowens	0.00	0.00	MD 508 north (Adelina Road) / Adelina Road south / Sixes Road west – Adelina, Barstow	Western terminus; southern terminus of MD 508
Port Republic	3.79	6.10	MD 2 / MD 4 (Solomons Island Road) – Prince Frederick, Solomons	Eastern terminus
1.000 mi = 1.609 km; 1.000 km = 0.621 mi
