= Maryland Route 231 =

State highway in Maryland, USA

Maryland Route 231
- Map of Southern Maryland with MD 231 highlighted in red

Route information
- Maintained by MDSHA
- Length: 16.39 mi (26.38 km)
- Existed: 1927–present
- Tourist routes: Star-Spangled Banner Scenic Byway

Major junctions
- West end: Olivers Shop Road near Hughesville
- MD 5 in Hughesville; MD 381 in Patuxent; MD 508 near Barstow; MD 2 / MD 4 in Prince Frederick
- East end: MD 765 in Prince Frederick

Location
- Country: United States
- State: Maryland
- Counties: Charles, Calvert

Highway system
- Maryland highway system; Interstate; US; State; Scenic Byways
← MD 229	→ MD 234

Maryland Route 231 (MD 231) is a state highway in the U.S. state of Maryland. The state highway runs 16.39 miles (26.38 km) from Olivers Shop Road near Hughesville east to MD 765 in Prince Frederick. MD 231 crosses the Patuxent River on the Benedict Bridge, which connects Benedict in eastern Charles County with Hallowing Point in central Calvert County. The highway directly connects MD 5 in Hughesville with MD 2/MD 4 in Prince Frederick. MD 231 was constructed from Hughesville to Benedict and from Hollowing Point to Prince Frederick in the early 1920s. The portion of the state highway west of Hughesville was built in the early 1930s, about the same time ferry service began between Benedict and Hallowing Point. The Benedict Bridge was started in 1950 and was completed in 1952; the bridge remained the southernmost crossing of the Patuxent River for 25 years. The bridge was tolled from its opening until around 1955. MD 231 was reconstructed between Hughesville and Prince Frederick in the mid- to late 1950s to better serve intercounty traffic.

== Route description ==
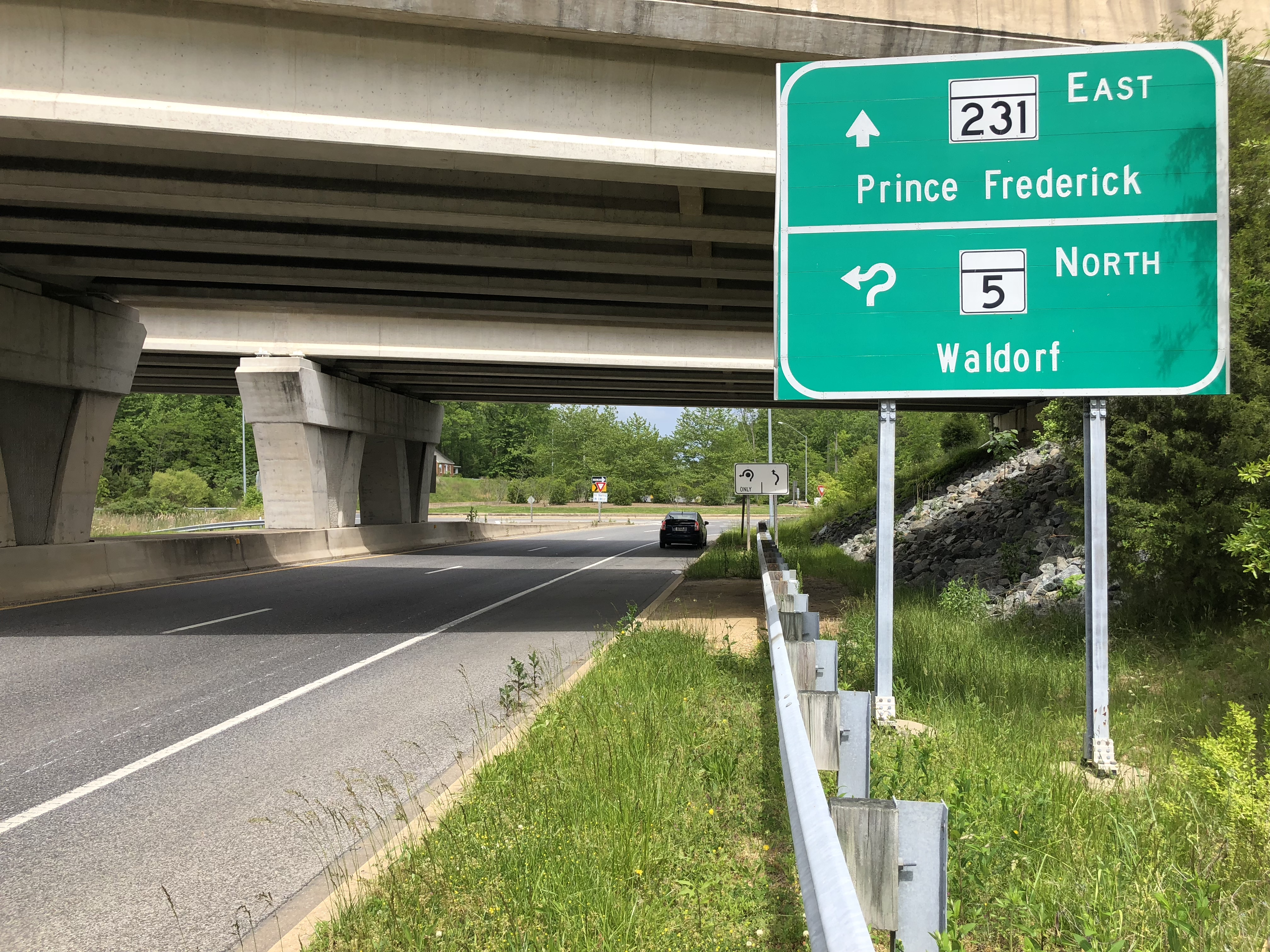
MD 231 eastbound at MD 5 in Hughesville

MD 231 begins at an intersection with Olivers Shop Road in the hamlet of Burnt Store in eastern Charles County. Olivers Shop Road connects Dentsville to the south with Bryantown to the north. MD 231 heads east as two-lane undivided Burnt Store Road, crossing Gilbert Creek on its way to Hughesville. Within Hughesville, the state highway intersects MD 5 Business (Old Leonardtown Road), where the highway's name changes to Prince Frederick Road. East of the village center, MD 231 meets MD 5 (Leonardtown Road) at a dumbbell interchange. In the hamlet of Patuxent, the state highway intersects the southern terminus of MD 381 (Brandywine Road), which heads north into the southeastern corner of Prince George's County.

From Patuxent, MD 231 heads southeast through the neck of far eastern Charles County that reaches to the Patuxent River between Prince George's County and St. Mary's County. Before reaching the river, the state highway passes to the north of the village of Benedict, which was the site of the landing of British troops to march toward Washington, D.C., prior to the Battle of Bladensburg during the War of 1812. The state highway crosses the Patuxent River on the Benedict Bridge, a 3,343-foot (1,019 m) long steel beam bridge whose roadway is 24 feet (7.3 m) wide. At the Patuxent River's navigation channel, the bridge features a through steel girder swing span that has 17 feet (5.2 m) vertical clearance when closed and provides two openings with 50 feet (15 m) horizontal clearance when opened.

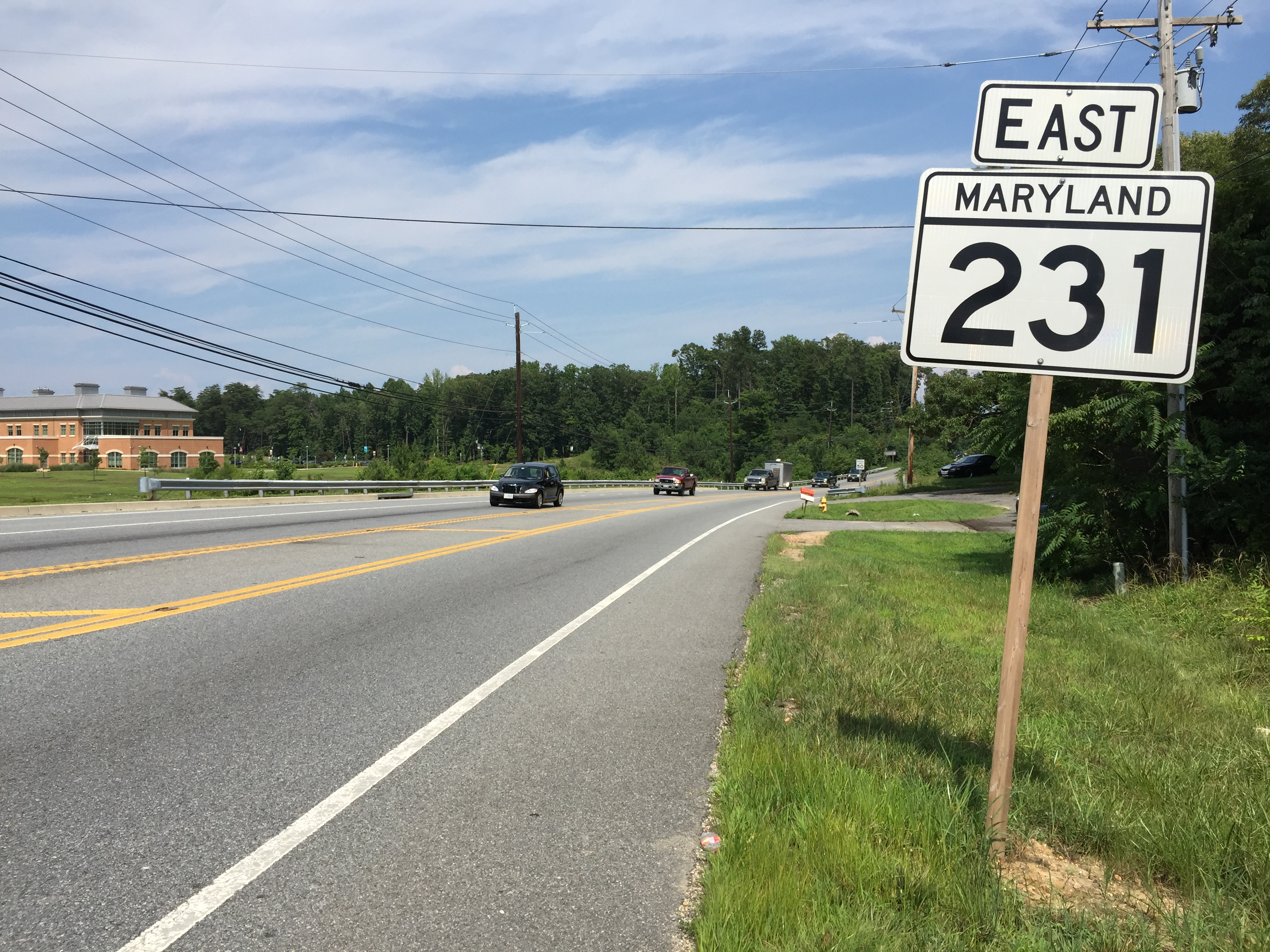
View east along MD 231 in Barstow

MD 231 enters Calvert County at Hallowing Point and continues east as Hallowing Point Road, passing an industrial park and Hallowing Point Park. After intersecting the northern terminus of MD 508 (Adelina Road), the state highway veers northeast through the village of Barstow, where the highway passes west of a park and ride lot and the Calvert County Fairgrounds before it intersects Barstow Road, which serves the historic homes Cedar Hill and Willow Glenn. MD 231 passes south of the Prince Frederick campus of the College of Southern Maryland before entering Prince Frederick. The state highway meets MD 2/MD 4, which run concurrently as Solomons Island Road, on the west side of the county seat. MD 231 continues northeast as Church Street, passing the historic home Linden, home of the Calvert County Historical Society. The state highway reaches its eastern terminus at MD 765 (Main Street), a short distance north of the county courthouse.

MD 231 is a part of the main National Highway System from MD 5 in Hughesville to MD 2/MD 4 in Prince Frederick.

== History ==
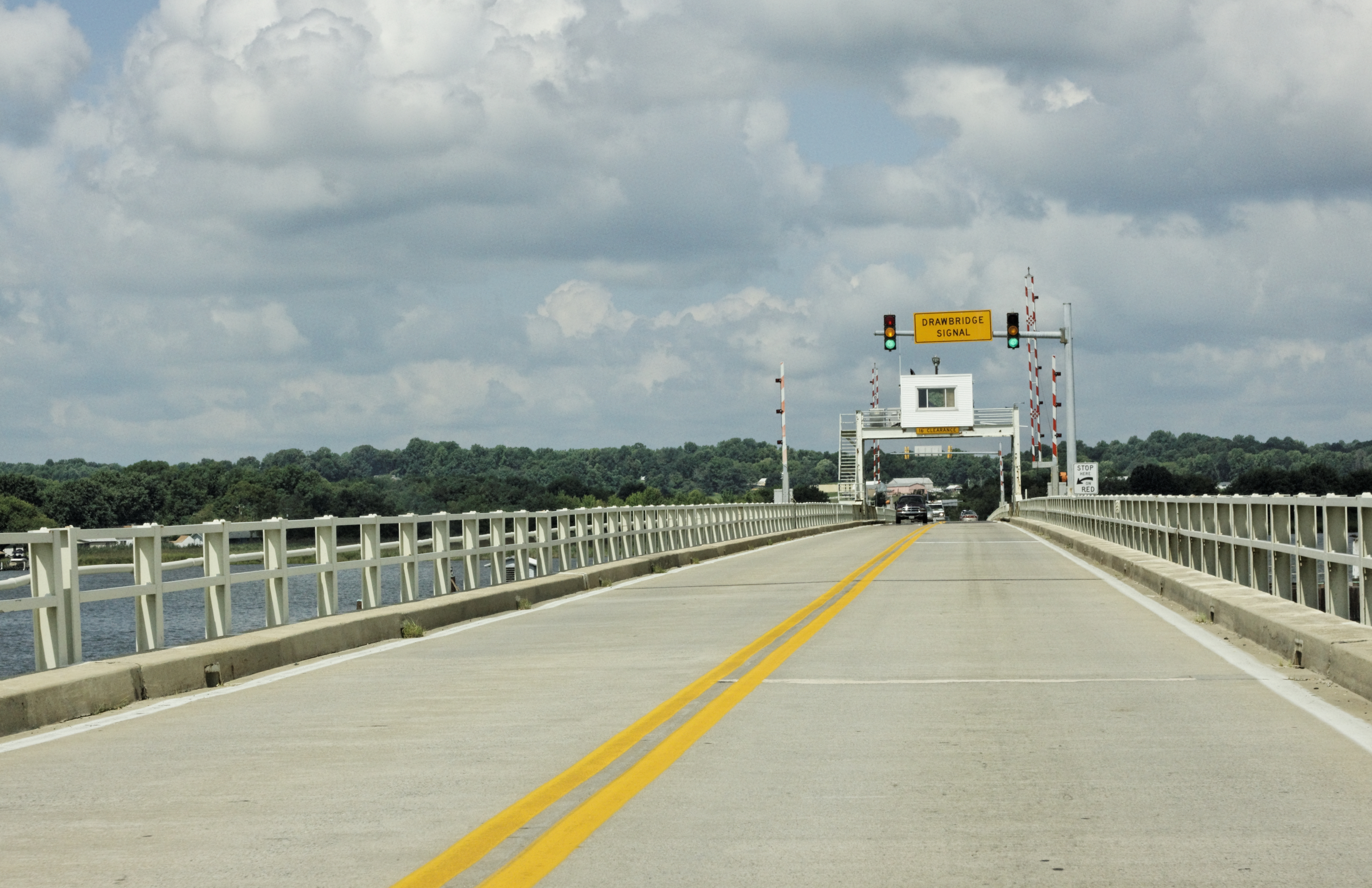
Westbound on the Benedict Bridge over the Patuxent River looking toward Benedict

The Prince Frederick Road portion of MD 231, originally named Benedict Road, was constructed as a gravel road by 1921. The Hallowing Point Road section was built in gravel around 1923. Burnt Store Road was constructed of gravel starting in 1930 and was completed by 1933. At MD 231's western terminus, Olivers Shop Road was originally MD 232, which ran from MD 234 at Wicomico north to what was then MD 233 (Woodville Road) north of Bryantown. MD 232 was removed from the state highway system around 1989, leaving MD 231's western terminus at a county highway.

Ferry service began between Benedict and Hallowing Point began around 1933. On the west side of the Patuxent River, MD 231 originally turned south into the village of Benedict, following Benedict Avenue to the ferry terminal where the avenue starting following the riverbank. The Hallowing Point terminal remains today as a boat ramp immediately south of the bridge. State senator Louis L. Goldstein of Calvert County sponsored a bill to construct a bridge between Benedict and Hallowing Point. In order to get enough votes to pass, the bridge bill stipulated the bridge would have a 25-cent toll. Work on the Benedict Bridge began in May 1950. The toll plaza and administration building were completed on the Calvert County side of the bridge in autumn 1951. The bridge itself and 24-foot (7.3 m) wide gravel approach roads on both sides of the river were completed and opened in spring 1952. The toll was removed from the bridge in 1955 due to very low traffic; a daily average of 237 vehicles used the bridge in its first year. By comparison, the bridge had an average annual daily traffic figure of 12,312 vehicles in 2013.

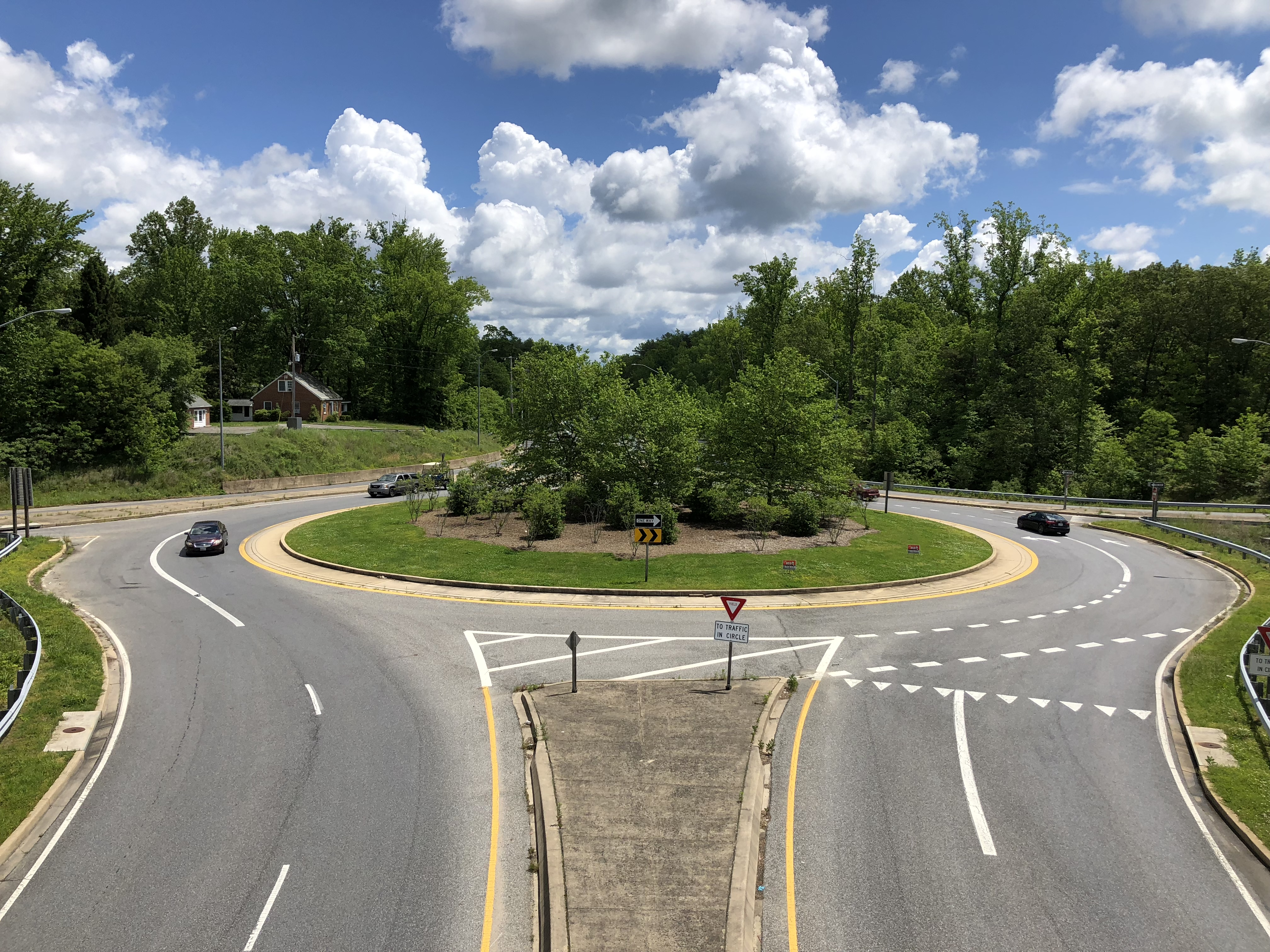
View east along MD 231 from MD 5 in Hughesville

The completion of the Benedict Bridge greatly improved the connection between Calvert County and both Charles and St. Mary's counties. Prior to 1952, the southernmost bridge on the Patuxent River had been Hills Bridge, by which MD 4 crosses the river at Upper Marlboro. By 1953, MD 231 between MD 5 in Hughesville and MD 2 in Prince Frederick was marked as a "main highway" on the state highway map. Reconstruction of MD 231 between MD 5 and MD 2 began in 1954. In both counties, the road was resurfaced in two stages: a first stage of bituminous stabilized gravel and a second stage of bituminous concrete. The reconstruction of MD 231 was completed from Prince Frederick to Hallowing Point in 1956 and from Hughesville to Benedict by 1958. The Benedict Bridge remained the southernmost crossing of the Patuxent River until the opening of the Governor Thomas Johnson Bridge between Solomons at the bottom of Calvert County and California in St. Mary's County in 1978. The "functionally obsolete" bridge underwent major repairs in 2002, during which the bridge was reduced to one lane of traffic in alternating directions.

== Junction list ==
County	Location	mi	km	Destinations	Notes
Charles		0.00	0.00	Olivers Shop Road – Dentsville, Bryantown	Western terminus; former MD 232
Charles	Hughesville	3.40	5.47	MD 5 Bus. (Old Leonardtown Road) – Bryantown, Charlotte Hall	Marked as MD 5 Business but officially MD 625
Charles	Hughesville	3.71	5.97	MD 5 (Leonardtown Road) – Waldorf, Lexington Park	Dumbbell interchange
Charles	Patuxent	5.54	8.92	MD 381 north (Brandywine Road) – Brandywine	Southern terminus of MD 381
Patuxent River		10.20– 10.84	16.42– 17.45	Benedict Bridge	
Calvert	Barstow	13.22	21.28	MD 508 south (Adelina Road) – Bowens	Northern terminus of MD 508
Calvert	Prince Frederick	16.08	25.88	MD 2 / MD 4 (Solomons Island Road) – Annapolis, Washington, Solomons	
Calvert	Prince Frederick	16.39	26.38	MD 765 (Main Street)	Eastern terminus; officially MD 765A
1.000 mi = 1.609 km; 1.000 km = 0.621 mi
