= Maryland Route 402 =

State highway in Maryland, United States

Maryland Route 402
- Maryland Route 402 highlighted in red

Route information
- Maintained by MDSHA
- Length: 4.33 mi (6.97 km)
- Existed: 1932–present

Major junctions
- West end: MD 2 / MD 4 in Prince Frederick
- East end: Chesapeake Avenue in Dares Beach

Location
- Country: United States
- State: Maryland
- Counties: Calvert

Highway system
- Maryland highway system; Interstate; US; State; Scenic Byways
← MD 396	→ MD 404

Maryland Route 402 (MD 402) is a state highway in the U.S. state of Maryland. Known for most of its length as Dares Beach Road, the state highway runs 4.33 miles (6.97 km) from MD 2/MD 4 in Prince Frederick east to Chesapeake Avenue in Dares Beach. MD 402 was mostly constructed in 1932. Both termini have changed multiple times; the state highway settled into its present routing in the late 1950s.

== Route description ==
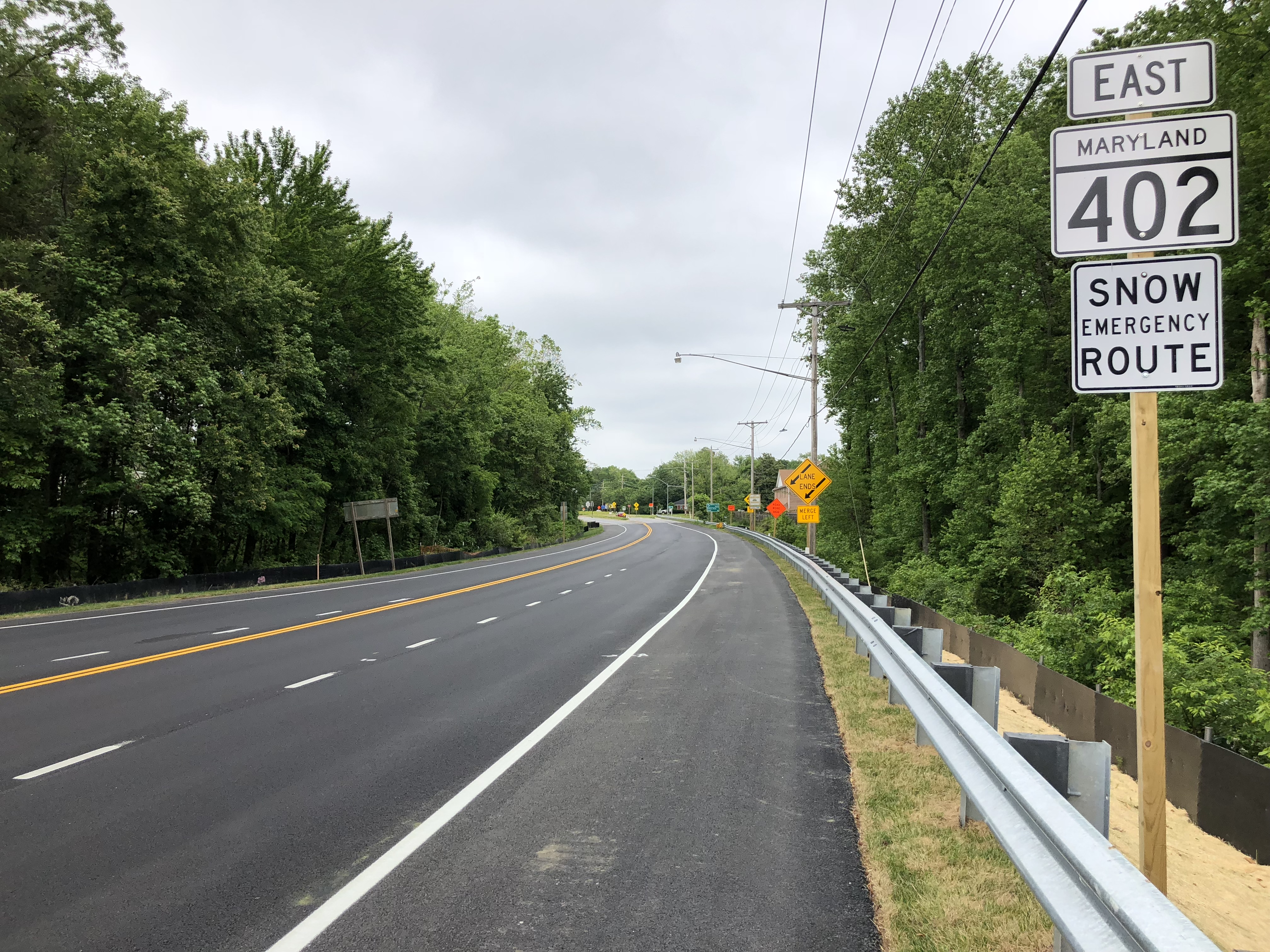
View east along MD 402 in Prince Frederick

MD 402 begins at an intersection with MD 2/MD 4, which run concurrently as Solomons Island Road, in the northern end of Prince Frederick. The roadway continues west as West Dares Beach Road to Prince Frederick Boulevard. MD 402 heads east as two-lane undivided Dares Beach Road, which intersects Armory Road at a roundabout and passes south of Calvert High School. The state highway passes through a forested area with scattered residential subdivisions. Between Prince Frederick and Dares Beach, MD 402 intersects Wilson Road, which heads north toward Plum Point. On the western edge of Dares Beach, the old alignment of MD 402, which is unsigned MD 768 (Dares Wharf Road), splits to the northeast. MD 402 continues east as Branch Street to its eastern terminus at Chesapeake Avenue, one block west of the Chesapeake Bay shoreline.

== History ==
MD 402 was constructed as a gravel road from MD 2 in Prince Frederick, which originally followed Armory Road, to Wilson Road near Dares Beach in 1932. When MD 2 was relocated on the north side of Prince Frederick around 1942, MD 402 was extended south along Armory Road to Main Street (then MD 2, now MD 765). The portion of Armory Road north of MD 402 was designated MD 750. In 1957, the state highway was extended east from Wilson Road to Dares Beach using what is now MD 768. MD 402 was removed from Armory Road the same year when the road was transferred to county control. The state highway was reconstructed with a wider bituminous concrete surface starting in 1957 from the Prince Frederick end. The reconstruction was completed in 1959, the same year the highway was extended to its present western terminus at MD 2. MD 402 was rerouted to its present eastern terminus in 1960.

== Junction list ==
The entire route is in Calvert County.

Location	mi	km	Destinations	Notes
Prince Frederick	0.00	0.00	MD 2 / MD 4 (Solomons Island Road) / West Dares Beach Road – Solomons, Annapolis, Upper Marlboro	Western terminus
Dares Beach	3.85	6.20	MD 768 north (Dares Wharf Road)	
Dares Beach	4.33	6.97	Chesapeake Avenue	Eastern terminus
1.000 mi = 1.609 km; 1.000 km = 0.621 mi
