= CalvertHealth Medical Center =

Coordinates: 38°33′33.27″N 76°35′49.28″W

CalvertHealth
- Calvert Health System
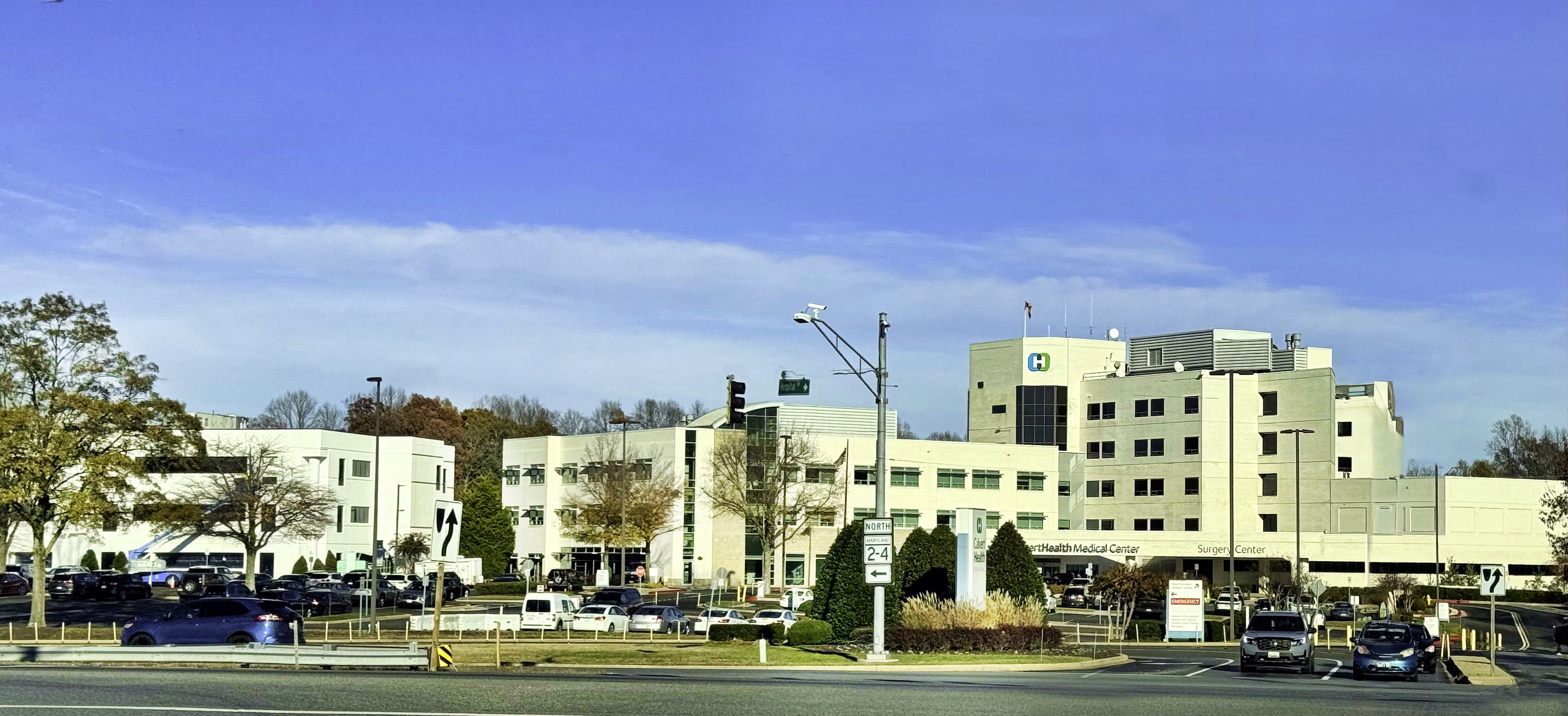

Geography
- Location: Prince Frederick, Maryland, United States

Organization
- Type: Non-profit, Community

Services
- Emergency department: Yes
- Beds: 74

History
- Opened: 1919

Links
- Website: http://www.calverthealthmedicine.org/
- Lists: Hospitals in Maryland

CalvertHealth in Prince Frederick, Maryland, is a non-profit community-owned hospital. There are over 200 active and consulting physicians on staff, representing over 40 medical specialties.

CalvertHealth also has offices located in Dunkirk, Maryland, Solomons, Maryland, and North Beach, Maryland.

Services at the hospital include an emergency department, an infusion therapy center, a community cancer program, a psychiatric unit with adolescent services and emergency evaluations, full outpatient services with endoscopy suite, a pain management center, a sleep disorders center, and radiology.

CalvertHealth is accredited by the Joint Commission on Accreditation of Healthcare Organizations, licensed by the Maryland Department of Health and Mental Hygiene, and certified for Medicare and Medicaid.

== History ==
CalvertHealth was originally located along Main Street in Prince Frederick until the 1950s, when it moved to a single-story facility on 100 Hospital Road. In 1978, the hospital moved to its current five-story building adjacent to the old hospital building.

CalvertHealth was formerly known as Calvert Memorial Hospital. On September 14, 2017, CalvertHealth broke ground for a $51 million expansion to convert into all private rooms, and it changed its name and logo to CalvertHealth Medical Center.
