= Dares Beach, Maryland =

Unincorporated community in Maryland, United States

- Unincorporated community
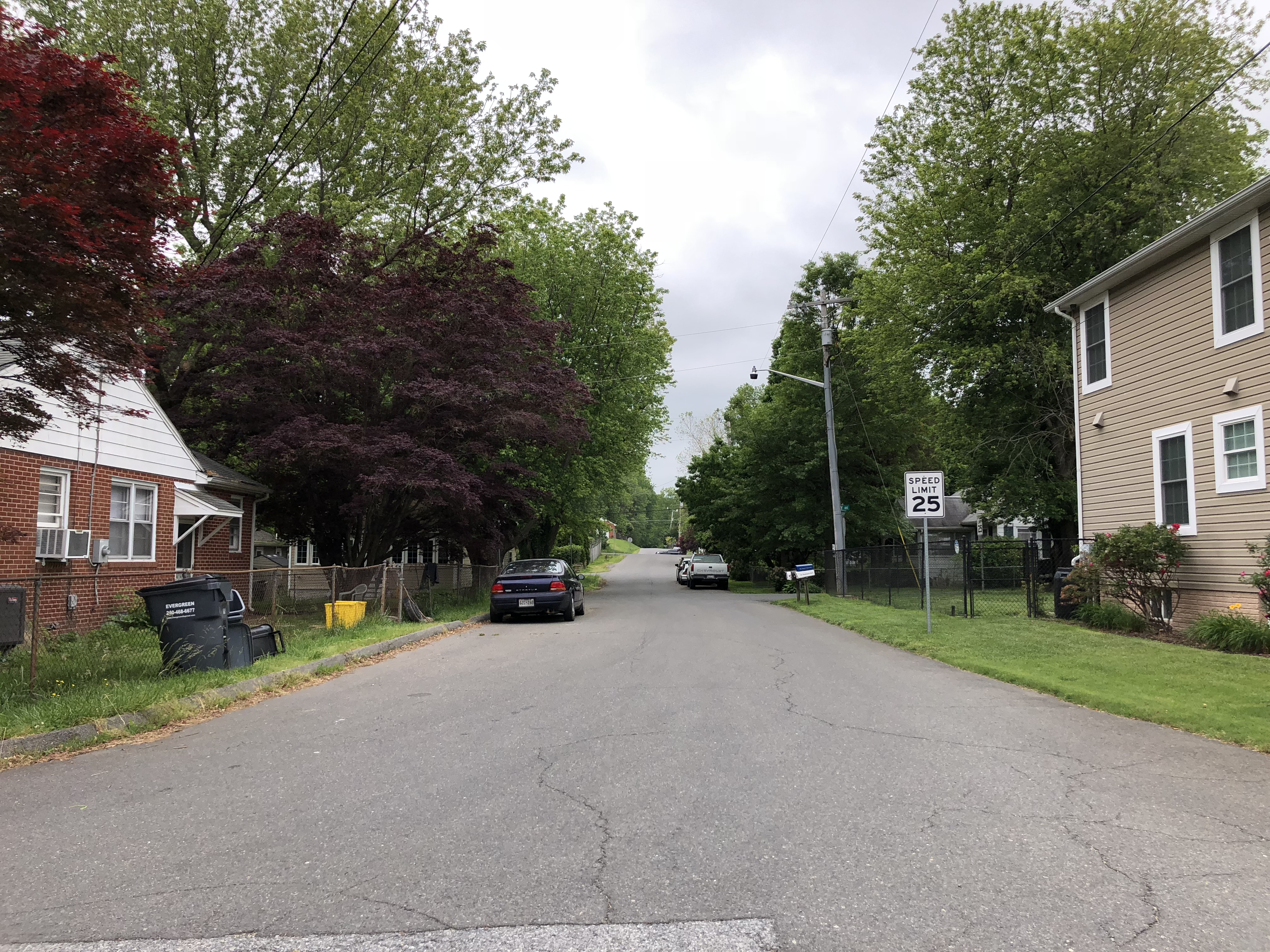
- View west along Maryland State Route 768 (Virginia Street) at Chesapeake Avenue.

- Location within Maryland
- Coordinates: 38°33′42″N 76°30′56″W
- Country: United States
- State: Maryland
- County: Calvert
- Elevation: 3 ft (0.91 m)
- Time zone: UTC-5 (Eastern (EST))
  - Summer (DST): UTC-4 (EDT)
- ZIP code: 20678
- Area codes: 410, 443, and 667
- GNIS feature ID: 590064

Dares Beach is a residential unincorporated community located in Calvert County, Maryland, United States. Dares Beach is situated along the Chesapeake Bay. It utilizes the Prince Frederick ZIP code and is approximately four miles east of the town center of Prince Frederick at the eastern terminus of MD 402. Notable residents of Dares Beach include former Maryland state senator and Patuxent River advocate Bernie Fowler, spy novelist Tom Clancy, and television/film actor Michael Willis, whose credits include HBO's The Wire and Men in Black.
