= Cedar Hill (Barstow, Maryland) =

Historic house in Maryland, United States

- U.S. National Register of Historic Places
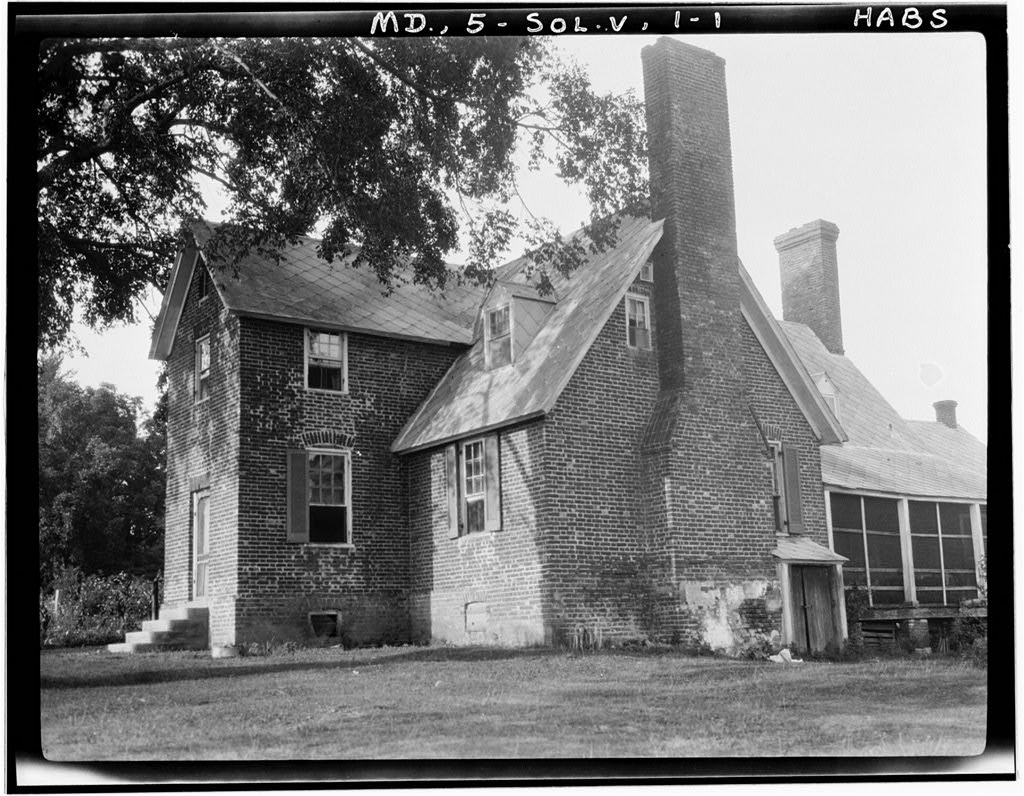
- Cedar Hill, 1936 HABS Photo

- Location within Maryland Location within the United States
- Nearest city: Barstow, Maryland
- Coordinates: 38°31′57″N 76°37′58″W
- NRHP reference No.: 73000905
- Added to NRHP: May 22, 1973

Cedar Hill is a historic home located on 75 acres (300,000 m^{2}) at Barstow, Calvert County, Maryland, United States. It is one of the few remaining cruciform dwelling houses existing in Maryland, built in the 18th century that is typical of 17th-century architecture. It is a 1 1/2-story house with a 2-story porch tower, built of brick laid in Flemish bond. It is now operated as a private farm and home to a variety of livestock such as cattle, swine and chickens.

Cedar Hill was listed on the National Register of Historic Places in 1973.
