= Linden (Prince Frederick, Maryland) =

Historic house in Maryland, United States

- U.S. National Register of Historic Places
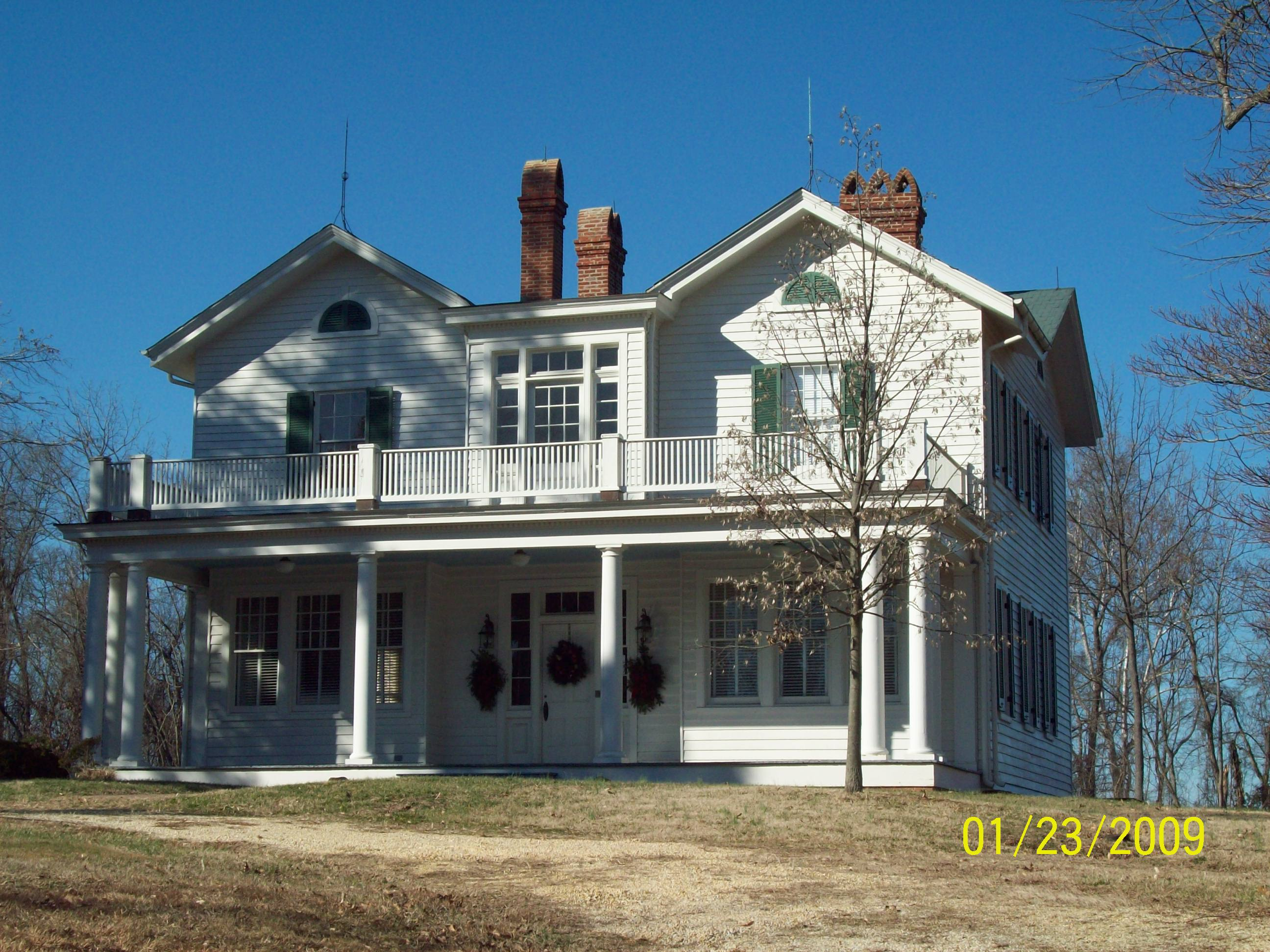
- Linden, December 2008

- Location within Maryland Location within the United States
- Location: 70 Church St., Prince Frederick, Maryland
- Coordinates: 38°32′24″N 76°35′16″W
- Built: 1868
- Architect: Gray, John B., Sr.
- Architectural style: Italianate, Colonial Revival
- NRHP reference No.: 00000285
- Added to NRHP: March 24, 2000

Linden is a historic home located at Prince Frederick, Calvert County, Maryland. It is a two-story frame house, conservatively Italianate in style built about 1868, with conservative Colonial Revival additions of about 1907. Behind the house are ten standing outbuildings, seven dating to the 19th century, three of which are of log construction. It is home to the Calvert County Historical Society.

It was listed on the National Register of Historic Places in 2000.

== Gallery ==
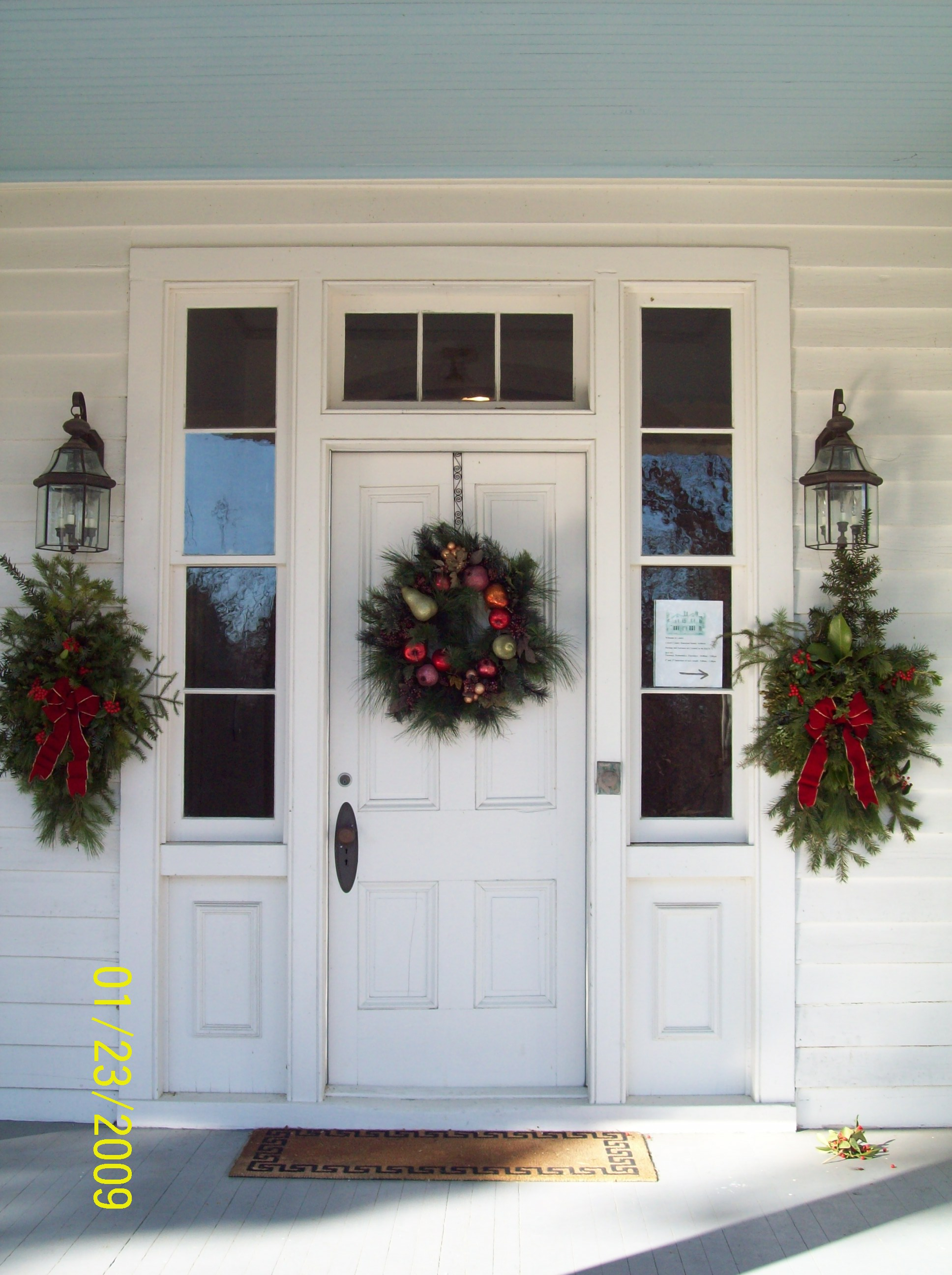
Linden - Door Detail, December 2008
