= Benedict, Maryland =

- Census-designated place
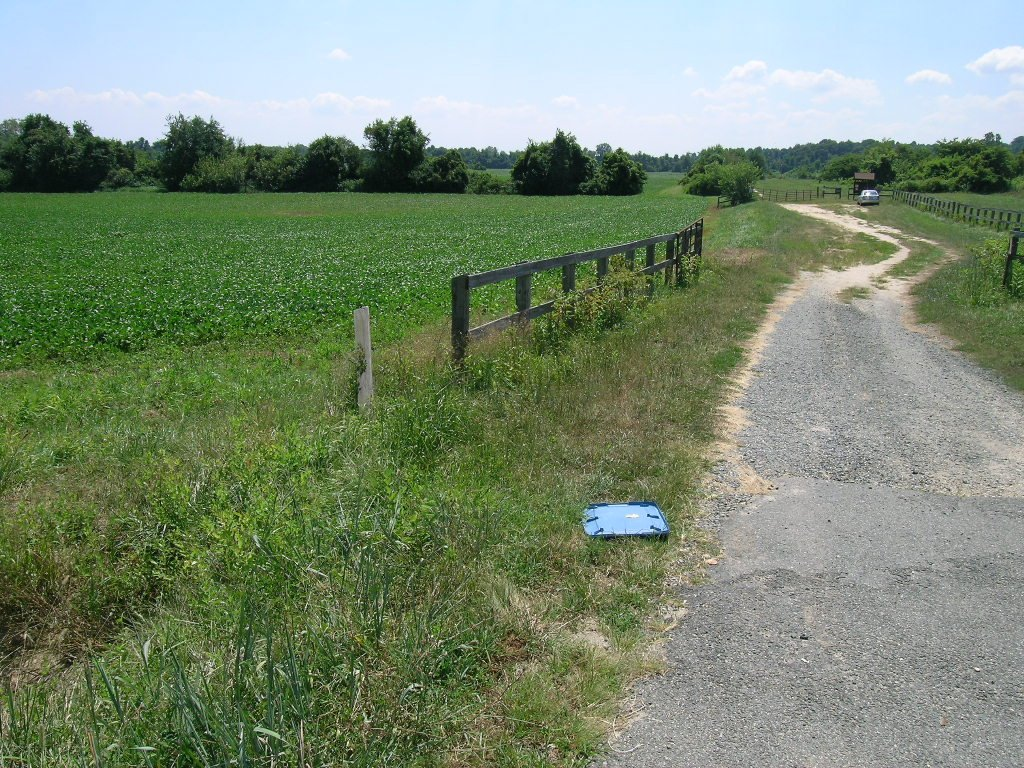
- Landscape in Benedict

- Location within the state of Maryland Benedict (the United States)
- Coordinates: 38°30′33″N 76°40′47″W
- Country: United States
- State: Maryland
- County: Charles

Area
  - Total: 0.23 sq mi (0.60 km^{2})
  - Land: 0.23 sq mi (0.60 km^{2})
  - Water: 0 sq mi (0.00 km^{2})

Population (2020)
  - Total: 232
  - Density: 993.6/sq mi (383.63/km^{2})
- Time zone: UTC−5 (Eastern (EST))
  - Summer (DST): UTC−4 (EDT)
- ZIP code: 20612
- FIPS code: 24-06550
- GNIS feature ID: 583152

Benedict is an unincorporated town and census-designated place in Charles County, Maryland, United States, located on the Patuxent River in southern Maryland. As of the 2010 census, it had a population of 261.

== Demographics ==
Historical population
| Census | Pop. | Note | %± |
|---|---|---|---|
| 2020 | 232 | | — |
U.S. Decennial Census; 2010 2020

Benedict first appeared as a census designated place in the 2010 U.S. census.

== History ==
Originally a fishing village along the Patuxent River in the southern Province of Maryland in the late 17th century, it was named Benedict-Leonardtown for Benedict Leonard Calvert, (1700–1732), 15th Proprietary Governor of Maryland, serving under his older brother, Charles Calvert, 5th Baron and Lord Baltimore, (1699–1751).

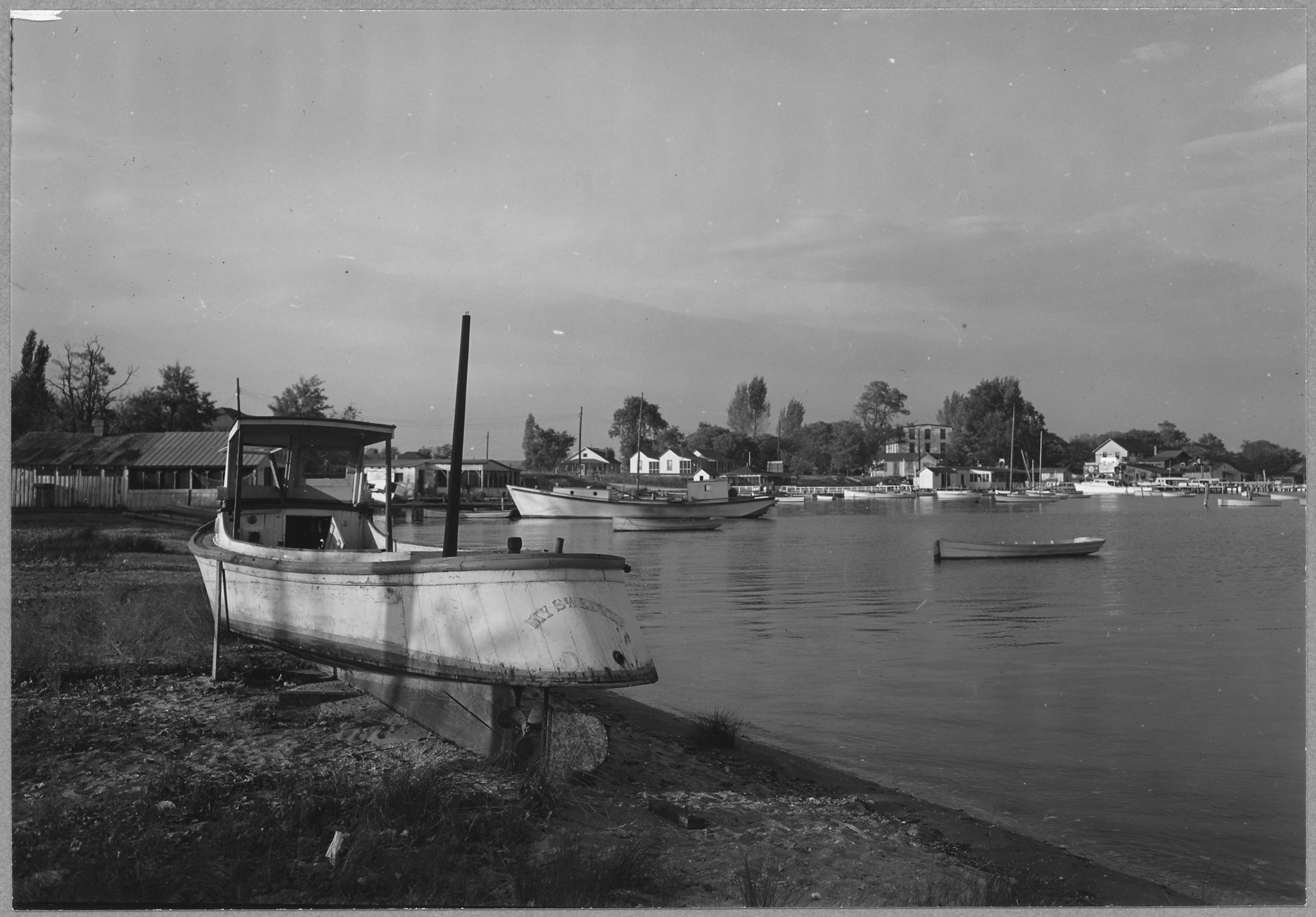
Oyster boats and pleasure craft docked in the Patuxent River at Benedict, 1941

=== War of 1812 ===
In the War of 1812, Benedict was the location where the British Army led by General Robert Ross landed on August 18, 1814, after having fought fierce naval battles with American naval forces in the Patuxent. From Benedict, the British began their march to Washington, D.C., routing a larger American force at the Battle of Bladensburg before ultimately burning the capital. Following this, they failed to capture Baltimore in the Battle of Baltimore.

=== Civil War ===
Benedict was the site of Camp Stanton, constructed in October 1863 for the Maryland 7th Regiment. Camp Stanton was also the location where the Maryland 19th Regiment of the United States Colored Troops was formed on December 19, 1863, with freed slaves who were purchased for their freedom by the United States Government to serve as soldiers. This unit distinguished itself at the Battle of the Wilderness. Some of its members included the Rev. William Saunders Crowdy and his brother Daniel, of a plantation in St. Mary's County.

A school was established on the site to educate the black soldiers, most of whom had received no education when they were slaves. The school was run by Samuel C. Armstrong.

== Benedict today ==
Adjacent to the town is the Benedict Bridge, a 0.5-mile-long (0.80 km) bridge where Maryland Route 231 crosses the Patuxent River from Charles County into Calvert County. The town also has one or two seafood restaurants, and a Catholic church, St. Francis de Sales, that celebrates mass in Latin.
