= Willow Glenn =

Historic house in Maryland, United States

- U.S. National Register of Historic Places
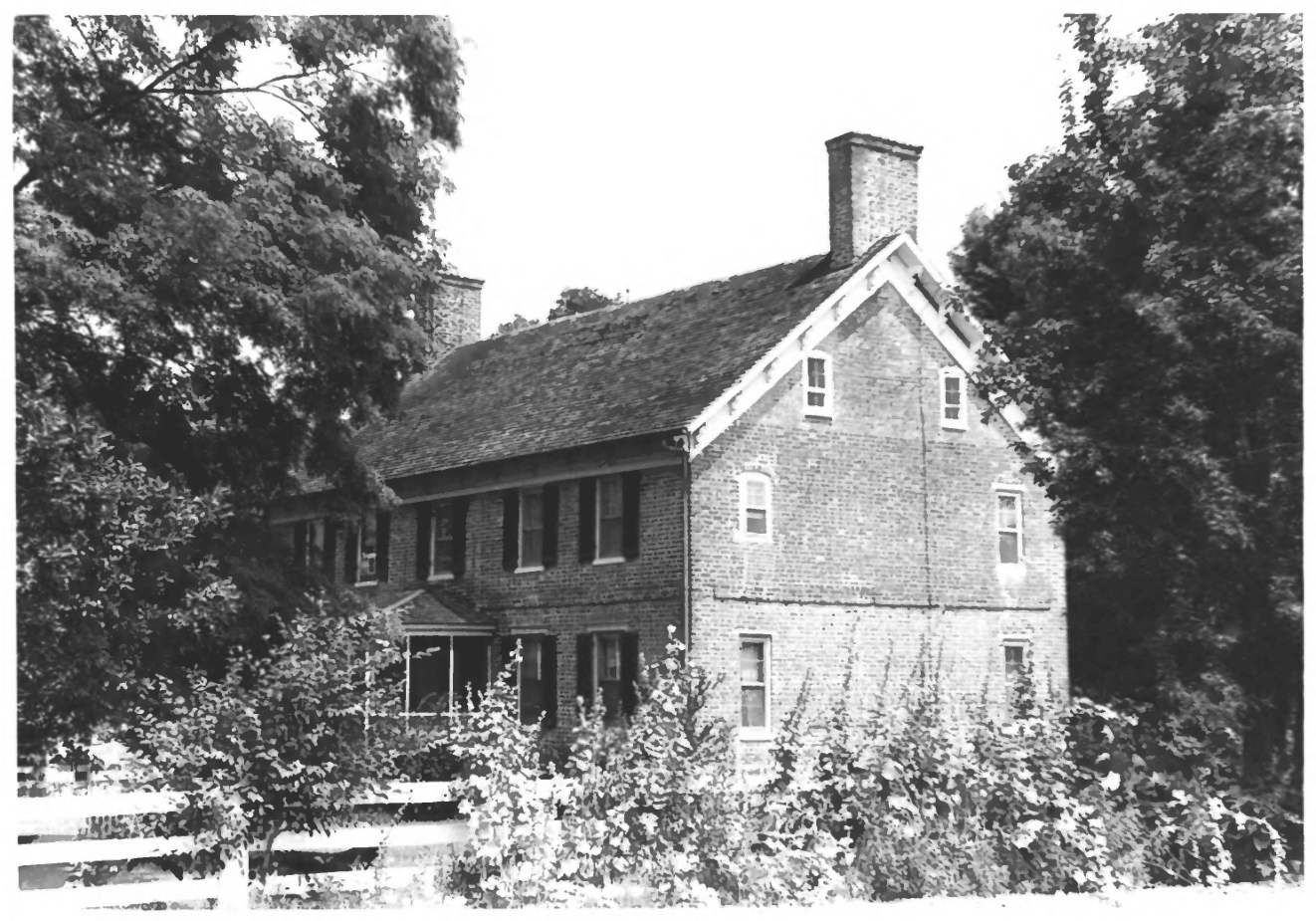
- The house in 1972

- Location within Maryland Location within the United States
- Location: Northwest of Barstow on Barstow Rd., Barstow, Maryland
- Coordinates: 38°32′44″N 76°38′6″W
- Area: 187.5 acres (75.9 ha)
- Architectural style: Georgian
- NRHP reference No.: 73000906
- Added to NRHP: July 2, 1973

Willow Glenn is a historic home located at Barstow, Calvert County, Maryland, United States. It is an impressive Georgian structure of grand proportions; constructed entirely of brick in Flemish bond with random glazed headers. The home typifies the kind of dwelling erected by Maryland's wealthiest tobacco planters of the colonial period.

Willow Glenn was listed on the National Register of Historic Places in 1973.
