= Barstow, Maryland =

Unincorporated community in Maryland, U.S.

Coordinates: 38.527202°N 76.614962°W

Barstow is a small, rural unincorporated community located at the crossroads of MD 231, German Chapel Road, and Barstow Road in Calvert County, Maryland, United States, immediately west of Prince Frederick. The community maintains its own zip code of 20610.

There are no residential structures and no one resides in Barstow. The only building in Barstow is the post office. The new Calvert County Fairgrounds are located near Barstow, moving from their original location in central Prince Frederick in the late 1990s. A branch of College of Southern Maryland is very close by.

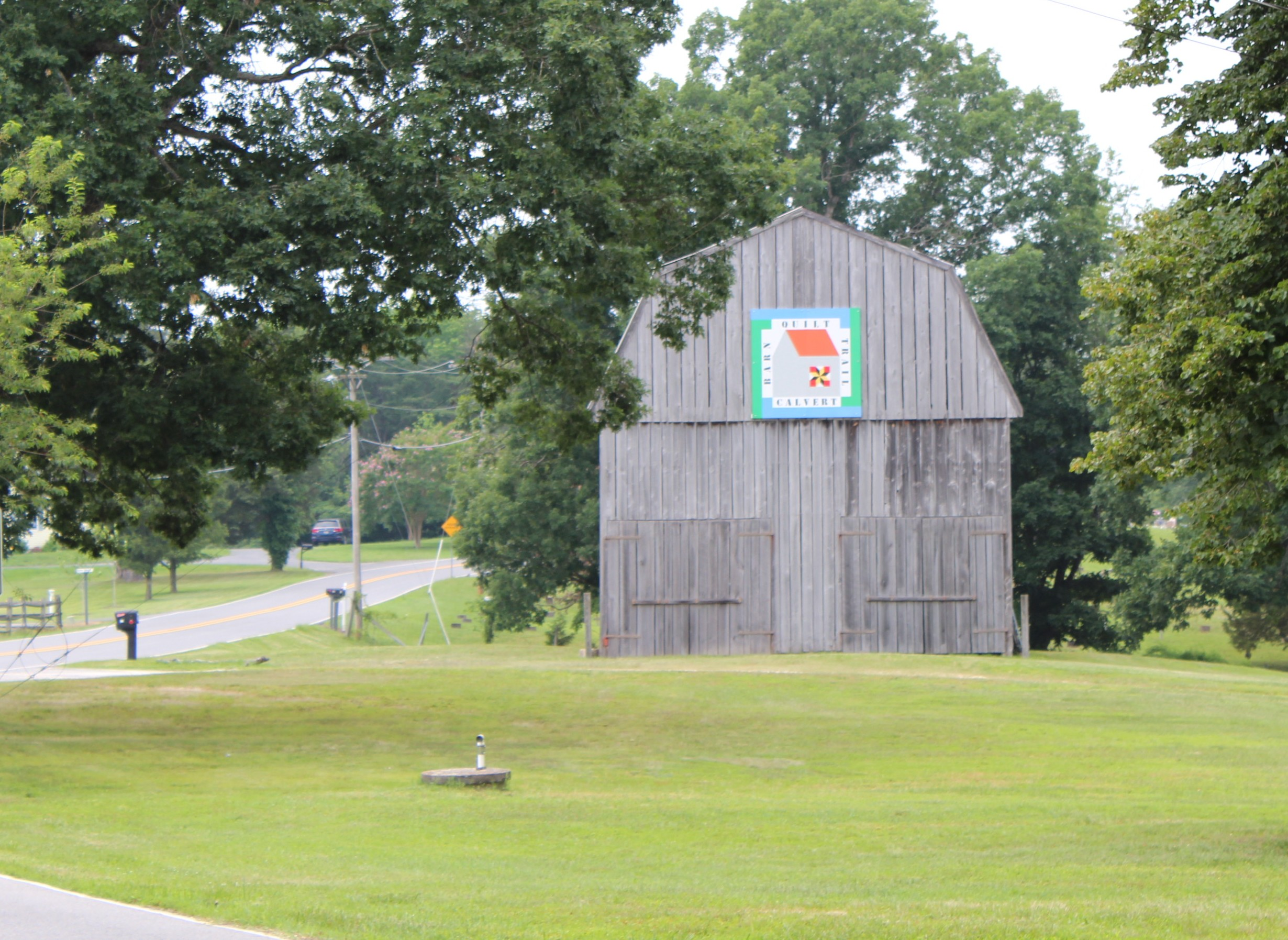
Barn just off the intersection of Barstow Road and Maryland Route 231 that features one of the designs from the "Calvert Barn Quilt Trail"

Cedar Hill and Willow Glenn were listed on the National Register of Historic Places in 1973.
