= Ripley, Maryland =

Unincorporated community in Maryland, United States

- Unincorporated community
- Location within the state of Maryland Ripley (the United States)
- Coordinates: 38°32′41″N 77°04′42″W
- Country: United States
- State: Maryland
- County: Charles
- Time zone: UTC-5 (Eastern (EST))
  - Summer (DST): UTC-4 (EDT)
- GNIS feature ID: 591134

Ripley is an unincorporated community in Charles County, Maryland, United States. It was named after a local family, and has a large Baptist church.
