= Taney Place =

Historic house in Maryland, United States

- U.S. National Register of Historic Places
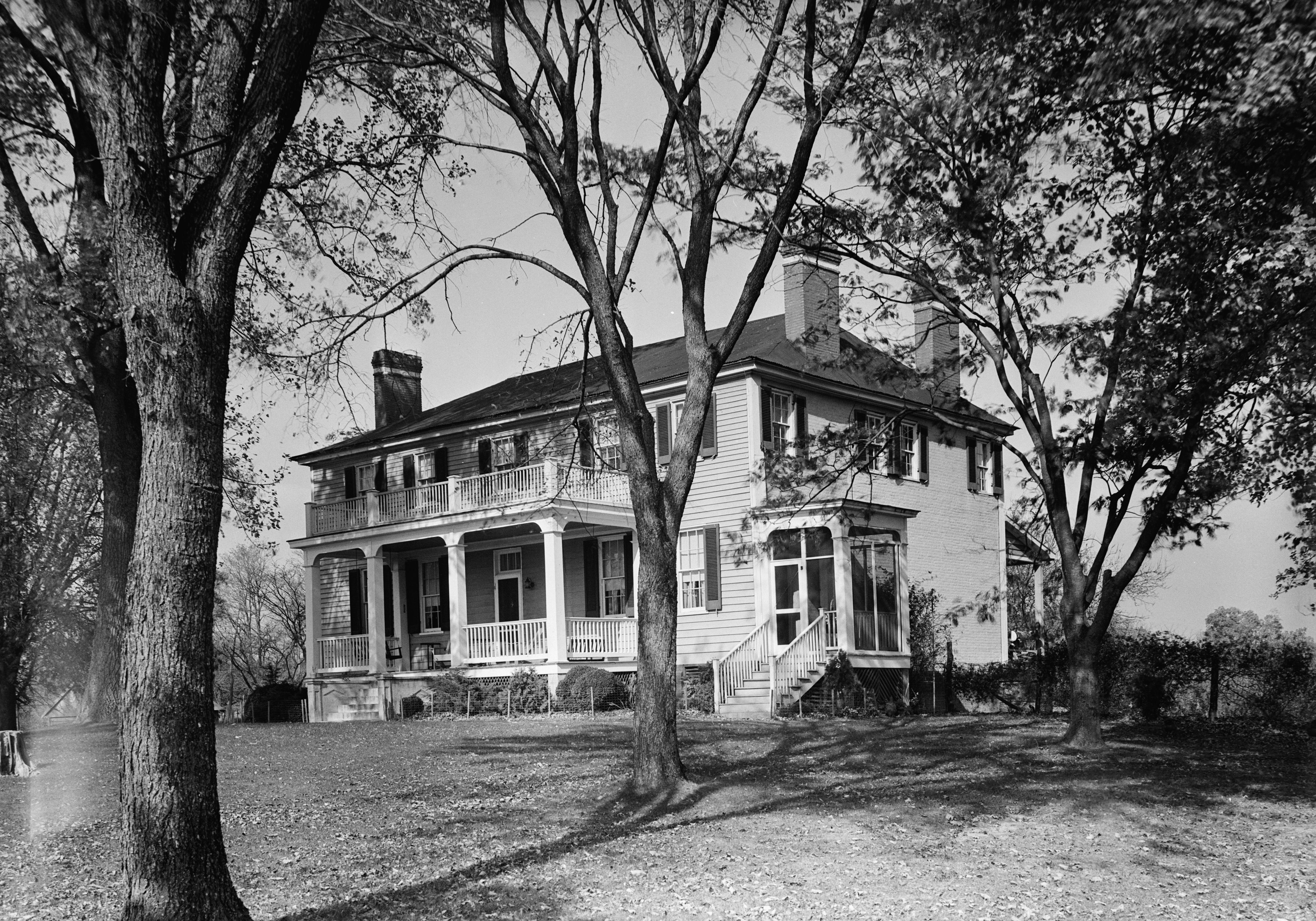
- Taney Place, 1936 HABS Photo

- Location within Maryland Location within the United States
- Nearest city: Adelina, Maryland
- Coordinates: 38°27′44″N 76°36′19″W
- Built: 1750
- Architectural style: Georgian
- NRHP reference No.: 72000570
- Added to NRHP: September 22, 1972

Taney Place is a historic home located at Adelina, Calvert County, Maryland, United States. It is a simple, two-story, hip-roofed, Georgian-style country house, dating from about 1750. It was the birthplace and childhood home of Roger Brooke Taney (1777–1864), who served as Chief Justice of the Supreme Court of the United States from 1836 to 1864.

It was listed on the National Register of Historic Places in 1972.
