= Governor Thomas Johnson Bridge =

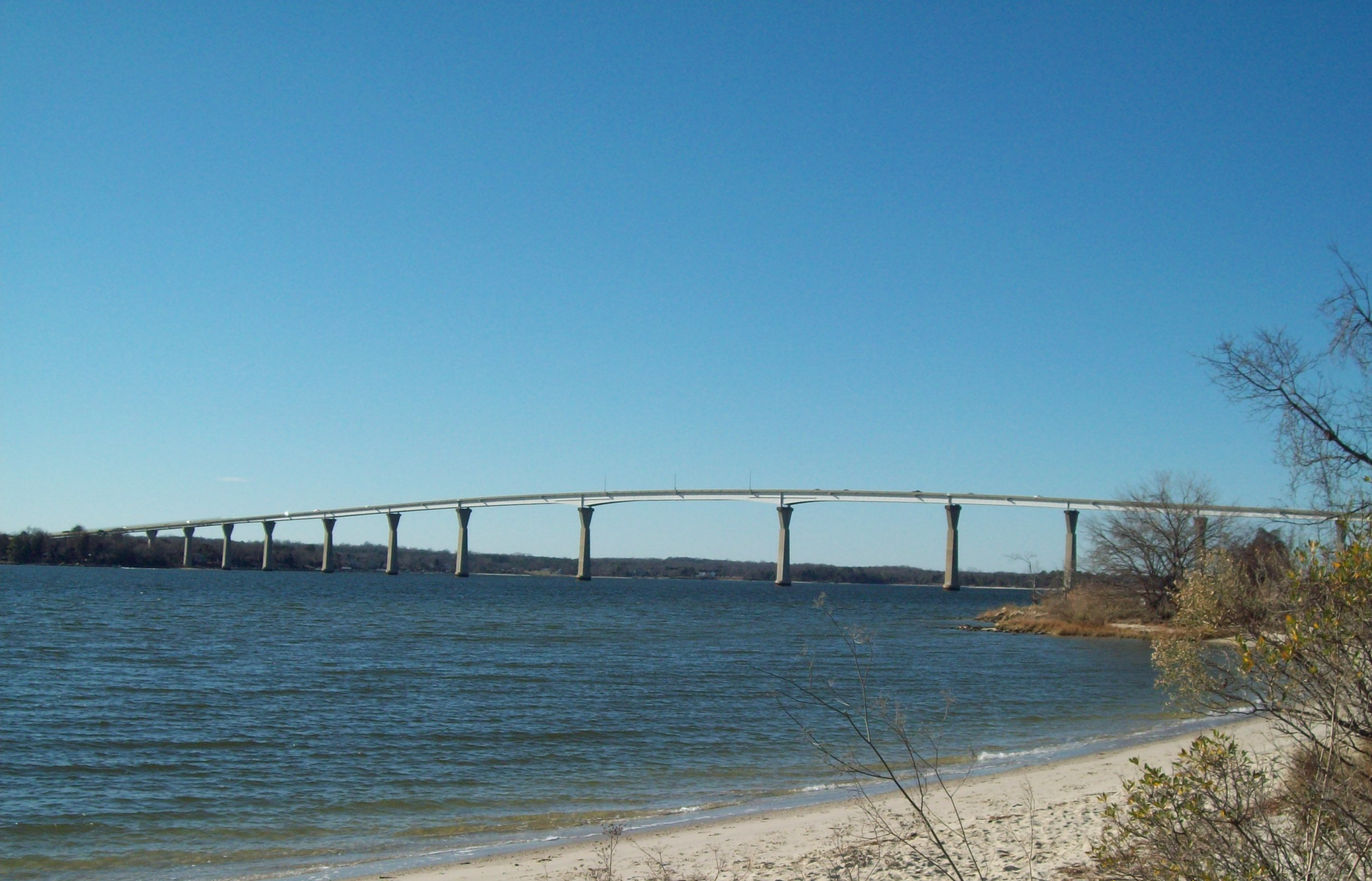
- Gov. Thomas Johnson Bridge, Solomons, Md., December 2008
- Coordinates: 38°19′35″N 76°28′17″W
- Carries: 2 lanes of MD 4
- Crosses: Lower Patuxent River
- Official name: Governor Thomas Johnson Bridge
- Other name(s): Thomas Johnson Bridge, Solomons Bridge

Characteristics
- Height: 160 feet

History
- Opened: December 17, 1977

Location
- Interactive map of Governor Thomas Johnson Bridge

The Governor Thomas Johnson Memorial Bridge (also referred to as the Thomas Johnson Bridge and the Solomons Bridge) is a 1.37-mile (2.20 km) bridge in Maryland over the lower Patuxent River joining Calvert and St. Mary's counties. The bridge, named for the first governor of Maryland, Thomas Johnson, saw construction start in 1972 and opened to traffic on December 17, 1977.

The bridge, carrying an average of 33,000 vehicles a day on Maryland Route 4 (MD 4), is one of two crossings of the Patuxent River in Southern Maryland (the other is the Benedict Bridge approximately 20 miles up river, where MD 231 connects Calvert County and Charles County).

The north end of the bridge, on the Calvert side, is located in Solomons. Just prior to the bridge, MD 2-4 narrows from four lanes to two, and MD 2 exits the highway, passing under the bridge and heading toward downtown Solomons. MD 4 continues onto the bridge itself and over the Patuxent River.

== Description ==
The bridge, carrying two lanes and no shoulders, rises to a height of approximately 160 feet (49 m) tall. From the top of the bridge, one can see the entire town of Solomons, the runways at the Patuxent River Naval Air Station, the Dominion Cove Point LNG, and the Chesapeake Bay.

The bridge begins in St. Mary's County, before even reaching the Patuxent River. It passes over Town Creek first, then crosses over the unincorporated community of Spencers Wharf on a viaduct. Once over the community, the bridge passes over the Patuxent River, entering Calvert County. Shortly after reaching land, MD 2 joins MD 4 and cross Calvert County together for a long concurrency on a four-lane divided highway.

The Thomas Johnson Bridge is a variable depth beam bridge. Massive concrete pilings hold the bridge up over the river.

== Problems ==
In the summer of 1988, cracks were found in the foundation of the Thomas Johnson Bridge, causing it to be closed for repairs over several months. People traveling north into Calvert County were forced to make a half-hour detour to the Benedict Bridge. People traveling south into St. Mary's County were likewise forced to either utilize the Benedict Bridge or take a free charter boat across the Patuxent River to a park and ride lot on the southern side.

As of September 2007, there has been much talk and public debate over either expanding the Thomas Johnson Bridge by adding a parallel span, or replacing the bridge with a four-lane span. The reasons for such proposals are twofold. First, the recent increase in the amount of traffic of commuters traveling to and from the Patuxent River Naval Air Station has made the two-lane, single-span bridge functionally obsolete. Traffic on the bridge during rush hour can cause back-ups all the way back to the Route 235 intersection, and instances where there is an accident on the bridge itself can cause total gridlock.

Secondly, the fear of more structural issues of the Thomas Johnson Bridge arising (such as the one in 1988), coupled with the apparent over-capacity use of the bridge on a daily basis, has caused some safety concerns about the bridge's stability. These fears have grown substantially in the wake of the I-35W Mississippi River bridge collapse in Minneapolis, Minnesota on August 1, 2007. As of September 2007, a study to determine whether the bridge should be expanded or replaced is being debated by Maryland governmental officials.

== Incident history ==
The bridge has a history of traffic accidents; some minor resulting in a slight delay to major accidents resulting in the bridge being closed for numerous hours. Also, at times the bridge has been closed numerous times for Maintenance and Repairs. Since the bridge opened in December 1977 (up to October 2021), at least 15 people have jumped off the bridge and died, and six have now jumped and survived, according to Southern Maryland Newspapers accounts.

July 24, 1992; fugitive survives 100-ft dive.

Feb. 11, 2008; Serious vehicle crash resulting in a fatality.

May 2, 2011, at approximately 10:55 pm; single vehicle accident with 3 trapped.

April 9, 2013, at approximately 6:30 p.m; Suicide.

Feb. 16, 2015, at 6:33 pm; Serious vehicle crash resulting in a fatality.

May 1, 2015, at approximately 1:18 a.m; single vehicle accident resulting in driver flown to Shock Trauma and another passenger taken by ambulance to the hospital.

September 28, 2015, at approximately 7:55 am; head-on collision with 4 vehicles with 1 subject trapped.

March 18, 2016; 4-car accident, rear-end collision.

April 29, 2016, at approximately 12:38p. Head-On/Serious motor vehicle crash, 3 vehicles involved; 1 driver flown to Shock Trauma and another transported by ambulance to the hospital. Bridge was closed till 2:40 pm (2 hours).

September 6, 2016, reports started around 7 am for a major pothole, later to learn that the manhole cover had been stolen. Bridged closed for 2–3 hours and then 1 lane operation for 10 hours while SHA temporarily repair/replace the manhole.

October 7, 2016, at approximately 2:35 p.m; suicide attempt and then flown to Prince George's Hospital Center

November 10, 2016, approximately 4:37 pm. Head-On/Serious motor vehicle crash with fatality; 3 vehicles involved. 1 passenger flown out, several transported to the hospital by ambulance. Bridge was closed for several hours.

On December 14, 2022, at approximately 10:15 p.m., police, fire and rescue personnel responded to a multiple vehicle collision with 4 occupants reportedly injured.

== Future ==
On May 16, 2013, Governor Martin O'Malley signed the Transportation Infrastructure Investment Act of 2013, which increases the gasoline tax to fund transportation infrastructure projects. The governor's announcement specifically includes $20 Million for design of a new Thomas Johnson Bridge.
