= Bowens, Maryland =

Unincorporated community in Maryland, U.S.

Coordinates: 38°29′43″N 76°37′20″W

Bowens is an unincorporated community located at the crossroads of MD routes 506 and 508 in Calvert County, Maryland, United States.
