= Adelina, Maryland =

Unincorporated community in Maryland, U.S.

- Unincorporated community
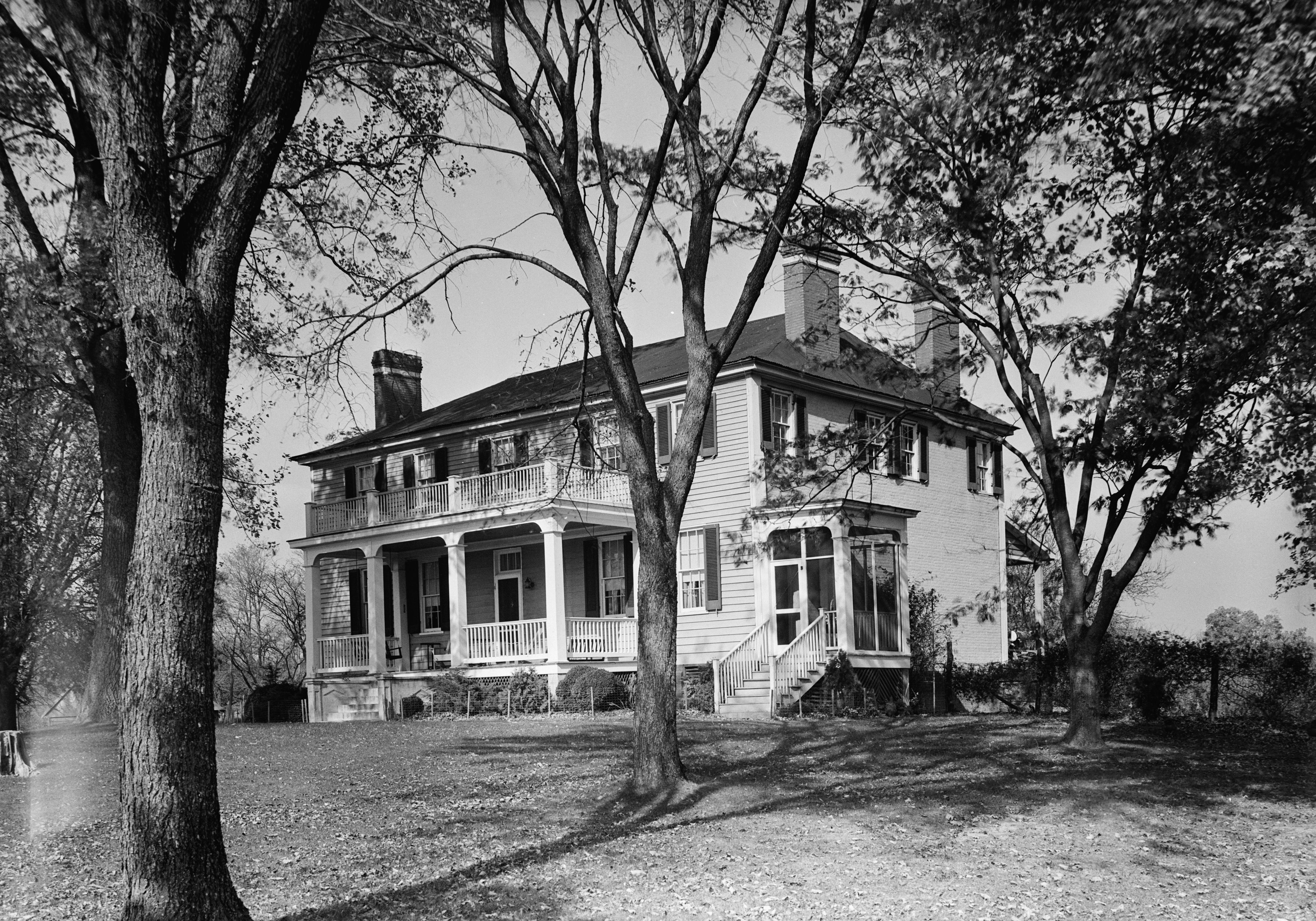
- Taney Place in 1936

- Location within Maryland Location within the United States
- Coordinates: 38°28′50″N 76°37′17″W
- Country: United States
- State: Maryland
- County: Calvert
- Time zone: UTC-5 (Eastern (EST))
  - Summer (DST): UTC-4 (EDT)

Adelina is an unincorporated community located along Adelina Road in Calvert County, Maryland, United States. Taney Place was listed on the National Register of Historic Places in 1972.
