= Prince Frederick, Maryland =

- Census-designated place
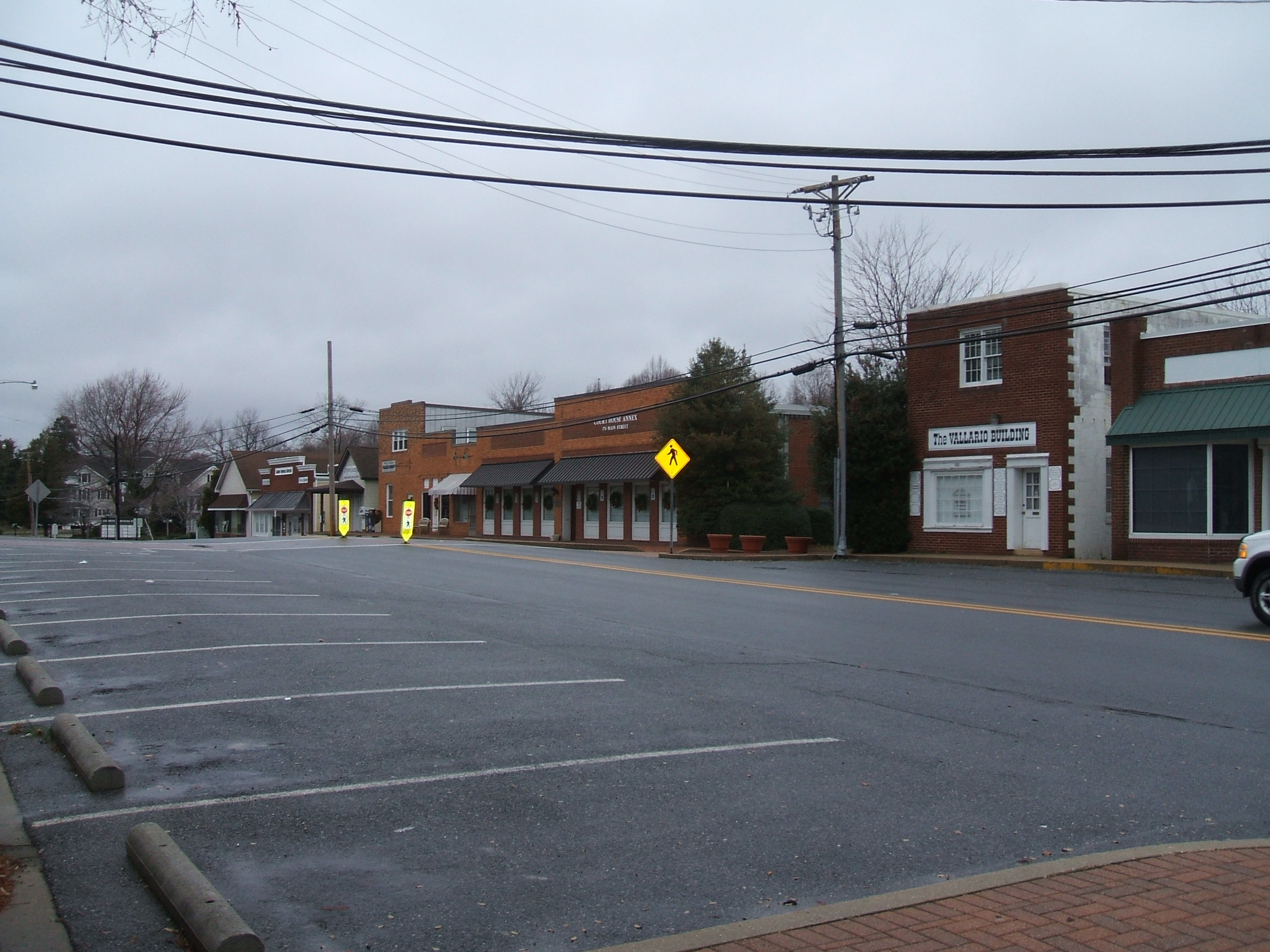
- Downtown Prince Frederick

- Location of Prince Frederick, Maryland
- Coordinates: 38°32′55″N 76°35′19″W
- Country: United States
- State: Maryland
- County: Calvert
- Founded: 1722
- Named for: Frederick, Prince of Wales

Area
  - Total: 3.67 sq mi (9.50 km^{2})
  - Land: 3.66 sq mi (9.49 km^{2})
  - Water: 0.0039 sq mi (0.01 km^{2})
- Elevation: 138 ft (42 m)

Population (2020)
  - Total: 3,226
  - Density: 880.9/sq mi (340.11/km^{2})
- Time zone: UTC−5 (Eastern (EST))
  - Summer (DST): UTC−4 (EDT)
- ZIP code: 20678
- Area code: 410
- FIPS code: 24-63950
- GNIS feature ID: 0591073

Prince Frederick is an unincorporated community and census-designated place (CDP) in Calvert County, Maryland, United States. As of the 2020 census, the population of Prince Frederick was 3,226, up from 2,538 in 2010. It is the county seat of Calvert County.

== Geography ==
Prince Frederick is located in the center of Calvert County at 38°32′55″N 76°35′19″W (38.548720, −76.588748).

According to the United States Census Bureau, the CDP has a total area of 3.7 square miles (9.5 km^{2}), of which 0.004 square miles (0.01 km^{2}), or 0.11%, is water.

=== Climate ===
The climate in this area is characterized by hot, humid summers and generally mild to cool winters. According to the Köppen Climate Classification system, Prince Frederick has a humid subtropical climate, abbreviated "Cfa" on climate maps.

== Demographics ==
Historical population
Census	Pop.	Note	%±
2020	3,226		—
U.S. Decennial Census

=== 2020 census ===
As of the 2020 census, Prince Frederick had a population of 3,226. The median age was 37.3 years. 24.4% of residents were under the age of 18 and 17.9% were 65 years of age or older. For every 100 females, there were 76.9 males, and for every 100 females age 18 and over, there were 73.9 males.

0.0% of residents lived in urban areas, while 100.0% lived in rural areas.

There were 1,269 households in Prince Frederick, of which 34.8% had children under the age of 18 living in them. Of all households, 37.0% were married-couple households, 16.4% were households with a male householder and no spouse or partner present, and 41.2% were households with a female householder and no spouse or partner present. About 33.8% of all households were made up of individuals and 18.1% had someone living alone who was 65 years of age or older.

There were 1,362 housing units, of which 6.8% were vacant. The homeowner vacancy rate was 1.8% and the rental vacancy rate was 6.5%.

Racial composition as of the 2020 census
Race	Number	Percent
White	1,817	56.3%
Black or African American	876	27.2%
American Indian and Alaska Native	16	0.5%
Asian	129	4.0%
Native Hawaiian and Other Pacific Islander	7	0.2%
Some other race	105	3.3%
Two or more races	276	8.6%
Hispanic or Latino (of any race)	169	5.2%

=== 2000 census ===
As of the 2000 census, there were 1,432 people, 583 households, and 303 families residing in the CDP. The population density was 439.9 inhabitants per square mile (169.8/km^{2}). There were 616 housing units at an average density of 189.2 per square mile (73.1/km^{2}). The racial makeup of the CDP was 62.22% White, 33.80% African American, 0.07% Native American, 2.51% Asian, 0.56% from other races, and 0.84% from two or more races. Hispanic or Latino of any race were 1.82% of the population.

There were 583 households, out of which 25.9% had children under the age of 18 living with them, 29.2% were married couples living together, 17.3% had a female householder with no husband present, and 48.0% were non-families. 43.6% of all households were made up of individuals, and 24.7% had someone living alone who was 65 years of age or older. The average household size was 2.14 and the average family size was 2.96.

In the CDP, the population was spread out, with 21.9% under the age of 18, 9.8% from 18 to 24, 25.4% from 25 to 44, 16.8% from 45 to 64, and 26.0% who were 65 years of age or older. The median age was 40 years. For every 100 females, there were 72.5 males. For every 100 females age 18 and over, there were 64.4 males.

The median income for a household in the CDP was $22,321, and the median income for a family was $44,625. Males had a median income of $38,393 versus $19,700 for females. The per capita income for the CDP was $21,868. About 14.0% of families and 19.5% of the population were below the poverty line, including 25.7% of those under age 18 and 21.5% of those age 65 or over.

== History ==
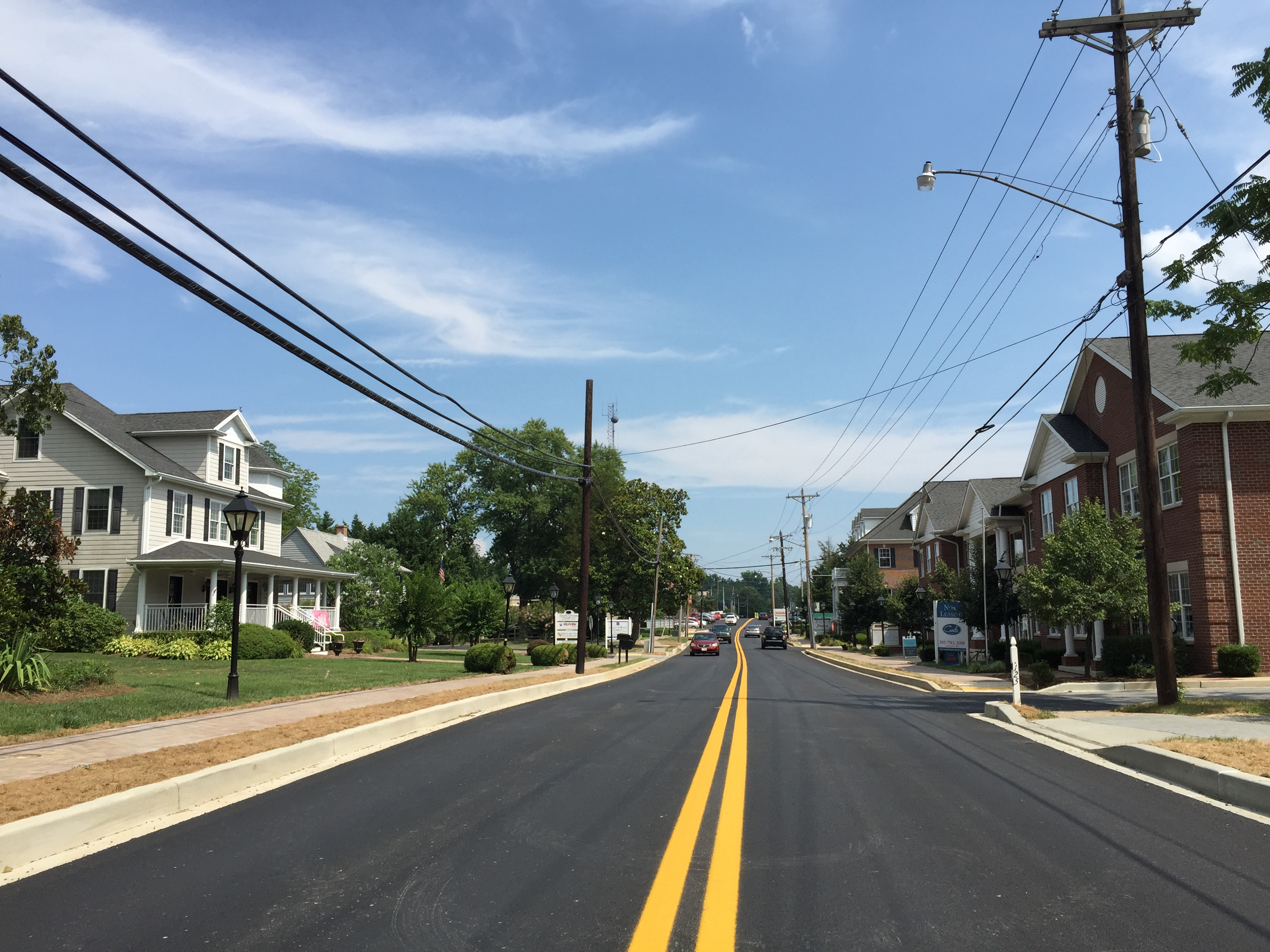
Main Street in Prince Frederick

Prince Frederick has served as the county seat of Calvert County since 1722, when officials chose a plot of land known as "Williams' Old Field" as the spot for the new county courthouse. (Contemporary references to the piece of land include an upscale dining restaurant named Old Field Inn, and a street in Prince Frederick named "Old Field Lane.") The original courthouse was finally completed in 1732. The town was most likely named for George II's son Frederick, who was Prince of Wales during the time of the town's original conception.

In the War of 1812, Commodore Joshua Barney's Chesapeake Bay Flotilla found refuge from the advancing British in St. Leonard's Creek, several miles south of Prince Frederick, in June 1814. While laying siege to Barney's force, the British under the command of Admiral Sir Alexander Cochrane plundered and destroyed the area nearby, including burning the town of Prince Frederick.

In 1882, Prince Frederick burned a second time, when a massive fire destroyed virtually the entire town and its courthouse. A new courthouse was erected on the same spot, and remains the center of Calvert County's government to this day.

In the 1960s, Albert Irvin Cassell, a prominent mid-twentieth-century African-American architect in Washington, D.C., sought to develop Chesapeake Heights on the Bay, a 520-acre (2.1 km^{2}) summer resort community for African-Americans. The project was to feature houses, a motel, shopping centers, a pier, a marina, beaches, and a clubhouse fronting the Chesapeake Bay. Roads and a few homes were built by 1969, but the project ended with Cassell's death in that same year.

In 1984, Prince Frederick was named one of seven "town centers" by Calvert County's government. The town center designation meant that while Prince Frederick was still not formally incorporated, special zoning regulations would be enacted and boundaries would be established so new growth would be centered around the existing commercial and residential districts. This was done in order to take advantage of existing infrastructure and discourage poorly planned urban sprawl. Prince Frederick's town center status also meant the creation of special architectural review boards who would encourage theme and unity of new buildings built within the town center.

Linden was listed on the National Register of Historic Places in 2000.

On April 28, 2002, an F4 tornado passed just south of Prince Frederick, killing one person. The same tornado had also devastated the downtown business district of La Plata in neighboring Charles County.

== Transportation ==
Solomons Island Road, the main Calvert County artery

Solomons Island Road is the major north–south artery through Prince Frederick and carries two Maryland Route designations: Maryland Route 2, which runs from Baltimore to Solomons, and Maryland Route 4, an extension of Pennsylvania Avenue from Washington, D.C., which continues past Solomons over the Governor Thomas Johnson Bridge across the Patuxent River to St. Mary's County. Route 4 was dualized in the mid-1970s, and commuter buses run on it to DC. Routes 2 and 4 join north of Prince Frederick near Sunderland. Route 2 from there north is only a two-lane road to Annapolis.

In 2009, a portion of Route 2–4 in Prince Frederick was widened to three lanes in each direction.

Maryland Route 231 (Hallowing Point Road) intersects Solomons Island Road and runs west, ultimately crossing the Patuxent River and continuing into Charles County. Maryland Route 402 (Dares Beach Road) leads east to Dares Beach on Chesapeake Bay. Maryland Route 765 serves as Prince Frederick's Main Street and provides access to the courthouse and government center.

In the mid-1990s, a series of new loop roads and side streets were approved in Prince Frederick in order to divert local traffic off Route 2-4 and alleviate thru-traffic congestion. The first of these roads, Prince Frederick Boulevard, has been completed between Maryland Route 231 and Stoakley Road. A second portion of the road, Chesapeake Boulevard, opened in 2010 on the eastern side of Route 2-4 and provides access to the new Calvert Middle School. Additional roads are planned around the southern portions of town.

== Institutions and organizations ==
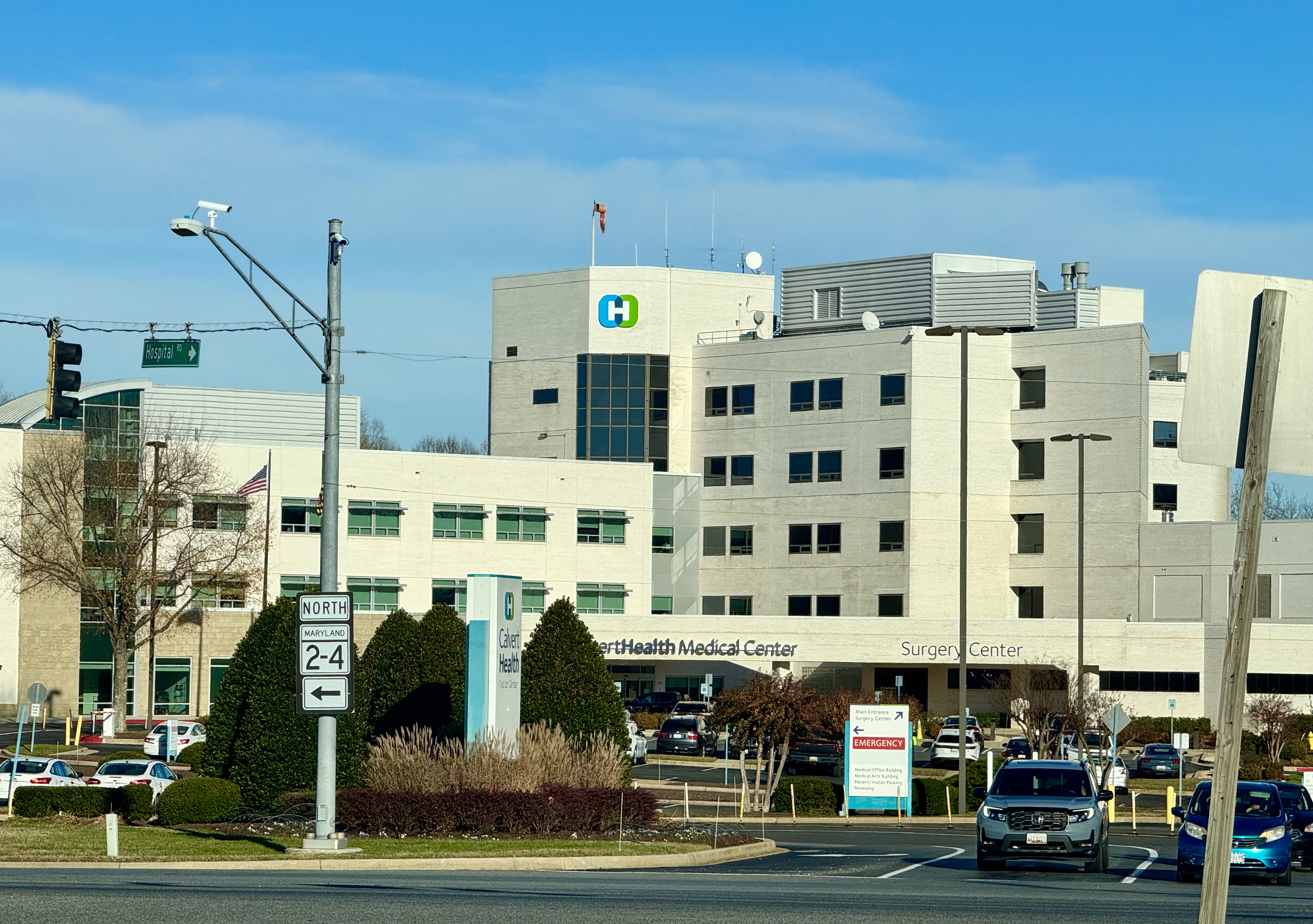
CalvertHealth Medical Center

Prince Frederick has its own volunteer fire department and rescue squad. Prince Frederick is served by one hospital, Calvert Memorial Hospital, which moved into its current facility in 1978.

There is one public high school in Prince Frederick, Calvert High School, with the mascot being the Cavaliers. In 2000, the Cavaliers won the Maryland Division 3A high school football championship. Prince Frederick also has a public middle school and public elementary school.

In 2005, the Calvert County branch of the College of Southern Maryland opened its new Prince Frederick campus, replacing the earlier campus at Port Republic.

Several churches and other religious institutions call Prince Frederick home. These include St. John Vianney Catholic Church, St. Paul's Episcopal Church, Trinity United Methodist Church, First Baptist Church of Calvert County, Full Gospel Assembly of God, and the Southern Maryland Islamic Center.

Prince Frederick is Calvert County's main commercial and retail hub, as it contains at least five major shopping centers, numerous chain and independent restaurants, three hotels, and Calvert County's only movie theater.

While many in the Prince Frederick area commute to jobs all over the Baltimore-Washington Metropolitan Area, there are several small companies based in Prince Frederick itself. On the western side of Prince Frederick, there is a large industrial park which attracted numerous businesses and places of commerce after offering free land sites. One such business is Recorded Books, L.L.C., the largest independent publisher of unabridged audio books in the world.

There are two newspapers circulated in Calvert County - The Calvert Recorder, published every Wednesday and Friday, and The Calvert Gazette, published every Thursday. A third newspaper, The Calvert Independent, went out of business in 2010.

In 2006, the main branch of the Calvert Library moved from its original downtown Prince Frederick location to a new larger facility on Costley Way, named after Russell Costley, a prominent man who was a longtime advocate and trustee of the library.

In June 2010, the Edward T. Hall Aquatics Center opened its doors to the public. The center features an indoor ten-lane, 50-meter pool with a diving well as therapy and leisure pools. Hallowing Point Park is a county-owned recreational area west of Prince Frederick which features tennis courts, athletic fields for baseball, softball, and soccer, and hiking and jogging trails.

Notable places in the Prince Frederick area include Battle Creek Cypress Swamp—a local nature preserve—and the Arthur Storer Planetarium, which is located on the grounds of Calvert High School.

The Calvert County Fair is held every fall at the Calvert County Fairgrounds just outside Prince Frederick. The fair moved from its original location in downtown Prince Frederick in 1994.

Located on the southeastern side of town, there is a very large, triangular retention pond at the site of the Prince Frederick wastewater treatment plant. Final approval for the plant was obtained in December 2000. The plant's strange UFO-like appearance—approximately 500 feet (150 m) long per side and location in a secluded and heavily wooded area—in satellite imagery on Google Earth has evoked the curiosity of many locals, who have nicknamed the site the "Giant Triangle" and speculated on its purpose.

== Notable people ==
- Louis L. Goldstein, Comptroller of the Maryland Treasury 1959–1998; born in Prince Frederick in 1913. Known for his phrase, "God Bless Y'all Real Good".
- Earl F. Hance, Calvert County Commissioner and Secretary of the Maryland Department of Agriculture from May 2009 to January, 2015
- Angel Marcloid, American multi-instrumentalist
- Augustus Rhodes Sollers, congressman
- Roger Brooke Taney, the Chief Justice of the U.S. Supreme Court in the Dred Scott decision, was born and raised on a farm near Prince Frederick.

Best-selling author Tom Clancy operated an insurance business in Prince Frederick prior to his literary career and was an active parishioner of St. John Vianney Catholic Church, and still owned a home near Prince Frederick on Chesapeake Bay until his death in 2013.

While on the faculty of Chesapeake Biological Laboratory in nearby Solomons, noted theoretical ecologist Dr. Robert Ulanowicz resided near Prince Frederick prior to his retirement in 2008.
