= Timeline of Southern Maryland =

Southern Maryland
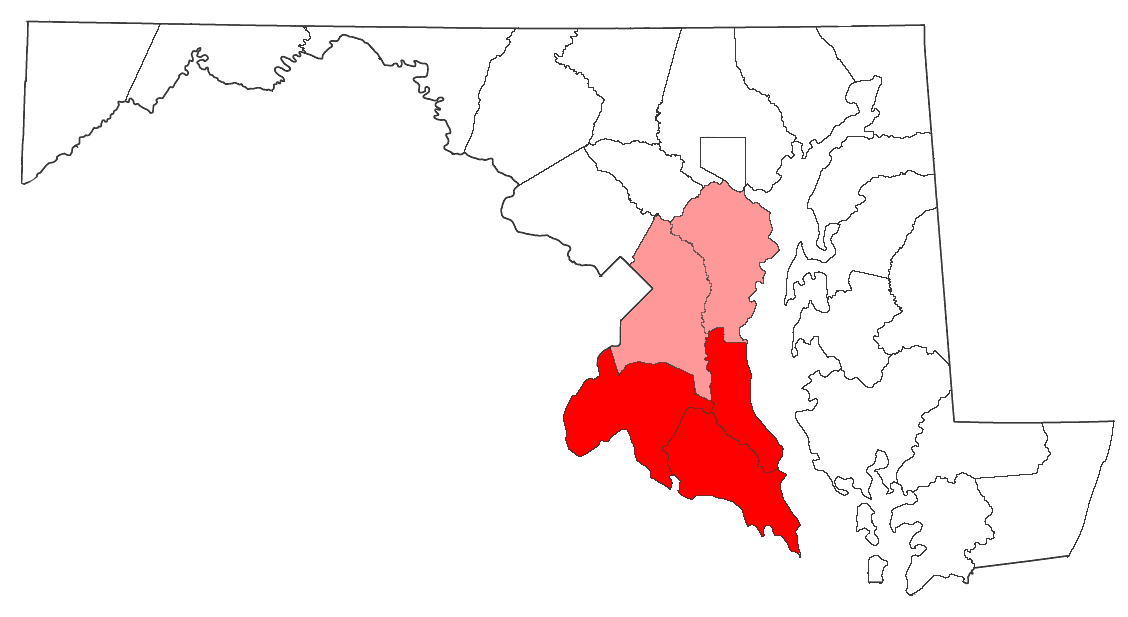
- The counties of Southern Maryland. According to the state of Maryland, the region includes all of Calvert, Charles, and St. Mary's counties (red) and the southern portions of Anne Arundel and Prince George's counties (light red)

The following is a timeline of the history of the region of Southern Maryland.

== 3rd century ==
- 200 - Beginning occupation of a Piscataway village near present-day Biscoe Gray.

== 14th century ==
- 1330 - Beginning occupation of the Piscataway village Moyaone.

== 17th century ==
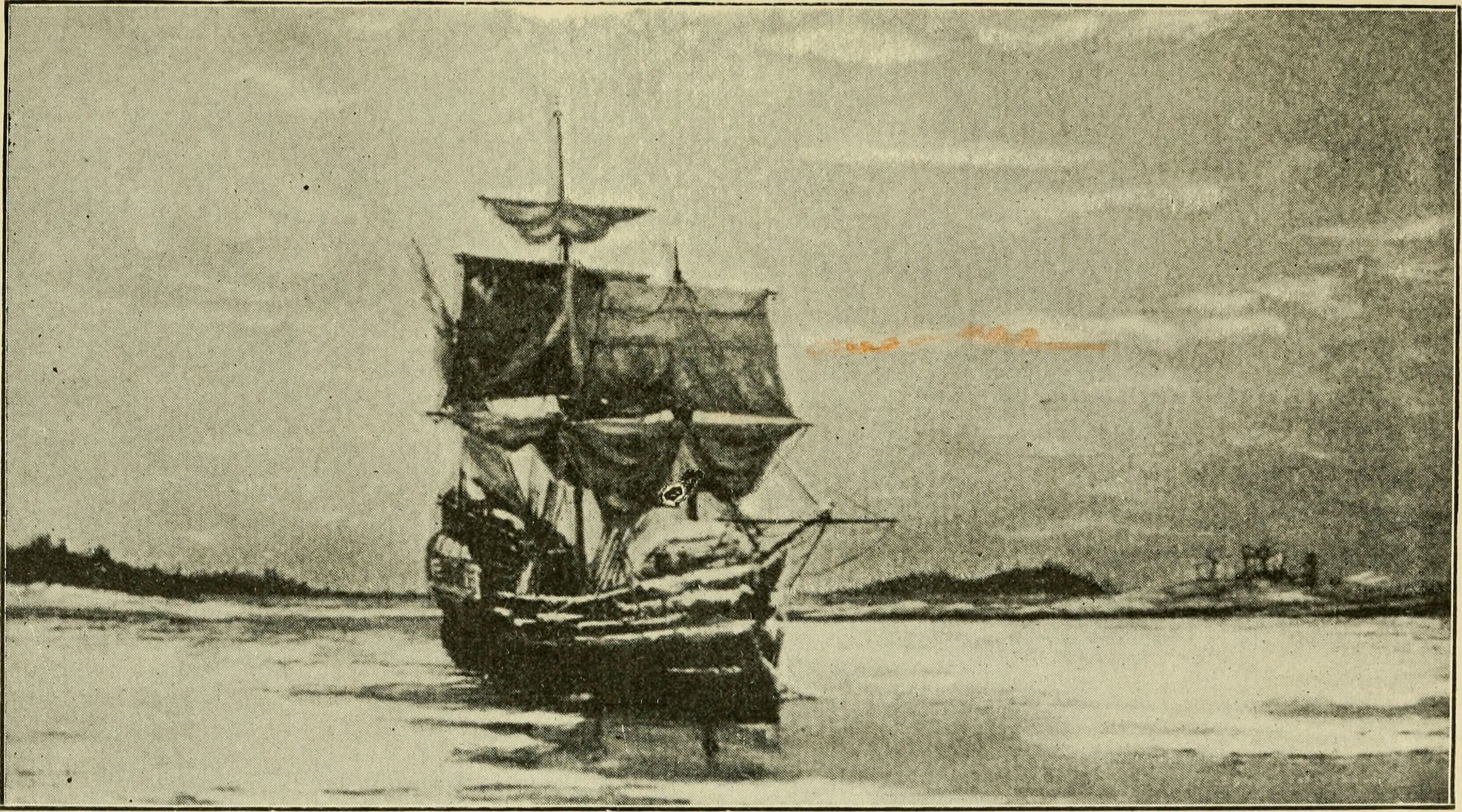
The arrival of The Ark in 1634 marked the beginnings of colonization in Southern Maryland.

=== 1600-1649 ===
- 1608 - John Smith and William Caliborne make contact with the Piscataway.
- 1623 - Moyaone is burned to the ground by Virginian colonists, the village would be rebuilt upon the same site.
- 1632 - Charles I of England deeds the land of Maryland to George Calvert, 1st Baron Baltimore.
- 1634 - The Ark and the Dove ships bring people to Southern Maryland, among them Leonard Calvert and Mathias de Sousa This would lead to the settling of St. Mary's City on the site of the abandoned village of Yacomoco.
- 1636 - The Piscataway tayac Wannas is murdered by his brother Kittamaquud, who goes on to rule in his place.
- 1640 July 5 - Kittamaquund is baptized by Jesuit Andrew White.
- 1641 - The Piscataway tayac Kittamaquund dies.
- 1642 - Mathias de Sousa votes as a freeman in the Maryland Propriety Assembly.
- 1644 - Beginning of Plundering Time that saw Richard Ingle temporarily take control of St. Mary's City.
- 1646 - Leonard Calvert regains control of St. Mary's City.
- 1649 April 12 - Maryland Toleration Act is passed in St. Mary's City.

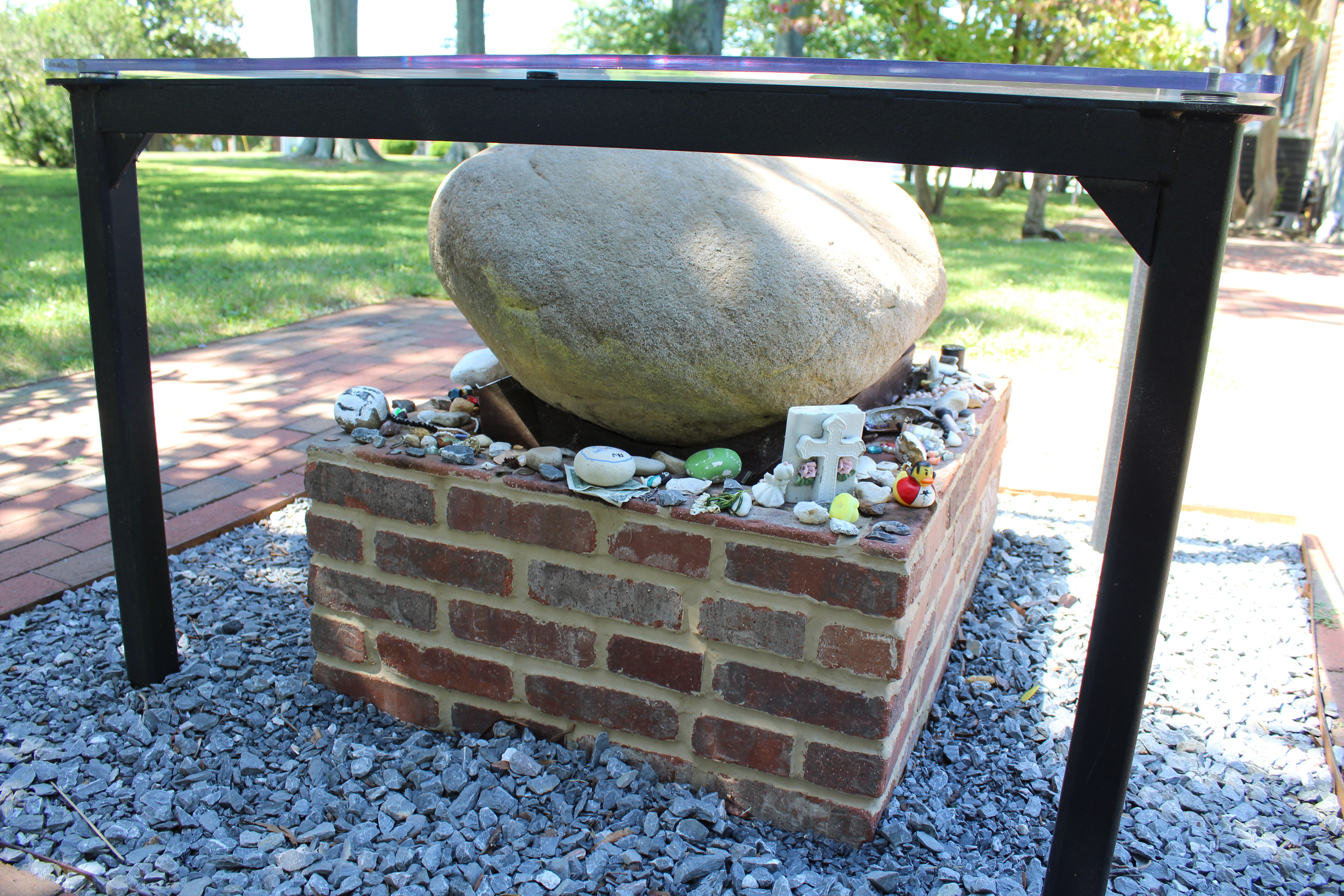
Witchcraft trials occurred in Maryland during the late 1600s. While Rebecca Fowler was the only person ever executed for such a crime, this is also the time that supposedly the mythical Moll Dyer died on top of a rock in St. Mary's County.

=== 1650-1699 ===
- 1650 - Anne Arundel County is organized.
- 1654 - Calvert County is organized.
- 1658 April 13 - Charles County is organized.
- 1666 April 20 - The 1666 Articles of Peace and Amity is signed between Maryland's government and 12 Eastern Algonquian-speaking Indigenous nations, including the Piscataway, Anacostanck, Doegs, Mikikiwomans, Manasquesend, Mattawoman, Chingwawateick, Hangemaick, Portobackes, Sacayo, Panyayo, and Choptico.
- 1669 - Piscataway Manor, an Indian reservation, is established. While centered on the former Piscataway city of Moyaone, the area would also include people of the 12 Eastern Algonquian-speaking Indigenous nations from the 1666 peace treaty.
- 1669 - The first Calvert County courthouse is built at Battle Town, near Battle Creek.
- 1675 - Cecil Calvert dies, Charles Calvert is sent to London to assume baronial rank, he would never return to Maryland
- 1676 - A group of Protestant Associators meet in Calvert County and publish Complaint from Heaven with a Huy and crye and a petitionout of Virginia and Maryland.
- 1681 - Maryland passes a law that children born to free black women and black children born to white women would be free.
- 1683 - Battle Town renamed "Calvertown."
- 1683 - Lower Marlborough is established.
- 1683 - Huntingtown is founded at the head of Hunting Creek.
- 1683 - Christ Church is established in Port Tobacco.
- 1685 October 9 - After being found guilty of bewitching Francis Sandsbury and others in Calvert County, Rebecca Fowler becomes the only person convicted and executed for witchcraft in Maryland.
- 1689 - Beginning of the Protestant Revolution in Maryland.
- 1692 - The Church of England is made the established church of the Maryland Colony. 30 Anglican Parishes are created, including St. James Parish in Lothian, St. Paul's Parish in Baden, and All Saints Parish in Sunderland.
- 1695 - Calvert County land is partitioned into parts of St. Mary's, Charles, and Prince George's counties, creating the boundaries of the county today.
- 1695 - Governor Francis Nicholson moves the colonial capital of Maryland from St. Mary's city to Annapolis.
- 1697 - Under the tayac Ochotomaquath, the Piscataway would come under the protection of the Onöndowa'ga:', and would flee north towards Pennsylvania.
- 1698 February - Local legend has it that Moll Dyer is chased from her home and supposedly dies kneeling on a rock in St. Mary's County.

== 18th century ==
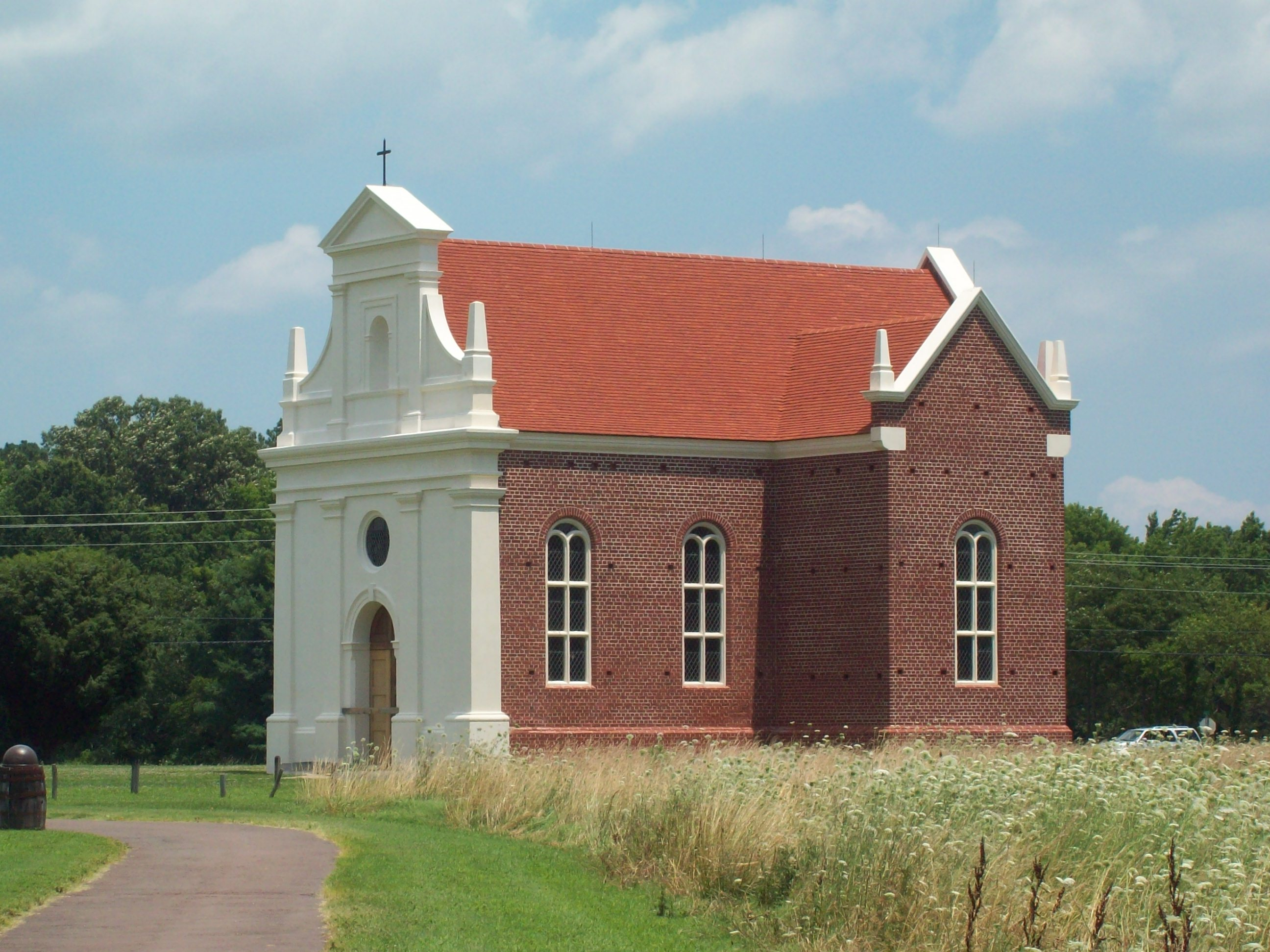
The 18th century saw religious persecution of Catholics in Southern Maryland, and a weakening of regional power following the moving of the state capital to Annapolis. The original Catholic Church in St. Mary's city shut down in 1704. Pictured here is a reconstructed church in July 2009.

- 1704 - Public worship of Catholicism is banned in Maryland.
- 1711 - After coming under the influence of the Great Law of Peace, the Piscataway become known by their anglicized Iroquois name "Conoy."
- 1718 - Roman Catholics are stripped of the right to vote in Maryland.
- 1721 March 19 - Upper Marlboro is designated the county seat of Prince George's county.
- 1725 November 5 - "Williams' Old Field" replaces Calvertown as the county seat for Calvert County following an Act of Assembly.
- 1728 October 30 - "Williams' Old Field" is renamed "Prince Frederick."
- 1732 - Construction completed for the Calvert County courthouse.
- 1732 November 4 - Thomas Johnson is born near St. Leonard's Creek.
- 1748 April 20 - Fire destroys Calvert County courthouse.
- 1776 - British troops land on St. George Island during the American Revolutionary War. They are later repelled by Maryland's Flying Camp militia under Rezin Beall.
- 1780 - British troops invade Calvert County, destroying property and burning buildings.
- 1783 - Maryland prohibits the importation of enslaved people.
- 1789 June 15 - Josiah Henson, who Harriet Beecher Stowe cites as being one of the inspirations for her 1852 novel Uncle Tom's Cabin, is born in Port Tobacco.
- 1779 January 14 - Joseph Kent is born in Calvert County.
- 1794 - Following the Battle of Fallen Timbers some members of the Piscataway tribe migrated south, returning to their ancestral lands in Maryland.

== 19th century ==
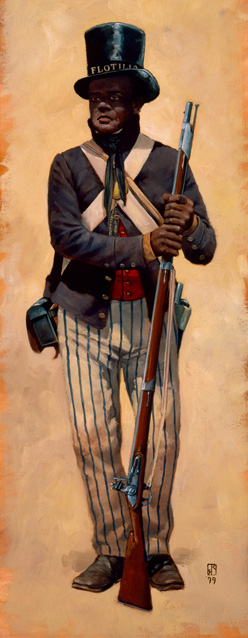
Soldiers like Charles Ball fought in the War of 1812 in Southern Maryland.

=== 1800-1849 ===
- 1814 June 8-10- Several attacks involving the Chesapeake Bay Flotilla take place near and around St. Leonard's Creek. During this time, many enslaved people living in Southern Maryland found freedom by fleeing to the British military.
- 1814 July 19- British burn the Prince Frederick Courthouse. At least 14 enslaved persons escaped to freedom via a British Vessel in Lower Marlboro.
- 1814 August - British soldiers arrive in Benedict and march north to Upper Marlboro.
- 1819 - Third Prince Frederick courthouse is constructed.
- 1837 - Charles Ball publishes his autobiography, “The Life and Adventures of Charles Ball."
- 1843 - Smithville United Methodist Church is built near present-day Dunkirk.
- 1845 July - Two enslaved men named Mark Caesar and Bill Wheeler lead a slave rebellion Charles County.

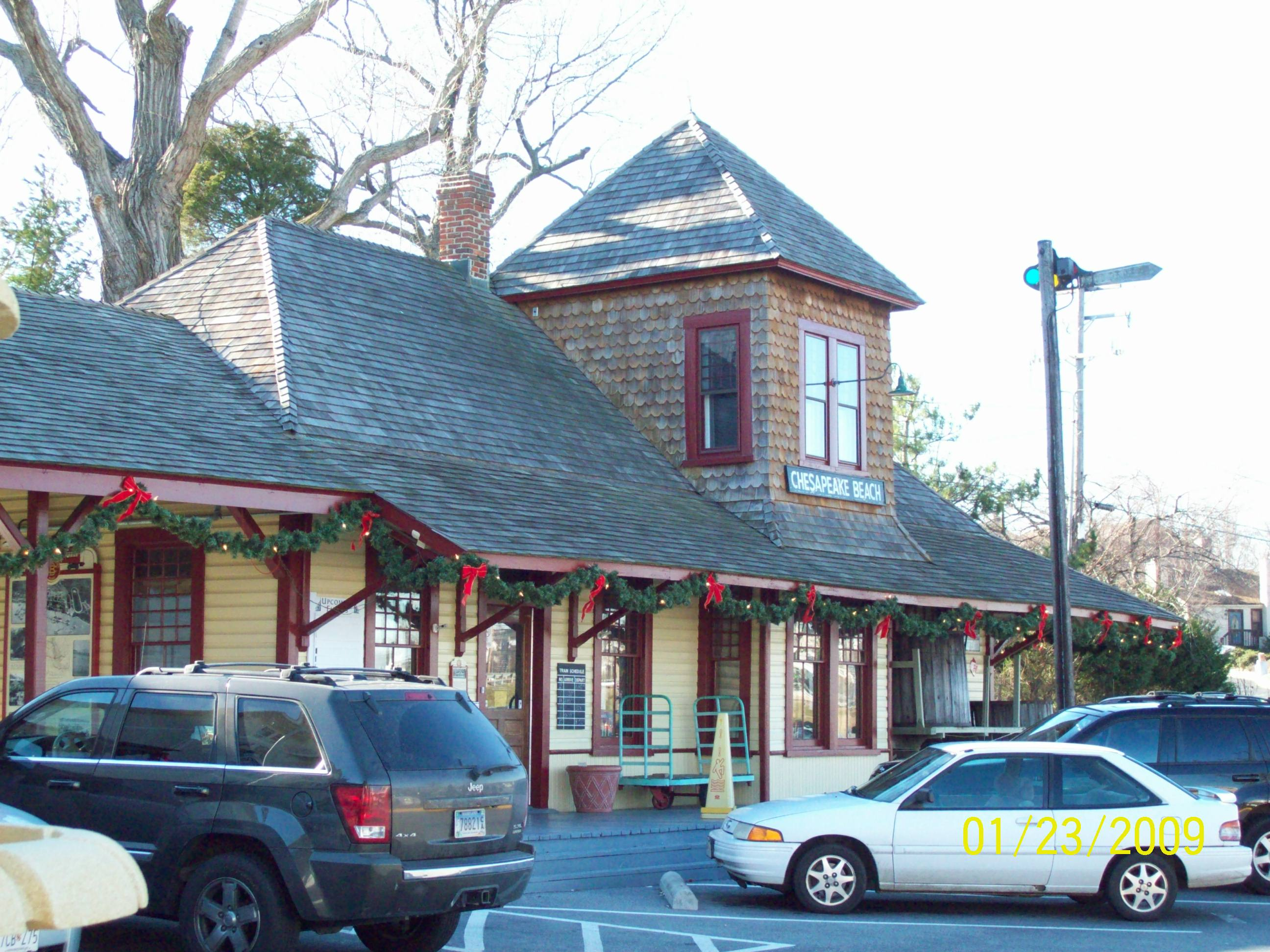
The late 1800's saw the planning, and failure of several railroad lines in Southern Maryland. Pictured here is the former Chesapeake Beach railway station, today the building operates as a museum.

=== 1850-1899 ===
- 1853 - Charter granted to the Baltimore and Potomac Railroad with their right of way running from Baltimore to Pope's Creek in Charles County.
- 1858 February 12 - The town on Leonardtown is incorporated.
- 1863 October - Camp Stanton, a site created for the recruiting and training of African American men, is established near Benedict.
- 1864 November 1 - Maryland ratifies a new constitution that prohibits slavery.
- 1865 - St. Edmonds United Methodist Church is built in Chesapeake beach with assistance from the Freedman's Bureau.
- 1865 April 15 - John Wilkes Booth stops at St. Catharine, Samuel Mudd's house in Waldorf.
- 1866 August 8 - Explorer Matthew Henson is born in Nanjemoy.
- 1867 - Isaac Solomon started a commercial fishery on what was then referred to as "Somervell's Island" or "Sandy Island," later to be known as Solomon's Island.
- 1868 March 20 - Southern Maryland Railroad is incorporated, with plans to connect Washington, D.C. to Point Lookout in St. Mary's County.
- 1868 March 30 - Baltimore and Drum Point Railroad Company receives a charter to connect the two points. No construction is ever completed.
- 1869 - Wallville School opens in Calvert County serving as a one-room schoolhouse for African American students.
- 1870 - Construction completed on a Solomon's Island Post Office and a causeway connecting the island to Calvert County's mainland.
- 1877 - Issac Davis completes construction of the first framed bugeye, "Clyde," on Solomons Island.
- 1881 - Courthouse built in Upper Marlboro.
- 1882 March 3 - Calvert County courthouse destroyed, along with its records, in a fire.
- 1883 October - Trains begin running on the Southern Maryland Railroad from Brandywine to Mechanicsville.
- 1884 - Fourth Prince Frederick courthouse is constructed.
- 1885 September - St. Mary's Academy opens.
- 1886 - Post office opens in Shady Side.
- 1886 April 1 0 The Southern Maryland Railroad is sold and reincorporated into the Washington & Potomac Railroad.
- 1886 April 7 - The town of Chesapeake Beach is incorporated.
- 1886 June 6 - Charles Whitley is lynched in Prince Frederick.
- 1887 - Benjamin Hance is lynched in Leonardtown.
- 1888 March 6 - The town of Chesapeake Beach's incorporation is repealed.
- 1888 April 4 - The towns of La Plata and Port Tobacco Village are incorporated.
- 1890 - Drayden African American Schoolhouse is built in St. Mary's county.
- 1891 - State of Maryland grants a charter to the Washington and Chesapeake Beach Railway Company.
- 1890 - Indian Head Naval Surface Warfare Center opens.
- 1894 April 3 - The town of Chesapeake Beach is reincorporated with the help of the Washington and Chesapeake Beach Railway Company.
- 1895 - Turkey Tayac is born.
- 1896 - Chesapeake Beach Railway Company takes over charter from the Washington and Chesapeake Beach Railway Company.
- 1896 - British immigrant Joseph Cocking is lynched in Port Tobacco.

== 20th century ==
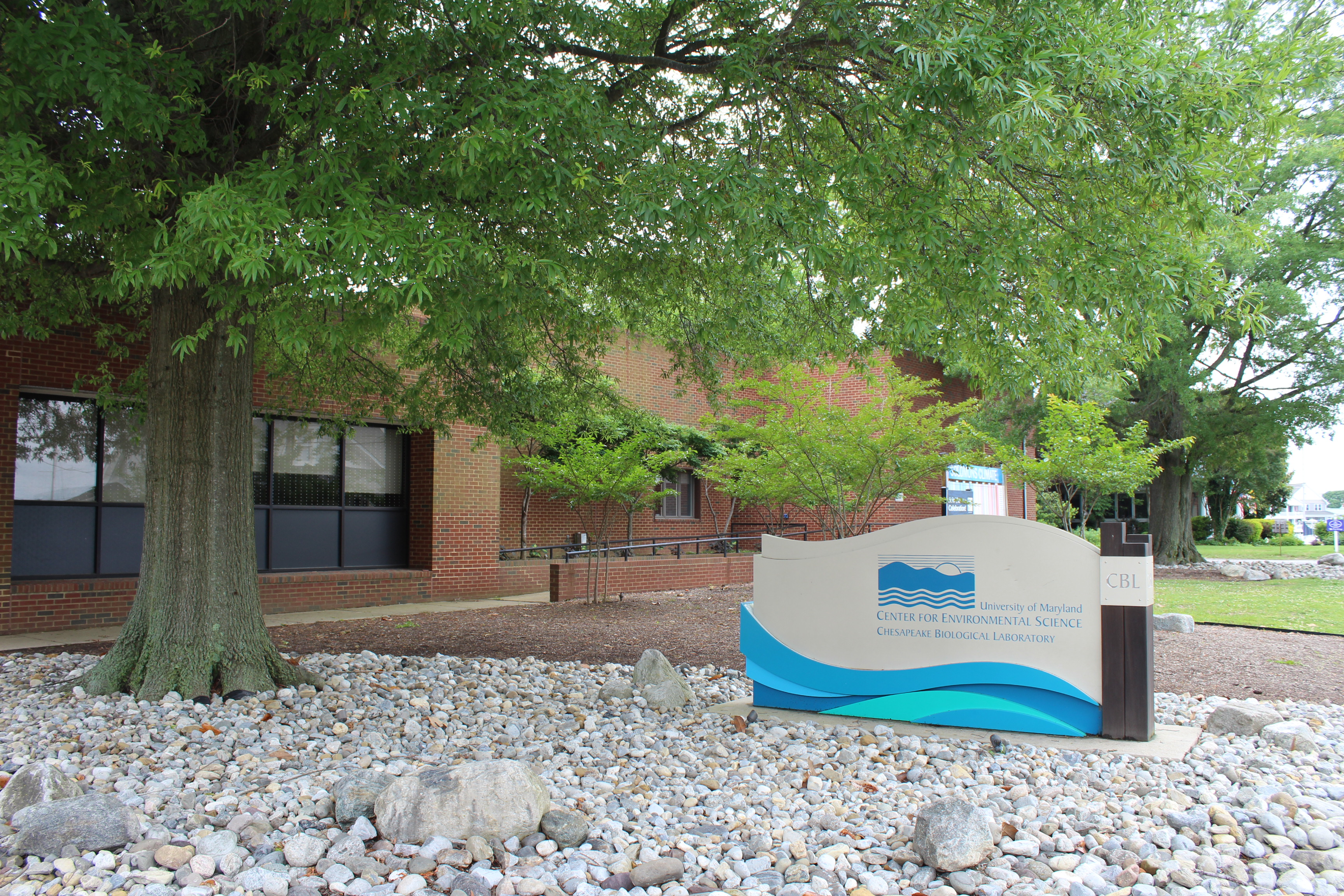
The Chesapeake Biological Laboratory in Solomons was founded in 1925.

=== 1900-1949 ===
- 1900 - The steamboat J.S. Warden begins to take passengers from Baltimore to Chesapeake Beach.
- 1903 - The McDonough Institute, the first high school in Charles County and predecessor to Maurice J. McDonough High School, opens.
- 1910 - The town of North Beach is incorporated.
- 1911 - The Digges Amendment, drafted by Charles County politicians Walter Digges and William J. Frere is rejected by Maryland voters. The amendment attempted to disenfranchise African American voters.
- 1916 October - Following the razing of the fourth Prince Frederick Courthouse, the fifth, and current courthouse completes construction.
- 1920 - WWI Memorial Statue designed by Edward Berge is erected in font of the Calvert County Courthouse. The statue lists names of fallen White soldiers separate from fallen Black soldiers.
- 1920 April 16 - The town of Indian Head is incorporated.
- 1922 - Central Industrial School opened in Prince Frederick as a multi-room school for African Americans in Calvert County.
- 1923 March 30 - Belvedere Hotel in Chesapeake Beach is destroyed in a fire.
- 1924 - St. Mark's Chapel is built in Deale.
- 1925 - Chesapeake Biological Laboratory begins operations in Solomons. R.V. Truitt serves as the facility's first director.
- 1926 - A tornado hits La Plata, destroying the La Plata Elementary School and killing thirteen school children.
- 1930 - Seaside Park opens in Chesapeake Beach.
- 1930's - Owings Eagles begin to play on Gray's Field.
- 1933 - Pomonkey High School opens as the first high School for African Americans in Charles County.
- 1933 August 23 - A storm hits Solomon's Island, destroying oyster beds and packing houses.
- 1934 - Wallville School ceases operations as a school.
- 1935 April 15 - The final train leaves the Chesapeake Beach Railway Station as Chesapeake Beach Railways closes down due to bankruptcy.
- 1937 - The Southern Maryland Electric Cooperative is established.
- 1937 December 27 - Calvert County agrees to equal pay for their African American school teachers following a suit from Harriet Elizabeth Brown and NAACP attorney Thurgood Marshall.
- 1939 - W. Sampson Brooks High School opens as the first high School for African Americans in Calvert County.
- 1940 December - Governor Harry W. Nice Memorial Bridge opens.
- 1941 - Riverside Airfield opens in Croom and becomes the first African American-owned and operated airfield in Maryland.
- 1942 June 11 - The Naval Amphibious Training Base Solomons is established. Railroad track originally laid by the Southern Maryland Railroad Company is purchased by the US Government with plans to extend the line to the base Naval Air Station Patuxent River.
- 1943 April 1 - Naval Air Station Patuxent River is commissioned.
- 1945 - Park Hall Airport opens in Lexington Park.
- 1949 - Slot machines are allowed by law in Calvert and Charles Counties.

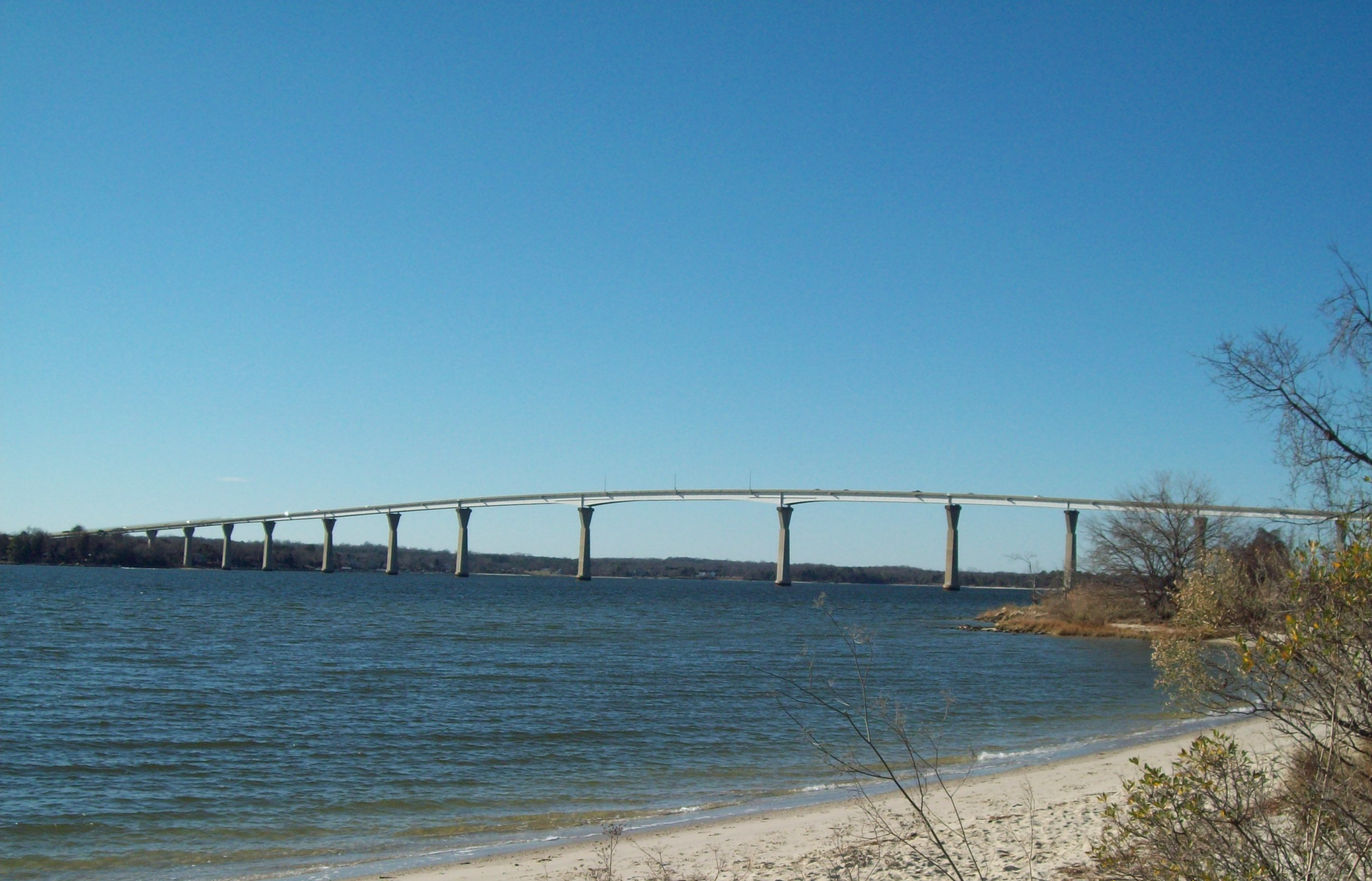
The Governor Thomas Johnson Memorial Bridge opens in 1977, connecting Solomons to Lexington Park.

=== 1950-1999 ===
- 1952 - Benedict Bridge opens and connects Calvert and Charles counties.
- 1952 July 30 - The first Chesapeake Bay Bridge in Annapolis completes construction.
- 1957 - John Hanson Highway completed.
- 1957 February 25 - Ryken High School opens.
- 1958 - Charles County Community College is established, hosting night classes at La Plata High School. This school will eventually become the College of Southern Maryland.
- 1961 - Piscataway Park is authorized by Congress.
- 1963 - Hattie Carroll, an African American barmaid, is murdered by William Zantzinger, a white Charles County landowner in Baltimore. Zantzinger received a light sentence, and the injustice became the focal point of a song by Bob Dylan.
- 1963 - Four Black students integrate Calvert High School.
- 1963 April 30 - Maryland state Legislation passed to abolish slot-machine gambling by 1968.
- 1963 December - Due to high levels of traffic on the Bay Bridge, a second span of the Chesapeake is proposed, including one that would have connected Calvert County and Dorchester County as part of the larger 1964 Chesapeake Bay crossing study. The second span would eventually be built very close to the first span.
- 1964 April 15 - Chesapeake Bay Bridge–Tunnel opens.
- 1964 July 19 - Moyaone is added to the National Register of Historic Places.
- 1964 December 6 - Tri-County Council for Southern Maryland is formed.
- 1966 - Charles County Public Schools begins the process of integration in high schools.
- 1966 April - First time Lower Marlboro Airport appears on the FAA Washington Sectional Chart.
- 1966 October 15 - Moyanone is designated a National Historic Location.
- 1968 - College of Southern Maryland La Plata Campus opens.
- 1969 - Student protests occur at La Plata High School over racial injustice.
- 1969 - Baltimore Gas and Electric begins construction on the Calvert Cliffs Nuclear Power Plant in Lusby.
- 1972 - Chesapeake Beach Amusement Park closes down.
- 1972 - The Moll Dyer Rock is moved to the Old Jail Museum in Leonardtown.
- 1973 - Maryland passes a state law that asserts marriage is between one man and one woman, becoming the first state to explicitly outlaw same-sex marriage.
- 1973 June 28 - The second span of the Chesapeake Bay Bridge in Annapolis is completed.
- 1974 March 31 - Billy Tayak, Turkey Tayac, and Avery Wind Rider file papers to incorporate the non-profit "Piscataway Conoy Indians Inc."
- 1975 May - The Calvert Cliffs Nuclear Power Plant begins operation.
- 1977 - Battle Creek Cyprus Swamp is leased to Calvert County as a public park.
- 1977 - Construction completed on the Governor Thomas Johnson Bridge.
- 1978 - Community College at St. Mary's County is established at Great Mills High School.
- 1979 - Following the passage of HB 5419, the remains of Turkey Tayac were moved from Cedar Hills Cemetery in Suitland to Piscataway Park.
- 1980 - Community College at Calvert County is established.
- 1981 - Steny Hoyer wins a special election to replace Gladys Spellman, who fell into a coma, in Maryland's 5th Congressional District. While representing Southern Maryland in Congress, Hoyer would go on to become House Majority Leader and House Minority Whip.
- 1981 September - St Mary's Ryken High School opens, a combination of St. Mary's Academy and Ryken High School.
- 1982 - Appointed to fill a vacancy on the Commissioner Board, Jesse Reid becomes the first African American to hold the office of County Commissioner in Calvert County.
- 1983 - Reverend Brian Scott founds the Gay and Lesbian Christian Fellowships and runs it out of his home in Waldorf.
- 1984 - Jefferson Patterson Park and Museum opens in St. Leonard.
- 1988 - Bernie Fowler holds the first "wade-in" in Broomes Island.
- 1989 - Park Hall Airport is not longer depicted on the FAA Washington Sectional Chart. The former runway has become "Spirtfire Court".
- 1990 March 30 - St. Charles Towne Center opens.
- 1992 - The Historic McConchie One-Room School that served African American students in Charles county, is moved to the Charles County Fairgrounds.
- 1993 - Francis and Anne Koenig donate their land in Dowell to Calvert County, the site would become Annmarie Gardens.
- 1994 September - A Tribute to the Oyster Tonger by Antonio Tobias Mendez is the first statue dedicated at Annmarie Gardens.
- 1997 - Leonardtown Campus of the College of Southern Maryland opens.

== 21st century ==
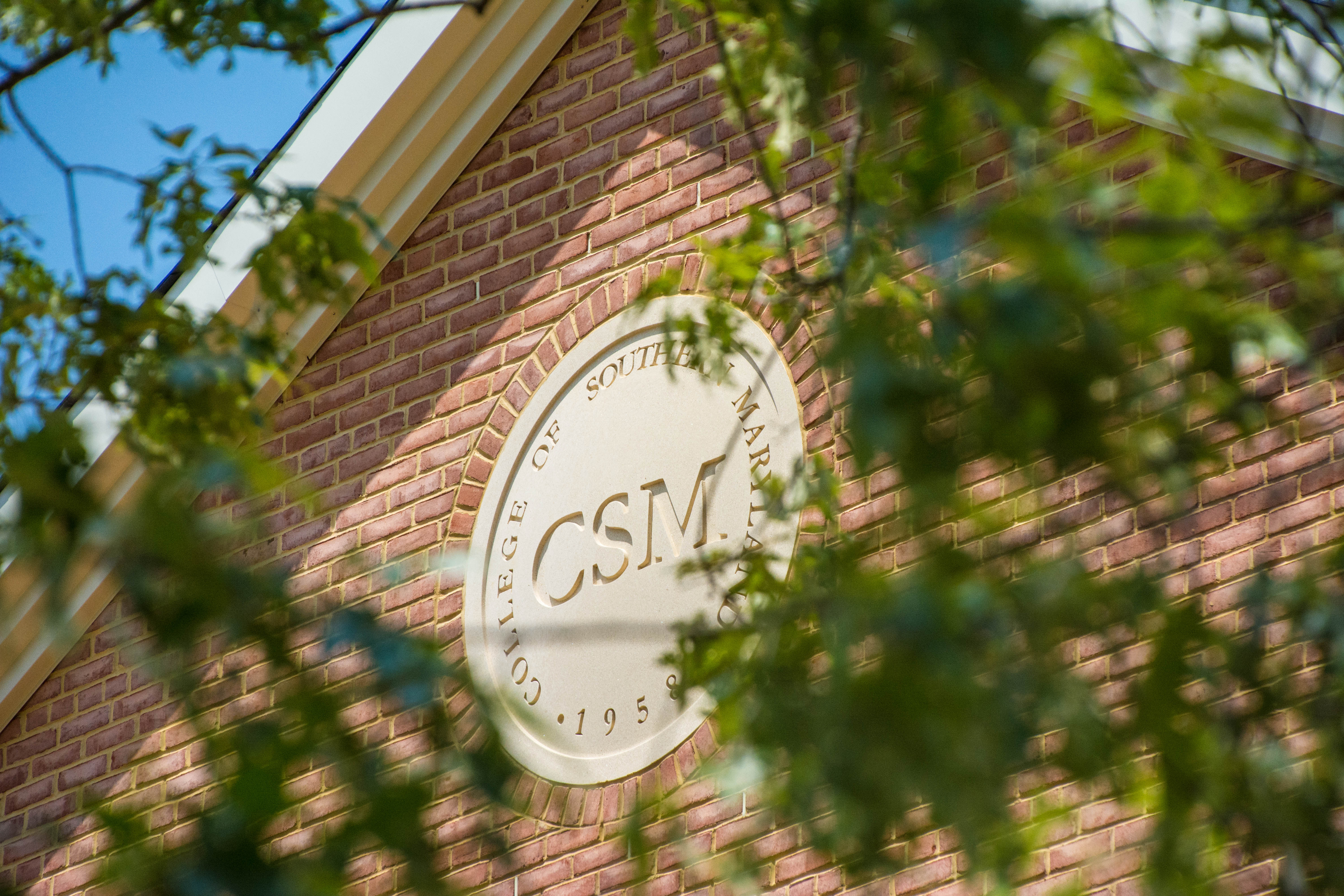
The community colleges in St. Mary's, Charles, and Calvert counties officially rebranded as the College of Southern Maryland in 2000.

- 2000 - The Southern Maryland Agricultural Development Commission (SMADC) is formed as part of the Tobacco Buyout.
- 2000 July 1 - the previously named "Charles Community College" is officially renamed the College of Southern Maryland.
- 2000 July 29 - An African American Monument is dedicated in Freedom Park.
- 2002 - The 2002 La Plata tornado hits Southern Maryland and the Eastern Shore, killing five and causing millions of dollars in damages.
- 2004 - Houses are built on the former Lower Marlboro Airport, with the runway becoming "Old Airpark Lane".
- 2004 - The Hunters Brooke arson occurs near Indian Head.
- 2005 - Prince Frederick campus of the College of Southern Maryland opens.
- 2005 June 23 - The 2005 Chesapeake Bay crossing study suggests two options for bridges connecting out of Calvert County, one connecting to Talbot County and one connecting to Dorchester county
- 2005 - North Point High School opens in Waldorf.
- 2006 - Salvageable portions of the building that housed Wallville School were moved to Calvert Elementary School.
- 2008 May 2 - Southern Maryland Blue Crabs host their first game at Regency Furniture Stadium.
- 2010 June 8 - Edward T. Hall Aquatic Center opens in Prince Frederick.
- 2011 June 22 - Southern Maryland Roller Derby is established in Waldorf.
- 2011 September - St. Mary's College of Maryland becomes one of the first campuses to ban the sale of Chick-fil-A because of the organization's financial ties to anti-gay groups.
- 2012 January 9 - The Piscataway become the first state recognized tribe in Maryland. They are still not federally recognized.
- 2014 August 18 - St. Charles High School opens in Waldorf.
- 2017 - CSM opens their Regional Hugesville campus.
- 2018 - Construction is completed on submarine communications cable connecting Cove Point to Taylor's Island.
- 2020 - According to the US census, at some point between 2010 and 2020, Charles County's largest racial group changed from being White to Black.
- 2021 February - The Moll Dyer Rock is relocated to Tudor hall in Leonardtown.
- 2021 September 13 - The Wellness & Aquatics Center in Leonardtown comes under the management of the St. Mary's Department of Recreation & Parks.
- 2023 January 3 - Dr. Yolanda Wilson becomes the first African American president at CSM.
- 2026 - After representing Southern Maryland in Congress for over four decades, former House Majority Leader and Minority Whip Steny Hoyer announces his retirement.
- 2026 November 3 - Adrian Boafo wins the 2026 House of Representatives election in the 5th congressional district, replacing Steny Hoyer.
