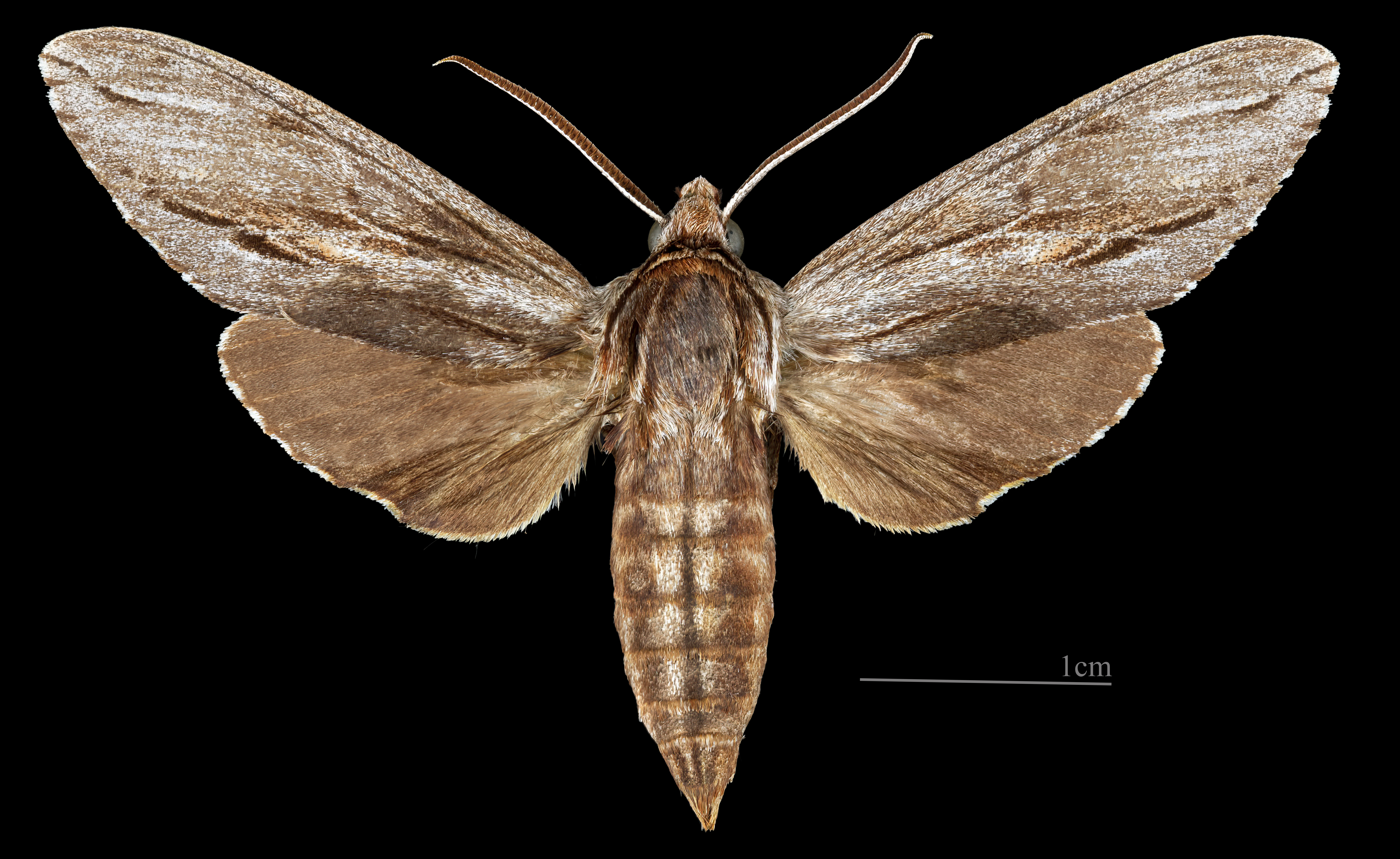
- Isoparce cupressi

Scientific classification
- Domain: Eukaryota
- Kingdom: Animalia
- Phylum: Arthropoda
- Class: Insecta
- Order: Lepidoptera
- Family: Sphingidae
- Tribe: Sphingini
- Genus: Isoparce; Rothschild & Jordan, 1903

= Isoparce =

Genus of moths

Isoparce is a genus of moths in the family Sphingidae. The genus was erected by Walter Rothschild and Karl Jordan in 1903.

== Species ==
- Isoparce cupressi (Boisduval, [1875])
- Isoparce broui Eitschberger, 2001
