= Moll Dyer =

Alleged witch in Maryland, US

Moll Dyer (c. 1697) is the name of a legendary 17th-century resident of Leonardtown, Maryland, who is said to have been accused of witchcraft and chased out of her home by the local townsfolk on a winter night. Her body was allegedly found a few days later, partially frozen to a large stone.

== History ==
The legend of Moll Dyer is an oral-history folktale that has been told in the region of St. Mary's County, Maryland for decades, if not centuries. Local legend keeps that Moll Dyer was a 17th-century colonist in Leonardtown, Maryland. Dates surrounding the origin of this folktale are hazy, but the consensus is that the events took place during a February in the late 1690s- during the Maryland Witch Trials that resulted in multiple acquittals and one recorded death. There are currently no known primary sources, census data, or otherwise firmly historical evidences to prove that the events of this legend occurred. Records of Leonardtown's colonial period are often considered incomplete, since many were lost in the fire that destroyed the town courthouse on 8 March, 1831.

Despite dubious sourcing, claims made to verify the story will often cite the following:

- Several immigration records show that Mary Dyer, Marg. Dyer, and Malligo Dyers were transported to Dorchester County, Maryland in October 1677 on a ship commanded by Capt. Thomas Taylor. (In the late 1600s, Moll was a nickname for Mary, along with any female name beginning with the letter "M".)
- A "great epidemic" occurred in Southern Maryland in 1697/98. (Archives of MD, V23, p. 396)
- In the 18 August 1892 edition of The St. Mary's Beacon (Edition 604, Volume LII), Joseph F. Morgan wrote that Moll lived in the area for many years, and that her cottage was burned while "Cotton Mather held sway in the land of the Puritans."
- There were several witchcraft trials in Maryland, starting in 1654 and continuing until 1712. Rebecca Fowler of neighboring Calvert County was hanged as a witch on 9 October, 1685.

In recent years, community efforts have attempted to revive the legend of Moll Dyer. Several links have been made, even by the St. Mary's County Government, to an allegedly real woman named Mary Dyer- who was possibly born in Devon, England in 1634 and first shows up in records in 1669, as an indentured servant in the Virgin Islands. In 1677, this same woman would travel by Capt. Thomas Taylor's ship to Dorchester, Maryland. It is unclear if this Mary Dyer ever resided or died in Leonardtown. These claims have been taken up and printed in several publications, including The Washington Post, though their veracity is up for debate.

In 2021, Leonardtown Mayor Dan Burris declared February 26 to be "Moll Dyer Day" as a tribute to the town's rich history.

== Folktale ==
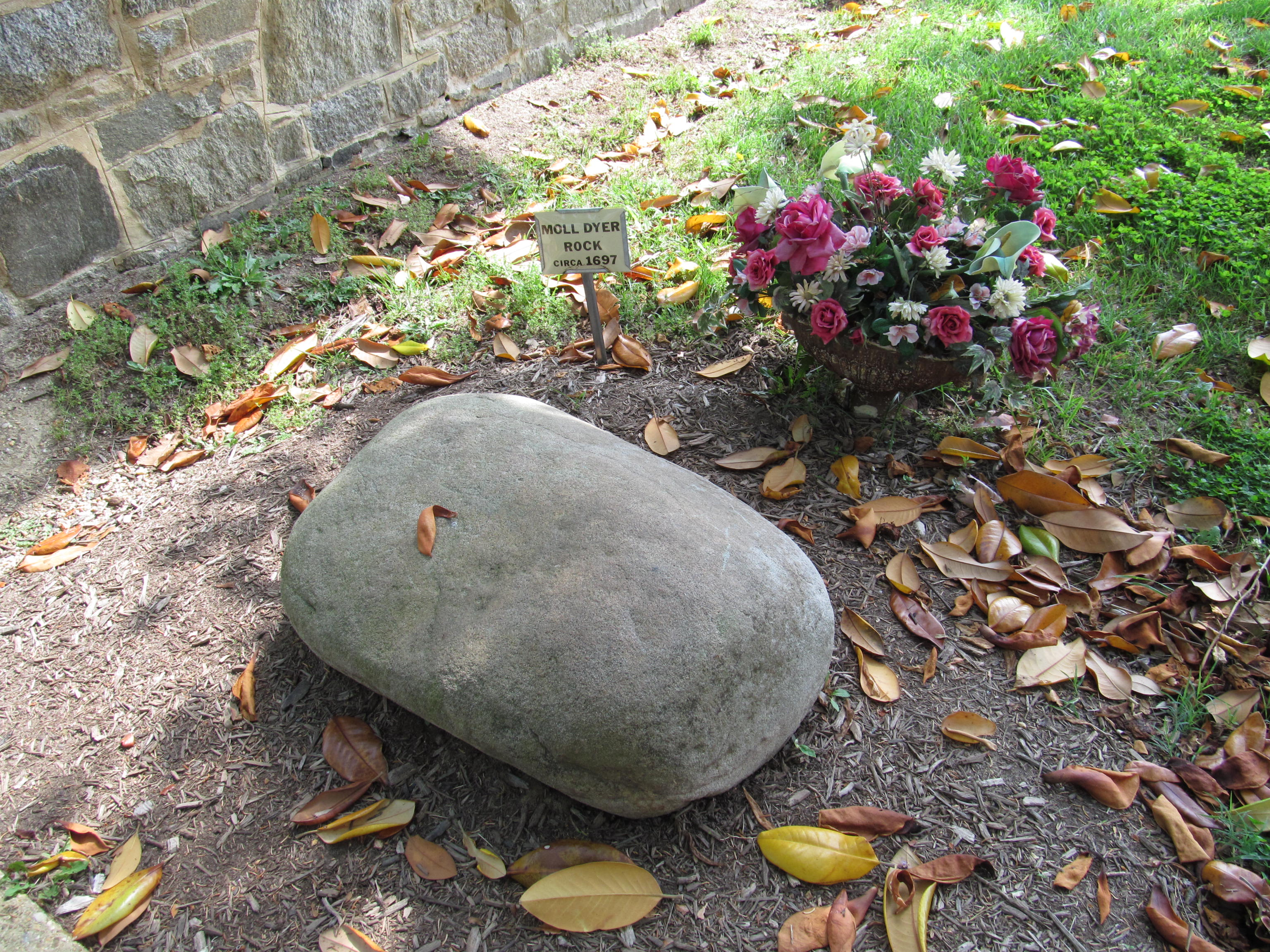
Moll Dyer's Rock on the Leonardtown courthouse lawn, May 2012.

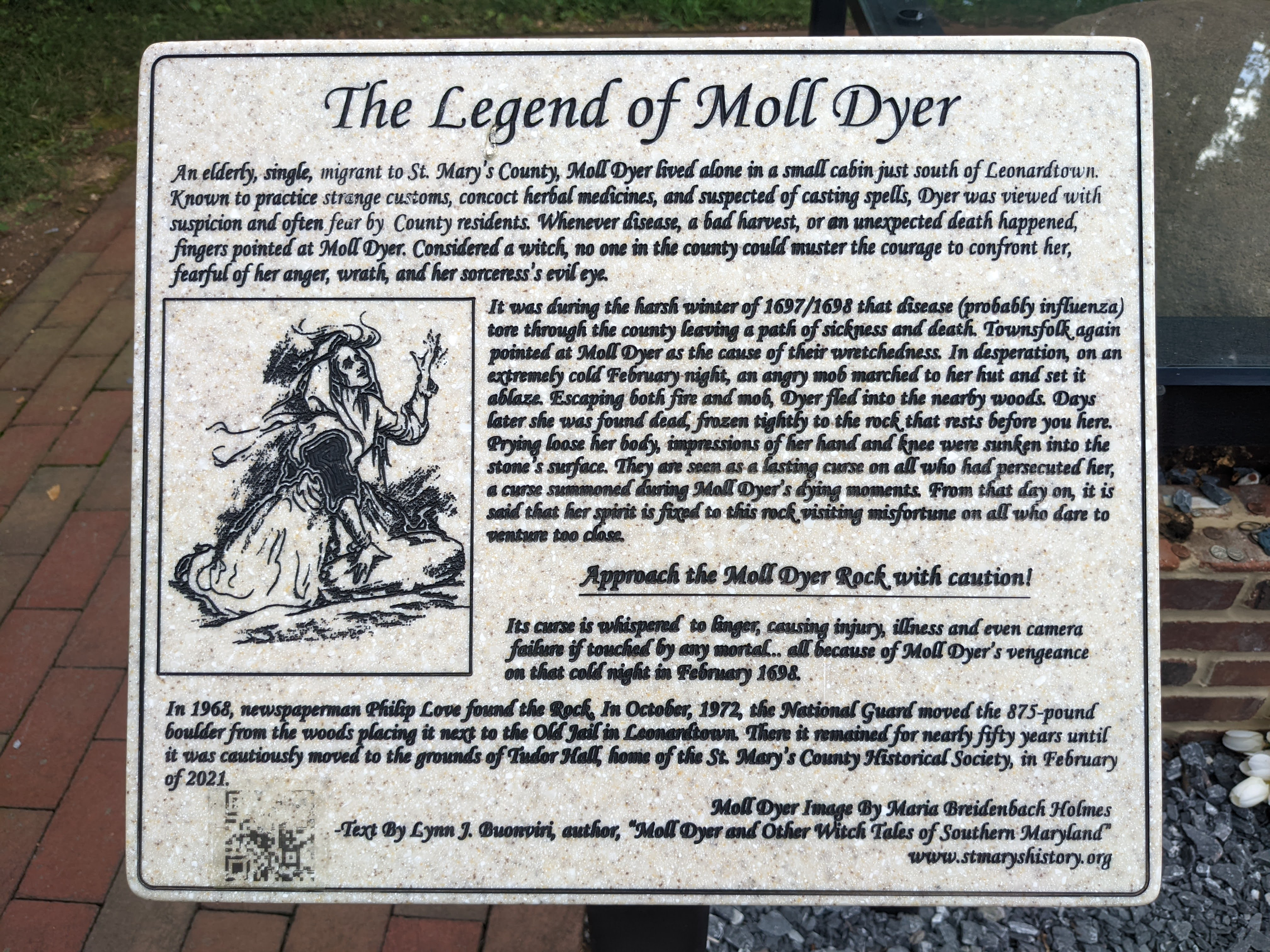
Informational sign at Moll Dyer's Rock, August 2022.

A deadly plague (likely influenza) and poor crops had taken their toll on the small Leonardtown community, and the particularly harsh winter meant that people were fearful of not making it through the season. A deeply religious community, the townsfolk turned to superstition, claiming that the famine, disease, and ice storms were the product of witchcraft.

A meeting in the local shop determined that Moll Dyer, an older woman who lived on the southern edge of town, was the witch in question; and had called upon the Devil to terrorize the people of Leonardtown. Events rapidly escalated and a mob was formed with the intent of running her out of town.

Upon arrival, the mob surrounded and set fire to her hut, with Moll barely managing to escape and run past the crowd into the woods. Some accounts claim Moll Dyer saw the mob approaching and fled quickly, with only enough time to grab a light shawl for warmth. Regardless of the telling, she runs for miles- until her legs finally give in.

Knowing she would die of exposure before sunrise, she found a small boulder and placed her right hand upon it. She then raised her left hand to the moon and called down a curse on the people of Leonardtown. Days later, her body was found frozen to the stone, with her hand still held up towards the sky.

The details of the curse are variable depending on the teller, but usually fall in the realm of blighted crops, infertility, child mortality, or familial misfortune.

Her spirit is said to still haunt the land surrounding Leonardtown, looking for the men who forced her from her home. It is also claimed that a handprint of discolored stone can occasionally be seen on the "Moll Dyer Rock" in front of the Tudor Hall Mansion.

Many supernatural events are reported near the modern-day Moll Dyer Road, a branch off of Maryland Route 5 that is claimed to be the site of either her residence or death. Reports of shadow people, will-o'-the-wisps, a white dog causing car accidents, "a thick, unnatural fog," and frequent lightning strikes are all common.

== Variations ==
As with all folktales, the story has been passed down through the generations and changes with the telling. In 1994 Thomas Jarboe conducted a series of interviews with ten local residents; including a member of the Dyer family, a local historian, and several people from families that have lived in the county since the 1600s.

According to these interviews, Moll Dyer may have come from England, Ireland, Virginia, Kentucky, New England, or Connecticut. She is said to have been a spinster, a widow, a woman scorned in love, or the mother of two sons. She may have been born as a Dyer or married a man named Dyer.

Two people said they had heard her name as "Moldy Dyer," and that she was a Native American (likely Chaptico) maid abandoned by her white lover after the birth of their child.

The date of her death varied from the mid-1600s to the late 1700s. As Leonardtown was established (as Seymour Town) in 1660, this would place her as a very early colonist, most likely English and Catholic. Several people said they thought she had come to Maryland because it was more religiously tolerant than other colonies. Since the Anglican Church was formed about a century prior and English Catholics often fled to the Americas to escape persecution, this aspect of the tale could be plausible.

== Moll Dyer's Rock ==
According to the legend, Moll Dyer rested on a large stone before she died, leaving indentations (either hands, knees, or both) behind. This rock was lost for centuries until 1968, when a writer for the Washington Evening Star, Philip H. Love, read about the legend in a local historical journal and sought to locate the rock. A grocer who lived nearby claimed to have known about the rock since he was a young boy, leading Love to the location.

In 1972, the 875-pound limestone boulder was moved by the National Guard from a wooded ravine near Moll Dyer Road to the Leonardtown courthouse lawn in front of the old 1876 jailhouse. A simple plaque near the rock read "Moll Dyer Rock, circa 1697."

The Moll Dyer Rock sat in this location for nearly 50 years, until early 2021, when the St. Mary's County Historical Society relocated the large stone to the grounds of Tudor Hall, where the Historical Society has its headquarters. Today, the rock sits under a plexiglass covering and has a more elaborate plaque detailing the events of the legend.

Touching the stone allegedly causes people to feel nauseous, dizzy, or otherwise deeply uncomfortable. It is also said to bring illness and misfortune to one's family.

Small offerings - flowers, sweets, trinket, mittens, etc.- are often left near the stone to nullify the effects of the curse.

== Popular culture ==
The Weather Channel aired an episode about Moll Dyer in their series American Supernatural on 5 October 2014.

Sister Witch, The Life of Moll Dyer was written by local novelist David W. Thompson and published by Solstice Publishing on October 31, 2017. Inspired by Moll Dyer's life, it pulls together the historical record and local oral traditions surrounding her legend.

Moll Dyer's Revenge, written by St. Mary's County native and author Mike Marcus, was published in the anthology From The Yonder: A Collection of Horror from Around the World in February 2020 from War Monkey Publications LLC.

The Legend of the Witch, Moll Dyer was choreographed by St. Mary's Ballet founder Jane Caputo and set to the music of Loreena McKennitt in 1999. The ballet was performed at St. Mary's Ryken High School and at the College of Southern Maryland's Leonardtown campus as part of the county's yearly Halloween celebration from 1999 to 2003 and again in 2006. The ballet recasts the legend in the mold of a morality tale of feminism and tolerance.

Moll Dyer was one of the historical figures that inspired the titular character in The Blair Witch Project.

The Washington Times has called her "perhaps Maryland's best-known bit of witch lore". Local newspapers occasionally reprint the story.

Moll Dyer Road, 3.4 miles south of Leonardtown, is named after her, as is the creek, Moll Dyer's Run, which parallels the road then crosses Route 5, goes past Our Lady's Chapel on Medley's Neck Road, and eventually flows into Breton Bay.

== Bibliography ==
- Thompson, David W. (2017). "Sister Witch: The Life of Moll Dyer". Solstice Publishing. ISBN 978-1973105756. found at https://www.amazon.com/gp/product/1973105756
- Matt Lake and Mark Moran, Weird Maryland, pp. 24–26 (2006 Sterling Publishing Co. Inc.), ISBN 1-4027-3906-0, found at Weird Maryland at Google Books. Accessed May 19, 2009.
- Hammett, Regina Combs (1977). History of St. Mary's County, Maryland. Ridge, Maryland.
- Pogue, Robert E. T. (1972). Old Maryland Landmarks. Bushwood, Maryland.
- Okonowicz, Ed (2007). Haunted Maryland: Ghosts and Strange Phenomena of the Old Line State. Stackpole Books. pp. 97–99. ISBN 9780811734097.
- Knight Jr., George Morgan (c. 1938). Intimate glimpses of old St. Mary's. Baltimore, Maryland: Meyer & Thalheimer. Archived from the original on 2011-07-27.
- David W. Thompson, "Haunted Southern Maryland" (2019 The History Press) ISBN 978-1467144490, found at https://www.amazon.com/gp/product/1467144495/
