= Rebecca Fowler =

Woman convicted and executed for witchcraft in 17th-century Maryland, US

Rebecca Fowler (died October 9, 1685) was a woman convicted and executed for witchcraft in 17th-century Maryland. Around a dozen witch trials were conducted in Maryland during the 17th and 18th centuries, with most being acquitted. Fowler is the only documented legal execution of an alleged witch in Maryland history.

== Life ==
Rebecca Fowler is believed to be the same Rebecca Logan who was transported from England to the Province of Maryland as an indentured servant in 1656. Logan was indentured to George Collins, a shoemaker and tobacco farmer. Once freed from her servitude, she married John Fowler, a fellow former indentured servant who had worked on the Collins slave plantation. The Fowler newlyweds purchased a parcel of land they named Fowler's Delight. The Fowlers became successful and eventually kept indentured servants of their own, including Francis Sandsbury. The evidence against Rebecca Fowler was not presented to the public during her witchcraft trial. Only Francis Sandsbury is named as an accuser, however, the court records mention "Several others" who were unnamed. Despite Rebecca's status as a landowner and Sandsbury's status as an indentured servant, the jurors believed Sandsbury's account. The jury stated its view that Fowler was guilty, but left the final determination of guilt to the judge.

The Prince George's County Court concluded that Rebecca Fowler, on or about August 31, 1685, "having not the feare of God before her eyes, but being led by the instigation of the Divell certain evill & dyabolicall Artes called witchcrafts inchantments charmes & sorceryes wickedly divelishly and feloniously at Mount Calvert ... & several other places ... did use practice & exercise in upon & against one Francis Sandsbury & Several others ... and their bodyes were very much the worse, consumed, pined & lamed ...." The judge ordered that Fowler be "hanged by the neck until dead." Fowler was executed by hanging on October 9, 1685, in St. Mary's City, Maryland. Mount Calvert is now maintained as the Mount Calvert Historical and Archaeological Park by the Maryland-National Capital Park and Planning Commission.

Despite being the only person legally executed as a witch by a Maryland court, several other women and one man were accused of being witches in Maryland history, some of whom were murdered. Other accused people included Mary Lee, Elizabeth Richardson, Elizabeth Bennet, John Cowman, and Hannah Richards. Moll Dyer may or may not have been an actual person. Lee and Richardson were both murdered at sea while on route to Maryland.

== Legacy ==
In October 2022, the Maryland State Library Agency produced a podcast titled "WitchesBrew", which discussed Rebecca Fowler and other accused witches in Maryland.

In 2025, a bill was introduced in the Maryland General Assembly to exonerate Fowler and all others who were convicted of witchcraft in colonial Maryland. Daniel Myrick, co-director of The Blair Witch Project, has endorsed the bill.

== See also ==
- Moll Dyer
- Witch trials in Maryland
