= Isoparce broui =

Scientific classification
- Kingdom: Animalia
- Phylum: Arthropoda
- Class: Insecta
- Order: Lepidoptera
- Family: Sphingidae
- Genus: Isoparce
- Species: I. broui

Binomial name
- Isoparce broui Eitschberger, 2001

Species of moth

Isoparce broui is a moth of the family Sphingidae. It is known from Mexico.
