= Battle Creek Cypress Swamp =

Protected area in Calvert County, Maryland, US

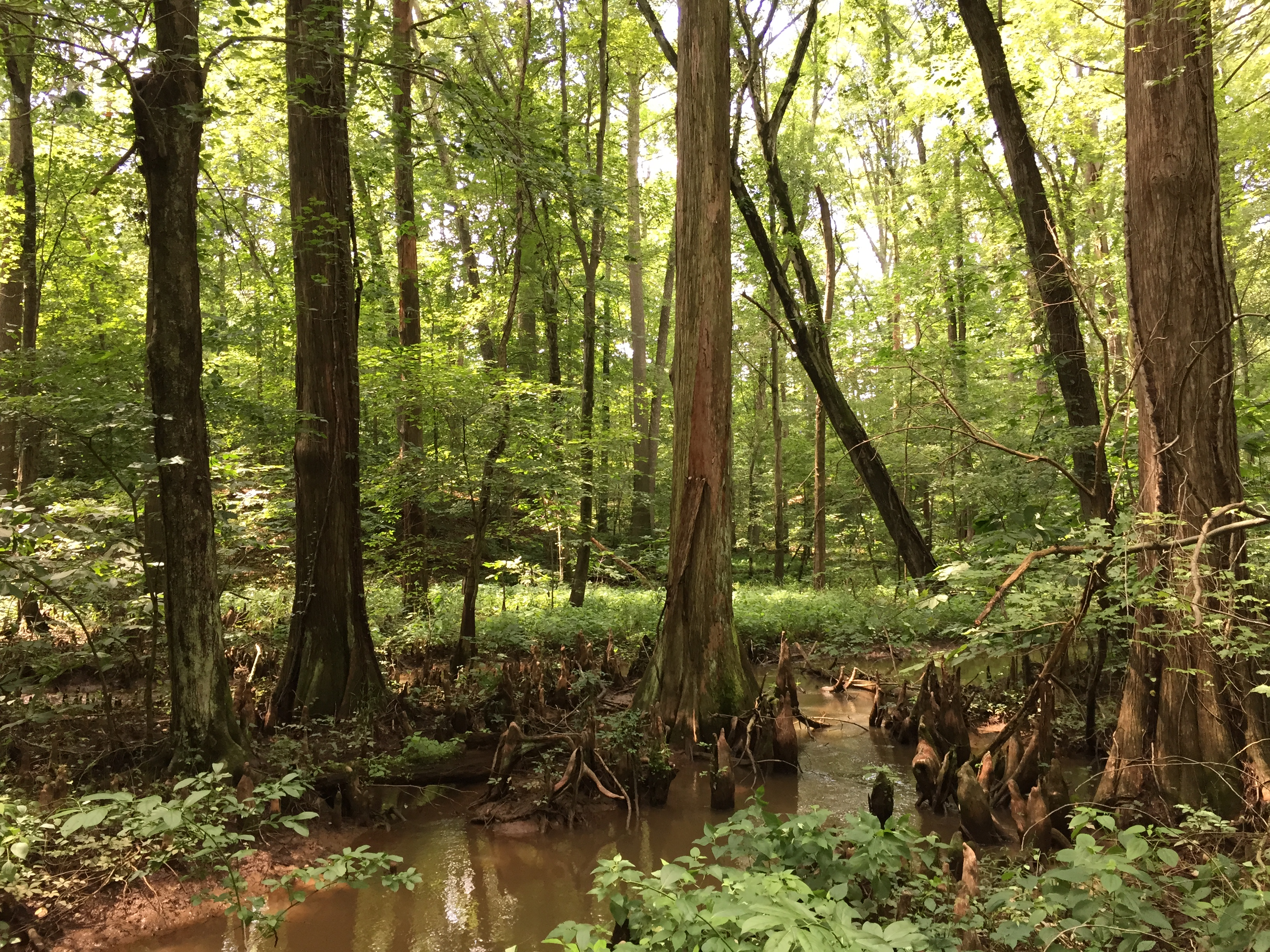

- Location within Maryland
- Location: Calvert County, Maryland
- Nearest city: Prince Frederick
- Coordinates: 38°29′40″N 76°35′39″W
- Area: 100 acres (40 ha)
- Established: 1957

U.S. National Natural Landmark
- Designated: 1965

Battle Creek Cypress Swamp (BCCS) is a forested wetland near Prince Frederick in Calvert County, Maryland, United States. It is one of the northernmost sites of naturally occurring bald cypress (Taxodium distichum) trees in North America, and the only large stand of the trees on the western shore of Maryland. In 1965, the National Park Service designated the BCCS a National Natural Landmark.

== The BCCS Sanctuary ==
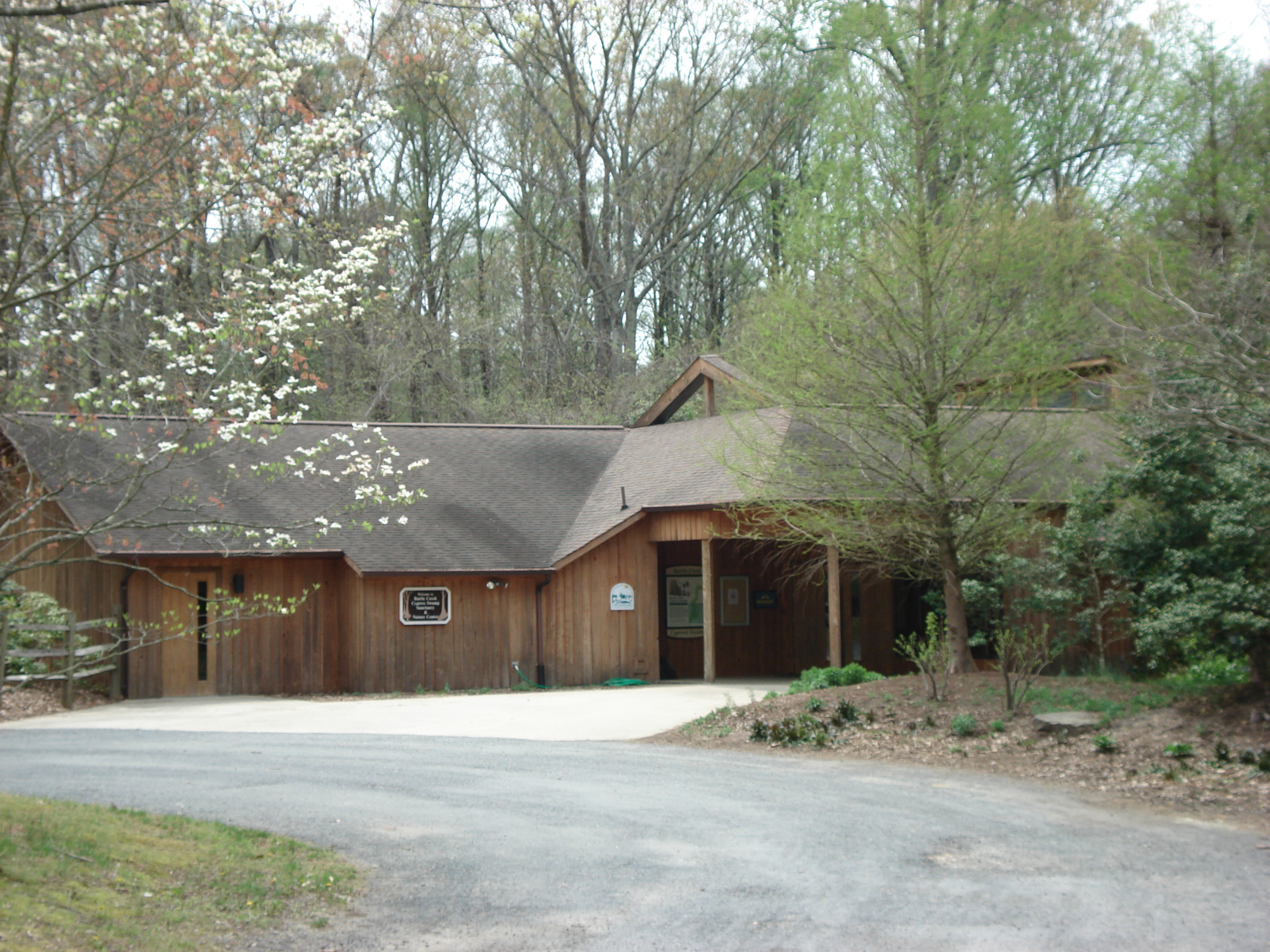
The Nature Center at BCCS

The Nature Conservancy purchased the wetland, which became the Battle Creek Cypress Swamp Sanctuary, in 1957. It was the Conservancy's first preserve in Maryland and encompasses 100 acres (40 ha) (about 1% of the 10,060-acre (40.7 km^{2}) watershed of Battle Creek). A portion of it is now open as a public park with a nature center and quarter-mile boardwalk through the swamp. Since 1977, the preserve has been leased to Calvert County and operated as a county park.

== Ecology ==
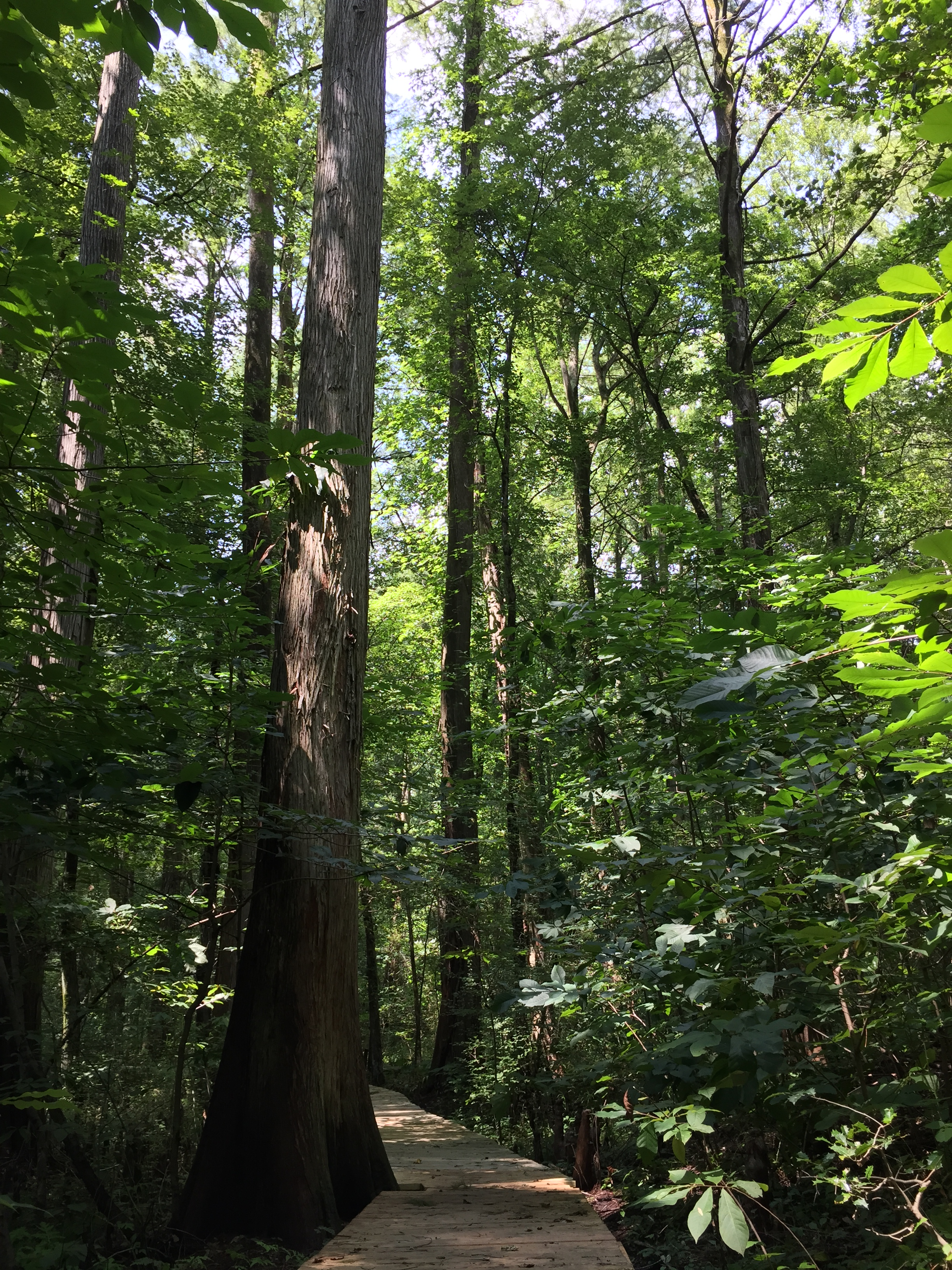
Trail through the swamp

Cypresses, such as the bald cypress, and their relatives once covered much of the northern temperate zone. It is thought that these trees disappeared from the BCCS area during the most recent Pleistocene glaciation ("Ice Age"), but reappeared around 5,000 to 10,000 years ago as the climate warmed.

In addition to the cypress, the sanctuary protects many songbirds (prothonotary warbler, waterthrush), frogs (green frog, spring peeper), insects such as Isoparce cupressi and several wildflower species cardinal flower, jack-in-the-pulpit, and red turtlehead . Skunk cabbages emerge early each spring.
