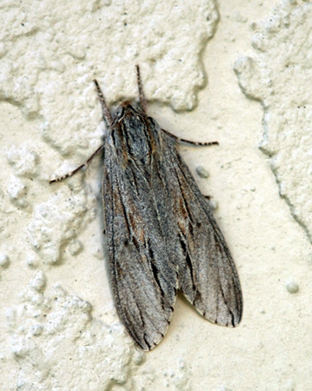

Scientific classification
- Kingdom: Animalia
- Phylum: Arthropoda
- Clade: Pancrustacea
- Class: Insecta
- Order: Lepidoptera
- Family: Sphingidae
- Genus: Isoparce
- Species: I. cupressi

Binomial name
- Isoparce cupressi (Boisduval, 1875)

Synonyms
- Sphinx cupressi Boisduval, 1875

= Isoparce cupressi =

Baldcypress sphinx

Species of moth

Isoparce cupressi, the baldcypress sphinx or cypress sphinx, is a moth of the family Sphingidae.

== Distribution ==
It is found in cypress swamps in from Maryland to Texas. It has been reported from Mexico.

== Description ==
The wingspan is 60–65 mm (2.4–2.6 in).

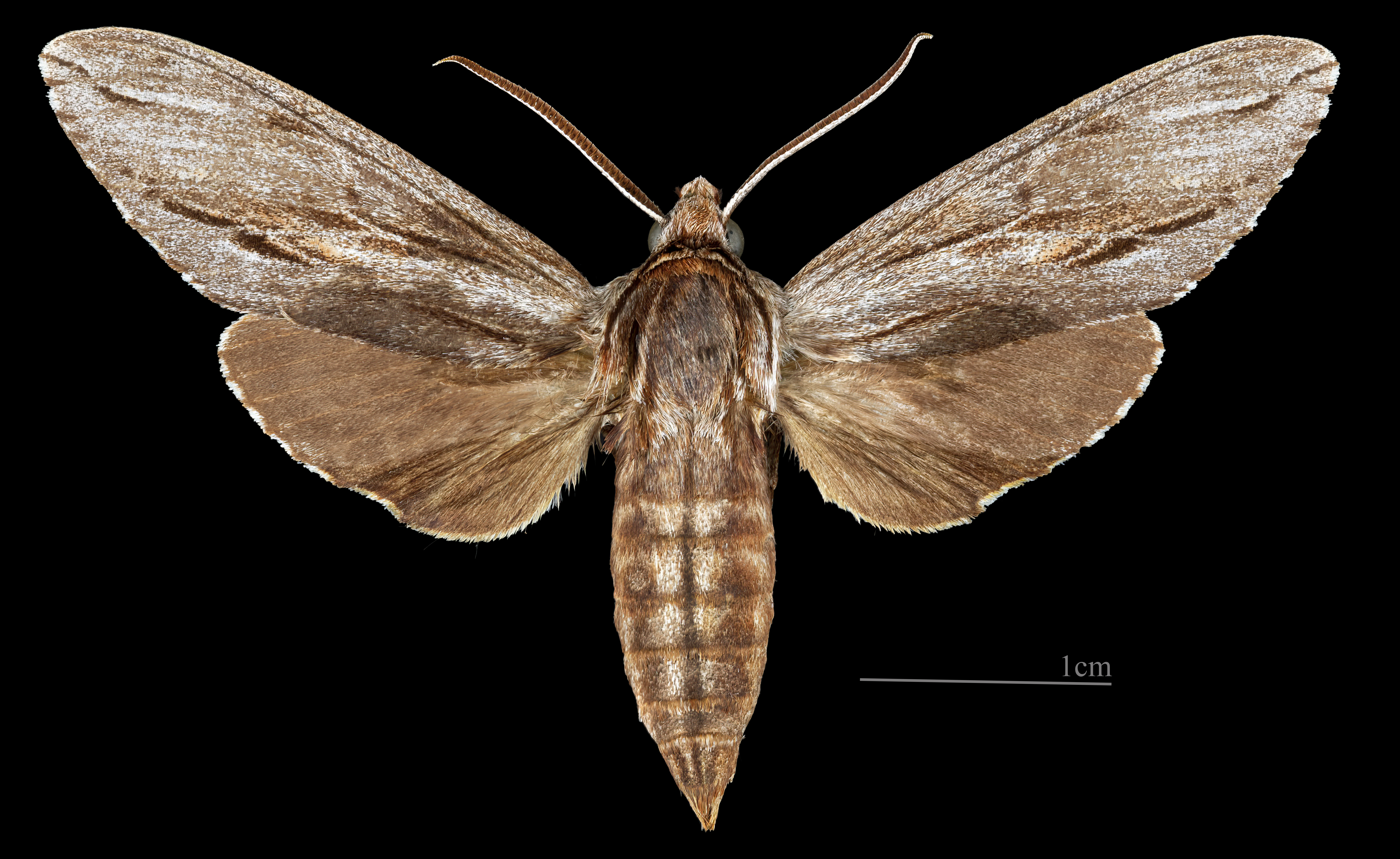
♂

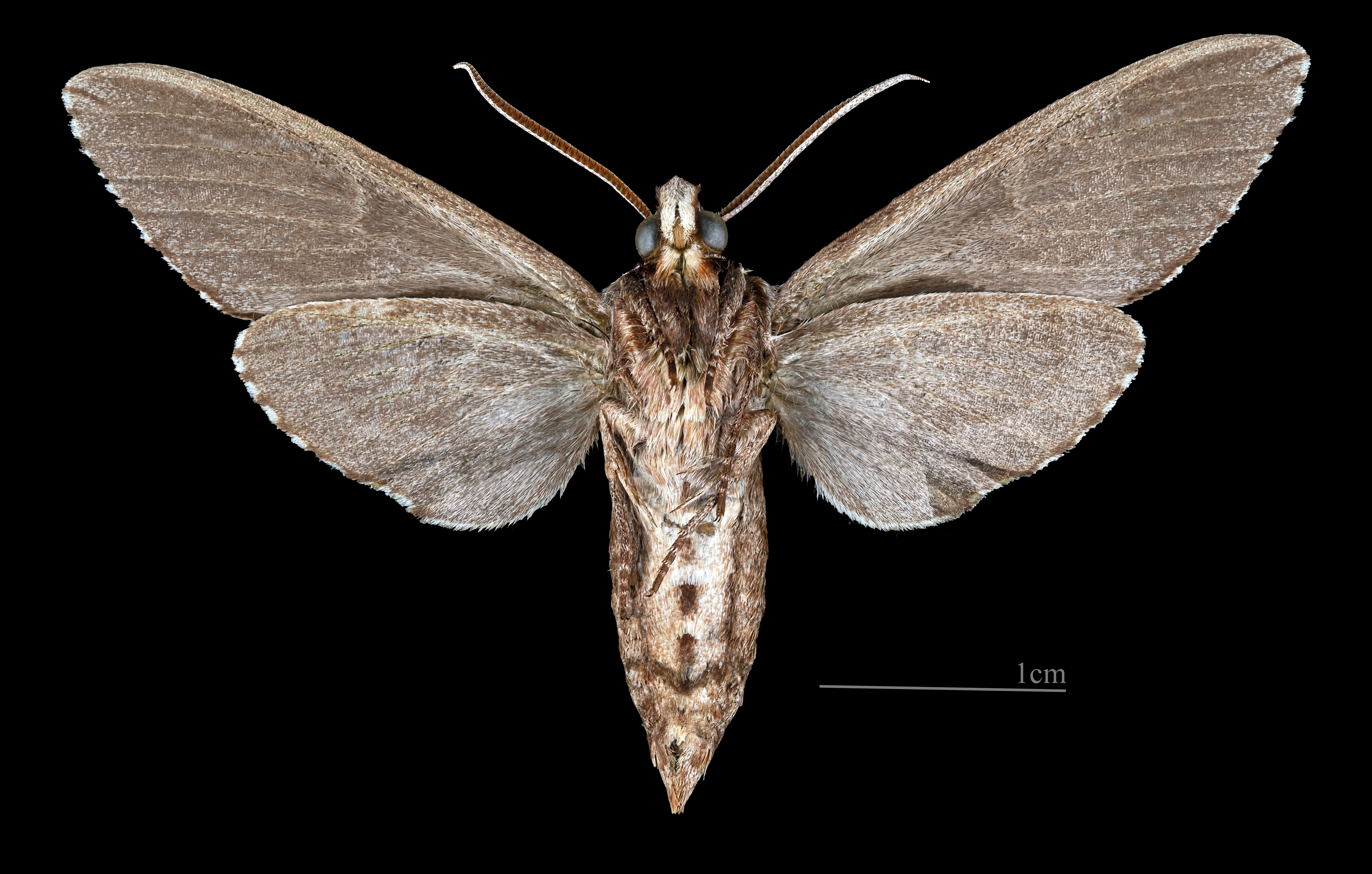
♂ △

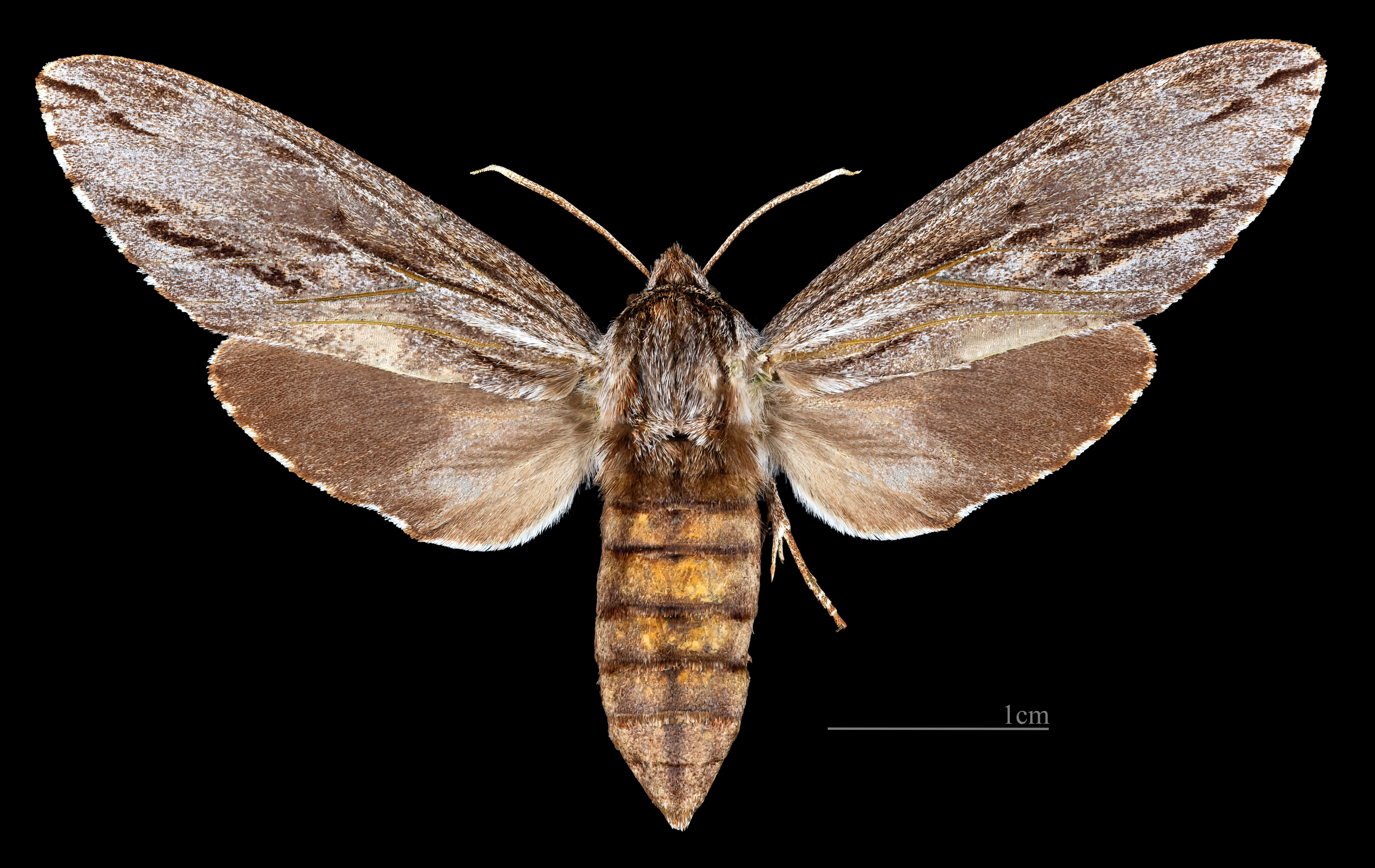
♀

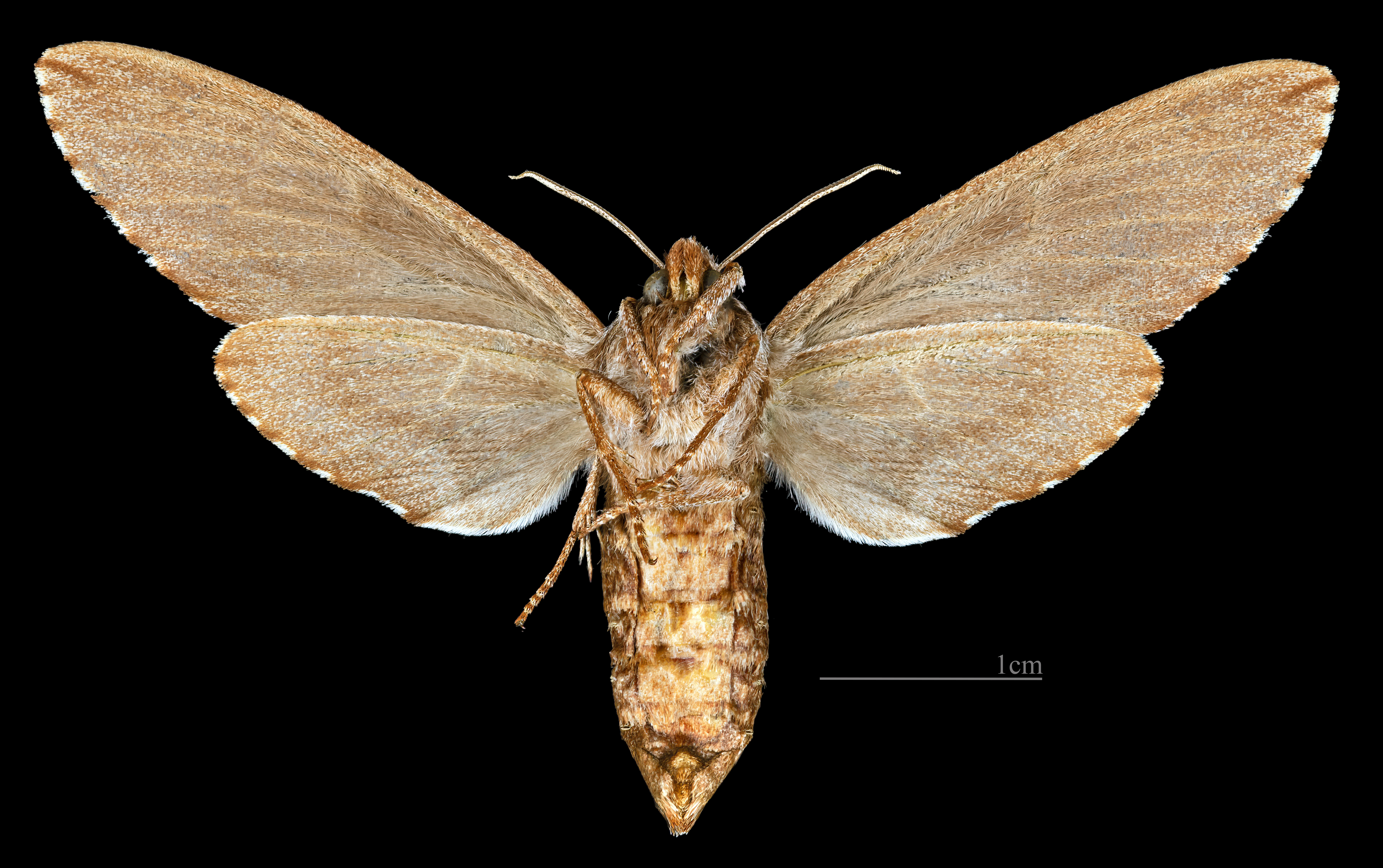
♀ △

Has an almost uniform brown colour on the upper surface of the wings, has two distinct parallel dark markings on the limbal area of the fore wings.

== Biology ==
There are at least four generations per year in Louisiana with adults on wing from February to October.
