= 2005 Chesapeake Bay crossing study =

Study to consider a new bridge across the Chesapeake Bay

The 2005 Chesapeake Bay crossing study (also known as the Task Force on Traffic Capacity Across the Chesapeake Bay) was a study conducted by the state of Maryland in 2005 in order to explore the possibility of building a new crossing of the Chesapeake Bay. The crossing would either be an entirely new crossing that would complement the existing Chesapeake Bay Bridge and Chesapeake Bay Bridge-Tunnel in Virginia or would be an upgrade to the current Maryland crossing (by adding a third span).

Since 2000, traffic congestion has become an increasing problem for the ageing Chesapeake Bay Bridge. During the MdTA's 2004 fiscal year (July 1–June 30), it was utilized by approximately 25.8 million vehicles. Plans by Maryland to construct a third crossing of the Chesapeake Bay are currently in the preliminary stages. During the summer and fall of 2005, a specially-appointed task force met to discuss the pros and cons of building a new bridge in four different locations. Members of the task force included Maryland Secretary of Transportation Robert L. Flanagan who chaired the task force, and Maryland State Senator E. J. Pipkin.

== Options ==
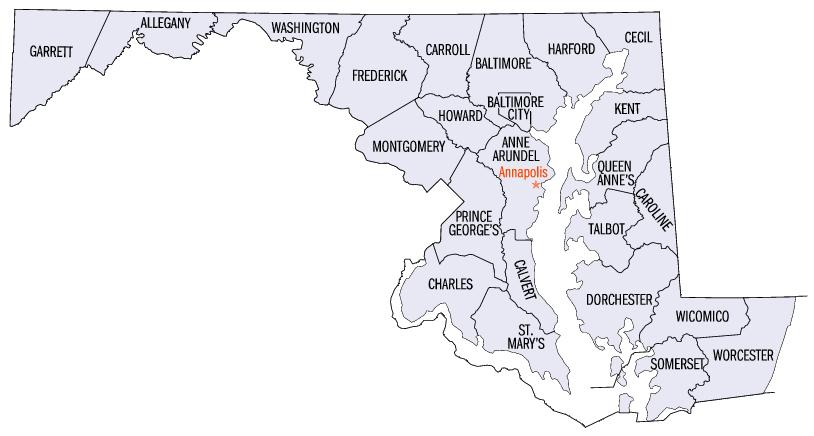
Map of counties in Maryland

Scenarios for the new bridge include a northern crossing between Baltimore and Kent Counties ("Zone 1"), adding a third bridge adjacent to the existing bridges ("Zone 2"), a crossing from Anne Arundel County or Calvert County to Talbot County ("Zone 3"), and a southern crossing between southern Calvert County and Dorchester County ("Zone 4").

=== Zone 1 ===
Roughly 50% of summer-weekend bridge traffic originates from Baltimore, and Baltimore accounts for 70% of non-summer weekday bridge traffic. In addition, the crossing will be across more shallow waters than the other crossings. The cons for building a bridge in such a location include the need to upgrade roads in Kent County as well as Kent County residents' concerns that historic towns in the county such as Chestertown would become suburbs of Baltimore.

=== Zone 2 ===
The plan for Zone 2 would have the existing crossing upgraded by adding a third span to it, thus increasing the capacity of US 50/301 across the bay. This option, the equivalent of which was chosen in the 1960s studies, would require the shortest bridge. However, in order to accommodate the higher capacity of the upgraded crossing (planned to be 10 lanes total), US 50/301 would have to be widened, which would be difficult mostly through Annapolis and Kent Island due to development near the highway.

=== Zone 3 ===
A new option explored during the 2000s studies was for a crossing from either Anne Arundel or Calvert County to Talbot County. This crossing would divert more traffic than the Zone 4 crossing while still providing a more direct connection between Ocean City, the most popular of the Eastern Shore resorts, and the Western Shore than the current crossing. Its major downfalls are that a series of small bridges would have to be built in Talbot County to serve the bridge, and the main bridge across the Chesapeake would be 10–12 miles (16–19 km) long, over twice as long as the existing crossing and comparable to the length of the Chesapeake Bay Bridge-Tunnel.

=== Zone 4 ===
The southern crossing, between Calvert and Dorchester Counties, would provide the most direct connection between Ocean City and the Western Shore. It has met with much opposition, however, due to environmental concerns that the approach roads on the Eastern Shore would be built on marshland. In addition, it would divert less traffic than the other crossings and, like the Zone 3 crossing, it would require the construction of small bridges on the Eastern Shore side. The total lengths of these bridges could be greater than the length of the main bridge itself.

== Other possibilities ==
In 2006 a hydrofoil ferry service between Baltimore and Rock Hall was proposed to begin by mid-2007; however, the service did not receive authorization from the Maryland General Assembly and therefore never came to fruition. Reasons the service was not seen as a viable option included the fact that a ferry would take longer to cross than a car driving over a bridge, and those seeking the path of least resistance when crossing would opt for using the bridge. Also, fees would be much higher with a ferry service to cross a car ($25 to $45) versus a bridge (current charge on existing bridge was $6.00 at the time). Estimates are that a ferry service would only be able to transport approximately 25,000 to 335,000 vehicle per year versus 24 million vehicles per year with a bridge. The task force concluded that a ferry service would not address the traffic congestion in a sufficient matter to be considered as a viable alternative, but may be a possible recreational feature for the bay. In early 2007, a private organization announced plans for a commuter ferry service that would directly link Kent Island with Baltimore and Annapolis. Unlike earlier proposals, the ferries would not carry vehicles, allowing them to carry more passengers than a vehicle-carrying ferry. Because of this, the ferries will connect with the local transit systems in Baltimore and Annapolis. Maryland governor Martin O'Malley has stated that he prefers a ferry over a new bridge. If any ferry service comes about, it would be the first major cross-bay ferry service in Maryland since the building of the Bay Bridge. Proposals have also been made for a new rail bridge rather than a highway bridge to cross the bay as part of a public transportation line.

== See also ==
- 1964 Chesapeake Bay crossing study
