= 1964 Chesapeake Bay crossing study =

The 1964 Chesapeake Bay crossing study was a study conducted by the state of Maryland in 1964 to explore the possibility of building another bridge across the Chesapeake Bay in addition to the existing Chesapeake Bay Bridge.

Three bridges were proposed as part of the study: a northern crossing between Baltimore and Kent Counties, a parallel span built next to the existing bridge, and a southern crossing between Calvert and Dorchester Counties. The crossings were authorized by the Maryland General Assembly in 1967 and the parallel span was completed in 1973. Proposals to build the other two bridges remained active until the 1970s; however, neither bridge was ever built.

== See also ==
- 2005 Chesapeake Bay crossing study
