= Witch trials in Maryland =

Prosecutions in Colonial Maryland, 1654–1712

The Maryland Witch Trials were a series of hearings and prosecutions of people accused of witchcraft in Colonial Maryland between June 1654, and October 1712. It was not unique, but is a Colonial American example of the much broader phenomenon of witch trials in the early modern period, which took place also in Europe.

Colonial Maryland had a unique relationship to Christianity. The Calvert family established Maryland as a safe-haven for Catholic refugees from Europe and insisted on the need for the Maryland Toleration Act. Enacted in 1641, the act protected the Catholics from prosecution. But as the century went on, Puritan immigration displaced the Catholics and turned Maryland overwhelmingly Protestant. From 1644 to the 1670s, a series of religious conflicts in the colony eventually lead to the Protestant Revolution, and as a result Catholicism was made illegal in the province, and Puritans took control of the Maryland government. This provides some additional context to the political system in the province as the witch trials progressed.

Along with the Maryland Witch Trials, the Connecticut Witch Trials which had started in 1647, and the Salem witch trials in 1692, were the first executions in the United States for witchcraft in the 17th century.

== Background ==
The documented history of witchcraft in Maryland dates back to June 1654. The ship 'Charity of London', arrived to St. Mary's City where the death of passenger Mary Lee was reported to the officials. Through testimonies held on June 23, 1654, it is revealed that Mary Lee was executed for being a witch three weeks prior to arriving. Word of her being a witch spread through the colony, resulting in various civil suits of slander.

In 1657, another woman on a ship bound for the colonies was executed as a witch. Her name was Elizabeth Richardson, and her death would go on to result in lawsuit brought forth by John Washington, great-grandfather of George Washington, against Captain Edward Prescott for her death.

In the later part of the 17th century criminal trials of witchcraft became more prevalent. In 1674, John Cowman marked the first judicial conviction of witchcraft by a Maryland court. Judicial witch trials lasted until 1712, when Virtue Violl was accused and found not-guilty. Historian Francis Neal Parke believed that the jury held a similar belief to that echoed by Joseph Addison in The Spectator from 1711.

I believe in general that there is and has been such a thing as Witchcraft; but at the same time can give no credit to any particular instance of it.

— Joseph Addison, The Spectator (1711)

In 1810, Chancellor William Kilty gave a report to the General Assembly, he was convinced that the statute of James I had been in use in the province.

== Accusations and executions ==
=== Mary Lee ===
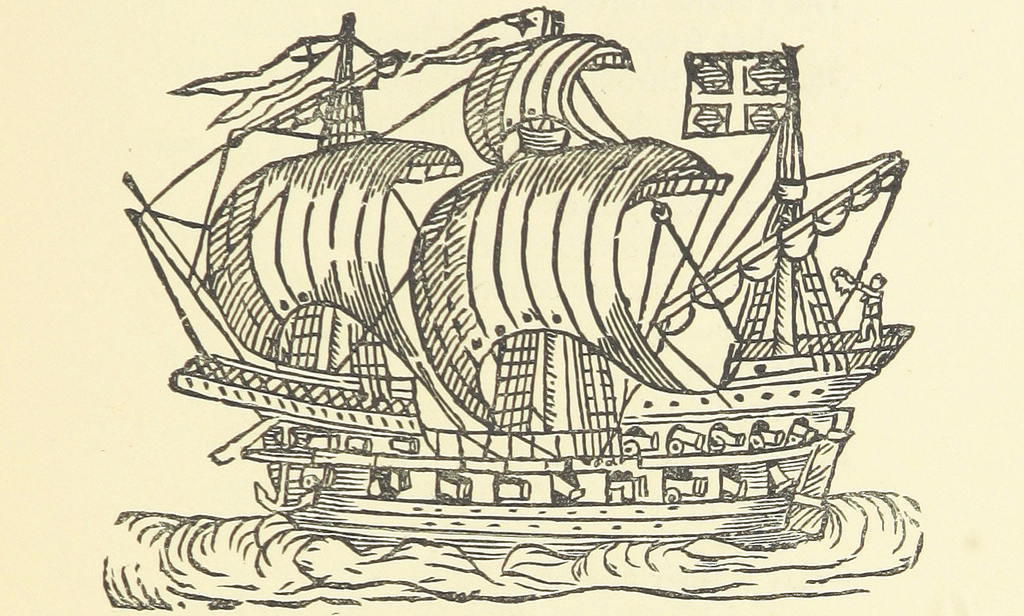
A woodcarving depicting the Charity of London circa 1606.

The earliest surviving documentation of witchcraft in the colony of Maryland dates back to the June 23, 1654 depositions of Captain John Bosworth, captain of the 'Charity of London', Henry Corbyn, a young merchant from London, and Francis Darby, a gentleman who was a passenger on the ship. In front of William Stone they detailed the ship's departure from Europe for St. Mary's City, Maryland, and described Mary Lee's conviction of witchcraft and execution. While at sea, a rumor spread amongst the sailors that passenger Mary Lee was a witch. Captain Bosworth initially refused to try Mary Lee, but eventually relented. Bosworth expressed interest in dropping her off in Bermuda, but cross winds prevented it. Mary Lee was captured by sailors, her body was searched for the Witch's mark, when they were satisfied they found the mark Captain Bosworth was called to examine it. According to testimonies Mary Lee confessed she was a witch. Captain Bosworth was unwilling to sentence her to death, and retired to his cabin. Francis Darby, who helped search Mary Lee's body, recalled how she was hanged by the sailors.

The Charity of London, would go on to be seized by the British in 1681.

=== Richard Manship's wife ===
Word of Mary Lee's execution spread through the colony, as proof of witches in Maryland. At Peter Godson's plantation, Richard Manship confronted Peter and his wife about rumors they had been spreading claiming Richard Manship's wife was a witch. Richard demanded Peter support his claims that Mrs. Manship was a witch. Peter claimed Mrs. Manship in a "jesting way said, they Say I am a witch." On another evening John Killey, a 25-year-old, claimed that at the house of Phillip Hide, Richard asked Peter to prove his wife was a witch again. The conflict escalated and a case of slander was brought to the Provincial Court on October 16, 1654. It was determined that Peter Godson and his wife had defamed Richard Manship's wife in saying she was a witch in addition to other slanderous speech against her. Speaker Richard Preston required Peter Godson and his wife apologize, and were ordered to pay damages.

=== Elizabeth Bennett ===
In October 1665, Elizabeth Bennett was brought before the Provincial Court in Saint Mary's County. Bennett was charged with Witchcraft, Burglary, Murder and Trespassing. On October 11, 1665, the court, presided over by Phillip Calvert, determined the case against Elizabeth Bennett, was "...not presentable," and on October 16, she was, "...cleared by proclamation."

=== John Cowman ===
John Cowman was the first judicial conviction under the Statute of James I witchcraft, conjuration, sorcery or enchantment upon the body of Elizabeth Goodale, and sentenced to be hanged. He was saved by the intercession of the deputies and delegates of the Lower House of the General Assembly, who petitioned Charles Calvert, the Lieutenant General and the Chief Judge of the Provincial Court for clemency. The Upper House on February 17, 1674, granted the reprieve.

=== Rebecca Fowler ===
On September 30, Rebecca Fowler was tried by the provincial court of St. Mary's County. The widowed Rebecca was accused of performing witchcraft at Mount Calvert Hundred among other places in Calvert County. She was accused of using magic to harm Francis Sandsbury, in addition to other residents. She was indicted, and pled not guilty. Attorney General Thomas Burford declared her guilty and sentenced her to hanging until death. She was hanged on October 9, 1685.

Rebecca was the only person legally executed as a witch by a Maryland court.

=== Hannah Edwards ===
On April 29, 1686, Hannah Edwards was brought to the court in St. Mary's County. Her husband Richard Edwards, a planter, had died prior making her a widow. Starting February 6, 1685, Hannah was accused of using witchcraft, enchantments, and charms, against Ruth Hutchinson. It was claimed Ruth was consumed, and pined for by Hannah. Edwards was indicted and pled not guilty. She was later found not guilty.

=== Virtue Violl ===
On October 5, 1712, the provincial court met in Annapolis, Maryland with justice Thomas Smithson presiding. Sheriff Foster Turbutt of Talbott County brought Virtue Violl to the Sheriff of Anne Arundel County to face the court. Virtue, a spinster, was accused of using witchcraft starting August 19, against Elinor Moore (also documented as Ellianor Moore) who was rendered speechless. Virtue pled not guilty to the charges. On October 17, 1712, Virtue Violl was found not guilty, based on the testimonies of the witnesses.

=== Moll Dyer ===
Legend says Moll Dyer was accused of being a witch, and was banished from Leonardtown, Maryland. She was later found dead, frozen to a rock in the forest.

Due to fires in both St. Mary's County and Calvert County archives in 1831, no legal records exist verifying the story of Moll Dyer.

== In media ==
The conviction and execution of Moll Dyer went on to be used for the backstory for the Blair Witch franchise's fictional Maryland witch 'Elly Kedward'.

== Exoneration efforts ==
In 2025, a bill was introduced in the Maryland General Assembly to exonerate those who were convicted of witchcraft in colonial Maryland. Daniel Myrick, co-director of The Blair Witch Project, has endorsed the bill.

== See also ==
- List of people executed for witchcraft
- List of people of the Salem witch trials
- Modern witch-hunts
- Protestant Revolution (Maryland)
- Salem witchcraft trial (1878)
- Witchcraft and children
- Witch trials in the Early Modern period

=== General ===
- Colonial history of the United States
- Hanging in the United States
- List of wrongful convictions in the United States
- Moral panic
