= Temple Hills–Marlow Heights Line =

Daily bus route in Washington, D.C. area

H12
- Temple Hills-Marlow Heights Line

Overview
- System: Metrobus
- Operator: Washington Metropolitan Area Transit Authority
- Garage: Andrews Federal Center
- Livery: Local
- Status: Discontinued
- Began service: 1939
- Ended service: June 29, 2025

Route
- Locale: Prince George's County
- Communities served: Hillcrest Heights, Silver Hill, Marlow Heights, Temple Hills
- Landmarks served: Naylor Road station, Iverson Mall, Hillcrest Heights, Marlow Heights Shopping Center, Temple Hills, Heather Hills Apartments
- Start: Naylor Road station
- Via: Fisher Road, Temple Hill Road, St. Barnabas Road, Branch Avenue
- End: Temple Hills (Heather Hill Apartment Complex)
- Length: 25-30 minutes

Service
- Level: Daily
- Frequency: 35 Minutes
- Weekend frequency: 60 minutes
- Journey time: 30 minutes
- Operates: 4:50 AM - 12:40 AM (Weekdays); 6:19 AM - 11:20 PM (Saturdays); 7:50 AM - 9:22 PM (Sundays)
- Ridership: 248,333 (FY 2024)
- Transfers: SmarTrip only
- Timetable: Temple Hills-Marlow Heights Line

The Temple Hills–Marlow Heights Line, designated Route H12, was a daily bus route operated by the Washington Metropolitan Area Transit Authority between Naylor Road station of the Green Line of the Washington Metro and Heather Hill Apartment Complex in Temple Hills, Maryland, via the Iverson Mall and the Marlow Heights Shopping Center. The line operated 35 minutes Monday-Friday and 60 minutes on weekends. Trips were roughly 30 minutes long. The route was discontinued during WMATA's Better Bus Redesign in June 2025.

== Background ==
Route H12 operated between Naylor Road station and Heather Hills Apartment Complex in Temple Hills, Maryland mostly along Fisher Road, Temple Hills Road, St. Barnabas Road, and Branch Avenue connecting Hillcrest Heights, Silver Hill, Marlow Heights, and Temple Hills.

Route H12 operated out of Andrews Federal Center division since June 23, 2019. It formerly operated out of Landover and Southern Avenue divisions at one point.

=== H12 Stops ===
Bus stop	Direction	Connections
Prince George's County, Maryland
Naylor Road station Bus Bay D	Southbound stop, Northbound terminal	Metrobus: 36, C12, C14, F14; TheBus: 32; Washington Metro:
Branch Avenue / Curtis Drive	Bidirectional	Metrobus: C12, C14
Branch Avenue / Bonita Street	Northbound	Metrobus: C12, C14
Branch Avenue / 32nd Avenue	Southbound	Metrobus: C12, C14
Branch Avenue / Colebrooke Drive	Bidirectional	Metrobus: C12, C14; TheBus: 32
Colebrooke Drive / Fairlawn Avenue	Bidirectional	Metrobus: C12, C14; TheBus: 32
Colebrooke Drive / Gaither Street	Southbound	
Colebrooke Drive / 28th Parkway	Bidirectional	
Colebrooke Drive / 26th Avenue	Northbound	
26th Avenue / Colebrooke Drive	Southbound	
Iverson Street / 26th Avenue	Southbound	Metrobus: C12, P12
25th Avenue / Iverson Street	Northbound	Metrobus: C12, P12
Colebrooke Drive / 25th Avenue	Northbound	
Iverson Street / 25th Avenue	Southbound	Metrobus: C12, P12
Iverson Street / 24th Avenue	Bidirectional	Metrobus: C12, P12
Iverson Street / 23rd Place	Bidirectional	Metrobus: C12, P12
Iverson Street / 23rd Parkway	Bidirectional	Metrobus: C12, P12
23rd Parkway / Jameson Street	Bidirectional	
23rd Parkway / 22nd Place	Southbound	
23rd Parkway / Kenton Place	Northbound	
23rd Parkway / Kirby Drive	Bidirectional	
Lyons Street / Olson Street	Bidirectional	
St. Clair Drive / Lyons Street	Bidirectional	
St. Clair Drive / Murdock Street	Northbound	
St. Clair Drive / Norcross Street	Bidirectional	
St. Clair Drive / 27th Avenue	Northbound	
St. Clair Drive / Olson Street	Southbound	
St. Clair Drive / 28th Avenue	Southbound	Metrobus: D12; TheBus: 32
28th Avenue / St. Clair Drive	Northbound	Metrobus: D12; TheBus: 32
28th Avenue / Keith Street	Bidirectional	Metrobus: D12; TheBus: 32
Keith Street / Triton Court	Bidirectional	Metrobus: D12
Marlow Heights Shopping Center / #3927	Southbound	Metrobus: C12, C14, D12
Marlow Heights Shopping Center / Macy's	Bidirectional	Metrobus: C12, C14, D12
Marlow Heights Shopping Center / 28th Avenue	Bidirectional	Metrobus: C12, C14, D12
St. Barnabas Road / 28th Avenue	Southbound	Metrobus: D12
St. Barnabas Road / Leisure Drive	Southbound	Metrobus: D12
St. Barnabas Road / Holly Tree Road	Northbound	Metrobus: D12
St. Barnabas Road / Stamp Road	Bidirectional	Metrobus: D12
St. Barnabas Road / Clifton Road	Bidirectional	Metrobus: D12
St. Barnabas Road / Pohanka Place	Bidirectional	Metrobus: D12
Temple Hill Road / St. Barnabas Road	Southbound	Metrobus: D12; TheBus: 32, 33
Temple Hill Road / Carlton Avenue	Northbound	Metrobus: D12; TheBus: 32, 33
Temple Hill Road / Rickey Avenue	Bidirectional	TheBus: 32, 33
Temple Hill Road / Hagan Road	Bidirectional	TheBus: 32, 33
Temple Hill Road / Spring Terrace	Bidirectional	TheBus: 32, 33
Temple Hill Road / Fisher Road	Southbound	TheBus: 32, 33
Fisher Road / Holton Lane	Northbound	TheBus: 32, 33
Fisher Road / Fisher Drive	Bidirectional	TheBus: 33
Fisher Road / Temple Boulevard	Bidirectional	TheBus: 33
Fisher Road / Damian Drive	Bidirectional	TheBus: 33
Fisher Road / St. Moritz Drive	Bidirectional	TheBus: 33
Fisher Road / Heather Hill Apartments	Bidirectional	TheBus: 33
Heather Hill Apartments / Main Entrance at Shelter Temple Hills	Northbound stop, Southbound terminal	

== History ==
Routes H11, H12, & H14 initially started as streetcar lines in 1939 which operated under the Washington Marlboro & Annapolis Motor Lines Inc. (WM&A) between Federal Triangle in Downtown Washington DC and the Heather Hills Apartment Complex in Temple Hills, Maryland via Iverson Mall and the Marlow Heights Shopping Center. The line mostly operated along Pennsylvania Avenue, Independence Avenue, 7th Street, Branch Avenue, St. Barnabas Road, Temple Hill Road, and Fisher Road. Route H11 would make a diversion from St. Barnabas Road to serve the Princeton Estates Apartment Complex in Marlow Heights.

Routes H11 and H12 would operate weekly while the H14 would only operate during weekday peak hours. All three routes were later converted into bus routes during the 1950s and eventually acquired by WMATA on February 4, 1973.

On September 25, 1978, more than a year after the Potomac Avenue station opened, routes H11, H12, and H14 were all truncated to only operate between Potomac Avenue station and Temple Hills (Heather Hills Apartments), instead of operating to Federal Triangle in Downtown Washington DC. Service to Downtown was replaced by the Blue Line.

On January 13, 2001 when Naylor Road station opened, routes H11 and H12 were truncated even further to only operate up to Naylor Road station and Heather Hills Apartments, instead of operating to Potomac Avenue station. The segment of H11 and H12's routing between Naylor Road and Potomac Avenue stations was taken over by routes 35 and 36.

Route H14 was discontinued and renamed H13. Route H13 would also operate between Naylor Road and Heather Hills Apartments during the weekday peak hours except skipping the diversion into Hillcrest Heights similar to the old H14.

In 2010 during WMATA's FY2011 budget year, WMATA proposed to reroute the H11, H12, and H13 to Carriage Hill Apartments via Curtis Drive during the weekday and Saturday hours to replace routes C12 and C14 which were proposed to be discontinued.

On June 25, 2017, weekday peak-hour service frequency was reduced from 20 minutes to 25 minutes.

During the Coronavirus disease 2019 pandemic, all Route H11 service was suspended, and the H12 and H13 were relegated to operate on its Saturday supplemental schedule beginning on March 16, 2020. However beginning on March 18, 2020, the route was further reduced to operate on its Sunday schedule, with the H13 being suspended. Also beginning on March 21, 2020, all weekend service was suspended. On August 23, 2020, route H12 added additional weekday service and restored its Saturday schedule, but all Sunday service remained suspended.

On September 26, 2020, WMATA proposed to eliminate all route H11 and H13 service, reduce route H12 service to only every 60 minutes, and eliminate most Sunday service to only operate between 11:20 AM and 3:20 PM. Route H11 has not operated since March 13, 2020 while route H13 has not operated since March 17, 2020 due to Metro's response to the COVID-19 pandemic. However on March 14, 2021, route H12 Sunday service was restored.

On September 5, 2021, full service on the H12 was restored. However, Routes H11 and H13 were never restored and were essentially eliminated.

In 2024 during WMATA's FY2024 Budget crisis, WMATA proposed to eliminate all H12 service. However on April 25, 2024, Metro’s Board of Directors approved a $4.8 billion capital and operating budget which avoided service cuts.

=== Better Bus Redesign ===
In 2022, WMATA launched its Better Bus Redesign project, which aimed to redesign the entire Metrobus Network and is the first full redesign of the agency's bus network in its history.

In April 2023, WMATA launched its Draft Visionary Network. As part of the drafts, WMATA proposed to split the H12 into multiple routes.

One route was combined with the D14 and renamed Route MD264, which would operate between Suitland station and Oxon Hill Park & Ride. The route would operate along the current D14 routing along Silver Hill Road and St. Barnabas Road, then the route would operate on the H12 portion between Marlow Heights Shopping Center and the entrance of Heather Hill Apartments via Keith Street, St Clair Drive, 28th Avenue, Temple Hill Road, Fisher Road. The route would then operate to Oxon Hill Park & Ride via the current D14 routing via Brinkley Road, the Haras Place loop, Oxon Hill Road, Livingston Road, Wentworth Drive, Leyte Drive, Lindsay Road, Livingston Road, Wilson Towers Apartments, Kirby Hill Road, and Oxon Hill Road.

Another route was named Route MD373 and would operate between Naylor Road station and Southern Regional Technology and Recreation Complex. The route would operate via Oxon Run Drive, 28th Parkway, Branch Avenue, Iverson Street, 28th Avenue, Olsen Street, and Raleigh Road. The route would then operate on the H12 portion between the intersection of St. Barnabas Road & Temple Hill Road and Heather Hills Apartments via Temple Hill Road, Fisher Road. The route would them operate to Southern Regional Technology and Recreation Complex via Brinkley Road, St Barnabas Road, and Bock Road.

The last route was named Route MD374 and would operate closely to TheBus Route 32 via H12 service along 23rd Parkway, Olson Street, Lyons Street, St Clair Drive.

All H12 service along Branch Avenue, Coelbrook Drive, 25th Avenue, or 26th Avenue was discontinued with no replacement service.

During WMATA's Revised Draft Visionary Network, WMATA renamed the MD264 to Route P96 and was changed to no longer loop around Marlow Heights Shopping Center, and was instead changed to operate on Silver Hill Road to serve Iverson Street, then was rerouted to take Deer Park Heights to St Clair Drive to serve Marlow Heights Shopping Center without having to loop around. The line would then operate along Olson Street and Raleigh Road before operating on the original proposed Route MD264 routing to Oxon Hill Park & Ride. The P96 would also operate on the D12's Birchwood City loop instead of the proposed Route MD265. Routes MD373 and MD374 were also renamed to Routes P98 (MD373) and P86 (MD374). All changes were then proposed during WMATA's 2025 Proposed Network. During the proposals, Route P98 was dropped completely.

On November 21, 2024, WMATA approved its Better Bus Redesign Network.

Beginning on June 29, 2025, Route H12 was discontinued and taken over by a couple of Metrobus and TheBus routes. Service was mostly replaced by TheBus Route P86 and WMATA Route P96.

== Incidents ==
- On November 14, 2022, a man was robbed and stabbed onboard an H12 bus near Iverson Street and 23rd Parkway. The suspect fled the scene and the victim was in life-threatening condition.
