= Maryland Route 414 =

Highway in Maryland

Maryland Route 414
- Maryland Route 414 highlighted in red

Route information
- Maintained by MDSHA
- Length: 5.64 mi (9.08 km)
- Existed: 1930–present

Major junctions
- West end: Oxon Hill Road in Forest Heights
- MD 210 in Forest Heights; I-95 / I-495 in Forest Heights; MD 5 in Marlow Heights; MD 458 in Silver Hill
- East end: MD 5 in Silver Hill

Location
- Country: United States
- State: Maryland
- Counties: Prince George's

Highway system
- Maryland highway system; Interstate; US; State; Scenic Byways
← MD 413	→ MD 418

Maryland Route 414 (MD 414) is a state highway in the U.S. state of Maryland. The highway runs 5.64 miles (9.08 km) from the beginning of state maintenance in Forest Heights east to MD 5 in Silver Hill. MD 414 connects the inner suburbs of Oxon Hill, Marlow Heights, and Silver Hill and provides access to National Harbor. The highway was constructed through Oxon Hill and Marlow Heights in the early 1930s. MD 414 was extended through Silver Hill along the old alignment of MD 5 when that highway bypassed Silver Hill in the early 1950s. The highway was expanded to a divided highway between Marlow Heights and Silver Hill in the early 1970s, around its interchange with Interstate 95 (I-95) and I-495 in the early 1980s, and around MD 210 in Oxon Hill in the late 1980s. MD 414 was reconstructed around MD 210 again in the mid-2000s with the construction of National Harbor and the new Woodrow Wilson Bridge.

== Route description ==
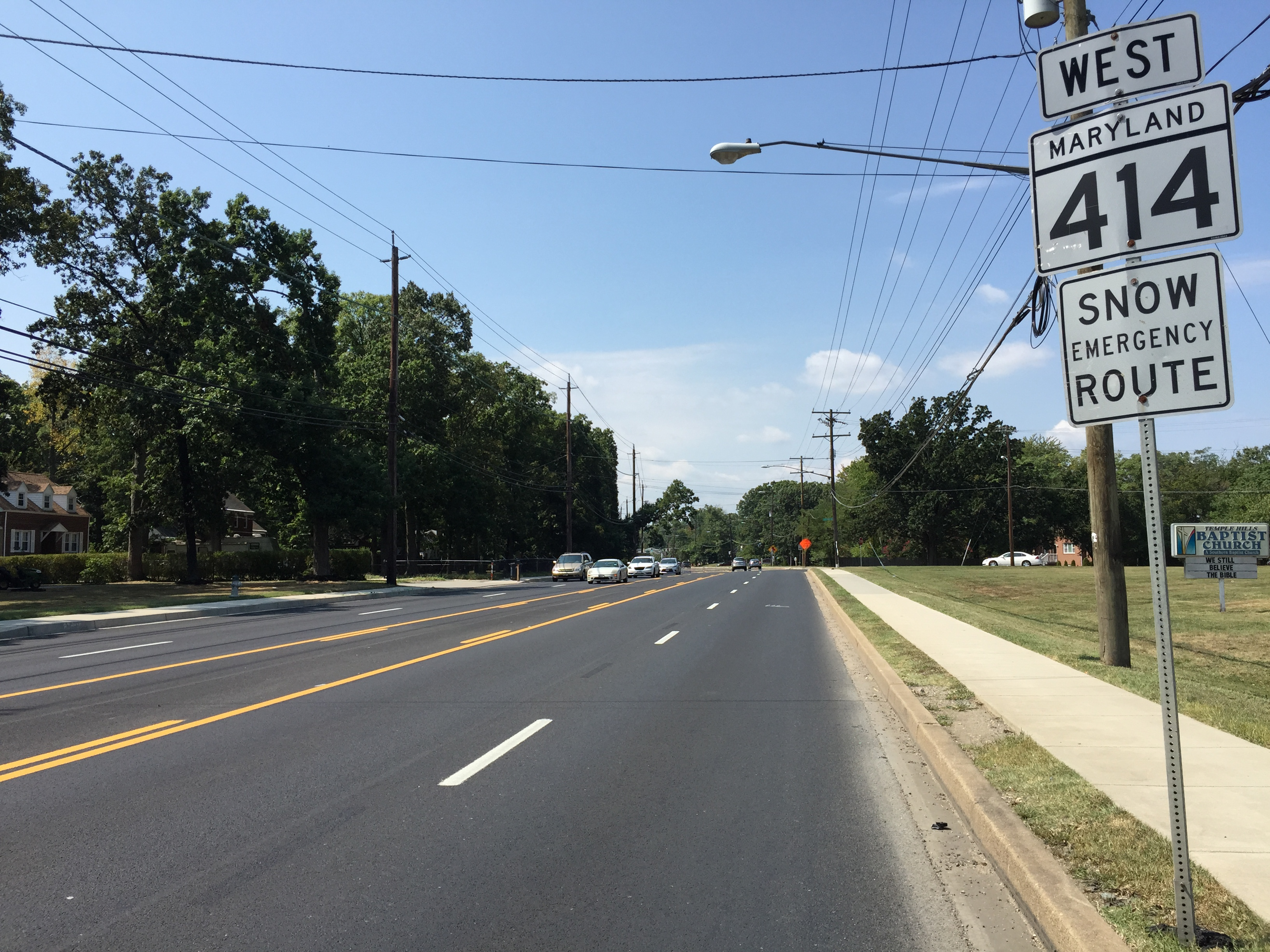
View west along MD 414 in Marlow Heights

MD 414 begins at the county–state maintenance boundary on Oxon Hill Road just north of the entrance to Oxon Hill Manor. Oxon Hill Road continues south toward Fort Washington. MD 414 heads north as a four-lane divided highway, passing to the west of Tanger Outlets National Harbor. The route intersects MGM National Avenue/Tanger Boulevard; MGM National Avenue leads west to the MGM National Harbor casino resort and the National Harbor development on the Potomac River and Tanger Boulevard leads east to the outlet mall and a ramp from I-295 (Anacostia Freeway) and northbound I-95 and I-495 (Capital Beltway). The state highway intersects Monument Avenue, which heads west to National Harbor, and the entrance to a park and ride lot located east of the road. From here, the route expands to six lanes and passes under a pair of long connectors between the three Interstate Highways and MD 210. MD 414 curves east and meets MD 210 (Indian Head Highway) at a four-ramp partial cloverleaf interchange. The north leg of the intersection with the southbound MD 210 ramps is Bald Eagle Road, which is unsigned MD 210V and leads to the Oxon Hill Farm. After passing under a ramp from northbound MD 210 to the northbound Beltway, MD 414 intersects ramps to and from the local lanes of the northbound Beltway.

MD 414 continues east as a four-lane road with a center left-turn lane into the heart of Oxon Hill, where the highway intersects Livingston Road. The highway becomes divided just west of John Hanson Lane, which is unsigned MD 975A and provides full access between MD 414 and both the county-maintained portion of St. Barnabas Road and Brinkley Road. The latter highway leads to historic St. Ignatius Church; Rosecroft Raceway, a harness racing facility; and the community of Temple Hills. Just east of John Hanson Lane, MD 414 continues east as St. Barnabas Road and meets the Capital Beltway at a cloverleaf interchange. The straight exit ramps from the Beltway in the interchange meet the highway at orthogonal four-way intersections that serve Brinkley Road and, on the north side of the Beltway, Alice Avenue. The state highway continues northeast as a four-lane highway with center turn lane and enters Marlow Heights.

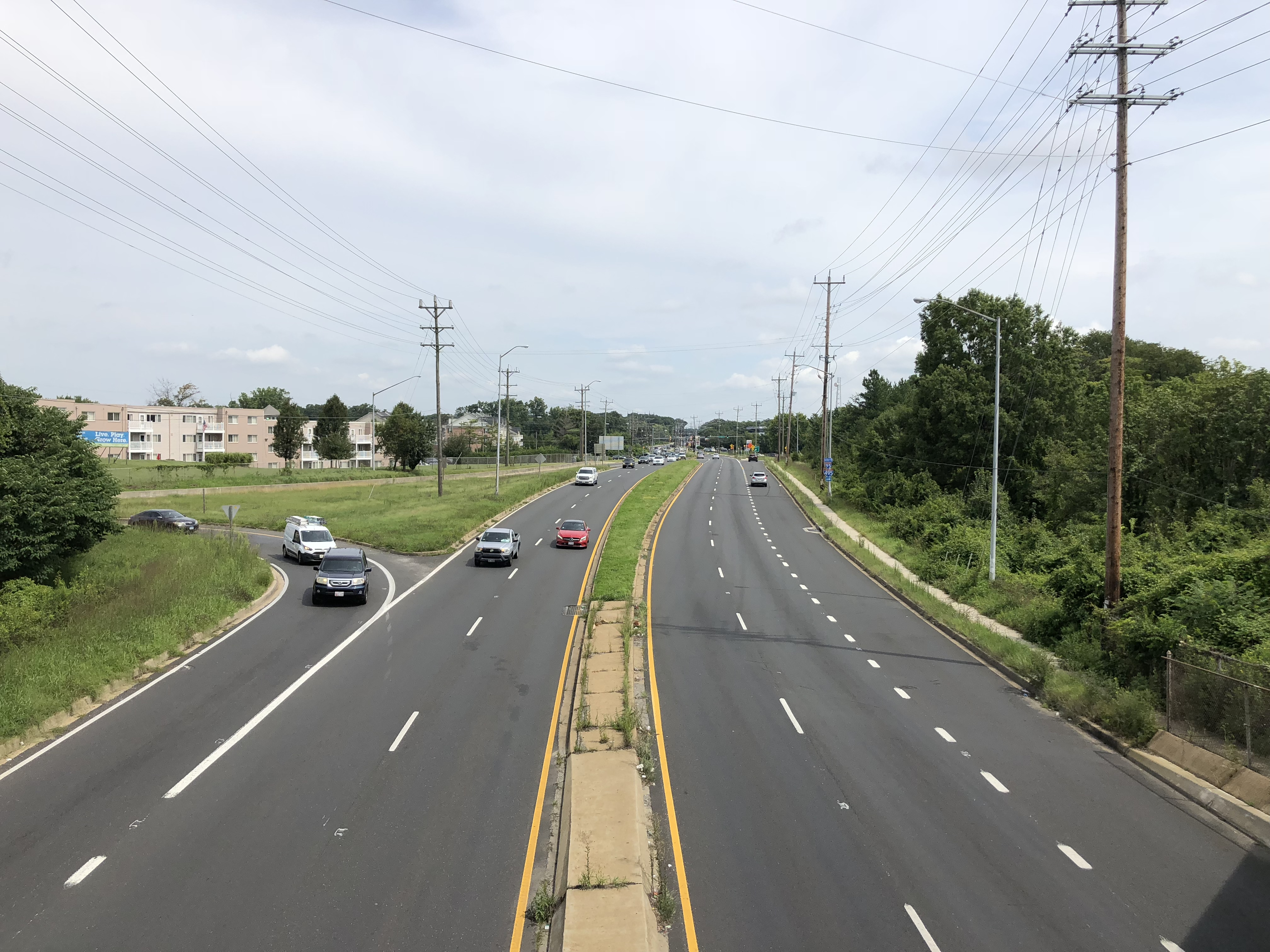
View east along MD 414 from I-95/I-495 in Marlow Heights

East of Temple Hill Road in the center of Marlow Heights, MD 414 expands to a six-lane divided highway. The highway curves north and meets MD 5 (Branch Avenue) at a five-ramp partial cloverleaf interchange, where the highway reduces to four lanes. Just north of the interchange, MD 414 intersects Bedford Way, which is the western end of MD 967A, which includes a segment of Old Branch Avenue that parallels MD 5 to the southeast. The highway continues into Silver Hill, where the highway intersects MD 458 (Silver Hill Road). Just north of the intersection, MD 414 curves west as two-lane Old Silver Hill Road and passes the Paul E. Garber Preservation, Restoration, and Storage Facility, a support facility for the National Air and Space Museum. At its intersection with Bonita Street, the highway turns west onto that street and reaches its eastern terminus at a superstreet intersection with MD 5. There is no direct access from MD 414 to southbound MD 5.

MD 414 is a part of the National Highway System as a principal arterial from MD 210 in Oxon Hill to MD 458 in Silver Hill.

== History ==
The first portion of the modern course of MD 414 to be constructed was the original alignment of MD 5 between the two MD 5–MD 414 junctions in Silver Hill. This segment was built as part of a 14-foot-wide (4.3 m) gravel road from the District of Columbia south to Camp Springs in 1911. This segment was rebuilt as a concrete road by 1921 and widened with a pair of 3-foot-wide (0.91 m) concrete shoulders in 1925. The first segment of MD 414 proper was constructed as a macadam road along Oxon Hill Road from MD 224 (Livingston Road) at Hunt's Corner to St. Barnabas Road at Phelps Corner in 1929 and 1930. The modern highway was extended northeast as a macadam road along St. Barnabas Road to MD 5 at Gordon's Corner in Marlow Heights in at least two sections; the first section was underway in 1930 and the last section was completed by 1933. The last segment of MD 414 was built along Oxon Hill Road west from Hunt's Corner to Oxon Hill Manor near the present western terminus of the highway in 1933.

MD 414 was widened and resurfaced from MD 210 to MD 5 at Gordon's Corner in 1949 and 1950. In 1952, MD 5 was relocated to its present divided-highway alignment through Silver Hill. MD 414 was extended north along MD 5's old alignment to its current eastern terminus. The portion of the state highway from Oxon Hill Manor to MD 210 was transferred to county maintenance in 1955. MD 414's and MD 210's interchanges with the Capital Beltway opened in 1964. The Beltway's MD 210 interchange was a full cloverleaf with the straight ramps to and from northbound I-495 ending at intersections with MD 414. The Beltway's MD 414 interchange originally included only a straight ramp from westbound MD 414 to southbound I-495 and a loop ramp from northbound I-495 to eastbound MD 414. Four ramps were added to the Beltway–MD 414 interchange in 1981; the remaining two ramps, both in the northeast quadrant, were added in 1983.

MD 414 was expanded to a divided highway from MD 458 south to the center of Marlow Heights east of Temple Hill Road in 1971; the MD 5–MD 414 interchange opened the same year. The portion of the highway through Phelps Corner and the Capital Beltway interchange was expanded to a divided highway in 1983. Both MD 414 and the county-maintained portion of Oxon Hill Road immediately to the west of MD 210 were expanded to a divided highway during construction of the S-ramps directly connecting MD 210 with I-295 in 1989. MD 414 was reassigned to the portion of Oxon Hill Road between MD 210 and Oxon Hill Manor in 2004. MD 414 in Oxon Hill was included in the highway expansion construction associated with the construction of the new Woodrow Wilson Bridge starting in 2006. The state highway was relocated for the reconstruction of MD 210's interchange with the Beltway. This project the opening of several new or reconstructed ramps between the Beltway and MD 414 and the construction of the MD 414–MD 210 interchange in 2007.

== Junction list ==
The entire route is in Prince George's County.

Location	mi	km	Destinations	Notes
Oxon Hill	0.00	0.00	Oxon Hill Road south – Fort Washington	Southern terminus; end of state maintenance
Oxon Hill	0.52	0.84	MD 210 (Indian Head Highway) to I-95 south / I-495 south – Forest Heights, Indian Head, Richmond	Partial cloverleaf interchange
Oxon Hill	0.69	1.11	I-95 north / I-495 north (Capital Beltway) – Baltimore	I-95/I-495 Exit 3B; ramps to and from northbound I-95/I-495
Oxon Hill	1.83	2.95	John Hanson Lane to St. Barnabas Road south / Brinkley Road east – Rosecroft Raceway	John Hanson Lane is unsigned MD 975A
Oxon Hill	2.18	3.51	I-95 / I-495 (Capital Beltway) – College Park, Baltimore, Alexandria, Richmond	I-95/I-495 Exit 4
Marlow Heights	4.57	7.35	MD 5 (Branch Avenue) – Camp Springs, Washington	Partial cloverleaf interchange
Silver Hill	5.15	8.29	MD 458 (Silver Hill Road) – Hillcrest Heights, Suitland	
Silver Hill	5.64	9.08	MD 5 north (Branch Avenue) – Washington	Eastern terminus; superstreet intersection; no direct access from MD 414 to southbound MD 5
1.000 mi = 1.609 km; 1.000 km = 0.621 mi: Incomplete access

== Auxiliary route ==
MD 414A is the designation for the 0.07-mile (0.11 km) segment of Old Silver Hill Road immediately to the north of Bonita Street adjacent to MD 414's northern terminus in Silver Hill.
