= Maryland Route 458 =

State highway in Maryland, United States

Maryland Route 458
- Silver Hill Road

Route information
- Maintained by MDSHA
- Length: 3.12 mi (5.02 km)
- Existed: 1933–present

Major junctions
- South end: MD 5 in Silver Hill
- MD 414 in Silver Hill; Suitland Parkway in Suitland; MD 218 in Suitland; MD 4 near Suitland
- North end: Walker Mill Road in District Heights

Location
- Country: United States
- State: Maryland
- Counties: Prince George's

Highway system
- Maryland highway system; Interstate; US; State; Scenic Byways
← MD 456	→ MD 459

Maryland Route 458 (MD 458) is a state highway in the U.S. state of Maryland. Known as Silver Hill Road, the highway runs 3.12 miles (5.02 km) from MD 5 in Silver Hill north to Walker Mill Road in District Heights. MD 458 is a four- to six-lane divided highway that connects the inner suburbs of Hillcrest Heights, Silver Hill, Suitland, and District Heights in western Prince George's County. The highway also connects those communities with the Suitland station of the Washington Metro. MD 458 was originally constructed in the early 1930s between the original alignments of MD 5 and MD 4. The route was relocated in District Heights in 1960 and widened to a divided highway in the mid-1960s. MD 458 was extended to its present southern and northern termini in the late 1960s and mid-1980s, respectively.

== Route description ==
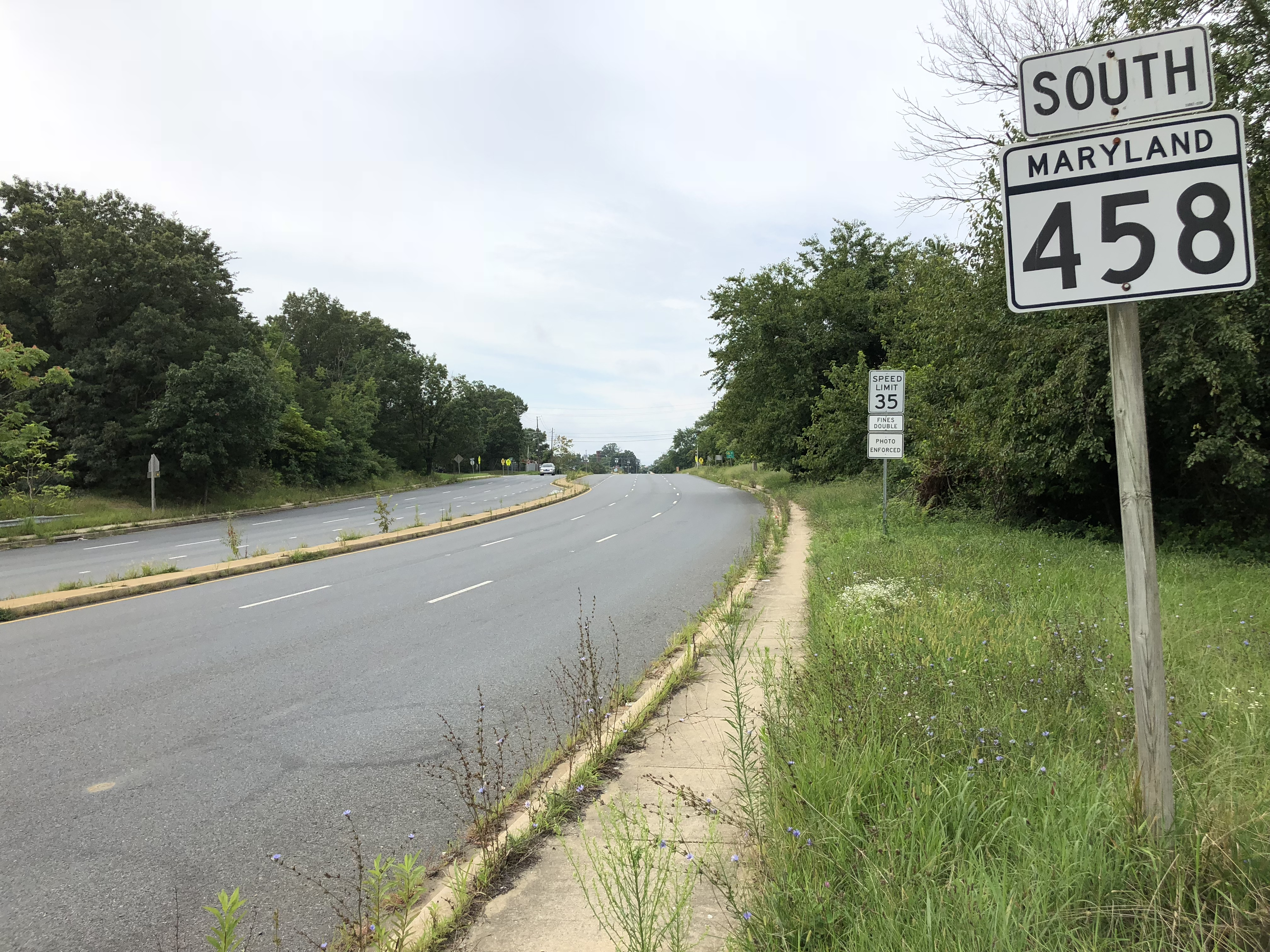
View south from the north end of MD 458 at Walker Mill Road in District Heights

MD 458 begins at an intersection with MD 5 (Branch Avenue) in Silver Hill. The west leg of the intersection is Iverson Street, which passes under The Shops at Iverson and through Hillcrest Heights. MD 458 heads east as a four-lane divided highway and intersects MD 414, which heads south as St. Barnabas Road and north as Old Silver Hill Road. The highway expands to six lanes east of MD 414 and passes a Smithsonian Institution Libraries support center. MD 458 enters Suitland at its partial cloverleaf interchange with the Suitland Parkway. Just beyond the parkway, the highway passes the Suitland station on the Washington Metro's Green Line. MD 458 continues past the Suitland Federal Center, whose main tenant is the U.S. Census Bureau, and intersects Suitland Road, which heads northwest as MD 218 in the center of Suitland. The highway passes Suitland High School before its intersection with MD 4 (Pennsylvania Avenue). Just east of MD 4, unsigned MD 972 splits east along Old Silver Hill Road toward the center of District Heights. MD 458 passes along the edge of the town and intersects Marlboro Pike before reaching its northern terminus at Walker Mill Road. The intersection is a T-intersection with Walker Mill Road turning from southeast to northeast at the junction; this portion of Walker Mill Road is unsigned MD 458A.

MD 458 a part of the National Highway System as an intermodal connector from MD 5 in Silver Hill to MD 4 in Suitland. The remainder of the route from MD 4 east to Walker Mill Road is a National Highway System principal arterial.

== History ==
MD 458 was constructed as a concrete road in two sections—from MD 5 (now MD 414) in Silver Hill to MD 218 in Suitland, and from MD 218 to MD 4 (now Marlboro Pike) in District Heights—between 1930 and 1933. The whole highway was widened with the addition of a pair of 3.5-foot-wide (1.1 m) bituminous shoulders between 1940 and 1942. MD 458's interchange with the Suitland Parkway was built in its modern configuration when the parkway was constructed through Suitland in 1943. The first divided highway portion of MD 458 was created in 1960 when the highway was relocated from just south of the just-completed present alignment of MD 4 north to the old alignment of MD 4 in District Heights. Marlboro Pike became MD 4 Business, which was removed in 1970; Old Silver Hill Road became MD 972A. The divided highway was extended west from MD 4 to MD 414 in 1965. MD 458 was constructed as a divided highway to its present terminus at MD 5 in 1967; Old Silver Hill Road became an extension of MD 414. The highway was constructed as a divided highway from Marlboro Pike north to its present terminus with Walker Mill Road in 1985.

== Junction list ==
The entire route is in Prince George's County.

Location	mi	km	Destinations	Notes
Silver Hill	0.00	0.00	MD 5 (Branch Avenue) / Iverson Street west – Waldorf, Hillcrest Heights, Washington	Southern terminus
Silver Hill	0.25	0.40	MD 414 (St. Barnabas Road/Old Silver Hill Road) – Oxon Hill	
Suitland	0.83	1.34	Suitland Parkway to MD 4 – Washington	Partial cloverleaf interchange
Suitland	1.41	2.27	MD 218 west (Suitland Road) / Suitland Road east – Morningside	Eastern terminus of MD 218
Suitland	2.28	3.67	MD 4 (Pennsylvania Avenue) – Upper Marlboro, Washington	
District Heights	2.40	3.86	Old Silver Hill Road north	Unsigned MD 972A
District Heights	3.12	5.02	Walker Mill Road	Northern terminus; Walker Mill Road is unsigned MD 458A
1.000 mi = 1.609 km; 1.000 km = 0.621 mi

== Auxiliary routes ==
- MD 458A is the designation for a 0.36-mile (0.58 km) section of Walker Mill Road on either side of MD 458's northern terminus near District Heights. The section northwest of MD 458 is a four-lane undivided highway; the segment northeast of the mainline that serves as its continuation is a six-lane divided highway.
- MD 458B is the designation for a 0.08-mile (0.13 km) section of County Road south from County Road's intersection with Walker Mill Road (MD 458A).
