= Julian Peterson =

American football player (born 1978)

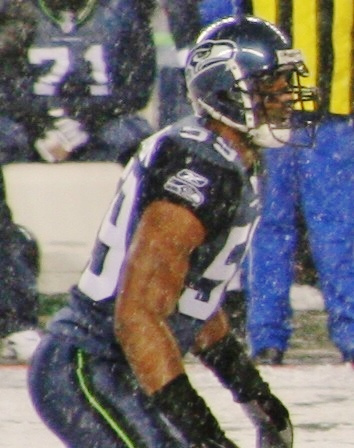
- Peterson with the Seattle Seahawks in 2006

No. 98, 59
- Position: Linebacker

Personal information
- Born: July 28, 1978 (age 48); Hillcrest Heights, Maryland, U.S.
- Listed height: 6 ft 3 in (1.91 m)
- Listed weight: 240 lb (109 kg)

Career information
- High school: Crossland (Temple Hills, Maryland)
- College: Valley Forge (1996–1997); Michigan State (1998–1999)
- NFL draft: 2000: 1st round, 16th overall pick

Career history
- San Francisco 49ers (2000–2005); Seattle Seahawks (2006–2008); Detroit Lions (2009–2010)

Awards and highlights
- First-team All-Pro (2003); Second-team All-Pro (2002); 5× Pro Bowl (2002, 2003, 2006–2008); Third-team All-American (1999); First-team All-Big Ten (1999)

Career NFL statistics
- Total tackles: 809
- Sacks: 51.5
- Forced fumbles: 21
- Fumble recoveries: 11
- Interceptions: 8
- Defensive touchdowns: 1
- Stats at Pro Football Reference

Julian Thomas Peterson (born July 28, 1978) is an American former professional football player who was a linebacker for eleven seasons in the National Football League (NFL). He played college football for the Michigan State Spartans. Peterson was selected by the San Francisco 49ers in the first round of the 2000 NFL draft. He also played for the Seattle Seahawks and Detroit Lions.

== Early life ==
Peterson attended Crossland High School in Temple Hills, Maryland. He was the 1996 Chesapeake Classic MVP.

== College career ==
Peterson attended Valley Forge Military Academy and College for two years before attending Michigan State. In two seasons at Valley Forge, he recorded 39.5 sacks and was first-team NJCAA All-America and Seaboard Conference Defensive Player of the Year as a sophomore.

Peterson played college football at Michigan State University for his junior and senior year. As a junior, he was the honorable mention All-Big Ten pick by the media. As a senior, he was an All-American selection by Football News and the Sporting News after recording 15 sacks. In his two years at Michigan State he recorded 140 tackles and 25 sacks in only 23 games.

== Professional career ==
=== San Francisco 49ers ===
Peterson was drafted by the San Francisco 49ers in the first round with the 16th overall pick in the 2000 NFL Draft. The 16th overall pick was acquired by San Francisco in a trade with the New York Jets. The Jets were originally given the pick by the New England Patriots, as a result of the controversy of Bill Belichick leaving the Jets’ head coaching position a few months prior to take the same role with the Patriots. As a rookie he started seven of 13 games recording 47 tackles, four sacks, and two interceptions. In 2002 Peterson was elected to the Pro Bowl for the first time after posting 94 tackles. In six seasons in San Francisco he recorded 394 tackles, 21.5 sacks, and five interceptions in 79 games and was elected to two Pro Bowls.

=== Seattle Seahawks ===
Peterson signed with the Seattle Seahawks before the 2006 season. In his first season in Seattle, he was selected to the Pro Bowl for the third time after recording 89 tackles and a career-high 10 sacks. In his second season with the Seahawks he was selected to the Pro Bowl for the second straight year after posting 74 tackles and 9.5 sacks. During the 2008 NFL Training Camp, Peterson switched jersey numbers from #59 to #98, the number he wore during his previous tenure at San Francisco. In his third season with the team, Peterson made 86 tackles and five sacks, and was selected to his third consecutive Pro Bowl. In three seasons in Seattle, he recorded 249 tackles, 24.5 sacks, and three interceptions in 48 games and was elected to three Pro Bowls.

=== Detroit Lions ===
The Seattle Seahawks traded Peterson to the Detroit Lions for defensive tackle Cory Redding and a 2009 fifth-round pick on March 14, 2009. On January 5, 2011, Peterson was given his release by the Lions.

== NFL statistics ==
=== Regular season ===
Year	Team	GP	Tackles				Fumbles			Interceptions					
Year	Team	GP	Comb	Solo	Ast	Sack	FF	FR	Yds	Int	Yds	Avg	Lng	TD	PD
2000	SF	13	46	29	17	4.0	0	0	0	2	33	16.5	31	0	10
2001	SF	14	51	37	14	3.0	0	2	0	0	0	0.0	0	0	3
2002	SF	16	94	76	18	2.0	2	1	0	1	2	2.0	2	0	7
2003	SF	16	94	69	25	7.0	3	0	0	2	31	15.5	31	0	11
2004	SF	5	27	23	4	2.5	1	0	0	0	0	0.0	0	0	2
2005	SF	15	82	57	25	3.0	1	1	0	0	0	0.0	0	0	5
2006	SEA	16	89	71	18	10.0	1	1	0	1	-4	-4.0	-4	0	6
2007	SEA	16	74	63	11	9.5	4	2	0	2	3	1.5	3	0	3
2008	SEA	16	86	65	21	5.0	4	1	0	0	0	0.0	0	0	5
2009	DET	16	76	49	27	4.5	5	1	1	0	0	0.0	0	0	4
2010	DET	15	83	56	27	1.0	0	1	0	0	0	0.0	0	0	5
Career		158	802	595	207	51.5	21	10	1	8	65	8.1	31	0	61

=== Postseason ===
Year	Team	GP	Tackles				Fumbles		Interceptions					
Year	Team	GP	Comb	Solo	Ast	Sack	FF	FR	Int	Yds	Avg	Lng	TD	PD
2001	SF	1	11	8	3	1.0	0	0	0	0	0.0	0	0	0
2002	SF	2	19	15	4	2.0	2	0	1	0	0.0	0	0	4
2006	SEA	2	13	8	5	1.0	1	0	0	0	0.0	0	0	1
2007	SEA	2	16	10	6	1.0	0	0	0	0	0.0	0	0	0
Career		7	59	41	18	5.0	3	0	1	0	0.0	0	0	5

== Personal life ==
Peterson is married to his wife Aimee and has four sons, Jadden, Jayson, Josiah, and Julian Jr. Julian and Aimee's wedding was featured on WE tv's Platinum Weddings.
