= Marlow Heights, Maryland =

- Census-designated place
- Location of Marlow Heights, Maryland
- Coordinates: 38°49′31″N 76°56′52″W
- Country: United States
- State: Maryland
- County: Prince George's

Area
  - Total: 2.03 sq mi (5.27 km^{2})
  - Land: 2.03 sq mi (5.26 km^{2})
  - Water: 0.0039 sq mi (0.01 km^{2})
- Elevation: 260 ft (80 m)

Population (2020)
  - Total: 6,169
  - Density: 3,035.4/sq mi (1,171.98/km^{2})
- Time zone: UTC−5 (Eastern (EST))
  - Summer (DST): UTC−4 (EDT)
- ZIP codes: 20746, 20748
- Area codes: 301, 240
- FIPS code: 24-50750
- GNIS feature ID: 0597719

Marlow Heights is an unincorporated area and census-designated place (CDP) in Prince George's County, Maryland, United States. The population was 6,169 at the 2020 census. The Marlow Heights Shopping Center first opened in 1957 (but extended in 1960 with Hecht's), adjacent to the large community of Hillcrest Heights. It was joined ten years later, in 1967, by the two-level Iverson Mall, the Washington metropolitan area's first enclosed mall.

For mailing address purposes, the area is part of Temple Hills or Suitland. Marlow Heights is located near the U.S. Census Bureau, Andrews Air Force Base, the Metrorail Green Line and Capitol Hill.

== Geography ==
Marlow Heights is located at 38°49′31″N 76°56′52″W (38.825263, −76.947864).

According to the United States Census Bureau, the CDP has a total area of 2.1 square miles (5.4 km^{2}), all land.

== Demographics ==
Historical population
Census	Pop.	Note	%±
2000	6,059		—
2010	5,618		−7.3%
2020	6,169		9.8%
U.S. Decennial Census; 2010 2020

=== Racial and ethnic composition ===
Marlow Heights CDP, Maryland – Racial and ethnic composition Note: the US Census treats Hispanic/Latino as an ethnic category. This table excludes Latinos from the racial categories and assigns them to a separate category. Hispanics/Latinos may be of any race.
Race / Ethnicity (NH = Non-Hispanic)	Pop 2000	Pop 2010	Pop 2020	% 2000	% 2010	% 2020
White alone (NH)	474	272	211	7.82%	4.84%	3.42%
Black or African American alone (NH)	5,329	4,829	4,622	87.95%	85.96%	74.92%
Native American or Alaska Native alone (NH)	12	21	20	0.20%	0.37%	0.32%
Asian alone (NH)	62	104	109	1.02%	1.85%	1.77%
Native Hawaiian or Pacific Islander alone (NH)	0	1	2	0.00%	0.02%	0.03%
Other race alone (NH)	3	17	19	0.05%	0.30%	0.31%
Mixed race or Multiracial (NH)	87	96	155	1.44%	1.71%	2.51%
Hispanic or Latino (any race)	92	278	1,031	1.52%	4.95%	16.71%
Total	6,059	5,618	6,169	100.00%	100.00%	100.00%

=== 2020 census ===
As of the 2020 census, Marlow Heights had a population of 6,169. The median age was 38.1 years. 21.3% of residents were under the age of 18 and 16.0% of residents were 65 years of age or older. For every 100 females there were 84.6 males, and for every 100 females age 18 and over there were 80.1 males age 18 and over.

100.0% of residents lived in urban areas, while 0.0% lived in rural areas.

There were 2,435 households in Marlow Heights, of which 28.6% had children under the age of 18 living in them. Of all households, 26.3% were married-couple households, 22.0% were households with a male householder and no spouse or partner present, and 44.8% were households with a female householder and no spouse or partner present. About 31.9% of all households were made up of individuals and 12.3% had someone living alone who was 65 years of age or older.

There were 2,577 housing units, of which 5.5% were vacant. The homeowner vacancy rate was 0.9% and the rental vacancy rate was 5.9%.

=== 2000 Census ===
As of the census of 2000, there were 6,059 people, 2,316 households, and 1,588 families residing in the CDP. The population density was 2,938.6 inhabitants per square mile (1,134.6/km^{2}). There were 2,427 housing units at an average density of 1,177.1 per square mile (454.5/km^{2}). The racial makeup of the CDP was 8.12% White, 88.53% African American, 0.23% Native American, 1.02% Asian, 0.36% from other races, and 1.73% from two or more races. Hispanic or Latino of any race were 1.52% of the population.

There were 2,316 households, out of which 35.1% had children under the age of 18 living with them, 35.9% were married couples living together, 26.2% had a female householder with no husband present, and 31.4% were non-families. 24.4% of all households were made up of individuals, and 3.9% had someone living alone who was 65 years of age or older. The average household size was 2.61 and the average family size was 3.09.

In the CDP, the population was spread out, with 27.7% under the age of 18, 9.6% from 18 to 24, 31.9% from 25 to 44, 22.8% from 45 to 64, and 8.0% who were 65 years of age or older. The median age was 34 years. For every 100 females, there were 84.8 males. For every 100 females age 18 and over, there were 77.3 males.

The median income for a household in the CDP was $46,995, and the median income for a family was $52,875. Males had a median income of $33,935 versus $32,500 for females. The per capita income for the CDP was $21,629. About 4.6% of families and 7.8% of the population were below the poverty line, including 8.4% of those under age 18 and 4.5% of those age 65 or over.

== Government ==
Prince George's County Police Department District 4 Station in Glassmanor CDP, with an Oxon Hill postal address, serves the community.

The United States Postal Service operates the Temple Hills Post Office in the Marlow Heights CDP, with a Temple Hills postal address.

== Education ==
The CDP is served by the Prince George's County Public Schools district.

Sections are served by Barnaby Manor and Hillcrest Heights elementary schools. Sections are served by Benjamin Stoddert and Thurgood Marshall middle schools. Sections are served by Crossland High School and Potomac High School.

Imagine Schools operates Imagine Lincoln Public Charter School in Marlow Heights; it has a Temple Hills postal address.
