= Maryland Route 218 =

State highway in Maryland, United States

Maryland Route 218
- Suitland Road
- Maryland Route 218 highlighted in red

Route information
- Maintained by MDSHA
- Length: 1.64 mi (2.64 km)
- Existed: 1927–present

Major junctions
- West end: Suitland Road at the District of Columbia boundary in Suitland
- East end: MD 458 in Suitland

Location
- Country: United States
- State: Maryland
- Counties: Prince George's

Highway system
- Maryland highway system; Interstate; US; State; Scenic Byways
← MD 216	→ US 219

Maryland Route 218 (MD 218) is a state highway located in Prince George's County in the U.S. state of Maryland. Known as Suitland Road, the highway runs 1.64 miles (2.64 km) from near Southern Avenue at the District of Columbia boundary east to MD 458 in Suitland. MD 218 provides access to the Suitland Federal Center, which is home to the U.S. Census Bureau. The state highway was constructed in the late 1920s and widened in the early 1940s and again in the late 1940s. The county portion of Suitland Road was reconstructed by the state in the mid-1950s.

== Route description ==
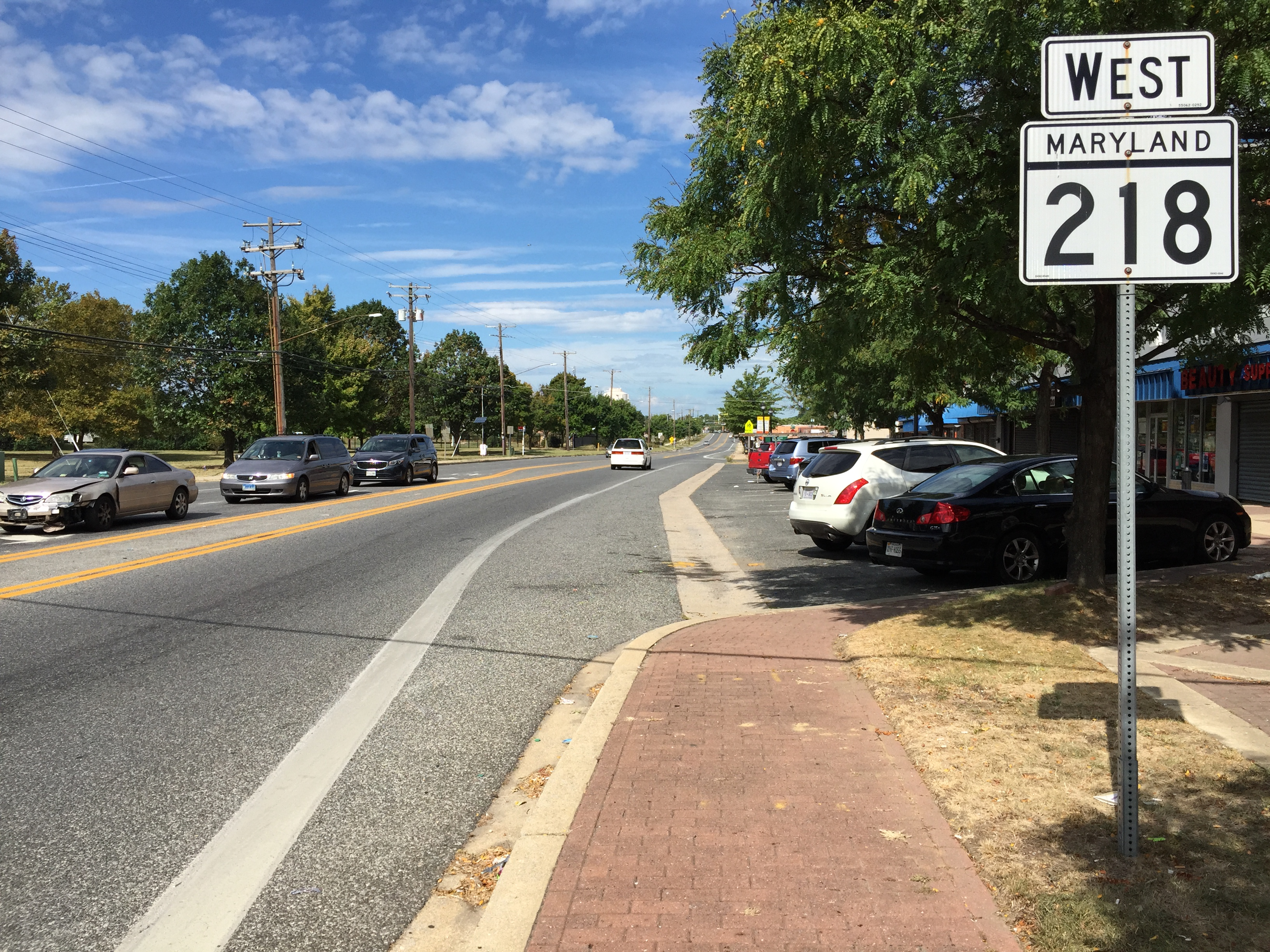
View west from the east end of MD 218 at MD 458 in Suitland

MD 218 begins at Southern Avenue at the District of Columbia boundary. Suitland Road continues west into Washington to an intersection with Alabama Avenue in the Fairfax Village neighborhood. MD 218 heads southeast as a two-lane undivided road between apartment complexes and crosses Oxon Run. The highway passes between Cedar Hill Cemetery to the north and Lincoln Memorial and Washington Memorial cemeteries to the south. East of the cemeteries, MD 218 gains a center left-turn lane and passes between Suitland Manor neighborhood on the north and Suitland Federal Center on the south; the federal center's main tenant is the U.S. Census Bureau. The state highway reaches its eastern terminus in the center of Suitland at MD 458 (Silver Hill Road). Suitland Road continues southeast as a county highway through a diamond interchange with Suitland Parkway, the town of Morningside, and a half-diamond interchange with Interstate 95 (I-95)/I-495 (Capital Beltway) to its terminus at MD 337 (Allentown Road) on the edge of Andrews Air Force Base.

== History ==
MD 218, which has also been known as Cedar Hill Cemetery Road and River Road, was constructed as a 15-to-16-foot-wide (4.6 to 4.9 m) concrete road from the District of Columbia boundary to the east end of the Cedar Hill Cemetery grounds in 1926. The concrete highway was extended to the center of Suitland at MD 458 by 1930. By 1934, the highway was proposed to be widened to 20 feet (6.1 m) for its whole length. The first round of widening of MD 218 took place when a pair of 3.5-foot-wide (1.1 m) bituminous shoulders were added from the District to the east end of the cemetery grounds between 1938 and 1940 and from there to Suitland between 1940 and 1942. In addition, the highway's one-lane bridge across Oxon Run was replaced with the present bridge in 1940 and 1941. MD 218 was widened a second time, this time to a minimum width of 36 feet (11 m) for its whole length, in 1949 and 1950. The county-maintained portion of Suitland Road, which was also known as Mayhew Road and has never been part of MD 218, was reconstructed and paved by the Maryland State Roads Commission in two sections from MD 458 to Suitland Parkway and from the parkway to MD 337 at Andrews Air Force Base in 1954.

== Junction list ==
The entire route is in Suitland, Prince George's County.

mi	km	Destinations	Notes
0.00	0.00	Southern Avenue / Suitland Road west – Washington	District of Columbia boundary; western terminus
1.86	2.99	MD 458 (Silver Hill Road) / Suitland Road east – Silver Hill, District Heights, Morningside	Eastern terminus
1.000 mi = 1.609 km; 1.000 km = 0.621 mi
