= Potomac High School (Maryland) =

Location
- 5211 Boydell Avenue; Oxon Hill, Maryland 20745; United States
- Coordinates: 38°49′19″N 76°58′38.40″W

Information
- Funding type: Public high school
- School district: Prince George's County Public Schools
- Superintendent: Monica Goldson
- Principal: Nathaniel R. Laney
- Grades: 9–12
- Enrollment: 1,067
- Language: English
- Campus: Suburban
- Colors: Blue and yellow
- Mascot: Wolverines
- Rival: Crossland High School; Oxon Hill High School
- Feeder schools: Benjamin Stoddert Middle School; Thurgood Marshall Middle School
- Website: https://www.pgcps.org/potomac/

Potomac High School is a public high school located in the Glassmanor census-designated place in unincorporated Prince George's County, Maryland, United States, with an Oxon Hill postal address. It is a part of Prince George's County Public Schools.

The principal is Nathaniel R. Laney. The approximate enrollment as of August 2010 stands at 1,216 students in grades nine through twelve. The school hours are from 7:45am to 2:25pm. Potomac operates on an alternating A/B-Day block schedule. There is a mandatory uniform policy at this school. Potomac features a school-wide America's Choice School Design signature program as well as an expansive "smaller learning communities" program, that essentially breaks the school down into smaller schools or "career academies".

The school serves: all of Glassmanor CDP, the Town of Forest Heights, most of Hillcrest Heights CDP, a portion of Marlow Heights CDP, and a portion of Silver Hill CDP.

== Smaller learning communities ==
- School of Arts, Media, and Communications
  - Academy of the Arts - Dance
  - Academy of the Arts - Music
  - Academy of the Arts - Visual
- School of Business Management and Finance
  - Academy of Finance
  - Academy of Business Management
- School of Consumer Services, Hospitality and Tourism
  - Academy of Hospitality and Restaurant Management
- School of Human Resource Services
  - Academy of Military Sciences
  - Teacher Academy of Maryland
- School of Manufacturing, Engineering and Technology

== Notable alumni ==
- Dante Cunningham, NBA player who played for Portland Trail Blazers, Charlotte Bobcats, Memphis Grizzlies, Minnesota Timberwolves, New Orleans Pelicans, Brooklyn Nets, San Antonio Spurs
- Ronald Darby, NFL player who played for Buffalo Bills, Philadelphia Eagles, Washington Football Team, Denver Broncos
- Tavon Young, NFL player who played for Baltimore Ravens and Chicago Bears
- Monty Williams, head coach of Detroit Pistons
- Kevin Hooks, actor and director
