= Temple Hills, Maryland =

- Census-designated place
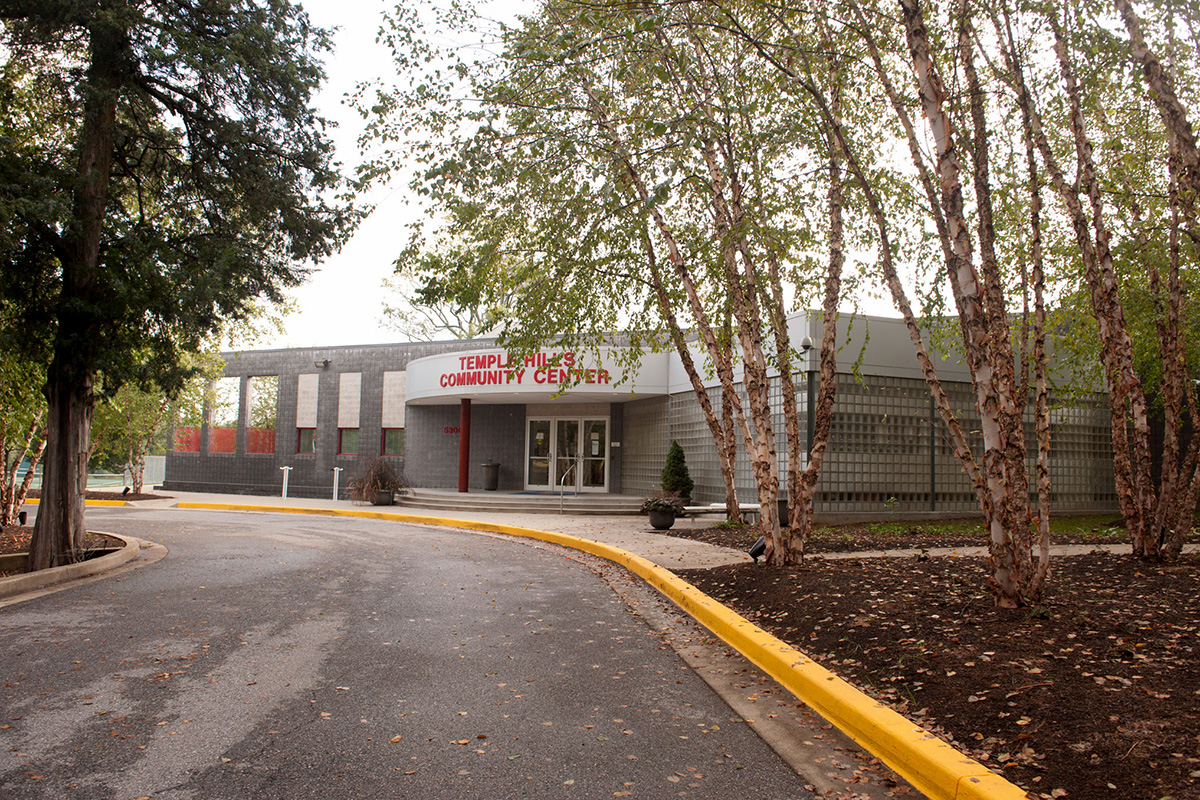
- The community center located in Temple Hills, MD

- Location of Temple Hills, Maryland
- Coordinates: 38°48′38″N 76°56′47″W
- Country: United States
- State: Maryland
- County: Prince George's

Area
  - Total: 1.41 sq mi (3.65 km^{2})
  - Land: 1.41 sq mi (3.65 km^{2})
  - Water: 0 sq mi (0.00 km^{2})
- Elevation: 269 ft (82 m)

Population (2020)
  - Total: 8,350
  - Density: 5,931.6/sq mi (2,290.19/km^{2})
- Time zone: UTC−5 (Eastern (EST))
  - Summer (DST): UTC−4 (EDT)
- Area codes: 301, 240
- FIPS code: 24-77100
- GNIS feature ID: 0598158

Temple Hills is an unincorporated area and census-designated place (CDP) in Prince George's County, Maryland, United States. Temple Hills borders the communities of Hillcrest Heights, Marlow Heights, Camp Springs and Oxon Hill. Per the 2020 census, the population was 8,350.

The community was named after Edward Temple, who in the 1860s lived in a home beside Henson Creek known as Moor Park. Within the area are numerous garden apartments, duplexes, and single family communities constructed mostly from the 1950s through 1970s. The adjacent, unincorporated communities of Hillcrest Heights and Marlow Heights, which are home to both the Iverson Mall & Marlow Heights Shopping Center, which both serve the community of Temple Hills, are assigned Temple Hills addresses and zipcodes.

Rosecroft Raceway (since 1949, harness horse racing) is nearby in Oxon Hill, although the racing audience has declined greatly. There are large public indoor and outdoor swimming pools operated by the Maryland-National Capital Park and Planning Commission, and also the private Temple Hills Swim Club. The area is especially convenient to the Capital Beltway (I-95/I-495), the Metrorail Green Line, Joint Base Andrews, the U.S. Census Bureau, and Capitol Hill.

Since the clogged interstate Woodrow Wilson Bridge was widened in 2008, commuter access to Northern Virginia's job market has improved.

== Geography ==
Temple Hills is located at 38°48′38″N 76°56′47″W (38.810580, −76.946360).

According to the United States Census Bureau, the CDP has a total area of 1.4 square miles (3.6 km^{2}), all land.

== Demographics ==
Historical population
Census	Pop.	Note	%±
1980	6,630		—
1990	6,865		3.5%
2000	7,792		13.5%
2010	7,852		0.8%
2020	8,350		6.3%
U.S. Decennial Census; 2010 2020

=== Racial and ethnic composition ===
Temple Hills CDP, Maryland – Racial and ethnic composition Note: the US Census treats Hispanic/Latino as an ethnic category. This table excludes Latinos from the racial categories and assigns them to a separate category. Hispanics/Latinos may be of any race.
Race / Ethnicity (NH = Non-Hispanic)	Pop 2000	Pop 2010	Pop 2020	% 2000	% 2010	% 2020
White alone (NH)	651	332	315	8.35%	4.23%	3.77%
Black or African American alone (NH)	6,559	6,748	6,833	84.18%	85.94%	81.83%
Native American or Alaska Native alone (NH)	14	19	14	0.18%	0.24%	0.17%
Asian alone (NH)	104	94	120	1.33%	1.20%	1.44%
Native Hawaiian or Pacific Islander alone (NH)	7	2	1	0.09%	0.03%	0.01%
Other race alone (NH)	19	15	24	0.24%	0.19%	0.29%
Mixed race or Multiracial (NH)	96	158	225	1.23%	2.01%	2.69%
Hispanic or Latino (any race)	342	484	818	4.39%	6.16%	9.80%
Total	7,792	7,852	8,350	100.00%	100.00%	100.00%

=== 2020 census ===
As of the 2020 census, Temple Hills had a population of 8,350. The median age was 34.5 years. 24.5% of residents were under the age of 18 and 11.3% of residents were 65 years of age or older. For every 100 females there were 79.6 males, and for every 100 females age 18 and over there were 74.6 males age 18 and over.

100.0% of residents lived in urban areas, while 0.0% lived in rural areas.

There were 3,470 households in Temple Hills, of which 30.0% had children under the age of 18 living in them. Of all households, 21.9% were married-couple households, 23.0% were households with a male householder and no spouse or partner present, and 48.4% were households with a female householder and no spouse or partner present. About 37.7% of all households were made up of individuals and 10.0% had someone living alone who was 65 years of age or older.

There were 3,683 housing units, of which 5.8% were vacant. The homeowner vacancy rate was 1.9% and the rental vacancy rate was 5.8%.

=== 2000 census ===
At the 2000 census, there were 7,792 people, 3,156 households and 1,937 families residing in the CDP. The population density was 5,756.1 inhabitants per square mile (2,222.4/km^{2}). There were 3,388 housing units at an average density of 2,502.8 per square mile (966.3/km^{2}). The racial makeup of the CDP was 9.32% White, 85.01% African American, 0.21% Native American, 1.40% Asian, 0.15% Pacific Islander, 2.37% from other races, and 1.54% from two or more races. Hispanic or Latino of any race were 4.39% of the population.

There were 3,156 households, of which 36.7% had children under the age of 18 living with them, 28.8% were married couples living together, 27.1% had a female householder with no husband present, and 38.6% were non-families. 32.3% of all households were made up of individuals, and 3.2% had someone living alone who was 65 years of age or older. The average household size was 2.47 and the average family size was 3.11.

Age distribution was 29.6% under the age of 18, 10.2% from 18 to 24, 37.0% from 25 to 44, 18.3% from 45 to 64, and 4.9% who were 65 years of age or older. The median age was 30 years. For every 100 females, there were 82.9 males. For every 100 females age 18 and over, there were 74.2 males.

The median household income was $44,868 and the median family income was $49,318. Males had a median income of $35,192 compared with $32,500 for females. The per capita income for the CDP was $21,939. About 9.9% of families and 10.4% of the population were below the poverty line, including 16.4% of those under age 18 and 2.9% of those age 65 or over.

== Government ==
Prince George's County Police Department District 4 Station in Glassmanor CDP, with an Oxon Hill postal address, serves the community.

The United States Postal Service operates the Temple Hills Post Office in the Marlow Heights CDP, with a Temple Hills postal address. It also operates the Anacostia Carrier Annex in the Hillcrest Heights CDP, also with a Temple Hills postal address.

== Education ==
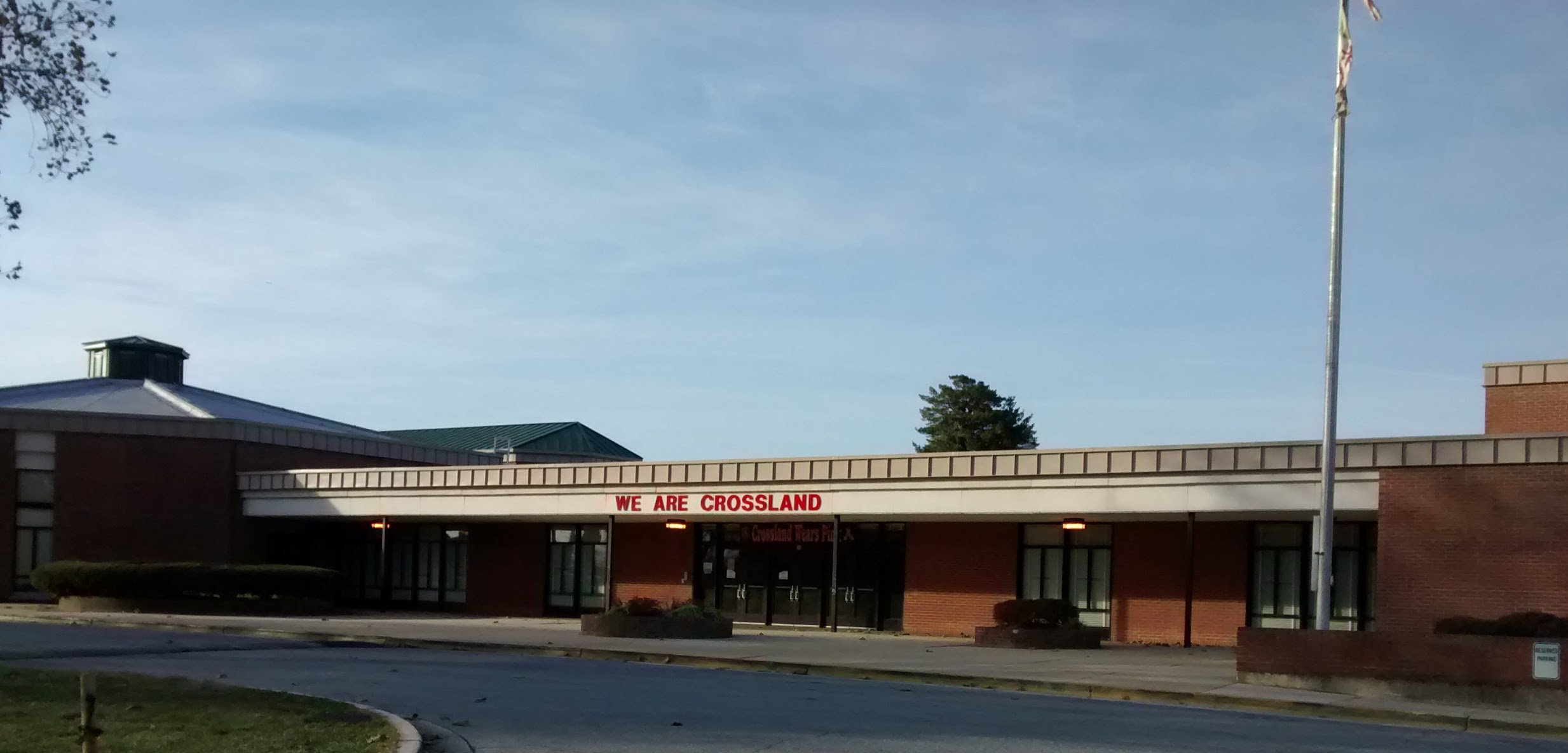
Crossland High School, which has a Temple Hills postal address and serves the Temple Hills CDP; it is physically in Camp Springs CDP

The CDP is served by the Prince George's County Public Schools district.

Samuel Chase and J. Frank Dent elementaries serve sections of the CDP. All residents of the CDP are zoned to Thurgood Marshall Middle School, and Crossland High School. Crossland High is physically in Camp Springs CDP and has a Temple Hills postal address.

== Notable people ==
- Mark Davis, radio talk show host and columnist, now in Dallas-Ft. Worth, grew up in Temple Hills
- Mike Easton, bantamweight for the Ultimate Fighting Championship
- Peter Bergman, actor on The Young and the Restless
- William T. Randall, (1915–2013) a Negro league baseball player
- Frank Small, Jr., member of U.S. House of Representatives Maryland's 5th District, 1953–1955, born in Temple Hills in 1896
- Julian Peterson, linebacker for the Detroit Lions
- Michael A. Jackson, former sheriff
- Rico Nasty, American rapper and singer
