= Camp Springs, Maryland =

- Census-designated place
- Location of Camp Springs, Maryland
- Coordinates: 38°48′27″N 76°55′5″W
- Country: United States
- State: Maryland
- County: Prince George's

Area
  - Total: 7.70 sq mi (19.93 km^{2})
  - Land: 7.68 sq mi (19.89 km^{2})
  - Water: 0.015 sq mi (0.04 km^{2})
- Elevation: 266 ft (81 m)

Population (2020)
  - Total: 22,734
  - Density: 2,960.2/sq mi (1,142.95/km^{2})
- Time zone: UTC−5 (Eastern (EST))
  - Summer (DST): UTC−4 (EDT)
- ZIP codes: 20746, 20748
- Area codes: 301, 240
- FIPS code: 24-12600
- GNIS feature ID: 0597172
- Website: www.campsprings.net

Camp Springs is an unincorporated area and census-designated place (CDP) in Prince George's County, Maryland, United States. The population was 22,734 at the 2020 census. Camp Springs is not an official post office designation; the area is divided among the surrounding mailing addresses of Temple Hills, Fort Washington, Clinton, and Suitland.

== History ==
The community of Camp Springs was settled in the mid-19th century at the crossroads of present-day Branch Avenue and Allentown Road. By 1860, the settlement contained several stores, a blacksmith shop, a school, Methodist church, and several residences. Early maps record the name of this settlement as Allentown, after the Allen family. The Allens were large landholders in the area, and the town, adjacent road, and Allenwood Elementary School were named in recognition of them. The town's popular name, and subsequently the name of its post office, was Camp Springs. According to local history, the community was called Camp Springs since soldiers en route to Fort Meade from the District of Columbia found the area to be a comfortable place to camp due to the abundant springs.

Throughout the late- 19th and early 20th centuries, the Camp Springs area did not experience significant growth. However, the opening of Andrews AFB on an adjacent tract of land, the proximity of the area to the District of Columbia, and a housing shortage after World War II made the Camp Springs area an ideal location for residential development.

Most of the development in the Camp Springs area occurred north of the Camp Springs crossroads in the 1940s and 1950s. The lack of water and sewer lines in most locations until the late 1950s and early 1960s kept the pace of development slow. The largest development in the 1940s was the subdivision of the Middleton farm north of Camp Springs. This farm was platted into Glenn Hills, Middleton Farm, and Middleton Valley. Guy Trueman built one of his many subdivisions in the mid-1940s by platting Trueman Heights on over 100 acres (0.40 km^{2}) in the northwest quadrant of the Camp Springs crossroads. Modest single-family houses were constructed along a fragmented grid of streets. Residential development during the 1950s primarily took the form of infill construction within subdivisions platted in the 1940s. One of the exceptions is the large Westchester Estates development located in the southwest quadrant of the Camp Springs crossroads. The over 400 houses were constructed along a curvilinear network of streets. Commercial development, consisting of shopping centers, restaurants, and hotels, extends along Allentown Road east of Branch Avenue. The largest boom of construction occurred in the 1960s and 1970s after the completion of water and sewer lines and the construction of the Capital Beltway. Pyles Lumber Company, a historic lumber business at the crossroads, was destroyed by fire on December 27, 2000. The 19th century crossroads vanished during the 20th century with the reconstruction of Branch Avenue into a limited-access divided highway, and extensive commercial and residential development.

== Geography ==
Camp Springs is located at 38°48′27″N 76°55′05″W. According to the United States Census Bureau, the CDP has a total area of 7.7 square miles (20.0 km^{2}), of which 0.02 square miles (0.04 km^{2}), or 0.19%, is water.

Joint Base Andrews, home base of the Air Force Systems Command and the official presidential airplane Air Force One, is adjacent to Camp Springs, and the base in particular, along with federal jobs in Washington, D.C., were major reasons for the community's original development. The Capital Beltway passes through the area, and the Washington Metro Branch Avenue station, southern terminus of the Green Line, is located nearby. The Maryland-National Capital Park and Planning Commission operates a year-round indoor and outdoor public swimming pool on Allentown Road. The Camp Springs Senior Activity Center is housed in the former Camp Springs Elementary School. From the Heart Church Ministries has an average weekly attendance of 7,000 worshippers.

=== Climate ===
The climate in this area is characterized by hot, humid summers and generally mild to cool winters. According to the Köppen Climate Classification system, Camp Springs has a humid subtropical climate, abbreviated "Cfa" on climate maps.

== Demographics ==
Historical population
Census	Pop.	Note	%±
1970	22,776		—
1980	16,118		−29.2%
1990	16,392		1.7%
2000	17,968		9.6%
2010	19,096		6.3%
2020	22,734		19.1%
U.S. Decennial Census; 2010 2020

=== Racial and ethnic composition ===
Camp Springs CDP, Maryland – Racial and ethnic composition Note: the US Census treats Hispanic/Latino as an ethnic category. This table excludes Latinos from the racial categories and assigns them to a separate category. Hispanics/Latinos may be of any race.
Race / Ethnicity (NH = Non-Hispanic)	Pop 2000	Pop 2010	Pop 2020	% 2000	% 2010	% 2020
White alone (NH)	3,456	1,739	1,362	19.23%	9.11%	5.99%
Black or African American alone (NH)	13,281	14,876	16,847	73.91%	77.90%	74.10%
Native American or Alaska Native alone (NH)	63	45	62	0.35%	0.24%	0.27%
Asian alone (NH)	419	441	437	2.33%	2.31%	1.92%
Native Hawaiian or Pacific Islander alone (NH)	12	13	16	0.07%	0.07%	0.07%
Other race alone (NH)	22	41	177	0.12%	0.21%	0.78%
Mixed race or Multiracial (NH)	276	368	712	1.54%	1.93%	3.13%
Hispanic or Latino (any race)	439	1,573	3,121	2.44%	8.24%	13.73%
Total	17,968	19,096	22,734	100.00%	100.00%	100.00%

=== 2020 census ===
As of the 2020 census, Camp Springs had a population of 22,734. The median age was 40.4 years. 18.9% of residents were under the age of 18 and 17.1% of residents were 65 years of age or older. For every 100 females there were 87.8 males, and for every 100 females age 18 and over there were 83.7 males age 18 and over.

100.0% of residents lived in urban areas, while 0.0% lived in rural areas.

There were 8,608 households in Camp Springs, of which 27.6% had children under the age of 18 living in them. Of all households, 35.8% were married-couple households, 20.2% were households with a male householder and no spouse or partner present, and 38.0% were households with a female householder and no spouse or partner present. About 28.6% of all households were made up of individuals and 8.4% had someone living alone who was 65 years of age or older.

There were 9,114 housing units, of which 5.6% were vacant. The homeowner vacancy rate was 1.0% and the rental vacancy rate was 9.8%.

=== 2000 census ===
As of the census of 2000, there were 17,968 people, 6,210 households, and 4,831 families residing in the CDP. The population density was 2,475.9 inhabitants per square mile (956.0/km^{2}). There were 6,494 housing units at an average density of 894.8 per square mile (345.5/km^{2}). The racial makeup of the CDP was 20.07% White, 74.28% African American, 0.40% Native American, 2.33% Asian, 0.07% Pacific Islander, 1.07% from other races, and 1.79% from two or more races. Hispanic or Latino of any race were 2.44% of the population, but may have increased in recent years.

There were 6,210 households, out of which 32.4% had children under the age of 18 living with them, 54.7% were married couples living together, 17.7% had a female householder with no husband present, and 22.2% were non-families. 18.0% of all households were made up of individuals, and 5.5% had someone living alone who was 65 years of age or older. The average household size was 2.89 and the average family size was 3.24.

In the CDP, the population was spread out, with 25.4% under the age of 18, 7.0% from 18 to 24, 27.3% from 25 to 44, 28.9% from 45 to 64, and 11.5% who were 65 years of age or older. The median age was 39 years. For every 100 females, there were 92.5 males. For every 100 females age 18 and over, there were 87.6 males.

The median income for a household in the CDP was $69,371, and the median income for a family was $76,495. Males had a median income of $43,135 versus $39,736 for females. The per capita income for the CDP was $27,474. About 2.0% of families and 3.3% of the population were below the poverty line, including 3.1% of those under age 18 and 3.2% of those age 65 or over.

== Government ==
Prince George's County Police Department District 4 Station in Glassmanor CDP, with an Oxon Hill postal address, serves the community.

== Education ==
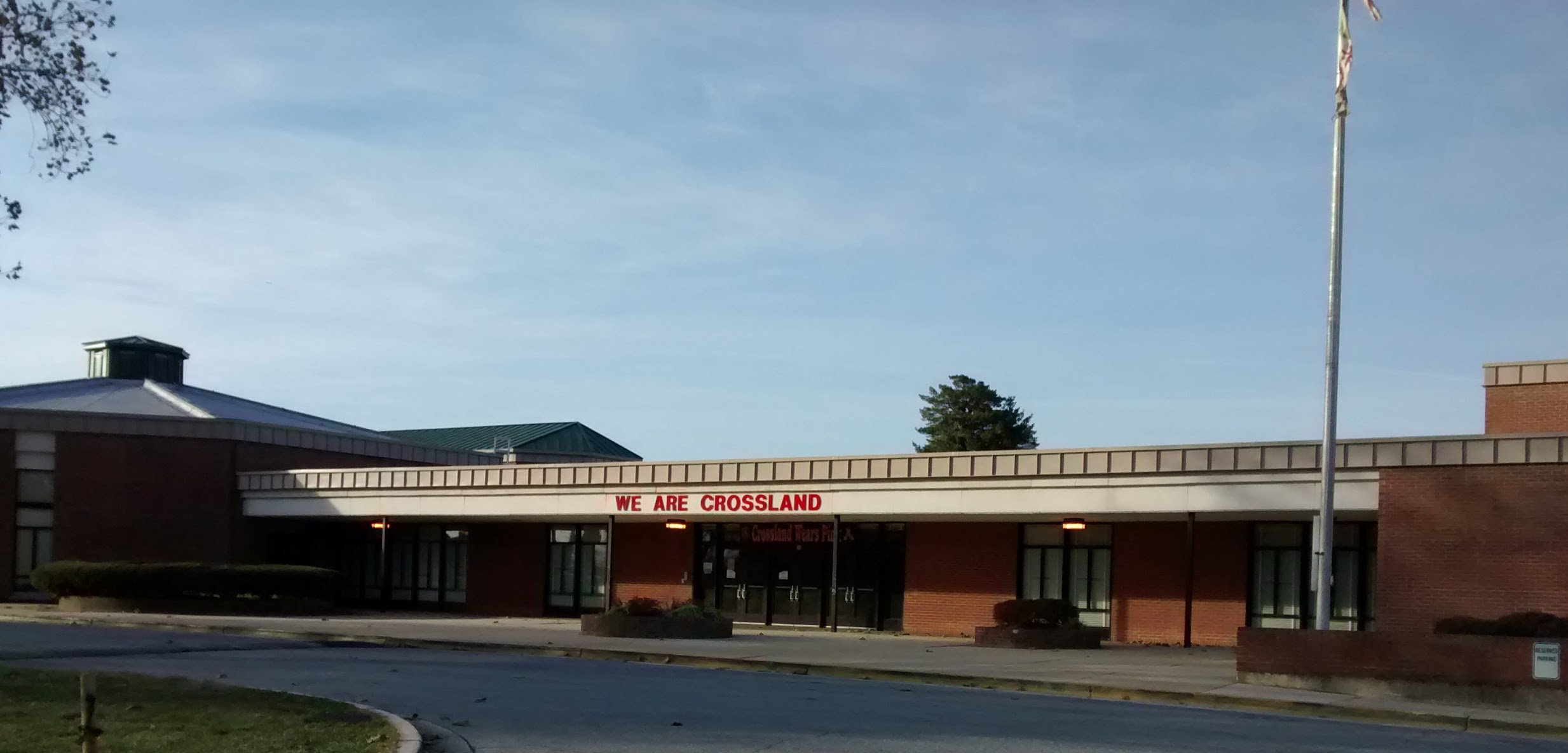
Crossland High School in the CDP

The CDP is served by the Prince George's County Public Schools district.

Elementary schools serving sections of the CDP include Allenwood, Avalon, William Beanes, Hillcrest Heights, and Princeton. Middle schools serving sections of the CDP include Thurgood Marshall, Isaac J. Gourdine, and Drew-Freeman. Much of the CDP is zoned to Crossland High School, with some portions zoned to Dr. Henry A. Wise High School.

Middleton Valley Elementary School previously served the Camp Springs CDP. It closed in 2010.

Skyline Elementary School was previously in the CDP, until its 2016 closure. Students were to be sent to Beanes Elementary. Until its closing it had a program for autistic students.
