= Suitland-Silver Hill, Maryland =

- Former census-designated place
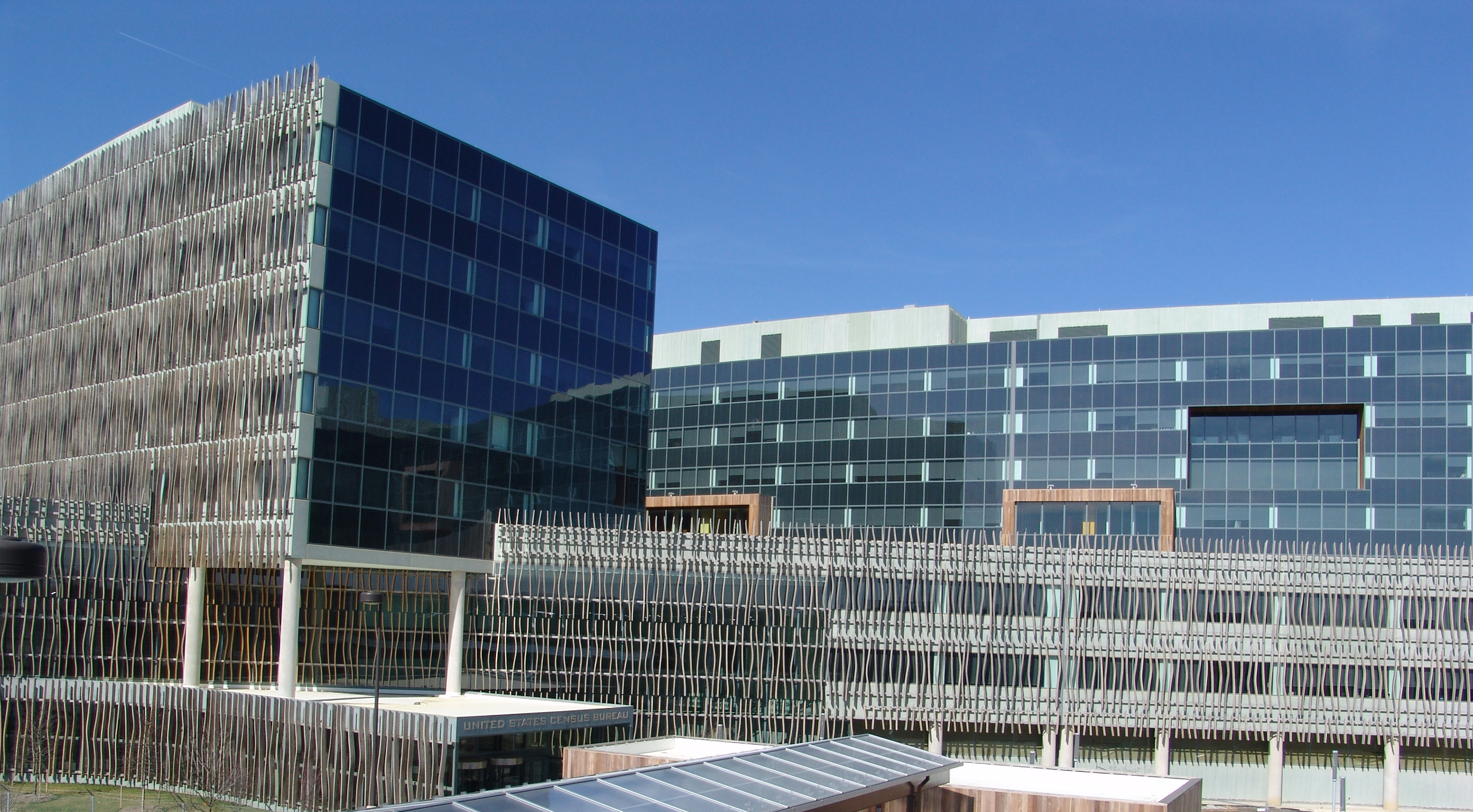
- The United States Census Bureau headquarters in March 2007.

- Location of Suitland-Silver Hill, Maryland
- Coordinates: 38°51′2″N 76°55′25″W
- Country: United States
- State: Maryland
- County: Prince George's

Area
  - Total: 5.6 sq mi (14.4 km^{2})
  - Land: 5.6 sq mi (14.4 km^{2})
  - Water: 0 sq mi (0.0 km^{2})

Population (2000)
  - Total: 33,515
  - Density: 6,008/sq mi (2,319.7/km^{2})
- Time zone: UTC−5 (Eastern (EST))
  - Summer (DST): UTC−4 (EDT)
- FIPS code: 24-75762

Suitland-Silver Hill was a census-designated place in Prince George's County, Maryland prior to the 2010 United States census. It is approximately one mile (1.6 km) southeast of Washington, D.C., 10 miles from Alexandria, Virginia and 8.3 miles from National Harbor, Maryland. It is now split into the Silver Hill census designated place and the Suitland census designated place.

Suitland Federal Center houses the national headquarters of the United States Census Bureau, among other government agencies.

== Geography ==
Suitland-Silver Hill is located at 38°51′2″N 76°55′25″W (38.850462, −76.923742).

According to the United States Census Bureau, the CDP had a total area of 5.6 square miles (15 km^{2}), all of it land.

== Demographics ==
Historical population
| Census | Pop. | Note | %± |
|---|---|---|---|
| 1970 | 30,355 | | — |
| 1980 | 32,164 | | 6.0% |
| 1990 | 35,111 | | 9.2% |
| 2000 | 33,515 | | −4.5% |
| 2010 | 31,775 | | −5.2% |

Suitland-Silver Hill CDP, Maryland – Racial and ethnic composition Note: the US Census treats Hispanic/Latino as an ethnic category. This table excludes Latinos from the racial categories and assigns them to a separate category. Hispanics/Latinos may be of any race.
| Race / Ethnicity (NH = Non-Hispanic) | Pop 2000 | % 2000 |
|---|---|---|
| White alone (NH) | 1,404 | 3.29% |
| Black or African American alone (NH) | 30,994 | 92.48% |
| Native American or Alaska Native alone (NH) | 95 | 0.28% |
| Asian alone (NH) | 200 | 0.60% |
| Native Hawaiian or Pacific Islander alone (NH) | 5 | 0.01% |
| Other race alone (NH) | 26 | 0.08% |
| Mixed race or Multiracial (NH) | 466 | 1.39% |
| Hispanic or Latino (any race) | 625 | 1.86% |
| Total | 33,515 | 100.00% |

As of the census of 2000, there were 33,515 people, 13,149 households, and 8,652 families residing in the CDP. The population density was 6,008.0 inhabitants per square mile (2,319.7/km^{2}). There were 14,379 housing units at an average density of 2,577.6 per square mile (995.2/km^{2}). The racial makeup of the CDP was 3.86% White, 93.01% African American, 0.31% Native American, 0.60% Asian, 0.03% Pacific Islander, 0.64% from other races, and 1.56% from two or more races. Hispanic or Latino of any race were 1.86% of the population.

There were 13,149 households, out of which 39.9% had children under the age of 18 living with them, 25.8% were married couples living together, 33.5% had a female householder with no husband present, and 34.2% were non-families. 27.5% of all households were made up of individuals, and 4.4% had someone living alone who was 65 years of age or older. The average household size was 2.55 and the average family size was 3.08.

In the CDP, the population was spread out, with 32.2% under the age of 18, 9.8% from 18 to 24, 34.8% from 25 to 44, 18.3% from 45 to 64, and 5.0% who were 65 years of age or older. The median age was 30 years. For every 100 females, there were 78.7 males. For every 100 females age 18 and over, there were 70.0 males.

The median income for a household in the CDP was $41,870, and the median income for a family was $43,635. Males had a median income of $33,633 versus $31,460 for females. The per capita income for the CDP was $19,031. About 9.3% of families and 10.7% of the population were below the poverty line, including 14.2% of those under age 18 and 9.5% of those age 65 or over.

== Transportation ==
The community is served by three Washington Metro stations Naylor Road, Suitland and Branch Avenue on the Green Line (Washington Metro).

== Education ==
The area is served by Prince George's County Public Schools, and zoned to Suitland High School, Drew Freeman Middle School, Suitland Elementary School.

== Notable people ==
- Steny Hoyer, member of the United States House of Representatives, attended Suitland High School.
