= Crossland High School =

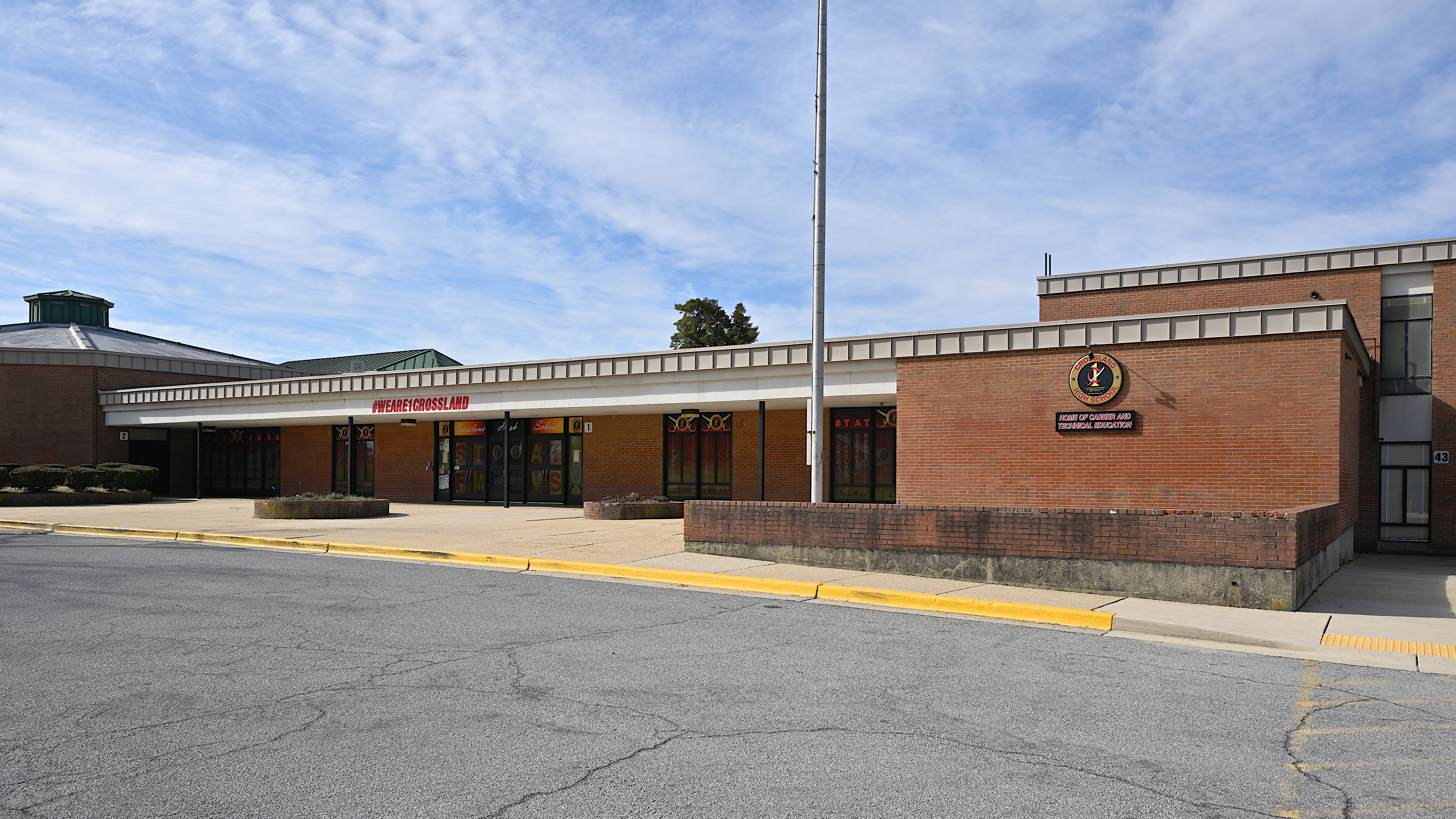

Location
- 6901 Temple Hill Road; Temple Hills, Maryland; United States; 38°47′41″N 76°55′49″W

Information
- Type: Public
- School district: Prince George's County Public Schools
- Principal: Michael Gilchrist
- Faculty: 97.0 (on FTE basis)
- Grades: 9–12
- Enrollment: 1,224
- Student to teacher ratio: 20.8
- Colors: Red, gold, black and white
- Mascot: Cavaliers
- Website: pgcps.org/crossland/

Crossland High School is a public secondary school located in Camp Springs census-designated place, unincorporated Prince George's County, Maryland, with Temple Hills postal address. The school serves about 2,000 students in grades 9 to 12 in the Prince George's County Public Schools system.

Crossland is named after a prominent early Maryland family.

The vocational wing was dedicated by President Lyndon Baines Johnson in 1967.

Crossland serves: much of Camp Springs CDP, all of Temple Hill CDP, and portions of Hillcrest Heights, Marlow Heights, Oxon Hill, and Silver Hill CDPs.

== In popular culture ==
The high school in the Diary of a Wimpy Kid series is named Crossland High School.

== Safety ==
In 2022, Crossland High School was one of the four schools in PGCPS that faced bomb threats.

== Notable alumni ==
- Jess Atkinson, Class of 1980, placekicker for the University of Maryland and Washington Redskins
- Peter Bergman, daytime television actor, CBS' The Young and the Restless; class of 1971
- Mark Davis, Dallas radio talk show host and newspaper columnist; class of 1975
- Pierre Edwards (born May 7, 1967) known as Pierre, is an American actor, director, writer, and stand-up comedian
- J. G. Hertzler, Class of 1968, actor, Star Trek: Deep Space Nine - Klingon General & Martok
- Michael A. Jackson, Maryland State Senator
- Kevin Merida, executive editor, Los Angeles Times
- Julian Peterson, NFL football player
- Tank, R&B singer
- Walt "The Wizard" Williams, NBA basketball player
