= Marlow Heights Shopping Center =

Open-air shopping complex in Maryland

Coordinates: 38°50′7″N 76°56′43″W

The Marlow Heights Shopping Center is an open-air shopping complex located in Marlow Heights, Maryland, on Branch Avenue (Maryland Route 5) at St. Barnabas Road (Maryland Route 414), and is positioned just south of Shops at Iverson.

== History ==
The 28,000-square-foot (2,600 m^{2}) Giant Food store opened at the $10 million shopping center on 36 acres (150,000 m^{2}) with 250,000 square feet (23,000 m^{2}) of store space, on September 16, 1957. At the time it opened it was the largest and most expensive shopping center in the Washington, D.C., area.

On August 29, 1960, Maryland Gov J. Millard Tawes opened the Hecht Company's new $4.5 million, 168,000-square-foot (15,600 m^{2}) store. This was the fifth Hecht Company store to open in the Washington, D.C., area. This addition to the original center expanded the site to 41 acres (170,000 m^{2}). Smaller shops included a Bond Stores outlet.

The Hot Shoppes restaurant at Marlow Heights was the final location in the chain to close (on December 2, 1999).

In early January 2021, it was announced that the Marlow Heights Macy's would be closing in Spring 2021.

== Anchors and major retailers ==
- Giant Food
- Macy's - formerly Hecht Company (closed 2021)
