= The Shops at Iverson =

Coordinates: 38°50′19″N 76°56′55″W

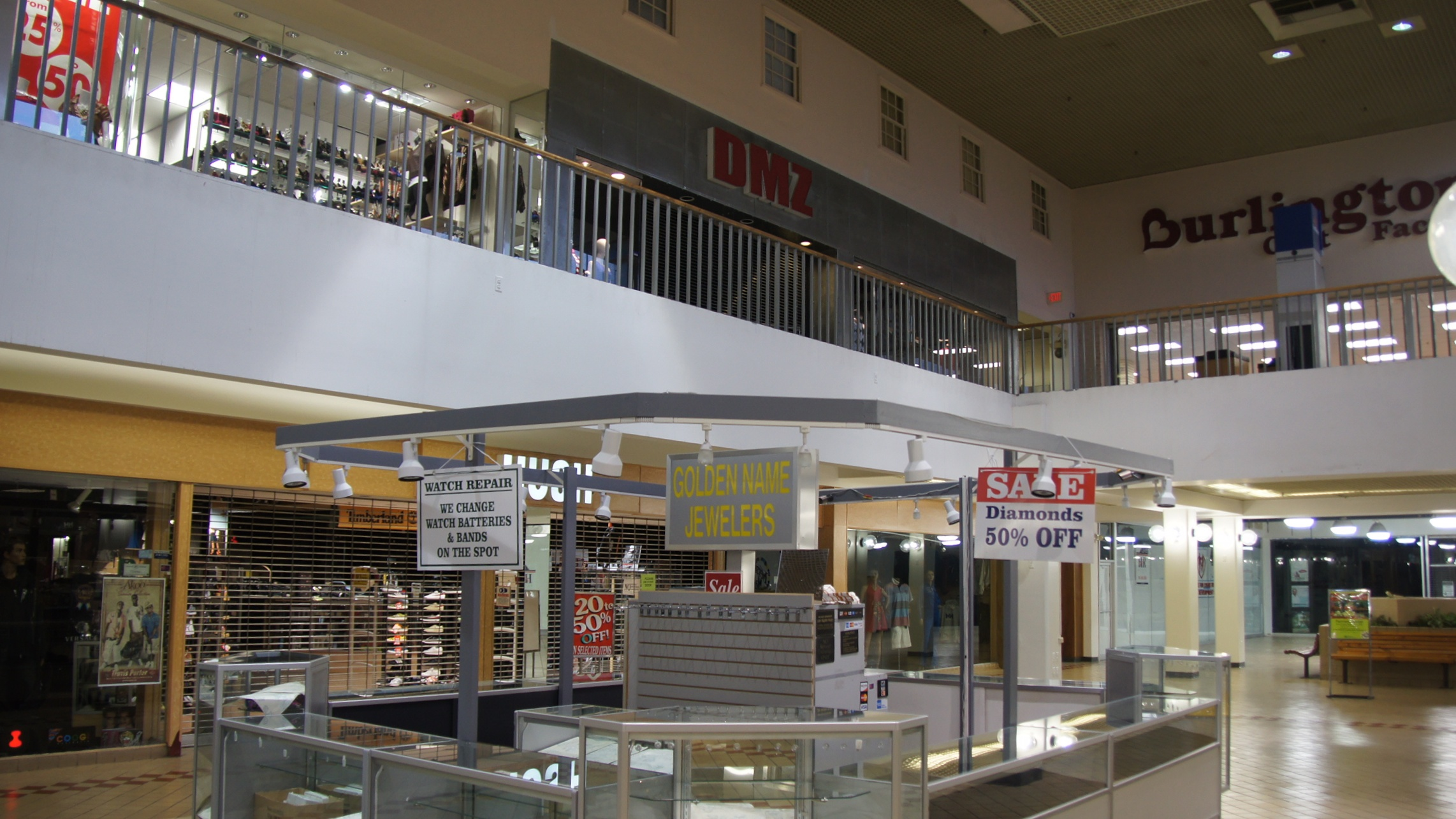
- Iverson Mall in 2011
- Location: Hillcrest Heights, Maryland
- Opened: 1967
- Manager: H&R Retail, Inc.
- Owner: America's Realty LLC
- Num. of anchor tenants: 3
- Floor area: 527,000 square feet
- Floors: 2
- Public transit: TheBus: P83, P86; Metrobus: P93, P94, P96
- Website: The Shops at Iverson

The Shops at Iverson is a shopping mall located at the intersection of Branch Avenue (Maryland Route 5) and Iverson Street (Maryland Route 458), in Hillcrest Heights, Maryland, just north of the Marlow Heights Shopping Center. Originally named Iverson Mall, it was the first shopping mall in the Washington, D.C., area to be built fully enclosed and climate controlled.

== History ==
The Montgomery Ward (165,000 sq ft.) store opened on April 20, 1967, when former Maryland Gov. J. Millard Tawes cut the ceremonial ribbon. The second anchor of the two anchor mall, Woodward & Lothrop, opened its store in the Spring of 1967. With both anchors in place and 60 stores, the grand opening of the $10 million, 500,000-square-foot (46,000 m^{2}) center occurred September 21, 1967. The mall straddles Iverson Street, which bisects the structure, and attached to the front of the mall is a four-story office building. Originally built as a regional shopping center, it declined after the opening of nearby Landover Mall in 1972. All fountains were removed during the 1985 remodeling. By the mid-1990s, Woodward and Lothrop had closed, and in 2001, Montgomery Ward would close after the chain went bankrupt; both stores were replaced with discount department stores. In 2008, the mall adopted a new slogan and advertising campaign, "You Can Find it All --- at Iverson Mall." In 2016, the mall's new owners drew up plans for a $30 million renovation, funded partly by a loan from the county's Economic Development Incentive Fund. Under the plan, the mall would be more outward-facing, with a "main street" atmosphere and outside access to some restaurants. Completion of the renovation was expected by the 3rd quarter of 2017, with the mall having a new wood and glass facade, energy efficient upgrades, new lighting, a new security system, and new restrooms. Plans also include 75,000 square feet of office space.

On June 10, 2022, three people were injured after being shot near the mall entrance.

== Anchor stores ==
- Shoppers World
- Forman Mills
- Roses
