= Hillcrest Heights, Maryland =

- CDP
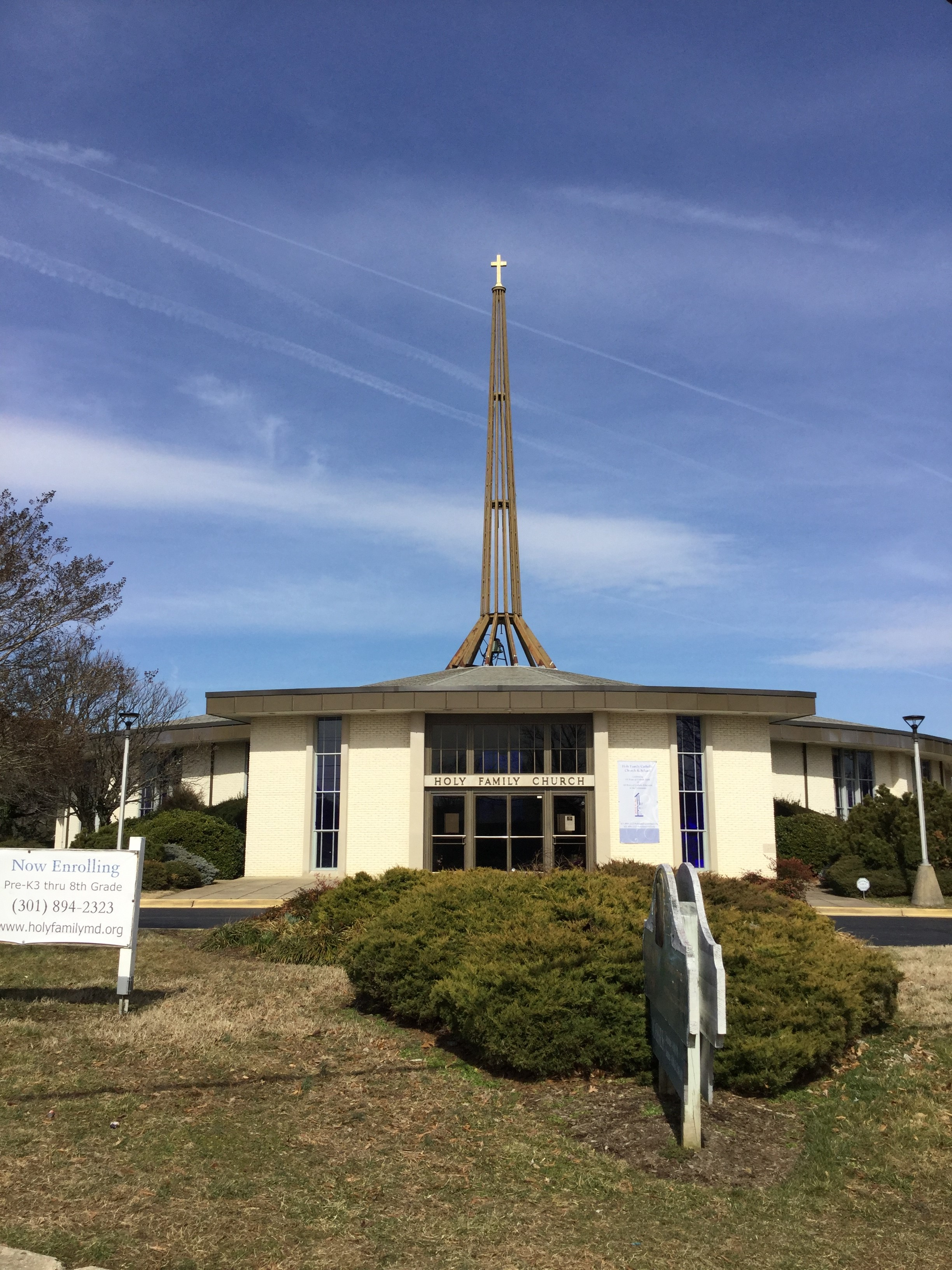
- Holy Family Catholic Church at 2210 Calloway Street in Hillcrest Heights, MD
- Nickname: Hillcrest
- Location of Hillcrest Heights, Maryland
- Coordinates: 38°50′18″N 76°57′35″W
- Country: United States
- State: Maryland
- County: Prince George's

Area
  - Total: 2.49 sq mi (6.45 km^{2})
  - Land: 2.49 sq mi (6.44 km^{2})
  - Water: 0.0039 sq mi (0.01 km^{2})
- Elevation: 279 ft (85 m)

Population (2020)
  - Total: 15,793
  - Density: 6,350.4/sq mi (2,451.92/km^{2})
- Time zone: UTC−5 (Eastern (EST))
  - Summer (DST): UTC−4 (EDT)
- ZIP codes: 20746, 20748
- Area codes: 301, 240
- FIPS code: 24-38975
- GNIS feature ID: 0597552

Hillcrest Heights is an unincorporated area and census-designated place (CDP) in Prince George's County, Maryland, United States. The population was 15,793 at the 2020 census. For mailing address purposes, it is part of the community of Temple Hills and is also near Suitland.

== Geography ==
Hillcrest Heights is located at 38°50′18″N 76°57′35″W (38.838212, -76.959795).

According to the United States Census Bureau, the CDP has a total area of 2.4 square miles (6.2 km^{2}), all land.

Hillcrest Heights borders the adjacent communities of Marlow Heights, Silver Hill, Suitland, and Glassmanor.

Hillcrest Heights consists mainly of single-family rambler homes and duplex homes built in the 1950s and 1960s. Iverson Mall, a midsize two-level shopping mall which opened in 1967, serves shoppers from Maryland communities as well as from the Anacostia section of Washington. Adjacent to the mall is the older Marlow Heights Shopping Center. Stations of the Metrorail Green Line are nearby. Also nearby are the U.S. Census Bureau in Suitland and, farther out, Joint Base Andrews and the Capital Beltway. The neighborhood is also convenient to Capitol Hill.

== Demographics ==
Historical population
Census	Pop.	Note	%±
2000	16,359		—
2010	16,469		0.7%
2020	15,793		−4.1%
U.S. Decennial Census; 2010 2020

=== Racial and ethnic composition ===
Hillcrest Heights CDP, Maryland – Racial and ethnic composition Note: the US Census treats Hispanic/Latino as an ethnic category. This table excludes Latinos from the racial categories and assigns them to a separate category. Hispanics/Latinos may be of any race.
Race / Ethnicity (NH = Non-Hispanic)	Pop 2000	Pop 2010	Pop 2020	% 2000	% 2010	% 2020
White alone (NH)	711	356	300	4.35%	2.16%	1.90%
Black or African American alone (NH)	15,174	15,167	13,672	92.76%	92.09%	86.57%
Native American or Alaska Native alone (NH)	18	41	43	0.11%	0.25%	0.27%
Asian alone (NH)	57	72	127	0.35%	0.44%	0.80%
Native Hawaiian or Pacific Islander alone (NH)	0	2	3	0.00%	0.01%	0.02%
Other race alone (NH)	17	15	70	0.10%	0.09%	0.44%
Mixed race or Multiracial (NH)	200	228	374	1.22%	1.38%	2.37%
Hispanic or Latino (any race)	182	588	1,204	1.11%	3.57%	7.62%
Total	16,359	16,469	15,793	100.00%	100.00%	100.00%

=== 2020 census ===
As of the 2020 census, Hillcrest Heights had a population of 15,793. The median age was 39.0 years. 19.2% of residents were under the age of 18 and 16.7% of residents were 65 years of age or older. For every 100 females there were 86.7 males, and for every 100 females age 18 and over there were 82.0 males age 18 and over.

100.0% of residents lived in urban areas, while 0.0% lived in rural areas.

There were 6,735 households in Hillcrest Heights, of which 26.5% had children under the age of 18 living in them. Of all households, 23.7% were married-couple households, 23.1% were households with a male householder and no spouse or partner present, and 45.6% were households with a female householder and no spouse or partner present. About 34.7% of all households were made up of individuals and 11.3% had someone living alone who was 65 years of age or older.

There were 7,182 housing units, of which 6.2% were vacant. The homeowner vacancy rate was 1.6% and the rental vacancy rate was 7.6%.

=== 2000 census ===
As of the census of 2000, there were 16,359 people, 6,752 households, and 4,206 families residing in the CDP. The population density was 6,724.2 inhabitants per square mile (2,596.2/km^{2}). There were 7,190 housing units at an average density of 2,955.4 per square mile (1,141.1/km^{2}). The racial makeup of the CDP was 4.58% White, 93.18% African American, 0.12% Native American, 0.35% Asian, 0.01% Pacific Islander, 0.32% from other races, and 1.44% from two or more races. Hispanic or Latino of any race were 1.11% of the population.

There were 6,752 households, out of which 28.1% had children under the age of 18 living with them, 29.2% were married couples living together, 27.0% had a female householder with no husband present, and 37.7% were non-families. 32.5% of all households were made up of individuals, and 5.7% had someone living alone who was 65 years of age or older. The average household size was 2.42 and the average family size was 3.06.

In the CDP, the population was spread out, with 25.4% under the age of 18, 8.7% from 18 to 24, 30.3% from 25 to 44, 26.1% from 45 to 64, and 9.5% who were 65 years of age or older. The median age was 36 years. For every 100 females, there were 83.2 males. For every 100 females age 18 and over, there were 75.4 males.

The median income for a household in the CDP was $46,367, and the median income for a family was $52,573. Males had a median income of $34,198 versus $34,558 for females. The per capita income for the CDP was $22,620. About 6.7% of families and 7.4% of the population were below the poverty line, including 9.0% of those under age 18 and 11.5% of those age 65 or over.

== History ==
Much of the community was originally an estate, Colebrook, purchased in 1671 by Thomas Dent and William Hatton, and then in 1688 by Colonel John Addison. Colebrook Manor, the family homestead of the Addisons, was built in 1808, located in Oxon Run Valley, 2/5 of a mile southeast of the Washington, D.C. line.

== Government ==
Prince George's County Police Department District 4 Station in Glassmanor CDP, with an Oxon Hill postal address, serves the community.

The United States Postal Service operates the Anacostia Carrier Annex in the Hillcrest Heights CDP, with a Temple Hills postal address.

== Education ==
The CDP is served by the Prince George's County Public Schools district.

Sections are served by Hillcrest Heights and Panorama elementary schools. All residents are zoned to Benjamin Stoddert Middle School. Most areas are zoned to Potomac High School with some zoned to Crossland High School. There is also a special education school, Jessie B. Mason Regional School, formerly Hillcrest Heights Special Center.

G. Gardner Shugart Middle School was previously in Hillcrest Heights. Shugart was scheduled to close in 2009. According to a Washington Post article written by Nelson Hernandez, Shugart, in which 35% of its students passed a State of Maryland mathematics proficiency test and which underwent a restructuring required by State of Maryland authorities, "is among the schools with long-standing academic problems".

Holy Family Catholic School, a Catholic pre-K to Grade 8 school, is in Hillcrest Heights. The school, on an 11-acre (4.5 ha) campus, opened in 1957. The school closed at the end of the 2019–2020 school year.
