= Suitland, Maryland =

- Census-designated place
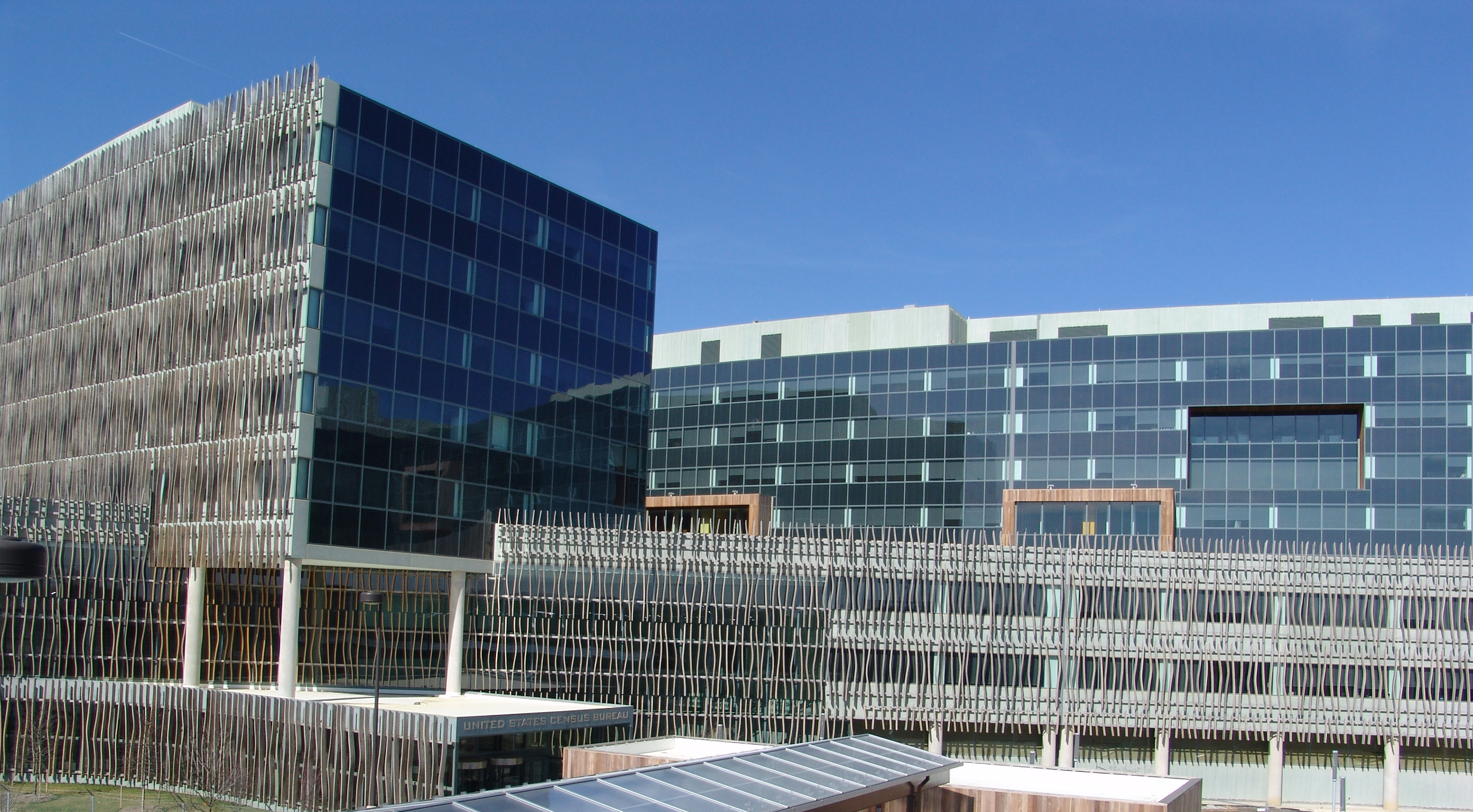
- The headquarters of the United States Census Bureau in March 2007

- Location of Suitland in Maryland Suitland, Maryland (the United States)
- Coordinates: 38°50′55″N 76°55′28″W
- Country: United States
- State: Maryland
- County: Prince George's

Area
  - Total: 4.25 sq mi (11.01 km^{2})
  - Land: 4.25 sq mi (11.00 km^{2})
  - Water: 0.0039 sq mi (0.01 km^{2})
- Elevation: 290 ft (88 m)

Population (2020)
  - Total: 25,839
  - Density: 6,085.2/sq mi (2,349.49/km^{2})
- Time zone: UTC−5 (Eastern (EST))
  - Summer (DST): UTC−4 (EDT)
- ZIP Codes: 20746, 20747
- Area codes: 301, 240
- FIPS code: 24-75725

Suitland is a census designated place (CDP) in Prince George's County, Maryland. Suitland is located approximately 1 mile (1.6 km) southeast of Washington, D.C.. As of the 2020 census, its population was 25,839. Prior to 2010, it was part of the Suitland-Silver Hill census-designated place.

== History ==
Suitland is named after 19th century landowner and businessman Senator Samuel Taylor Suit, whose estate, "Suitland,” was located near the present-day intersection of Suitland and Silver Hill Roads.

=== 17th and 18th centuries ===
In the 1600s, the Piscataway tribe inhabited the lands in southern Maryland. European settlers first visited Saint Clement's Island on the Potomac River and then established their first Maryland colony downriver at Saint Mary's City in 1634, and by the 1660s through the 1680s, settlers had moved into what is now known as Prince George's County. Faced with this encroachment, the Piscataways left the area in 1697, and moved north to present-day Coney Island, New York. They eventually moved further north into Pennsylvania and Michigan. The sole export of the European settlers was tobacco, and slaves were first brought to the county in the 1700s.

=== 19th century ===
Prior to the Civil War, tobacco production had made Prince George's County one of the wealthiest counties in Maryland, and half of the county's population was enslaved. After the war, old plantations were broken up and replaced by communities centered on small farming and country villages.

In 1867, Samuel Taylor Suit moved to Maryland and purchased more than 800 acres (320 ha) near Washington, D.C. In the 1870s and 1880s, such prominent guests as U.S. Presidents Ulysses S. Grant and Rutherford B. Hayes visited the Suitland estate. It was the 1871 site of negotiations preliminary to the international tribunal in Geneva that arbitrated the Alabama Claims. After Suit's death in 1888, portions of the estate were sold (circa 1892 to 1903) to William A. Harrison, and the land was subsequently subdivided and sold over the years. Suit's son, Arthur B. Suit, retained three acres (1.2 ha) of land near the corner of Suitland and Silver Hill Roads, where he maintained a general store, a bar, a bowling alley, and the community's one-room jailhouse.

=== 20th century ===
By the turn of the century, the village of Suitland had added a post office, churches, and several houses. On August 10, 1909, local residents met at the home of George J. Hess and organized the Suitland Improvement Association of Maryland to raise funds for a community meeting hall. Three officers were elected to serve one-year posts: President, Dr. C. M. Emmons; Vice President, C. L. Jenkins; and Secretary and Treasurer, George J. Hess. The Association was incorporated on November 17, 1950, and is now known as the Suitland Civic Association.

There are two historic cemeteries in Suitland: Cedar Hill and Lincoln Memorial. Cedar Hill Cemetery was founded in 1895 and built on the former Nonesuch Plantation. Prior to 1913, it was known as Forest Lake Cemetery and was likely renamed after the cedar trees that lined both sides of Suitland Road from the D.C. line to Silver Hill Road. Early churches performed baptisms at this location and it is also the burial site for victims of the 1906 Terra Cotta Railroad wreck. Lincoln Memorial Cemetery was founded in 1927 on the former Landon dairy farm and is the site where many prominent African-Americans are buried. Individuals include Dr. Charles Richard Drew, who established improved techniques for blood storage and developed large scale blood banks early in World War II, and Nannie Helen Burroughs, educator and civil rights activist.

The first one-room schoolhouse was built in 1891 on land purchased by the community. A two-room schoolhouse was later built in 1915 on Silver Hill Road, expanded to four rooms in 1922, and saw additions to the building in 1928, 1941, and 1957.

Property owned by James West and Joseph Friday, located near the current intersection of Swann and Silver Hill Roads, was used as an airfield from 1938 to 1941. Named "Skyhaven" by a local student who won the naming contest sponsored by West and Friday, Skyhaven Airfield hosted a flying club that served 20 small planes, including Wacos, Great Lakes, and Pipers.

Suitland remained a rural farming community until the onset of World War II. To meet the need for additional office space to support the war effort, in September 1941, the Public Buildings Administration awarded a $2,749,000 contract to McCloskey and Co. of Philadelphia to develop a new federal office building in Prince George's County, Maryland. Later that year, 437 acres (177 ha) of farm and dairy land were purchased in Suitland to build the Suitland Federal Center. The 12 existing residences on this property included the former dairy and summer home of Albert Carry, the German-American founder of the National Capital Brewing Company and Carry Ice Cream Co. Suitland House, built by Lowell O. Minear, a pioneer designer of memorial parks, is the sole remaining residence on the Federal Center property. A colonial-revival style home, it now serves as office space for the U.S. Census Bureau and is included in the Prince George's County Planning Department's 2010 Approved Historic Sites and Districts Plan.

In 1942, the Suitland Manor apartments were built in anticipation of new federal workers. Parkway Terrace, Whitehall Square, and Marlborough House developments soon followed to accommodate the influx of Census Bureau and other federal employees. In 1943, the Census Bureau turned 14 acres (5.7 ha) of land at the Federal Center site into the largest Victory Garden in the Washington metropolitan area. The land was a parceled into 616 plots and plowed, fertilized, and tended by census employees. As late as 1989, 110 garden plots were still available for summer rental on a first-come, first-served basis for $7.00 each. These gardens were located at the site of the current Naval Intelligence Building.

In 1944, the Suitland Parkway was opened to connect the Army's Bolling Air Force Base (Bolling Field) to the Camp Springs Army Military Reservation, later named Andrews Air Force Base and now known as Joint Base Andrews. The 9.35 miles (15.05 km) of highway, originally named the Fighter Command Station Access Parkway, was initially limited to military use only and came under the jurisdiction of the National Park Service in 1949.

Suitland Junior-Senior High School (now Suitland High School), was the first high school in Suitland. The building was dedicated on November 15, 1951, to the high ideal of freedom of education, with John W. McNamara presiding as master-of-ceremonies and principal Thomas Warthen accepting the dedication on behalf of the students and faculty. Nearby was also LaReine High School, offering a Roman Catholic education for girls. LaReine was eventually closed, and its students transferred to nearby Bishop McNamara High School which became co-educational.

The 1950s and 1960s were a period of major growth for Suitland, as new middle and working-class families settled into the newly built residential communities. However, this population boom came to an end around 1970 due to several converging factors. These included the availability of cheaper land and lower taxes in neighboring county jurisdictions; the ending of the postwar baby boom; the slowdown in the rate of federal government growth; and migration patterns spurred by school busing mandates leading to regional demographic shifts.

The 1970s were both the beginning of a period of population adjustment and a recognition of Suitland's unique local history. Beginning in 1973, Prince George's County became the largest school district to adopt a busing plan after the Supreme Court's ruling on Brown v. Board of Education. The demographic changes caused by desegregation busing changed the county, transforming a great number of neighborhoods that were formerly white and middle-class to majority black and middle-class, and these shifts are reflected in the current population demographic of the Suitland CDP.

In 1975, local historian Darlie Norton was elected to draft a local history of the township in preparation for Suitland's centennial celebration. A History of Suitland, Maryland, 1867–1976 (1976) includes a detailed history of early residents, businesses, land purchases, and the development of Suitland civic, public, and private enterprises. That same year, local resident Walter Coley organized a committee within the Suitland Civic Association to preserve the Suitland Bog, which led to the purchase of 20 acres (8.1 ha) of woods and wetland by the Maryland National Capitol Park and Planning Commission.

In the 1980s, crime associated with vandalism, property violations, landlord absenteeism, and drugs were seen as a threat to the federal workers who were now commuting into Suitland from outside the community, and in 1983, a razor wired fence was erected around the Federal Center complex. Through most of this decade, neighborhoods near the Federal Center remained distressed and in need of a plan for positive change and growth.

In the mid-1990s, county executive Wayne Curry conceived a plan to revitalize Suitland as part of a greater county-wide effort to improve townships located inside the Beltway. In 1997, as the first stage of the Prince George's County Redevelopment Authority project to reduce local crime rates and revitalize the site, the Manchester Square housing development was turned over to the county. Two years later, the fence surrounding the Federal Center was replaced with a regular wrought iron fence. Notoriously in 2003, two business women in their 70s were murdered during a robbery at their retail flower shop on Suitland Road. As of Spring 2019, most of the retail district along Suitland Road across from the Census Bureau has been torn down, with plans for building new residential/retail ventures finally moving forward.

=== 21st century ===
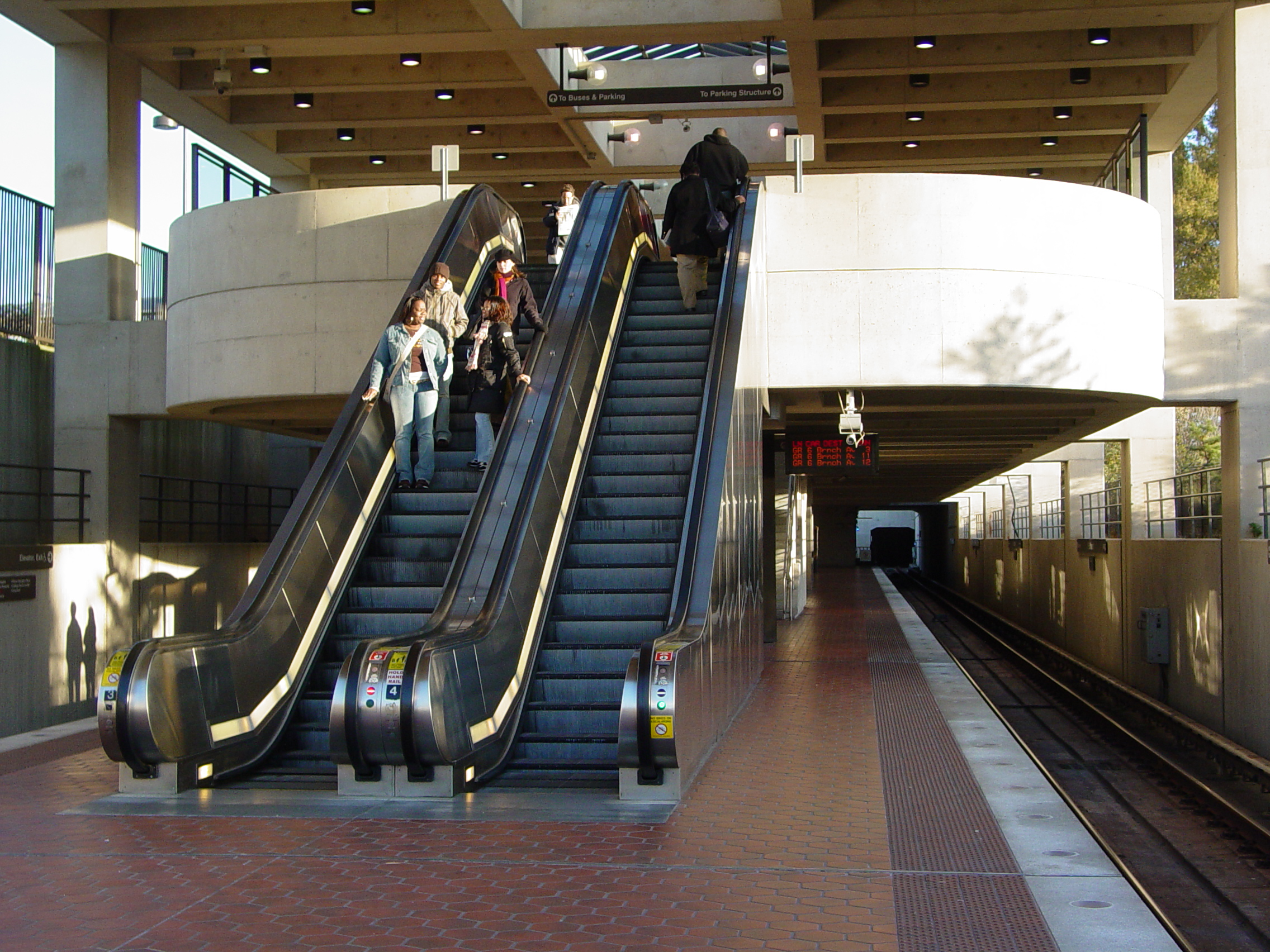
The Suitland Metro station in October 2006

The Suitland station on the Washington Metro's Green Line opened to the public January 13, 2001.

In 2004, Windsor Crossing, a $45 million multifamily condominium complex built by Stavrou Associates in partnership with the Prince George's Redevelopment Authority, was completed on the former Manchester Square development. In 2005, the $15.7 million Suitland Elementary School was opened to the public as part of the revitalization plan. The defense departments Base Realignment Commission initiatives resulted in major changes at Andrews Air Force Base with hundreds of new employment positions anticipated over the coming decades.

In 2006, multi-million-dollar federal renovations of the U.S. Census Building and National Oceanic and Atmospheric headquarters were completed. On October 1, 2009, Andrews Air Force Base, along with Naval Air Facility Washington, became a joint base known as Joint Base Andrews Naval Air Facility Washington, or Joint Base Andrews. Renovations were completed at the Spauldings Branch Library in 2012, which while located in District Heights, MD also serves Suitland and surrounding communities.

Recent developments in Suitland include a double-digit fall in crime rates and increased development in the surrounding county. These include National Harbor to the south, Konterra to the north, Joint Base Andrews to the east of town, and the continuing development and/or gentrification of southeast Washington D.C. to the west. Several currently under-utilized Metro Stations in or around Suitland promise further development, as does recent legislation permitting gaming/casinos to be located in National Harbor. Two more revitalization projects were announced to the public in 2012: the "Buy Suitland" initiative and the Green Suitland Neighborhood Stabilization Project.

The "Buy Suitland" initiative offers up to 5% purchase price to first time home buyers, up to 7% purchase price to local civic workers, or 35% of purchase price or $40,000 to debt-to-income candidates for properties located in 11 census tracts. Green Suitland NSP is allocating over $2 million for the purchase of foreclosed and abandoned homes to be rehabilitated with enviro-friendly, cost-saving upgrades before they are resold.

== Geography ==
As an unincorporated area, Suitland's boundaries are not officially defined. The U.S. Geological Survey locates the center of Suitland at 38°50'49"N 76°55'33"W. This area is roughly bounded by Southern Avenue (D.C. Line) to the north, Branch Avenue (MD 5) to the west, Pennsylvania Avenue (MD 4) to the east, and Donnell Drive/Suitland Parkway/Meadowbrook Drive (Henson Creek) to the south. Within the northeastern section of these boundaries lies the township of Morningside, MD and a small portion of another unincorporated area known as Forestville, MD.

According to the U.S. Census Bureau, Suitland has a total area of 4.2 square miles (11.0 km^{2}), a 25% reduction from the 2.2 square miles (5.6 km^{2}) used in previous years. While the Census Bureau defines the CDP as all land, the Suitland Bog and portions of Henson Creek, a tributary of the Potomac, are located off Suitland Parkway near the southern border of the CDP.

Suitland Bog is one of the last of the natural bogs in the D.C. region, which numbered approximately thirty before the onset of suburban development. This wetland ecosystem features sweet bay magnolias and other rare species of plants, including northern pitcher-plants, lady slipper orchids, sundews, and sphagnum moss.

=== Parks and recreation ===
There are two community recreation centers (Bradbury Heights Recreation Center and William Beanes Community Center) and 4 parks (Auth Village Neighborhood Park, Douglas Patterson Community Park, Dupont Heights Neighborhood Park, and Michael J. Polley Neighborhood Park) maintained by the Prince George's County Department of Parks and Recreation.

== Demographics ==
Historical population
| Census | Pop. | Note | %± |
|---|---|---|---|
| 1960 | 10,300 | | — |
| 1970 | 30,355 | | 194.7% |
| 1980 | 32,164 | | 6.0% |
| 1990 | 35,111 | | 9.2% |
| 2000 | 33,515 | | −4.5% |
| 2010 | 25,825 | | −22.9% |
| 2020 | 25,839 | | 0.1% |
U.S. Decennial Census; 2010 2020

Suitland first appeared as a census designated place in the 2010 U.S. census formed from part of the deleted Suitland-Silver Hill CDP.

=== Racial and ethnic composition ===
Suitland CDP, Maryland – Racial and ethnic composition Note: the US Census treats Hispanic/Latino as an ethnic category. This table excludes Latinos from the racial categories and assigns them to a separate category. Hispanics/Latinos may be of any race.
| Race / Ethnicity (NH = Non-Hispanic) | Pop 2010 | Pop 2020 | % 2010 | % 2020 |
|---|---|---|---|---|
| White alone (NH) | 450 | 489 | 1.74% | 1.89% |
| Black or African American alone (NH) | 23,569 | 22,424 | 91.26% | 86.78% |
| Native American or Alaska Native alone (NH) | 78 | 32 | 0.30% | 0.12% |
| Asian alone (NH) | 88 | 166 | 0.34% | 0.64% |
| Native Hawaiian or Pacific Islander alone (NH) | 6 | 1 | 0.02% | 0.00% |
| Other race alone (NH) | 23 | 87 | 0.09% | 0.34% |
| Mixed race or Multiracial (NH) | 387 | 615 | 1.50% | 2.38% |
| Hispanic or Latino (any race) | 1,224 | 2,025 | 4.74% | 7.84% |
| Total | 25,825 | 25,839 | 100.00% | 100.00% |

=== 2020 census ===
As of the 2020 census, Suitland had a population of 25,839. The median age was 34.7 years. 23.6% of residents were under the age of 18 and 11.8% of residents were 65 years of age or older. For every 100 females there were 80.4 males, and for every 100 females age 18 and over there were 75.1 males age 18 and over.

100.0% of residents lived in urban areas, while 0.0% lived in rural areas.

There were 10,638 households in Suitland, of which 32.5% had children under the age of 18 living in them. Of all households, 20.6% were married-couple households, 22.3% were households with a male householder and no spouse or partner present, and 49.6% were households with a female householder and no spouse or partner present. About 33.2% of all households were made up of individuals and 8.7% had someone living alone who was 65 years of age or older.

There were 11,414 housing units, of which 6.8% were vacant. The homeowner vacancy rate was 1.4% and the rental vacancy rate was 6.9%.

Racial composition as of the 2020 census
| Race | Number | Percent |
|---|---|---|
| White | 638 | 2.5% |
| Black or African American | 22,576 | 87.4% |
| American Indian and Alaska Native | 74 | 0.3% |
| Asian | 168 | 0.7% |
| Native Hawaiian and Other Pacific Islander | 5 | 0.0% |
| Some other race | 1,393 | 5.4% |
| Two or more races | 985 | 3.8% |

=== 2010 census ===
For the 2010 Census the boundaries of the Suitland CDP were changed reducing the land area by approx. 25%. As a result, the population count for 2010 shows a 22.9% decrease, with a population density increase of 4%.

As of the 2010 census, there were 25,825 people and 10,139 households residing in the Suitland CDP. The population density was 6,148 people per square mile. There were 10,805 housing units at an average density of 2,572 per square mile. The racial makeup of the community was 91.9% African American, 2.6% European American, 0.4% Native American, 0.3% Asian, 4.7% Latino, 1.7% from other races, and 2.1% from two or more races.

There were 10,139 households, out of which 3,682 were households with no family and 6,457 were identified as household with families. Of those households, 30.9% were married couples living together, 32.4% had a female householder, and 9% had a male householder. The average household size was 2.53 and the average family size was 3.19.

In the census area, the population was spread out, with 23.9% under the age of 18, 7.9% from 18 to 24, 30.5% from 25 to 44, 17.5% from 45 to 64, and 7.2% who were 65 years of age or older. The median age was 30.5 years.

The median income for a household in the census area was $56,217 and the median income for a family was $61,393. The per capita income for the area was $26,040. 7.4% (+/- 2.0%) of the population and 6.5% (+/-2.4%) of families were below the poverty line.

== Transportation ==
The major roads in Suitland are mostly two and three-lane highways. Suitland Parkway runs through the entirety of the Suitland CDP, and the Capital Beltway can be accessed from Pennsylvania Avenue (MD 4) and Branch Avenue (MD 5).

The community is served by the Washington Metro Naylor Road, Suitland and Branch Avenue stations (on the Green Line), respectively located at the intersections of Naylor Road and Branch Avenue, Silver Hill Road and Suitland Parkway then terminating between Auth Way and Capital Gateway Drive just off Branch Avenue and Auth Road.

=== Major highways ===
- Interstate 95 enters the county at Laurel. It joins with Interstate 495 (Capital Beltway) in College Park where it continues and leaves at the Woodrow Wilson Bridge over the Potomac River.
- Interstate 495 (Capital Beltway) enters the county near Adelphi, and joins Interstate 95 at the College Park Interchange here it continues and leaves at the Woodrow Wilson Bridge over the Potomac River.
- Maryland Route 4, also called Pennsylvania Avenue, runs from the Maryland–D.C. border eastward into Anne Arundel County and south in Calvert County.
- Maryland Route 5, also called Branch Avenue, runs from the Maryland–D.C. border southeast through Charles County into St. Mary's County.
- Maryland Route 458, also called Silver Hill Road, runs from Branch Avenue northeast to Walker Mill Road in District Heights
- Maryland Route 218, also called Suitland Road, runs from the Maryland–D.C. border east across Maryland Route 458 terminating at the front gate of Joint Base Andrews on Allentown Road.

== Government ==
Prince George's County Police Department District 3 Station in Landover CDP and District 4 Station in Glassmanor CDP, with an Oxon Hill postal address, serve the community.

The U.S. Postal Service operates the Suitland Post Office in the CDP.

== Education ==
=== Primary and secondary schools ===
Suitland is served by the county-wide public school system, Prince George's County Public Schools.

Elementary schools serving sections of Suitland include Suitland, William Beanes, Samuel P. Massie Academy, Andrew Jackson Academy, Francis Scott Key, and Bradbury Heights. Massie Academy, in Suitland CDP and with a Forestville address, was scheduled to open in August 2003.

Most residents are zoned to Drew-Freeman Middle School, while some are zoned to Samuel Massie Academy and Andrew Jackson Academy. Massie Elementary and Andrew Jackson Middle converted into K-8 academies in 2009.

All residents of the CDP are zoned to Suitland High School. Suitland High School is a public magnet school with specialized programs in the visual and performing arts, International Baccalaureate program, and vocational Technical Academy.

The district previously operated Berkshire Elementary School in what is now Suitland CDP; it could hold up to 550 students. Berkshire Elementary closed in 2009. Its final enrollment was 281.

In 1960 an all-girls Catholic high school, La Reine High School, opened in Suitland. It closed in 1992 and its students began attending the previously all-boys Bishop McNamara High School in Forestville.

=== Public libraries ===
Suitland is also served by the Spauldings Branch Library of the Prince George's County Memorial Library System, which was fully renovated in 2012.

== Economy ==
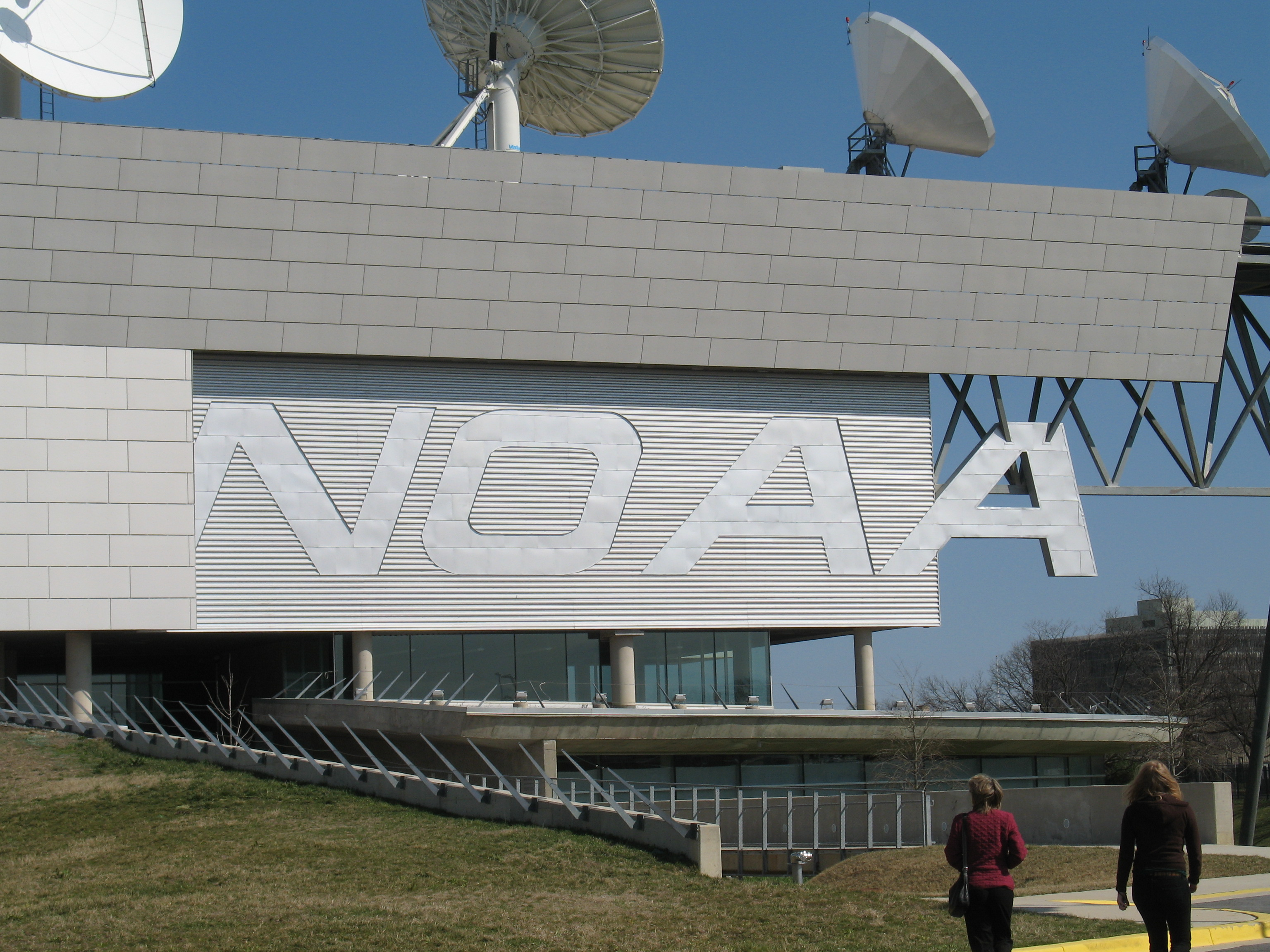
National Oceanic and Atmospheric Administration satellite control facility at Suitland

The federal government has headquartered multiple agencies in the Suitland Federal Center including:

- United States Census Bureau
- National Archives and Records Administration, Washington National Records Center
- Office of Naval Intelligence
- National Maritime Intelligence-Integration Office
- NOAA Office of Satellite Operations
- Smithsonian Institution, Museum Support Center
- Smithsonian Institution, National Museum of the American Indian Cultural Resources Center
- Smithsonian Institution, Paul E. Garber Preservation and Storage Facility
- Bureau of Economic Analysis

Other organizations headquartered in Suitland include the Air Force Sergeants Association.

== Notable people ==
- Angela Alsobrooks (b. 1971) – lawyer and U.S. senator for Maryland
- Reginald Dwayne Betts (b. 1980) – poet and memoirist
- NaVorro Bowman (b. 1988) – Penn State and NFL football player
- Cordae (b. 1997) – rapper
- Kevin Durant (b. 1988) – NBA basketball player
- George O. Gore II (b. 1982) – actor
- Steny Hoyer (b. 1939) – House Majority Leader, U.S. House of Representatives
- LaMont Jordan (b. 1978) – University of Maryland and NFL football player
- Chad Scott (b. 1974) – NFL football player
- Devin Tyler (b. 1986) – Temple University and NFL football player
- Jude Waddy (b. 1975) – NFL football player
