= Silver Hill, Maryland =

Silver Hill
- Census-designated place
- Location within the state of Maryland Silver Hill (the United States)
- Coordinates: 38°50′26″N 76°56′32″W
- Country: United States
- State: Maryland
- County: Prince George's

Area
  - Total: 1.34 sq mi (3.47 km^{2})
  - Land: 1.34 sq mi (3.47 km^{2})
  - Water: 0 sq mi (0.00 km^{2})
- Elevation: 290 ft (88 m)

Population (2020)
  - Total: 6,381
  - Density: 4,768.0/sq mi (1,840.95/km^{2})
- Time zone: UTC−5 (Eastern (EST))
  - Summer (DST): UTC−4 (EDT)
- FIPS code: 24-72350

Silver Hill is an unincorporated community and census-designated place (CDP) in Prince George's County, Maryland, United States, approximately 1 mile (1.6 km) southeast of Washington, D.C. Per the 2020 census, the population was 6,381. Prior to 2010, Silver Hill was part of the Suitland-Silver Hill census-designated place.

== Geography ==
According to the U.S. Census Bureau, Silver Hill has a total area of 1.4 square miles (3.5 km^{2}), all land.

== Demographics ==
Historical population
Census	Pop.	Note	%±
2010	5,850		—
2020	6,381		9.1%
U.S. Decennial Census; 2010 2020

Silver Hill first appeared as a census designated place in the 2010 U.S. census formed from part of the deleted Suitland-Silver Hill CDP.

=== Racial and ethnic composition ===
Silver Hill CDP, Maryland – Racial and ethnic composition Note: the US Census treats Hispanic/Latino as an ethnic category. This table excludes Latinos from the racial categories and assigns them to a separate category. Hispanics/Latinos may be of any race.
Race / Ethnicity (NH = Non-Hispanic)	Pop 2010	Pop 2020	% 2010	% 2020
White alone (NH)	167	161	2.81%	2.52%
Black or African American alone (NH)	5,390	5,700	90.59%	89.33%
Native American or Alaska Native alone (NH)	18	11	0.30%	0.17%
Asian alone (NH)	42	32	0.71%	0.50%
Native Hawaiian or Pacific Islander alone (NH)	1	1	0.02%	0.02%
Other race alone (NH)	9	19	0.15%	0.30%
Mixed race or Multiracial (NH)	105	154	1.76%	2.41%
Hispanic or Latino (any race)	218	303	3.66%	4.75%
Total	5,950	6,381	100.00%	100.00%

=== 2020 census ===
As of the 2020 census, Silver Hill had a population of 6,381. The median age was 37.6 years. 20.8% of residents were under the age of 18 and 14.9% of residents were 65 years of age or older. For every 100 females there were 77.2 males, and for every 100 females age 18 and over there were 70.0 males age 18 and over.

100.0% of residents lived in urban areas, while 0.0% lived in rural areas.

There were 2,964 households in Silver Hill, of which 25.4% had children under the age of 18 living in them. Of all households, 16.8% were married-couple households, 23.1% were households with a male householder and no spouse or partner present, and 53.3% were households with a female householder and no spouse or partner present. About 43.8% of all households were made up of individuals and 16.8% had someone living alone who was 65 years of age or older.

There were 3,171 housing units, of which 6.5% were vacant. The homeowner vacancy rate was 1.4% and the rental vacancy rate was 5.6%.

== Education ==
Silver Hill is served by the county-wide public school system, Prince George's County Public Schools.

Portions are zoned to Panorama, Suitland, Hillcrest Heights, and William Beanes elementary schools.

Portions are zoned to Benjamin Stoddert Middle School, Thurgood Marshall Middle School, and Drew-Freeman Middle School.

Portions are zoned to Potomac High School, Suitland High School, and Crossland High School.
