= Tydings =

Tydings is a surname. Notable people with the name include:

- Alexandra Tydings, American actress, director, writer, producer, and activist
- Joseph Tydings (1928–2018), American lawyer and politician
- Millard Tydings (1890–1961), American attorney, author, soldier, state legislator, senator

== See also ==
- Tydings–McDuffie Act, the Philippine Independence Act
- Millard E. Tydings Memorial Bridge, Maryland, United States
- Tydings Committee, authorized by S.Res. 231 in February 1950
- Tydings Cup, soccer cup
- Tydings Trophy, football trophy
- Senator Tydings (disambiguation)
