= 95 Express =

95 Express may refer to:

- 95 Express (Miami), a tolled express roadway and associated bus service along Interstate 95
- 95 Express Lanes (Northern Virginia), a tolled reversible express roadway along Interstate 95
- I-95 Express Toll Lanes (Baltimore), a tolled express roadway along Interstate 95
