= Interstate 95 in Maryland =

Interstate Highway in Maryland

Interstate 95
- I-95 highlighted in red

Route information
- Maintained by MDSHA and MDTA
- Length: 110.0 mi (177.0 km)
- Existed: 1963–present
- Tourist routes: Star-Spangled Banner Scenic Byway
- NHS: Entire route
- Restrictions: No hazardous goods allowed in the Fort McHenry Tunnel

Major junctions
- South end: I-95 / I-495 at the D.C. line near Oxon Hill
- I-295 near Forest Heights; US 50 near Glenarden; MD 295 in Greenbelt and Baltimore; US 1 in College Park; I-495 near College Park; MD 200 in Laurel; MD 100 in Elkridge; I-895 near Baltimore; I-195 near Baltimore; I-695 near Baltimore; I-395 in Baltimore; US 40 in Baltimore
- North end: I-95 at the Delaware state line near Elkton

Location
- Country: United States
- State: Maryland
- Counties: Prince George's, Howard, Baltimore, City of Baltimore, Harford, Cecil

Highway system
- Interstate Highway System; Main; Auxiliary; Suffixed; Business; Future; Maryland highway system; Interstate; US; State; Scenic Byways
← MD 94	→ I-97

Interstate 95 (I-95) is an interstate highway running along the East Coast of the United States from Miami, Florida, north to the Canadian border in Houlton, Maine. In Maryland, the route is a major highway that runs 110.0 miles (177.0 km) diagonally from southwest to northeast, entering from Washington, D.C. and Virginia at the Woodrow Wilson Bridge over the Potomac River, northeast to the Delaware state line near Elkton. It is the longest Interstate Highway within Maryland and is one of the most traveled Interstate Highways in the state, especially between Baltimore and Washington, D.C., despite alternate routes along the corridor, such as the Baltimore–Washington Parkway, US 1, and US 29. I-95 also has eight auxiliary routes in the state, the most of any state along the I-95 corridor. Portions of the highway, including the Fort McHenry Tunnel and the Millard E. Tydings Memorial Bridge, are tolled.

From the Woodrow Wilson Bridge to the community of College Park, it follows a portion of the Capital Beltway, completed in 1964 and numbered as I-95 in 1977. Prior to 1977, the route was intended to go on a new highway through Washington, D.C.; however, public opposition caused the cancelation of I-95 inside of the Capital Beltway. The unnamed section between the Capital Beltway to north of Baltimore was completed in various stages between 1964 and 1985, while the northeastern section from Baltimore to the Delaware state line, known as the John F. Kennedy Memorial Highway (named after the former US president, John F. Kennedy), was the first section completed, opening to traffic in 1963. A rebuild of this section was begun in 2006, and is underway; as of 2022, several miles of express toll lanes have been added to I-95 north of Baltimore, with further widening of the roadway planned through to the Delaware state line.

== Route description ==
Time-lapse video of a northbound trip on I-95 in Maryland

=== Capital Beltway ===
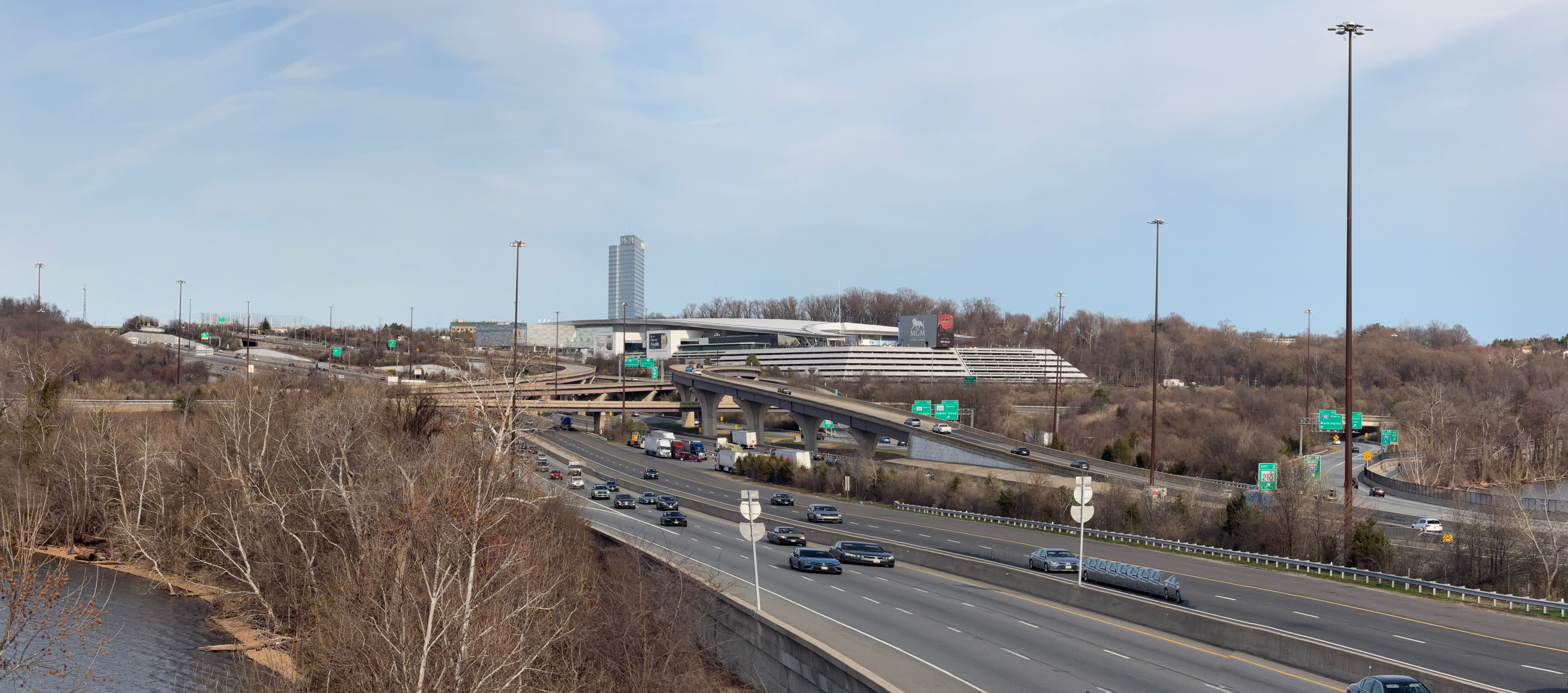
I-95/I-495's interchange with I-295 in National Harbor

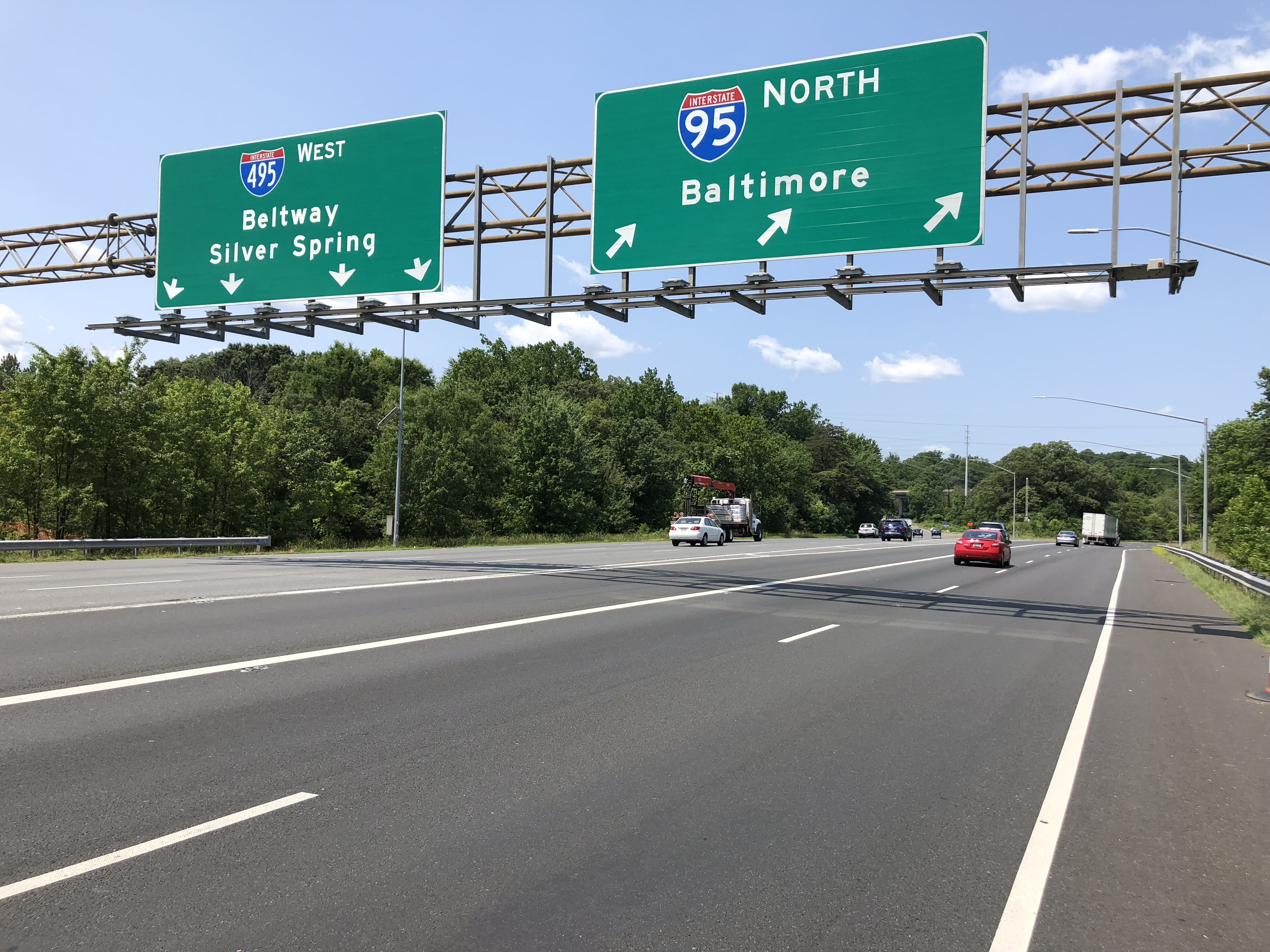
The I-95/I-495 split in College Park

I-95 enters the state of Maryland concurrently with I-495, the Capital Beltway. From Alexandria, Virginia, the roadways, five lanes in either direction, travel together over the Potomac River on the Woodrow Wilson Bridge, briefly cross the southern tip of the District of Columbia (over water), and touch down in Prince George's County west of Forest Heights. I-95/I-495 immediately encounter the southern terminus of I-295, known as the Anacostia Freeway, a route that serves Downtown Washington, D.C., and connects to the originally planned alignment of I-95 through Washington D.C., I-395. Just beyond I-295 the two routes interchange with MD 210, a major north–south route into the southern part of D.C.

The two Interstates continue along the Capital Beltway and have interchanges with various local highways such as MD 5 and MD 4 on either side of Andrews Air Force Base, which the beltway travels very close to near its northern edge. Turning north past the MD 4 interchange, the beltway runs through Glenarden, interchanging with MD 202, US 50, and MD 450, the latter route offering access to New Carrollton Station serving Washington Metro's Orange Line, MARC Train's Penn Line, and Amtrak's Northeast Corridor railroad line and the New Carrollton area.

Turning northwest, the beltway enters Greenbelt Park, interchanging with the Baltimore–Washington Parkway in the northeastern edge of the park. Just after the Baltimore–Washington Parkway, the two routes interchange with MD 201, which connects to the southern terminus of the Baltimore–Washington Parkway at US 50 near the D.C. line. Now turned fully west, the beltway runs through the northern edge of College Park, interchanging with the access roadway to the Greenbelt station serving Washington Metro's Green Line and MARC Train's Camden Line and US 1.

Beyond the US 1 interchange, I-95 encounters its own route at the College Park Interchange and separates from I-495 within this interchange. I-495 continues west, alone, on the Capital Beltway to I-270, while I-95 turns north onto its own planned alignment. The interchange includes access to a park and ride and a weigh station. It is marked as exit 27 on both interstates.

=== Beltsville to Baltimore ===
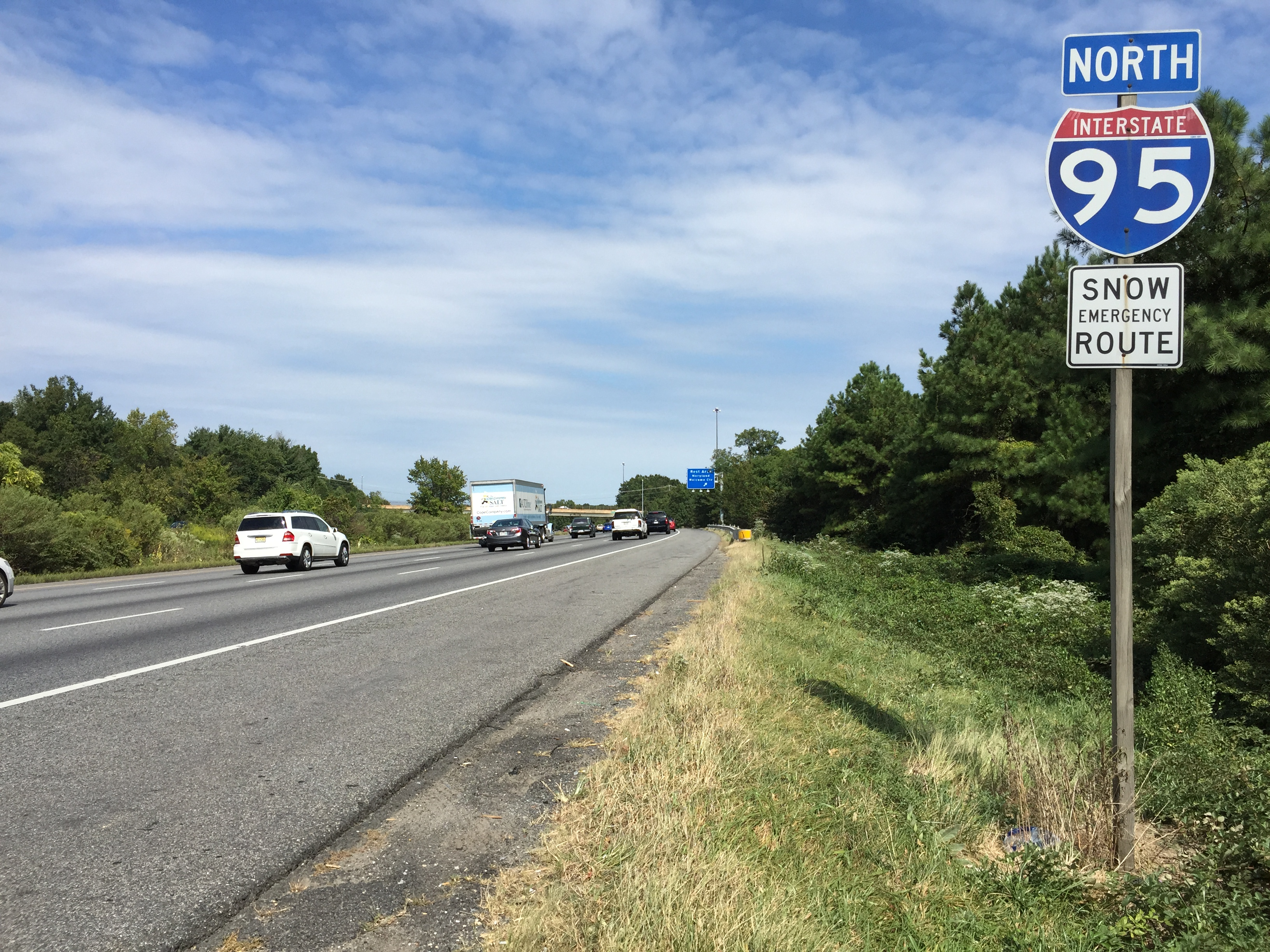
View north along I-95 past MD 216 in Howard County

Running northeast, I-95, still eight lanes wide, passes through Beltsville, interchanging with MD 212 near the community. The highway, completed in 1971, runs through undeveloped land to the interchange with MD 200 and Konterra Drive before interchanging with MD 198 just west of Laurel. Passing over the Patuxent River just south of the T. Howard Duckett Dam, the route enters Howard County and promptly has an interchange with MD 216. North of the MD 216 interchange, the route encounters its first rest area in the state of Maryland, with separate facilities for the northbound and southbound lanes. Continuing northeast, I-95 interchanges with MD 32 at a modified directional cloverleaf interchange. Within this interchange, I-95 grade-separates, with the northbound carriageway passing over MD 32 and the southbound carriageway passing under MD 32, allowing left exits from both of the latter's carriageways to merge into the left lanes of I-95 without conflict.

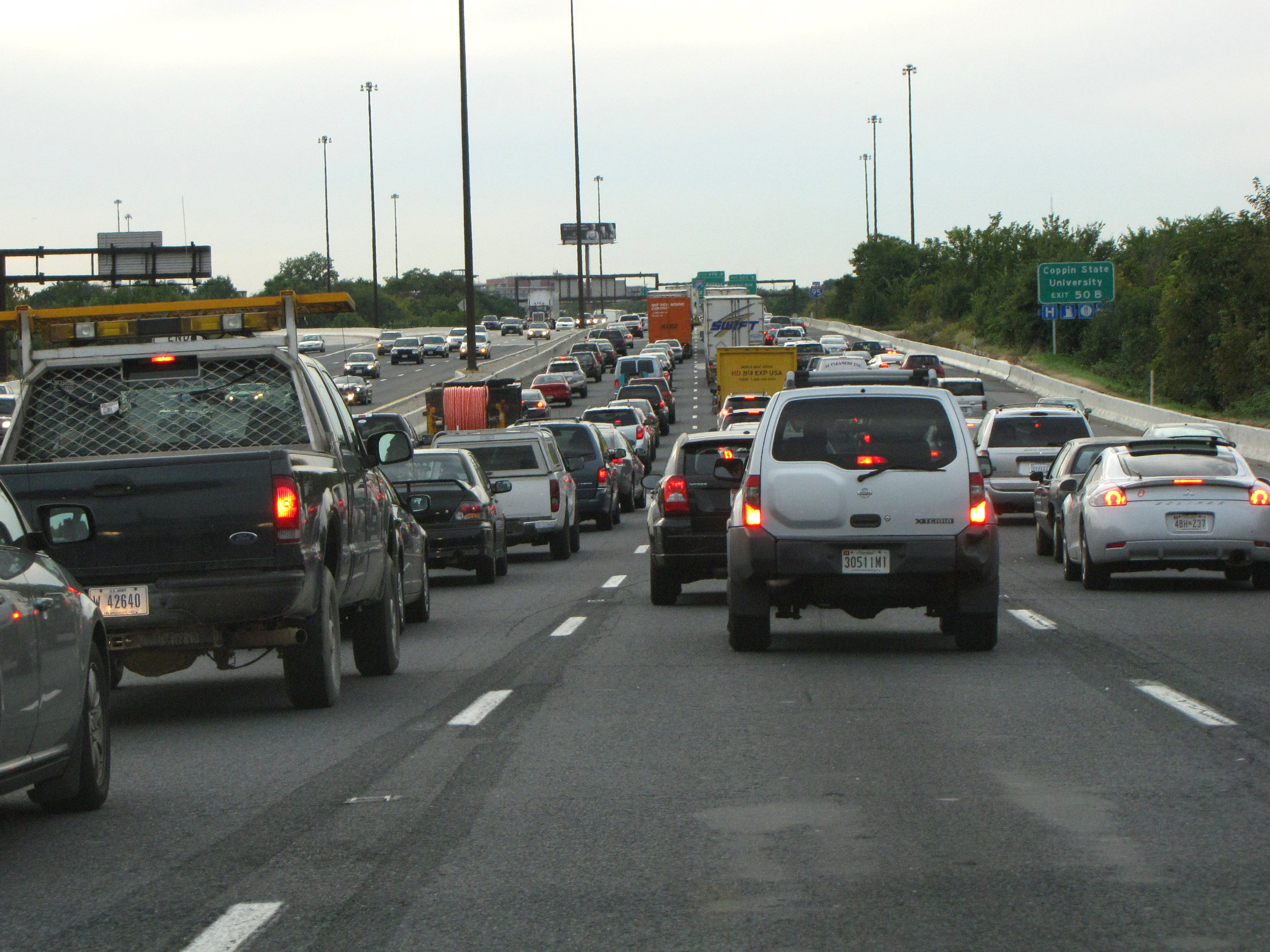
Traffic congestion on I-95 southbound in Baltimore

North of this unusual interchange, I-95 encounters MD 175, the main access route into Columbia, at a less-radical directional cloverleaf interchange. After the MD 175 interchange comes the MD 100 interchange, providing access to Ellicott City, US 29, and I-70 to the west and the Baltimore–Washington Parkway and I-97 to the east. Just beyond this interchange, I-95 encounters three more of its auxiliary routes within Maryland: I-895, which splits from I-95 within Patapsco Valley State Park, just south of the Patapsco River (and at which point the road enters the southwestern part of Baltimore County); I-195 and MD 166 near Catonsville, a short spur to Baltimore/Washington International Airport; and I-695 near Halethorpe, the Baltimore Beltway, a full-circle beltway around Baltimore that offers a full freeway bypass of the city and that connects to I-70, I-83, and I-97. Before its collapse in March 2024, northbound traffic not authorized to make use of either of the direct (tunnel) routes through Baltimore (such as vehicles either carrying hazardous materials or exceeding the tunnel clearance heights) was encouraged to use the eastern half of I-695, which crossed the Patapsco River via the Francis Scott Key Bridge; it is now detoured onto the western half of the beltway, with I-95 being available to all other through traffic.

When this part of I-95 opened to traffic in 1971, all interchanges in the stretch had high-mast lighting (with mercury vapor lights), but, beginning in 2010, these were replaced with lower-mounted conventional streetlights. However, the MD 200 and southern I-895 interchanges (which opened in 1973 as part of an extension from its original terminus at US 1) now have high-mast lights (with high-pressure sodium lights, same as those within Baltimore), and new LED high-masts replaced the original ones at the I-195/MD 166 interchange.

=== Within Baltimore ===
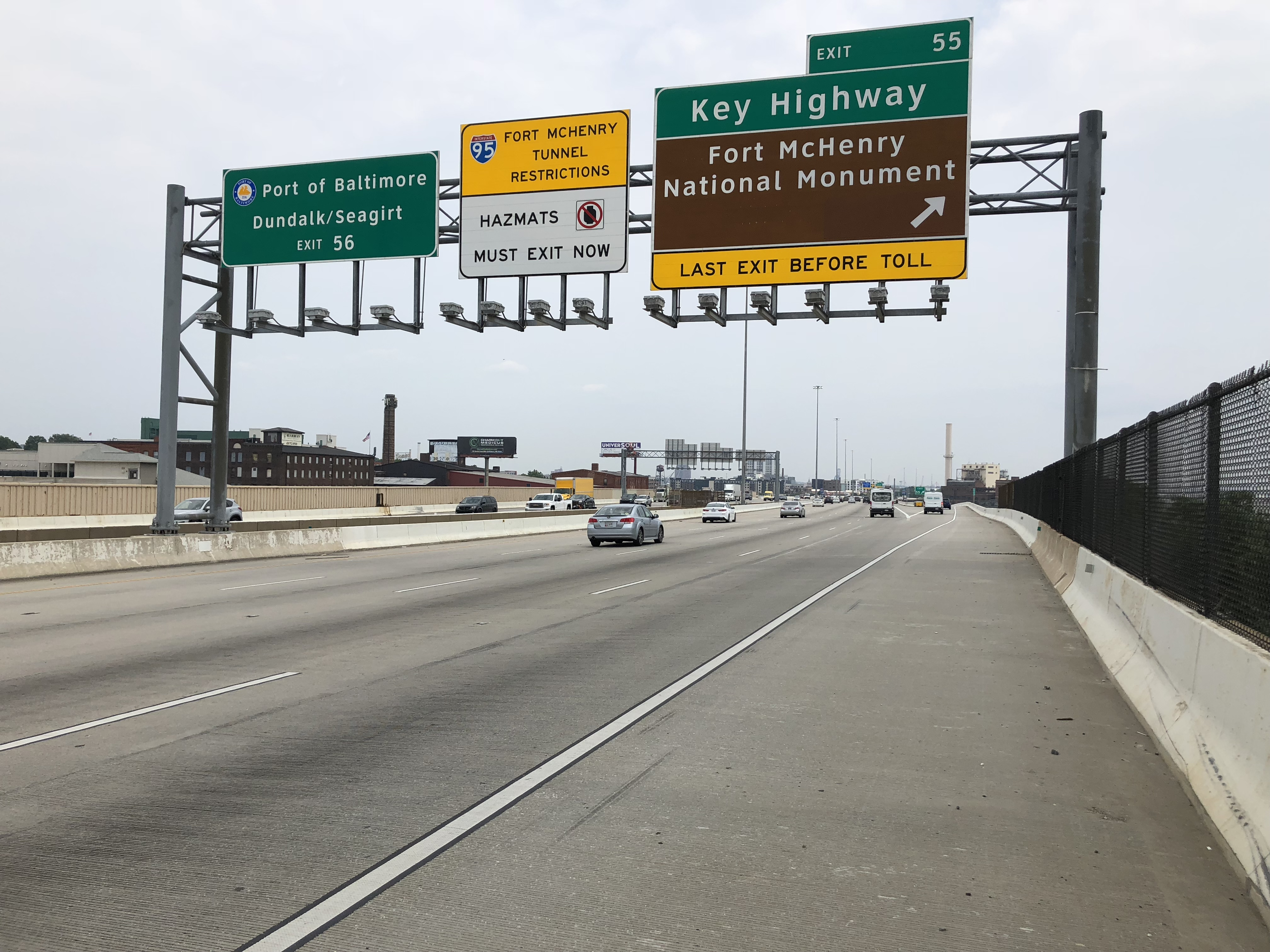
I-95 northbound at Key Highway in Baltimore

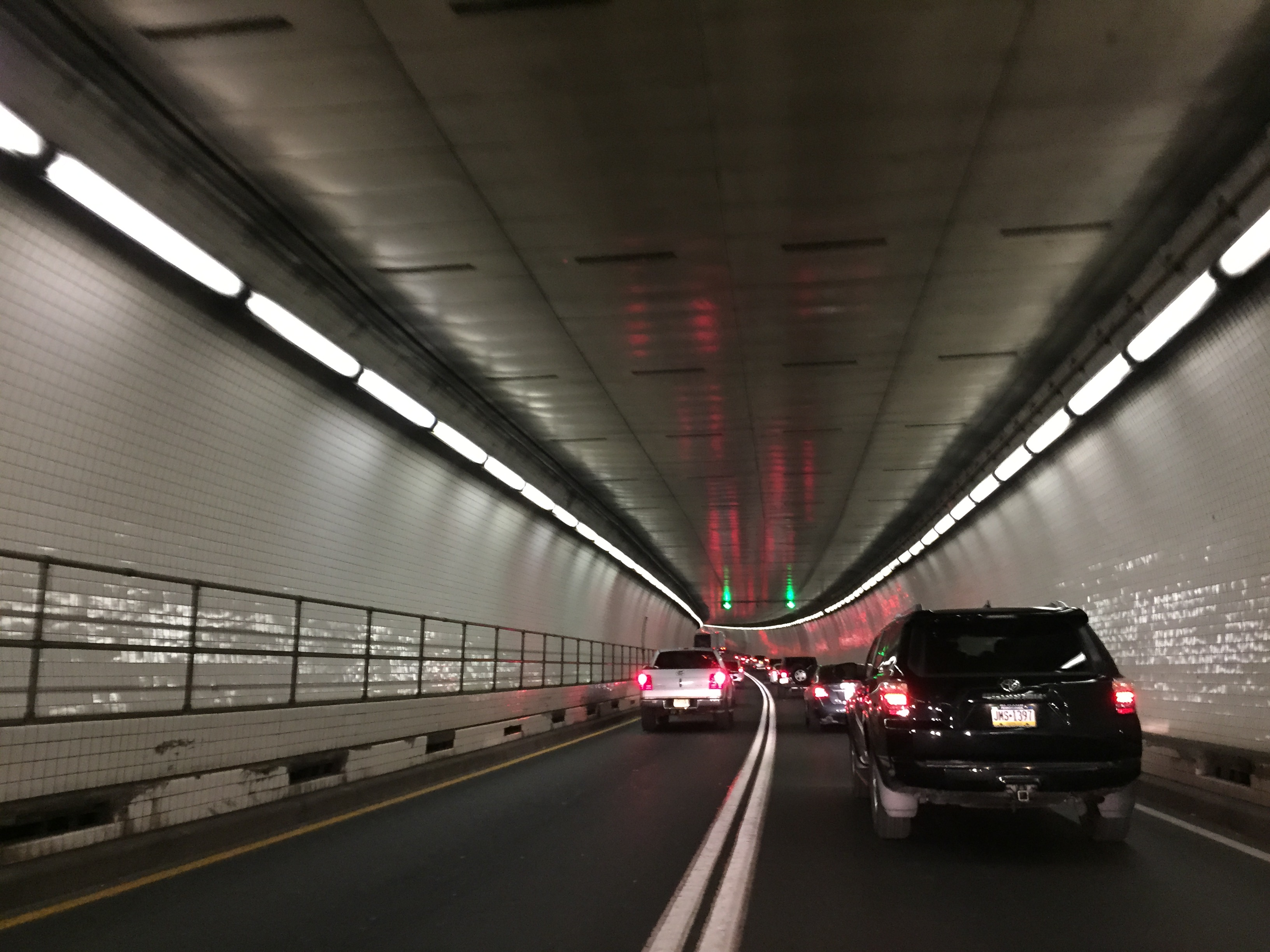
I-95 northbound through the Fort McHenry Tunnel in Baltimore

South of Baltimore, I-95 is maintained by the Maryland State Highway Administration; north of the southern Baltimore city line, I-95 changes jurisdiction to the Maryland Transportation Authority. Continuing on its northeasterly track, the route interchanges with Caton Avenue (US 1 Alt.) just beyond the city line. I-95's interchange with Caton Avenue (US 1 Alt.) incorporates stubs and unused embankments that would have been used for the planned eastern terminus of I-70 within Baltimore (later planned as the southern terminus of I-595, though the freeway was later canceled and that designation was moved to US 50 east of Washington). Continuing past this unbuilt interchange, I-95 intersects Washington Boulevard, a local city street (with ramps to the southbound side and from the northbound side), before encountering the main access route into the central business district, I-395. I-95 also interchanges with MD 295 at the northern terminus of the Baltimore–Washington Parkway (and the southern terminus of Russell Street, with ramps to the transitioning roads and from the terminating ones) within the I-395 interchange, which is almost completely elevated over the middle branch of the Patapsco River. After interchanging with both routes, I-95 interchanges with MD 2 and Key Highway, the latter route offering access to Fort McHenry and an escape route for hazardous material traffic.

I-95 encounters the Fort McHenry Tunnel south of Fort McHenry. The tunnel, containing eight lanes, curves underneath the Northwest Harbor and emerges in the Canton neighborhood of Baltimore, quickly encountering the all-electronic toll plaza and connector ramps that lead to and from Keith Avenue. After the toll plaza, I-95 encounters the Boston Street/O'Donnell Street interchange, which also incorporates stubs and other unused infrastructure planned to be used for the southern terminus of I-83; I-95 also passes over I-895 within the interchange area, with no access between the two routes, then runs into east Baltimore, providing local access to various city streets (a northbound-only exit to Dundalk Avenue and a three-quarter interchange with Eastern Avenue, which share southbound access ramps via Kane Street) in lieu of I-895. It interchanges with the Moravia Road freeway spur next to the Baltimore city line, where ramp stubs were once planned for an unbuilt portion of the Windlass Freeway, then connects with US 40 before narrowing to six lanes and merging with I-895 just after exiting Baltimore into northeastern part of Baltimore County.

From 2009 to 2015, new gray gantries were installed that displayed signs in the Clearview font which was being adopted statewide, replacing the old brown gantries and Highway Gothic signs, some of which had button copy. In 2017, the high-mast poles, which were also brown, were taken down and replaced with new gray ones.

=== John F. Kennedy Memorial Highway ===
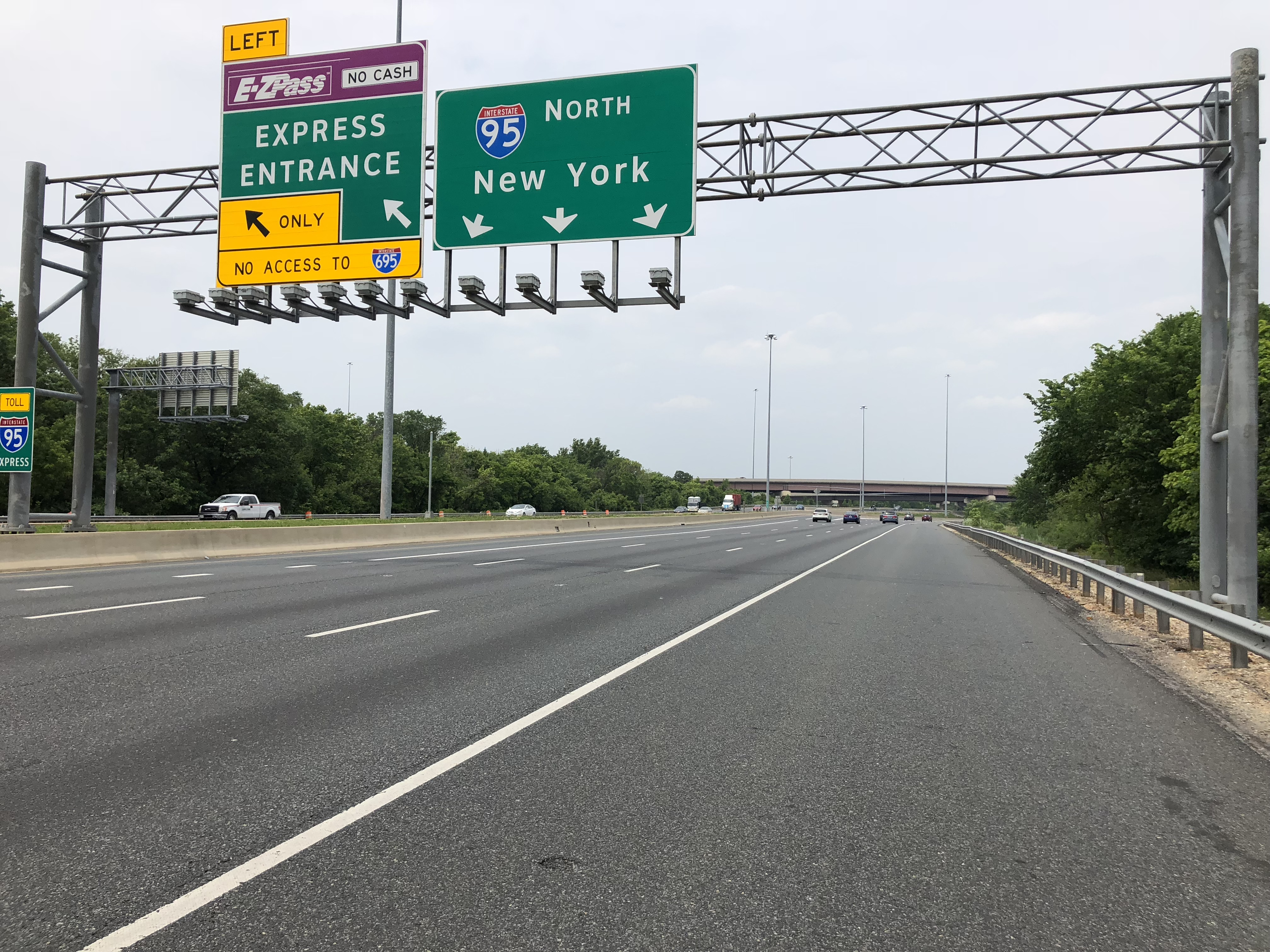
I-95 northbound at entrance to express toll lanes in Baltimore

The John F. Kennedy Memorial Highway portion of I-95, a toll facility operated by the MDTA, begins at the end of the Baltimore Harbor Tunnel Thruway (I-895), which is also operated by the Maryland Transportation Authority, at the Baltimore city line. Starting out eight lanes wide at the junction with I-895, after three miles (4.8 km), I-95 once again interchanges with I-695 in Rosedale at what was a unique double-crossover interchange. Within this interchange, the carriageways of I-95 narrowed to six lanes and crossed over each other, thereby putting through traffic on the left within the interchange nexus, allowing left exit ramps and left entrance ramps to accommodate four of the eight movements in lieu of flyovers. Beyond the interchange, both sets of carriageways crossed over each other again and resumed right-hand running. As part of the upgrades to I-95 to accommodate express toll lanes in this area, this interchange was replaced with a more conventional four-level stack; all exits are now on the right, and I-95's carriageways no longer cross over one another; a similar project also eliminated the crossovers on I-695. At this junction, southbound vehicles that cannot use either tunnel are redirected onto the western half of I-695, as its eastern half has been severed by the collapse of the Francis Scott Key Bridge.

Continuing to the northeast, parallel with the Chesapeake Bay, the route encounters MD 43 near White Marsh. After passing through Gunpowder Falls State Park, and into Harford County, the route has interchanges with MD 152 north of Joppatowne, then with MD 24, providing access to Bel Air and Edgewood. Within the MD 24 interchange, I-95 narrows to six lanes and remains this wide to the Delaware state line.

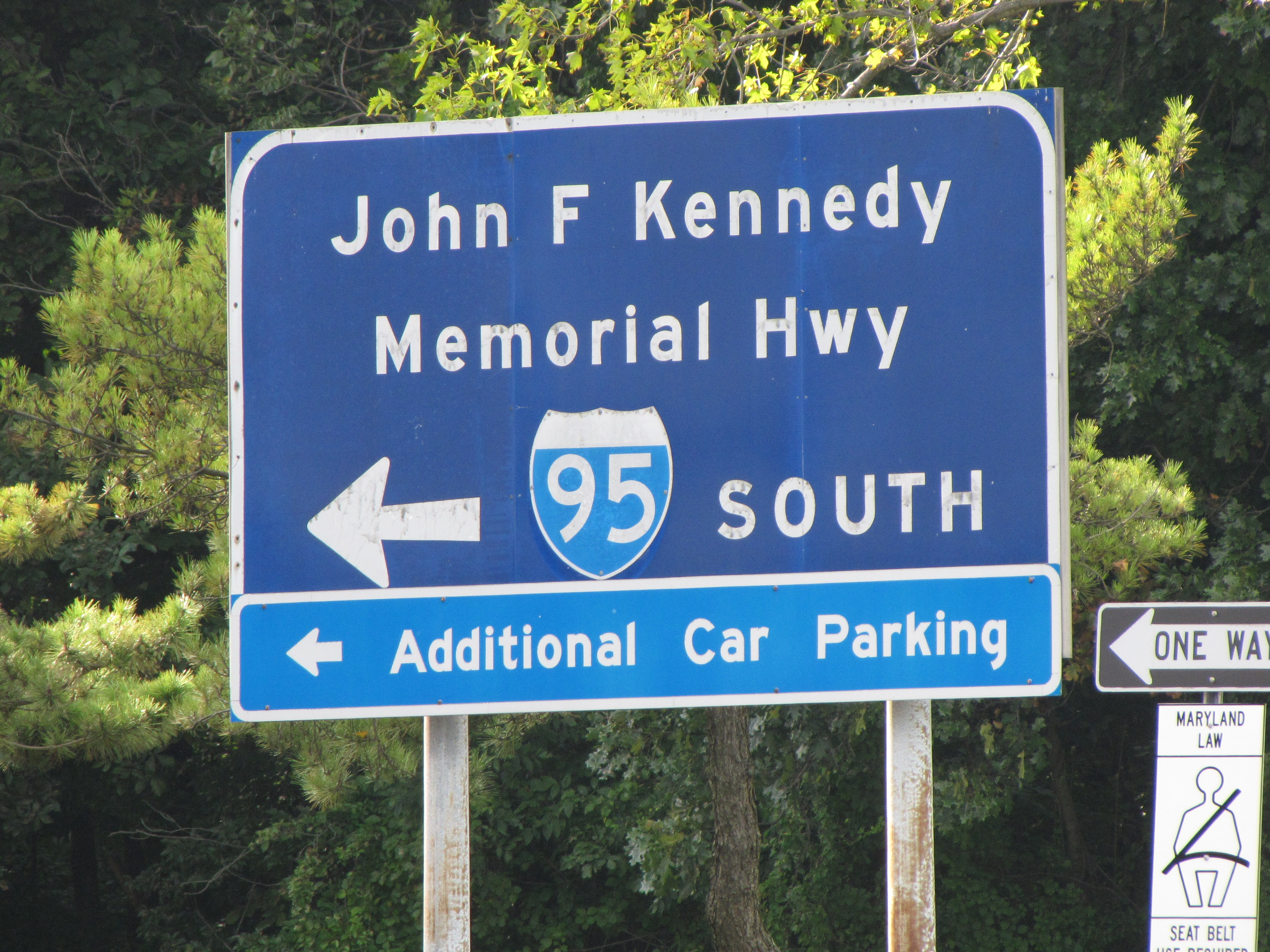
Sign at Maryland House identifying the road as the John F. Kennedy Memorial Highway

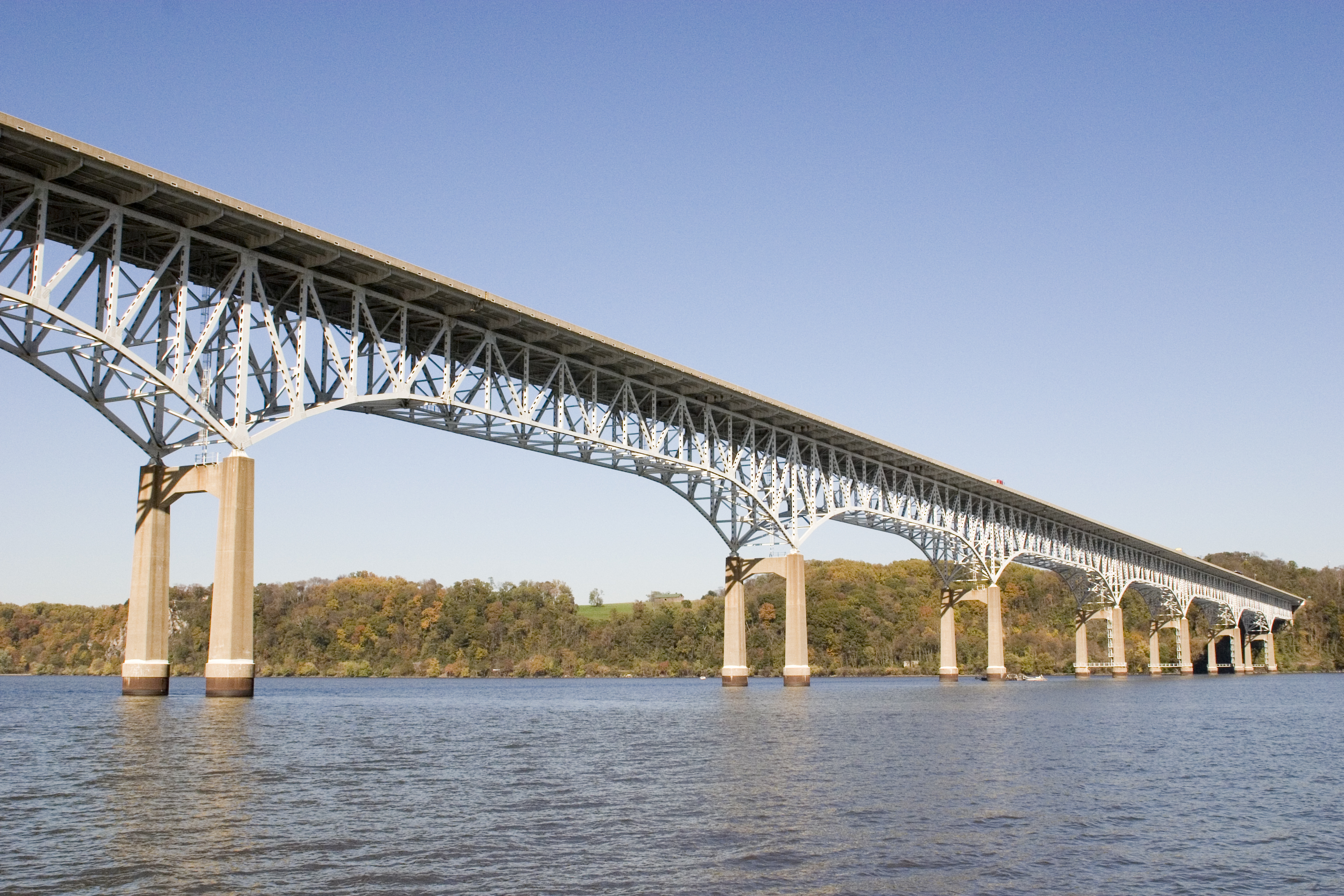
I-95 crossing the Susquehanna River via the Millard E. Tydings Memorial Bridge

Just beyond the MD 543 interchange, I-95's carriageways split apart to provide space for the Maryland House service area accessible from both directions. Beyond Maryland House, the route encounters the MD 22 interchange in Aberdeen, providing access to Aberdeen Proving Ground. South of Susquehanna State Park, I-95 encounters the southern end of the remaining tolled portion of the highway at the MD 155 interchange, providing access to Havre de Grace and US 40. (Until the 1980s, there were tolls to enter I-95 southbound and exit it northbound in Harford County.)

North of this interchange, I-95 becomes a true toll route as it passes through Susquehanna State Park before crossing the Susquehanna River on the Millard E. Tydings Memorial Bridge. The bridge crosses between bluffs high above the river valley, and is posted with warning signs: "Subject to Crosswinds". The highway now enters Cecil County. Just beyond the bridge is an all-electronic toll gantry at Perryville, where tolls are collected in the northbound direction only. There are no southbound tolls on the highway, but southbound truck traffic may need to stop at a nearby weigh station. At the northern end of the plaza is exit 93 for MD 222 in Perryville, before continuing through Cecil County toward the Delaware state line. (Until the 1980s, there were tolls at the southbound exits and northbound entrances, at the Perryville and North East interchanges.)

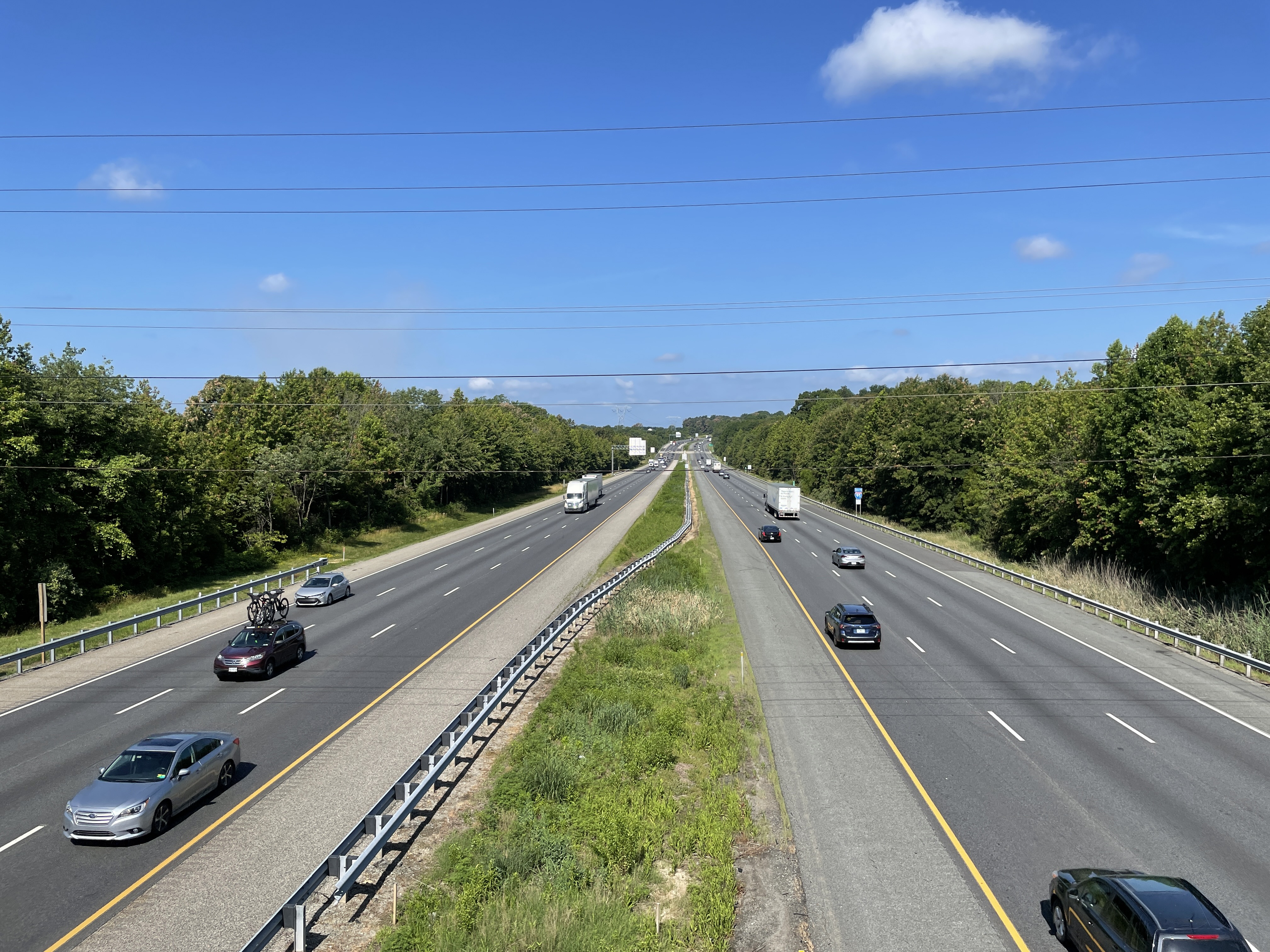
I-95 southbound past the MD 279 interchange near Elkton

Still paralleling the northern shore of the Chesapeake Bay, I-95's carriageways split apart again to encounter another service area, Chesapeake House, that is accessible from both directions. Now past the northern tip of the bay, north of Elk Neck State Park, the route encounters MD 272, which provides access to the towns of North East and Rising Sun. The "North East Rising Sun" exit off I-95 has been read by some drivers, including children's writer Katherine Paterson, as referring to a single exotically named location. Having turned east, the route now runs straight toward the Delaware state line, passing under MD 213 north of Elkton with no access offered and then reaching the exit 109 interchange with MD 279, which provides a direct route into Elkton and Newark, Delaware. I-95's run through Maryland comes to an end quickly after that exit, and it crosses the Delaware state line, becomes the Delaware Turnpike, and soon reaches the Newark mainline toll plaza (in 2012, the Maryland Transportation Authority installed signs prior to and at the MD 279 interchange informing motorists of the Delaware toll plaza ahead).

Similar to what was done on the between the beltways segment, new lighting projects have replaced the original high-mast lights (which were also mercury vapor) with conventional streetlights at the MD 152 and MD 155 interchanges, but new high-masts were installed from the Perryville toll plaza to MD 222. Additionally, there are now high-mast lights at the northern I-695 interchange in Rosedale to match its southern counterpart in Halethorpe (although the ones in Halethorpe were removed by 2018); those replaced the conventional streetlights that had existed within the area.

==== Express lanes ====
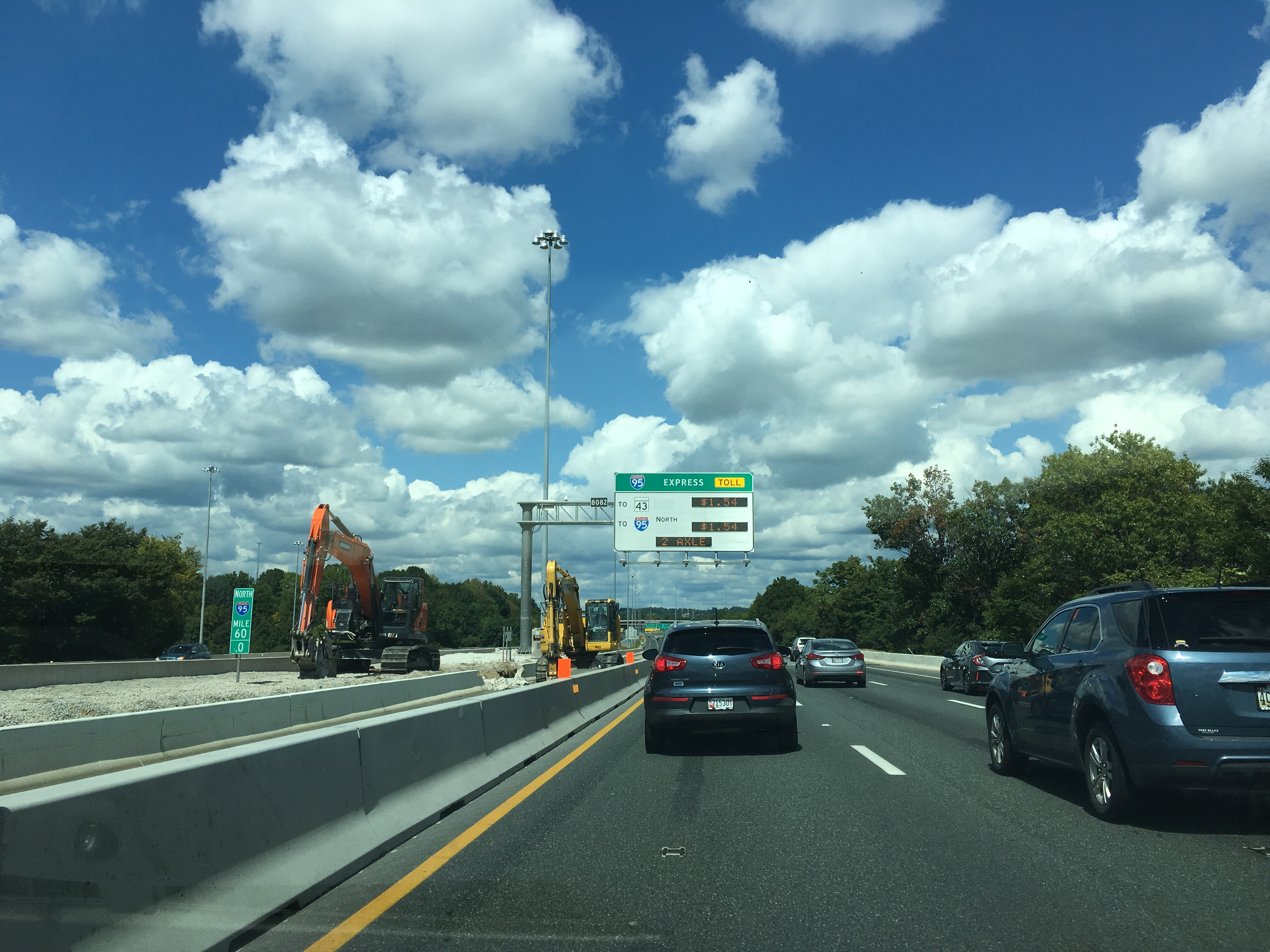
Sign listing rates for the express toll lanes along I-95 northbound in Baltimore

I-95 has express toll lanes in the median between the I-895 merge into the northern part of Baltimore to just north of MD 152 in Joppa, with two express toll lanes in each direction. In addition to access to and from I-95 at both ends, the express toll lanes have a southbound exit and northbound entrance with I-895, a southbound exit and northbound entrance with Moravia Road via I-895, and a northbound exit, southbound & northbound entrances with MD 43. The express toll lanes utilize all-electronic tolling; tolls are collected by E-ZPass or video tolling, which uses automatic license plate recognition and sends a bill in the mail to the vehicle owner. Video tolling users pay an additional 50-percent surcharge on their tolls. The toll rates along the express toll lanes vary by time of day and the day of the week. Peak travel times, which is southbound during weekday mornings, northbound during weekday evenings, and both directions on weekend afternoons, have the highest rates. Off-peak travel times, which occur during the daytime outside of peak travel times, have lower rates, with the overnight hours having the lowest rates.

== Services ==
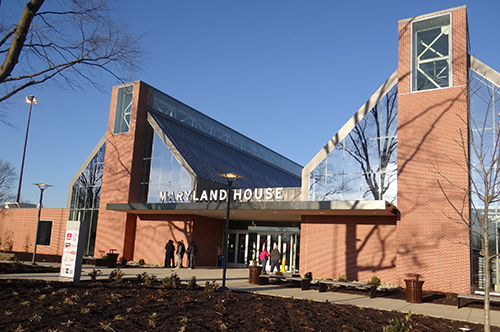
Maryland House service area along I-95 in Harford County

Just as in Delaware, the northern segment of I-95 in Maryland has service areas in the median that serve both directions of traffic. This dates back to its days as a two-state toll highway. Between the Delaware line and the Baltimore city line, two service areas are available, owned by the Maryland Transportation Authority and run by Areas USA. Both service areas offer bus parking, free Wi-Fi, restrooms, a Kids Korner seating area, an outdoor seating area, multiple fast-food restaurants, retail stores, and Sunoco as the fuel offering.

=== Maryland House ===
Maryland House, opened in 1963, is at milepost 81.9 in Harford County. It was later remodeled in 1987, and wing additions were added in 1989–1990. It was closed on September 15, 2012, and demolished for reconstruction, reopening on January 16, 2014. This service area includes a dog park.

=== Chesapeake House ===
Chesapeake House, which opened in 1975 (after the highway was widened from four to six lanes in 1972), is at milepost 97 in Cecil County. It was closed and demolished in January 2014 following the reopening of the Maryland House and reopened on August 5, 2014.

=== Maryland Welcome Center & Rest Area ===
A pair of rest areas is located in Howard County, between Baltimore and Washington, D.C. Unlike the two service areas farther north, which are in the median, these rest areas are located on the shoulders, with separate facilities for each direction of travel. They feature only restrooms, a tourist information area, and vending machines, in contrast with the full food and fuel options at the two service areas farther north.

== History ==
An older version of the I-95 shield as used in Maryland

=== Northeast Freeway ===
Under the original plans for I-95 in Maryland, the route would not have followed the eastern half of the Capital Beltway from the Woodrow Wilson Bridge to the College Park Interchange. Instead, it would have exited D.C. at New Hampshire Avenue (MD 650), following the Northeast Freeway, and, after passing through Northwest Branch Park, junctioned I-495 at the College Park Interchange, integrating seamlessly with the existing segment of I-95 at that interchange. This route was canceled in 1977, and I-95 rerouted, after the D.C. government canceled the North Central Freeway, which would have linked to the Northeast Freeway at its southern end and carried I-95 deeper into D.C., connecting to the Inner Loop. The part of I-95 that was completed from Downtown Washington, D.C., to the Springfield Interchange in Springfield, Virginia, was then redesignated as I-395.

=== I-95 in Baltimore ===
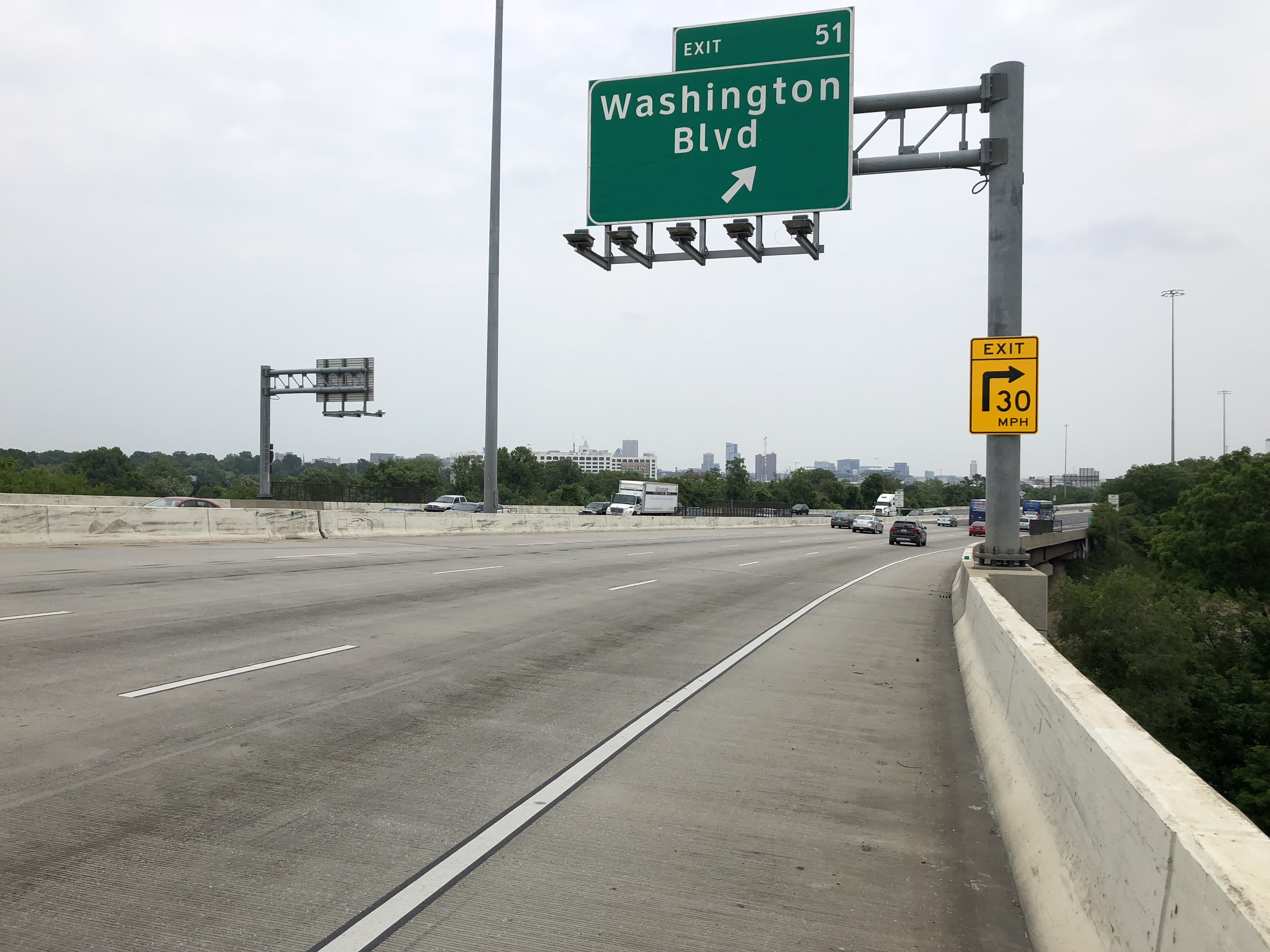
I-95 northbound approaching downtown Baltimore at Washington Boulevard exit

==== Planning ====
Several proposals were made during the 1940s and 1950s for an East–West Expressway through Baltimore. After nine different proposals were floated, the city's department of planning published a proposal of its own in 1960. The route in the proposal would have started out as I-70N (as it was known then) and run due east through vast city parkland before picking up the small piece of freeway that was constructed within the Franklin Street–Mulberry Street corridor, and then crossing the city to the north of the Inner Harbor on an elevated viaduct within the central business district. The route would have met two other freeways—the Jones Falls Expressway and the Southwest Expressway—at a four-way interchange in the southeast edge of the central business district; I-95 would have followed the Southwest Expressway, and met both I-70N and I-83 (on the Jones Falls Expressway) at this interchange. I-70N and I-83 would have terminated at the interchange, while I-95 would have turned east and followed the East–West Expressway out of the central business district, along the Boston Street corridor and out towards East Baltimore, intersecting with the Harbor Tunnel Thruway near today's exit 62. The Southwest Expressway would have cut through Federal Hill and crossed the Inner Harbor on a fixed bridge with 50 feet (15 m) of vertical navigational clearance. All these proposed routes would have required extensive right-of-way acquisition and clearance.

The above routings were eventually further refined and modified and eventually became part of the Baltimore 10-D Interstate System, approved in 1962. In this plan, I-95 would run east–west to the north of Fort McHenry, similarly to the above proposal, but would have run along the southern edge of the CBD, passing to the north of Federal Hill and cutting through the historic Fell's Point neighborhood. After crossing the Inner Harbor on another low bridge, it would have followed the Boston Street corridor, crossing the Harbor Tunnel Thruway near to where it does today, then followed the existing I-95 alignment out of the city. The highway would have junctioned I-70N a mile (1.6 km) to the northwest of the Inner Harbor, near the eastern terminus of the now-defunct I-170; it would have met I-83 in the northeastern corner of the CBD. This routing was little different from the routings proposed in 1960 and was also universally disliked.

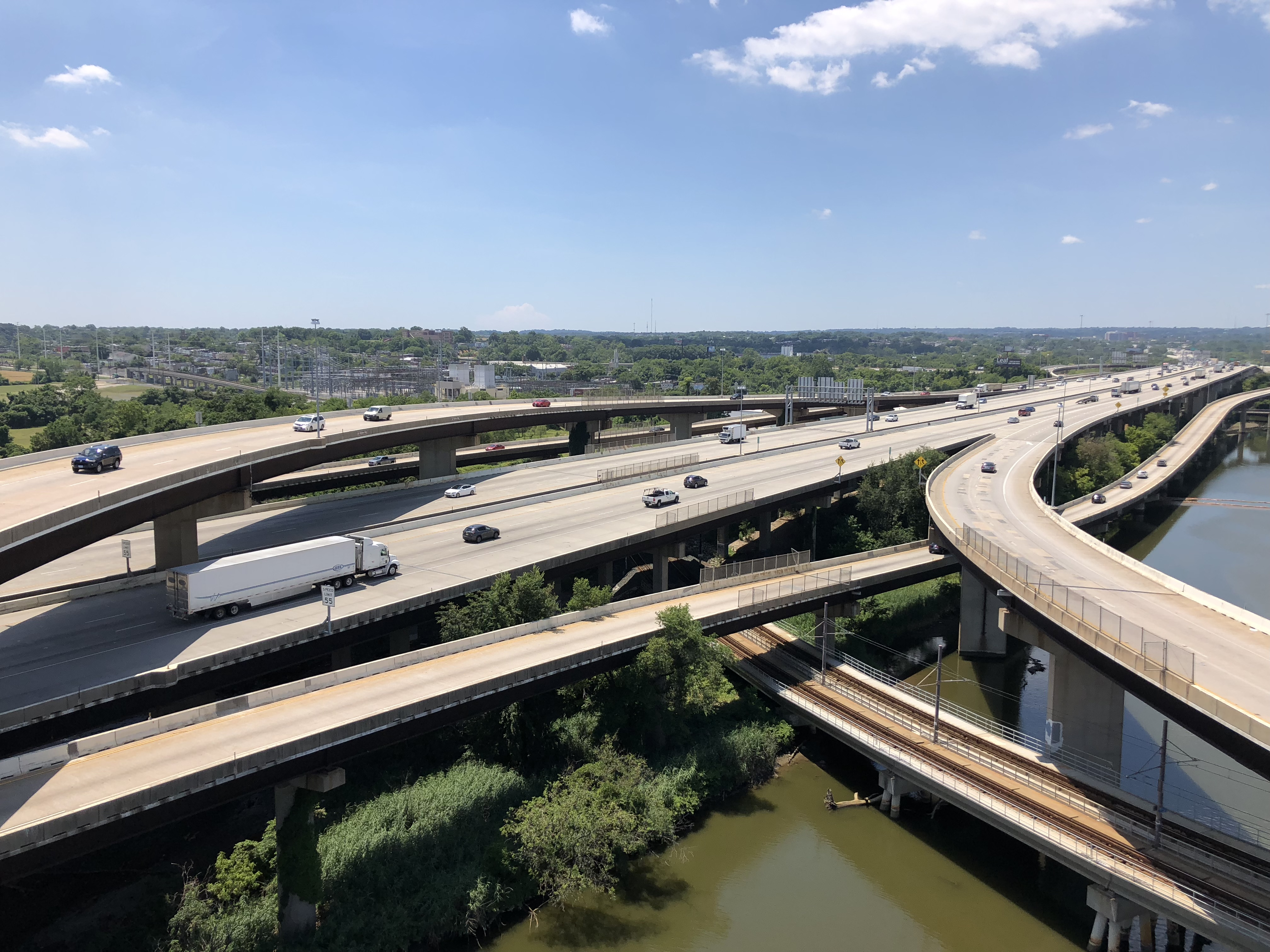
I-95 at I-395 in Baltimore

By 1969, the design concept team, a multidiscipline group assembled in 1966 by the city government to help design freeway routings that would not disrupt the city's fabric, the 10-D System had been replaced by the Baltimore 3-A Interstate and Boulevard System. In the 3-A system, I-95 was shifted south onto the Locust Point peninsula and eventually constructed there. Originally, I-95 was planned to cross the Patapsco River on a 180-foot-high (55 m) bridge, but opposition to this crossing brought forth the Fort McHenry Tunnel, which made up the last part of I-95 to be completed within the city limits. I-70N would have run through Gwynns Falls/Leakin Park to terminate at I-95 near US 1 Alt. (with the I-170 spur serving the areas to the immediate west of the central business district, where it would terminate), while I-83 was shifted to a new alignment and planned to terminate at I-95 north of the Patapsco River. I-395 was also brought into existence under this plan; it was planned as a freeway spur from I-95 to the south edge of the central business district, connecting to a new route named City Boulevard (now known as Martin Luther King Jr. Boulevard). The 3-A System's result was that I-95 would act as a bypass of the central business district, with I-395 providing direct access.

==== Construction ====
The first portion of I-95 in Baltimore was the southern 0.6 miles (0.97 km) of the John F. Kennedy Memorial Highway, completed in 1963. By 1971, I-95 had entered Baltimore proper when it was completed between the Capital and Baltimore beltways; beyond the southern I-695 interchange, the highway came to a dead halt at US 1 Alt. By 1974, I-95 was under construction in East Baltimore between its current merge with I-895 south to a partial cloverleaf interchange with MD 150. By 1976, I-95 was under construction east of US 1 Alt. and south of MD 150. By 1981, I-95 was completed as far as I-395, and by 1984, with the construction of the Fort McHenry Tunnel quite advanced, the route was open as far as MD 2 west of the Patapsco River and Boston Street/O'Donnell Street east of the Patapsco River. With the final opening of the tunnel on November 23, 1985, I-95 was finally completed within the city of Baltimore.

==== Tolling ====
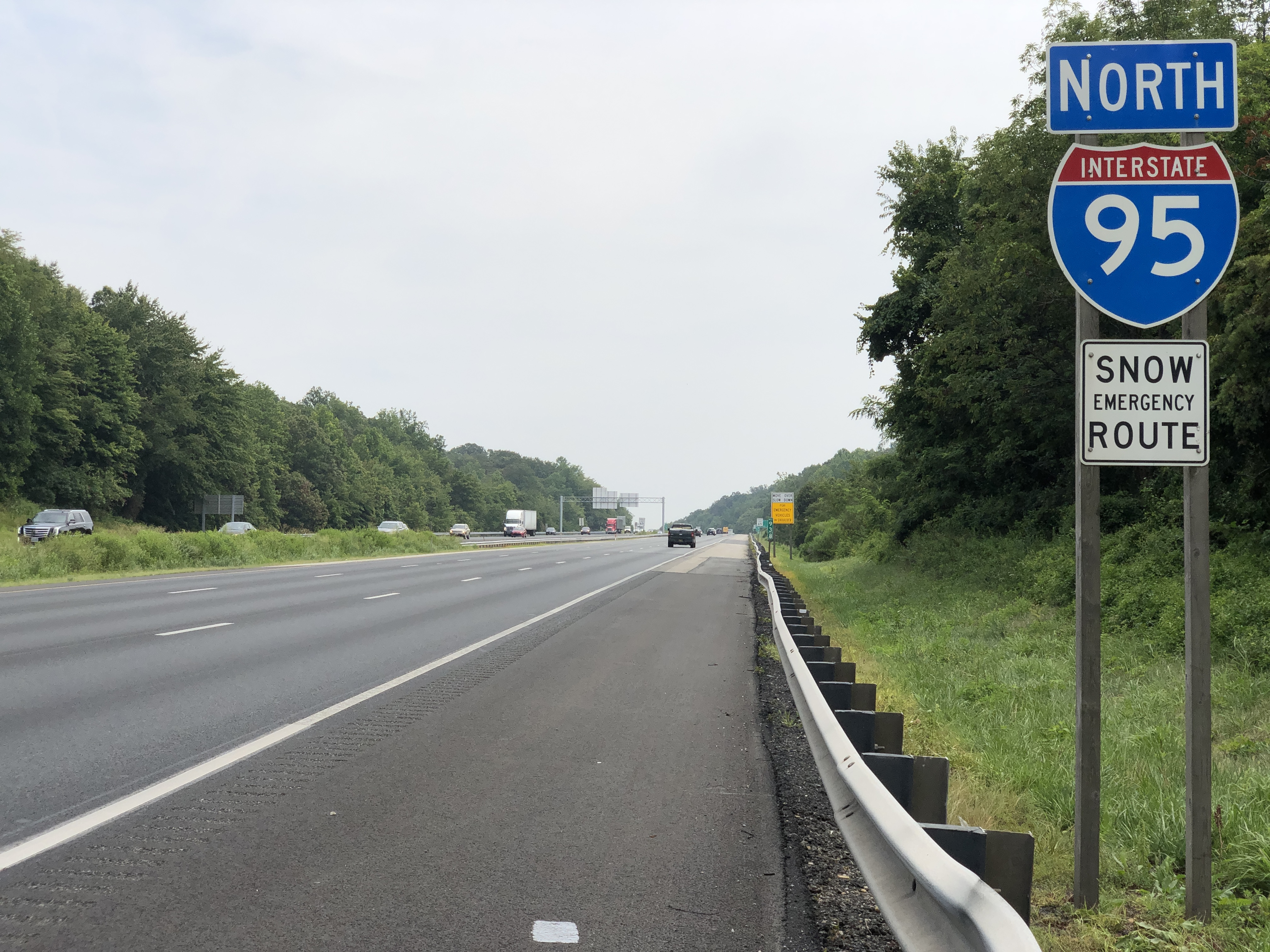
I-95 northbound past the MD 222 interchange in Perryville

Originally, the toll plaza at the north end of the Fort McHenry Tunnel was to be removed after the city of Baltimore repaid its share of the construction costs of the tunnel. However, the Maryland Transportation Authority lobbied successfully to keep the toll plaza in place to prevent a traffic problem on I-95 within Baltimore.

=== John F. Kennedy Memorial Highway ===
Despite the route's inclusion in the Interstate Highway System in the mid-1950s, the construction of the Baltimore and Capital beltways had diverted most of the state funds that would have been used to build it. To relieve traffic on US 40, it was decided to finance construction using a bond issue. The Maryland State Roads Commission, the predecessor to the Maryland Transportation Authority, floated $73 million (equivalent to $578 million in 2024) in revenue bonds to provide funds to start construction of the route, which began in January 1962.

Completed in 1963, the 48-mile (77 km) Northeast Expressway and the adjoining 11-mile (18 km) Delaware Turnpike were dedicated by President John F. Kennedy, Delaware Governor Elbert N. Carvel, and Maryland Governor J. Millard Tawes in a ceremony at the state line on November 14, 1963. Eight days after dedicating the toll road, President Kennedy was assassinated in Dallas. As a result, both the Northeast Expressway and Delaware Turnpike were renamed the John F. Kennedy Memorial Highway in his honor in December 1963.

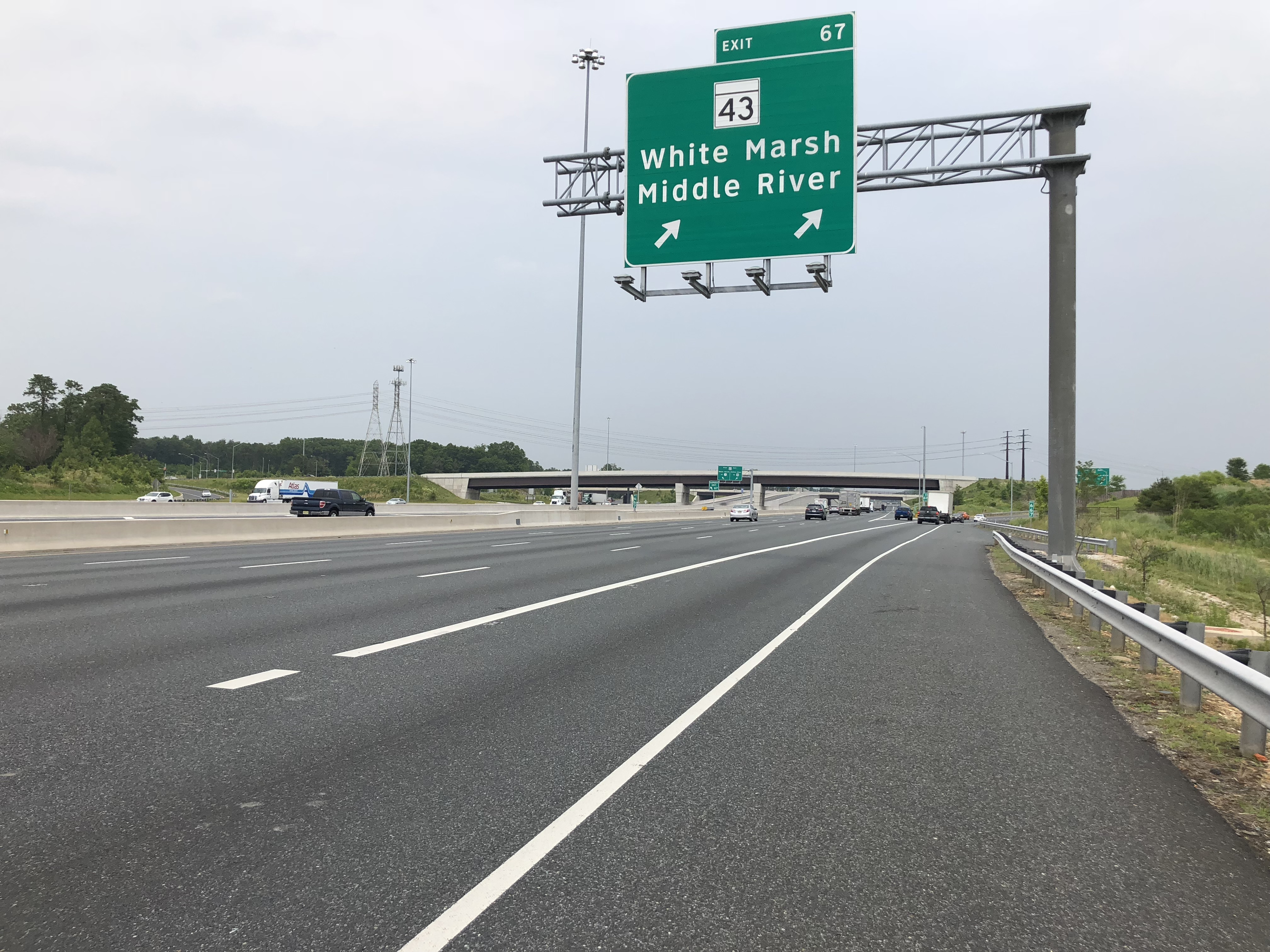
I-95 northbound at the MD 43 exit in White Marsh

Between 1963 and 1993, the John F. Kennedy Memorial Highway was a tolled facility for the entire length of the roadway in both directions. The mainline toll plaza is situated just north of the Millard E. Tydings Memorial Bridge in Perryville. The southbound toll plaza was removed in 1991, but tolls are still collected for northbound traffic over the Millard E. Tydings Memorial Bridge at this location. Additionally, ramp tolls were collected at many of the interchanges until they were abolished by an act of the legislature in 1981. The highway and bridge are maintained by the Maryland Transportation Authority.

Exits on the John F. Kennedy Memorial Highway were originally numbered consecutively, beginning with exit 1. As a result, I-95 in Maryland had multiple conflicting sequences of exit numbers. In the mid-1980s, the exits were renumbered according to a statewide, mileage-based numbering system, so that they now range from exit 2 (I-295 north) on the Capital Beltway to exit 109 (MD 279) on the John F. Kennedy Memorial Highway.

To allow a seamless connection between the John F. Kennedy Memorial Highway and the then-unnumbered Harbor Tunnel Thruway, a partial interchange was constructed for I-95 to continue south into Baltimore. However, this meant that I-95 had to enter from and exit to the right, as evidenced by a southbound flyover ramp; a construction project corrected the problem in 2009 so that I-95 would proceed straight through the interchange.

Express toll lanes were built from the I-895 merge in northern Baltimore to just north of MD 43. The lanes opened on Saturday, December 6, 2014, after more than eight years of construction. Construction of the I-95 express toll lanes was part of the $1.1-billion (equivalent to $1.43 billion in 2024) I-95 Improvement Project, which included $756 million (equivalent to $984 million in 2024) in highway and safety improvements along eight miles (13 km) of I-95 from the I-895 interchange to just north of White Marsh Boulevard (MD 43) northeast of Baltimore. On December 18, 2024, the northbound express toll lanes were extended from MD 43 north to MD 152.

=== Changes in jurisdiction ===
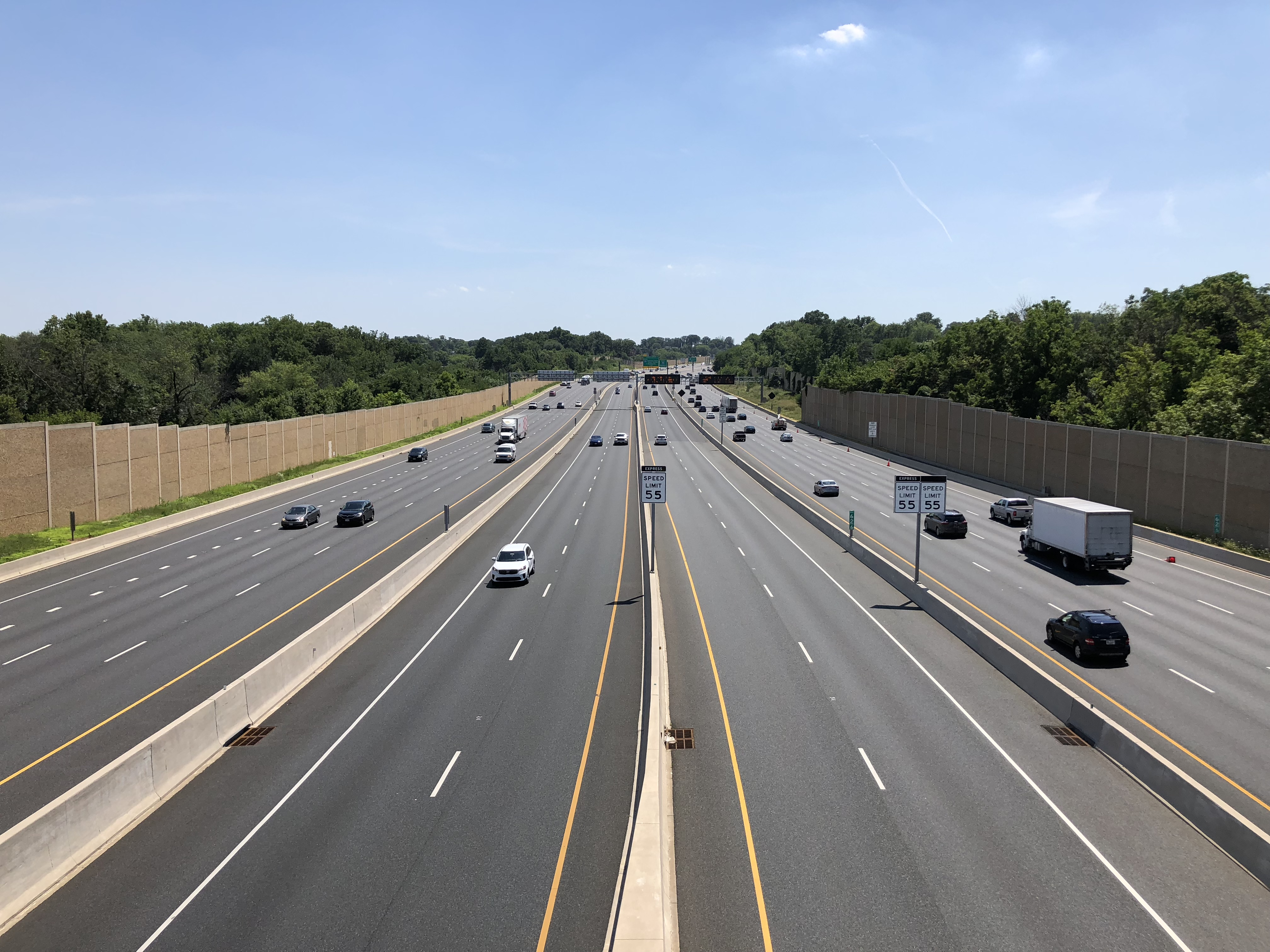
I-95 southbound between I-695 and I-895 in Rosedale, northeast of Baltimore

Originally, there were several changes in jurisdiction over maintenance of Baltimore's segment of I-95. North of the Baltimore city line as far as exit 55 (Key Highway), the route was maintained by the city of Baltimore. Between exits 55 and 57 (Boston Street/O'Donnell Street) the route, traversing the Fort McHenry Tunnel, was maintained by the Maryland Transportation Authority. Between exit 57 and the Baltimore city line the route was again maintained by the city of Baltimore.

Now, between the southern part of the Baltimore city line (near exit 49, the southern I-695 interchange) and the northern Baltimore city line, the route is maintained entirely by the MDTA. Maryland state highway police force and the authority's own police force share police duties on this segment. Additionally, the city of Baltimore pays the MDTA to maintain I-95 within the city limits.

=== Incomplete interchanges ===
I-95 has at least four incomplete interchanges along its route, with three located within the city of Baltimore. Traveling northbound, the first interchange encountered is the College Park Interchange, exit 27. This was the intended site of the northern crossing of I-95 and I-495 and the northern end of the Northeast Freeway. South of here, I-95 was to enter D.C. on the Northeast Freeway, continue on the North Central Freeway and connect seamlessly to the portion of I-95 in Downtown Washington that had been completed from there to the Springfield Interchange in Virginia. While the College Park Interchange was completed, the Northeast Freeway was never built, resulting in highway lanes coming to an abrupt end on the south end of the interchange. After the project to complete I-95 through the District of Columbia was canceled, I-95 was rerouted onto the Capital Beltway in 1977. The portion of I-95 inside the beltway in Northern Virginia and Washington, D.C. was designated as I-395. The eastern half of the Capital Beltway was renumbered from I-495 to I-95. In 1991, the I-495 designation was restored on the eastern half of the beltway, numbered concurrently with I-95 as part of an effort to provide more consistent numbering and directional indicators on the Capital Beltway. The College Park Interchange was modified in late 1986 to allow free movement along the transition from the I-95 corridor and the Capital Beltway without requiring the use of exit ramps. Today, all parts of the interchange are in regular use. The southern end of the interchange now serves as a park and ride commuter lot.

The other three interchanges are located in the city of Baltimore, a sign of the many successful freeway revolts that accompanied the construction of the 3-A System: the planned eastern terminus of I-70, the planned southern terminus of I-83, and the planned southern terminus of the Windlass Freeway. All three unbuilt interchanges incorporate interchanges with local roads. The first is located near exit 50 in Baltimore; it is the site of the planned eastern terminus of I-70 within the city. The only remnants of the interchange that remain in situ today are the mainline bridges built to grade-separate I-95 and the exit ramps to and from I-70, several ramp stubs, a few grassy abutments. An incomplete flyover bridge once existed as well, but was later demolished. Narrow shoulders through the interchange area show that I-95 narrowed to six lanes but was restriped to widen the highway. While this interchange was left incomplete, the existing exit 50, built with extensive collector–distributor lanes due to its proximity to the unbuilt interchange, stands as a more visible sign of what was planned. Today, exit 50 connects US 1 Alt. to I-95.

The second is located near exit 57, just to the north of the Fort McHenry Tunnel, and is the site of the planned southern terminus of I-83. Like I-70's terminus, the remnants here consist mainly of ramp stubs and unused bridges. This interchange, like exit 50, also serves Boston Street and O'Donnell Street, and also narrowed to six lanes within the interchange area until 2018 when two new lanes were taken from the left shoulders. The interchange would have been a three-way freeway-to-freeway interchange, with a full complement of ramps provided for local access to and from Boston Street and O'Donnell Street, to and from both interstates. Of the two planned Interstate terminuses, I-83's terminus was the first to be abandoned, with the connecting highway segment being cancelled in September 1982; I-70's terminus, later redesignated as a new route, was canceled in July 1983.

The third is encountered at exit 60 and is the site of the southwestern terminus of the Windlass Freeway, a relief route for US 40 (part of the route was eventually built and is today part of I-695). The interchange that exists at this site is in partial use, serving the Moravia Road freeway spur; like the other two inner-city locations, ramp stubs mark the site of the ramps to and from the unbuilt freeway.

=== Major events ===
- On January 13, 2004, a tanker truck carrying flammable liquid fell off the southbound ramp from the Harbor Tunnel Thruway to I-95, landing on the travel lanes and causing a massive explosion, crushing several vehicles and killing four people. Despite this, no damage was done to either highway and both were reopened early in the morning on January 14, 2004.
- On October 16, 2004, a sudden hailstorm just north of Baltimore caused a string of 33 accidents, involving at least 130 vehicles, in an 11-mile (18 km) stretch of I-95. Both northbound and southbound lanes were closed down. The northbound lanes were reopened seven hours later, and the southbound lanes required a further 12 hours to clean.
- On January 16, 2007, an exhausted truck driver lost control of his tanker truck, causing it to overturn on the northbound carriageway near Maryland House in Harford County. The route was closed for a time when leaks were discovered in the tank, which was carrying a corrosive alkaline material; the outermost right lane remained closed until 3:00 pm that day.
- On October 4, 2008, at around 2:00 am, a tanker carrying acetone overturned on the southbound lanes south of exit 85, closing down both the northbound and southbound lanes for over eight hours. According to Maryland State Police, the tanker leaked acetone and other flammable liquids after overturning. Four others were also involved in the crash and were taken to R Adams Cowley Shock Trauma Center in Baltimore. Both the northbound and southbound lanes reopened at around 11:00 am on the same day.

=== Improvements ===
Due to the heavy use of this route by commuters and through traffic, the Maryland Transportation Authority has begun the process of significantly expanding the highway to increase its capacity. The expansion plans are divided into short, individual sections; in 2001, the Maryland Transportation Authority began public studies to determine the best way to expand the highway to meet current and future needs. After four years of study, the Maryland Transportation Authority issued its results for Section 100, the southernmost section.

There may be the future consideration of replacing New York City with the much closer Philadelphia as the control city on I-95 north, north of Baltimore, as I-95 is fully completed between Philadelphia and New York City.

==== Section 100 ====
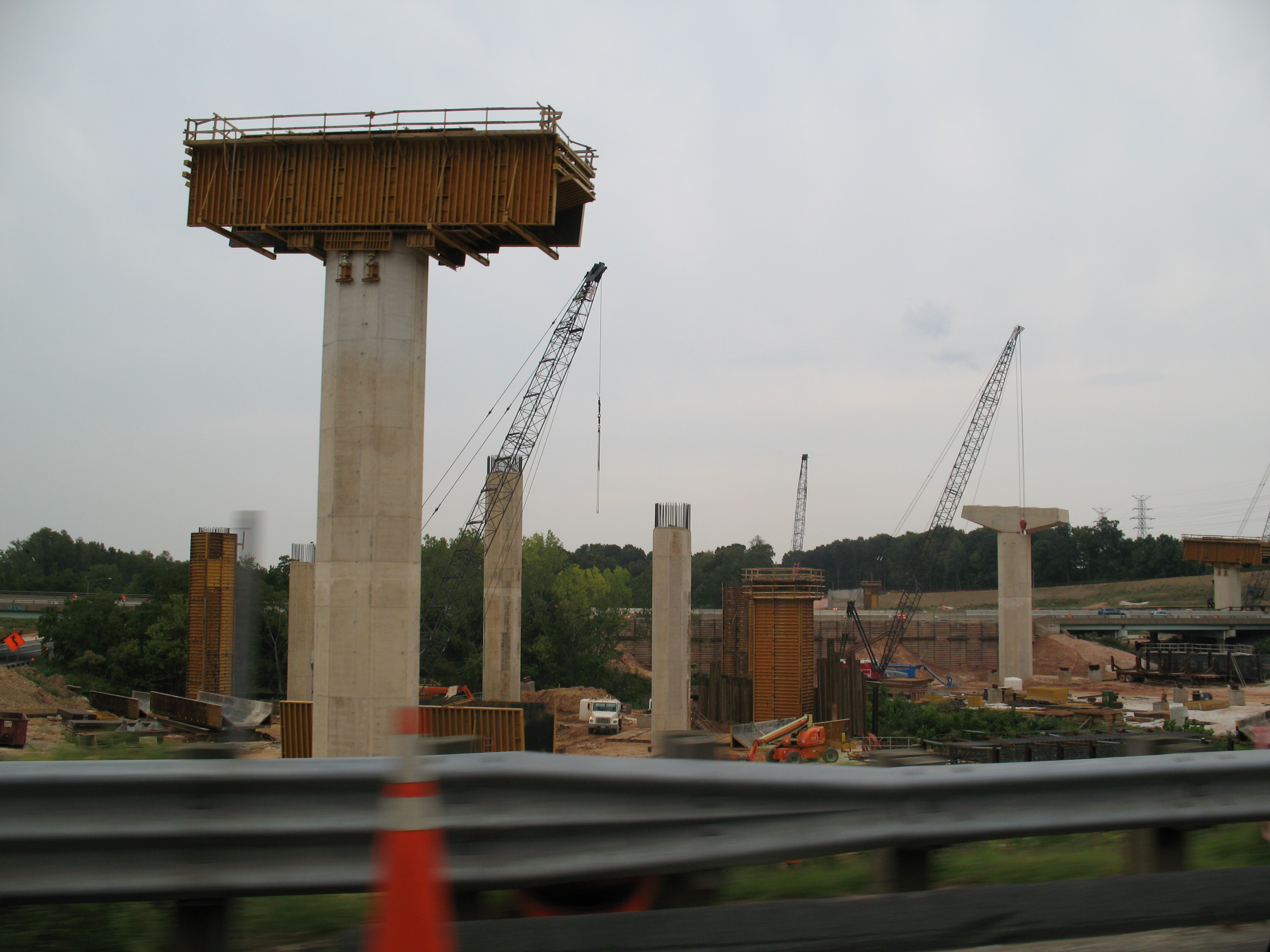
Construction of the eastern interchange of I-95 and I-695

Section 100 is an eight-mile (13 km) segment of the John F. Kennedy Memorial Highway that runs between exit 62 (I-895) and milepost 70. This segment used to be just eight lanes wide (a 4–4 configuration) and carries approximately 165,000 vehicles per day (expected to increase to 225,000 vehicles per day by 2025). This segment has been expanded to 12 lanes (a 4–2–2–4 configuration), with the center lanes designated as express toll lanes. In addition, the interchange between the John F. Kennedy Memorial Highway and the Baltimore Beltway at exit 64 has been rebuilt into a more orthodox stack interchange, removing the left entrances and exits as well as the unique carriageway crossovers on I-95 (the carriageway crossovers on I-695 there remained, but those have since been removed as well). The interchange at exit 67 (MD 43) has been significantly modified from its former cloverleaf configuration, and the interchange at exit 62 was also reconfigured so that I-95 is now the straight-ahead route instead of I-895, thus eliminating the need for southbound I-95 traffic to weave to the right and cross over.

The project cost $1.1 billion (equivalent to $1.43 billion in 2024). It began in 2006 and was completed in 2014.

The remainder of the section between Exit 67 and milepost 70 (as of December 18, 2024) has been widened to a 4-2-4 configuration (four southbound general purpose lanes, two northbound express lanes, and four northbound general purpose lanes) to extend the northbound express lanes to milepost 77.

==== Section 200 ====
Section 200 is a 15-mile (24 km) segment from milepost 70 to exit 85 (MD 22). This segment is also currently eight lanes wide (a 4–4 configuration) as far as exit 77 (MD 24) and is currently six lanes wide (a 3–3 configuration) between exits 77 and 85. Like Section 100, this segment will be widened into a 4–2–2–4 configuration as far as exit 80 (MD 543). Between exits 80 and 85, the remainder will likely be widened from a 3–3 configuration to a 4–4 configuration. While the Maryland Transportation Authority has not yet finalized plans for this segment, the MD 24 interchange was improved, with the interchange improvement project completed in 2009.

The segment between mileposts 70 and 79 is currently being widened to a 4-2-4 configuration, which will extend the current northbound express lanes to just south of MD 543. The MD 152 and MD 24 interchanges will be reconstructed along with multiple overpasses and underpasses. The reconstruction of the MD 152 interchange had the Old Mountain Road bridge demolished and will relocate the park-and-ride lot just south of the older facility and will be accessed through a roundabout. The project is expected to be complete by 2026.

The segment between the MD 43 and MD 152 interchanges has been completed and opened to traffic on December 18, 2024. The segment between Bynum Run and the MD 152 is under construction, the overpasses and underpasses have been completed, and the MD 24 interchange is under construction as of December 18, 2024.

==== Section 300 ====
Section 300 is an eight-mile (13 km) segment from exit 85 to exit 93, roughly between Aberdeen and Perryville. Widening this segment will require reconstruction of the Millard E. Tydings Memorial Bridge over the Susquehanna River.

==== Section 400 ====
Section 400, the longest segment, is 16 miles (26 km) long and stretches from exit 93 to the Delaware state line. This segment is six lanes wide (a 3–3 configuration) and two of three master plan concepts recommend its widening to a 4–4 configuration.

==== Between the beltways ====
A study is currently underway to consider adding a new lane on each side between I-495 and I-695. This would be done by constructing new inner shoulders on the median and converting the existing inner shoulders to high-occupancy vehicle lanes that would be open to vehicles with three or more occupants and hybrid, electric, emergency, and other official government vehicles.

==== Proposed relocation of toll plaza ====
The Maryland Transportation Authority, at the request of an assortment of elected officials, completed a study which examined a relocation of the northbound toll barrier, which is currently just north of the Millard E. Tydings Memorial Bridge crossing of the Susquehanna River at Perryville. The study concluded the barrier should remain where it is, because "relocating the toll plaza from the current location would result in significant diversion from I-95 onto local Cecil County roads" and "the closer the toll plaza goes to Delaware the greater the diversion there is to local roads, the greater the revenue loss to the state toll operator MDTA, and the more travel there is on slower, less safe surface arterials".

== Exit list ==
County	Location	mi	km	Exit	Destinations	Notes
Potomac River		0.0	0.0		I-95 Local south / I-495 Local west (Capital Beltway) – Richmond	Continuation beyond Maryland
Potomac River		0.0– 1.1	0.0– 1.8	Woodrow Wilson Bridge; Virginia–District of Columbia and District of Columbia–Maryland boundaries (Note: The Woodrow Wilson Bridge crosses through the District of Columbia for approximately 300 feet (91 m).)		
Prince George's	Oxon Hill	1.7	2.7	2A-B	I-295 north – Washington, National Harbor	Signed as exits 2A (National Harbor) and 2B (I-295 north); exits 1A and 1C (I-295)
Prince George's	Oxon Hill	2.7	4.3	3A-B (NB) 3 (SB)	MD 210 – Indian Head, Forest Heights	Signed as exits 3A (MD 210 south) and 3B (MD 210 north) northbound; access I-95/I-495 northbound to MD 210 north via Oxon Hill Road
Prince George's	Oxon Hill	2.7	4.3	3A-B (NB) 3 (SB)	MD 210 south – Forest Heights, Indian Head	Northbound exit and southbound entrance for Thru Lanes
Prince George's	Oxon Hill	3.5	5.6	—	I-95 south / I-495 west (Thru Lanes) I-95 Local south / I-495 Local west	North end of Thru Lanes
Prince George's	Oxon Hill	4.3	6.9	4A-B	MD 414 (St. Barnabas Road) – Oxon Hill, Marlow Heights	Split into exits 4A (MD 414 west) and 4B (MD 414 east)
Prince George's	Temple Hills	7.3	11.7	7A-B	MD 5 (Branch Avenue) – Waldorf, Silver Hill	Split into exits 7A (MD 5 south) and 7B (MD 5 north); access to Branch Avenue Station and Metro to Nationals Park via exit 7B
Prince George's	Morningside	9.0	14.5	9	MD 337 (Allentown Road) – Andrews AFB, Morningside	Northbound exit and southbound entrance
Prince George's	Morningside	9.6	15.4	9	MD 337 (Allentown Road) – Andrews AFB, Morningside	Southbound exit and northbound entrance; southbound access via Forestville Road
Prince George's	Forestville	10.7	17.2	11	MD 4 (Pennsylvania Avenue) – Upper Marlboro, Washington	Split into exits 11A (MD 4 south/east) and 11B (MD 4 north/west)
Prince George's	Largo	13.1	21.1	13	Ritchie–Marlboro Road – Upper Marlboro, Capitol Heights	
Prince George's	Largo	14.7	23.7	15 (NB) 15A-B (SB)	MD 214 (Central Avenue) – Largo, Seat Pleasant	Signed as exit 15 northbound and split into exits 15A (MD 214 east) and 15B (MD 214 west) southbound; access to Northwest Stadium
Prince George's	Largo	15.8	25.4	16	Medical Center Drive	Access to Northwest Stadium
Prince George's	Landover	16.5	26.6	17 (NB) 17A-B (SB)	MD 202 (Landover Road) – Upper Marlboro, Bladensburg	Signed as exit 17 northbound and split into exits 17A (MD 202 south) and 17B (MD 202 north) southbound; access to Northwest Stadium, Downtown Largo, and Nationals Park via Metro
Prince George's	Glenarden	18.5	29.8	19	US 50 – Annapolis, Washington, New Carrollton station	Split into exits 19A (US 50 east) and 19B (US 50 west); US 50 is concurrently with unsigned I-595; access to New Carrollton Station and Nationals Park via Metro from southbound ramp to westbound US 50
Prince George's	New Carrollton	19.5	31.4	20	MD 450 (Annapolis Road) – Lanham, Bladensburg	Split into exits 20A (MD 450 east) and 20B (MD 450 west)
Prince George's	Greenbelt	22.1	35.6	22A-B	Baltimore–Washington Parkway – Baltimore, Washington	Split into exits 22A (north) and 22B (south); no commercial vehicles; access to Nationals Park via Metro
Prince George's	Greenbelt	23.0	37.0	23	MD 201 (Kenilworth Avenue) – Greenbelt, Bladensburg	Access to MD 193, Goddard Space Flight Center, University of Maryland, SECU Stadium, and Xfinity Center
Prince George's	Greenbelt	24.2	38.9	24	Greenbelt Station	Southbound exit and northbound entrance; no commercial vehicles
Prince George's	College Park	25.1	40.4	25 (NB) 25A-B (SB)	US 1 (Baltimore Avenue) – Laurel, College Park	Signed as exit 25 northbound and split into exits 25A (north) and 25B (south) southbound
Prince George's	College Park	26.1	42.0	27	I-495 west (Capital Beltway) / Park & Ride – Silver Spring (NB) I-495 west (Capital Beltway) – Silver Spring, Bethesda (SB)	College Park Interchange; north end of the concurrency with I-495; southbound I-95 uses exit 27 to access exit 25 and the park and ride/weigh station; access road to the park and ride is I-95X; Bethesda not signed northbound
Prince George's	Beltsville	28.5	45.9	29A-B	MD 212 – Beltsville, Calverton	Split into exits 29A (east) and 29B (west)
Prince George's	Laurel	30.6	49.2	31A-B 32	MD 200 Toll to I-370 / I-270 / US 1 Konterra Drive	Split into exits 31A (MD 200 east), 31B (MD 200 west) and 32 (Konterra Drive); Muirkirk Station accessed via exit 31A; E-ZPass or toll by plate on MD 200
Prince George's	Laurel	32.7	52.6	33A-B	MD 198 – Laurel, Burtonsville	Split into exits 33A (MD 198 east) and 33B (MD 198 west)
Howard	North Laurel	35.2	56.6	35A-B	MD 216 – Laurel, Scaggsville	Split into exits 35A (east) and 35B (west)
Howard	Savage	38.1	61.3	38A-B	MD 32 – Fort Meade, Columbia	Split into exits 38A (east) and 38B (west)
Howard	Columbia	40.4	65.0	41A-B	MD 175 – Jessup, Columbia	Split into exits 41A (east) and 41B (west)
Howard	Elkridge	42.3	68.1	43A-B	MD 100 – Glen Burnie, Ellicott City	Split into exits 43A (east) and 43B (west)
Howard	Elkridge	45.2	72.7	46	I-895 north (Baltimore Harbor Tunnel Thruway)	Northbound exit and southbound entrance; southern terminus of I-895
Baltimore	Arbutus	46.5	74.8	47A-B	I-195 east / MD 166 – BWI Airport, Catonsville	Split into exits 47A (east) and 47B (north)
Baltimore	Arbutus	48.4	77.9	49A-B	I-695 to I-70 – Glen Burnie, Annapolis, Towson	Split into exits 49A (east) and 49B (west); I-70 and Annapolis signed southbound; hazardous materials/overheight vehicles must use I-695 western loop; Exits 11A-B (I-695)
Baltimore City		49.7	80.0	50A-B	Caton Avenue	Split into exits 50A (south) and 50B (north); access via US 1 Alt.
Baltimore City		50.8	81.8	51	Washington Boulevard	Northbound exit and southbound entrance
Baltimore City		51.6	83.0	52	Russell Street north	Northbound exit and southbound entrance to and from Russell Street
Baltimore City		51.6	83.0	52	MD 295 south (Baltimore–Washington Parkway)	Southbound exit and northbound entrance to and from the Baltimore-Washington Parkway
Baltimore City		52.0	83.7	53	I-395 north – Downtown, Inner Harbor	Southern terminus of I-395; access to Oriole Park at Camden Yards, M&T Bank Stadium, and Baltimore Convention Center
Baltimore City		52.6	84.7	54	MD 2 south (Hanover Street)	Northbound exit and southbound entrance
Baltimore City		53.4	85.9	55	Key Highway – Fort McHenry National Monument	Last northbound exit before toll
Baltimore City		54.0– 55.4	86.9– 89.2	Fort McHenry Tunnel (E-ZPass or toll by plate)		
Baltimore City		55.9	90.0	56	Keith Avenue	Last southbound exit before toll
Baltimore City		56.7	91.2	57	Boston Street	Northbound exit and southbound entrance
Baltimore City		56.9	91.6	57	O'Donnell Street	Southbound exit and northbound entrance
Baltimore City		57.7	92.9	58	Dundalk Avenue south	Northbound exit and southbound entrance
Baltimore City		58.1	93.5	59	MD 150 (Eastern Avenue)	
Baltimore City		59.4	95.6	60	Moravia Road	Northbound exit and southbound entrance
Baltimore City		59.8	96.2	61	US 40 east (Pulaski Highway)	Northbound exit and southbound entrance
Baltimore City		60.4	97.2		I-95 Express north	South end of the express Lanes; northbound exit and southbound entrance, E-ZPass or toll by plate; no access to I-695
Baltimore City		60.5	97.4	62	I-895 south (Baltimore Harbor Tunnel Thruway) – Annapolis	Southbound exit and northbound entrance; northern terminus of I-895
Baltimore	Rosedale			62	I-895 south (Baltimore Harbor Tunnel Thruway) – Annapolis	Southbound exit and northbound entrance for Express Lanes only; northern terminus of I-895
Baltimore	Rosedale	63.3	101.9	64	I-695 – Essex, Towson	Hazardous materials/overheight vehicles must use I-695 western loop; exits 33A-B (I-695)
Baltimore	White Marsh	66.6	107.2	67	MD 43 – White Marsh, Middle River	
Baltimore	White Marsh	66.6	107.2	67	MD 43 – White Marsh, Middle River	Northbound exit, southbound & northbound entrances for Express Lanes only
Baltimore	White Marsh	68.1	109.6		I-95 Express south	North end of the express Lanes; southbound exit and northbound entrance, E-ZPass or toll-by-plate; no access to MD 43 / I-695
Harford	Joppatowne	73.8	118.8	74	MD 152 – Joppa, Fallston	
Harford	Edgewood	76.1	122.5	77	MD 24 / MD 924 (Emmorton Rord) / Tollgate Rord – Edgewood, Bel Air	Split into exits 77A (MD 24) and 77B (MD 924 and Tollgate Road)
Harford	Riverside	79.9	128.6	80	MD 543 – Belcamp	
Harford	Aberdeen	84.3	135.7	85	MD 22 – Aberdeen, Churchville	Northbound exit includes direct exit ramp to MD 132 – Aberdeen Town Center
Harford	Havre de Grace	88.6	142.6	89	MD 155 – Havre de Grace	Last northbound exit before toll
Susquehanna River		90.1– 91.1	145.0– 146.6	Millard E. Tydings Memorial Bridge (northbound toll; E-ZPass or pay-by-plate)		
Cecil	Perryville	92.9	149.5	93	MD 222 – Perryville, Port Deposit	
Cecil	Port Deposit			95	Belvidere Road	Future interchange
Cecil	North East	99.5	160.1	100 (NB) 100A-B (SB)	MD 272 – North East, Rising Sun	Signed as exit 100 northbound and split into exits 100A (south) and 100B (north) southbound
Cecil	Elkton	108.2	174.1	109A-B	MD 279 – Elkton, Newark DE	Split into exits 109A (south) and 109B (north); last northbound exit before toll in Delaware
Cecil	Elkton	109.0	175.4		I-95 north (Delaware Turnpike) – Wilmington	Continuation into Delaware
1.000 mi = 1.609 km; 1.000 km = 0.621 mi: Concurrency terminus; Electronic toll collection; Proposed; Incomplete access

== Auxiliary routes ==
I-95 in Maryland has eight auxiliary routes, more than any other state along the I-95 corridor:

- I-195, a spur into Baltimore/Washington International Airport
- I-295, a southern route into Washington, D.C.
- I-395, a spur into Downtown Baltimore
- I-495, the Capital Beltway
- I-595, the unsigned designation for a segment of US 50 between the Capital Beltway and Annapolis
- I-695, the Baltimore Beltway
- I-795 (not directly connected), a bypass of MD 140 in Reisterstown and Owings Mills
- I-895, the Baltimore Harbor Tunnel Thruway

== Notes ==
Interstate 95
Previous state: District of Columbia	Maryland	Next state: Delaware
