= U.S. Route 1 Alternate (Baltimore, Maryland) =

Highway in Maryland

U.S. Route 1 Alternate
- US 1 Alt. highlighted in red

Route information
- Auxiliary route of US 1
- Maintained by MDSHA and BCDOT
- Length: 3.92 mi (6.31 km)
- Existed: 1949–present

Major junctions
- South end: US 1 in Arbutus
- I-695 in Halethorpe; I-95 in Baltimore
- North end: US 1 in Baltimore

Location
- Country: United States
- State: Maryland
- Counties: Baltimore, Baltimore City

Highway system
- United States Numbered Highway System; List; Special; Divided; Maryland highway system; Interstate; US; State; Scenic Byways

U.S. Route 1 Alternate (US 1 Alt.) is an alternate route of US 1 in the U.S. state of Maryland. The highway runs 3.92 miles (6.31 km) between intersections with US 1 in Arbutus and in Baltimore. US 1 Alt. serves the southwestern Baltimore County community of Halethorpe and connects US 1 with full-access interchanges with Interstate 95 (I-95) and I-695. The Washington Boulevard portion of the alternate route was the original road southwest from Baltimore in the 18th century and was part of the turnpike southwest to Washington, D.C. for much of the 19th century. The highway was paved in the early 1910s, expanded in the late 1910s and late 1920s, and became part of US 1 in 1926. The Caton Avenue portion of the alternate route was improved and expanded in the 1930s to serve as a rerouting of US 1 in southwest Baltimore. US 1 Alt. was created in 1949 when US 1 was moved to its present course through Arbutus and southwest Baltimore. The alternate route's interchanges with I-695 and I-95 were constructed in the late 1950s and mid-1970s, respectively.

== Route description ==
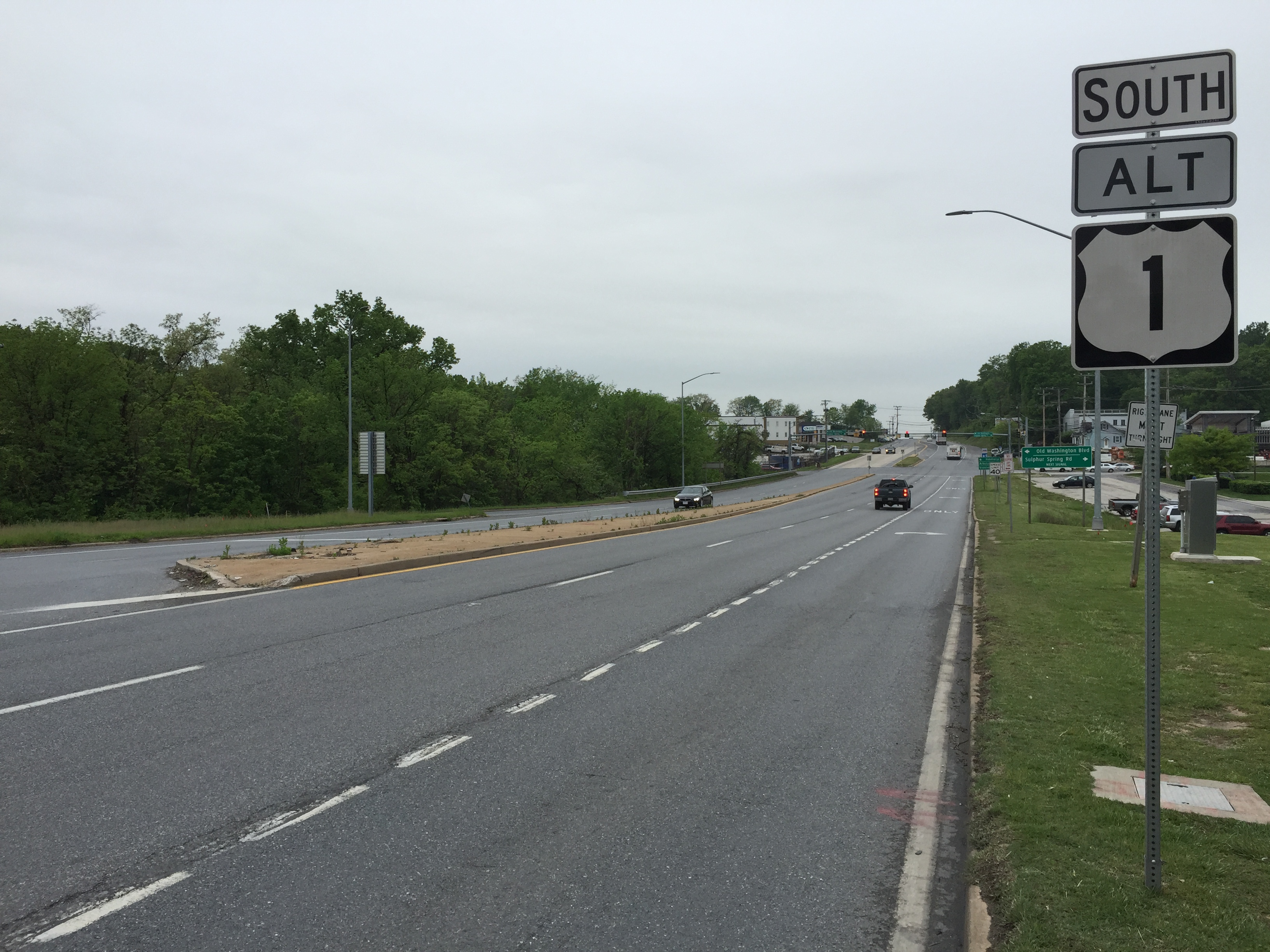
View south along US 1 Alt. in Halethorpe

US 1 Alt. begins at a partial interchange with US 1, which heads north as Southwestern Boulevard through Arbutus and south as Washington Boulevard toward Elkridge. There is no access from southbound US 1 Alt. to northbound US 1 or from southbound US 1 to northbound US 1 Alt. US 1 Alt. heads northeast as Washington Boulevard, a four-lane undivided highway that immediately crosses over Amtrak's Northeast Corridor railroad line, which carries MARC Train's Penn Line, and Herbert Run. The highway passes through Halethorpe, where the route temporarily expands to a divided highway through its three-ramp partial cloverleaf interchange with I-695 (Baltimore Beltway). There is no ramp from eastbound I-695 to US 1 Alt.; that movement is made via a ramp from eastbound I-695 to Sulphur Spring Road, which intersects US 1 Alt. at the I-695 junction, at the I-95–I-695 interchange to the west.

US 1 Alt. continues northeast to an intersection with Caton Avenue and Hammonds Ferry Road just south of the Baltimore city limits. The alternate route leaves Washington Boulevard to turn north onto four-lane divided Caton Avenue and enters the independent city. US 1 Alt. then meets the western end of Patapsco Avenue at a directional intersection from which the latter avenue heads southeast. There is no direct access from Patapsco Avenue to the southbound alternate route or from the northbound alternate route to eastbound Patapsco Avenue; those movements are made via Washington Boulevard. US 1 Alt. heads north as a six-lane divided highway through a seven-ramp partial cloverleaf interchange with I-95. The highway reduces to a four-lane undivided highway and passes by Seton Keough High School, the former Cardinal Gibbons School, and St. Agnes Hospital before reaching its northern terminus at US 1 (Wilkens Avenue). Caton Avenue continues north through western Baltimore toward MD 144 (Frederick Avenue, where it changes to Hilton Street) and US 40.

All of US 1 Alt. is a part of the National Highway System as a principal arterial.

== History ==
Washington Boulevard was first laid out as the highway southwest from Baltimore in 1741 and was improved by the Baltimore and Washington Turnpike Company starting in 1812. After the state condemned the turnpike in 1865, maintenance of the highway became the responsibility of the counties. In 1906, the state took over maintenance as the road as part of its construction of State Road No. 1. The highway from west of the Pennsylvania Railroad (now Amtrak's Northeast Corridor) to the city limits of Baltimore at Gwynns Falls was reconstructed as a 16-foot-wide (4.9 m) concrete road by 1915. The work included a bridge across the Pennsylvania Railroad at Winans. Washington Boulevard was widened to 20 feet (6.1 m) with a pair of two-foot-wide (0.61 m) concrete shoulders and resurfaced with sheet asphalt in 1918, part of a project to expand the entire highway from Washington, D.C. to Baltimore to 20 feet (6.1 m). The highway, which was marked as US 1 in 1926, was widened to 40 feet (12 m) with the addition of a pair of 10-foot-wide (3.0 m) concrete shoulders, and resurfaced with sheet asphalt in the late 1920s.

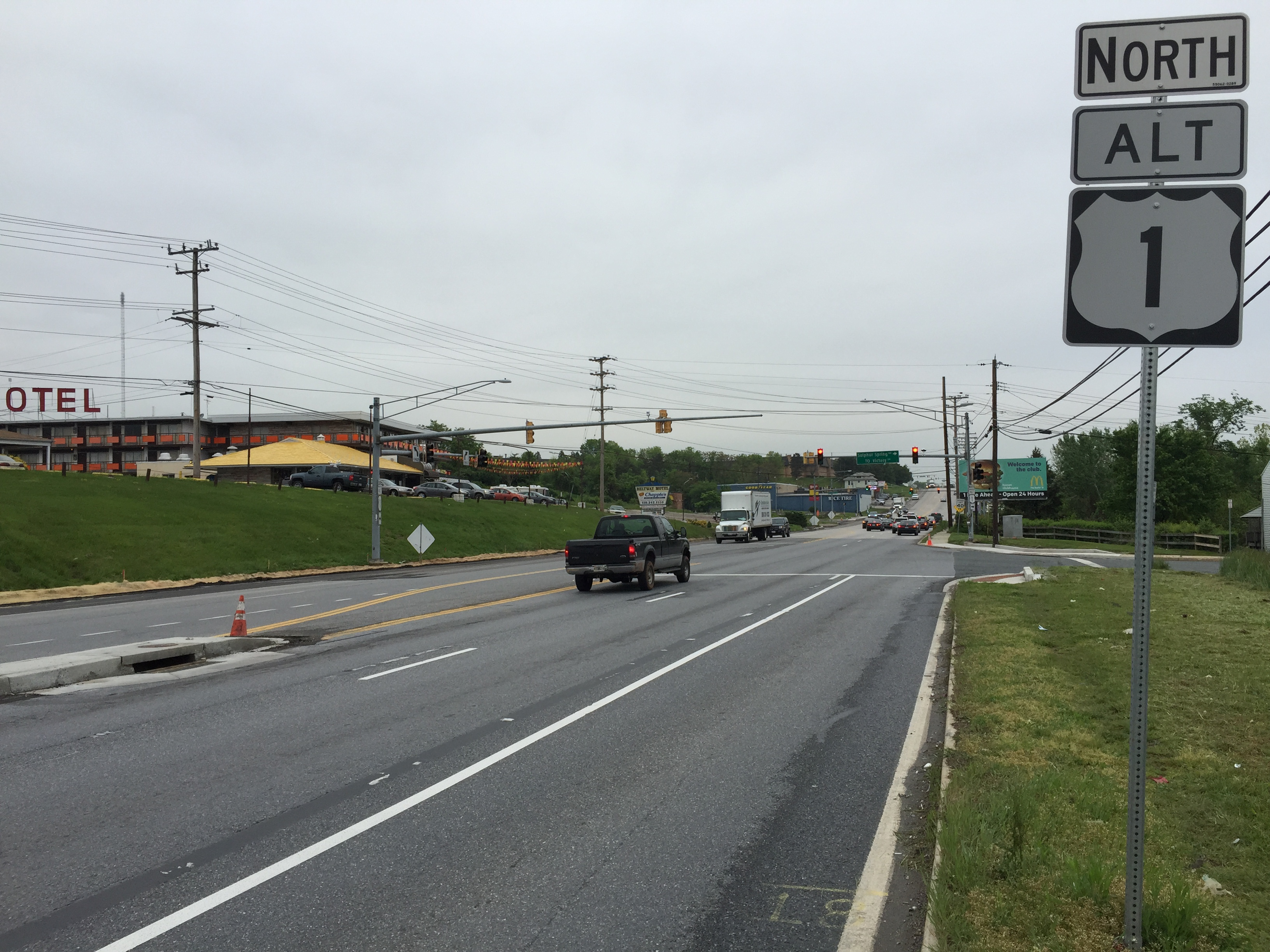
US 1 Alt. northbound past I-695 in Arbutus

Caton Avenue was paved as a concrete road from Washington Boulevard to Wilkens Avenue starting in 1930. Caton Avenue was widened and repaved, along with Wilkens Avenue east from Caton Avenue, in 1936 as part of plans to create through-traffic streets through Baltimore for US 1 and US 40 traffic. That same year, Washington Boulevard's modern bridge across the Pennsylvania Railroad was completed. US 1 originally followed Washington Boulevard and Monroe Street in southwest Baltimore, but the highway was rerouted along Caton Avenue and Wilkens Avenue by 1939. After US 1 was moved to its present course along Wilkens Avenue and Southwestern Boulevard in 1949, the old route of the U.S. Route along Washington Boulevard and Caton Avenue became US 1 Alt.

Further expansion of US 1 Alt. occurred as a result of Interstate Highway construction. The alternate route was expanded to a divided highway on either side of its interchange with I-695 when that interchange was constructed between 1956 and 1958. This interchange included all of the ramps on the east side of the interchange, but, on the west side, it also included ramps from southbound US 1 Alt. to westbound I-695, from southbound US 1 Alt. to eastbound I-695, and from eastbound I-695 to Sulphur Spring Road, which passed closer to the Interstate than it does now. The I-695–US 1 Alt. interchange was reduced to its present ramps after the I-95–I-695 interchange, including that interchange's ramp to relocated Sulphur Spring Road, was completed in 1971. Most of the Caton Avenue portion of US 1 Alt. was expanded to a divided highway in 1972 in conjunction with the completion of the western half of I-95's interchange with US 1 Alt. The eastern half of the I-95 interchange was completed in 1977 when I-95 was extended east to Russell Street.

== Junction list ==
| County | Location | mi | km | Destinations | Notes |
|---|---|---|---|---|---|
| Baltimore | Arbutus | 0.00 | 0.00 | US 1 south (Washington Boulevard) – Elkridge | Southern terminus; northbound exit from and southbound entrance to US 1 |
| Baltimore | Halethorpe | 1.68 | 2.70 | I-695 (Baltimore Beltway) – Towson, Key Bridge | I-695 exit 10; no access from eastbound I-695 to US 1 Alt. |
| Baltimore | Halethorpe | 2.68 | 4.31 | Washington Boulevard north to Patapsco Avenue / Hammonds Ferry Road south | US 1 Alt. turns north onto Caton Avenue; northern terminus of Hammonds Ferry Road |
| Baltimore City | | 2.78 | 4.47 | Patapsco Avenue east | No direct access from Patapsco Avenue to southbound US 1 Alt. or from northbound US 1 Alt. to Patapsco Avenue |
| Baltimore City | | 3.30 | 5.31 | I-95 – Washington, New York | I-95 exit 50 |
| Baltimore City | | 3.92 | 6.31 | US 1 (Wilkens Avenue) / Caton Avenue north | Northern terminus |
1.000 mi = 1.609 km; 1.000 km = 0.621 mi: Incomplete access
