= Northeast Freeway (Washington, D.C.) =

Proposed freeway project

Interstate 95
- Northeast Freeway
- Proposed Northeast Freeway corridor highlighted in red

Route information
- Existed: 1971–1977 (never built)

Location
- Country: United States

Highway system
- Interstate Highway System; Main; Auxiliary; Suffixed; Business; Future

The Northeast Freeway was a planned freeway in Prince George's County, Maryland that would have run from the North Central Freeway in the District of Columbia northeast to the College Park Interchange on the Capital Beltway (I-495). The route would have carried Interstate 95 from the Capital Beltway into the District of Columbia.

The entire route was canceled in 1977 after the government of the District of Columbia canceled the North Central Freeway, cutting off the southern end of the Northeast Freeway from the D.C. freeway network. The cancellation of the route led to the truncation of Interstate 95 at the College Park Interchange and its subsequent rerouting onto the eastern half of the Capital Beltway. The completed portion of I-95 that ran from downtown Washington to the Springfield Interchange in Virginia is now designated as I-395. The stub end of I-95 south of the College Park Interchange in Maryland was converted into a Park & Ride lot in 1986, and a new flyover ramp was constructed for the southbound direction to allow a seamless merge with eastbound I-495.

== Route description ==
As proposed in the 1971 D.C. Interstate System program, the Northeast Freeway, eight lanes wide, would have separated from the North Central Freeway south of Takoma, Washington, D.C., running northeast out of the District in the vicinity of New Hampshire Avenue. Exiting the District, it would have merged with the Pepco power line corridor and run straight northeast, crossing Northwest Branch Park in the outer suburban area. (A portion of the current I-95 route parallels the Pepco power line corridor from I-495 to the Old Gunpowder Road overpass, just past Exit 29.) The route would have merged with the College Park Interchange on the Capital Beltway, joining the segment of I-95 completed in 1971, continuing it northeast to Baltimore, Maryland.

== History ==
=== 1963-64 North Central Freeway Study ===
In a series of proposals published in 1963 and 1964, the subsequent study of the North Central Freeway and Northeast Freeway indirectly ignored the earlier suggestions regarding the use of the B&O railroad corridor; instead, no less than 17 separate alignments were proposed, many of which did not make much use of the railroad alignment.

One important aspect of the study was the consideration of a consolidated route, where the North Central Freeway and Northeast Freeway would join into a single freeway that would then run south to the Inner Loop. Many different alignments, including ones paralleling Georgia Avenue and Sherman Avenue through northern D.C., were considered as part of a consolidated routing of the North Central Freeway south of the Northeast Freeway.

This study stated that the Northeast Freeway should enter D.C. between Gallatin St. and Galloway St., in the vicinity of Michigan Park, where it would run west for 3/4 mile through Fort Drive Circle Park before intercepting the B&O corridor near Fort Totten, Washington, D.C. This plan,a major departure from the 1960 route, was adopted to ensure that the route followed the right-of-way of the circumferential Fort Drive Parkway, thus addressing the complaints of local residents, while conforming with the state of Maryland's plans to run the Northeast Freeway through Northwest Branch Park. The study elucidated three separate options that could be followed once the route reached Fort Totten:

- a route extending west of the B&O railroad to meet a North Central Freeway routed via Georgia Avenue and Sherman Avenue
- a route that would turn south along the railroad and parallel a separately-routed North Central Freeway
- a route that would combine with a North Central Freeway routed via the railroad corridor

The last option was the option recommended by the study.

=== 1966 North Central Freeway Supplementary Study ===
The enormous opposition to the 1964 and 1965 alignments for the North Central Freeway led to a supplementary study being conducted in 1966 that affected the routing of the Northeast Freeway.

As noted above, the Northeast Freeway (I-95) was to enter the District via the Fort Drive route. The 1966 plans included several changes to the junction with the North Central Freeway; one lane per carriageway from I-95 would connect with ramps to and from North Capitol Street, while the remaining three lanes per carriageway would join with the six-lane North Central Freeway. 'Round-the-corner' connections between I-95 south and I-70S north, and between I-70S south and I-95 north, were also removed from the junction in the 1966 study. Otherwise, few modifications were made to the routing of the Northeast Freeway.

=== 1971 De Leuw-Weese Study ===
In 1971, a study released by De Leuw-Weese defined a new route for the Northeast Freeway that had a significantly lower impact on surrounding neighborhoods. I-95 was planned as an eight-lane freeway within a 250-foot (76 m) right-of-way; it would have run entirely within the Pepco power line corridor, and would have entered D.C. in the vicinity of New Hampshire Avenue, following it for 3,200 feet (980 m) in a depressed roadway configuration, before burrowing beneath it to join and parallel the B&O railroad corridor. The median of this route was planned as a transit right-of-way; the transit line was later built as the WMATA Green Line.

The study described this routing as superior to previous routings, especially in terms of cost and complexity of construction. The study concluded that the route as proposed, between the Union Station interchange and the College Park Interchange (thus including the connecting segment of the North Central Freeway), would have been 8.6 miles (13.8 km) in length, cost only $176 million to construct, and would have displaced a maximum of 59 homes in the District and 110 in Maryland, with most of the displacements a result of expansive interchange design.

=== 1973 Pepco Route ===
In 1973, this routing was adopted by the Maryland State Highway Administration for official study. However, this routing was modified somewhat from the 1971 plan; the Northeast Freeway segment was narrowed to six lanes, in a 2-2-2 configuration with a center reversible roadway. It would have crossed Northwest Branch Park in a cut-and-cover tunnel, and the burrowed crossing of New Hampshire Avenue in Maryland next to the southern end of the Pepco route linking the Northeast Freeway with the North Central Freeway was replaced with an elevated, sharply curved crossing with a 55 mph (89 km/h) design speed (the remainder of the route would be 70 mph), necessitated by the challenging topography of the area and the need to avoid rebuilding the Pepco substation. The segment along New Hampshire Avenue would have been depressed, with no apparent consideration for a cut and cover segment either in Maryland for new retail development, nor in Washington, D.C., such as for preserving the dignity of the Eastern Star Masonic Home property. This version of the Northeast Freeway would have had only three interchanges at Adelphi Road, University Boulevard (MD 193) and East–West Highway (MD 410).

The routing as proposed by MDOT SHA would have been 4.89 miles (7.87 km) in length, avoided the wholesale destruction of portions of Northwest Branch Park, and displaced a significantly fewer number of homes — only 25 in D.C., and zero in Maryland, mainly due to less expansive interchange designs. However, the 2-2-2 configuration would have resulted in a minimum 25% capacity reduction compared to a 4-4 configuration, though been virtually as wide owing to the extra shoulders from the median carriageway.

== See also ==
- Interstate 495 (Capital Beltway)
- North Central Freeway
- Inner Loop (Washington, D.C.)
