= North Central Freeway (Washington, D.C.) =

North Central Freeway
- Proposed North Central Freeway corridor highlighted in red

Route information
- Existed: 1959–1977 (never built)

Location
- Country: United States
- Federal district: District of Columbia

Highway system
- Streets and Highways of Washington, DC; Interstate; US; DC; State-Named Streets

The North Central Freeway was a planned freeway in the District of Columbia that would have run from the Inner Loop in D.C. to the Capital Beltway (I-495) at Silver Spring.

The entire route was canceled in 1977 amid vitriolic protest from Washington D.C. and Takoma Park residents, angered at earlier proposed alignments for the route through the northern suburbs. The cancellation of the route led to the truncation of Interstate 95 at the College Park Interchange and its subsequent rerouting onto the eastern half of the Capital Beltway, and the truncation of Interstate 70S (now I-270) at its current terminus at Bethesda. (At the same time, Interstate 70N, later I-70, was planned to terminate in Baltimore, Maryland, but it too was truncated due to the cancellation of its own segments within that city.)

== Route description ==
In the final plans published in the 1971 D.C. Interstate System program, the North Central Freeway, ten lanes wide, would have begun at the Union Station interchange (where the East Leg Freeway (I-295), North Leg Freeway (I-66/I-95) and New York Avenue (US 50) would meet) and run north, paralleling the B&O railroad corridor as far as the Brookland area, where it would have entered a 3/4-mile tunnel south of Rhode Island Ave., emerging to the north of Michigan Avenue. Running north it would have continued along the railroad corridor to Fort Totten, Washington, D.C., where it would have junctioned the eight-lane Northeast Freeway. I-95 would have joined the North Central Freeway from the North Leg Freeway and followed it to Fort Totten, where it would have turned east onto the Northeast Freeway and exited the District, eventually junctioning I-495 at the College Park Interchange and continuing on its current alignment towards Baltimore.

The remainder of the North Central Freeway, now part of I-70S and six lanes wide, would have continued along the B&O railroad corridor, passing beneath Takoma, Washington, D.C. in a 1/2-mile tunnel, and terminated at a large wye junction with I-495. I-70S would have begun at the southern terminus of the Northeast Expressway and followed the North Central Freeway all the way to I-495, with I-70S following the western leg of the wye and a short section of the Beltway to its existing wye junction in Bethesda.

== Development ==
=== 1959 North Central Freeway ===
In 1959, the Mass Transportation Plan outlined a North Central Freeway routing that would parallel Georgia Avenue through northern D.C. However, no detailed studies into the feasibility or impact of this route were undertaken at the time. A later study conducted in 1964 included diagrams of the 1959 route, but with the roadway in a 4-2-4 configuration instead of a 3-3 configuration.

=== 1962 North Central Freeway ===
In November 1962, the Kennedy administration released a document "Recommendations for Transportation in the National Capital Region; A Report to the President for transmittal to Congress by the National Capital Transportation Agency".

It replaced the 1959 concept of 3 separate northern radial mixed traffic highways with that of a 2 into 1 "Y" route for a North Central Freeway as inside-the-Beltway I-70S, joined by an I-95 North East Freeway near Fort Totten, and continue together as the I-95 North Central Freeway.

The I-70S and I-95 portions of the North Central would be routed along the existing B&O Metropolitan Branch RR (today's WMATA Red Line). Accordingly, this avoids "the substantial relocation of persons, loss of taxable property and disruption of neighborhoods that would result from construction of the Northeast, North Central and Northwest Freeways proposed in the 1959 plan. Further savings are realized by placing the rapid transit lines to Silver Spring and Queen's Chapel in this same railroad corridor."

This B&O "Y" route concept North Central Freeway was later politically undermined by planning that failed to follow it.

=== 1963-64 North Central Freeway Study ===
In a series of proposals published in 1963 and 1964, the subsequent study of the North Central Freeway and Northeast Freeway indirectly ignored earlier suggestions regarding the use of the B&O railroad corridor; instead, no fewer than 17 separate alignments were proposed for the NCF south of the Northeast Freeway, and a staggering 35 were proposed for the NCF (I-70S) north of it, many of which did not make much use of the railroad alignment.

One important aspect of the study was the consideration of consolidating the North Central Freeway (I-70S) and Northeast Freeway (I-95) into a single freeway that would run south to the Inner Loop (designated solely as I-95). Many different alignments, including ones paralleling Georgia Avenue and Sherman Avenue through northern D.C., were considered as part of a consolidated routing of the North Central Freeway south of the Northeast Freeway.

The study as a whole generally rejected alignments paralleling Georgia Avenue in favor of alignments along the B&O railroad, primarily due to the residential nature of the former and the disruption that the route would engender if sent through it. However, it did not reject out-of-hand the concept of separate routings for the North Central Freeway and the Northeast Freeway due to concerns that the former would not be able to handle the traffic levels of both routes combined. Twelve of the alternate routes considered by the study had this separated route approach, with the North Central Freeway routed via Georgia Avenue and Sherman Avenue; the other 5 advocated the consolidated alignment. Many of the alignments proposed for the North Central Freeway north of I-95 would have resulted in wholesale neighborhood demolition, with hundreds of homes completely removed to make space for the freeway and the expansive interchanges planned for it.

The study itself recommended the construction of a consolidated alignment, with the North Central Freeway following the B&O all the way through the District and outside it, within the Capital Beltway, before turning to follow 16th St. to the Beltway, which it would meet, and continue north of, near Sligo Park. Surprisingly, the study stated that the North Central Freeway north of the Beltway would not carry an Interstate designation throughout.

=== 1966 Supplementary Study ===
The enormous opposition to the 1964 and 1965 alignments for the North Central Freeway led to a supplementary study being conducted in 1966 that more closely examined routings that paralleled the existing B&O railroad corridor. Most of the alternatives created during this study retained a six-lane configuration for the northern I-70S segment and an eight-lane configuration for the southern I-95 segment. Three major options were considered:

- a high-level option, with the freeway elevated over the railroad, allowing most of the industrial properties to remain in situ
- a low-level option, with the freeway directly adjacent to the railroad or slightly below it
- a below-grade option, with the railroad and Metro facilities suspended over the freeway
- a concealed-railroad option, with the railroad and Metro buried beneath the freeway alignment

The option chosen was the low-level option. Tunnels would be constructed in the vicinity of Montgomery College, and the freeway would be depressed in the Brookland area. However, in the Takoma Park, Washington, D.C. the freeway would be slightly elevated, yet the crossing of Georgia Avenue would be depressed instead of elevated in the 1964 proposal.

The low-level option relocated the I-70S/I-495 wye interchange to a point 3/4 mile west of Georgia Avenue (MD 97), with the western wye of the interchange closely hugging the railroad alignment on its western edge; various short tunnels would be constructed to carry the freeway across parking lots and under the railroad, where it would join the eastern leg of the wye and continue south as a six-lane freeway. One major characteristic of this alignment, as compared to previous alignments, is its close companionship with the railroad; the separate carriageways would cross under/over it repeatedly to avoid housing developments and other areas; in Takoma Park, the railroad would be flanked by I-70S's carriageways, while south of Van Burean Street the southbound carriageway would shift to the northern side of the railroad and meet the Northeast Freeway near Riggs Road and New Hampshire Avenue.

The 1966 plan included separate ramp connections to and from both freeways and North Capitol Street, but deleted 'round-the-corner' connections to and from southbound I-70S and northbound I-95. South of the Northeast Freeway, the North Central Freeway would run to the east of the railroad, after passing through a 950-foot (290 m) tunnel in the Brookland area. At the point where the railroad curves to the southwest, the freeway would continue south and enter the site of the Union Station interchange, sparing 3 blocks near Jackson St. NE but removing 69 homes in the freeway's path. Also, the 196 plans for the North Central Freeway removed the reversible roadway that had been previously considered.

The final length of the NCF would have been 7.71 miles (12.41 km), cost approximately $193 million to build, and would have displaced 535 homes and 159 businesses. Ultimately, the plan was doomed by further opposition as a direct result of indecisiveness on the part of D.C. and Maryland transportation officials.

=== 1968 Major Transportation Plan ===
In 1968, the U.S. National Capital Planning Commission released an updated Major Transportation Plan for the D.C. area which deleted the North Central Freeway and Northeast Freeway from the city's freeway grid. Traffic that would have made use of these freeway corridors was expected to either use the local street grid or the Capital Beltway. I-70S would have terminated on the Capital Beltway (as I-270 does now), and I-95 would have followed New York Avenue to the Baltimore-Washington Parkway, then continued north to its original routing, possibly via the Capital Beltway.

The justification used for this deletion, as recorded in the NCPC's "Red Book", was that traffic with destinations beyond the District should not be permitted to travel through the District, but instead bypass it via the Beltway. Traffic with destinations within the District, as noted above, were expected to use the street grid; the NCPC further justified this by stating that the Interstate Highway System as defined did not guarantee direct inner-city access. Furthermore, the NCPC also baldly stated that the construction of the North Central Freeway would simply provide another way into the District for commuters, which was seen as undesirable and unnecessary.

=== 1971 De Leuw-Weese Study ===
In 1971, a study released by DeLeuw retained the I-70S/I-95 North Central Freeway configuration. The study's various alternatives differed little from one another; one major similarity was the I-70S/I-95 wye junction, with the six-lane I-70S and the eight-lane I-95 (narrowing to six lanes, with the remaining two forming off ramps to North Capitol St.) merging into a 12-lane freeway that would quickly narrow to 10 lanes within the Union Station interchange. The plans included the 3/4-mile Rhode Island Ave.-Michigan Ave. tunnel, as well as revisions to an earlier 1970 proposal that would reduce the number of homes required to be removed from 69 to 34.

== Opposition ==
A group of concerned residents banded together and formed an opposition group called the Emergency Committee on the Transportation Crisis. The group emphasized their assertions that the route was "a white man's road through a black man's bedroom", and frequently interrupted meetings relevant to the highways construction.

=== Reginald H. Booker and the ECTC ===
Reginald H. Booker, an advocate for civil rights and urban reform, led the Emergency Committee on the Transportation Crisis (ECTC) to campaign against the freeway. The ECTC argued that the freeway would lead to the displacement of thousands of Black residents and disrupt communities, while also advocating for improved public transportation as an alternative to freeway expansion.

=== Coalition of Activists ===
The movement against the North Central Freeway was notable for its coalition-building efforts, uniting Black activists, environmentalists, and urban planners. This diverse group highlighted the project's potential environmental and social injustices, leveraging public forums, protests, and media engagement to raise awareness and pressure city officials.

=== Impact and Legacy ===
The concerted efforts of Booker and the broader coalition contributed significantly to the eventual halting of the freeway project. Their activism not only prevented the displacement of communities and the destruction of neighborhoods but also set a for future urban planning and civil rights activists, becoming an early example of the importance of community engagement and environmental justice in city development projects.

== See also ==
- Capital Beltway
- Northeast Freeway
- Inner Loop (Washington, D.C.)
- Intercounty Connector
