= Millard E. Tydings Memorial Bridge =

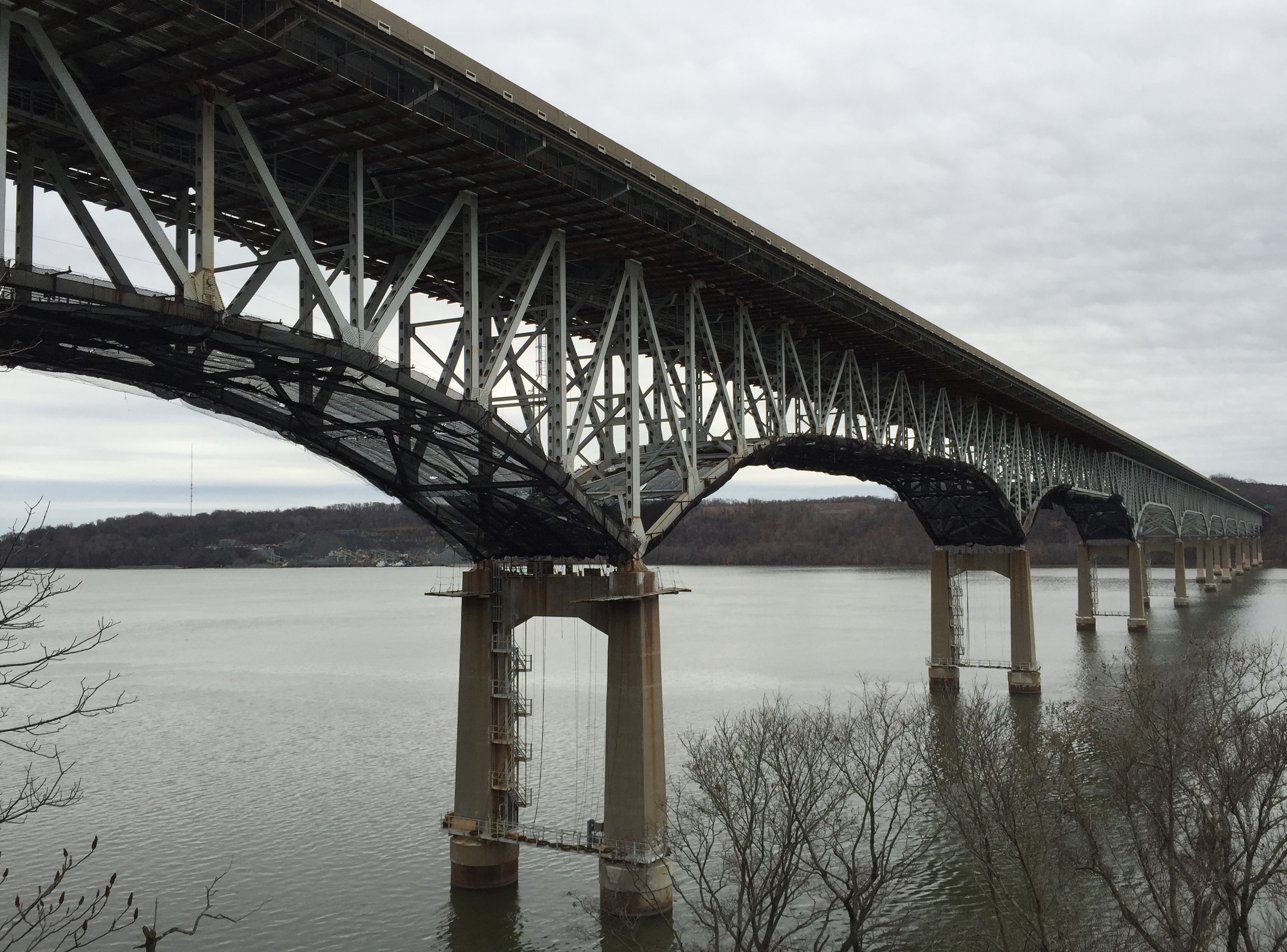
- View of the north side of the bridge from the east bank in 2015
- Coordinates: 39°34′52″N 76°06′14″W
- Carries: 6 lanes of I-95
- Crosses: Susquehanna River
- Locale: Havre de Grace, Maryland and Perryville, Maryland
- Official name: The Millard E. Tydings Memorial Bridge
- Maintained by: Maryland Transportation Authority
- ID number: 300000H-X907010

Characteristics
- Design: Steel Truss – Deck
- Total length: 1,542.6 metres (5,061 ft)
- Width: 25 metres (82 ft)
- Clearance below: 27.4 metres (90 ft)

History
- Opened: 1963; 63 years ago

Statistics
- Daily traffic: 74275 (in 2001)
- Toll: $8 for two axles plus $8 for each additional axle (northbound) (Maryland E-ZPass $6)

Location
- Interactive map of Millard E. Tydings Memorial Bridge

The Millard E. Tydings Memorial Bridge carries Interstate 95 (I-95) over the Susquehanna River between Cecil County and Harford County, Maryland. The toll bridge carries 29 million vehicles annually. It is upstream from the Thomas J. Hatem Memorial Bridge, which carries the parallel U.S. Route 40 (US 40).

The bridge is named for Millard Tydings (1890–1961), a longtime political figure in Maryland who served as U.S. Senator from 1927 to 1951. It was built between January 1962 and November 1963 between bluffs high above the river valley, and is posted with warning signs "Subject to Crosswinds." It was dedicated, along with the highway it carries, by U.S. president John F. Kennedy on November 14, eight days before he was assassinated in Dallas, Texas. The next year, the highway was renamed the John F. Kennedy Memorial Highway.

The bridge is one of eight toll facilities operated by the Maryland Transportation Authority. Tolls are collected in the northbound direction only. The auto toll is $8 with toll-by-plate or an out-of-state E-ZPass and $6 for a Maryland-issued E-ZPass. For larger vehicles, an additional $8 is charged per axle. Tolls were originally collected at a toll plaza to the north of the bridge prior to March 2020, when electronic tolling was implemented in response to the COVID-19 pandemic. All-electronic tolling was made permanent in August 2020, and the toll plaza was subsequently demolished and replaced with an overhead gantry.

The bridge was closed during Hurricane Sandy on October 30, 2012, perhaps the first time it was ever shut down.

== See also ==
- List of crossings of the Susquehanna River
