= Senator Tydings =

Senator Tydings may refer to:

- Millard Tydings (1890-1961), U.S. Congressman and Senator from Maryland
- Joseph Tydings (1928-2018), his son, also a U.S. Senator from Maryland
