= Maryland Route 337 =

State highway in Maryland, United States

Maryland Route 337
- Maryland Route 337 highlighted in red

Route information
- Maintained by MDSHA and NPS
- Length: 3.41 mi (5.49 km)
- Existed: 1927–present

Major junctions
- South end: MD 5 in Camp Springs
- I-95 / I-495 / Suitland Parkway at the Morningside–Forestville line
- North end: MD 4 in Forestville

Location
- Country: United States
- State: Maryland
- Counties: Prince George's

Highway system
- Maryland highway system; Interstate; US; State; Scenic Byways
| ← MD 336 | → US 340 |

Maryland Route 337 (MD 337) is a state highway in the U.S. state of Maryland. Known for most of its length as Allentown Road, the highway runs 3.41 miles (5.49 km) from MD 5 in Camp Springs east to MD 4 near Forestville. MD 337 runs along the southern end of Morningside and the northern edge of Andrews Air Force Base and provides access to several entrances to the military base. The state highway runs concurrently with the easternmost portion of Suitland Parkway. The parkway stretch of MD 337 is maintained by the National Park Service (NPS) instead of the Maryland State Highway Administration (MDSHA). MD 337 was constructed in the mid- to late 1910s along a course further south than the modern highway. The highway was moved to its present alignment to make way for the construction of Andrews Air Force Base during World War II. The easternmost part of the highway was constructed as Suitland Parkway. The Allentown Road portion of MD 337 was expanded to a multi-lane divided highway in the late 1970s and early 1980s. The Suitland Parkway segment was expanded to a divided highway in the mid-1990s. MDSHA plans to build an interchange at MD 337's eastern terminus with MD 4.

== Route description ==
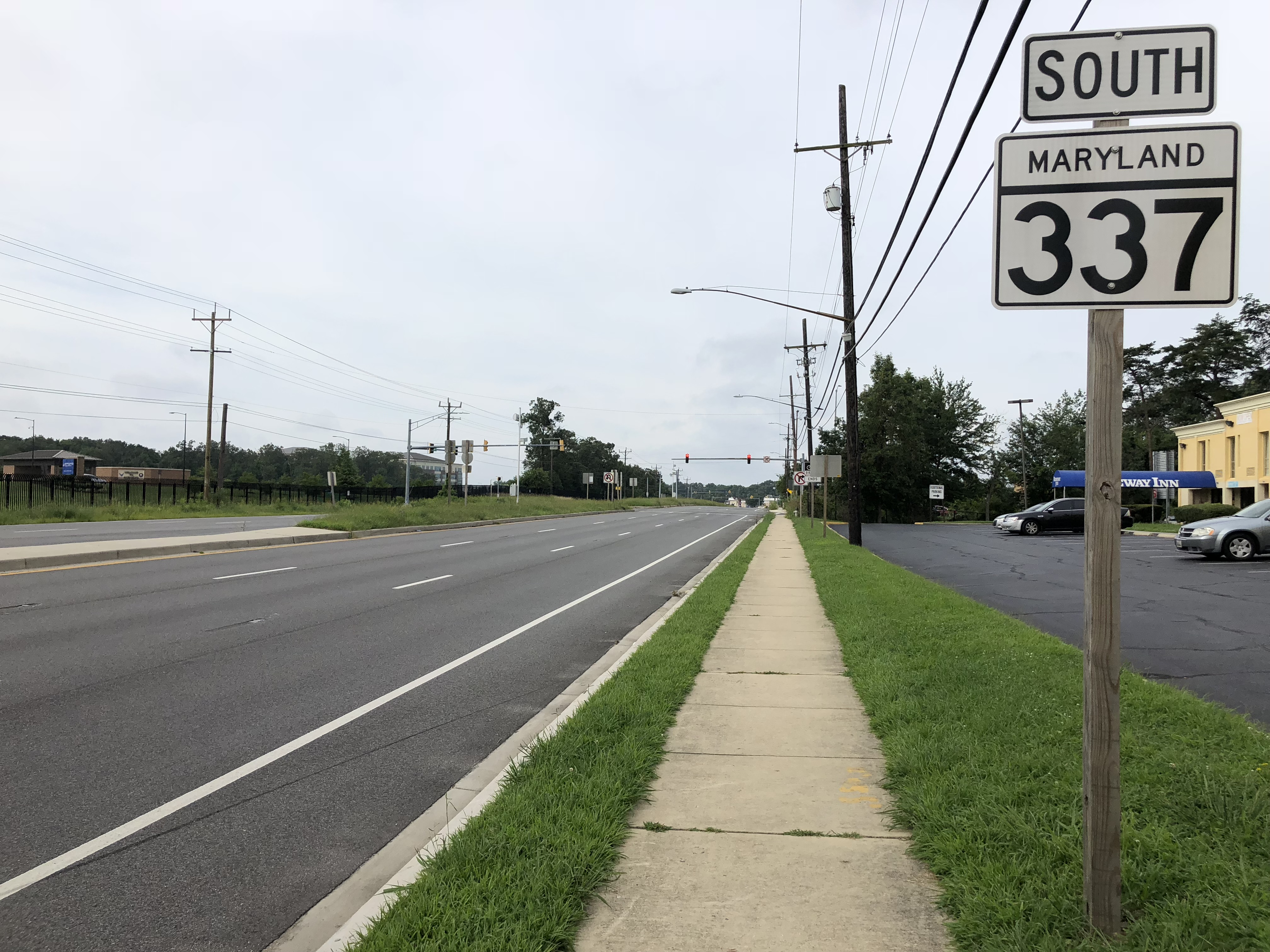
View south along MD 337 in Morningside

MD 337 begins at a single-point urban interchange with MD 5 (Branch Avenue). Allentown Road continues as a county highway west through Camp Springs and the highway intersects Old Branch Avenue just west of the interchange. MD 337 heads northeast as a four-lane divided highway but becomes a four-lane road with a center left-turn lane as the highway begins to follow the northern edge of the Andrews Air Force Base military reservation. At Auth Road, the highway becomes divided again and begins to follow the town limit of Morningside. The highway passes an entrance to the military base, intersects an exit ramp from northbound Interstate 95 (I-95)/I-495 (Capital Beltway), and meets the eastern end of Suitland Road, opposite of which is another entrance to the installation. Suitland Road provides access to the center of Morningside and the southbound direction of the Beltway, which parallels MD 337 along the southern edge of Morningside.

MD 337 meets the southern end of Forestville Road at an intersection that includes a ramp to northbound I-95/I-495. Access from the southbound Beltway and full access to Suitland Parkway is provided via county-maintained Forestville Road. MD 337 becomes an undivided highway, leaves Morningside, and gradually curves to the east away from the Beltway. The highway reduces to two lanes and then becomes one-way eastbound shortly before it merges with the federally maintained Suitland Parkway. Westbound MD 337 traffic follows Suitland Road west to Forestville Road, then heads south on the county highway to connect with Allentown Road. MD 337 becomes state-maintained again at its trumpet interchange with the access road to the north gate of Andrews Air Force Base. The ramp from the base to westbound Suitland Parkway includes a right-in/right-out interchange with Old Marlboro Pike. MD 337 and Suitland Parkway reach their eastern terminus just east of the interchange at MD 4 (Pennsylvania Avenue) southeast of Forestville. The roadway continues east as Presidential Parkway.

MD 337 is part of the main National Highway System from Suitland Road to the ramp to northbound I-95/I-495 and from the north entrance to Andrews Air Force Base to MD 4; the adjacent portion of Suitland Parkway is also part of the main National Highway System.

== History ==
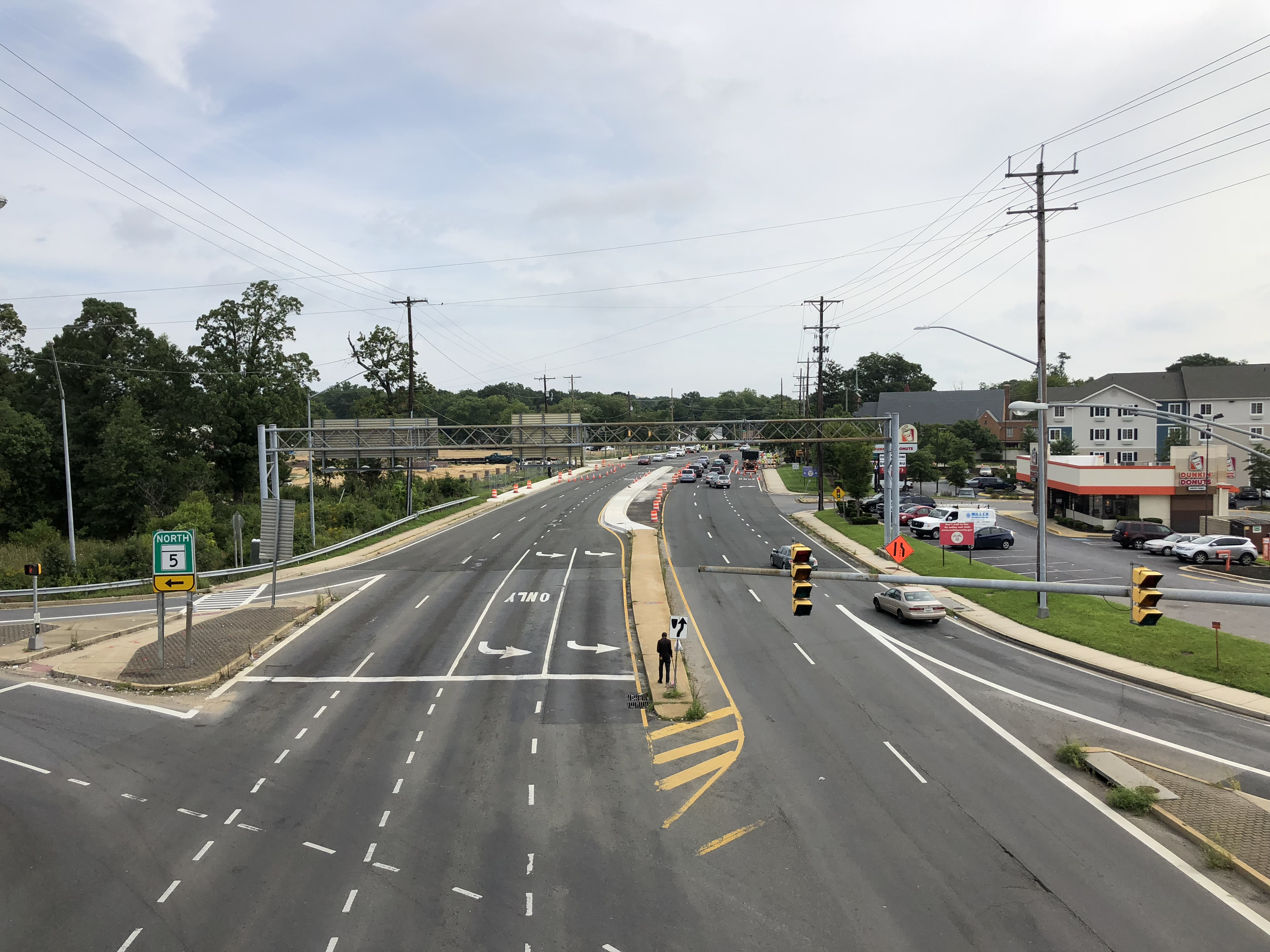
View north along MD 337 from MD 5 in Camp Springs

The road between the Southern Maryland Road at Camp Springs and Marlboro Pike at Meadows was included in the original state road system designed by the Maryland State Roads Commission in 1909. The Meadows Road was built as a 14-foot-wide (4.3 m) concrete road between 1916 and 1919. The highway began at what is today Old Branch Avenue and followed modern Allentown Road east to Auth Road. There, the Meadows Road veered away from MD 337's modern course and headed due east along a road that was mostly obliterated by the construction of Andrews Air Force Base. MD 337's original eastern terminus was at the modern intersection of Fetchet Avenue and Patrick Avenue on the east side of the military reservation. MD 337 was widened with a pair of 3.5-foot-wide (1.1 m) bituminous shoulders for its whole length between 1940 and 1942.

MD 337 east of Auth Road was relocated for the construction of Andrews Air Force Base during World War II. The easternmost portion of the new road became part of federally maintained Suitland Parkway. The trumpet interchange that provides access to the military reservation's north gate from the parkway was built in 1944; the ramp from the reservation to the westbound parkway included a right-in/right-out interchange with Old Marlboro Pike, which was then MD 714. The parkway had a short divided highway segment between the trumpet interchange and its split with MD 337 at a directional intersection, from which the parkway was two lanes along the current eastbound carriageway; the westbound carriageway was only graded and would be completed later. The portion of MD 337 and Suitland Parkway between the trumpet interchange and MD 4 was transferred from federal to state maintenance in 1970.

The portion of MD 337 west of Auth Road was widened and resurfaced in 1950. The portion of this stretch between the old alignment of MD 5 and its current alignment, which was completed in 1956, was transferred to county maintenance in 1967. MD 337 was expanded to a divided highway at the MD 5 intersection and between Auth Road and Suitland Road in 1977. The latter divided highway was extended to Forestville Road in 1981. MD 337's single-point urban interchange at MD 5 was built in 1996. The portion of Suitland Parkway between the trumpet interchange and MD 4 was expanded to a divided highway in 1995; the remainder of the parkway west from MD 337 to Suitland Road was expanded to a divided highway in 1996. By 1999, the crossover at the MD 337–Suitland Parkway directional intersection was closed, resulting in westbound traffic needing to use Forestville Road to continue on MD 337.

MDSHA plans to reconstruct the junction between Suitland Park and MD 4. The highway administration will coordinate with NPS to limit adverse impacts to the Suitland Parkway and will work around height restrictions due to the runways at the air force base. The plans include a diamond interchange between MD 4 and Suitland Parkway to the west and Presidential Parkway to the east. There will also be a flyover ramp from northbound MD 4 to westbound Suitland Parkway. The ramps from the Andrews Air Force Base access road to eastbound Suitland Parkway and the exit ramp of the right-in/right-out junction with Old Marlboro Pike will be removed. The functions of those ramps will be replaced by a service road between the access road and Old Marlboro Pike and a right-in/right-out interchange with southbound MD 4.

== Junction list ==
The entire route is in Prince George's County.

| Location | mi | km | Destinations | Notes |
|---|---|---|---|---|
| Camp Springs | 0.00 | 0.00 | MD 5 (Branch Avenue) to I-95 / I-495 – Waldorf, Washington | Single-point urban interchange; southern terminus |
| Morningside | 1.61 | 2.59 | I-95 south / I-495 south (Capital Beltway) – Morningside | Exit 9 on I-495 |
| Morningside–Forestville line | 2.20– 2.65 | 3.54– 4.26 | Southern end of limited-access section | |
| Morningside–Forestville line | 2.20– 2.65 | 3.54– 4.26 | I-95 north / I-495 north (Capital Beltway) / Suitland Parkway west / Forestville Road – College Park, Baltimore, Washington | Exit 9 on I-495 |
| Forestville | 3.34 | 5.38 | Andrews AFB North Gate | Trumpet interchange |
| Forestville | 3.41 | 5.49 | MD 4 (Pennsylvania Avenue) – Upper Marlboro, Washington | Northern terminus; at-grade intersection |
1.000 mi = 1.609 km; 1.000 km = 0.621 mi
