= Suitland Parkway =

Parkway in Maryland and Washington D.C.

- Suitland Parkway highlighted in red

Route information
- Maintained by NPS
- Length: 9.1 mi (14.6 km)
- Existed: 1944–present
- Component highways: MD 337 (unsigned) in Forestville, MD
- Restrictions: No trucks east of Alabama Avenue

Major junctions
- West end: I-295 / South Capitol Street in Washington, D.C.
- MD 5 in Suitland, MD; MD 458 in Suitland, MD; I-95 / I-495 / MD 337 in Forestville, MD
- East end: MD 4 in Forestville, MD

Location
- Country: United States
- States: District of Columbia, Maryland
- Counties: Prince George's County, MD

Highway system
- Scenic Byways; National; National Forest; BLM; NPS
- Streets and Highways of Washington, DC; Interstate; US; DC; State-Named Streets
- Maryland highway system; Interstate; US; State; Scenic Byways
- Suitland Parkway
- U.S. National Register of Historic Places
- Nearest city: Suitland, Maryland
- Coordinates: 38°50′49″N 76°58′5″W
- Area: 418.9 acres (169.5 ha)
- Built: 1944
- MPS: Parkways of the National Capital Region MPS
- NRHP reference No.: 95000604
- Added to NRHP: June 2, 1995

The Suitland Parkway is a limited-access parkway in Washington, D.C., and Prince George's County, Maryland, administered and maintained by the U.S. National Park Service (NPS), National Capital Parks-East. The road has partial controlled access with a combination of interchanges and at-grade intersections, but without property access for neighboring land-owners. Conceived in 1937, it was built during World War II to provide a road connection between military facilities in the Washington, D.C. metropolitan area and is named after Suitland, Maryland. It fully opened on December 9, 1944 as the Camp Springs highway, so called because it connected Camp Springs (now Joint Base Andrews) in Prince George's County with Bolling Air Force Base. However one lane of the highway was opened in mid-October 1944.

The Suitland Parkway is 9.35 miles (15.05 km) long. Its eastern terminus is at Pennsylvania Avenue (Maryland Route 4), just outside the Capital Beltway and near Joint Base Andrews. Its western terminus is at Interstate 295 and the northbound approach to the Frederick Douglass Memorial Bridge.

The parkway was listed on the National Register of Historic Places in 1995. It is also part of the National Highway System. The eastern half was a two-lane undivided expressway, and the western half a four-lane divided expressway. In the 1990s the eastern half was doubled in size to match the western half, with that work completed in 1996. Around the same time a 2-mile-long trail, the Suitland Parkway Trail, was constructed from Pomeroy Road to Southern Avenue.

== Route description ==
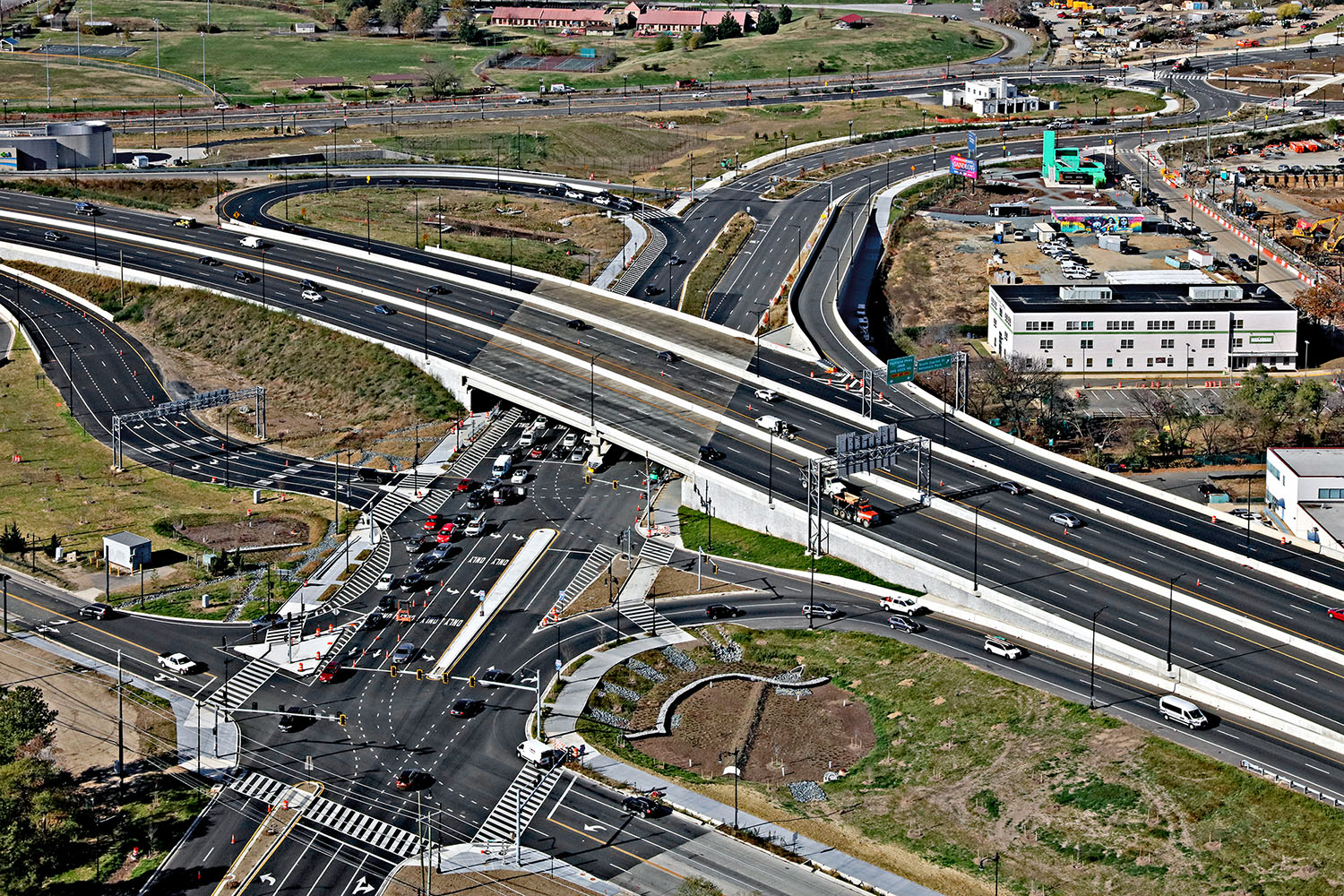
Suitland Parkway and I-295 interchange in Washington, D.C.

The Suitland Parkway begins at an interchange with I-295 and South Capitol Street in Washington, D.C., heading southeast as a four-lane expressway. The road intersects Firth Sterling Avenue SE at a traffic light before passing near residential areas and curving to the south. Just after Firth Sterling Avenue SE, the parkway used to intersect a railroad line at a road crossing. The tracks have been abandoned and removed, but signage for the old railroad crossing can still be seen. The parkway comes to a westbound exit for Sheridan Road SE and an eastbound entrance from Sumner Road SE. that provides access to Martin Luther King, Jr. Avenue SE. At the intersection of Sheridan Road SE and Pomeroy Road SE, a bike path begins and runs parallel to the westbound lanes of the parkway through the remainder of Washington, D.C. Past this, the Suitland Parkway curves east through woods and reaches a traffic light with Stanton Road SE. The road curves southeast and comes to a full interchange with Alabama Avenue SE, with access to and from the westbound direction of the parkway provided by Irving Street SE. Following this, the parkway heads east into woods.

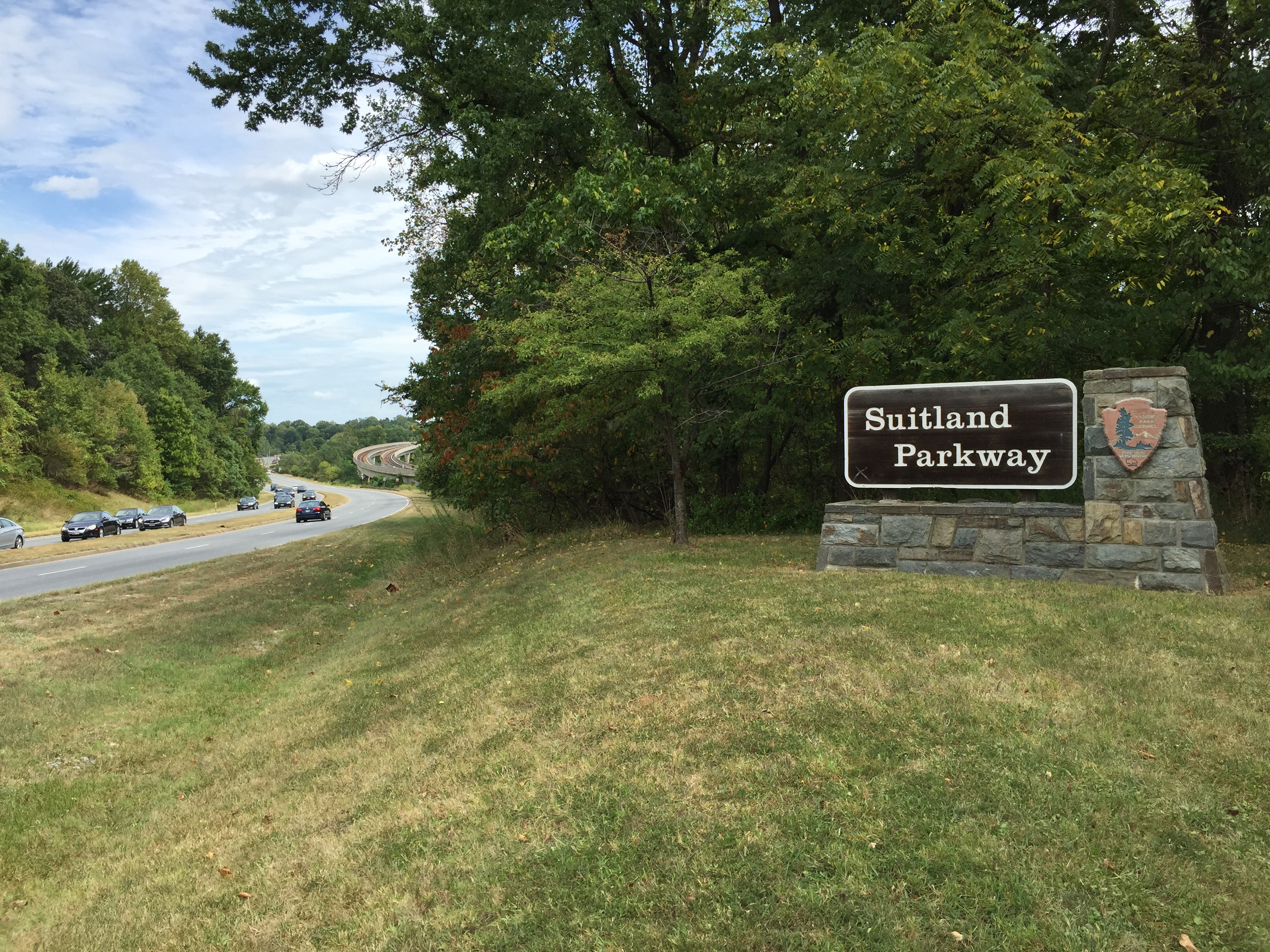
Sign for Suitland Parkway eastbound after entering Maryland

At the bridge that carries Southern Avenue SE over the parkway, the Suitland Parkway enters Prince George's County in Maryland. The road heads northeast into Temple Hills, coming to traffic light with MD 637 north of the Naylor Road station on Washington Metro's Green Line. Left turns are prohibited at the MD 637 intersection. A short distance later, the parkway comes to an interchange with MD 5. Past this interchange, the Suitland Parkway continues east and passes under the Green Line, with the median widening as it continues southeast through woods. The median narrows again as the road comes to an interchange with MD 458 in Suitland near the Suitland station on the Green Line. Past MD 458, the parkway median widens again and the road continues through woodland a short distance to the southwest of the Green Line. The road has an at-grade intersection with Meadowview Drive, which heads south into a residential development, before the subway line passes over the parkway to head south. The Suitland Parkway curves east and the median narrows as the road comes to an interchange with Suitland Road. The road continues east through more woods with nearby development including the incorporated town of Morningside, with the median widening as the road comes to a traffic light with MD 337. It is at this point that southbound MD 337 splits from the westbound Suitland Parkway. The parkway passes under I-95/I-495 without an interchange before northbound MD 337 merges onto the eastbound direction of the parkway via a ramp. At this point, the Suitland Parkway passes to the north of Joint Base Andrews and comes to an interchange that provides access to the north gate of the base. A short distance later, both MD 337 and the Suitland Parkway end at a traffic light with MD 4 in Forestville.

Commercial vehicles, such as trucks, are allowed on the Washington, D.C. portion of the parkway, but must exit at Alabama Avenue.

== Exit list ==
All exits are unnumbered.

State/district	County	Location	mi	km	Destinations	Notes
District of Columbia	City of Washington		0.0	0.0	South Capitol Street – Nationals Park	Roundabout; western terminus
District of Columbia	City of Washington		0.2	0.32	I-295	Exit 4 on I-295
District of Columbia	City of Washington		0.3	0.48	Firth Sterling Avenue	At-grade intersection
District of Columbia	City of Washington		0.8	1.3	Sheridan Road	Westbound exit and eastbound entrance; to Martin Luther King, Jr. Avenue
District of Columbia	City of Washington		1.6	2.6	Stanton Road	At-grade intersection
District of Columbia	City of Washington		2.2	3.5	Alabama Avenue	All trucks must exit
Maryland	Prince George's	Temple Hills	3.1	5.0	Naylor Road (MD 637)	At-grade intersection; no left turns
Maryland	Prince George's	Temple Hills	3.2	5.1	MD 5 (Branch Avenue) – Waldorf	
Maryland	Prince George's	Suitland	4.7	7.6	MD 458 (Silver Hill Road) – Suitland Federal Center	
Maryland	Prince George's	Suitland	6.6	10.6	Suitland Road – Morningside	
Maryland	Prince George's	Forestville	8.0	12.9	I-95 north / I-495 north (Capital Beltway) / Forestville Road (MD 337 south)	At-grade intersection; I-95/I-495 not signed; western end of MD 337 concurrency westbound
Maryland	Prince George's	Forestville	8.5	13.7	MD 337 north (Allentown Road)	Eastbound entrance only; western end of MD 337 concurrency eastbound
Maryland	Prince George's	Forestville	9.0	14.5	Andrews AFB North Gate	
Maryland	Prince George's	Forestville	9.1	14.6	MD 4 (Pennsylvania Avenue) – Washington, Upper Marlboro MD 337 ends	Eastern terminus; northern terminus of MD 337; at-grade intersection
1.000 mi = 1.609 km; 1.000 km = 0.621 mi: Concurrency terminus; Incomplete access
