= Capital Beltway =

Highway in the Washington metropolitan area

Interstate 495
- Capital Beltway
- Capital Beltway highlighted in red

Route information
- Auxiliary route of I-95
- Maintained by VDOT and MDSHA
- Length: 64 mi (103 km)
- Existed: 1961–present
- Component highways: I-95 from Springfield, VA to College Park, MD
- Tourist routes: Star-Spangled Banner Scenic Byway
- NHS: Entire route

Major junctions
- Beltway around Washington, DC
- I-295 in Oxon Hill, MD; US 50 in Glenarden, MD and Dunn Loring, VA; MD 295 in Greenbelt, MD; I-95 in College Park, MD; I-270 in Bethesda, MD; George Washington Parkway in McLean, VA; SR 267 in Tysons, VA; I-66 in Dunn Loring, VA; I-95 / I-395 in Springfield, VA; US 1 in Alexandria, VA and College Park, MD

Location
- Country: United States
- States: District of Columbia, Maryland, Virginia
- Counties: DC: City of Washington; MD: Prince George's, Montgomery; VA: Fairfax, City of Alexandria

Highway system
- Interstate Highway System; Main; Auxiliary; Suffixed; Business; Future
- Maryland highway system; Interstate; US; State; Scenic Byways
- Streets and Highways of Washington, DC; Interstate; US; DC; State-Named Streets
- Virginia Routes; Interstate; US; Primary; Secondary; Byways; History; HOT lanes
← MD 494	MD	→ MD 495
← I-395	DC	→ I-695
← I-464	VA	→ US 501

The Capital Beltway, designated as Interstate Highway 495 (I-495) for its entire length, is an auxiliary Interstate Highway in the Washington metropolitan area. The 64-mile (103 km) beltway encircles Washington, D.C., the capital of the United States, and its inner suburbs in adjacent Maryland and Virginia. It also passes through the capital, near the western end of the Woodrow Wilson Bridge over the Potomac River; Prince George's and Montgomery counties in Maryland and Fairfax County; and the independent city of Alexandria in Virginia.

The route is the basis of the phrase "inside the Beltway", used when referring to issues dealing with U.S. federal government and politics. Its southern and eastern half runs concurrently with I-95. It was constructed in 1964. The Cabin John Parkway, a short connector between I-495 and the Clara Barton Parkway near the Potomac River along the Maryland–Virginia border, is considered an Interstate spur (I-495X) by the Maryland State Highway Administration (MDSHA).

== Route description ==
Except for the westernmost part of Woodrow Wilson Bridge south of Downtown (the water below is considered part of the District of Columbia), the Capital Beltway encircles Washington, D.C., in adjacent Maryland and Virginia. The two directions of travel, clockwise and counterclockwise (looking at a map), have become known respectively as the "Inner Loop" and the "Outer Loop". The route descriptions below follow the direction of the Outer Loop, starting at the Woodrow Wilson Bridge over the Potomac River, south of Washington.

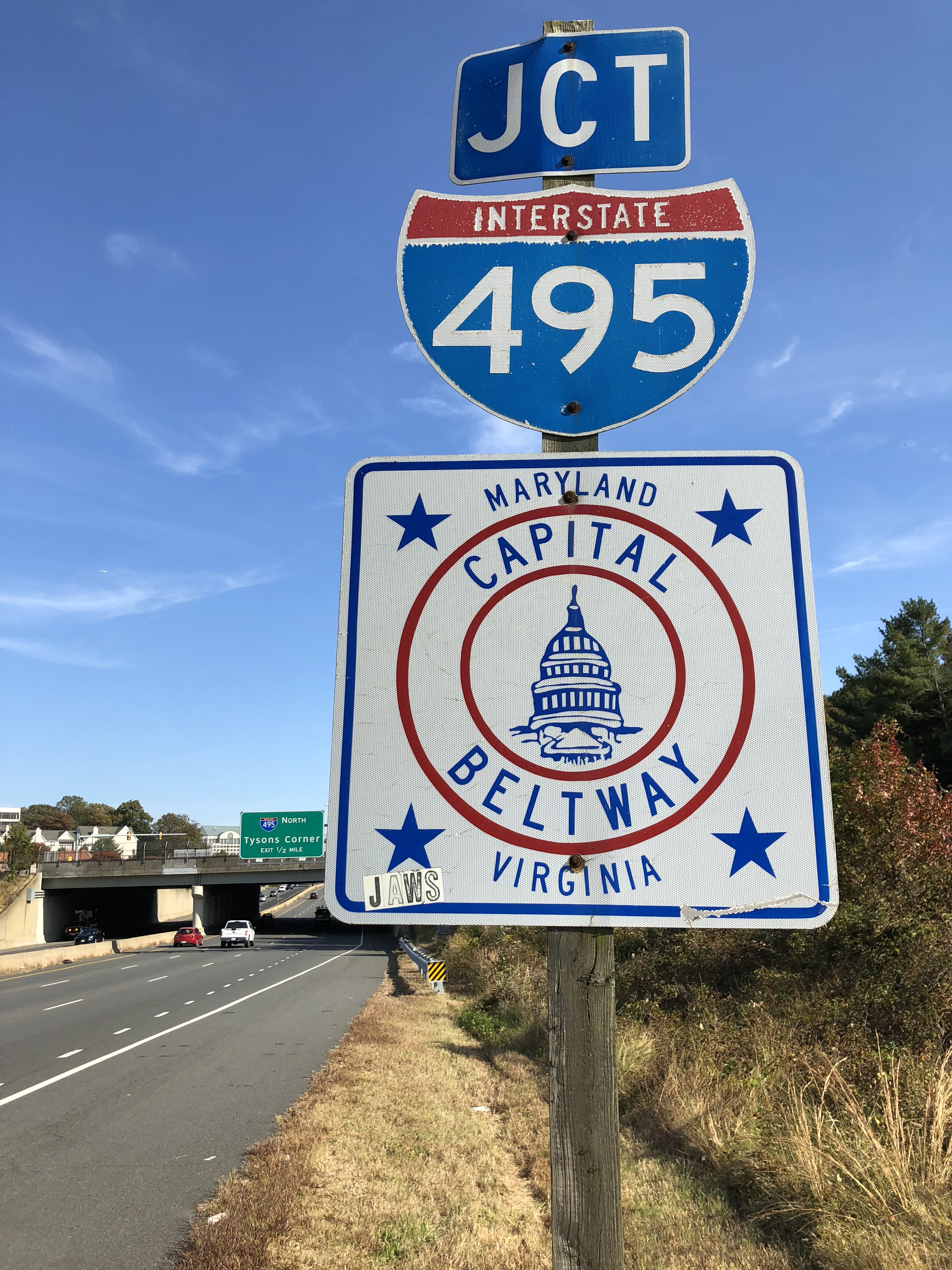
I-495/Capital Beltway signage in Virginia

Most beltway interchanges provide access to Washington, with I-95 and I-295 from the south, I-66 from the west, and U.S. Route 50 (US 50) from the west and the east are among the most frequently used. More scenic routes from the beltway into DC are offered by the George Washington Memorial Parkway along the Virginia side of the Potomac River, the Clara Barton Parkway along the Maryland side of the river, and the Baltimore–Washington Parkway (B–W Parkway), approaching Washington DC from the northeast.

Initially, the entire beltway was simply I-495, and I-95 was planned to serve Downtown from the south and north, intersecting the beltway in Virginia and Maryland. The Virginia segment from Springfield to the D.C. border was completed—however, environmental litigation stopped the completion of the Maryland segment, and the built portion of I-95 inside the beltway from the south northward into Downtown was redesignated I-395 in 1977. The small built portion from the north was converted into a park-and-ride lot. I-95 was then rerouted (and so signed) along the eastern side of the beltway, with the I-495 designation left only along the western side, leaving both routes as bypasses of Washington, D.C. In 1989, the I-495 designation was also returned to the eastern portion, with the highway cosigned as I-95 and I-495 along this route.

=== District of Columbia ===
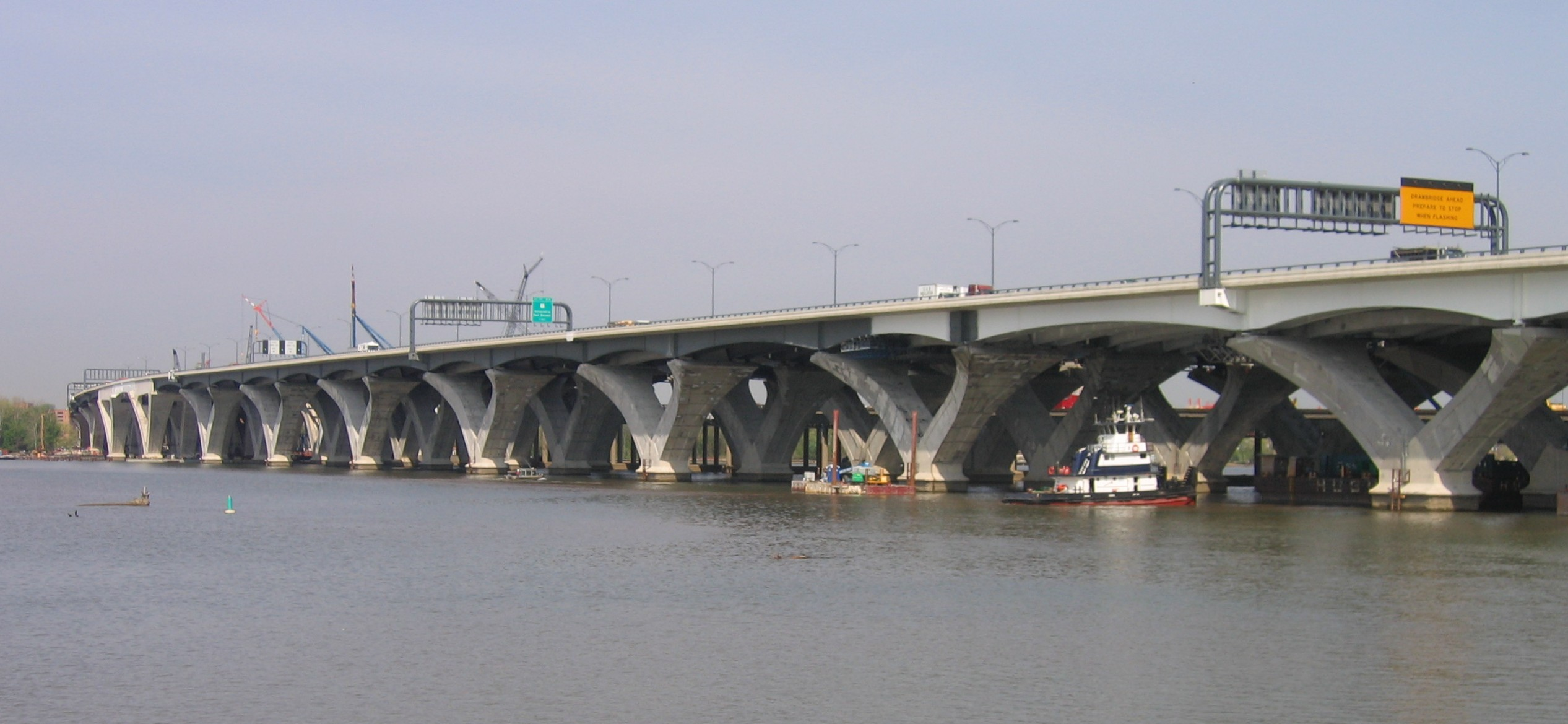
The Woodrow Wilson Bridge carrying I-95/I-495 over the Potomac River between Alexandria, Virginia, and Oxon Hill, Maryland, April 2007

The beltway—here I-95 and I-495 together and four lanes in each direction—travels over the tidal Potomac River on the Woodrow Wilson Bridge between Alexandria, Virginia, and the neighborhood of National Harbor of Oxon Hill, Maryland. The Federal Highway Administration (FHWA) recognizes 0.11 miles (0.18 km) of the bridge as crossing the tip of the southernmost corner of the District of Columbia, but, while there are signs acknowledging the Maryland and Virginia state borders, there are none for DC.

=== Maryland ===
==== Prince George's County ====
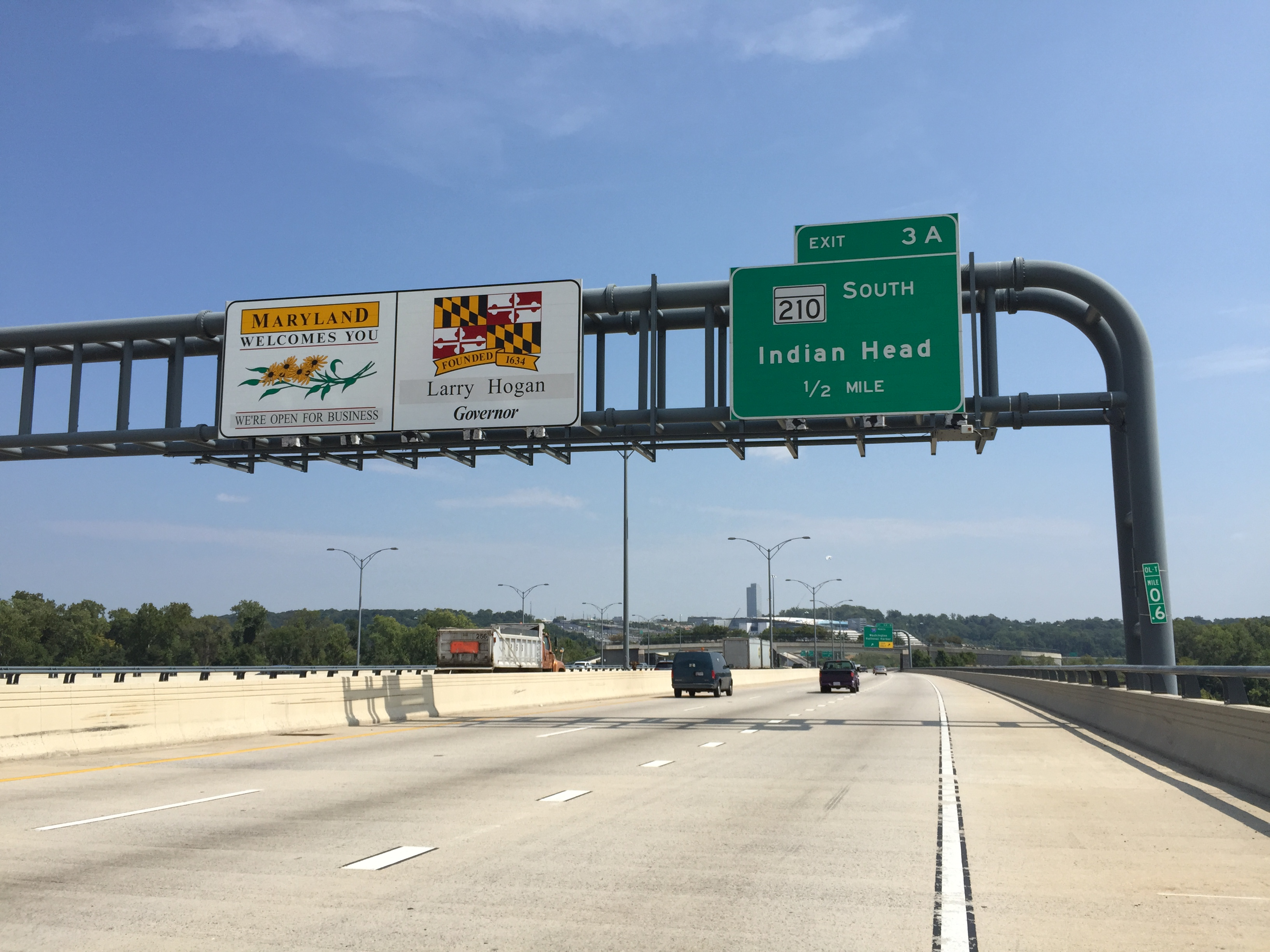
"Maryland Welcomes You" sign on the Outer Loop over the Woodrow Wilson Bridge

The beltway (where I-95 and I-495 together) enters Maryland during its Potomac River crossing over the Woodrow Wilson Bridge, west of Forest Heights and National Harbor as a 10-lane highway with a local–express lane configuration including three local lanes and two express lanes in each direction. After crossing the Potomac River, I-95/I-495 narrows to eight lanes with two local and two express lanes in each direction and immediately meets the southern terminus of I-295, known as the Anacostia Freeway, a route that serves Downtown to the north, connecting in Washington, D.C., to I-695. This large interchange also connects to National Harbor Boulevard, which links the National Harbor with the beltway and I-295. The highway passes south of Oxon Cove Park and Oxon Hill Farm and next intersects Maryland Route 210 (MD 210; Indian Head Highway), a major north–south route from southern DC to Indian Head in Charles County, which also serves the town of Forest Heights to the north at another interconnected interchange.

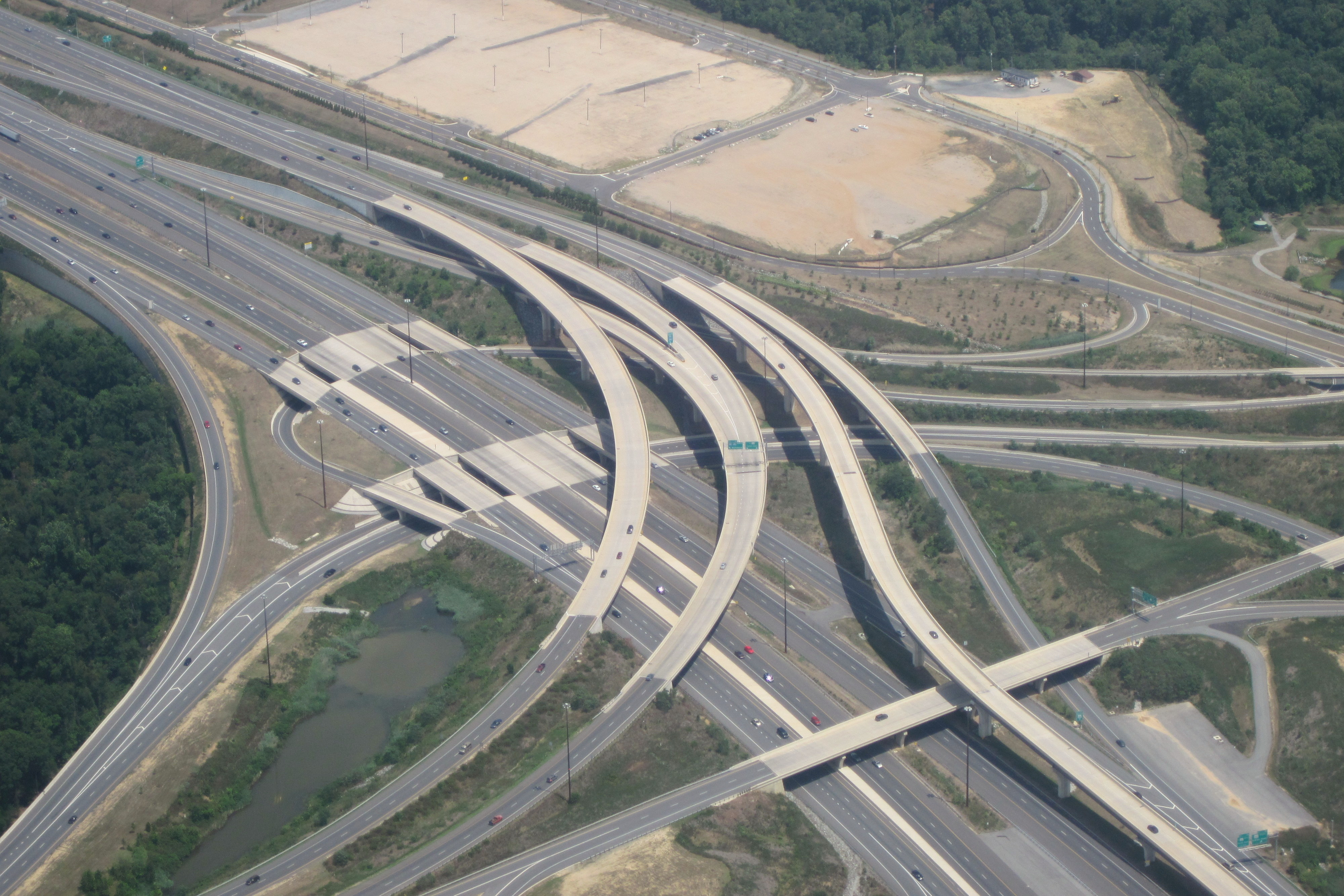
I-95/I-495 and I-295 interchange in Maryland seen from the air above the Potomac River, 2012

Heading eastward, the beltway's (I-95/I-495) local–express lane configuration ends before it interchanges with various local highways, including MD 5 and MD 4 on either side of Andrews Air Force Base, which the beltway travels near its northern edge. (Both MD 5 and MD 4 extend westward into DC and southeastward into Southern Maryland.) Past the MD 4 interchange, the beltway turns north through Glenarden, interchanging with MD 202.

The beltway then interchanges with US 50/unsigned I-595, a major highway from Downtown eastward to Annapolis and the Chesapeake Bay Bridge to the Eastern Shore of Maryland. Both US 50 and MD 450 (which interchanges with the beltway slightly northward) provide access to New Carrollton serving Washington Metro's Orange Line, MARC Train's Penn Line, and Amtrak's Northeast Corridor railroad line and the New Carrollton area.

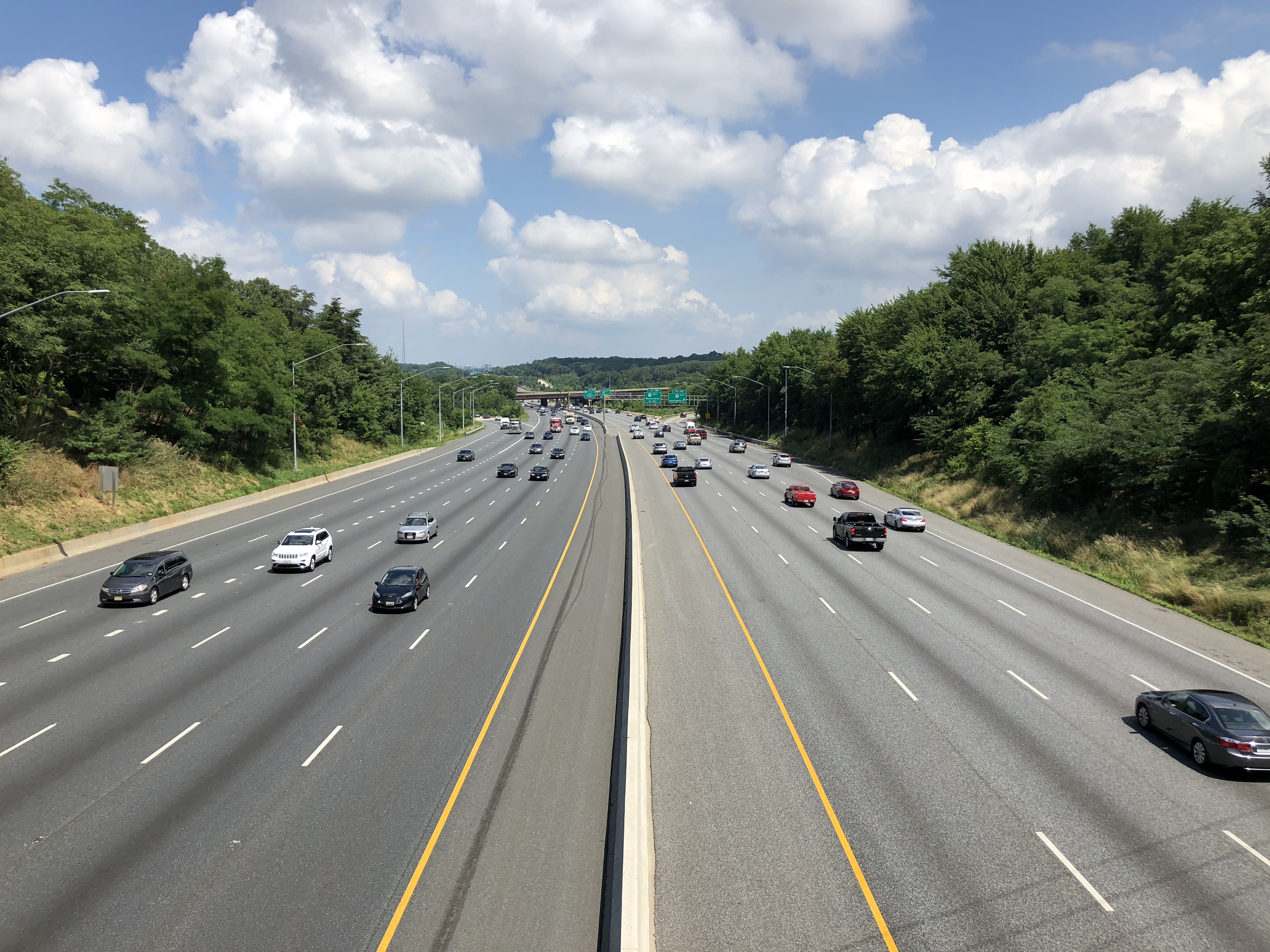
I-495/I-95 northbound approaching the I-595/US 50 interchange in Prince George's County

Turning northwest, the beltway then enters Greenbelt Park, intersecting the B–W Parkway on the northeastern edge of the park. Just after the B–W Parkway, I-95/I-495 passes an interchange with MD 201, which connects to the southern terminus of the B–W Parkway at US 50 near the DC line. Now turned fully west, the beltway runs through the northern edge of College Park, interchanging with the access roadway for Greenbelt station serving Washington Metro's Green Line and MARC Train's Camden Line in Greenbelt, then US 1.

Beyond the US 1 interchange, I-95 separates from I-495 at the College Park Interchange. I-495 continues west, alone, on the Capital Beltway, while I-95 turns northeast toward Baltimore. The interchange includes access to a park-and-ride lot, paved initially as part of I-95's route within the beltway.

==== Montgomery County ====
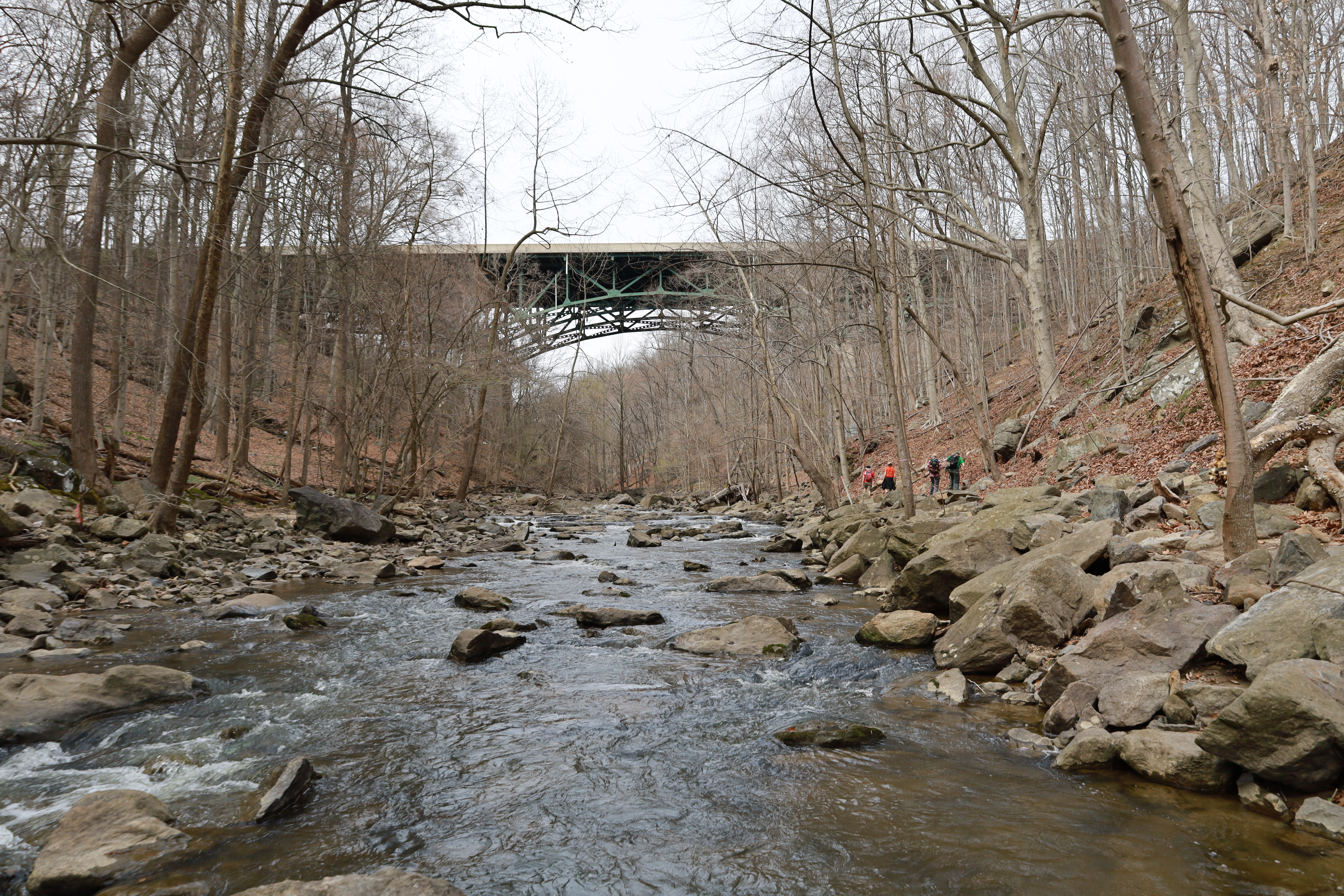
The beltway crosses the Northwest Branch Anacostia River

Continuing west from the College Park Interchange, I-495 crosses into Montgomery County, entering a heavily developed and populated area. Passing underneath MD 212 with no access, the route interchanges with MD 650 near the George Washington Cemetery. After bisecting Northwest Branch Park, the beltway interchanges with MD 193 and US 29 south of Four Corners; the two interchanges are little more than half a mile (0.80 km) apart. Southbound US 29 is the main route into downtown Silver Spring, continuing into Washington, D.C.

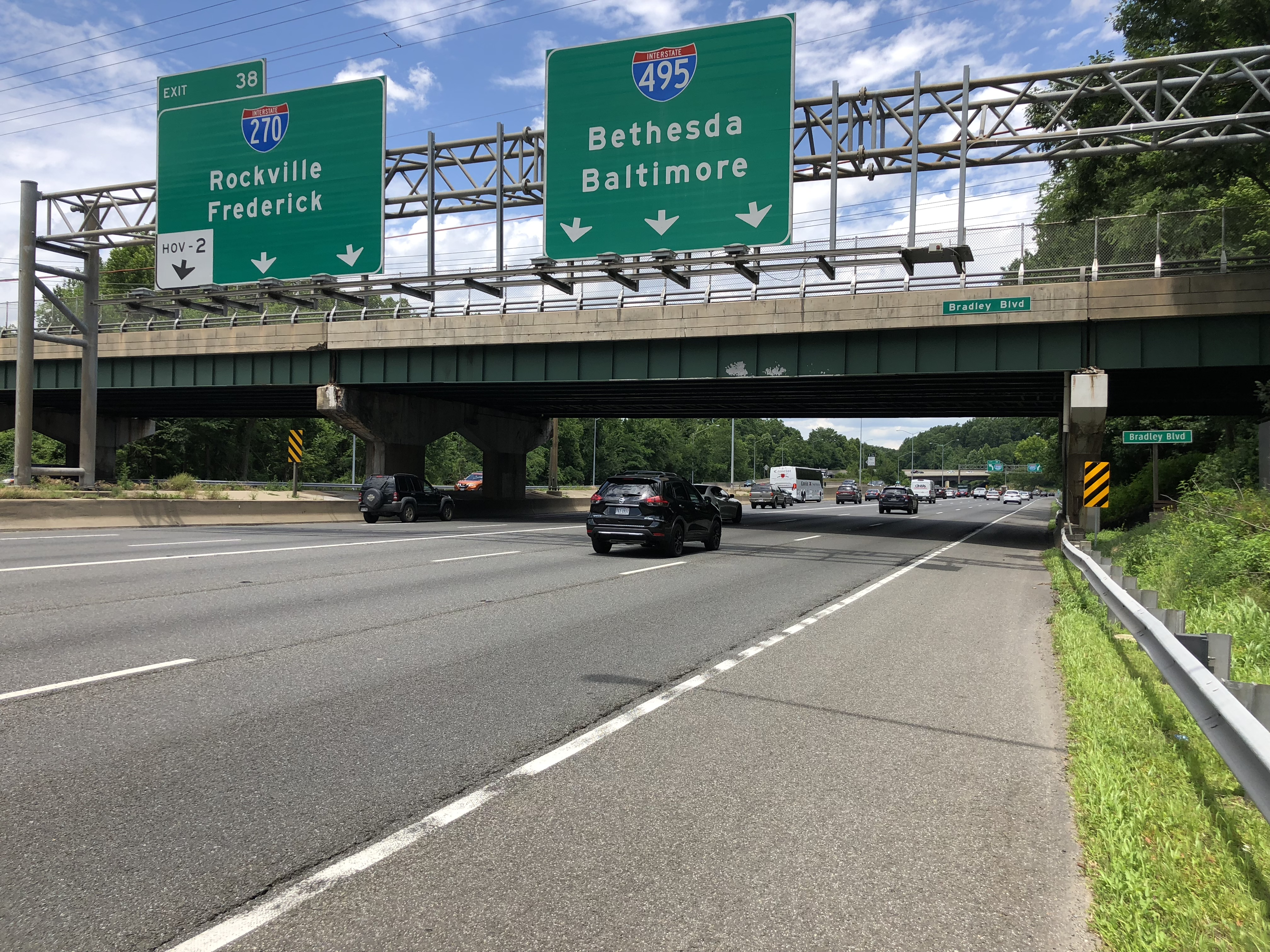
I-495 northbound approaching the exit for I-270 Spur, which provides access to I-270, in Bethesda

Squeezing past Argyle Local Park and Sligo Creek Golf Course, the beltway interchanges with MD 97 northwest of Silver Spring, then follows an alignment formerly known as Rock Creek Parkway. (Note: Not the extant parkway in Rock Creek Park within DC.) The route twists along the alignment, through and around Rock Creek Park, then interchanges with MD 185 near the Walter Reed National Military Medical Center. Turning northwest, I-495 soon encounters the southern terminus of I-270, which extends northwestward to meet I-70 in Frederick.

I-270 and I-495 split at a highly complex Y junction, with two separate high-occupancy vehicle (HOV) connections to I-270's HOV lanes and separate ramps to and from MD 355 (formerly US 240). The old Rock Creek Parkway alignment follows I-270 north, while I-495 turns west and enters the only other six-lane segment of the beltway still in existence; significant levels of traffic exit onto I-270 north, leaving the six-lane segment west of the split adequate.

Driving eastbound on I-495 from the I-270 Spur to Cedar Lane in June 2026.

I-495 outer loop where the I-270 Spur merges at the "Big Curve". I-495 is on the left, I-270 traffic is coming under the bridge.

Interchanging with Old Georgetown Road (MD 187), I-495 soon meets the I-270 Spur, the other side of the I-270/I-495 triangle. I-495 joins I-270 Spur at a converging Y junction; Inner Loop traffic exits from itself at the southern terminus of I-270 Spur, while Outer Loop traffic crosses the spur and enters it from the right. The two carriageways of I-495 temporarily widen to five lanes each until the MD 190 and Cabin John Parkway interchanges. (MD 190 provides access to the northwestern portion of Washington, D.C., and to the Potomac and Great Falls areas of Montgomery County, while the Cabin John Parkway extends to the Clara Barton Parkway along the Potomac River.)

After these interchanges, the beltway then narrows to eight lanes again. Turning sharply to the west, I-495 meets the Clara Barton Parkway along the north side of the Potomac River; this parkway provides a scenic route eastward into the western part of Washington, D.C., and westward toward the Potomac River's Great Falls. After this interchange, the Beltway soon crosses the Mather Gorge into Virginia over the 10-lane American Legion Memorial Bridge.

=== Virginia ===
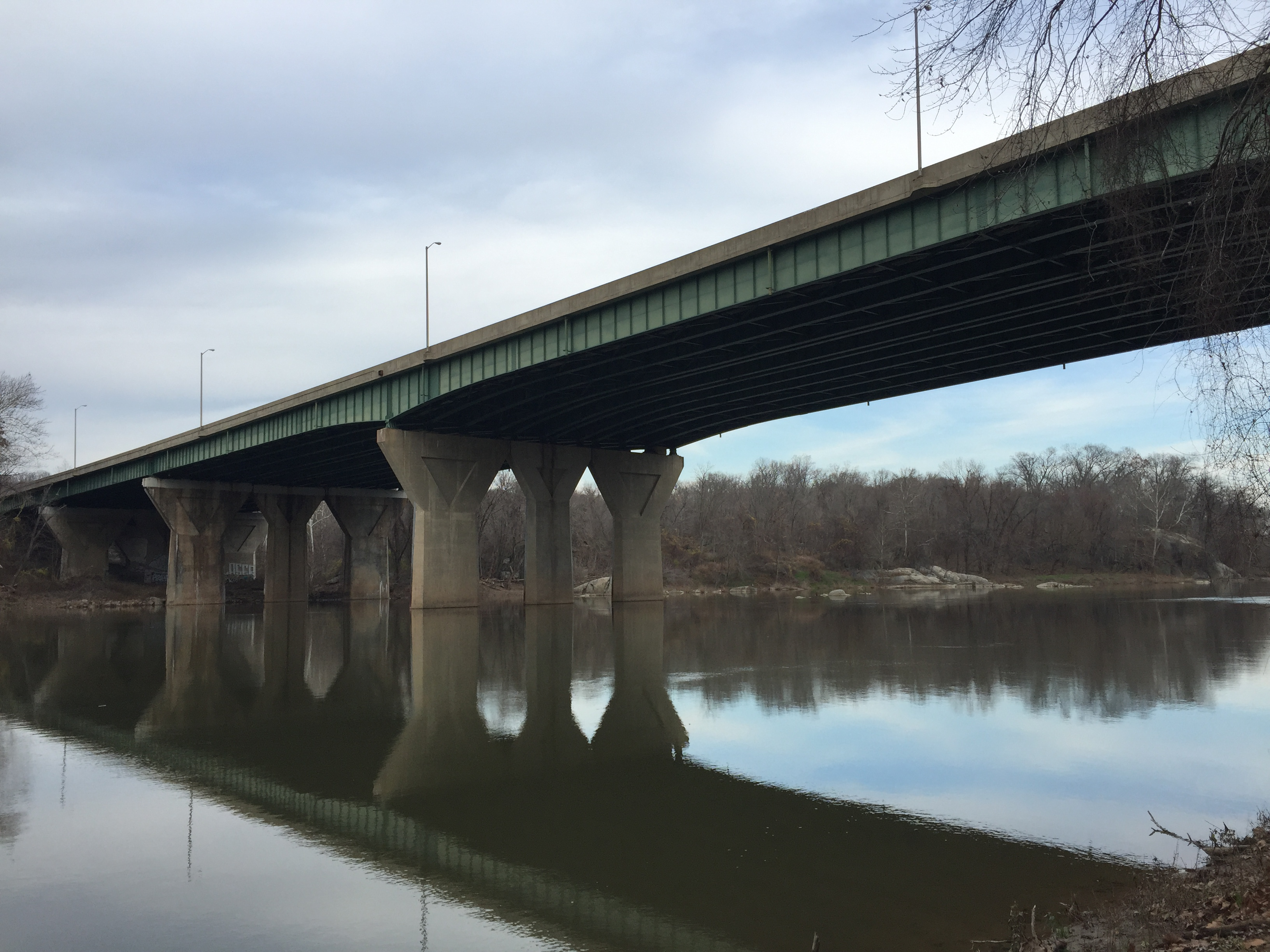
American Legion Memorial Bridge carrying the western section of the beltway over the Potomac River, 2015

Immediately after crossing into Fairfax County, I-495 encounters the western terminus of the George Washington Memorial Parkway at a trumpet interchange; the parkway provides a scenic route to Arlington and Downtown. The beltway then continues south, next interchanging with State Route 193 (SR 193) south of Dranesville District Park, then reaches the extensive triangle of interchanges between I-495, the Dulles Access Road, SR 267, and SR 123. The eastbound Dulles Access Road also provides access to I-66 for Outer Loop beltway traffic. The former interchange with the toll road (SR 267) is a directional interchange, while the latter is a cloverleaf; the entire complex occurs east of the Tysons business district.

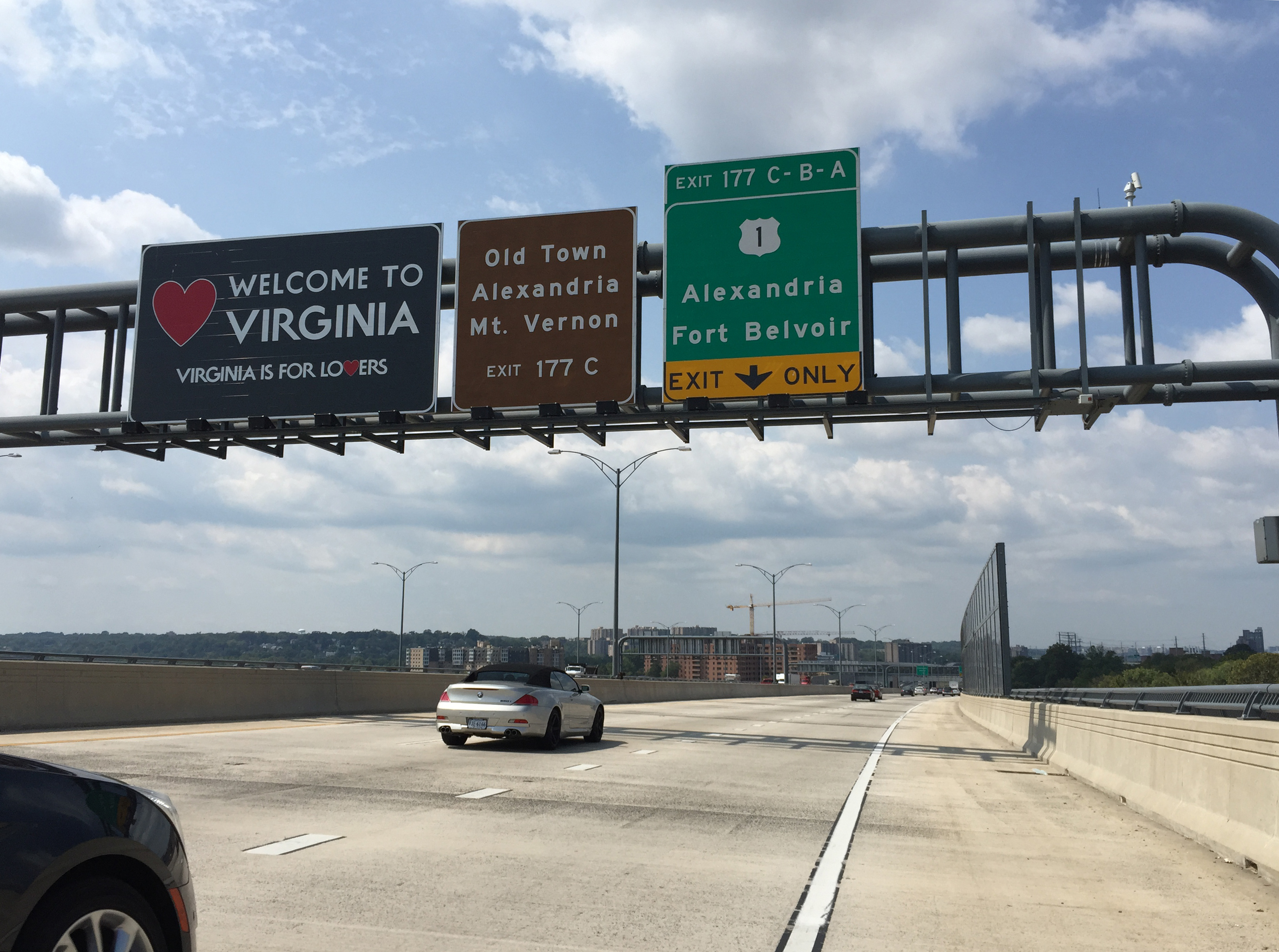
Virginia welcome sign on the Inner Loop over the Wilson Bridge. A short stretch of the bridge just before this sign is in the District of Columbia.

Now running south, the beltway interchanges with SR 7 (Leesburg Pike) east of Tysons; passing Dunn Loring to the east, I-495 soon reaches the complex interchange with I-66, which extends westward to I-81 in the Shenandoah Valley near Strasburg and eastward to Arlington and Downtown. In a similar design as the I-270/I-495 interchange, dedicated HOV connections exist between I-495 and I-66, with directional ramps providing the remaining connections. There is no access between the Outer Loop and eastbound I-66 at this interchange. Instead, Outer Loop traffic must use the eastbound Dulles Access Road exit three miles (4.8 km) to the north in order to reach I-66 east. (Note: If a driver gets onto westbound I-66 at the Leesburg Pike (SR 7) entrance, the only choice for getting to northbound I-495 is to take I-66 west to the Nutley Street exit and then get on I-66 east. A similar situation occurs for going from the Dulles Access Road at Chain Bridge Road (SR 123) to southbound I-495, where it is assumed that the driver will know to continue along SR 7 or SR 123 directly to the beltway.) There are multiple ramps from I-66 east to the Inner Loop, with one ramp exiting from the left side of I-66 east and the other exiting from the right. The Dulles Access Road leads to Dulles International Airport, which then changes over to the Dulles Greenway and ends at Leesburg.

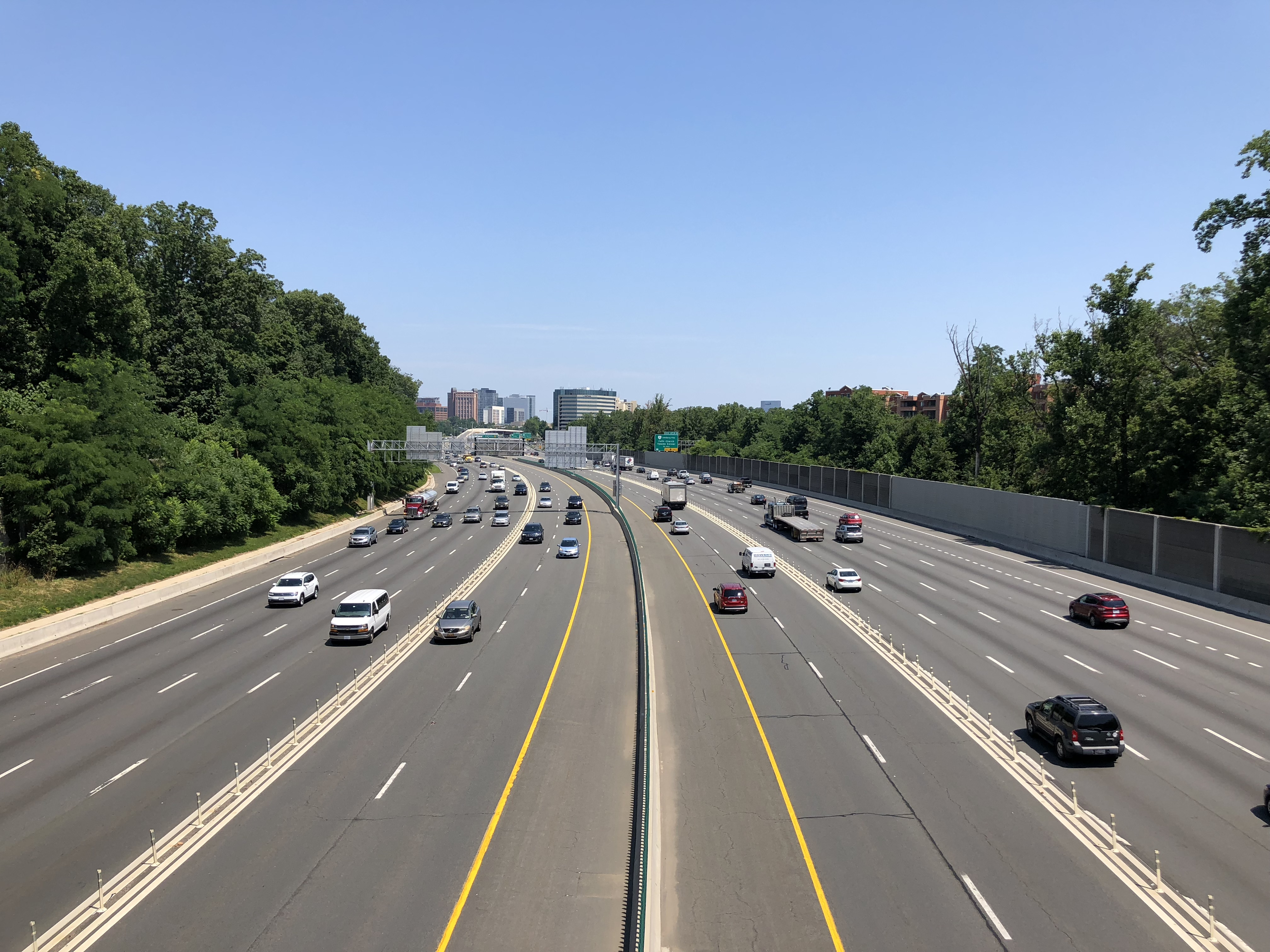
The Capital Beltway (I-495) in Fairfax County, looking north

South of the I-66 interchange, the beltway crosses under US 29 and SR 237 with no access, then encounters a large braided interchange between I-495, US 50, and two local roads; the direct interchange between I-495 and US 50 is a full cloverleaf, while the braided local interchanges between I-495, US 50, and the local roads are modified single-point urban interchanges. The entire complex is bounded on the northeast side by Fairview Lake and on the southwest side by an office complex.

Continuing due south, the route then interchanges with Gallows Road, then skirts the eastern edge of Mill Creek Park before interchanging with SR 236 southwest of Annandale Community Park. Running along the eastern edge of Wakefield Park, the Beltway turns southeast and interchanges with SR 620 before turning east near Flag Run Park and entering Springfield, meeting the Springfield Interchange with I-95 southeast of the Shirley Industrial Complex.

I-95 joins the beltway within the Springfield Interchange. I-495 also meets the southern terminus of I-395 within the same massive interchange complex.

Running due east away from the interchange, crossing to the south of Backlick Stream Valley Park, the beltway (now I-95/I-495) interchanges with SR 613 a mile (1.6 km) east of the Springfield Interchange. Continuing east, the beltway encounters a diamond interchange with a connector road linking to Eisenhower Avenue, which parallels the beltway for a short distance. Skirting the northern edges of Loftridge and Burgundy parks, the two routes enter Alexandria and soon reach SR 241, a direct route into the city. Within the interchange, the beltway nears the western approach to the Woodrow Wilson Bridge.

Continuing east, the two routes encounter US 1, a major north–south highway providing access to Alexandria, Arlington, and Downtown, as well as various points south in Fairfax County. Finally, beyond this complex interchange, I-95 and I-495 together cross Alexandria's Jones Point Park and exit Virginia via the Woodrow Wilson Bridge.

== History ==
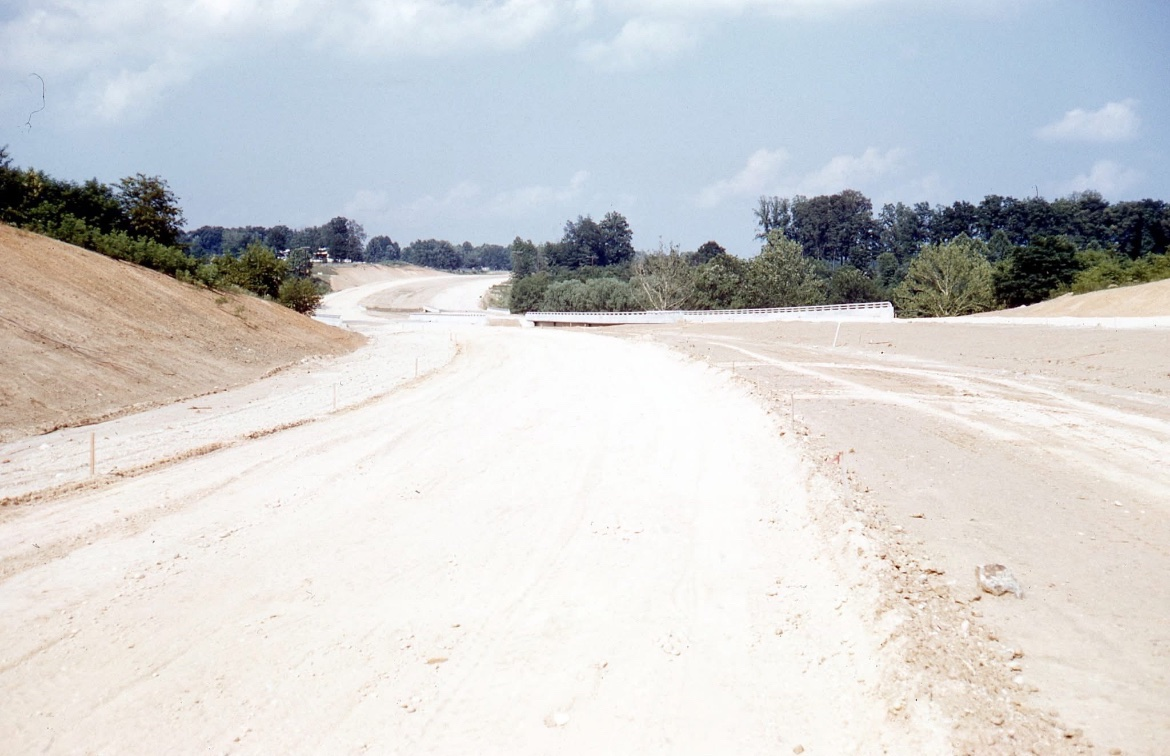
I-495 under construction in the early 1960s

The idea of building a highway around the Washington, D.C., suburbs had been discussed at least since 1944, when Fred W. Tummler, director of planning of the National Capital Park and Planning Commission, proposed an Inter-County Metropolitan Freeway. The Senate Committee on Public Works backed the idea of building the highway in 1951, asking the Bureau of Public Roads to prepare plans for the highway. Backed by Senator Francis H. Case of South Dakota, the plan called for the highway to begin in Beltsville at the nearly completed B–W Parkway, continue west through Silver Spring and Bethesda, cross the Potomac River over a new bridge, head south near Tysons Corner and Falls Church, turn east by the Shirley Memorial Highway, and end at US 1 in Gum Springs. A 1952 amendment called for continuing the highway past Alexandria, over the Potomac River on a new bridge, and reconnect to the B–W Parkway in Maryland. By December 1952, the plan had evolved into a highway that fully encircled Washington DC's suburbs. The highway was intended to reduce traffic and also to offer an alternative route for the military in case of emergency. The federal government gave final approval for the construction of the Capital Beltway (also known as the Circumferential Highway in the planning stages) on September 28, 1955. The first section of the 64-mile-long (103 km) beltway (including the Woodrow Wilson Bridge over the Potomac River) was opened on December 21, 1961; the highway was completed on August 17, 1964.

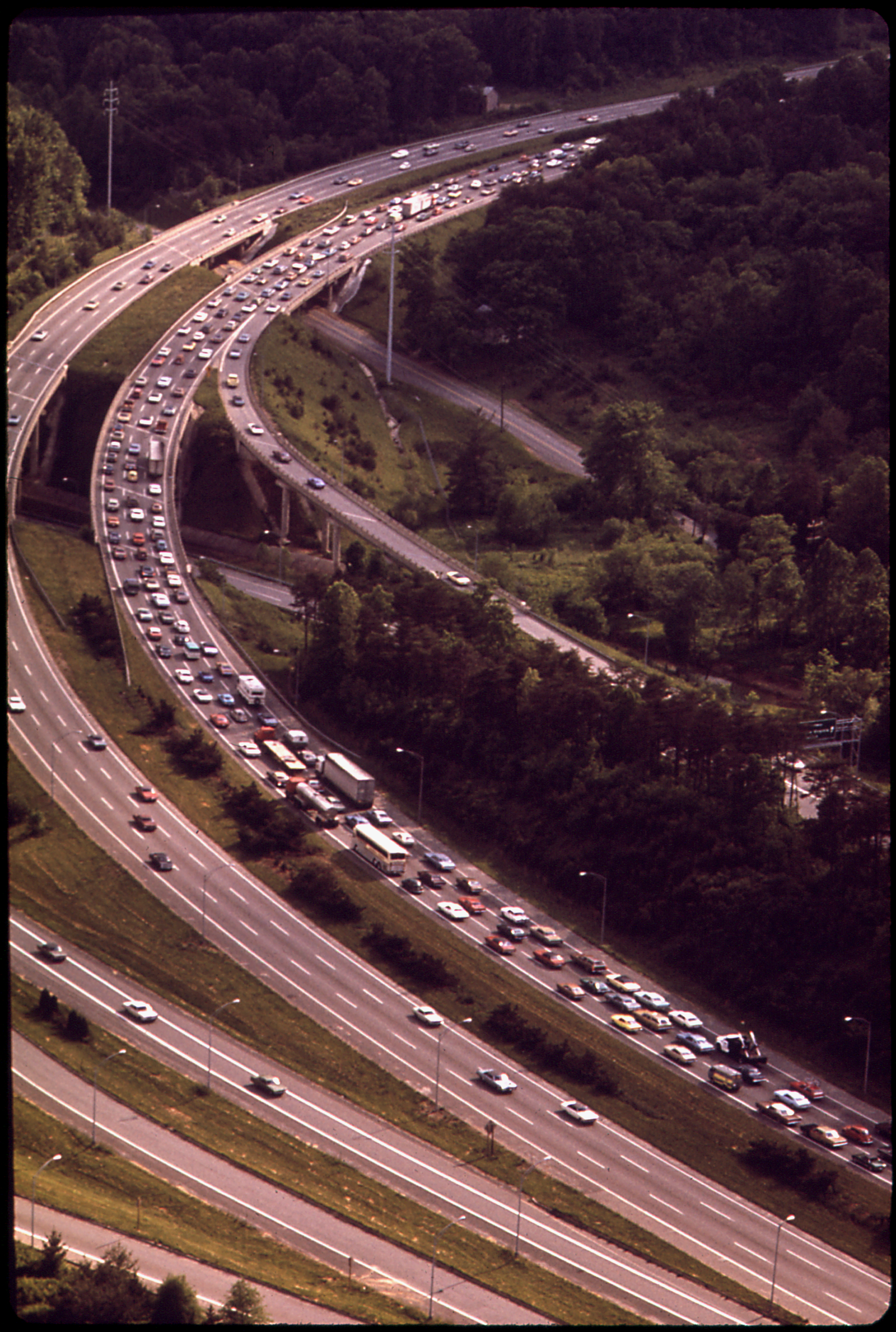
Heavy traffic on the beltway in Maryland in May 1973

Originally designated I-495, in 1977, the eastern portion of the beltway was redesignated I-95 when a proposed alignment of I-95 from New York Avenue in Washington, D.C., through Prince George's County, Maryland, to I-495 was canceled. Motorists never fully adjusted to the two halves of the beltway having different numbers. According to Ron Shaffer of The Washington Post,

There were signs stating that to continue on the Beltway, you had to get off at the next exit, when all you really had to do was keep going straight. Lots of resistance from bureaucrats, but eventually we got dual I-95/I-495 signs on the eastern half of the Beltway.

In 1989, the I-495 designation was restored to the eastern portion, making it a dual I-95/I-495.

Traveling clockwise, the beltway is designated as the "Inner Loop"; traveling counterclockwise, it is designated as the "Outer Loop". This parlance too has led to its own confusion, with unfamiliar motorists imagining two separate, distinct highway alignments, one some distance inside the other. At entrance ramps to the beltway and on the on-highway signage, "Inner Loop" and "Outer Loop" shields are posted in conjunction with the route marker shields, although the terms are not emphasized in signage.

The beltway was originally envisioned as primarily a bypass for long-distance eastern seaboard traffic to avoid driving directly through Washington, D.C. However, the explosive growth both of housing and business in the Washington, D.C., suburbs following the beltway's completion quickly made the beltway the area's "main street" for local traffic as well. Numerous large shopping malls, community colleges, sports and concert stadiums, and corporate employment centers were purposely built adjacent to the beltway, and these added greatly to the traffic, as has the passenger growth of regional airports accessed by the beltway. The formerly more affordable price of housing in Southern Maryland versus Northern Virginia, also led tens of thousands of commuters to live in Southern Maryland and commute on the beltway to Virginia. The newer Fairfax County Parkway in the 1990s helped ease some traffic on the Virginia beltway; however, various proposals to build another complete outer beltway in the outer suburbs has not gotten off the ground because local governments in Maryland object to building additional Potomac River crossings as well as destroying protected "open space" and creating sprawl.

=== College Park Interchange ===
Diagram of the College Park Interchange

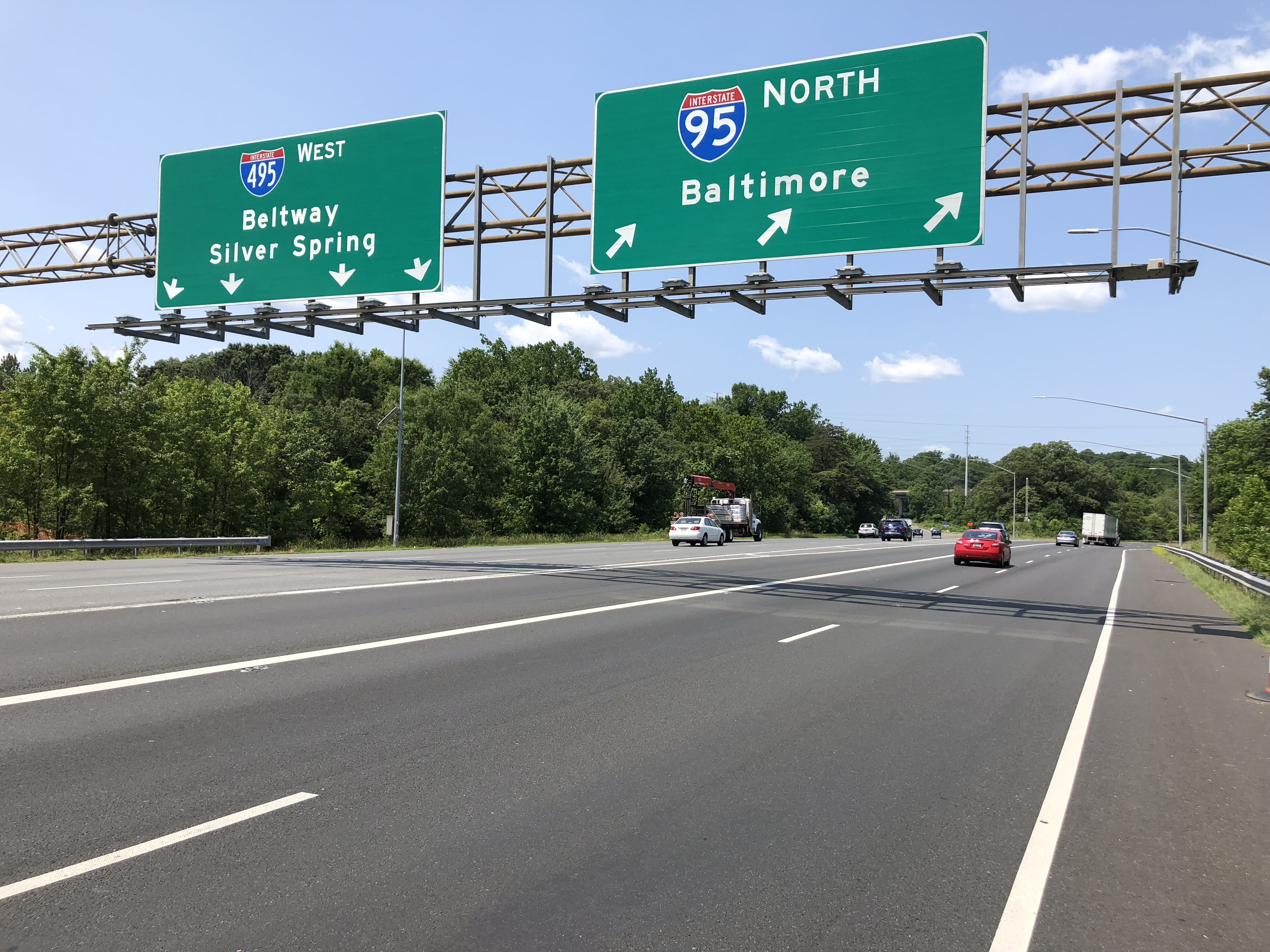
The I-95/I-495 split at College Park, Maryland

The College Park Interchange is the informal name for the northern interchange between I-95 and I-495 in College Park, Maryland. The interchange was partially opened, along with the connecting segment of I-95, in 1971, completing I-95 between the Baltimore and Capital beltways. As originally planned, it was designed with the idea that mainline I-95 through traffic would continue straight through the interchange and south into Washington, D.C., as the Northeast Freeway, joining the North Central Freeway within DC and running south toward the central business district. When the DC government canceled its segment of I-95 in 1977, I-95 was rerouted onto the eastern half of the Capital Beltway, which lost its designation as I-495 (this was restored in 1989, forming a concurrency of I-95 and I-495 on the eastern half). As a result of this rerouting, the interchange was placed under considerable pressure to cater for a traffic flow that it was not designed to handle.

Originally, travelers from southbound I-95 to the Inner Loop had to traverse the one-lane cloverleaf ramp in the southwest quadrant of the interchange; after exiting the ramp, traffic then had to weave through Inner Loop traffic headed for US 1. This unsafe condition was rectified by November 1986, when the flyover from southbound I-95 to the Inner Loop was constructed for I-95 southbound through traffic; the existing one-lane cloverleaf ramp was retained for access to the new collector–distributor lane on the Inner Loop within the US 1 interchange, to segregate through traffic from southbound I-95 and local traffic for US 1. The stump end of the interchange was also modified into its present configuration, and the park and ride was built.

=== Traffic congestion ===
Despite and because of numerous widening projects during its history (particularly in Virginia), heavy traffic on the beltway is a continuing problem. The Woodrow Wilson Bridge—where eight lanes were squeezed into six—was particularly onerous, with miles-long backups daily during commuter rush hours and on heavily traveled weekends. Relief for this bottleneck came on May 30, 2008, when the 12-lane replacement bridge opened to traffic in both directions (the six-lane span carrying Outer Loop traffic had opened in June 2006). Two of the lanes on the Wilson are being held in reserve for future use as bus rapid transit or rail transit.

Two intersections on the Capital Beltway are ranked in the top 20 on a study of the "worst bottlenecks in the nation". They are the I-495 at I-270 interchange in Montgomery County, Maryland, ranked third overall, which receives 760,425 cars daily, and the College Park Interchange in Prince George's County, Maryland, ranked 11th, with 340,125 cars. The Springfield Interchange, where I-395, I-95, and I-495 meet, was previously ranked fifth worst in the nation, but recent improvements have taken it off the top 20. Local commuters refer to the Springfield Interchange as "The Mixing Bowl", although this designation is reserved by highway officials for the even more complicated interchange complex adjacent to the Pentagon on the original Henry G. Shirley Memorial Highway (currently better-known as I-395) at SR 27 in Arlington.

In April 2005, the Virginia Department of Transportation (VDOT) signed an agreement with two private companies to build high-occupancy toll (HOT) lanes on the stretch of the beltway between Springfield and Georgetown Pike. Construction began in 2008. Maryland officials are considering such lanes on their segment of the beltway, as well as other major commuter highways in the state. Locals who disapprove of these projects have nicknamed them "Lexus Lanes" because of the potential high price for using the lanes in exchange for bypassing congestion. These new lanes are one stage of a controversial project to widen the beltway, with the second stage involving widening the beltway to 12 lanes; opponents have called for various alternatives to this project (as well as the controversial Intercounty Connector project) which would divert many vehicles off the northern beltway. The MDOT SHA's Purple Line light rail transit line, under construction as of 2022, is just one example.

The beltway has been continuously modified since it opened. The American Legion Bridge was expanded by two lanes. HOV lanes were added between River Road and the I-270 Spur in Montgomery County. The interchange between I-95 and the beltway in Prince George's County was originally designed to be a cloverleaf to allow I-95 to extend southward toward the District of Columbia. After I-95 was realigned onto the beltway, a flyover ramp was built to allow I-95 through traffic to have two high-speed lanes. The interchange between US 50 and I-95/I-495 in Prince George's County was upgraded from a simple cloverleaf to a hybrid turbine interchange. In the beltway's original configuration, I-295 and Indian Head Highway had separate interchanges. As a result, north–south traffic between I-295 and Indian Head Highway was forced to merge onto a congested section of the beltway for approximately one mile (1.6 km). As a congestion relief measure, I-295 was extended over the beltway and continued parallel to it so that the two highways were directly connected independent of the beltway. However, these interchanges were redesigned and rebuilt to accommodate the expansion of the Woodrow Wilson Bridge and the construction of dedicated ramps to National Harbor.

In January 2018, Maryland State Democratic Senator Joanne C. Benson of Prince George's County proposed legislation (Senate Bill 55) to increase the speed limit of the Maryland section of the beltway from 55 to 70 mph (89 to 113 km/h) in a bid to reduce traffic congestion on the beltway.

=== Bridge and interchange improvements ===
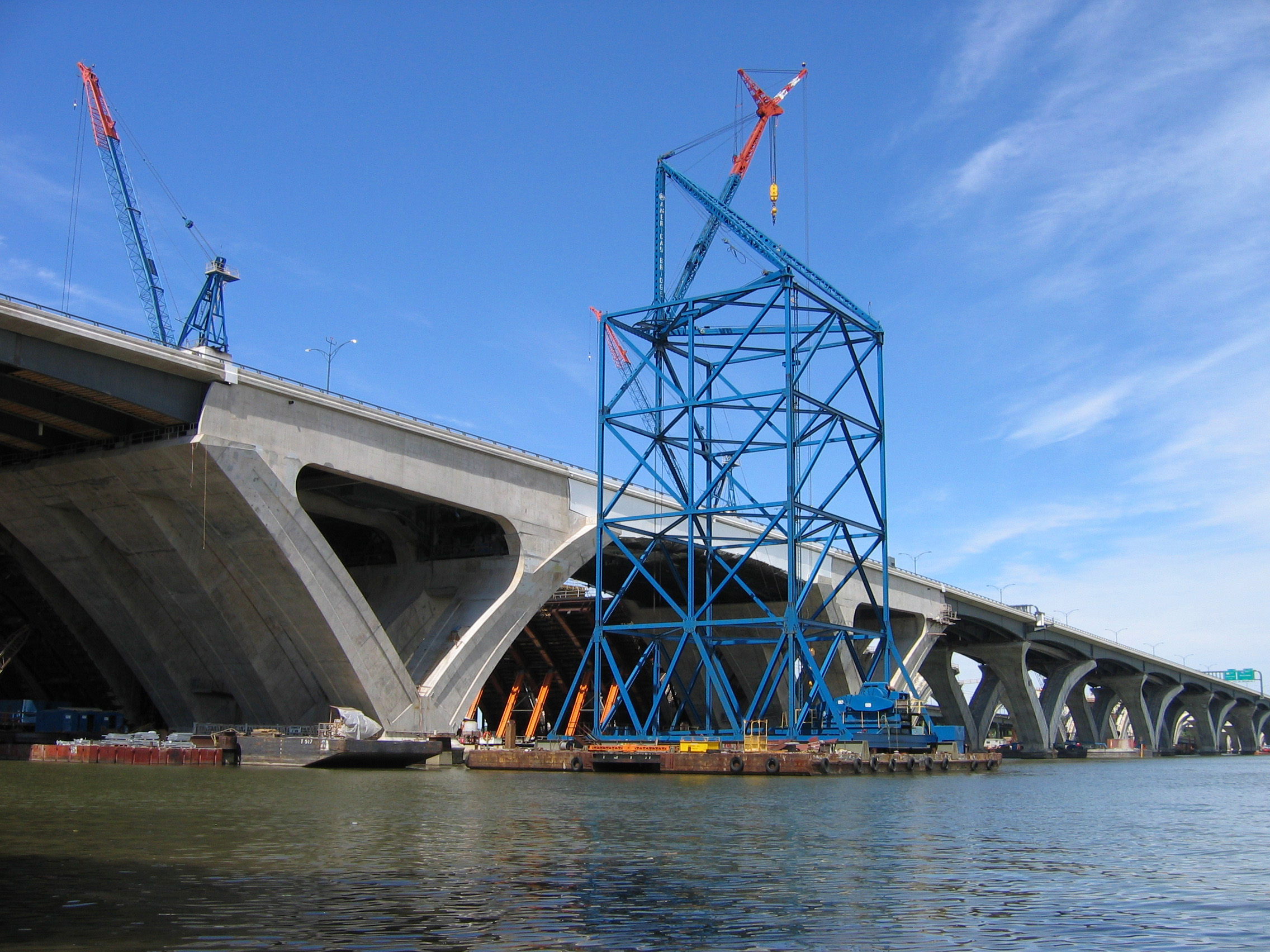
The Woodrow Wilson Bridge under reconstruction, June 2006

The Springfield Interchange in Virginia completed reconstruction in 2007. The eight-year, nearly $676-million (equivalent to $1.01 billion in 2025) project worked to eliminate weaving among local and long-distance traffic between I-95, I-395, the beltway, and SR 644.

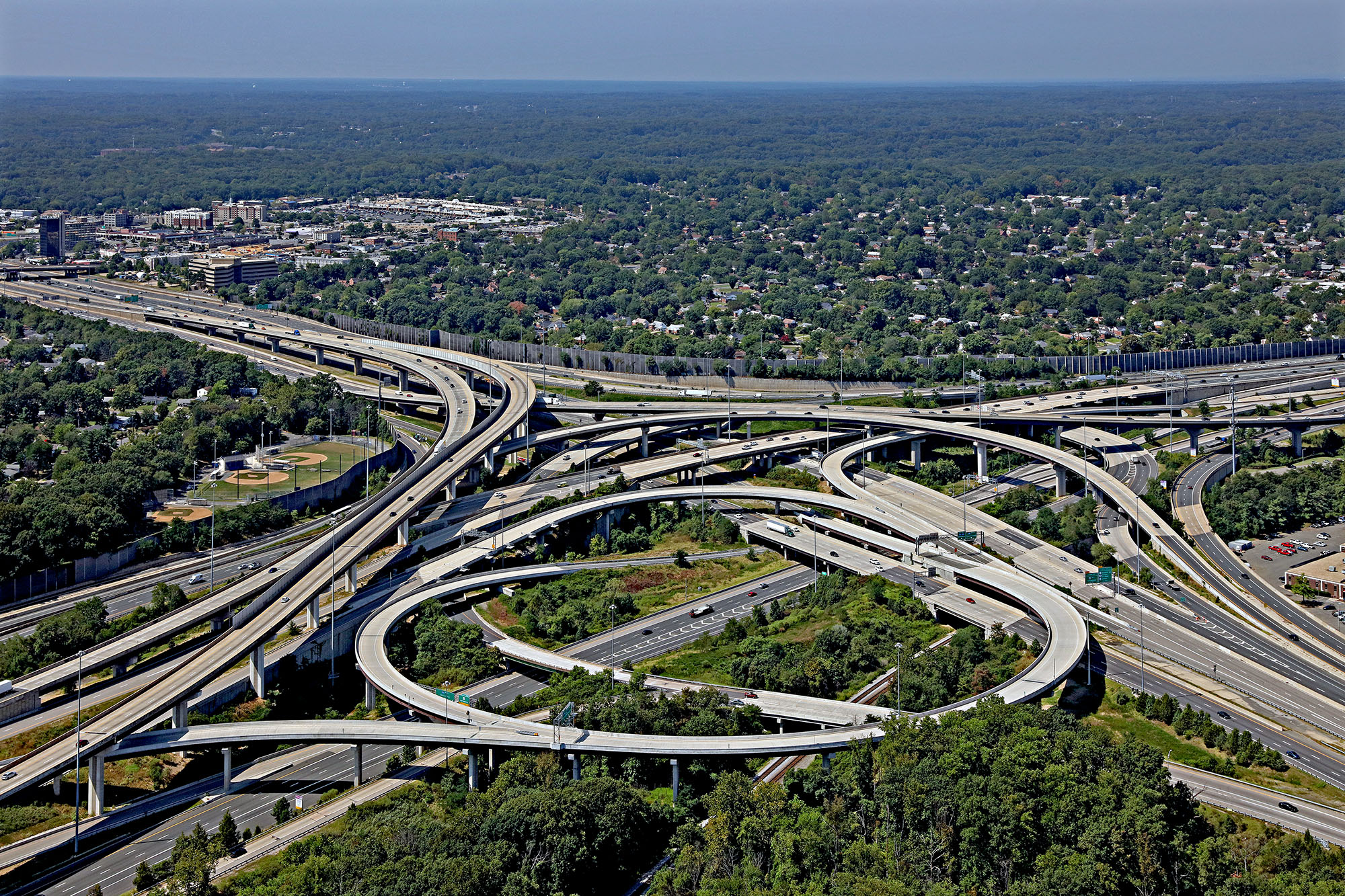
Capital Beltway, "Mixing Bowl", Springfield, Virginia, looking southwest

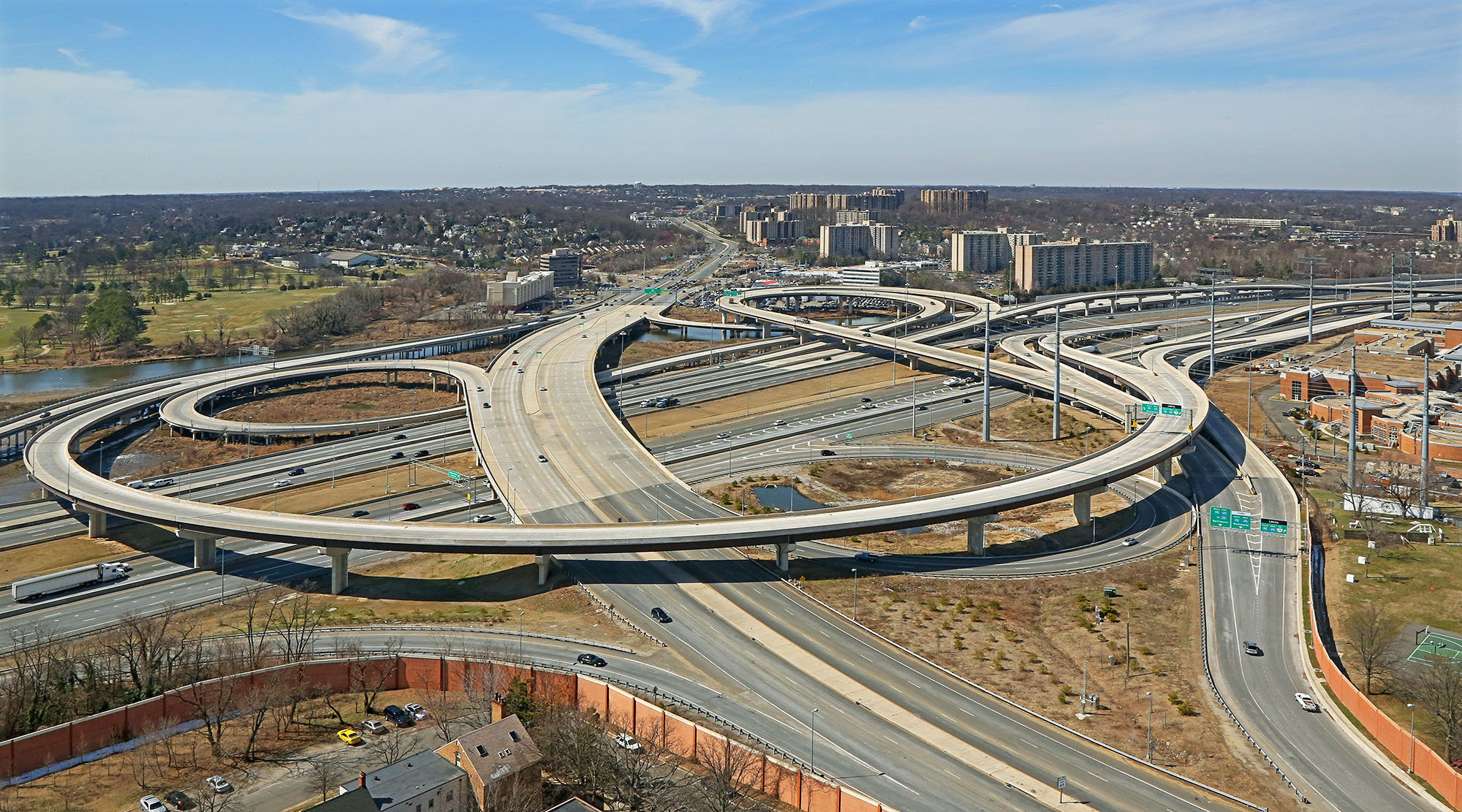
Capital Beltway/US 1 interchange, Alexandria Virginia, looking south

The Woodrow Wilson Bridge underwent reconstruction in a major project that began in 1999; it now provides express and local lanes for both the Inner and Outer loops. The new Woodrow Wilson Bridge is higher and wider than the original 1961 span, which was demolished in 2006. The Outer Loop span opened in June 2006, and the Inner Loop span opened in May 2008.

Also, in association with the Wilson Bridge project, the Telegraph Road and US 1 interchanges (exits 176 and 177) in Alexandria, Virginia, were rebuilt. The I-295 and MD 210 interchanges (exits 2 and 3) in Maryland were rebuilt as well. These improvements lasted through 2013.

The Branch Avenue (MD 5) Interchange was also improved.

=== Virginia HOT lanes ===
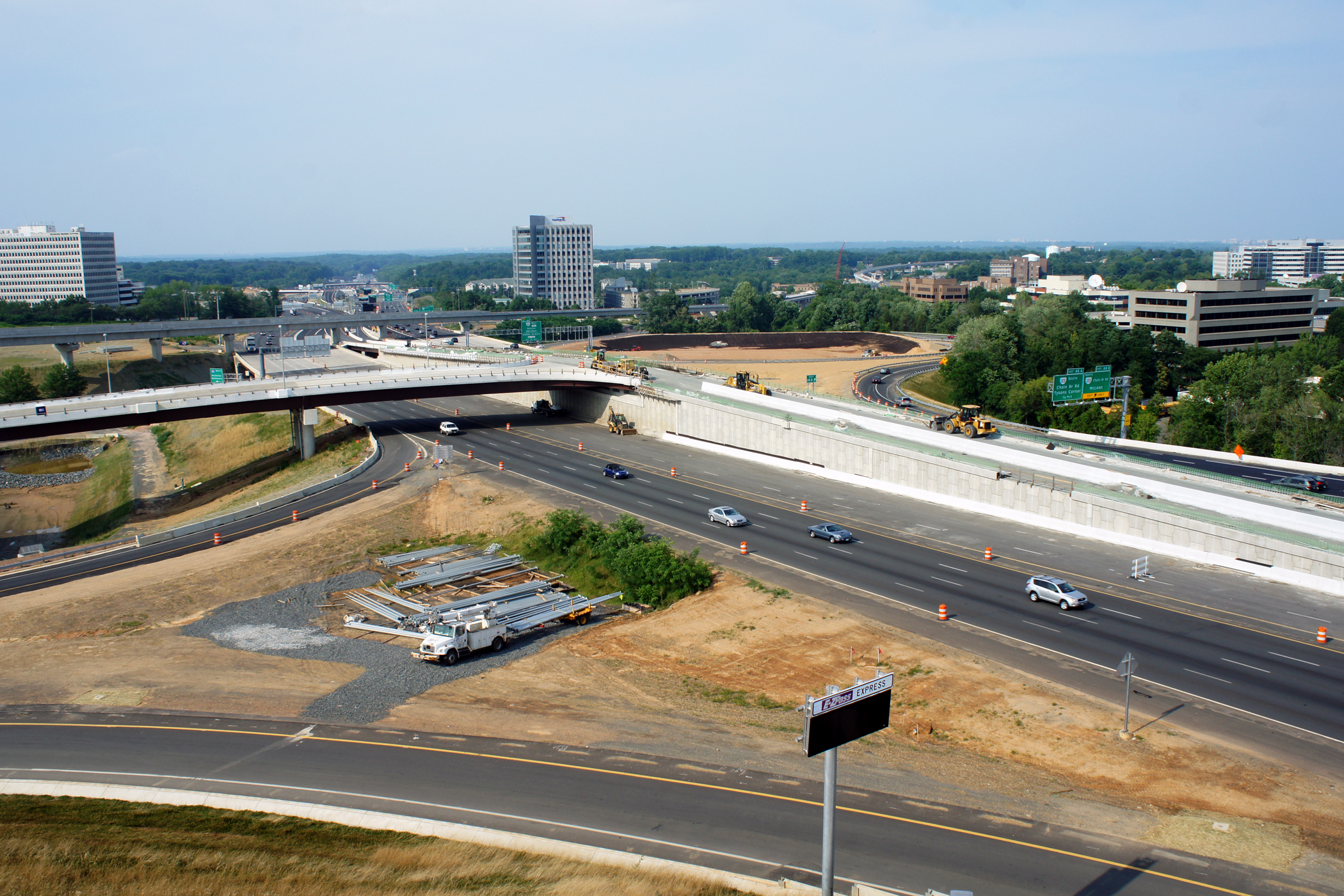
I-495 Express Lanes (HOT lanes) under construction at the I-495 interchange with SR 123 in Tysons. At the left is the elevated ramp to access the HOT lanes from SR 123 via Westpark Drive (Tysons Corner). In the background is the Silver Line viaduct.

VDOT authorized a public–private partnership to construct HOT lanes in Northern Virginia. The project added two lanes to I-495 in each direction from just west of the Springfield Interchange to just north of the Dulles Toll Road and included the replacement of more than 50 bridges, overpasses, and major interchanges.

Drivers of vehicles with fewer than three occupants are required to pay a toll to use the lanes. Tolls change dynamically, with higher tolls charged during periods of heaviest congestion. Drivers using the HOT lanes are required to carry an E-ZPass transponder to allow electronic toll collection, eliminating the need for tollbooths. Tolls are waived for buses, carpools of at least three people, motorcycles, and emergency vehicles with an E-ZPass Flex transponder set to the "HOV ON" configuration. If more than a specified number of carpools or busses use the lanes, Virginia must pay the tolls for the excess vehicles.

At the north and south terminal of the HOT lanes, motorists are able to transition directly between the HOT lanes and the I-495 general purpose lanes. However, elsewhere along the corridor, access to and from the HOT lanes is only permitted from cross roads. Some cross roads provide access to both HOT lanes and general purpose lanes; others have access only to one system or the other. Many HOT lane access points serve traffic in only one direction of I-495, which is intended to complement typical commuting patterns. HOT lane interchanges are as follows:

Access point	Direction of HOT lanes entry
Near American Legion Memorial Bridge	South (current northern terminus;)
George Washington Memorial Parkway	South
Near Old Dominion Drive	South
Dulles Toll Road (eastbound)	South
Dulles Toll Road (westbound)	North
Jones Branch Drive	North and south
Westpark Drive	North and south
Leesburg Pike	South
Interstate 66 (eastbound)	North and south
Interstate 66 (westbound)	South
Lee Highway	South
Gallows Road	North
Braddock Road	North
Springfield Interchange	North (southern terminus)

The original scope of the HOT project is covered by a fixed-price $1.3-billion (equivalent to $1.94 billion in 2025) contract between concessionaire Capital Beltway Express LLC and contractor Fluor Corporation.

In 2004, Transurban joined the Fluor Corporation team to serve as concessionaire and long-term operator of the HOT lanes. After a competitive procurement, the team was selected to deliver and operate the new HOT lanes. After a series of public meetings and environmental studies, the project was approved and funded in 2007. Construction began in mid-2008. The express lanes were opened for public access on November 17, 2012.

In March 2022, VDOT and Transurban commenced on a two and a half mile northern extension of the I-495 HOT lanes from VA 267 to just south of the American Legion Memorial Bridge (4-4 to 4-2-2-4 configuration). A new flyover is to be constructed to connect eastbound VA 267 with the northbound HOT Lanes, and an exit and entry ramp are to be constructed to enable access from the HOT lanes to the George Washington Memorial Parkway. The collector distributor lane on southbound I 495 from the parkway to VA 193 (Georgetown Pike) was reconstructed, and the underpasses at VA 267 and Scott Run, and the overpasses at Lewinsville Road, Old Dominion Drive, VA 193, and the parkway were rebuilt as well. VA 193 will be widened within the vicinity of its interchange with the Beltway. The express lanes extension opened on November 23rd, 2025 and the project itself is expected to be completed in 2026.

=== Maryland express toll lane proposal ===
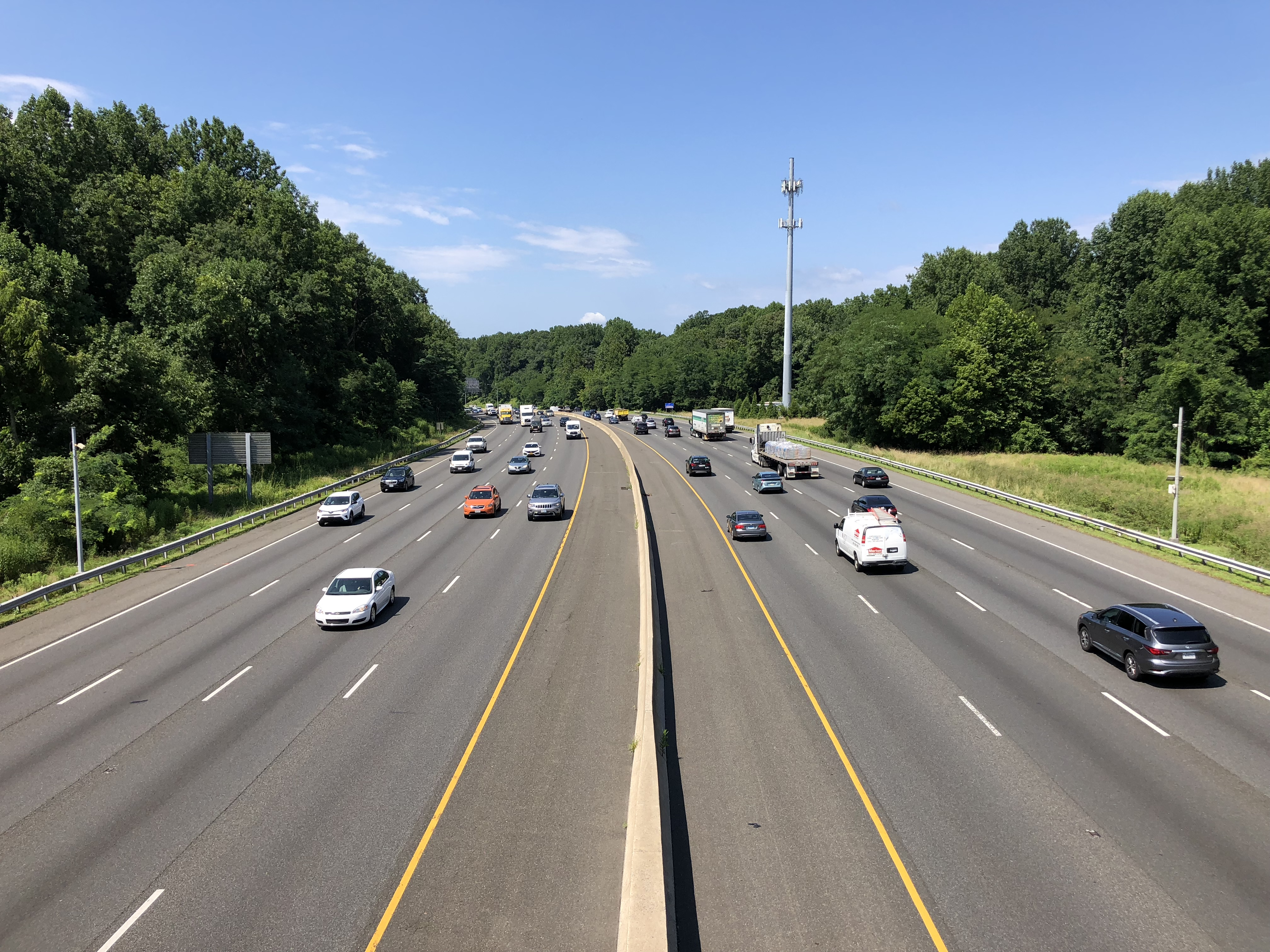
View south along I-495 near Cabin John, a primary area targeted for widening

In September 2017, Governor Larry Hogan announced a plan to widen the portion of I-495 in Maryland by four lanes, adding express toll lanes to the median, as part of an $11-billion-or-more (equivalent to $14.2 billion or more in 2025) proposal to widen roads in Maryland. The project would be a public–private partnership with private companies responsible for constructing, operating, and maintaining the lanes. On June 5, 2019, the Maryland Board of Public Works voted 2–1 in favor of the proposal to construct express toll lanes along I-495, with Governor Hogan and State Comptroller Peter Franchot voting for it and State Treasurer Nancy Kopp voting against it. The widening and addition of express toll lanes along I-495 would be split into two phases, with the first phase expanding the road in Montgomery County and the second phase expanding the road in Prince George's County. On June 12, 2019, the Maryland-National Capital Park and Planning Commission (M-NCCPC) sent a letter of nonconcurrence to MDOT SHA, triggering a mediation process with the state. The M-NCPPC has jurisdiction over parkland that MDOT SHA would need for its proposal.

In August 2022, the FHWA approved the proposed project. In October 2022, environmental and historic preservation groups filed suit against the state, citing deficiencies in the environmental review process and the projected impacts on Plummers Island. In November 2022, the Maryland Department of Transportation announced that it would not award a contract for construction of the proposed toll lane project until after Governor Hogan has left office in January 2023. Decisions on the project will be made by the administration of newly elected governor Wes Moore and the Board of Public Works.

=== Exit numbering ===
Exit numbers on the beltway have gone through several iterations. Originally, all exits on the beltway were numbered sequentially in a clockwise direction, starting with exit 1 for US 1 in Alexandria, and the last exit number being 38 for I-295 in Prince George's County. After the eastern half of the Beltway was renumbered in 1977 as I-95, exits on the Maryland portion were renumbered to the current format, counterclockwise with exit numbers assigned to mileposts. This caused problems because there were some exits that had the same number in Maryland and Virginia. Around 2000, this problem was solved by renumbering all of the Virginia exits. The exit numbers between the American Legion Memorial Bridge and the Springfield Interchange—I-495's interchange with I-395 and I-95 in Virginia—became a continuation of the Maryland exit numbers from the Woodrow Wilson Bridge to the American Legion Memorial Bridge. The exit numbers between the Springfield Interchange and the Woodrow Wilson Bridge became a continuation of the exit numbers of I-95 in Virginia; such exit numbers are much higher than those on the rest of the beltway but continue to increase in the counterclockwise direction. The counterclockwise numbering on the Capital Beltway is a rarity, as most similar loop highways, like the Baltimore Beltway, have their exit numbers/mileage set in a clockwise arrangement.

== Exit list ==
=== Mainline ===
Prior to 2000, the commonwealth of Virginia reset exit numbers at state lines and numbered them from the counterclockwise end to the clockwise end.

State	County	Location	mi	km	Old exit	New exit	Destinations	Notes
Potomac River			0.00	0.00	Woodrow Wilson Bridge (Virginia–District of Columbia–Maryland tripoint (Note: The Woodrow Wilson Bridge crosses through the District of Columbia for approximately 300 feet (91 m).))			
Maryland	Prince George's	Oxon Hill	1.73	2.78	38	2	I-295 north – Washington, National Harbor	Signed as exits 2A (National Harbor) and 2B (I-295); exits 1A-C on I-295
Maryland	Prince George's	Oxon Hill	2.77	4.46	37	3	MD 210 – Indian Head, Forest Heights	Signed as exits 3A (south) and 3B (north) eastbound
Maryland	Prince George's	Oxon Hill	2.77	4.46	37	3	MD 210 south – Forest Heights, Indian Head	Eastbound exit and westbound entrance for Thru Lanes
Maryland	Prince George's	Oxon Hill	3.50	5.63		—	I-95 south / I-495 west (Thru Lanes) I-95 Local south / I-495 Local west	East end of Thru Lanes
Maryland	Prince George's	Oxon Hill	4.33	6.97	36	4	MD 414 (St. Barnabas Road) – Oxon Hill, Marlow Heights	Signed as exits 4A (west) and 4B (east)
Maryland	Prince George's	Temple Hills	7.30	11.75	35	7	MD 5 (Branch Avenue) – Waldorf, Silver Hill	Signed as exits 7A (south) and 7B (north); access to Branch Avenue station and Metro to Nationals Park via exit 7B
Maryland	Prince George's	Morningside	9.07	14.60		9	MD 337 (Allentown Road) – Andrews AFB, Morningside	Northbound exit and southbound entrance
Maryland	Prince George's	Morningside	9.69	15.59		9	MD 337 (Suitland Parkway / Allentown Road) – Andrews AFB, Morningside	Southbound exit and northbound entrance; Suitland Parkway not signed
Maryland	Prince George's	Forestville	10.78	17.35	34	11	MD 4 (Pennsylvania Avenue) – Upper Marlboro, Washington	Signed as exits 11A (south/east) and 11B (north/west)
Maryland	Prince George's	Largo	13.14	21.15		13	Ritchie–Marlboro Road (MD 221A) – Upper Marlboro, Capitol Heights	
Maryland	Prince George's	Largo	14.78	23.79	33	15	MD 214 (Central Avenue) – Largo, Seat Pleasant	Signed as exits 15A (east) and 15B (west) southbound; access to Northwest Stadium
Maryland	Prince George's	Largo	15.83	25.48		16	Medical Center Drive (MD 202F)	Access to Northwest Stadium; formerly Arena Drive
Maryland	Prince George's	Landover	16.56	26.65	32	17	MD 202 (Landover Road) – Upper Marlboro, Bladensburg	Signed as exits 17A (south) and 17B (north) southbound; access to Northwest Stadium, Downtown Largo station, and Nationals Park via Metro
Maryland	Prince George's	Glenarden	18.54	29.84	31	19	US 50 (I-595 east) – Annapolis, Washington, New Carrollton Station	Signed as exits 19A (east) and 19B (west); exits 7A–B on US 50; access to New Carrollton Station from southbound ramp to westbound US 50; eastern terminus of Orange Line
Maryland	Prince George's	New Carrollton	19.59	31.53	30	20	MD 450 (Annapolis Road) – Lanham, Bladensburg	Signed as exits 20A (east) and 20B (west)
Maryland	Prince George's	Greenbelt	22.12	35.60	29	22	Baltimore–Washington Parkway (MD 295) – Baltimore, Washington	Signed as exits 22A (north) and 22B (south); no commercial vehicles
Maryland	Prince George's	Greenbelt	23.04	37.08	28	23	MD 201 (Kenilworth Avenue) – Bladensburg, Greenbelt	Access to MD 193, Goddard Space Flight Center, University of Maryland, Maryland Stadium, and Xfinity Center; Northbound access and commercial vehicles to Greenbelt Metro station must use this exit
Maryland	Prince George's	Greenbelt	24.25	39.03		24	Greenbelt	Southbound exit and northbound entrance; no commercial vehicles Northern terminus of the Green and Yellow lines
Maryland	Prince George's	College Park	25.19	40.54	27	25	US 1 (Baltimore Avenue) – Laurel, College Park	Signed as exits 25A (north) and 25B (south) southbound
Maryland	Prince George's	College Park	26.11	42.02	26	27	I-95 north – Baltimore	North end of concurrency with I-95; no exit number northbound
Maryland	Montgomery	Hillandale	28.14	45.29	25	28	MD 650 (New Hampshire Avenue) – White Oak, Takoma Park	Split into exits 28A (north) and 28B (south)
Maryland	Montgomery	Silver Spring	29.72	47.83	24	29	MD 193 (University Boulevard) – Wheaton, Langley Park	No eastbound exit to MD 193 west; no westbound entrance from MD 193 west
Maryland	Montgomery	Silver Spring	30.36	48.86	23B	30A	US 29 north (Colesville Road) – Columbia	Eastbound exit and westbound entrance
Maryland	Montgomery	Silver Spring	30.36	48.86	23A	30B	US 29 south (Colesville Road) – Silver Spring	Signed as exit 30 westbound
Maryland	Montgomery	Forest Glen	31.80	51.18	22	31	MD 97 (Georgia Avenue) – Silver Spring, Wheaton	Signed as exits 31A (north) and 31B (south) eastbound
Maryland	Montgomery	Chevy Chase	34.00	54.72	21	33	MD 185 (Connecticut Avenue) – Kensington, Chevy Chase	
Maryland	Montgomery	Bethesda	35.53	57.18	20	34	MD 355 (Wisconsin Avenue) – Bethesda, Rockville	
Maryland	Montgomery	Bethesda	35.72	57.49	19	35	I-270 north – Frederick	Westbound exit and eastbound entrance; south end of I-270
Maryland	Montgomery	Bethesda	36.63	58.95	18	36	MD 187 (Old Georgetown Road) – Rockville, Bethesda	
Maryland	Montgomery	Bethesda	38.32	61.67	17	38	To I-270 north – Rockville, Frederick	Eastbound exit and westbound entrance; access via I-270 Spur
Maryland	Montgomery	Bethesda	39.87	64.16	16	39	MD 190 (River Road) – Washington, Potomac	Signed as exits 39A (west) and 39B (east) northbound
Maryland	Montgomery	Bethesda	40.34	64.92	15	40	Cabin John Parkway south – Glen Echo	Southbound exit and northbound entrance; no trucks
Maryland	Montgomery	Carderock	41.72	67.14	15	41	Clara Barton Parkway – Carderock, Great Falls, Glen Echo	No southbound access to Clara Barton Parkway east; no trucks
Potomac River			42.24	67.98	American Legion Memorial Bridge; Maryland–Virginia state line			
Virginia	Fairfax	McLean	42.73	68.77	14	43	George Washington Parkway south – Washington	North end of G.W. Parkway; no commercial vehicles
Virginia	Fairfax	McLean	43.71	70.34	13	44	SR 193 (Georgetown Pike) – Langley, Great Falls	Southbound exit shares a ramp with exit 43
Virginia	Fairfax	McLean	44.51	71.63			I-495 Express south	North end of HOT Lanes
Virginia	Fairfax	Tysons	45.31	72.92	12	45A	SR 267 Toll west – Reston, Herndon, Dulles Airport	Signed as exit 45 northbound; exit 18 on SR 267; no exit number from express lanes
Virginia	Fairfax	Tysons	45.31	72.92	12	45B	SR 267 east to I-66 east – Washington	Southbound exit and northbound entrance
Virginia	Fairfax	Tysons	46.23	74.40	11	46	SR 123 (Chain Bridge Road) – Tysons, Vienna, McLean	Signed as exits 46A (south) and 46B (north)
Virginia	Fairfax	Tysons	47.16	75.90	10	47	SR 7 (Leesburg Pike) – Tysons, Falls Church	Signed as 47A (west) and 47B (east)
Virginia	Fairfax	Dunn Loring	48.98	78.83	9	49A	I-66 west – Vienna, Manassas, Front Royal	Signed as exit 49 northbound; exit 64 on I-66
Virginia	Fairfax	Dunn Loring	48.98	78.83	9	49B	I-66 east – Washington	Northbound exit and southbound entrance
Virginia	Fairfax	Dunn Loring	49.74	80.05	8	50	US 50 (Arlington Boulevard) to US 29 (Lee Highway) – Fairfax, Arlington	Signed as exits 50A (west) and 50B (east)
Virginia	Fairfax	Dunn Loring	51.08	82.21	7	51	SR 650 (Gallows Road)	Access to Inova Fairfax Hospital
Virginia	Fairfax	Annandale	52.43	84.38	6	52	SR 236 (Little River Turnpike) – Fairfax, Annandale	Signed as exits 52A (west) and 52B (east)
Virginia	Fairfax	Annandale	54.26	87.32	5	54	SR 620 (Braddock Road)	Signed as exits 54A (west) and 54B (east)
Virginia	Fairfax	Annandale	55.16	88.77			I-495 Express north	South end of HOT Lanes
Virginia	Fairfax	Springfield	57.60	92.70	4	57A	I-95 south – Richmond	Southbound exit and northbound entrance; part of Springfield Interchange; I-95 exit 170B
Virginia	Fairfax	Springfield	57.60	92.70		—	I-95 Express south / I-395 Express north	Express Lanes exit only; part of Springfield Interchange; southbound exit and northbound entrance
Virginia	Fairfax	Springfield	57.60	92.70	4	57B	I-395 north – Washington	Southbound exit and northbound entrance; part of Springfield Interchange; I-395 exit 1D
Virginia	Fairfax	Springfield	57.60	92.70	4	169	SR 644 – Springfield	Northbound exit only; part of Springfield Interchange; signed as exits 169A (east) and 169B (west); exit numbers follow I-95 numbering
Virginia	Fairfax	Springfield	57.60	92.70	4	170B	I-395 north – Washington	Northbound exit and southbound entrance; part of Springfield Interchange; I-395 exit 1C
Virginia	Fairfax	Springfield	57.60	92.70	4	—	I-95 south – Richmond	West end of concurrency with I-95; part of Springfield Interchange; westbound exit and eastbound entrance
Virginia	Fairfax	Franconia	58.82	94.66	3	173	SR 613 (Van Dorn Street) – Franconia	
Virginia	Fairfax	Rose Hill	60.02	96.59		174	Eisenhower Avenue Connector – Alexandria	
Virginia	Fairfax	Rose Hill	60.82	97.88		—	I-95 north / I-495 east (Thru Lanes) – Baltimore I-95 Local north / I-495 Local east – Alexandria	West end of Thru Lanes
Virginia	Fairfax	Huntington	62.43	100.47	2	176	SR 241 / SR 611 south (Telegraph Road / North Kings Highway) / to Eisenhower Avenue – Alexandria	Signed as exits 176A (south) and 176B (north)
Virginia	Fairfax	Huntington	63.32	101.90		—	Eisenhower Avenue	Westbound exit and eastbound entrance for Thru Lanes only
Virginia	City of Alexandria		63.62	102.39	1	177	US 1 – Alexandria, Fort Belvoir	Signed as exits 177A (south) and 177B (north); entrances include direct entrance ramps onto Thru Lanes; no access to eastbound Thru Lanes from US 1 north
Virginia	City of Alexandria		63.62	102.39	—	177C	Mount Vernon	Westbound exit only
Potomac River			64.23	103.37	Woodrow Wilson Bridge (Virginia–District of Columbia–Maryland tripoint)			
1.000 mi = 1.609 km; 1.000 km = 0.621 mi: Concurrency terminus; Electronic toll collection; Incomplete access

=== Express lanes ===
The entire route is in Fairfax County, Virginia. All exits are unnumbered.

Location	mi	km	Destinations	Notes
McLean	0.00	0.00	I-495 north – Maryland	HOT lanes feed directly into mainline
Tysons	0.60– 1.50	0.97– 2.41	SR 267 Toll west – Reston, Herndon, Dulles Airport	No northbound entrance; exit 18 on SR 267
Tysons	0.60– 1.50	0.97– 2.41	Jones Branch Road	Serves Tysons Galleria
Tysons	2.00	3.22	Westpark Drive	Serves Tysons Corner Center
Dunn Loring	3.10	4.99	SR 7 (Leesburg Pike) – Falls Church, Tysons	Northbound exit and southbound entrance
Dunn Loring	4.00– 5.00	6.44– 8.05	I-66 – Vienna, Manassas, Front Royal, Washington	No southbound access to I-66 east
Merrifield–West Falls Church line	5.40	8.69	US 29 (Lee Highway)	Northbound exit and southbound entrance
Annandale	6.40	10.30	SR 650 (Gallows Road)	Southbound exit and northbound entrance
Annandale	9.10	14.65	SR 620 (Braddock Road)	Southbound exit and northbound entrance
North Springfield	10.60	17.06	I-495 south to I-95 / I-395	HOT lanes feed directly into mainline
1.000 mi = 1.609 km; 1.000 km = 0.621 mi: Incomplete access

== See also ==
- Inner Loop, a partly built downtown loop
- Washington Outer Beltway, a planned loop outside the Beltway
  - Maryland Route 200 (the Intercounty Connector), which began construction in 2007, uses portions of what was once planned to be the Outer Beltway in Montgomery and Prince George's counties in Maryland
  - Fairfax County Parkway and Prince William Parkway, portions of which are built on rights-of-way acquired for the Outer Beltway in Virginia
