= Morningside, Maryland =

- Town
- Town of Morningside
- Flag Seal
- Nickname: "Gateway to the Nation's Capital"
- Location of Morningside, Maryland
- Coordinates: 38°49′32″N 76°53′25″W
- Country: United States of America
- State: Maryland
- County: Prince George's
- Incorporated: 1949

Area
  - Total: 0.58 sq mi (1.49 km^{2})
  - Land: 0.58 sq mi (1.49 km^{2})
  - Water: 0 sq mi (0.00 km^{2})
- Elevation: 260 ft (80 m)

Population (2020)
  - Total: 1,240
  - Density: 2,158/sq mi (833.2/km^{2})
- Time zone: UTC-5 (Eastern (EST))
  - Summer (DST): UTC-4 (EDT)
- ZIP code: 20746
- Area codes: 301, 240
- FIPS code: 24-53625
- GNIS feature ID: 0597767
- Website: https://morningsidemd.gov/

Morningside is an incorporated town in Prince George's County, Maryland, United States. Per the 2020 census, the population was 1,240. The town developed with the establishment of nearby Andrews Air Force Base and the federal Census Bureau. The government of the town is led by a mayor and town council. Morningside Elementary School and Benjamin Foulois Junior High School/Elementary/Creative and Performing Arts Academy (current) as well as Michael J Polley Neighborhood Park are located within the town limits. Morningside has one of the largest VFW posts (chapters) in the entire country. Morningside is also the city of license of one of Washington's most prominent radio stations, from the 1960s to the present, WJFK and WPGC-FM. Additionally, Morningside is home to one of the busiest volunteer fire departments in Prince George's County, Morningside VFD Station 827. In 2015, station 827 ran over 8,000 calls for service with 150 working fires in Morningside and the adjacent communities, and has garnered national recognition for their service to the community.

== Geography ==
Morningside is located at 38°49′32″N 76°53′25″W (38.825563, -76.890219).

According to the United States Census Bureau, the town has a total area of 0.56 square miles (1.45 km^{2}), all land.

== Adjacent areas ==
- Joint Base Andrews (southeast)
- Forestville (northwest)
- Camp Springs (southwest)
- District Heights (north)

== Demographics ==
Historical population
Census	Pop.	Note	%±
1950	1,520		—
1960	1,708		12.4%
1970	1,659		−2.9%
1980	1,395		−15.9%
1990	930		−33.3%
2000	1,295		39.2%
2010	2,015		55.6%
2020	1,240		−38.5%
U.S. Decennial Census; 2010 2020

=== Racial and ethnic composition ===
Morningside town, Maryland – Racial and ethnic composition Note: the US Census treats Hispanic/Latino as an ethnic category. This table excludes Latinos from the racial categories and assigns them to a separate category. Hispanics/Latinos may be of any race.
Race / Ethnicity (NH = Non-Hispanic)	Pop 2000	Pop 2010	Pop 2020	% 2000	% 2010	% 2020
White alone (NH)	532	350	210	41.08%	17.37%	16.94%
Black or African American alone (NH)	652	1,346	602	50.35%	66.80%	48.55%
Native American or Alaska Native alone (NH)	4	6	5	0.31%	0.30%	0.40%
Asian alone (NH)	27	79	13	2.08%	3.92%	1.05%
Native Hawaiian or Pacific Islander alone (NH)	0	2	3	0.00%	0.10%	0.24%
Other race alone (NH)	0	11	6	0.00%	0.55%	0.48%
Mixed race or Multiracial (NH)	40	47	53	3.09%	2.33%	4.27%
Hispanic or Latino (any race)	40	174	348	3.09%	8.64%	28.06%
Total	1,295	2,015	1,240	100.00%	100.00%	100.00%

=== 2010 census ===
As of the census of 2010, there were 2,015 people, 851 households, and 465 families living in the town. The population density was 3,598.2 inhabitants per square mile (1,389.3/km^{2}). There were 922 housing units at an average density of 1,646.4 per square mile (635.7/km^{2}). The racial makeup of the town was 20.6% White, 67.3% African American, 0.3% Native American, 3.9% Asian, 0.1% Pacific Islander, 4.9% from other races, and 2.8% from two or more races. Hispanic or Latino of any race were 8.6% of the population.

There were 851 households, of which 29.4% had children under the age of 18 living with them, 30.3% were married couples living together, 18.6% had a female householder with no husband present, 5.8% had a male householder with no wife present, and 45.4% were non-families. 36.4% of all households were made up of individuals, and 4.7% had someone living alone who was 65 years of age or older. The average household size was 2.37 and the average family size was 3.15.

The median age in the town was 34.6 years. 22.2% of residents were under the age of 18; 8.8% were between the ages of 18 and 24; 36.8% were from 25 to 44; 24.6% were from 45 to 64; and 7.7% were 65 years of age or older. The gender makeup of the town was 46.2% male and 53.8% female.

=== 2000 census ===
As of the census of 2000, there were 2,386 people, 459 households, and 335 families living in the town. The population density was 2,251.8 inhabitants per square mile (869.4/km^{2}). There were 494 housing units at an average density of 859.0 per square mile (331.7/km^{2}). The racial makeup of the town was 42.55% White, 51.27% African American, 0.31% Native American, 2.08% Asian, 0.62% from other races, and 3.17% from two or more races. Hispanic or Latino of any race were 3.09% of the population.

There were 459 households, out of which 27.5% had children under the age of 18 living with them, 48.8% were married couples living together, 18.3% had a female householder with no husband present, and 26.8% were non-families. 20.7% of all households were made up of individuals, and 9.8% had someone living alone who was 65 years of age or older. The average household size was 2.82 and the average family size was 3.27.

In the town, the population was spread out, with 24.9% under the age of 18, 7.3% from 18 to 24, 28.0% from 25 to 44, 27.6% from 45 to 64, and 12.3% who were 65 years of age or older. The median age was 39 years. For every 100 females, there were 93.0 males. For every 100 females age 18 and over, there were 93.1 males.

The median income for a household in the town was $56,429, and the median income for a family was $61,364. Males had a median income of $38,958 versus $35,694 for females. The per capita income for the town was $22,333. About 3.3% of families and 6.4% of the population were below the poverty line, including 9.6% of those under age 18 and 2.7% of those age 65 or over.

== Government ==
Prince George's County Police Department District 4 Station in Glassmanor CDP, with an Oxon Hill postal address, serves the community.

The town maintains a police department and public works department.

== Education ==
Residents are zoned to Prince George's County Public Schools (PGCPS):

- William Beanes Elementary School
- Drew-Freeman Middle School
- Dr. Henry A. Wise, Jr. High School

It was formerly served by PGCPS Morningside Elementary, which opened in 1956 was in the town limits. The school, which had a capacity of 300 students, closed in 2009. At the end of its life it was one of the few PGCPS schools in which significant numbers of students traveled to school on foot. A report made by a non-PGCPS authority generated around 2009 stated that the condition of Morningside Elementary's building was one of the poorest of any school in Prince George's County. By 2011 Imagine Schools was scheduled to open a campus in the former Morningside Elementary, now known as Imagine Foundations at Morningside Public Charter School, which serves grades PK-8.

== Transportation ==
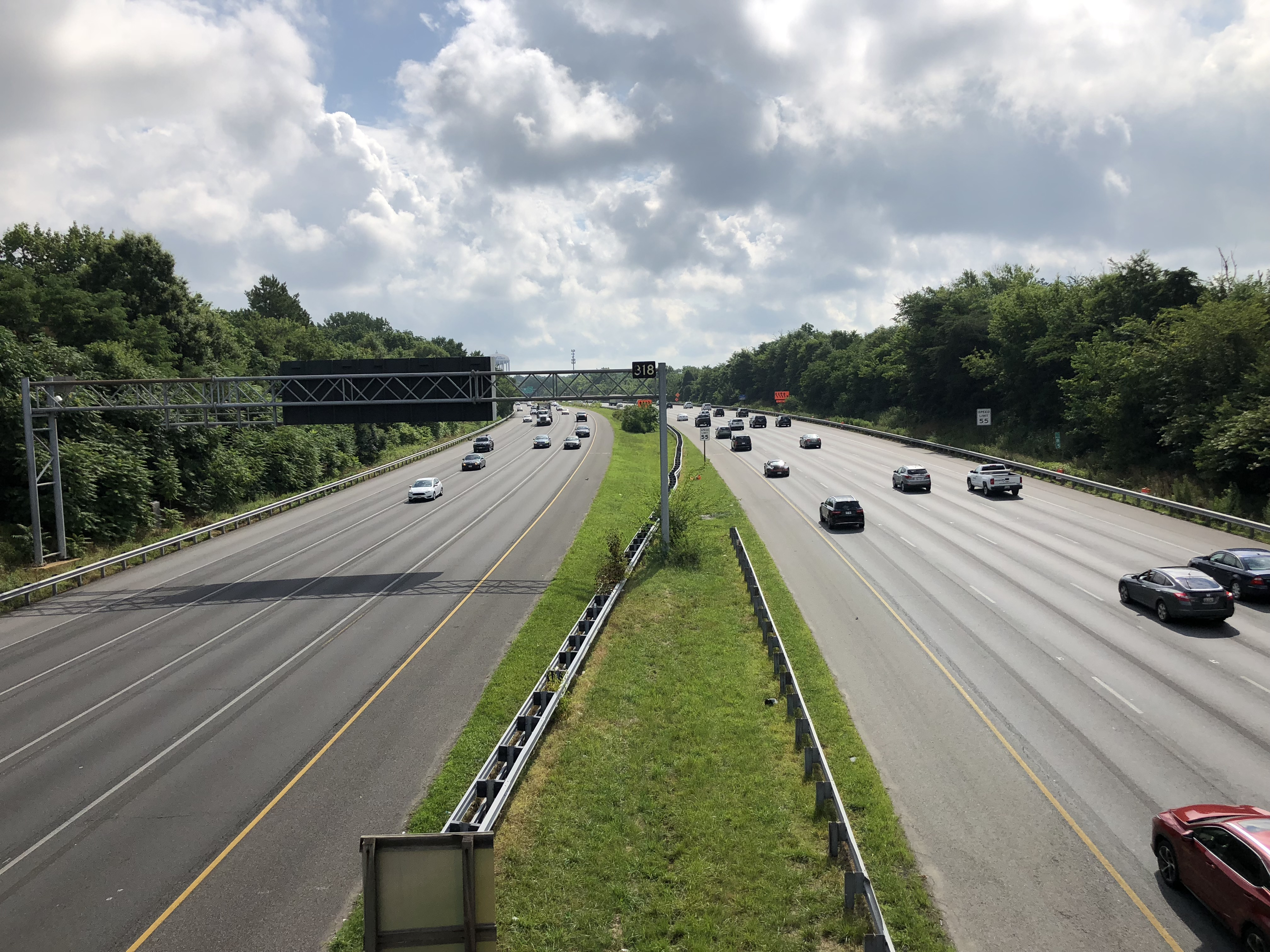
I-95/I-495 northbound in Morningside

The largest highway serving Morningside is the Capital Beltway (Interstate 495) and Interstate 95). I-95 is the major highway along the East Coast of the United States, serving many major cities, while I-495 encircles Washington, D.C.

== Notable people ==
- Gerald Glaubitz, former Mayor
- Karen Rooker, Former Mayor
- Kenneth C Wade, Former Mayor
- Bennard J. Cann, Former Mayor
- Bradley Wade, Mayor
