= DeButts =

DeButts, sometimes spelt as deButts or De Butts, is a surname. Notable people with the surname include:

- Augustus De Butts (1770–1853), British Royal Engineer officer
- Elisha De Butts (1773–1831), American physician
- John D. deButts (1915–1986), American businessman
- Harry A. deButts (d. 1983), American businessman
- Henry De Butts, United States Army captain
- Samuel DeButts, American physician
- Freddie De Butts, British Brigadier and diplomat
