= Witness tree =

Trees present during historically significant events

Cherry blossoms from the Tidal Basin area in Washington DC

A witness tree is a tree that was present during a major historical or cultural event of the United States. The trees got their name from being able to "witness" a historically significant event. Witness trees are centuries old, and are of great importance to the nation's history. It is unclear how many witness trees there are, but the ones documented are archived in the Library of Congress through the Witness Tree Protection Program.

== Witness Tree Protection Program ==
Because of their historical importance, the Historic American Landscape Survey, under the Heritage Documentation Program, created the Witness Tree Protection Program in 2006. The program was initially created to document and identify two dozen historically significant trees in the Washington, D.C. area. The creation of the program came from the discovery of Yoshino cherry trees from the year 1910. In 1910, the people of Japan had gifted the United States Yoshino cherry trees as a sign of friendship. The trees gifted in 1910 were all issued to be destroyed after the U.S. Department of Agriculture had determined they were diseased and filled with insects. In the year 1912, Japan had replaced the original trees with a new set of Yoshino cherry trees. USDA records show that two dozen of the trees from 1910 were saved and quarantined for observation by a team of scientists, headed by entomologist Charles Marlatt. The cherry trees are believed to have been planted near Hains Point on what is now part of the East Potomac Golf Course. The trees found on the golf course show signs of being intentionally planted in rows as a method of quarantine, and evidence such as their age and DNA analysis show that they are very likely to not be the Yoshino cherry trees gifted in 1912.

== List of witness trees ==
=== The Olmsted Elm ===
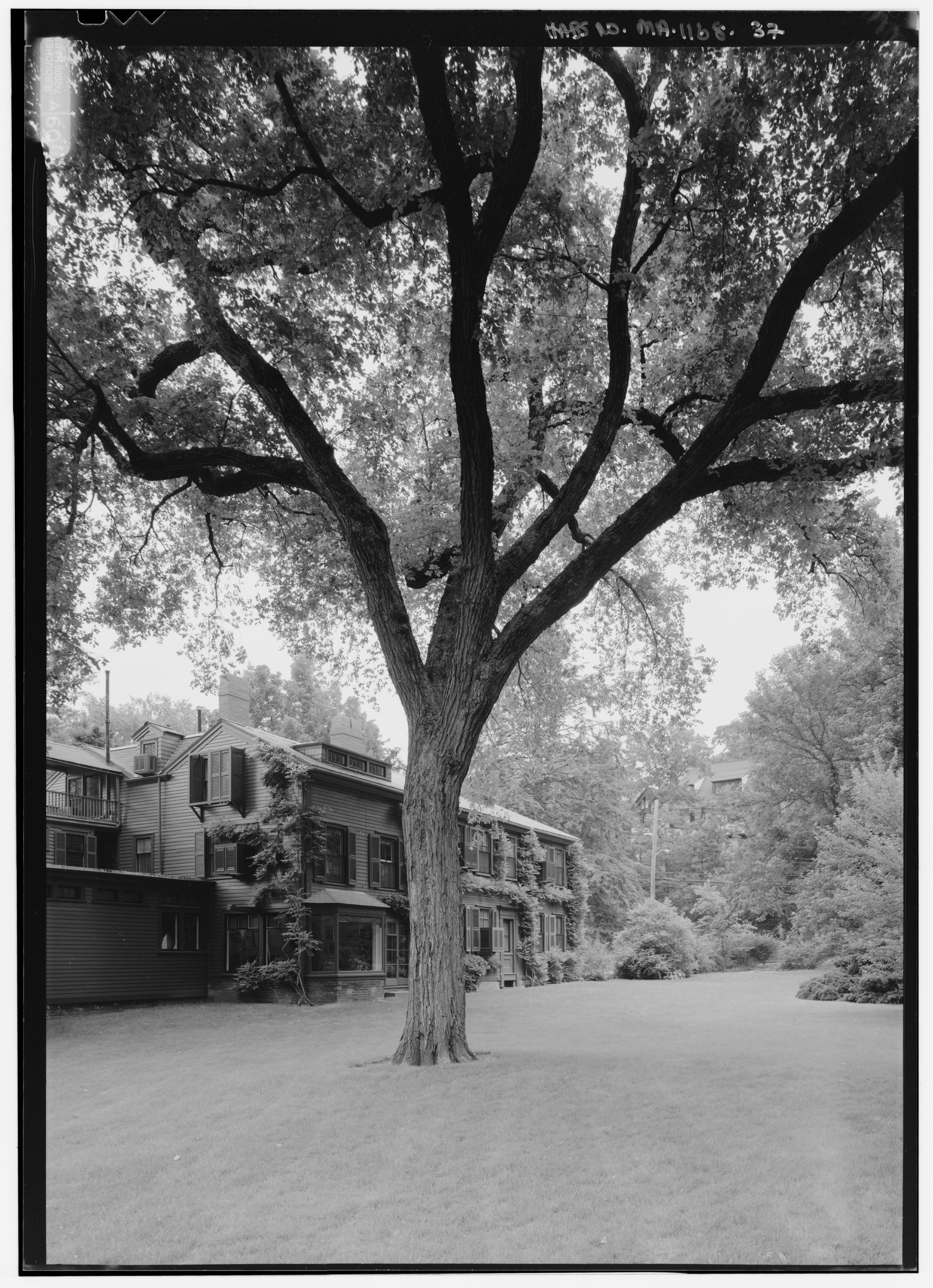
The Olmsted Elm

The Olmsted Elm located on the Frederick Law Olmsted National Historic Site in Brookline, Massachusetts, was planted around the year 1810. The elm was present when Frederick Law Olmsted bought the property in 1883, which he called "Fairsted". Olmsted and his son, John Charles Olmsted, had removed all the other trees left by an Orchard in the vicinity but decided to keep the elm. The elm was kept on by the National Park Service as an important feature of the South Lawn until it succumbed to Dutch elm disease, and was removed on March 30, 2011. The elm was replaced with a new, disease-resistant variety, a Jefferson Elm, in 2013.

=== Jefferson Elm ===
333 American elms were planted north of the Smithsonian Freer Gallery on the National Mall in 1935. Most of the elms have perished and been replaced except for the Jefferson Elm. The Jefferson Elm's leaves remain green through late October, indicating genetically unique specimens. Many experiments were done on the Jefferson Elm from 1980 to the early 1990s. The experiment's results showed resistance to Dutch elm disease, which is believed to have come from a unique genetic arrangement. The elm also has a unique U-shaped branch junction that provides it more stability.

=== Andrew Jackson Southern Magnolia ===
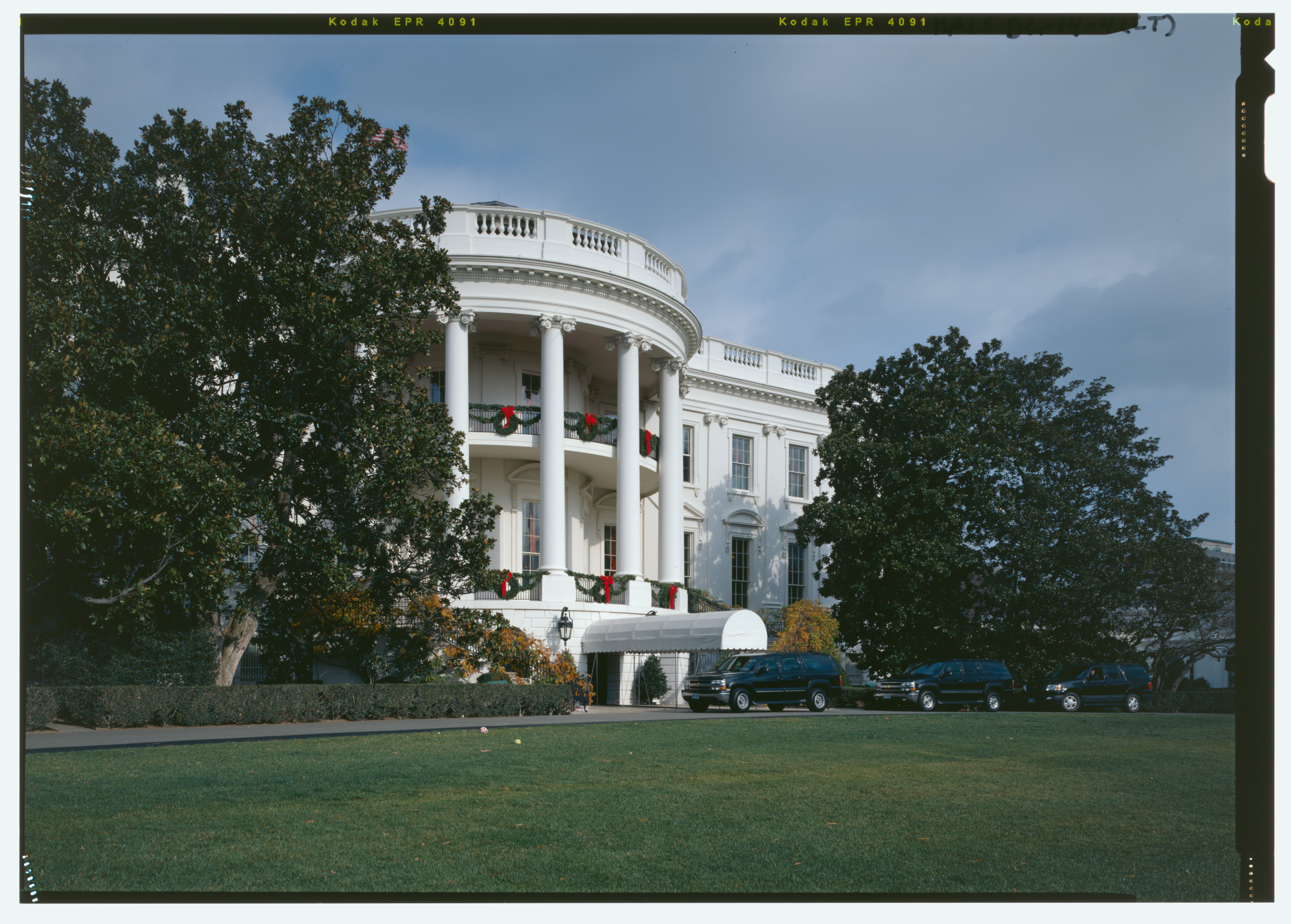
Andrew Jackson Southern Magnolia

In 1829 President Andrew Jackson planted his late wife's favorite magnolia trees, the Jackson Magnolia, in her memory. The trees can be found on both sides of the south portico of the White House. These magnolia trees are the oldest presidentially planted on the White House grounds and they are also depicted on the U.S. twenty dollar bill.

This tree was felled in April 2025 due to its dire condition as a result of its age; it had previously suffered damage in 1994, and underwent a trimming operation in 2017. Subsequently, President Donald Trump planted a new tree in its place.

=== War of 1812 Willow Oak ===
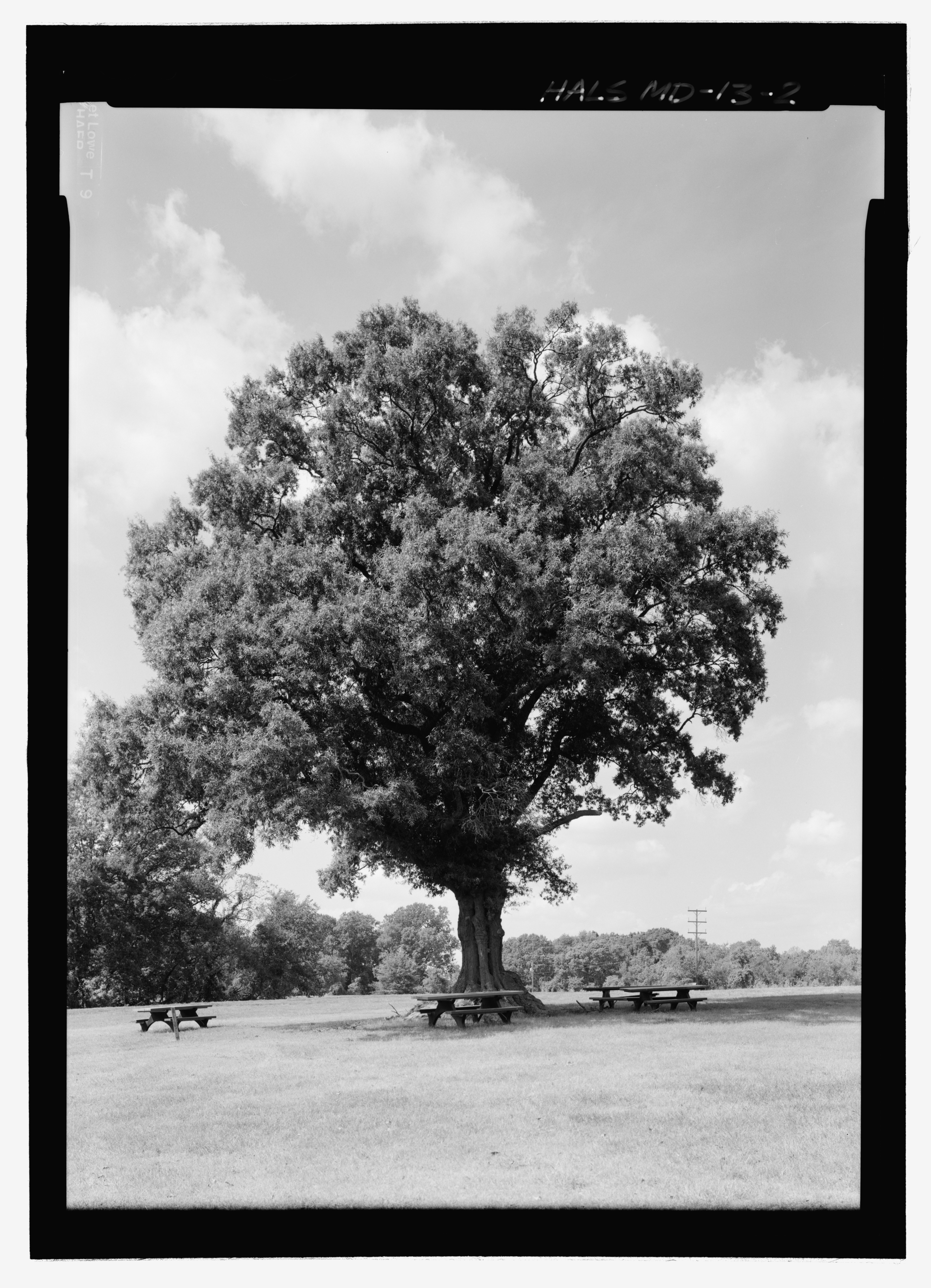
War of 1812 Willow Oak

Located in Maryland, the oak sits on the former site of the Mount Welby House. The house that was home to British sympathizers Samuel DeButts and his family. Today the tree is near the parking lot for the Oxon Cove Park and Oxon Hill Farm in Oxon Hill. The oak witnessed the Battle of Bladensburg on 24 August 1814. The oak is believed to be at least 200 years old, which is past the average life expectancy of a Willow Oak.

=== The Burnside Sycamore ===
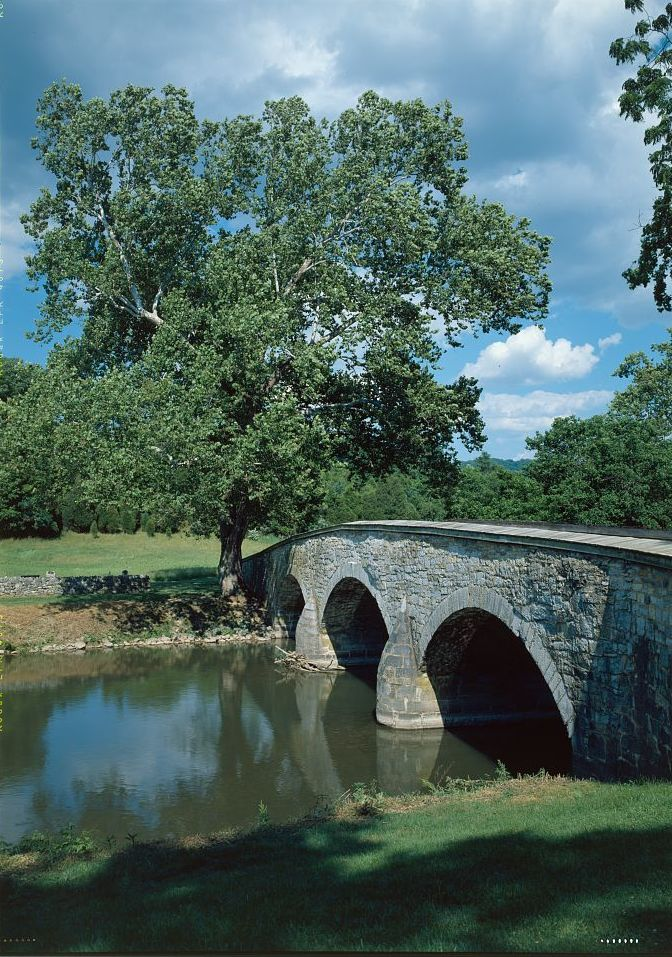
Burnside Sycamore Bridge

One of the most well known Civil war era trees is the Burnside Sycamore located on the Antietam National Battlefield in Maryland. After the battle of Antietam, Alexander Gardner photographed Burnside's Bridge, along with the young sycamore sapling. The tree has faced many casualties and still remains as an important landmark and feature to the site.

=== The Sickles Oak ===
The Sickles Oak is located in Gettysburg, Pennsylvania, near the Trostle Farm. The oak is known for its use by Daniel Sickles on 2 July 1863 during the Civil War. While in search of a command post, Sickles gathered his men and rested under the shade. The moment was commemorated by Bugler Charles Reed in a sketch.

=== Oklahoma City Survivor ===
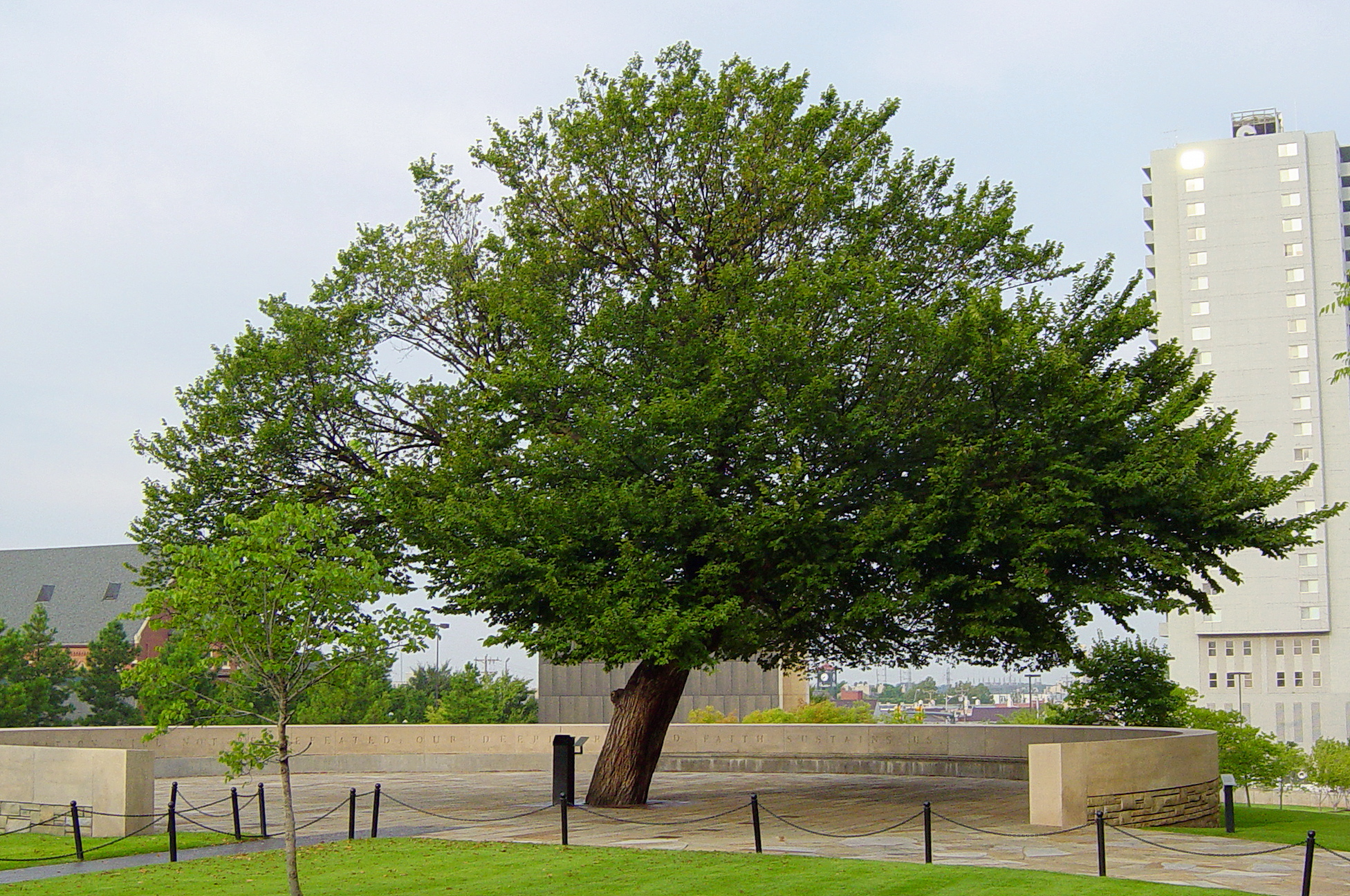
Oklahoma City Survivor Tree

The Oklahoma City survivor tree is an American elm located in downtown Oklahoma City. On 19 April 1995 Timothy McVeigh bombed the Alfred P. Murrah Federal Building. The survivor elm had absorbed some of the blast and had glass and metal embedded into its bark. The elm was initially wanted for evidence but survivors and family members of those killed in the blast had pleaded to save the elm. The elm is now the focal point of the Oklahoma City National Memorial.

=== George Washington's Mount Vernon Historic Tree ===
Located on Mount Vernon in Virginia, the George Washington's Mount Vernon Historic tree is believed to have been planted during the 1780s. The tree was known to have witnessed George Washington’s life, including his return home from presidency. The tree was also carved with corps insignia by Union troops while they were stationed during the Civil War.

=== Manassas White Oak ===
Located in the Manassas National Battle Park in Virginia, along with numerous other witness trees, the Manassas White Oak sits near Stone bridge. The oak was there to witness both the First and Second Battles of Manassas. This oak in particular is well known from a photograph taken by George N. Bernard in March 1862 where the tree is captured with the remains of the bridge and landscape.

=== Catalpa Trees ===
In 1889 the Survey Lodge Ranger Station was completed southwest of the Washington Monument. No trees or shrubs were planted around the station at the time but by 1902 many trees including various Catalpa Trees were present.

=== White Mulberry Tree ===
Established naturally around the year 1910, the While Mulberry Tree is located southwest of the Washington Monument. Evidence of the Mulberry tree dates back from the year 1969. The evidence is a picture from a march against the Vietnam War. The tree is also believed to have also witnessed the March on Washington for Jobs and Freedom.

=== Circle of Willow Oak Trees ===
It is believed that a circle of Willow Oaks were planted in the 1920s south of the Vietnam Women's Memorial. Regardless of when they were planted, they were there to witness the creation of the Constitution Gardens in 1976 and addition of statues to the Vietnam Women's Memorial.

=== Cork Trees ===
Several Amur cork trees that are said to be at least 30 years old are in the area of the Franklin Delano Roosevelt Memorial. It is possible they were there to witness the Thomas Jefferson Memorial construction and its dedication in 1943.

=== Yoshino Cherry Trees ===
A row of Cherry Trees along the Tidal Basin in Washington DC were originally a gift from Japan as a symbol of friendship in 1910. The cherry trees given were infected with bugs and diseases and so Japan replaced their gift with a new set of Cherry Trees in 1912. Two Yoshino cherry trees were planted on the Northern Bank of the tidal basin by Helen Herron Taft and the Viscountess Chinda, wife of the Japanese Ambassador, on 27 March 1912. This ceremony started Washington DC's renowned National Cherry Blossom Festival.

=== Hangman's Elm ===
Hangman's Elm in Washington Square Park in Greenwich Village, Manhattan, New York City, is said to have been around in the time of the Revolutionary War.

=== Eutaw Springs Battleground ===
As of 2026 a live oak stands adjacent to the Eutaw Springs Battleground site in South Carolina.
