= Glassmanor, Maryland =

Glassmanor
- Census-designated place
- Location in Maryland Glassmanor (the United States)
- Coordinates: 38°49′08″N 76°59′55″W
- Country: United States
- State: Maryland
- County: Prince George's

Area
  - Total: 2.32 sq mi (6.02 km^{2})
  - Land: 2.32 sq mi (6.02 km^{2})
  - Water: 0 sq mi (0.00 km^{2})

Population (2020)
  - Total: 18,430
  - Density: 7,925.6/sq mi (3,060.09/km^{2})
- Time zone: UTC-5 (Eastern (EST))
  - Summer (DST): UTC-4 (EDT)
- FIPS code: 24-32350
- GNIS feature ID: 597451

Glassmanor is an unincorporated community and census-designated place in Prince George's County, Maryland, United States. As of the 2020 census, it had a population of 18,430. In the 1990 and 2000 censuses, the United States Census Bureau had placed Glassmanor and the adjacent community of Oxon Hill in the "Oxon Hill-Glassmanor" census-designated place for statistical purposes. Glassmanor was last delineated separately in 1980, when the CDP recorded a population of 7,751.

The original Glassmanor apartments were built circa 1950 by the Glassman company, just outside the border of southeast Washington. In the mid-1950s, the Eastover shopping center was built across the highway, followed by other adjoining apartment projects in the 1960s. U.S. Senator George McGovern, who was the Democratic Party's presidential candidate in 1972, lived briefly in Glassmanor while a freshman congressman. The area has undergone tremendous demographic and social changes since that time.

== Geography ==
According to the U.S. Census Bureau, Glassmanor has a total area of 2.4 square miles (6.1 km^{2}), all land. The CDP is bordered by Washington, D.C. to the northwest, the town of Forest Heights to the west, Oxon Hill to the south, Temple Hills to the southeast, Marlow Heights to the east, and Hillcrest Heights to the northeast. Interstate 495/95, the Capital Beltway, forms the southern boundary of the Glassmanor CDP.

== Demographics ==
Historical population
Census	Pop.	Note	%±
1980	7,751		—
2010	17,295		—
2020	18,430		6.6%
U.S. Decennial Census; 2010 2020

Glassmanor first appeared as a census designated place in the 2010 U.S. census formed from part of deleted Oxon Hill-Glassmanor CDP and additional area.

=== Racial and ethnic composition ===
Glassmanor CDP, Maryland – Racial and ethnic composition Note: the US Census treats Hispanic/Latino as an ethnic category. This table excludes Latinos from the racial categories and assigns them to a separate category. Hispanics/Latinos may be of any race.
Race / Ethnicity (NH = Non-Hispanic)	Pop 2010	Pop 2020	% 2010	% 2020
White alone (NH)	275	298	1.59%	1.62%
Black or African American alone (NH)	15,254	13,581	88.20%	73.69%
Native American or Alaska Native alone (NH)	24	40	0.14%	0.22%
Asian alone (NH)	126	179	0.73%	0.97%
Native Hawaiian or Pacific Islander alone (NH)	5	7	0.03%	0.04%
Other race alone (NH)	23	86	0.13%	0.47%
Mixed race or Multiracial (NH)	286	406	1.65%	2.20%
Hispanic or Latino (any race)	1,302	3,833	7.53%	20.80%
Total	17,295	18,430	100.00%	100.00%

=== 2020 census ===
As of the 2020 census, Glassmanor had a population of 18,430. The median age was 33.7 years. 24.4% of residents were under the age of 18 and 11.4% of residents were 65 years of age or older. For every 100 females there were 86.5 males, and for every 100 females age 18 and over there were 82.0 males age 18 and over.

100.0% of residents lived in urban areas, while 0.0% lived in rural areas.

There were 7,169 households in Glassmanor, of which 33.9% had children under the age of 18 living in them. Of all households, 22.4% were married-couple households, 24.0% were households with a male householder and no spouse or partner present, and 45.1% were households with a female householder and no spouse or partner present. About 33.3% of all households were made up of individuals and 8.1% had someone living alone who was 65 years of age or older.

There were 7,501 housing units, of which 4.4% were vacant. The homeowner vacancy rate was 1.5% and the rental vacancy rate was 4.4%.

Racial composition as of the 2020 census
Race	Number	Percent
White	461	2.5%
Black or African American	13,700	74.3%
American Indian and Alaska Native	131	0.7%
Asian	185	1.0%
Native Hawaiian and Other Pacific Islander	8	0.0%
Some other race	3,048	16.5%
Two or more races	897	4.9%

== Government ==
Prince George's County Police Department District 4 Station in Glassmanor CDP, with an Oxon Hill postal address, serves the community. The Prince George's County Fire/EMS Department and Oxon Hill Volunteer Fire Department provide fire protection and emergency medical services from Fire Station 842 located in Glassmanor.

== Education ==
Residents are zoned to Prince George's County Public Schools (PGCPS).

Elementary schools serving sections of the CDP include Barnaby Manor, Forest Heights, Glassmanor, and Valley View. Benjamin Stoddert and Oxon Hill middle schools serve sections of the CDP. All residents are zoned to Potomac High School.

The former Owens Road Elementary School was located within the Glassmanor CDP. The school closed on June 18, 2009.

== See also ==
- Oxon Hill, Maryland
