= Butler House (Oxon Hill, Maryland) =

Collapsed historic house in Maryland, US

- U.S. National Register of Historic Places
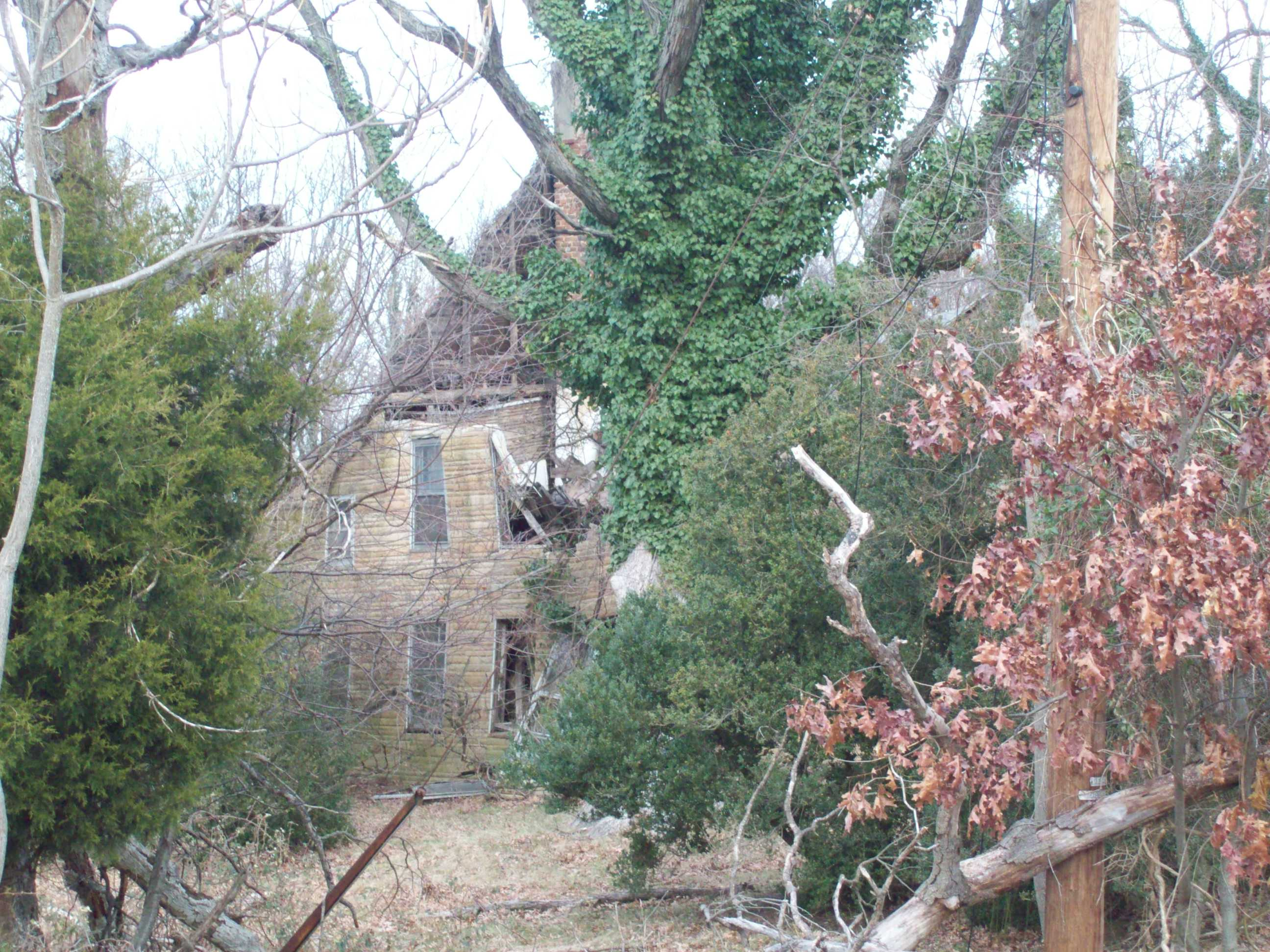
- Butler House, December 2010

- Location within Maryland Location within the United States
- Location: 6403 Oxon Hill Road, Oxon Hill, Maryland
- Coordinates: 38°48′24″N 77°0′13″W
- Area: 9.4 acres (3.8 ha)
- Built: 1853
- Architect: Butler, Henry Alexander
- MPS: African-American Historic Resources of Prince George's County, Maryland
- NRHP reference No.: 05000147
- Added to NRHP: March 14, 2005

The Butler House was a historic home of importance to local African American history and located at Oxon Hill, Prince George's County, Maryland, United States. Henry Alexander Butler, a free African American man from Charles County, moved with his family to the property in 1853, and the property has been continuously associated with the Butler family. Henry Butler became a Reconstruction era community leader, serving as trustee of the nearby Freedmen's Bureau school. The Butler House was a 2 1/2-story, one room deep wood-frame and log residence covered in cast stone. It sat in a secluded, forested area, adjacent to the Oxon Hill Children's Farm. As of December 2010, the house is in a severely dilapidated condition. In 2020 the house collapsed and the property was sold in 2019.

The Butler House is listed on the National Register of Historic Places in 2005.
