= Oxon Hill-Glassmanor, Maryland =

- Former CDP
- Location of Oxon Hill-Glassmanor, Maryland
- Coordinates: 38°48′9″N 76°58′32″W
- Country: United States
- State: Maryland
- County: Prince George's

Area
  - Total: 9.0 sq mi (23.4 km^{2})
  - Land: 9.0 sq mi (23.4 km^{2})
  - Water: 0 sq mi (0.0 km^{2})

Population (2000)
  - Total: 35,355
  - Density: 3,912/sq mi (1,510.4/km^{2})
- Time zone: UTC−5 (Eastern (EST))
  - Summer (DST): UTC−4 (EDT)
- FIPS code: 24-59505

Oxon Hill-Glassmanor was a census-designated place (CDP) in Prince George's County, Maryland, for the 1990 and 2000 censuses. The combination is arbitrary, and in the mind of most local people there are two separate communities: Oxon Hill and Glassmanor. As of the 2010 census, Oxon Hill, National Harbor and Glassmanor were delineated as separate CDPs.

== History of Oxon Hill ==
Oxon Hill was named for the 18th Century manor home of Thomas Addison (which burned in 1895 but was replaced by another large Georgian-style home called "Oxon Hill Manor," now publicly owned, which has a river view). The community is bisected by the Capital Beltway (I-95/495) and is near the interstate Woodrow Wilson Bridge, whose gridlocked traffic (300,000 vehicles daily) backs-up daily into Oxon Hill until the wider replacement bridge is fully completed in 2008, bringing relief. (Thousands of white-collar commuters working in Northern Virginia's booming economy find that housing is cheaper in Prince George's County.)

Oxon Hill includes many garden apartment communities along with single-family detached homes dating mostly from the 1940s through the 1980s, including the incorporated town Forest Heights. In earlier decades, many residents were scientists from the adjacent U.S. Naval Research Laboratory, but very few are now. Oxon Hill's two principal shopping centers ("Rivertowne" and the much older "Eastover") attract neighborhood customers as well as shoppers from nearby Southeast Washington. Eastover, located at the D.C. state line, is a hub of many bus routes, some of them operating 24 hours a day, and has a Prince George's County Police station.

== Geography ==
Oxon Hill-Glassmanor is located at 38°48′9″N 76°58′32″W (38.802513, −76.975538).

According to the United States Census Bureau, the place had a total area of 9.0 square miles (23 km^{2}), all of it land.

== Demographics ==
Historical population
Census	Pop.	Note	%±
1990	35,794		—
2000	35,355		−1.2%

Oxon Hill-Glassmanor CDP, Maryland – Racial and ethnic composition Note: the US Census treats Hispanic/Latino as an ethnic category. This table excludes Latinos from the racial categories and assigns them to a separate category. Hispanics/Latinos may be of any race.
Race / Ethnicity (NH = Non-Hispanic)	Pop 2000	% 2000
White alone (NH)	2,602	7.36%
Black or African American alone (NH)	30,463	86.16%
Native American or Alaska Native alone (NH)	94	0.27%
Asian alone (NH)	980	2.77%
Native Hawaiian or Pacific Islander alone (NH)	28	0.08%
Other race alone (NH)	48	0.14%
Mixed race or Multiracial (NH)	547	1.55%
Hispanic or Latino (any race)	593	1.68%
Total	35,355	100.00%

As of the census of 2000, there were 35,355 people, 13,700 households, and 9,069 families residing in the area. The population density was 3,911.9 inhabitants per square mile (1,510.4/km^{2}). There were 14,669 housing units at an average density of 1,623.1 per square mile (626.7/km^{2}). The racial makeup of the area was 7.64% White, 86.68% African American, 0.32% Native American, 2.78% Asian, 0.08% Pacific Islander, 0.69% from other races, and 1.80% from two or more races. Hispanic or Latino of any race were 1.68% of the population.

There were 13,700 households, out of which 35.1% had children under the age of 18 living with them, 33.2% were married couples living together, 27.1% had a female householder with no husband present, and 33.8% were non-families. 28.0% of all households were made up of individuals, and 4.1% had someone living alone who was 65 years of age or older. The average household size was 2.58 and the average family size was 3.14.

In the area the population was spread out, with 28.5% under the age of 18, 9.3% from 18 to 24, 32.8% from 25 to 44, 22.8% from 45 to 64, and 6.5% who were 65 years of age or older. The median age was 32 years. For every 100 females, there were 84.3 males. For every 100 females age 18 and over, there were 76.9 males.

The median income for a household in the area was $46,483, and the median income for a family was $52,227. Males had a median income of $35,338 versus $34,646 for females. The per capita income for the area was $21,511. About 6.7% of families and 8.8% of the population were below the poverty line, including 12.3% of those under age 18 and 8.2% of those age 65 or over.
