= Frank Eugene Corder =

American truck driver and failed assassin (1956–1994)

- Born: May 26, 1956; Perry Point, Maryland, U.S.
- Died: September 12, 1994 (aged 38); White House, South Lawn, Washington, D.C., U.S.
- Cause of death: Suicide by plane crash
- Occupations: Former U.S. Army soldier Truck driver
- Known for: Crashing a plane into the White House lawn

Frank Eugene Corder (May 26, 1956 – September 12, 1994) was an American truck driver. He stole a Cessna 150 late on September 11, 1994, and crashed the stolen aircraft onto the South Lawn of the White House early on September 12, 1994, while attempting to land the plane; he was killed, and was the sole casualty.

== Early life and education ==
Corder was born in Perry Point, Maryland, the son of William Eugene Corder, who was an aircraft mechanic at Edgewood Arsenal, and Dorothy Corder. He dropped out of Aberdeen High School in 11th grade and enlisted in the U.S. Army in October 1974.

== Career ==
Corder was stationed at Fort Knox, Kentucky and Fort Carson, Colorado, where he was trained as a mechanic. He was honorably discharged from military service in July 1975 at the rank of private first class. After his service ended, he worked as a truck driver from 1976 until his employment was terminated in early 1993.

On April 15, 1993, Corder was arrested for theft and was arrested again later that year on October 9 for drug dealing. He was sentenced to spend 90 days at a drug rehabilitation center and was released in February 1994. After he was released, he was living with his third wife Lydia at Keyser's Motel in Aberdeen, Maryland. Lydia Corder left Frank three weeks prior to the incident, which is thought to have driven him towards deep depression and suicide. Friends claim he bore no ill will towards then U.S. President Bill Clinton and probably only wanted the publicity of the stunt, based largely on his sentiments towards Mathias Rust's flight of a Cessna 172 from Finland to Moscow, Soviet Union. The president was not in the White House at the time due to renovations, but was instead staying at Blair House.

== Incident ==
On the evening of September 11, 1994, Corder stole the Cessna and departed from Harford County Airport in Churchville, Maryland while severely intoxicated. The plane was noticed by radar technicians at Ronald Reagan Washington National Airport several minutes before he tried to steer it into the wall of the White House. At 1:49 a.m., he hit the South Lawn and was killed on impact. The base of the Jackson Magnolia was also damaged.

The crash caused a reevaluation in security procedures around the White House, as the pilot had entered restricted airspace. Though the White House is rumored to be equipped with surface-to-air missiles, none were fired; the Secret Service has neither confirmed nor dispelled the rumor; however, in 2019 a CBS reporter spotted an artillery battery on the roof of a building across the street.

== See also ==
- Samuel Byck
- Francisco Martin Duran
- List of White House security breaches
- United Airlines Flight 93 - Hijackers took control of the flight during the September 11 attacks, with a planned target of either the White House or the US Capitol. However the passengers and crew tried to take back the cockpit and during the ensuing struggle the plane crashed near Shanksville, Pennsylvania
