= Oxon Hill, Maryland =

- Census-designated place
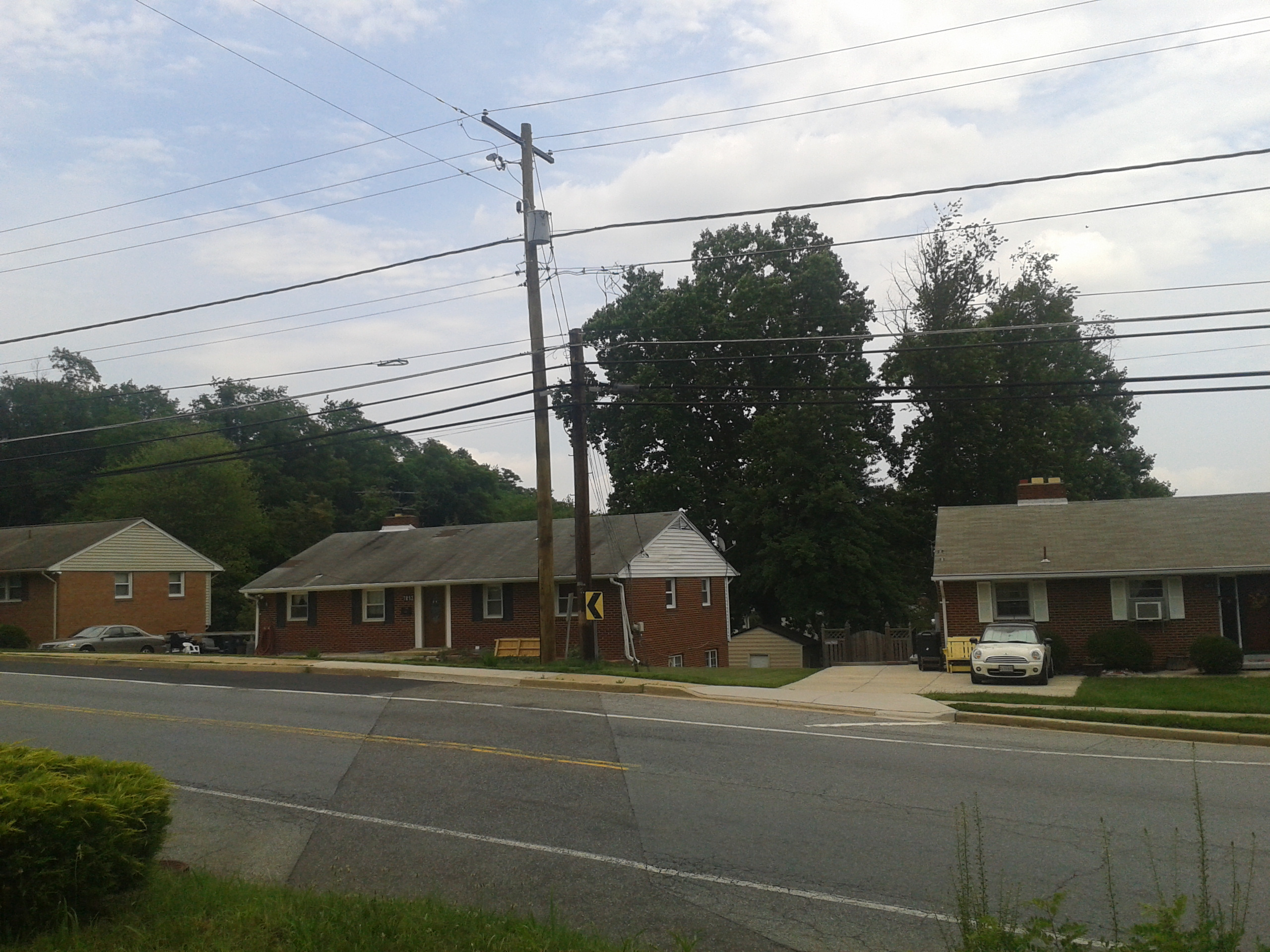
- Houses in Oxon Hill, 2015

- Location within the state of Maryland Oxon Hill (the United States)
- Coordinates: 38°48′11″N 76°59′23″W
- Country: United States
- State: Maryland
- County: Prince George's

Area
  - Total: 6.45 sq mi (16.70 km^{2})
  - Land: 6.44 sq mi (16.68 km^{2})
  - Water: 0.0077 sq mi (0.02 km^{2})

Population (2020)
  - Total: 18,791
  - Density: 2,918.2/sq mi (1,126.74/km^{2})
- Time zone: UTC−5 (Eastern (EST))
  - Summer (DST): UTC−4 (EDT)
- ZIP code: 20745
- Area codes: 301, 240
- FIPS code: 24-59500

Oxon Hill is an unincorporated area and census-designated place (CDP) in southern Prince George's County, Maryland, United States. Oxon Hill is a close suburb of Washington, located southeast of the downtown district and east of Alexandria, Virginia. In 2008, the 300-acre (120 ha) National Harbor development on the shore of the Potomac River opened in Oxon Hill; it has since become a CDP of its own.

For the 1990 and 2000 censuses, the United States Census Bureau defined a census-designated place consisting of Oxon Hill and the adjacent community of Glassmanor, designated Oxon Hill-Glassmanor, for statistical purposes. As of the 2010 census, Oxon Hill was delineated separately and had a population of 17,722. Per the 2020 census, the population was 18,791.

== History ==
Oxon Hill was named for the colonial 18th century manor home of Thomas Addison (which burned in 1895 but was replaced in 1929 by a large 49-room neo-Georgian-style home called Oxon Hill Manor, standing on a bluff over the Potomac River). The current Manor is now owned by the Maryland-National Capital Park and Planning Commission and is used for cultural activities, as well as being rented for weddings and special events. "Oxon" is an abbreviation for the Latin Oxoniensis, meaning "of Oxford." The area now known as Oxon Hill reminded Addison of the area near Oxford, England. The Revolutionary patriot John Hanson died while visiting the first Manor, and may be buried there in an unmarked grave.

Oxon Hill Manor, the Butler House, Oxon Cove Park, and St. Ignatius Church are listed on the National Register of Historic Places.

Today the community is bisected by the busy Capital Beltway (I-95/495), which includes the interstate Woodrow Wilson Bridge built in 1961. The enlarged bridge was opened December 15, 2008, and highway interchanges and ramps near the bridge were also re-aligned and re-configured. Prior to that date, traffic backed up into Oxon Hill daily for decades as 250,000–300,000 vehicles a day crossed the Wilson Bridge.

Oxon Hill includes many garden apartment and townhouse communities along with single-family detached homes built mostly between the 1940s when suburban development began, through the early 1990s (except for the newer National Harbor condominiums), including the incorporated town Forest Heights. Oxon Hill's two principal shopping centers ("Rivertowne", built about 1985 and "Eastover", built about 1955) attract neighborhood customers as well as shoppers from nearby Southeast Washington, D.C. Eastover, located at the D.C./state line, is a hub of many bus routes, some of them operating 24 hours a day, and has a Prince George's County Police station. The apartment communities closest to the D.C. line are informally called by their original name "Glassmanor", although rental companies have officially given them newer names. Rather unusual community features of Oxon Hill are a nursing home and a large cultural center, both operated for an ethnic Filipino population who are numerous in Oxon Hill and Fort Washington.

Until about 1960, the community used the mailing address Washington, D.C., before getting its own postal designation. About 1980, the United States Postal Service detached the two-thirds of greater Oxon Hill that was furthest from Washington, D.C., and re-defined that part as a new postal designation, Fort Washington, MD. To make mail sorting easier at that time, the new postal boundary line separating the two Maryland communities was drawn along already existing zip code boundaries. (The former zip 20021 portion of Oxon Hill remained Oxon Hill with the new code 20745, while everything in the former zip 20022 portion of Oxon Hill about 1980 was automatically renamed the new Fort Washington 20744.) Illogically, this partitioning reassigned some areas that seem to be almost in the heart of Oxon Hill (such as all of the Bock Road, Tucker Road, Murray Hills, and Brinkley Road areas, including several large prominent churches, Rosecroft Raceway, the ice rink, and ironically even Oxon Hill Middle School) to Fort Washington mailing addresses, which can cause confusion.

== Geography ==
Oxon Hill is located in Prince George's County along Maryland Route 210 (Indian Head Highway) and Maryland Route 414 (Oxon Hill Road), less than 2 miles (3 km) south of the boundary of Washington. The CDP lies directly south of the Capital Beltway (I-495/I-95), just east of the Woodrow Wilson Bridge over the Potomac River.

According to the U.S. Census Bureau, the total area of Oxon Hill is 6.6 square miles (17.2 km^{2}), of which 6.6 square miles (17.1 km^{2}) is land and 0.01 square miles (0.03 km^{2}), or 0.20%, is water.

== Demographics ==
Historical population
Census	Pop.	Note	%±
1970	11,974		—
1980	36,267		202.9%
2010	17,722		—
2020	18,791		6.0%
U.S. Decennial Census; 2010 2020; Not enumerated separately in 1990 & 2000. Community combined with Glassmanor to form Oxon Hill-Glassmanor for 1990 and 2000 censuses.

Oxon Hill first appeared as a census designated place in the 2010 U.S. census formed from parts of the deleted Oxon Hill-Glassmanor CDP.

=== Racial and ethnic composition ===
Oxon Hill CDP, Maryland – Racial and ethnic composition Note: the US Census treats Hispanic/Latino as an ethnic category. This table excludes Latinos from the racial categories and assigns them to a separate category. Hispanics/Latinos may be of any race.
Race / Ethnicity (NH = Non-Hispanic)	Pop 2010	Pop 2020	% 2010	% 2020
White alone (NH)	1,073	833	6.05%	4.43%
Black or African American alone (NH)	13,235	12,064	74.68%	64.20%
Native American or Alaska Native alone (NH)	58	51	0.33%	0.27%
Asian alone (NH)	1,006	1,030	5.68%	5.48%
Native Hawaiian or Pacific Islander alone (NH)	6	14	0.03%	0.07%
Other race alone (NH)	25	81	0.14%	0.43%
Mixed race or Multiracial (NH)	393	530	2.22%	2.82%
Hispanic or Latino (any race)	1,926	4,188	10.87%	22.29%
Total	17,722	18,791	100.00%	100.00%

=== 2020 census ===
As of the 2020 census, Oxon Hill had a population of 18,791. The median age was 39.0 years. 21.1% of residents were under the age of 18 and 16.7% of residents were 65 years of age or older. For every 100 females there were 85.8 males, and for every 100 females age 18 and over there were 82.1 males age 18 and over.

100.0% of residents lived in urban areas, while 0.0% lived in rural areas.

There were 7,375 households in Oxon Hill, of which 28.7% had children under the age of 18 living in them. Of all households, 30.9% were married-couple households, 20.5% were households with a male householder and no spouse or partner present, and 42.9% were households with a female householder and no spouse or partner present. About 33.6% of all households were made up of individuals and 12.4% had someone living alone who was 65 years of age or older.

There were 7,852 housing units, of which 6.1% were vacant. The homeowner vacancy rate was 1.6% and the rental vacancy rate was 6.3%.

Racial composition as of the 2020 census
Race	Number	Percent
White	1,123	6.0%
Black or African American	12,150	64.7%
American Indian and Alaska Native	146	0.8%
Asian	1,033	5.5%
Native Hawaiian and Other Pacific Islander	17	0.1%
Some other race	3,103	16.5%
Two or more races	1,219	6.5%

== Parks and recreation ==
Rosecroft Raceway (founded in 1949) and Henson Creek Golf Course (a nine-hole course) are among Oxon Hill's recreational attractions; Rosecroft Raceway offers a limited number of harness horse racing dates throughout the year, as well as betting on select televised simulcast races from around the country (per article in Washington Post, May 20, 2010). (The Maryland slot machine referendum in November 2008 did not include Rosecroft in its list of possible sites to add slots.)

The Parks Commission's 1974 Tucker Road ice skating rink, at the Tucker Road Athletic Complex, was enclosed and expanded to year-round use in 2005; across from it is the Tucker Road Community Center and nearby is a private swimming club, the Oxon Hill Recreation Club (OHRC). OHRC has been in continuous operation since 1958. A 37,000 square foot gymnasium and recreation and learning center (Southern Regional Technology & Recreation Complex) opened in 2013, on Bock Road. The Henson Creek paved hiker-biker trail extends 5.5 miles (8.9 km) paralleling Henson Creek, a tributary to the Potomac River. Oxon Cove Farm (formerly Oxon Hill Children's Farm) is a free of charge, educational facility operated daily for families by the National Park Service adjacent to, but separate from National Harbor. The farm also has a bicycle trail used by a few commuters to nearby government facilities. Public indoor and outdoor swimming pools are also located on Allentown Road near Padgett's Corner at the Allentown Splash, Tennis and Fitness Park.

Oxon Hill is also the location of National Harbor, a major development on the Potomac River: a 7,300,000-square-foot (680,000 m^{2}) mixed-use community including 2,500 residential units, 4,000 hotel rooms, 1,000,000 square feet (93,000 m^{2}) of retail, upscale dining, and entertainment, and 500,000 square feet (46,000 m^{2}) of class-"A" office space, along with one of the largest marinas on the Potomac and the 2,000 room Gaylord National Resort & Convention Center, the largest hotel in the entire Washington area. The first phase of the development began opening in April 2008, and is currently well into its second phase.

The MGM National Harbor Resort Casino, located at the entrance to the National Harbor development and a $950 million project, opened on December 8, 2016.

== Education ==
=== Primary and secondary schools ===
Residents are zoned to Prince George's County Public Schools (PGCPS):

Elementary schools serving sections of the CDP include Apple Grove, Avalon, J. Frank Dent, Flintstone, Oxon Hill, Valley View and Tayac.

Middle schools serving the CDP include Isaac J. Gourdine, Oxon Hill, and Thurgood Marshall.

High schools serving sections of the CDP include Oxon Hill High School, Crossland High School, and Friendly High School. Oxon Hill High has a magnet science and technology program, which is offered at only three of the county's high schools; The original buildings from 1959 have been completely replaced by a new facility, which opened in August 2013.

Another magnet school in Oxon Hill is the K–8 Maya Angelou French Immersion School whose mission is to ensure that all students acquire knowledge and skills, through speaking, reading and writing the French language. The French Immersion school is also attached to the John Hanson Montessori School which upholds the teaching ideals of Italian educator Maria Montessori. Both are located in the former John Hanson Junior High School building, which is next door to the main Oxon Hill post office.

There is a Roman Catholic private school, St. Columba School. It was established in 1962.

=== Public libraries ===
Prince George's County Memorial Library System operates the Oxon Hill Library. It completely remodeled and reopened in 2005. Originally built in 1967, the Oxon Hill Library Branch contains the Sojourner Truth Room, an African American research collection. This comprehensive collection of reference materials on African American history and culture includes over 16,000 cataloged items (many are rare or out-of-print), periodicals, sheet music by African American composers, pictures and posters. Vertical files contain pamphlets, clippings and bibliographies. Copies of selected materials are also in the Oxon Hill Branch's circulating collection. An extensive collection of current and historical periodicals, including the NAACP's Crisis from 1910, the Journal of Negro History from 1916 and Ebony from 1945. The collection includes original editions of some slave narratives, as well as many reprint editions and the thirty-one volume Writer's Project series. Other topics are antislavery and slavery tracts, literary criticism, and the history of African Americans in Maryland and Prince George's County.

== Government ==
Prince George's County Police Department District 4 Station in Glassmanor CDP, with an Oxon Hill postal address, serves the community.

The U.S. Postal Service operates the Oxon Hill Post Office in the CDP.

== Infrastructure ==
=== Major roads ===
MD 414
MD 210
I-495

== Notable people ==
- John H. Bayne, Union Army physician, horticulturist, and member of the Maryland House of Delegates and Senate. The land that his plantation, "Salubria", once occupied is directly adjacent to National Harbor and is now the location of Tanger Outlets shopping complex.
- Singer Eva Cassidy, who rose to prominence in United Kingdom after her untimely death in 1996 at age 33 from cancer, lived with her family in Oxon Hill in her early years.
- Ronald Darby, cornerback for NFL's Denver Broncos; born in Oxon Hill and attended Potomac High School.
- Roger L. Easton, Naval scientist, chief inventor of GPS, winner of 2004 Presidential National Medal of Technology; lived on Oxon Hill Road (more information is on "Google images").
- Actress Taraji P. Henson, winner of Golden Globe award for TV series Empire, nominee for Academy Award for Best Supporting Actress in 2009, attended Oxon Hill High School.
- G. Gordon Liddy, FBI bureau chief, lawyer, Richard Nixon's White House Staff Assistant, key Watergate figure, author, and nationally syndicated radio talk show host.
- U.S. Senator George McGovern, Democratic presidential candidate, and family lived briefly in Glassmanor while a freshman U.S. congressman.
- Sammy Nestico, distinguished band music composer/arranger, lived in Birchwood City in 1960s.
- Jason Reynolds (born December 6, 1983), American author of novels and poetry for young adult and middle-grade audiences, grew up in Oxon Hill and has drawn inspiration for his books from his childhood experiences there.
- Arnie Sachs (1928–2006), photojournalist, took famous photo of teenager Bill Clinton shaking hands with President John F. Kennedy
- Sumner Welles, U.S. Undersecretary of State to Franklin D. Roosevelt, lived in second "Oxon Hill Manor" home and hosted Roosevelt and possibly Sir Winston Churchill there. Home was later occupied by Fred Maloof (wealthy oilman, timberland tycoon, and art collector) before coming into ownership of Maryland-National Capital Park and Planning Commission.
- Tavon Young, cornerback for NFL's Baltimore Ravens, fourth-round pick out of Temple University, graduate of Potomac High School.
