= Forest Heights, Maryland =

- Town
- Town of Forest Heights
- Flag Seal

- Location of Forest Heights, Maryland
- Coordinates: 38°48′43″N 76°59′49″W
- Country: United States of America
- State: Maryland
- County: Prince George's
- Incorporated: 1949

Area
  - Total: 1.75 sq mi (4.54 km^{2})
  - Land: 1.65 sq mi (4.28 km^{2})
  - Water: 0.097 sq mi (0.25 km^{2})
- Elevation: 161 ft (49 m)

Population (2020)
  - Total: 2,658
  - Density: 1,606.8/sq mi (620.39/km^{2})
- Time zone: UTC-5 (Eastern (EST))
  - Summer (DST): UTC-4 (EDT)
- ZIP code: 20745
- Area codes: 301, 240
- FIPS code: 24-28725
- GNIS feature ID: 0597408
- Website: forestheightsmd.gov

Forest Heights is a town in Prince George's County, Maryland, United States, and is part of the larger postal designation of Oxon Hill. The town straddles both sides of dual-lane Maryland Route 210 and includes two elementary schools. Per the 2020 census, the population was 2,658.

== History ==
A few homes (such as on Huron Drive) were built in the 1930s, but most of the town developed in the 1940s and early 1950s, consisting of single-family homes with some streets of duplex homes; the Talbert Drive homes were added in the 1960s. In those days many town residents were scientists at the adjacent U.S. Naval Research Laboratory, while others were military band musicians or other Federal employees. The town's population figure declined substantially over several decades, but since 2000 is now rising again.

Two especially long-serving mayors were Clifford Armhold and Warren F. Adams.

After decades of former governmental stability, in the 2000s the town made headlines repeatedly as two of its recent mayors were embroiled in clashes with the town council. One mayor, Joyce Beck, was ousted from office after changes to the Town Charter. In June 2009 her successor, Myles Spires, filed a $15 million lawsuit against the town for malicious prosecution after being cleared of all charges initiated by the town for misuse of town's funds. In 2019, the town annexed 446.88 acres of additional land, more than doubling its size.

== Geography ==
Forest Heights is located at 38°48′43″N 76°59′49″W (38.811863, -76.996809). According to the United States Census Bureau, the town has a total area of 0.48 square miles (1.24 km^{2}), all land.

=== Adjacent areas ===
- National Harbor (southwest)
- Oxon Hill (southeast)
- Glassmanor (northeast)
- Bellevue, Congress Heights and Anacostia neighborhoods of Washington, D.C. (north)

== Demographics ==
Historical population
Census	Pop.	Note	%±
1950	1,125		—
1960	3,524		213.2%
1970	3,497		−0.8%
1980	2,999		−14.2%
1990	2,859		−4.7%
2000	2,585		−9.6%
2010	2,447		−5.3%
2020	2,658		8.6%
U.S. Decennial Census; 2010 2020

=== Racial and ethnic composition ===
Forest Heights town, Maryland – Racial and ethnic composition Note: the US Census treats Hispanic/Latino as an ethnic category. This table excludes Latinos from the racial categories and assigns them to a separate category. Hispanics/Latinos may be of any race.
Race / Ethnicity (NH = Non-Hispanic)	Pop 2000	Pop 2010	Pop 2020	% 2000	% 2010	% 2020
White alone (NH)	323	174	113	12.50%	7.11%	4.25%
Black or African American alone (NH)	2,037	1,836	1,527	78.80%	75.03%	57.45%
Native American or Alaska Native alone (NH)	3	7	3	0.12%	0.29%	0.11%
Asian alone (NH)	86	95	73	3.33%	3.88%	2.75%
Native Hawaiian or Pacific Islander alone (NH)	9	3	7	0.35%	0.12%	0.26%
Other race alone (NH)	5	11	18	0.19%	0.45%	0.68%
Mixed race or Multiracial (NH)	46	45	69	1.78%	1.84%	2.60%
Hispanic or Latino (any race)	76	276	848	2.94%	11.28%	31.90%
Total	2,585	2,447	2,658	100.00%	100.00%	100.00%

=== 2020 census ===
As of the 2020 census, Forest Heights had a population of 2,658. The median age was 39.9 years. 21.4% of residents were under the age of 18 and 17.4% of residents were 65 years of age or older. For every 100 females there were 91.4 males, and for every 100 females age 18 and over there were 90.2 males age 18 and over.

100.0% of residents lived in urban areas, while 0.0% lived in rural areas.

There were 886 households in Forest Heights, of which 34.4% had children under the age of 18 living in them. Of all households, 36.8% were married-couple households, 20.1% were households with a male householder and no spouse or partner present, and 37.2% were households with a female householder and no spouse or partner present. About 22.7% of all households were made up of individuals and 10.3% had someone living alone who was 65 years of age or older.

There were 957 housing units, of which 7.4% were vacant. The homeowner vacancy rate was 3.3% and the rental vacancy rate was 9.2%.

=== 2010 census ===
As of the census of 2010, there were 2,447 people, 868 households, and 619 families residing in the town. The population density was 5,097.9 inhabitants per square mile (1,968.3/km^{2}). There were 927 housing units at an average density of 1,931.3 per square mile (745.7/km^{2}). The racial makeup of the town was 11.9% White, 75.4% African American, 0.3% Native American, 3.9% Asian, 0.1% Pacific Islander, 5.8% from other races, and 2.6% from two or more races. Hispanic or Latino of any race were 11.3% of the population.

There were 868 households, of which 31.3% had children under the age of 18 living with them, 39.3% were married couples living together, 24.4% had a female householder with no husband present, 7.6% had a male householder with no wife present, and 28.7% were non-families. 22.7% of all households were made up of individuals, and 7.1% had someone living alone who was 65 years of age or older. The average household size was 2.82 and the average family size was 3.26.

The median age in the town was 41.1 years. 20.8% of residents were under the age of 18; 9.9% were between the ages of 18 and 24; 24.6% were from 25 to 44; 31.4% were from 45 to 64; and 13.4% were 65 years of age or older. The gender makeup of the town was 47.9% male and 52.1% female.

== Public safety ==
The town is served by its own Forest Heights Police Department, which maintains primary responsibility for the response to and prevention and investigation of the majority of all crimes within the corporate limits. Under a memorandum of understanding, the Prince George's County Police Department serves as the secondary responding law enforcement agency for the town, and the primary investigating agency for most serious crimes, such as homicide or rape. Since 2019 the Chief of Police has been Anthony Rease.

The County Police Department maintains its District IV station just outside Forest Height's northern border at Eastover Shopping Center, in Glassmanor CDP. Fire and rescue services are provided by Prince George's County Fire Department from neighboring Company 42 and Company 21, both in Oxon Hill.

== Transportation ==
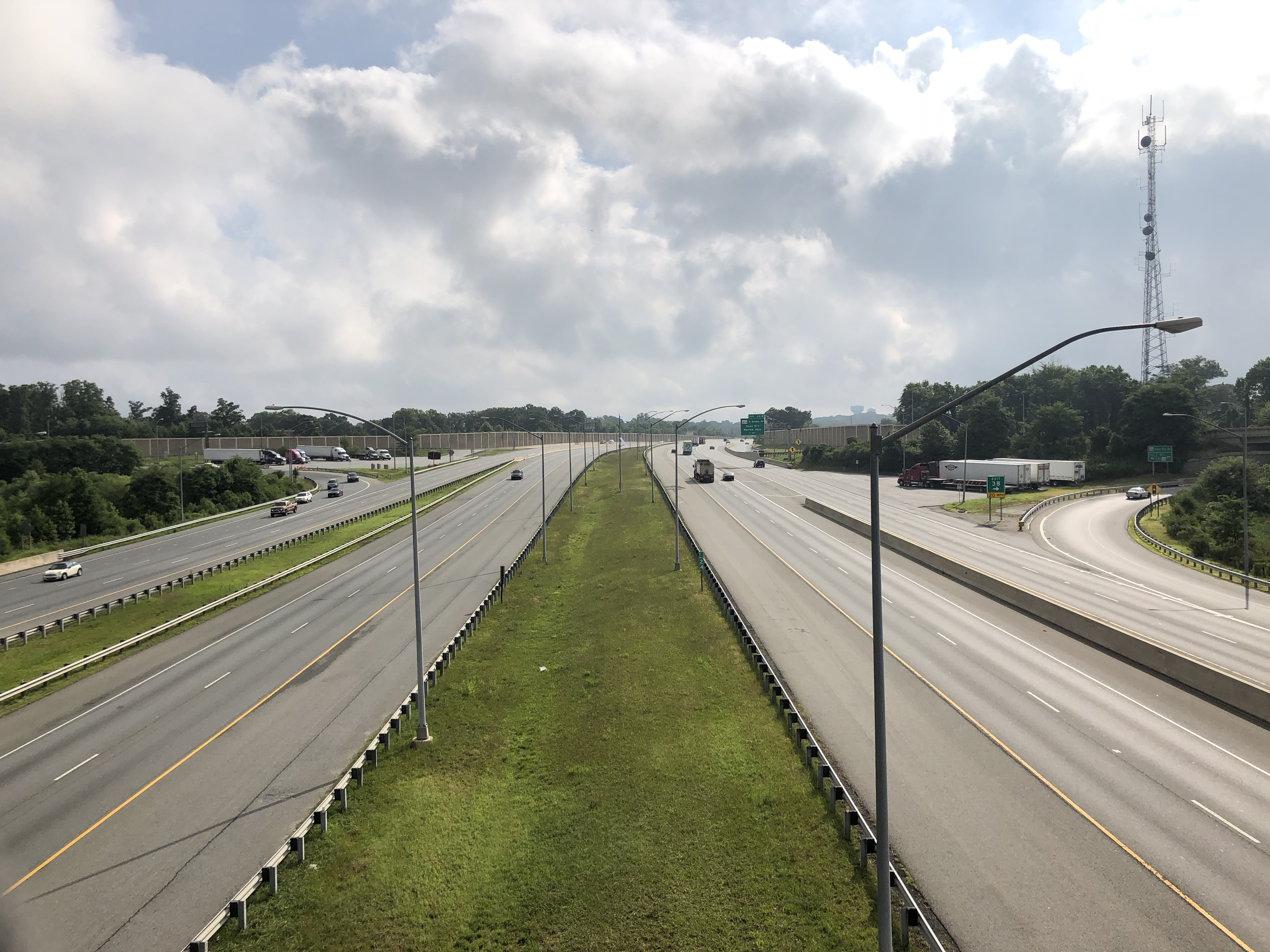
I-95/I-495 northbound in Forest Heights

The most prominent highway serving Forest Heights is Interstate 95/Interstate 495 (the Capital Beltway). I-495 follows the Capital Beltway around Washington, D.C., providing access to its many other suburbs. I-95 only follows the eastern portion of the beltway, diverging away from the beltway near both its north and south ends. To the north, I-95 passes through Baltimore, Philadelphia, New York City and Boston on its way to Canada, while to the south, it traverses Richmond on its way to Florida.

Maryland Route 210 and Maryland Route 414 also serve Forest Heights. MD 210 provides the direct access from Forest Heights to I-95/I-495, following Indian Head Highway from the Washington, D.C. border southward to Indian Head. MD 414 follows Saint Barnabas Road, running parallel to the Capital Beltway and providing local access to nearby communities.

== Education ==
Prince George's County Public Schools operates public schools serving Forest Heights. There are two elementary schools in the town limits, Forest Heights and Flintstone; these two schools serve separate portions of Forest Heights. All residents are zoned to Oxon Hill Middle School and Potomac High School.

Prince George's County Memorial Library System operates the Oxon Hill Library in nearby Oxon Hill.
