= Perry Point, Maryland =

Unincorporated community in Maryland, United States

- Unincorporated community
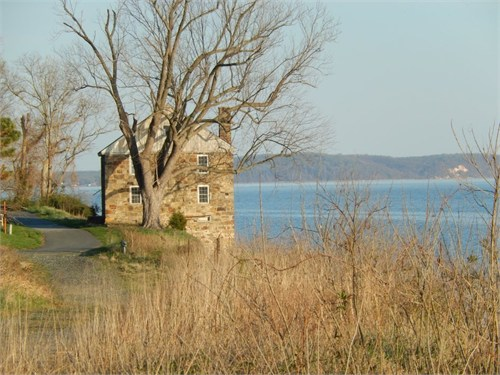
- A historic grist mill at Perry Point

- Location within the State of Maryland Perry Point (the United States)
- Coordinates: 39°33′15″N 76°04′19″W
- Country: United States
- State: Maryland
- County: Cecil
- Elevation: 43 ft (13 m)
- Time zone: UTC-5 (Eastern (EST))
  - Summer (DST): UTC-4 (EDT)
- ZIP Code: 21902
- Area codes: 410, 443, and 667
- GNIS feature ID: 590996

Perry Point is an unincorporated community in Cecil County, Maryland, United States. Perry Point is located on the east bank of the Susquehanna River south of Perryville and north of the river's mouth into the Chesapeake Bay.

== Notable person ==
- Frank Eugene Corder, American truck driver who flew a stolen airplane on the South Lawn of the White House and was killed on September 12, 1994
