= Jackson Magnolia =

Magnolia tree near the White House, to 2025

Coordinates: 38°53′51″N 77°2′12″W

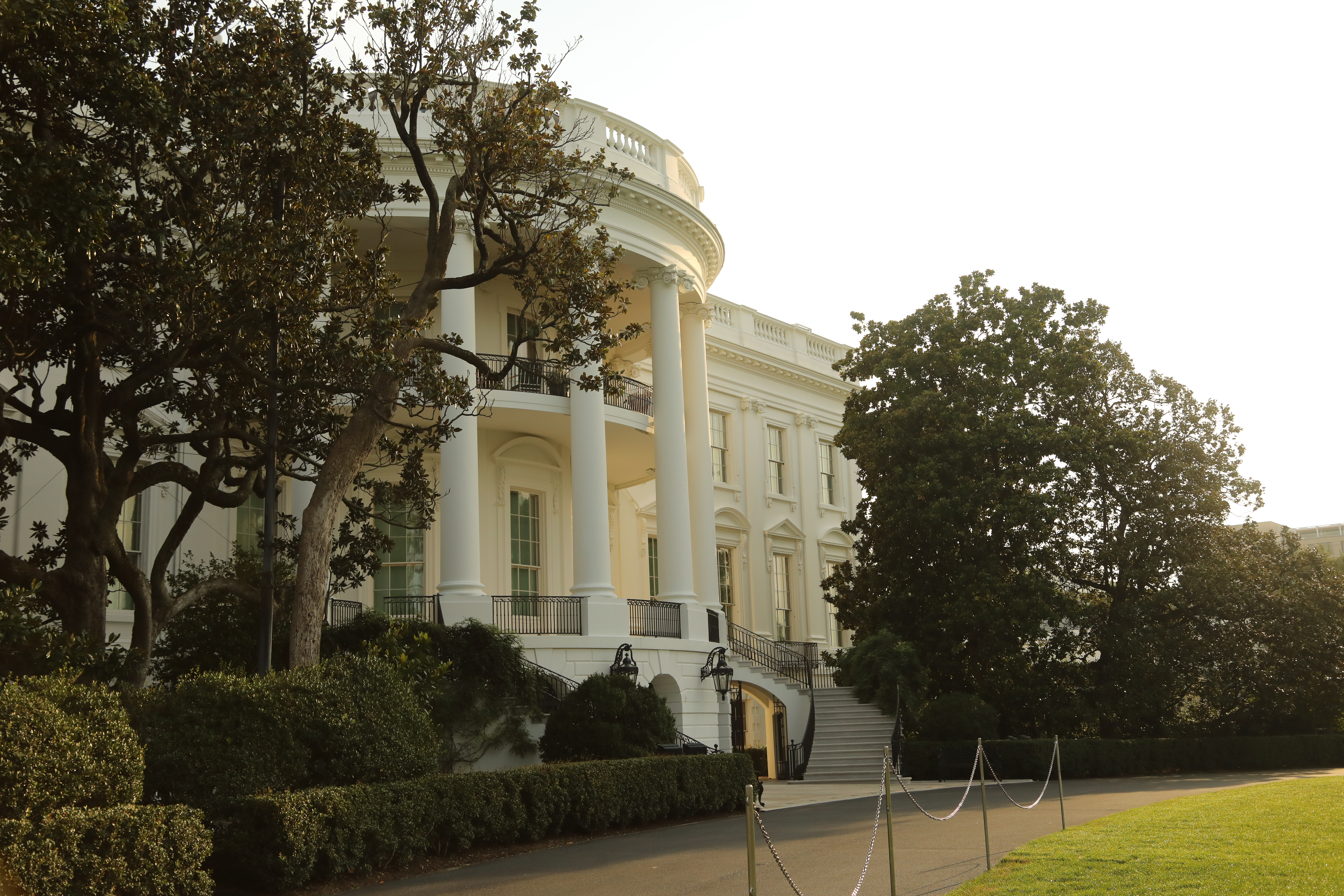
The Jackson Magnolia is left of the center and right of the silver pole

The Jackson Magnolia was a southern magnolia (Magnolia grandiflora) tree that was near the curved portico of the White House. The tree was planted in honor of Rachel Jackson, and the Jackson Magnolia was designated a Witness Tree by the National Park Service. A large section of the Jackson Magnolia was removed in 2017 and the whole tree was removed in 2025 due to safety concerns.

== History ==
According to the National Park Service, folklore mentioned that the seeds for the Jackson Magnolia were brought to Jackson from the Hermitage. The seeds were planted in honor of Rachel Jackson, who died before Jackson could assume office in 1829. Photographs show that the magnolia tree sprouted in the 1860s.

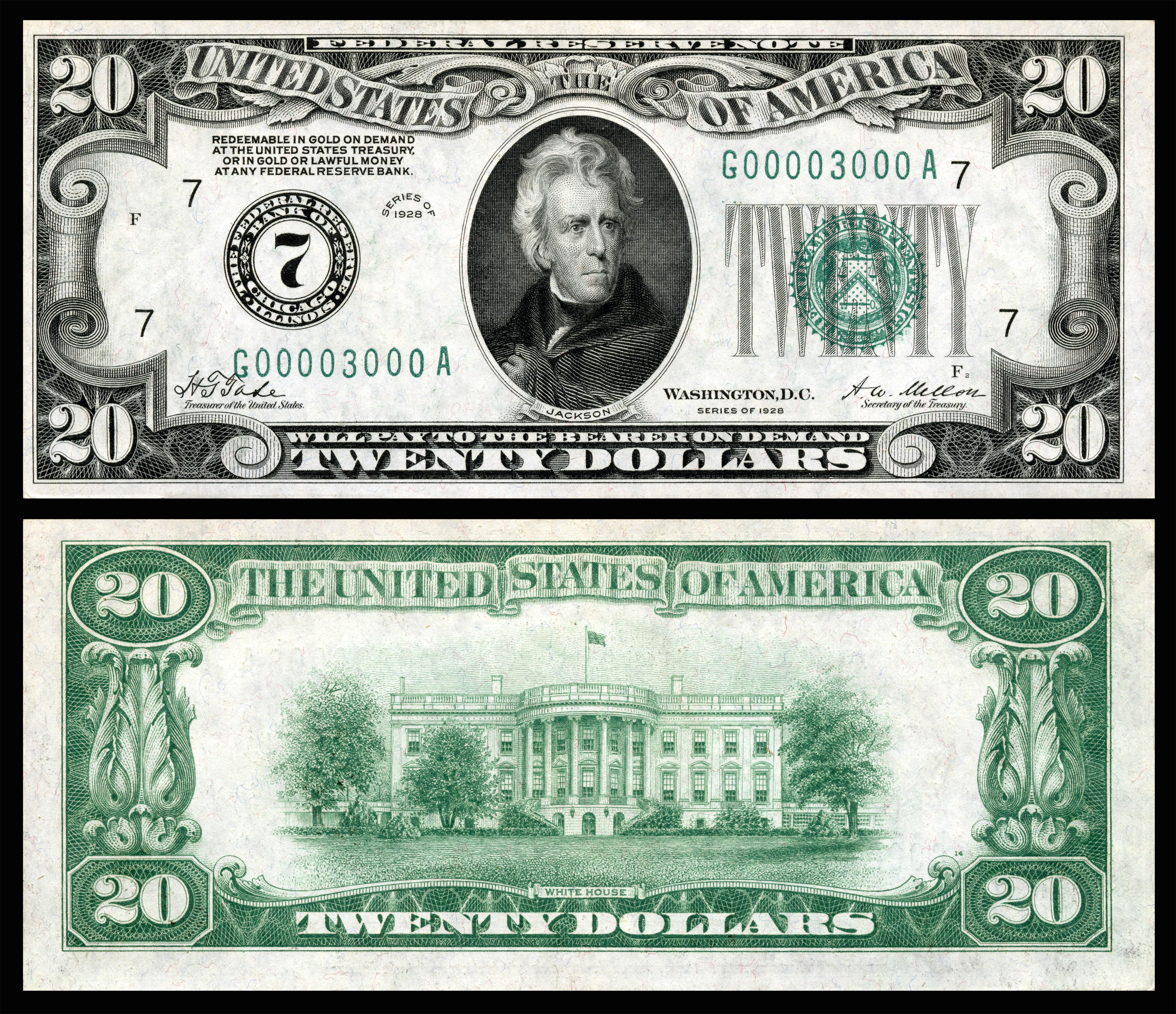
The $20 bill that the Jackson Magnolia is featured on.

According to Sarah Kaplan, a writer for the Washington Post, President Herbert Hoover liked to eat breakfast under the tree. From 1928 to 1998, the Jackson Magnolia was on the back of the $20 bill. In 2006, the Jackson Magnolia was designated a Witness Tree by the National Park Service. The base of the Jackson Magnolia was damaged by the 1994 Cessna airplane crash. President Barack Obama planted a tree grown from the seeds of the Jackson Magnolia in Israeli President Shimon Peres's Jerusalem Garden.

The Jackson Magnolia began to rot in the 1940s. In the 1970s, one of the tree's main limbs was removed and the cap was filled with concrete. First Lady Melania Trump approved the removal of a section of the Jackson Magnolia in 2017, citing concerns about the safety of guests and journalists who stand under the tree. The decision to remove the section of the Jackson Magnolia was based on a report by the U.S. National Arboretum on the tree's condition.

On March 30, 2025, President Donald Trump called the Jackson Magnolia a "safety hazard" on Truth Social. The White House announced that the tree was removed on April 7, 2025. The Jackson Magnolia was replaced with a 12-year-old sapling that is a direct descendant of the Jackson Magnolia. The White House did not allow news media to video the tree planting, but President Trump shared a video clip of White House groundskeeper Dale Haney and himself planting the tree.

== See also ==
- List of individual trees
