= Oxon Cove Park and Oxon Hill Farm =

Historic district in Maryland, United States

- IUCN category V (protected landscape/seascape)
- Location within the United States Location within Maryland
- Location: Prince George's County, Maryland, US and Washington, DC
- Nearest city: Forest Heights, Maryland, Washington, DC
- Coordinates: 38°48′17″N 77°00′43″W
- Established: 1959
- Governing body: National Park Service
- Oxon Cove Park
- U.S. National Register of Historic Places
- U.S. Historic district
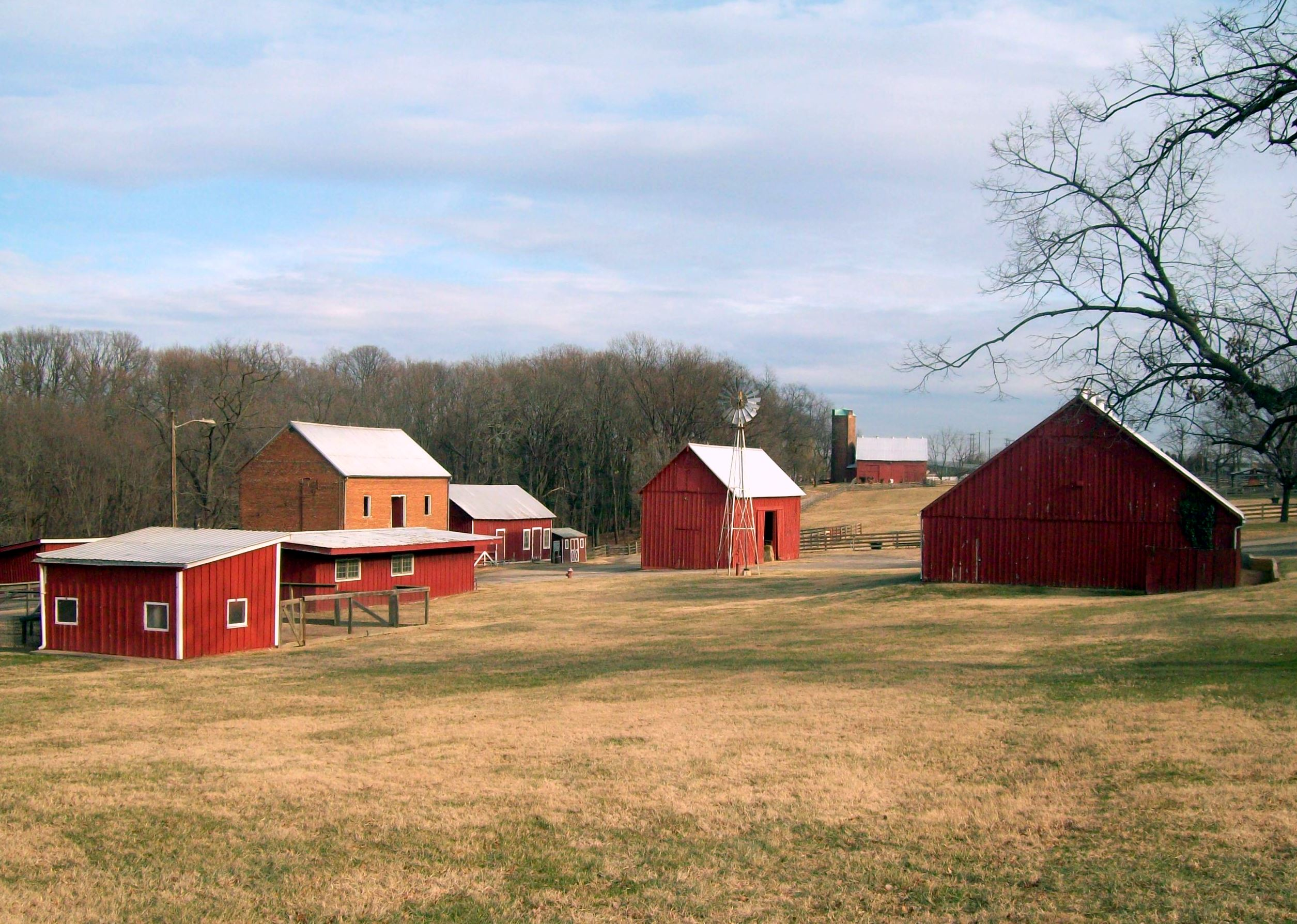
- Oxon Hill Farm, December 2010
- Location: Government Farm Rd., Forest Heights, Maryland
- Area: 289 acres (117 ha)
- Architectural style: Italianate, et al.
- NRHP reference No.: 03000869
- Added to NRHP: September 02, 2003

Oxon Cove Park is a 512 acre large national historic district with portions in Prince George's County, Maryland and Washington, D.C. operated by the National Park Service as part of National Capital Parks-East. It includes a living farm museum, the 289-acre Oxon Cove Farm, located at Oxon Hill in the Maryland portion of the park. The other 222 acres of the site are former landfill.

The park is a resource for environmental studies, wildlife observing, fishing, and other recreational activities made possible by easy access to the Potomac River. Fourteen buildings and two structures are located in the historic district and associated with the property's sequential development as a plantation, an institutional agricultural complex, and a farm museum.

It is bounded by Interstate 295 on the south, Indian Head Highway on the east and the District of Columbia on the north.

The 289 acre farm portion was listed on the National Register of Historic Places in 2003.

== History ==
Before European settlers arrived, the Piscataway Indian people farmed the land along the Potomac River in the area.

=== Mount Welby ===
In 1787, Nicholas Lingan purchased 270 acres of property that included the land where Oxon Hill Manor sits and much of Oxon Hill Farm. And it was likely during his ownership that the Mount Welby house was built.

From the late 17th century to the early 19th century, another part of the farm was owned by John Addison and his descendants who grew tobacco, oats and corn on the land using enslaved people to do so. Part of the estate was known as Oxon Hill Manor at the time.

In 1811, Dr. Samuel DeButts, a native of Sligo, Ireland bought part of the Lingan property and renamed it Mount Welby in honor of his wife's family. He oversaw a diversified farm through the practice of slavery. Ownership of the land passed to his wife when he died in 1815 and their son John Henry when she died in 1826. The land transferred to his children following his 1832 death. His children - who had moved to Fauquier County - sold the land in 1843.

=== Godding Croft ===
During the rest of the 19th century the land changed hands many times until the federal government bought it, and an adjoining 100 acres, in 1891 as a farm, known as Godding Croft, to provide food for patients at nearby St. Elizabeths Hospital.

In 1937 the District of Columbia began using much of the park's land outside of the farm, on both the DC and Maryland sections, as a disposal area and landfill. They filled the site with dredged sediments from Oxon Cove and the Potomac River channel, excess soil and construction materials from the construction of I-295 and the Metrorail system, and sludge/solids from the nearby Blue Plains Wastewater Treatment Plant. Prior to the landfill operations, the northern area consisted of undeveloped wetlands and open water known as Oxon Bay, and the eastern area consisted of agricultural fields and wetlands. Between 1937 and 1963 the cove was modified with fill dirt from multiple sources including soil and construction materials from Interstate 295 construction. Modification of land around the cove continued until 1965 using dredge spoils from the Anacostia River.

Encroaching of the urban environment and increasing cost of labor spelled the end of the farm. The 1938 Fair Labor Standards Act enacted a 40 hour work week that made it hard to afford farm workers. In the 1940's Maryland built Indian Head Highway across the farm. In 1954 the government agreed to sell a 22 acre section that had been cut off by the highway to Prince George's County for a middle school, but then in 1956 it was swapped with the Maryland State Roads Commission for the construction of the Indian Highway/495 interchange.

Following a flood caused by Hurricane Connie in 1955, the U.S. Army Corps of Engineers constructed two concrete drops in 1959—one on the Forest Heights Tributary and one on Oxon Creek—at their confluence.

In 1960, the Department of Health, Education and Welfare began the process of transferring the farm, via the National Planning Commission, to the National Park Service, but retained portions for their own use. Farming ended at Godding Croft in the 1960s.

In 1961, Prince George's County Commissioners agreed to spend $250,000, matched by an equal amount in federal money, to purchase 240 acres of land next to the 300 acre farm, which by then was already owned by the Park Service. The primary motivation for the purchase was to build the extension of the George Washington Memorial Parkway that had been planned to run along the river, but killed twice before in 1958 and 1959, since the 1930's. The parkway, never built, was to run 7.5 miles from the Jones Point Bridge to Fort Washington.

=== Park Service ===
In 1967, the National Park Service arranged with the Department of Health, Education and Welfare to use the farm as a children's animal farm and the remaining land was later transferred to NPS. It was added to lands that NPS purchased to the south in 1961-62 from the estate of William T. Sellner and to 23 acres it acquired in a 1966 swap with Washington DC on the north side of the Cove.

At this time Oxon Cove Park was formed and welcomed its first visitors. For some time it was known as the Oxon Hill Children's Farm.

In 1969, the District transitioned landfilling operations from the Kenilworth Park Landfill to the Oxon Cove Landfill. From October 1969 to June 1972, the District disposed of approximately 1,500,000 tons of municipal waste and 275,000 tons of incinerator ash in the Park. During this time, the District also disposed of sludge generated at the Blue Plains Wastewater Treatment Plant. They stopped using it as landfill, after they were ordered by the courts to stop, in early July 1972.

When the landfill was in operation, commuting bicyclists started using the roads and a causeway built by the landfill contractor to access Washington, DC. When the operations ceased, the cyclists petitioned for a formal multi-use trail to use and as a result the Park Service built one in 1978.

In 1970 NPS commissioned a plan that recommended transforming the landfill and farm into a golf course with 4 holes in DC and 14 in Maryland with a driving range, a children's farm, a youth hostel, day camp, scenic overlook, amphitheater, plant nursery and two marinas. Shortly after the dump was closed NPS began construction of the golf course, which included covering it in a waste, wood chips and grass mixture but it was paused while they considered using part of the DC land to dump sludge compost for the Blue Plains Water Treatment facility. During this time the DC portion of the park was considered for a swamp gas well, a women's prison and an urban farm while the land sat idle. For the gas well, PEPCO went so far as to construct a ventilation building on the site and in 1980 Johns Hopkins University installed Landfill Gas Testing Programs at the old landfill, but this never became operational due to lack of funding.

At some point between 1982 and 1988 the Oxon Farm Trail Bridge, the bridge over Oxon Creek within the park, was removed and replaced with another bridge slightly downstream.

The golf course was never completed and in 1988 NPS created a new plan that recommended creating a turn of the century farm and a community garden in the farm section and converting the landfill to playfields, a DC tree nursery, a fishing pier and boat ramp all accessibly by a new access road and trails and it removed the golf course from the plan.

In the 1990s the Park service built a 3.9 mile paved trail around the cove and connected to DC via a bridge built in the 1980s across Oxon Creek.

In 2002, NPS initiated environmental investigations of the landfill site pursuant to the Comprehensive Environmental Response, Compensation, and Liability Act (CERCLA). The first phase of that investigation indicated that the soil, groundwater, and sediments are impacted by relatively low concentrations of hazardous substances typically found in municipal waste landfills and sludges generated from wastewater treatment plants. In 2024, NPS began the next step of the CERCLA process called the remedial investigation.

In 2015, the town of Forest Heights, MD annexed the Maryland part of the park to connect the town to its publicly owned spaces so it can make better planning decisions.

In 2014, NPS began planning an expansion of the hiker-biker trail at Oxon Cove Park. The proposed plan included constructing a new trail along the north side of Oxon Creek and Oxon Cove, extending from the existing trail in Maryland—between DC Village Lane SW and the bridge over Oxon Creek—to the southern end of Shepherd Parkway SW in Washington, DC. The project also called for an observation deck on the DC side of Oxon Cove, along with a bike rack and a bench. Although a Finding of No Significant Impact (FONSI) was issued in 2017, the project appears to have stalled.

In 2024-25, NPS resurfaced and rehabilitated the trail and replaced a washed-out pedestrian bridge, reconnecting the Forest Heights community with Oxon Cove Park for the first time in years. The project also replaced nine culverts, preventing future runoff and flooding issues; installed or replaced trash cans and benches; removed encroaching vegetation, and planted native trees. The project was funded through President Biden’s Bipartisan Infrastructure Law.

== Oxon Hill Farm ==
The Oxon Hill Farm includes the Mount Welby home, Farm Museum, barns, a stable, feed building, livestock buildings and a visitor activity barn. Farm animals include cows, horses and chickens. Visitors can view the animals up close daily and learn about the workings of a farm. The Farm Museum building displays historical farm equipment dating from the late 19th century.

The district also includes a hexagonal frame outbuilding; c. 1830 brick root cellar; c. 1973 frame hog house; c. 1890 frame horse and pony barn; c. 1991 frame chicken house; c. 1970 steel-frame implement shed; c. 1980 frame visitor barn; c. 1970 steel-frame windmill; c. 1940 frame hay barn; c. 1890 frame feed building; c. 1830 brick stable; c. 1970 frame tool shed; c. 1980 frame "sorghum sirip" shed; and a c. 1980 frame dairy barn, and c. 1940 tile silo. From the 1890s to 1950s, under the ownership of St. Elizabeth's Hospital, the site was used as a therapeutic treatment center for the mentally ill known as Godding Croft. The Oxon Cove Farm historic district is located on the crest of a ridge overlooking the Potomac River, north of I-95 and very close to National Harbor.

== Mount Welby ==
The principal dwelling, known as "Mount Welby", is a c. 1807–1811 two-story three-bay brick structure laid in Flemish bond with Italianate detailing and sheltered by a shed roof, and visible to motorists crossing the interstate Woodrow Wilson Bridge. The house was entrusted to the National Park Service in 1959 in order to protect its resources from increased development.

The house is operated as a historic house museum, with exhibits about period life in the early 19th century for the owners and slaves on the plantation. Other exhibits focus on the home's role at Godding Croft.

== Gallery ==
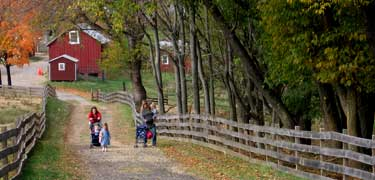
NPS Official "Oxon Hill Farm / Oxon Cove Park Fall View", November 2008

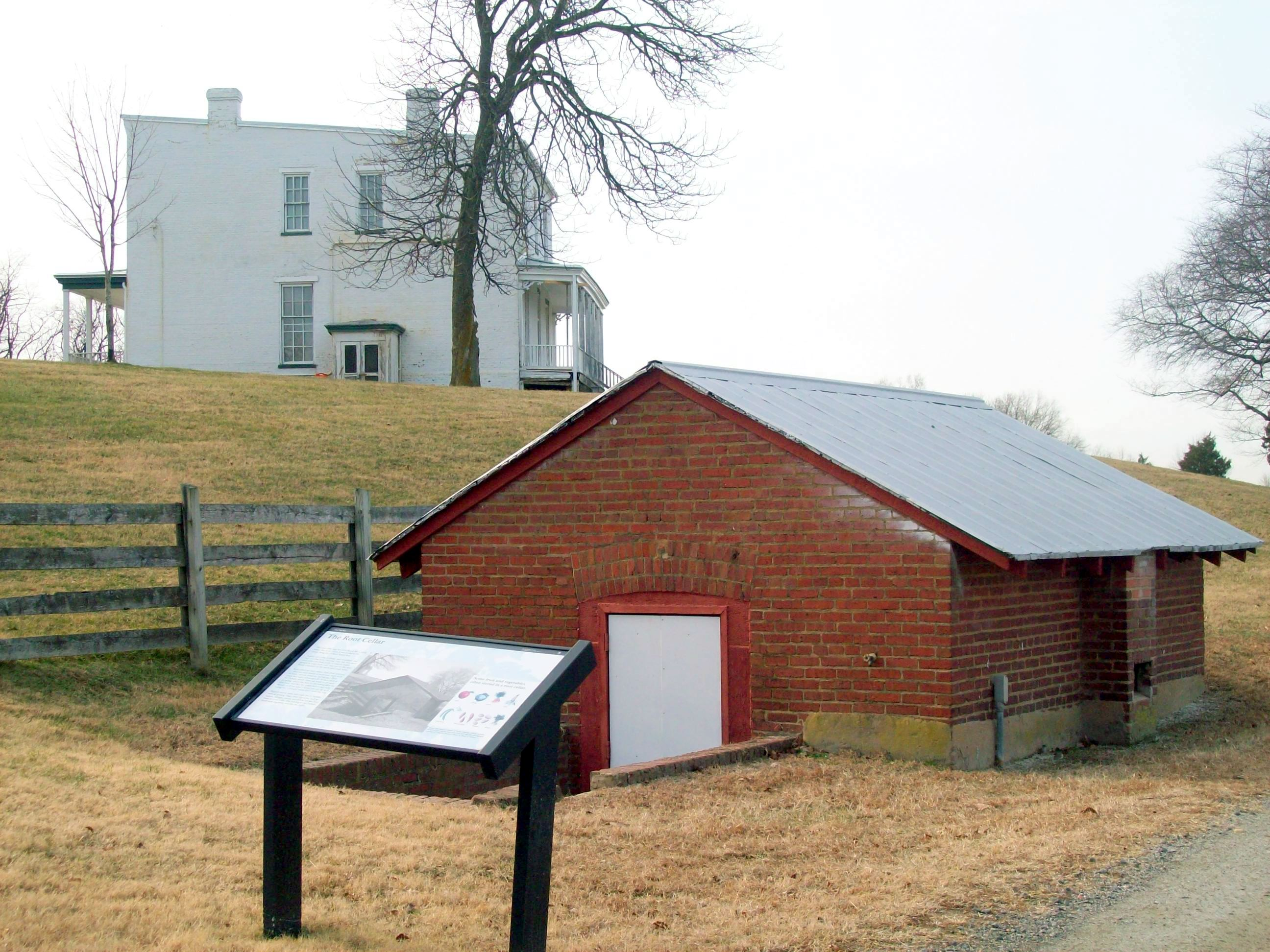
Mt. Welby and Root Cellar, December 2010

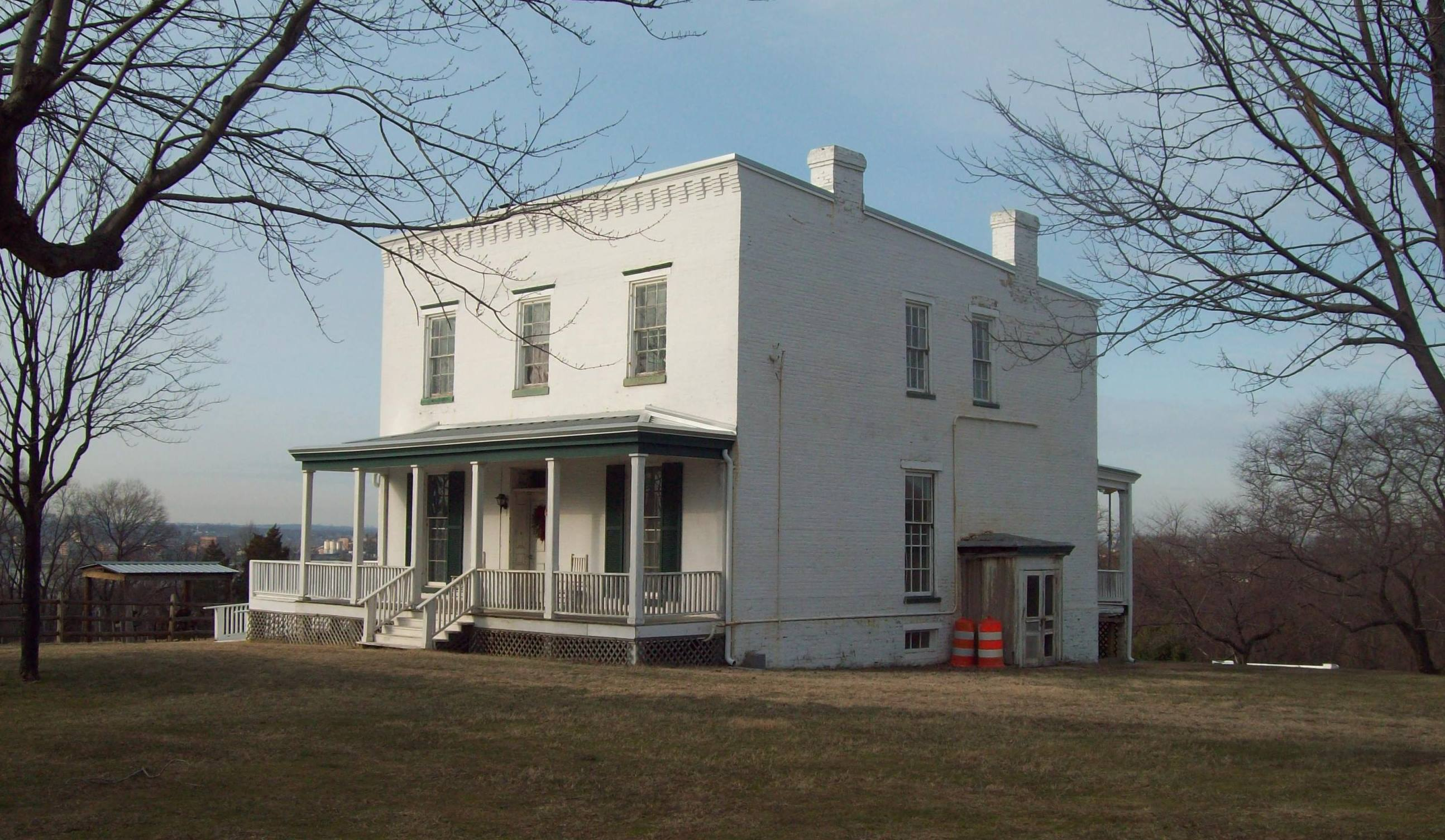
Mt. Welby, December 2010

== See also ==
- Open-air museum
