= St. Ignatius Church (Oxon Hill, Maryland) =

Historic church in Maryland, United States

- U.S. National Register of Historic Places
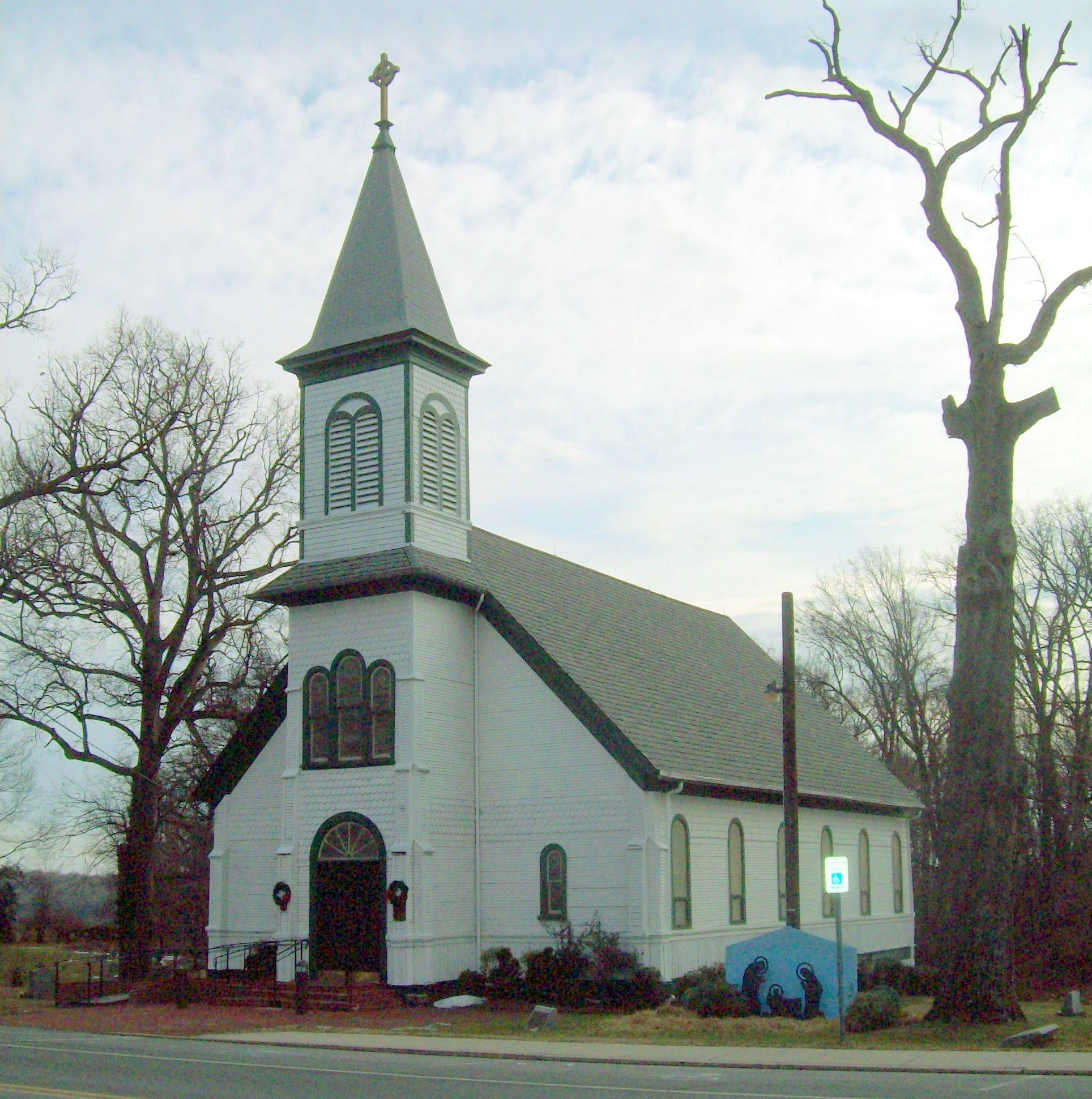
- St. Ignatius Church, December 2010

- Location within Maryland Location within the United States
- Location: 2315 Brinkley Rd., Fort Washington, Maryland 20744 (in Oxon Hill, Maryland)
- Coordinates: 38°48′16″N 76°58′1″W
- Area: 3 acres (1.2 ha)
- Built: 1890–1891
- Architect: Charles Beers
- Architectural style: Queen Anne, Shingle Style
- NRHP reference No.: 74002201
- Added to NRHP: June 27, 1974

St. Ignatius Church is a Catholic church of the Archdiocese of Washington in Oxon Hill, Prince George's County, Maryland.

== Building ==
The historic church structure was constructed between 1890 and 1891. The 1 1/2-story structure is wood frame, with clapboarding, and shingling in imbricated pattern. It is rectangular in form with a gabled roof, 80-foot (24 m) projecting front belfry with spire and louvered openings, round arched openings, and modified corner buttresses. The architectural style is considered Eclectic, with elements of the Shingle and Queen Anne styles.

== History ==
It is the second church on site and has served as a mission and parish church. The original church, built in 1849, was partially funded by Mary Surratt, one of the conspirators involved with the Assassination of Abraham Lincoln. It was later staffed by the Josephites, a religious society serving African Americans.

The present church was listed on the National Register of Historic Places in 1974.

St. Luke's Catholic Church entered into a shared community arrangement at the historic building as of September 2019. Under the agreement between the Archdiocese of Washington and the Personal Ordinariate of the Chair of Saint Peter, the pastor of St. Luke's also serves as administrator of St. Ignatius. The principal Sunday Mass and masses during the week are now celebrated according to the Ordinariate's Anglican Use liturgy with the Divine Worship: The Missal. Masses Saturday evening and early Sunday morning continue to be celebrated in the Ordinary Form of the Roman Missal. Details of the schedule are at the parish websites referenced below.

The exterior of the historic 1891 church was restored in 2023 and 2024, in time for the 175th anniversary of the parish.
