= Frederick Law Olmsted National Historic Site =

National Historic Site of the United States

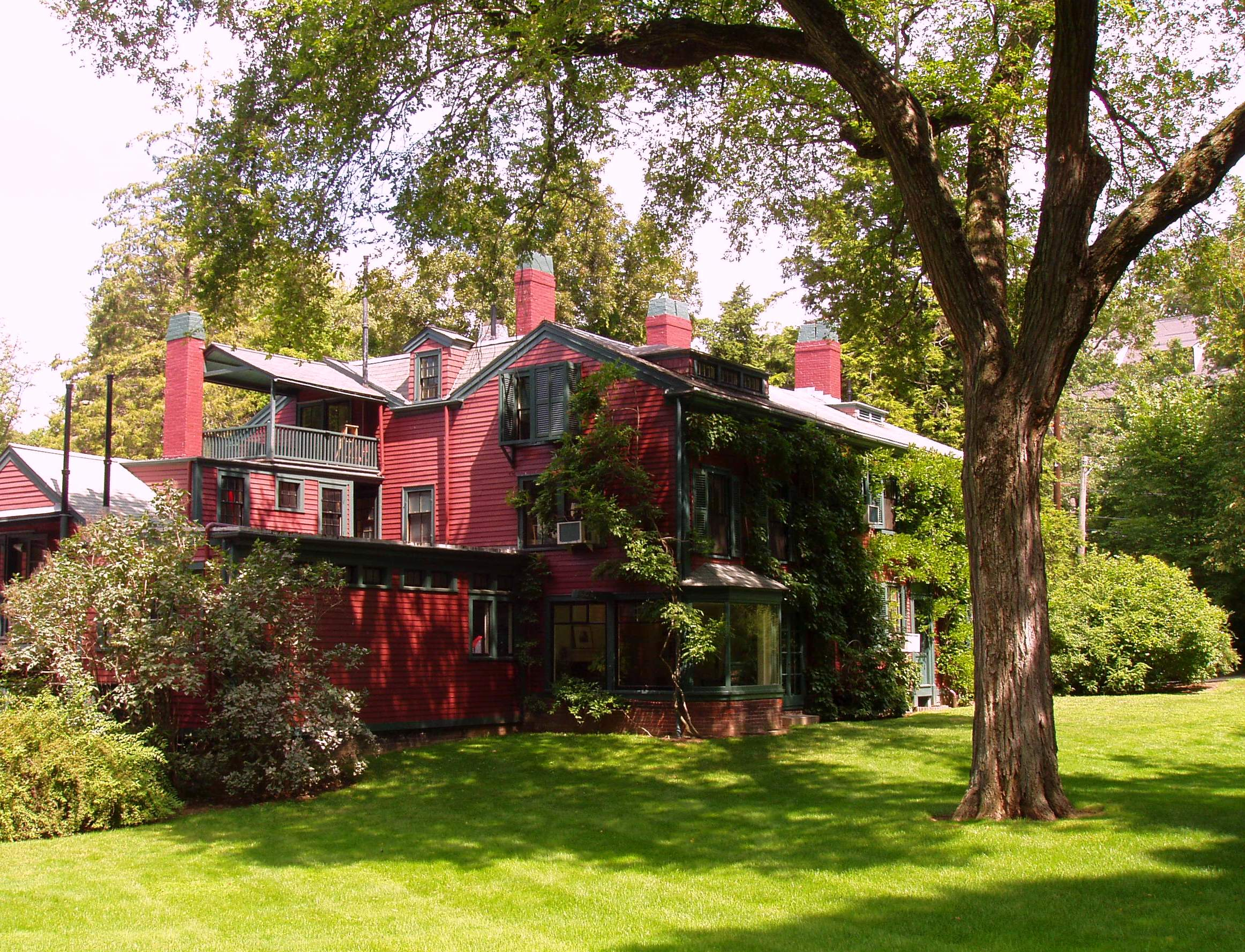

- Location within Massachusetts Location within the United States
- Location: 99 Warren Street, Brookline, Massachusetts, United States
- Nearest city: Boston, Massachusetts
- Coordinates: 42°19′30″N 71°07′56″W
- Area: 7 acres (2.8 ha)
- Established: October 12, 1979
- Visitors: 7,240 (in 2025)
- Governing body: National Park Service
- Website: Frederick Law Olmsted National Historic Site

Frederick Law Olmsted National Historic Site is a United States National Historic Site located in Brookline, Massachusetts, a suburb of Boston. Frederick Law Olmsted (1822–1903) is recognized as the founder of American landscape architecture and the nation's foremost parkmaker of the 19th century. In 1883, Olmsted moved his home to suburban Boston and established "Fairsted", the world's first full-scale professional office for the practice of landscape design. Over the course of the next century, his sons and successors expanded and perpetuated Olmsted's design ideals, philosophy, and influence.

The site is located at 99 Warren Street, in the Green Hill section of Brookline. Olmsted bought the Clark homestead, an 1810 Federal farmhouse, in 1883, to be near his frequent collaborator, H. H. Richardson, whose home and office were nearby. Olmsted and his son John Charles renovated the house, landscaped the property, and relocated the barn closer to the house, and in 1903 added the office wing to the northwest of the main house. Members of the Olmsted family occupied the main house until 1936, when Frederick Law Olmsted Jr. moved to Elkton, Maryland, renting the house to tenants. The offices of the Olmsted Brothers firm continued to be in the wing during this time, although business also declined. Members of the firm reoccupied the house in the 1960s, making substantial alterations to the original landscaping of the property. The property was acquired by the National Park Service in 1980. The grounds have been restored to a c. 1930 appearance, restoring much of Olmsted's landscaping.

Park resources include the restored "Fairsted" historic landscape, and the design office (which remains virtually unchanged from the days when the Olmsted firm's activity was at its height.) Housed within the office complex are nearly 1,000,000 original design records detailing work on many of America's most treasured landscapes, including the grounds of the U. S. Capitol and White House; Great Smoky Mountains and Acadia National Parks; Yosemite Valley; New York's Central Park; and whole park systems in cities such as Buffalo, Seattle, Boston, Louisville and Montreal. The Olmsteds also played an influential role in the creation of the National Park Service, which now owns and maintains the Olmsted site.

Frederick Law Olmsted National Historic Site is open to the public. The Park Service offers guided tours of the grounds and office wing.

== See also ==
- List of National Historic Landmarks in Massachusetts
- National Register of Historic Places listings in Brookline, Massachusetts
