= Samuel DeButts =

American physician

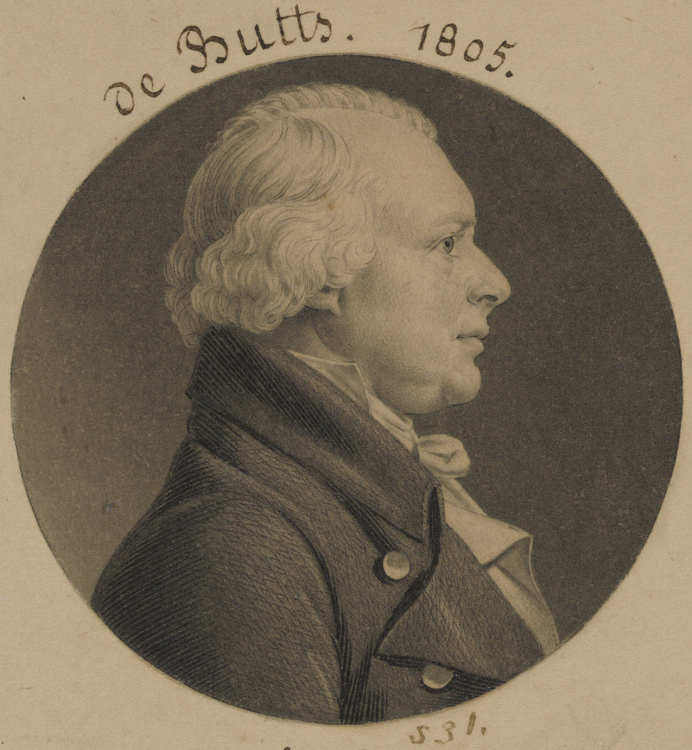
- Born: 1756; Republic of Ireland
- Died: 1814 (aged 57–58)
- Occupation: Medical doctor

Samuel DeButts was a prominent Washington, D.C. area physician in the early 1800s. He acquired his plantation, Mt. Welby, just south of D.C. along the Potomac River in 1811. Today, Mt. Welby is part of the Oxon Cove and Oxon Hill National Park, and the DeButts home is occupied by the park service as the park's offices.

The founder of the University of Maryland School of Medicine, Dr. Elisha De Butts, studied under Samuel Debutts.

DeButts descendants include several prominent Americans, including Harry A. deButts, an executive with the Southern Railway in the 1950s, and John D. deButts, the last CEO of AT&T before its breakup.
