= Elisha De Butts =

American physician

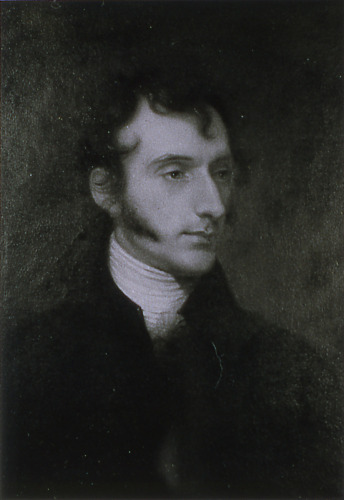
- portrait by Rembrandt Peale
- Born: 1773
- Died: 1831 (aged 57–58)

Elisha DeButts (1773–1831) was an American physician.

DeButts, a physiologist and a founder of the University of Maryland School of Medicine, was born in Dublin, of a family among the "landed gentry," in 1773. His father, John De Butts, was an officer in the English army. In his youth his family emigrated to America and settled at Sharpsburg in Western Maryland. He attended school near Alexandria, where lived his uncle, Dr. Samuel De Butts, under whom he studied medicine. Later he entered Pennsylvania University and took his M. D. in 1805, the subject of his thesis being "An Inaugural Essay on the Eye and on Vision." After practicing for several years on the Potomac, opposite Alexandria, he settled in Baltimore and was appointed professor of chemistry in the College of Medicine of Maryland in 1809, and held it until his death. He also held the same chair in St. Mary's College, Baltimore.

In 1821, DeButts was elected as a member to the American Philosophical Society in Philadelphia.

In 1830 he was sent to Europe by the Board of Trustees to procure chemical apparatus for the University. While abroad he lectured with great éclat before the Royal Institution in London, a copy of his address being requested. He died April 3, 1831, of pneumonia, due to exposure in attending a friend to his door on a cold day in his slippers.

Professor De Butts was tall and spare, his health never robust, and he had a cast in one eye.

Besides his graduating thesis, only two short articles are known: "An Account of an Improvement made on the Differential Thermometer of Mr. Leslie" (1814), Transactions of American Philosophical Society, 1818, pp. 301–306, with plate. "Description of Two New Voltaic Batteries." Silliman's Journal, viii. 1824, pp. 271–274. The Baltimore Federal Gazette mentions a highly important discovery in electricity made by him during the session of 1823-24.

His friend, Bishop Henshaw, of Rhode Island, wrote: "As a teacher of chemistry, whether we look at the learning and perspicuity of the lectures in which he inculcated the lessons and doctrines of philosophy or at the brilliancy and success of the experiments by which he illustrated them, he was perhaps, unequalled, certainly unexcelled."

Dr. De Butts had a son, John De Butts, who became a physician of Queen Anne County, Maryland, and died in 1894. There are said to be several oil portraits of the father extant. One of these is reproduced in Cordell's "History of the University of Maryland," 1891 and 1907.
