= Prince George's County Fire/EMS Department =

Emergency services provider in Maryland, United States

Operational area
- Country: United States
- State: Maryland
- County: Prince George's

Agency overview
- Established: 1971; 55 years ago (historically 1742; 284 years ago)
- Employees: 1,100 volunteer personnel 720 career personnel 80 support personnel
- Staffing: Combination (volunteer and career)
- Fire chief: Thelmetria Michaelides
- EMS level: ALS and BLS
- Motto: Semper Eadem (English: "Ever the Same")

Facilities and equipment
- Battalions: 7
- Stations: 45
- Engines: 80
- Trucks: 19
- Rescues: 9
- Ambulances: 73
- Fireboats: 3

The Prince George's County Fire/EMS Department (PGFD) is a combination career/volunteer county-level agency that provides "..fire prevention, fire protection, emergency medical services, rescue services and community outreach programs" for residents of Prince George's County, Maryland. The department is composed of volunteers from 33 fire companies throughout the county, that are represented by the Prince George's County Volunteer Fire & Rescue Association, as well as career firefighters affiliated with the Prince George's County Professional Firefighters and Paramedics Association, IAFF Local 1619. According to the Firehouse Magazine 2010 Combination Fire Department Run Survey, the Prince George's County Fire/EMS Department covers a response area of approximately 580 miles, protects approximately 900,000 people, and has an annual operating budget of $132 million. Prince George's County Fire/EMS Department responded to 148,506 calls in 2016 according to the 2016 National Run Survey. 29,702 of those calls were fire related and 118,804 that were EMS calls, making Prince George's County Fire/EMS Department the busiest combination fire department in the United States to submit statistics.

== History ==
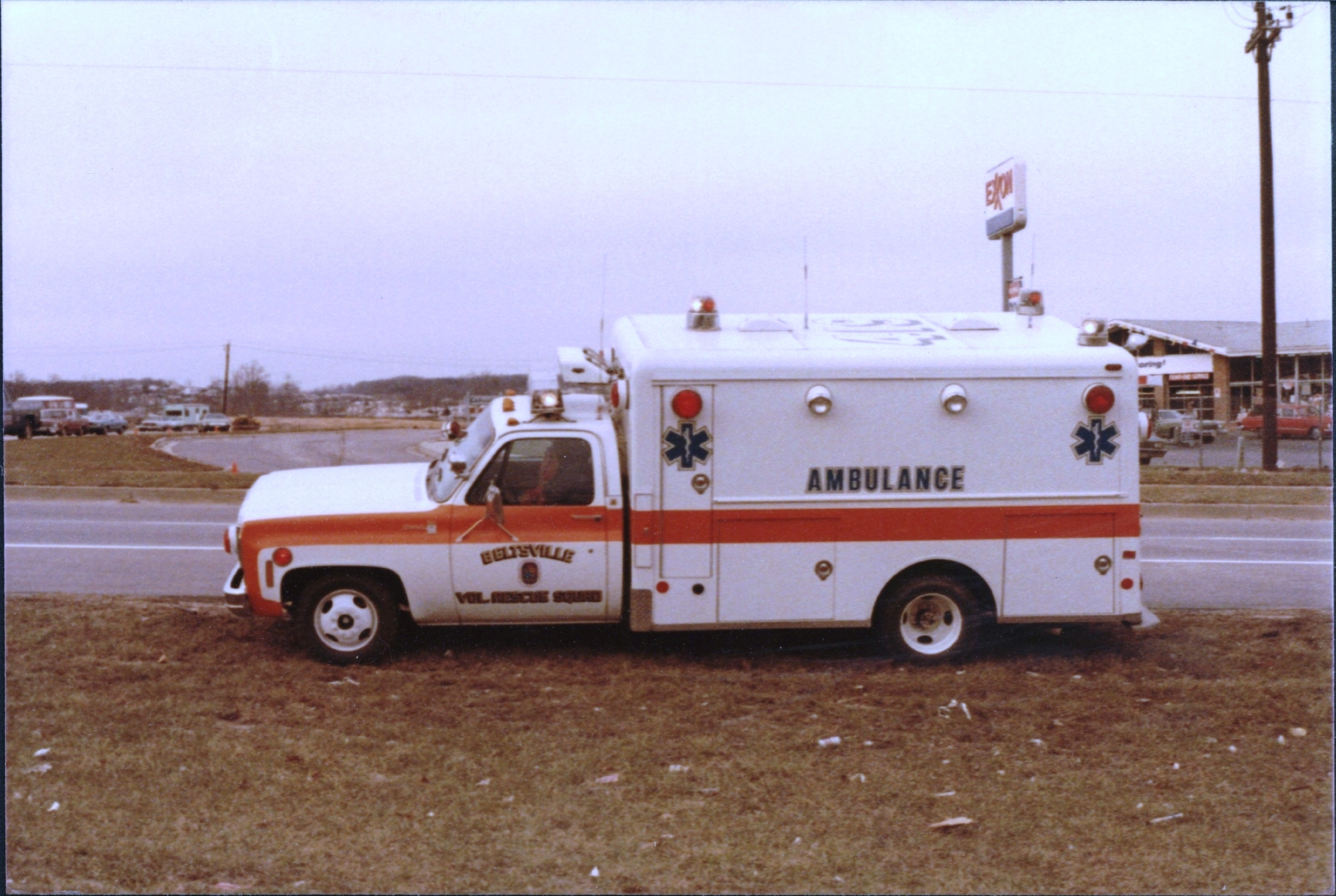
1976 PGFD ambulance in Beltsville

In 1742, the town of Bladensburg became the first governmental entity to pass a fire prevention ordinance. The simple ordinance stipulated that all residential and commercial buildings had to be equipped with a smoke chimney. In 1886, the town of Hyattsville organized the first volunteer fire company in the county. With a donated budget of $27, the fire company bought a two-wheeled hand truck equipped with a barrel, pump, and hose. Two years later, in 1888, the town of Upper Marlboro organized the Marlboro Fire Association following two major town fires. John C. Wyvill had the first fire station built at a cost of $342.

It wasn't until the 1930s that the County organized its fire services at is known today. The University of Maryland created a Fire Service Extension to train firefighters and is widely regarded as a focal point for fire training for departments located east of the Mississippi River.

In 1966 the county incorporated paid firefighters within its volunteer force based on the Yarger Study which stated:

- At least two "paidmen" at each station.
- All paid firefighters should be county employees.
- A unified command structure should be developed under the direction of a County fire chief.
- Fire communications should be consolidated under the County fire chief.

The Department of Fire Protection was created on June 14, 1968 which consumed all other previous fire organizations under a single command.

In May 2009, the PGFD received local media attention following a massive natural gas explosion at a Forestville stripmall. PGFD Captain Robert Rouse (Engine 823) was one of 8 firefighters and 1 gas worker injured during the event.

=== List of fire chiefs ===
- Lawrence R. Woltz
- Frank Briguglio
- M.H. (Jim) Estep
- Steven T. Edwards
- Lemuel A. Roberts
- AD. Bell, Sr.
- Ronald J. Siarnicki
- Ronald D. Blackwell
- Lawrence H. Sedgwick, Jr.
- Eugene A. Jones
- Marc S. Bashoor
- Benjamin Barksdale
- Tiffany Green

== Organization ==
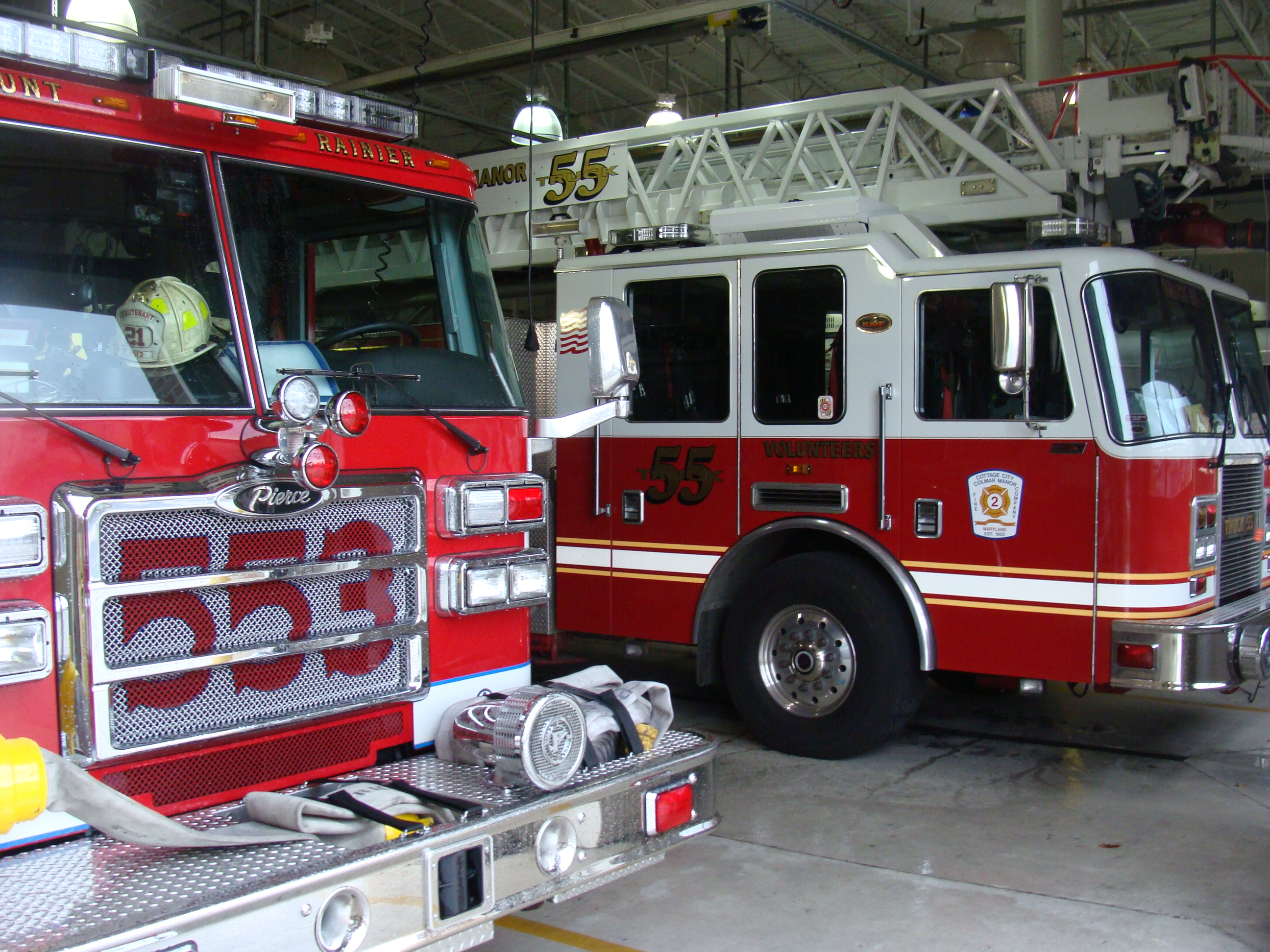
An engine and ladder truck assigned to the Bunker Hill fire station.

The Prince George's County Fire/EMS Department is composed of three divisions, Administrative Services, Emergency Services, and Support Services.

- The Administrative Services command is responsible for the management, financial and support functions within the department including fiscal affairs, research, information management, risk management and human resources.
- The Emergency Services command is responsible for the coordination of career and volunteer firefighters, emergency medical technicians, and special operations personnel to emergency and non-emergency incidents.
- The Support Services command is responsible for specialized non-emergency services including fire prevention, fleet management, logistics, and training.

Each command is headed by a Deputy Fire Chief or Deputy Director who reports directly to the Fire Chief.

== Operations ==
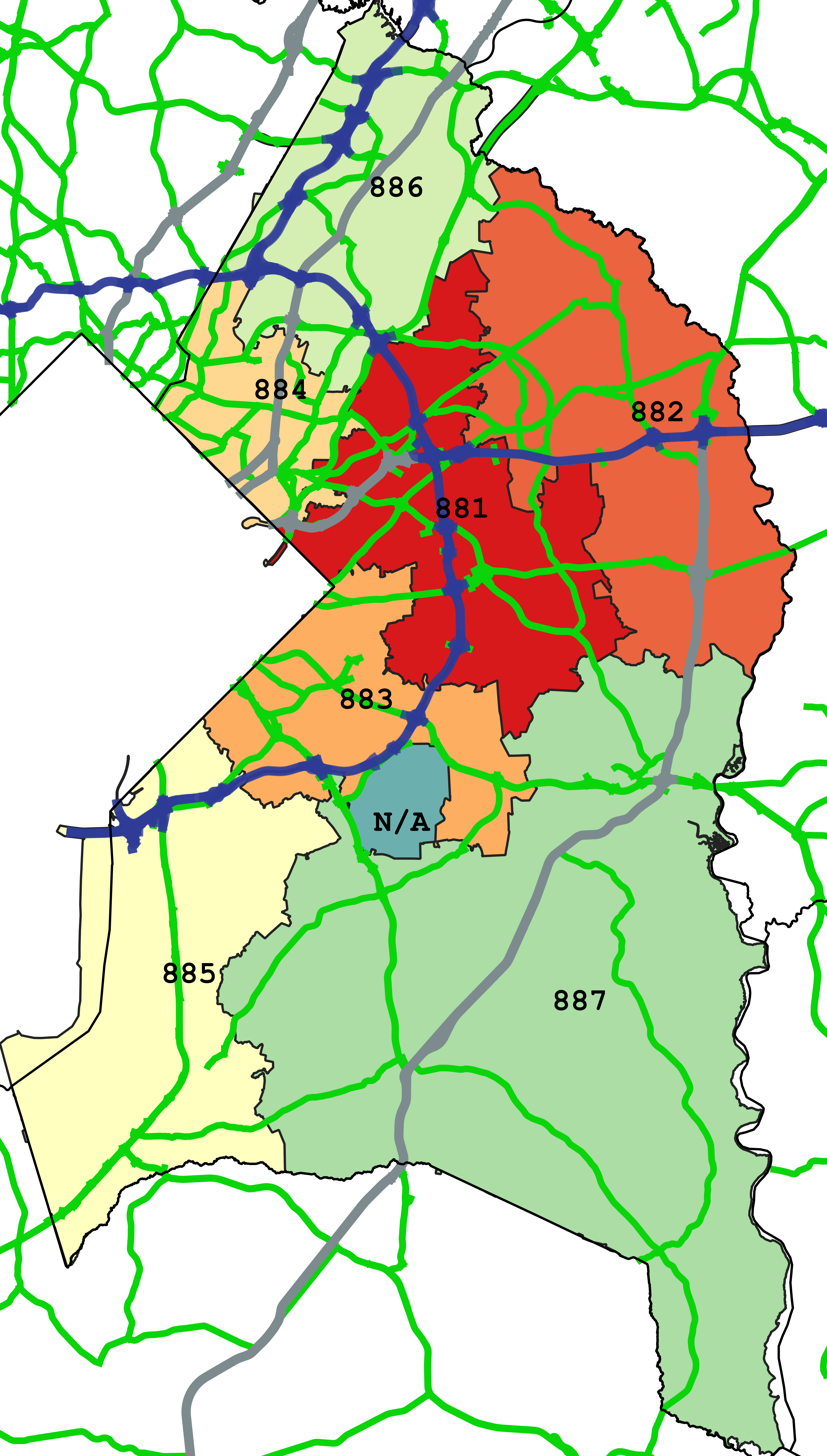
Battalions in Prince George's County

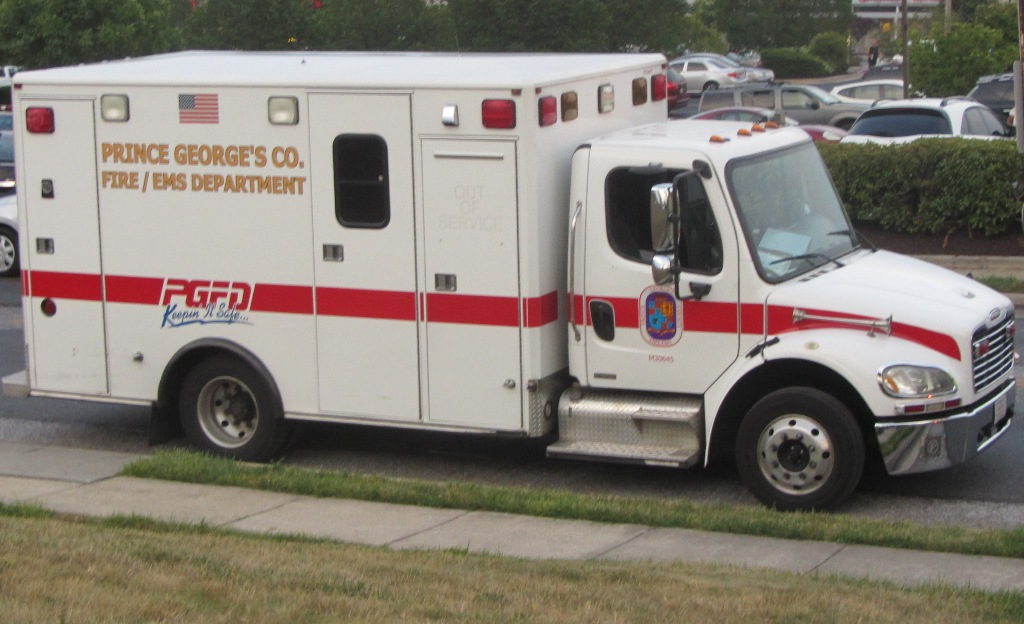
A PGFD EMS Ambulance in 2012

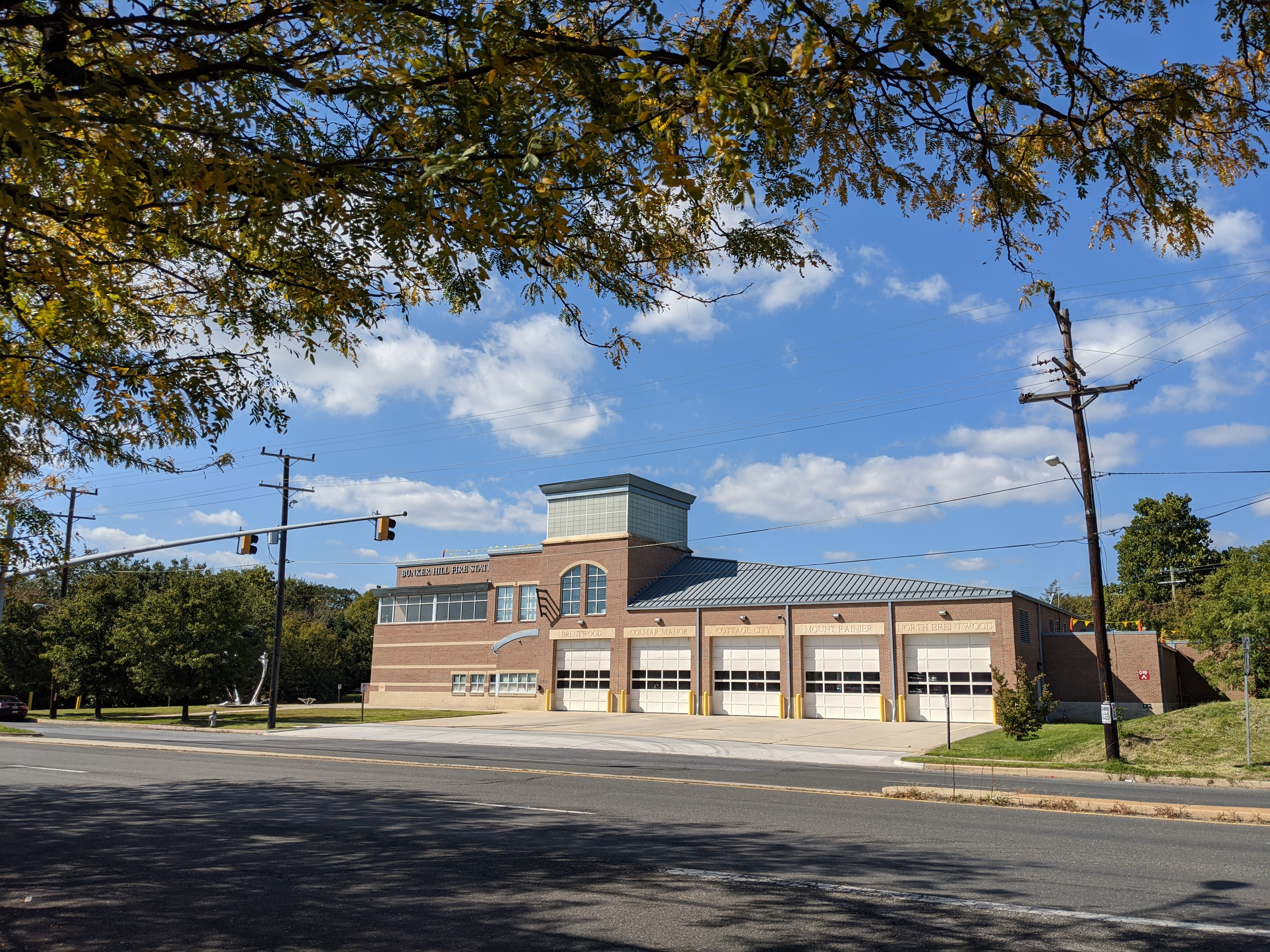
The Brentwood, Maryland fire station

The Emergency Operations Command (EOC) is the largest and most visible resource to the public. The EOC includes daily operations and of all emergency services, both Fire and EMS. The EOC incorporates both sworn career and volunteer Firefighter/EMT's. The EOC is further split into Northern and Southern Divisions. The dividing line between North and South within the fire department is Pennsylvania Avenue or Maryland Route 4. Within each division there are a set of battalions. Battalions 1, 2, 4, and 6 are located in the Northern Division and Battalions 3, 5, and 7 are located within the Southern Division. "The PGFD's busiest service areas are located within Battalions 1, 3, and 5 which includes the area commonly bordered by the District line to the west, Central Avenue to the north, the Capital Beltway to the east, and Allentown Road to the South. These areas represent better than 60% of the PGFD's total calls for service, as they contain the highest population densities."

== Station staffing models ==
Prince George's County is unique compared to some other DC COG jurisdictions in how it staffs its fire stations. Some stations are staffed completely by career personnel, some completely by volunteers, and most are a combination of both.

Most fire stations in Prince George's County have ambulances along with fire suppression pieces such as fire engines, trucks and rescue squads. The only stations with suppression staffing that do not provide EMS transport service are stations 828, (West Lanham Hills,) and station 837, (Ritchie.) When an ambulance is needed in 28 or 37's area the closest ambulance from the surrounding area will be dispatched. Most other volunteer companies that provide suppression staffing also provide ambulance staffing with the exception of station 833 which has completely volunteer provided suppression staffing, with an ambulance staffed 24/7 by career personnel on overtime.

=== Supplemental volunteer staffing ===
Many stations are staffed with 24/7 career personnel, with volunteers who can provide additional staffing on apparatus or place additional units in service.

The level of staffing provided by each volunteer corporation varies. Some volunteer owned stations have 24/7 career staffing and have not placed a volunteer staffed unit in service in years, while other volunteer corporations provide 24/7 volunteer staffing and respond to thousands of call for service every year.

Unit production and accountability is dictated by PGFD General Order 6-29. For stations that are staffed solely by volunteers, if there are less than two qualified volunteers at the station no apparatus will be dispatched from that station. The closest appropriate apparatus will be dispatched from the surrounding area for any calls for service in that station's first due. If two qualified volunteers arrive at an out of service station they may place the station at "Dedicated EMS only staffing," which would allow an ambulance from that station to be dispatched for calls for service.
