= John D. deButts =

American businessman (1915–1986)

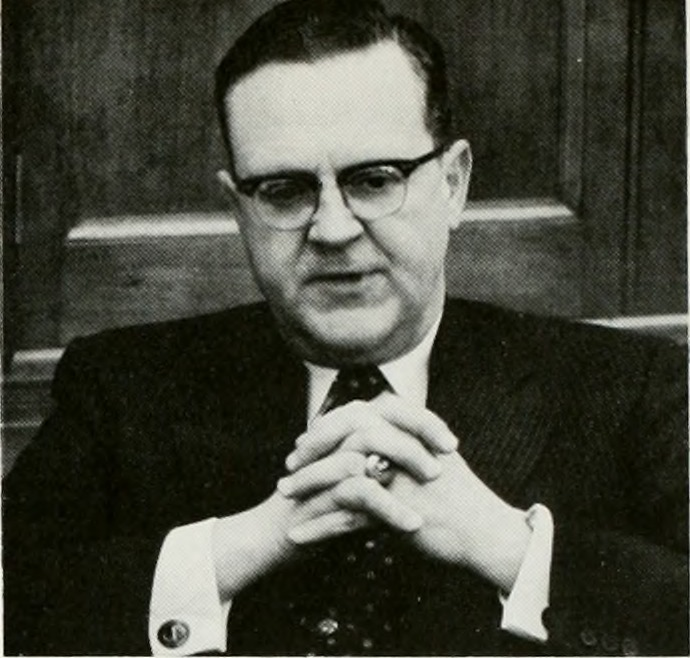
- deButts in 1972
- Born: April 10, 1915; Greensboro, North Carolina, U.S.
- Died: December 18, 1986 (aged 71); Winchester, Virginia, U.S.
- Occupations: Chairman & CEO at AT&T (1972–1979)

John Dulany deButts (April 10, 1915 – December 18, 1986) was an American businessman. He was the chairman and chief executive officer of AT&T from 1972 to 1979.

== Biography ==
After graduating from high school, he enrolled in the Virginia Military Institute in Lexington, where he studied electrical engineering. He received a bachelor's degree in 1936. He was president of Illinois Bell. From 1972 to 1979, he was chairman and CEO of AT&T. He objected to the United States federal government's antitrust efforts to break up AT&T. In 1984, he was dismayed by the decision to break up the Bell System's twenty-three operating companies.

In 1976, deButts received the Golden Plate Award of the American Academy of Achievement.

He w as chairman of The Business Council from 1977 to 1978.

He resided in a family farm in Upperville, Virginia. He died of a heart attack in Winchester, Virginia, on December 18, 1986.
