= Park Hall, St. Mary's County, Maryland =

Park Hall
- Unincorporated community
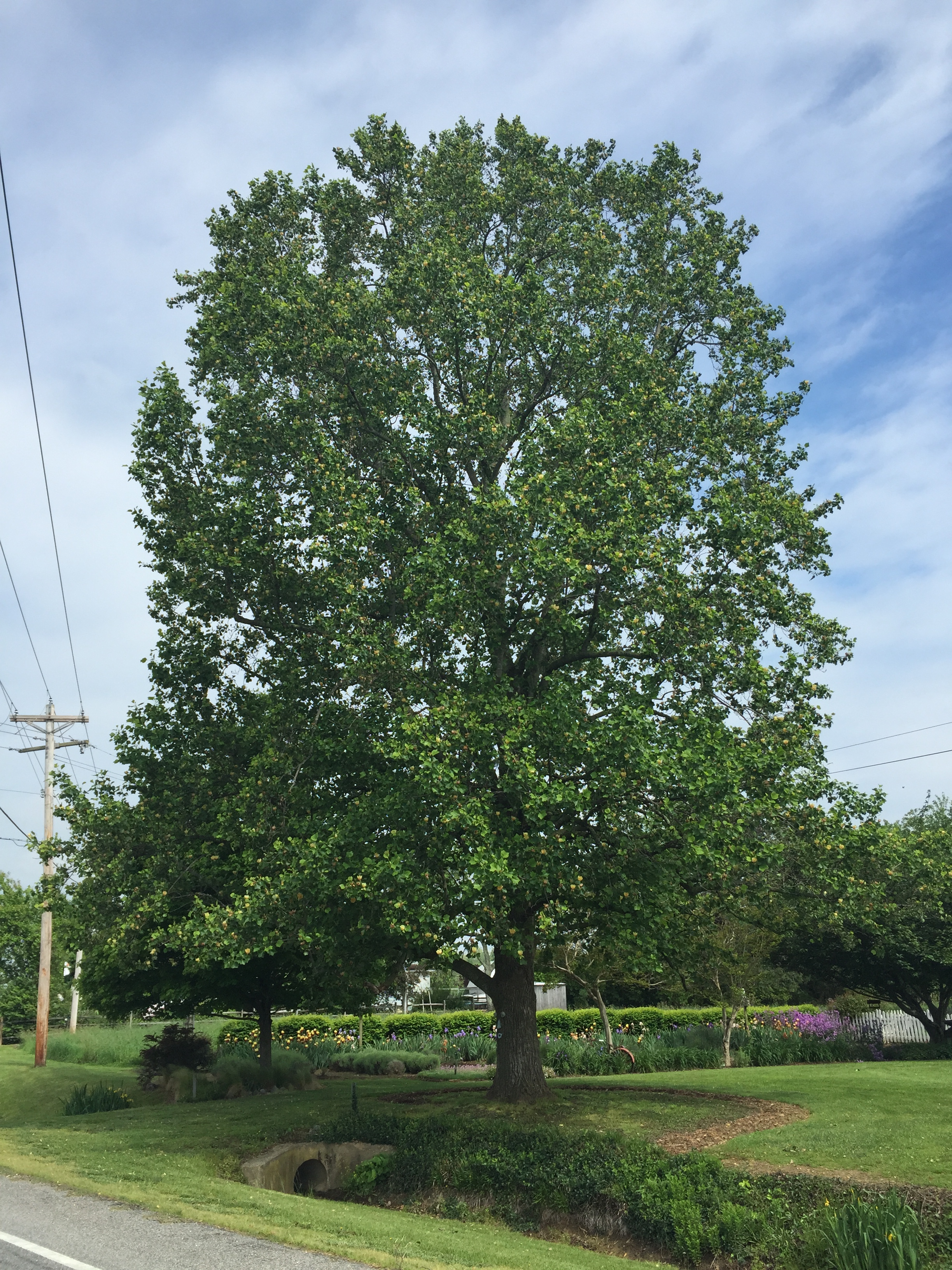
- A tulip tree in bloom along Park Hall Road in Park Hall

- Location within Maryland Location within the United States
- Coordinates: 38°13′10″N 76°25′48″W
- Country: United States
- State: Maryland
- County: St. Mary's County
- Time zone: UTC-5 (Eastern (EST))
  - Summer (DST): UTC-4 (EDT)
- ZIP code: 20667
- Area codes: 301, 240, 227
- GNIS feature ID: 2832426

Park Hall is an unincorporated community in St. Mary's County, Maryland, United States. Originally surveyed in 1640, it is one of the oldest communities in Maryland.

Park Hall has its own post office and its ZIP code is 20667.

== History ==
Park Hall, which was first surveyed in 1640 by Thomas Gerrard, is Maryland's second oldest community after the nearby St. Mary's City, which was established in 1634 as the Maryland Colony was formed. The name of Park Hall is derived from Gerrard's residence, Porke Hall Freehold.

== Geography ==
Park Hill is located just north of St. Mary's City and the St. Marys River, and is approximately 3 mi (4.8 km) south of Lexington Park.

== Transportation ==
=== Air ===
The Park Hall Airport opened in the community in 1964 as a grass airstrip, but it eventually closed in the 1980s and the land was eventually redeveloped as the Fox Meadow single-family residential development, with a street paved directly over the former airstrip. The airport is commemorated by the development with its streets named after aircraft (Piper Court and Spitfire Court) and the airport's owner's surname (Dixon Court). The current nearest public airport is St. Mary's County Regional Airport located in California.

=== Highways ===
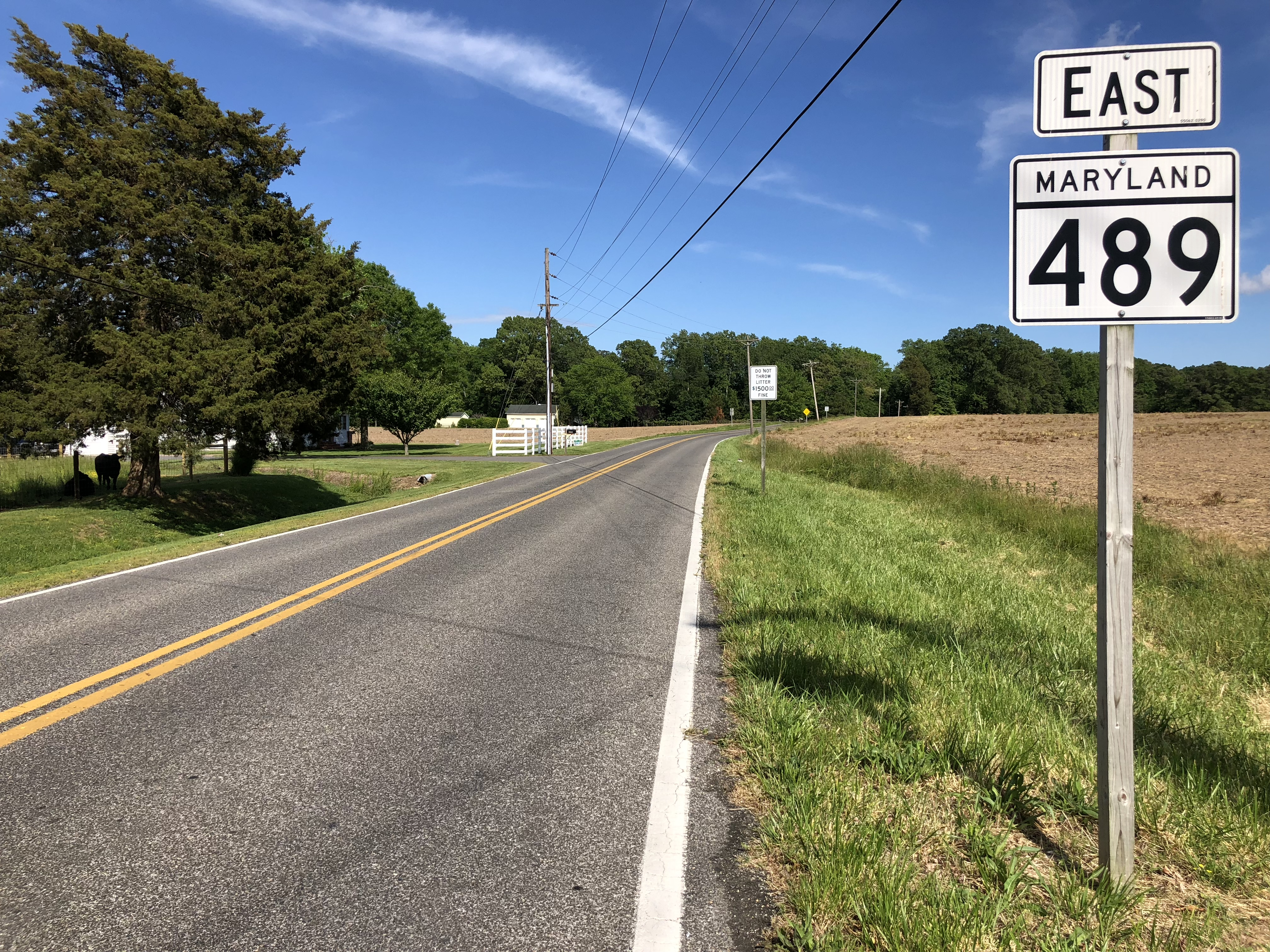
Maryland Route 489 in Park Hall

Park Hall is located at the junction of Maryland Route 5 (MD 5), which runs north to Washington, D.C. border and south to Point Lookout, and MD 489, which links the community to MD 235 in the east.

== Education ==
Park Hall is within the St. Mary's County Public Schools district. Park Hall Elementary School is located in the community, with Great Mills High School and St. Mary's College of Maryland located nearby.
