= Maryland Route 944 =

State highway in Maryland, United States

Maryland Route 944
- Mervell Dean Road

Route information
- Maintained by MDSHA
- Length: 2.26 mi (3.64 km)
- Existed: 1985–present

Major junctions
- South end: Mervell Dean Road near California
- North end: MD 235 in Hollywood

Location
- Country: United States
- State: Maryland
- Counties: St. Mary's

Highway system
- Maryland highway system; Interstate; US; State; Scenic Byways
← MD 943	→ MD 945

Maryland Route 944 (MD 944) is a state highway in the U.S. state of Maryland. Known as Mervell Dean Road, the state highway runs 2.26 miles (3.64 km) from the beginning of state maintenance near California north to MD 235 in Hollywood in St. Mary's County. MD 944 is part of the old alignment of MD 235 between California and Hollywood. The state highway was designated in the mid 1980s following the relocation of MD 235 for its expansion to a four-lane divided highway.

== Route description ==
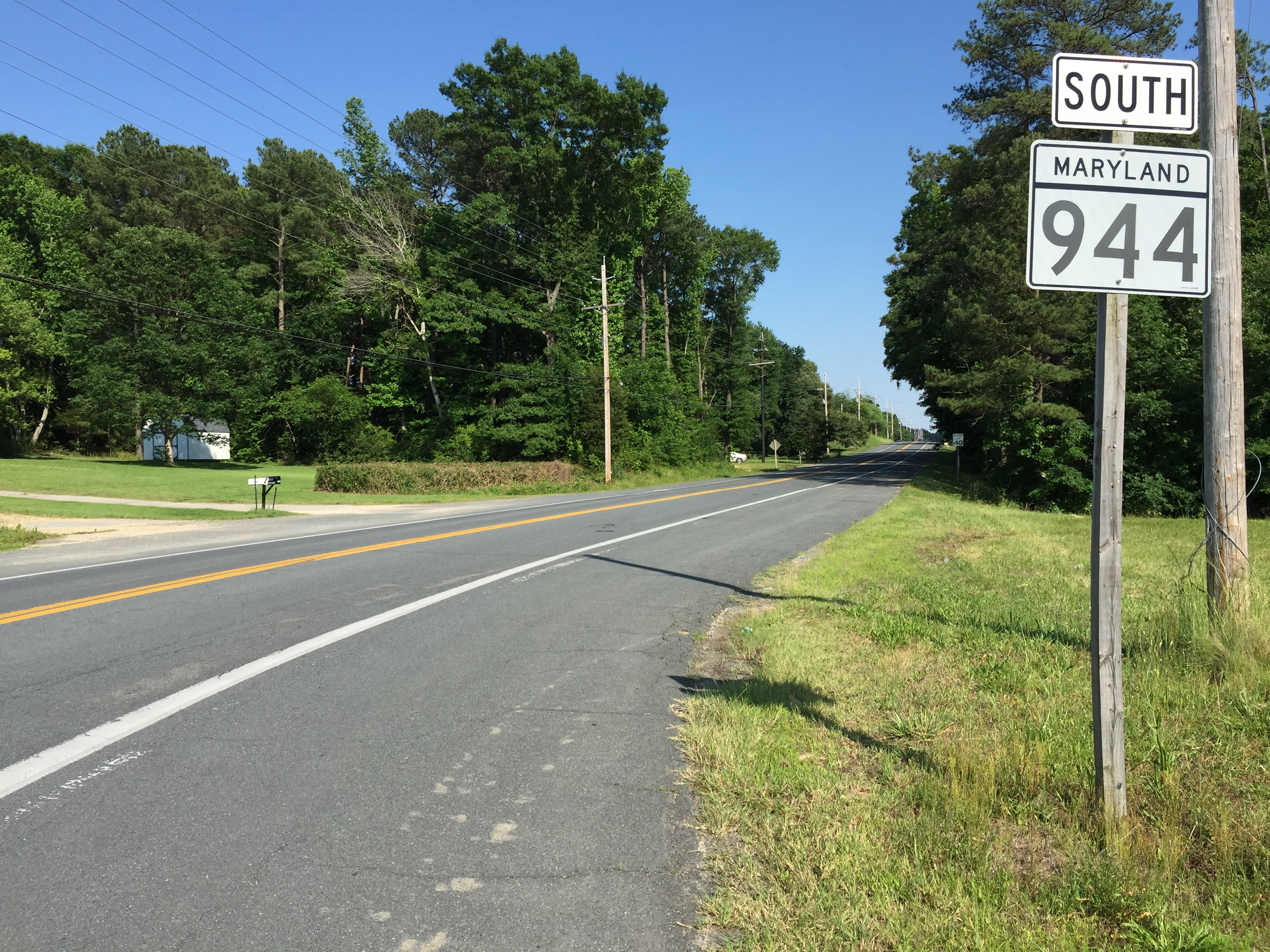
View south at the north end of MD 944 at MD 235 in Hollywood

MD 944 begins at an arbitrary point 0.20 miles (0.32 km) south of Airport View Drive near California. Mervell Dean Road continues south as a county highway to an intersection with MD 235 (Three Notch Road) opposite Airport Road, which leads to St. Mary's County Regional Airport. MD 944 heads north as a two-lane undivided road parallel to the northbound side of MD 235. The state highway intersects Clarkes Landing Road and Joy Chapel Road, both of which are county highways that lead to waterfront subdivisions near the Patuxent River. MD 944 intersects Old Three Notch Road, an older section of MD 235, before reaching its northern terminus at MD 235 in Hollywood.

== History ==
MD 944 is the old alignment of MD 235 between California and Hollywood. The highway between its southern terminus and Old Three Notch Road in Hollywood was part of the original alignment of MD 235 upgraded as a gravel road between 1930 and 1933. The highway between Old Three Notch Road and modern MD 235 was originally constructed as part of MD 235's reconstruction as a military access highway to connect Washington and Naval Air Station Patuxent River in 1943 and 1944. MD 235 was relocated to its present alignment in 1985 as part of the project to expand the final segment of MD 235 between Lexington Park and MD 5 in Oraville to a four-lane divided highway. The bypassed highway was renamed as a northward extension of Mervell Dean Road—itself a section of old alignment of MD 235 bypassed when the original highway was reconstructed during World War II—and designated MD 944.

== Junction list ==
The entire route is in St. Mary's County.

Location	mi	km	Destinations	Notes
California	0.00	0.00	Mervell Dean Road south	Southern terminus
California	0.40	0.64	Clarkes Landing Road to MD 235	Clarkes Landing Road west is unsigned MD 944C; Clarkes Landing Road east is former MD 574
Hollywood	2.00	3.22	Old Three Notch Road north	Old alignment of MD 235
Hollywood	2.26	3.64	MD 235 (Three Notch Road) – Waldorf, Lexington Park	Northern terminus
1.000 mi = 1.609 km; 1.000 km = 0.621 mi

== Auxiliary routes ==
MD 944 has six unsigned auxiliary routes that are state-maintained portions of county highways displaced by the construction of MD 235's present alignment between California and Hollywood.

- MD 944A is the designation for a 0.18-mile (0.29 km) section of St. John's Road and Beck Road in Hollywood. St. John's Road lies to the west of MD 235 and Beck Road lies to the east of the divided highway.
- MD 944B is the designation for a 0.02-mile (0.032 km) section of Sandy Bottom Road adjacent to its intersection with the southbound lanes of MD 235.
- MD 944C is the designation for the 0.04-mile (0.064 km) section of Clarkes Landing Road between MD 235 and MD 944. Clarkes Landing Road east of MD 944 is former MD 574.
- MD 944D is the designation for a 0.06-mile (0.097 km) section of Airport View Road from just west of MD 235 east to MD 944.
- MD 944E is the designation for a 0.02-mile (0.032 km) section of Miles Village Drive adjacent to its intersection with the southbound lanes of MD 235.
- MD 944F is the designation for a 0.02-mile (0.032 km) section of Airport Road adjacent to its intersection with MD 235 and the county-maintained portion of Mervell Dean Road on the opposite side of the intersection. Airport Road leads to St. Mary's County Regional Airport.
