= Maryland Route 246 =

State highway in Maryland, United States

Maryland Route 246
- Maryland Route 246 highlighted in red

Route information
- Maintained by MDSHA
- Length: 3.35 mi (5.39 km)
- Existed: 1927–present

Major junctions
- West end: MD 5 at Great Mills
- MD 237 near Lexington Park; MD 235 in Lexington Park
- East end: Entrance to NAS Patuxent River in Lexington Park

Location
- Country: United States
- State: Maryland
- Counties: St. Mary's

Highway system
- Maryland highway system; Interstate; US; State; Scenic Byways
← MD 245	→ MD 247

Maryland Route 246 (MD 246) is a state highway in the U.S. state of Maryland. Known for most of its length as Great Mills Road, the state highway runs 3.35 miles (5.39 km) from MD 5 in Great Mills east to the entrance to Naval Air Station Patuxent River (NAS Patuxent River) just east of the highway's intersection with MD 235 in Lexington Park. In conjunction with MD 5, MD 246 connects NAS Patuxent River and the suburban area surrounding the military base with Leonardtown. The state highway was originally constructed around 1920. MD 246 extended east onto land now occupied by NAS Patuxent River to serve a ferry from St. Mary's County to the southern end of Calvert County. The ferry was discontinued and the state highway's eastern terminus was rolled back to MD 235 when NAS Patuxent River was constructed during World War II; the remainder of MD 246 was upgraded as a military access project. MD 246 was expanded to a multi-lane highway in the 1990s.

== Route description ==
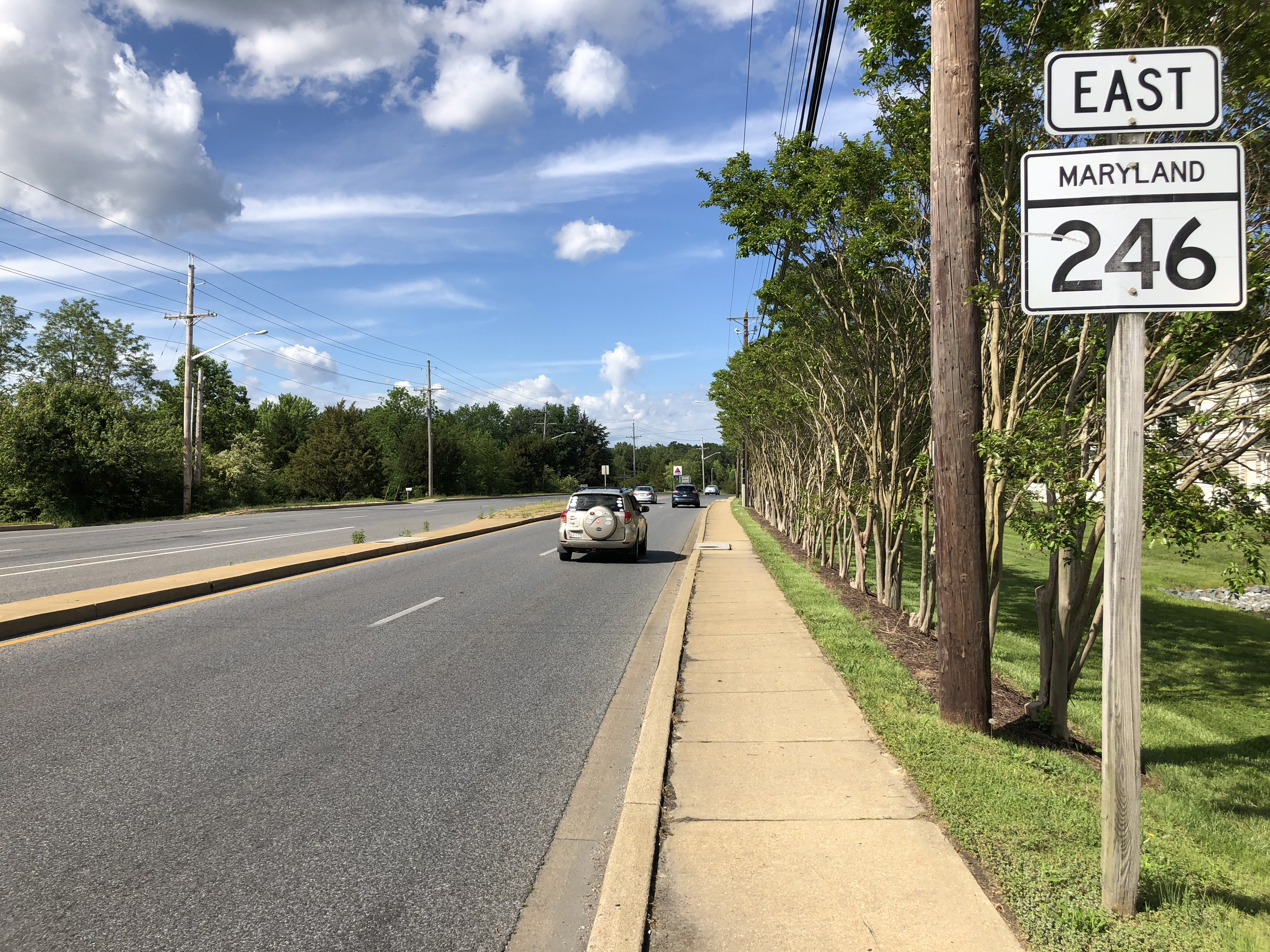
View east along MD 246 at MD 237 near Great Mills

MD 246 begins as Great Mills Road at an intersection with MD 5 (Point Lookout Road) in Great Mills. The state highway intersects its old alignment, which is named Old Great Mills Road and designated MD 5A, before curving northeast as a five-lane road with a center left-turn lane. MD 246 passes to the west of Great Mills High School before meeting the southern end of MD 237 (Chancellors Run Road) and entering the suburban community of Lexington Park, where the highway is lined with residential subdivisions, apartment complexes, office parks, and shopping centers. MD 246 intersects FDR Boulevard and Shangri La Drive before reaching MD 235 (Three Notch Road). Immediately east of the MD 235 intersection, MD 246 becomes Cedar Point Road and reaches its eastern terminus at the main entrance to NAS Patuxent River.

MD 246 is part of the main National Highway System from MD 235 to its eastern terminus at the naval air station. The highway is also a National Highway System principal arterial between MD 5 and MD 235.

== History ==
MD 246 was constructed as a gravel road by 1921. The state highway originally extended east onto the Cedar Point peninsula from its present terminus in Lexington Park (previously known as Jarboesville) to the hamlet of Pearson's Corner, then north to Millstone Landing. Millstone Landing was the location of a ferry across the Patuxent River to the southern terminus of MD 2 in Solomons in Calvert County between 1933 and at least 1940. The highway connecting Pearson's Corner with Cedar Point, which was designated MD 248, was constructed in two sections. The first section from Pearson's Corner was constructed as a gravel road in 1925 and 1926. The second section to a point near the Cedar Point Golf Course was completed around 1930.

Following the entry of the U.S. into World War II, the U.S. Navy seized much of the Cedar Point peninsula to construct NAS Patuxent River in 1942. All of MD 248 and the portion of MD 246 on the military base were removed from the state highway system. The roads on which MD 246 was formerly assigned still exist within the military property, while MD 248 was mostly obliterated by the construction of runways. The remainder of MD 246 from the naval air station to Great Mills was reconstructed with a bituminous concrete surface in 1944 to better connect the military base with Leonardtown. The state highway was reconstructed again from Great Mills to Lexington Park in 1954 and 1955. MD 246 was expanded to a five-lane road between Forest Run Drive and MD 235 by 1993. The remainder of the highway to Great Mills was widened to a five-lane road by 1999.

== Junction list ==
The entire route is in St. Mary's County.

Location	mi	km	Destinations	Notes
Great Mills	0.00	0.00	MD 5 (Point Lookout Road) – Leonardtown, St. Mary's City	Western terminus
Lexington Park	0.97	1.56	MD 237 north (Chancellors Run Road) – California	Southern terminus of MD 237
Lexington Park	3.26	5.25	MD 235 (Three Notch Road) – Point Lookout, Waldorf	
Lexington Park	3.35	5.39	Entrance to Naval Air Station Patuxent River	Eastern terminus
1.000 mi = 1.609 km; 1.000 km = 0.621 mi
