= Maryland Route 237 =

State highway in Maryland, United States

Maryland Route 237
- Chancellors Run Road
- Maryland Route 237 highlighted in red

Route information
- Maintained by MDSHA
- Length: 2.95 mi (4.75 km)
- Existed: 1987–present

Major junctions
- South end: MD 246 near Lexington Park
- North end: MD 235 in California

Location
- Country: United States
- State: Maryland
- Counties: St. Mary's

Highway system
- Maryland highway system; Interstate; US; State; Scenic Byways
← MD 236	→ MD 238

Maryland Route 237 (MD 237) is a state highway in the U.S. state of Maryland. Known as Chancellors Run Road, the route runs 2.95 miles (4.75 km) from MD 246 near Lexington Park north to MD 235 in California in St. Mary's County. MD 237, which was designated in the mid-1980s, bypasses the center of Lexington Park through the suburban area surrounding Naval Air Station Patuxent River (NAS Patuxent River). The state highway was expanded to a four-lane divided highway between 2008 and 2010 in response to increased activity at the military base.

== Route description ==
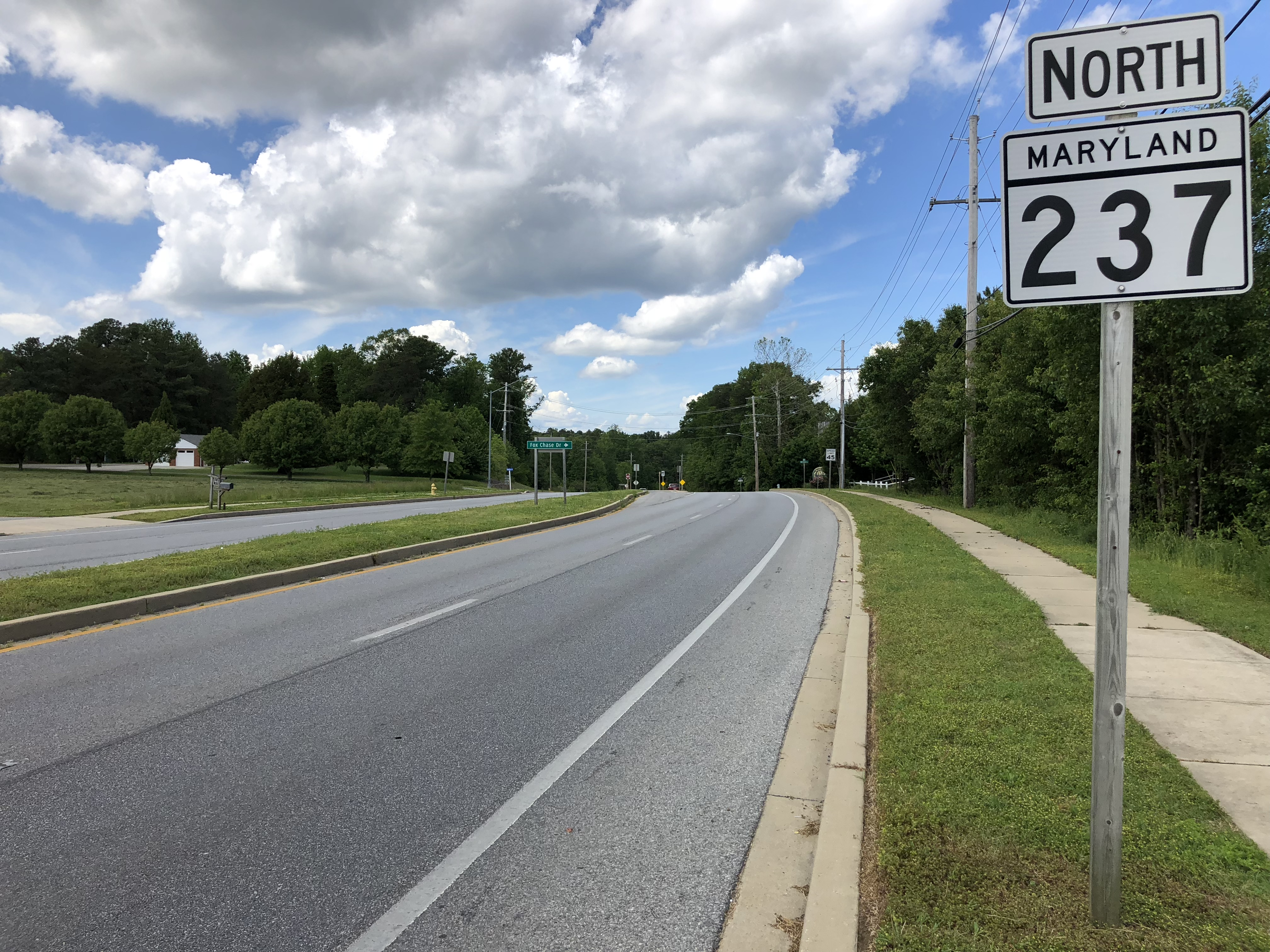
View north along MD 237 at Pegg Road near Great Mills

MD 237 begins west of Lexington Park at an intersection with MD 246 (Great Mills Road), which heads east to NAS Patuxent River, north of Great Mills High School. The state highway heads north as a four-lane road with a center left-turn lane between residential subdivisions. At Pegg Road, MD 237 becomes a four-lane divided highway. The state highway crosses Jarboesville Run in a forested area before continuing between residential subdivisions. MD 237 passes east of Chancellors Run Regional Park and crosses the Three Notch Trail before reaching its northern terminus at MD 235 (Three Notch Road) in California.

== History ==
The original MD 237 roughly followed what is today MD 234 between Chaptico and MD 5 near Leonardtown via Clements. The modern MD 237 was designated along what had been county-maintained Chancellors Run Road around 1987. By 2003, heavy traffic along MD 237 related to greater activity at NAS Patuxent River led to the highway being marked for expansion. Between 2008 and 2010, MD 237 was expanded from a two-lane undivided road to a four-lane divided highway from Pegg Road to MD 235. The speed limit on the road increased from 40 mph (64 km/h) to 45 mph (72 km/h) in 2015

== Junction list ==
The entire route is in St. Mary's County.

Location	mi	km	Destinations	Notes
Lexington Park	0.00	0.00	MD 246 (Great Mills Road) – Great Mills, NAS Patuxent River	Southern terminus
California	2.95	4.75	MD 235 (Three Notch Road) – Lexington Park, Charlotte Hall	Northern terminus
1.000 mi = 1.609 km; 1.000 km = 0.621 mi
