= Maryland Route 247 =

State highway in Maryland, United States

Maryland Route 247
- Loveville Road

Route information
- Maintained by MDSHA
- Length: 2.89 mi (4.65 km)
- Existed: 1942–present

Major junctions
- South end: MD 5 in Loveville
- MD 235 in Oakville
- North end: Oakville Road in Oakville

Location
- Country: United States
- State: Maryland
- Counties: St. Mary's

Highway system
- Maryland highway system; Interstate; US; State; Scenic Byways
← MD 246	→ MD 249

Maryland Route 247 (MD 247) is a state highway in Maryland. Known as Loveville Road, the highway runs 2.89 miles (4.65 km) from MD 5 in Loveville north to Oakville Road in Oakville. MD 247, which serves as a connector between MD 5 and MD 235 in northern St. Mary's County, was constructed in the early 1940s.

== Route description ==
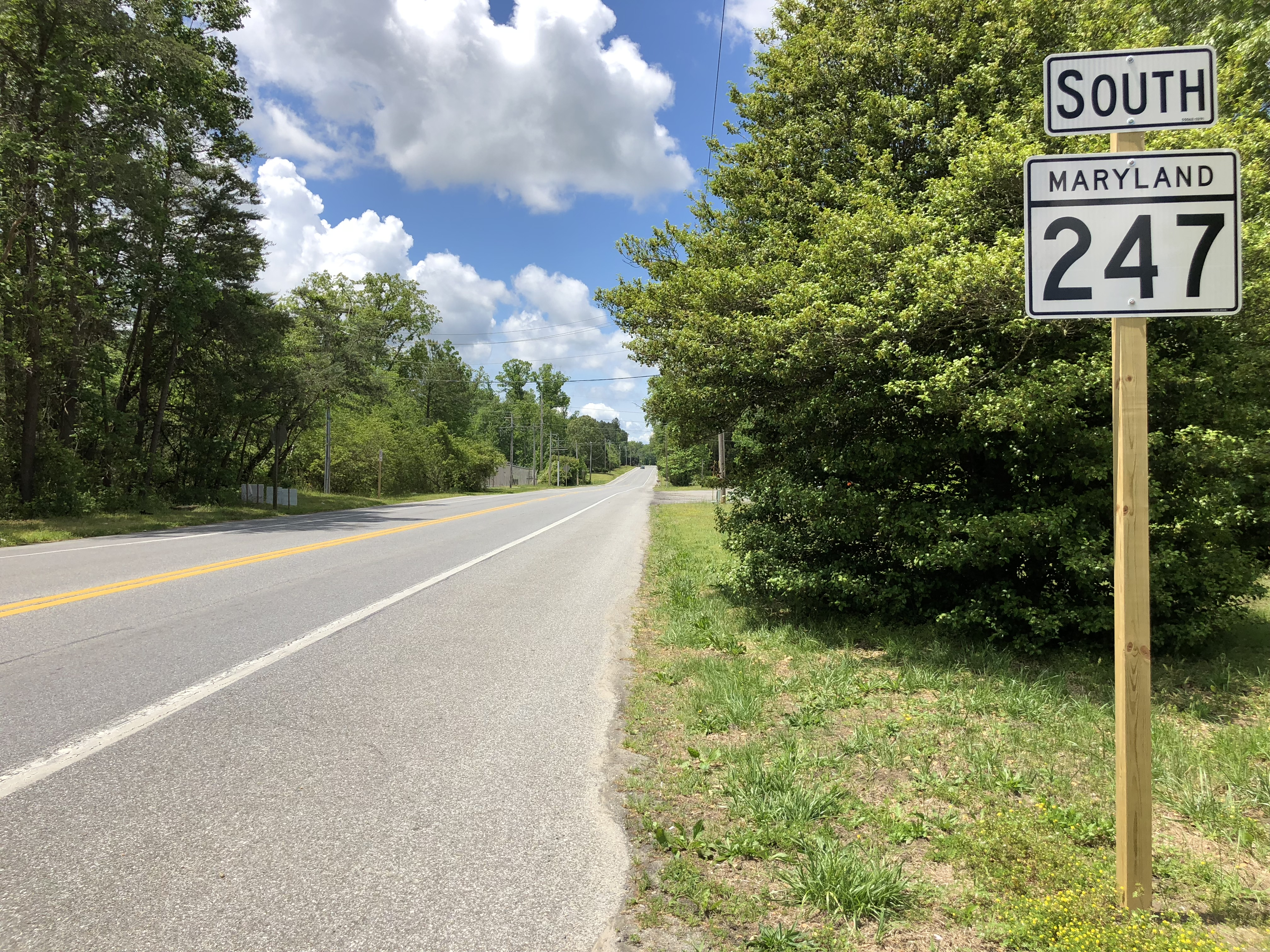
View south along MD 247 at MD 235 in Oakville

MD 247 begins at an intersection with MD 5 (Point Lookout Road) in Loveville. The state highway heads north as a two-lane undivided road through farmland. MD 247 intersects MD 235 (Three Notch Road) in Oakville before reaching its northern terminus at Oakville Road, the old alignment of MD 235.

== History ==
MD 247 was constructed as a gravel road between 1940 and 1942. Aside from repaving, the state highway has changed very little since.

== Junction list ==
The entire route is in St. Mary's County.

Location	mi	km	Destinations	Notes
Loveville	0.00	0.00	MD 5 (Point Lookout Road) – Leonardtown, Waldorf	Southern terminus
Oakville	2.84	4.57	MD 235 (Three Notch Road) – Lexington Park, Waldorf	
Oakville	2.89	4.65	Oakville Road	Northern terminus; old alignment of MD 235
1.000 mi = 1.609 km; 1.000 km = 0.621 mi
