= Maryland Route 235 =

Highway in Maryland

Maryland Route 235
- Three Notch Road
- Maryland Route 235 highlighted in red

Route information
- Maintained by MDSHA
- Length: 30.63 mi (49.29 km)
- Existed: 1927–present

Major junctions
- South end: MD 5 in Ridge
- MD 489 in Park Hall; MD 712 in Hermanville; MD 246 in Lexington Park; MD 237 in California; MD 4 in California; MD 245 in Hollywood; MD 472 in Oakville; MD 247 in Oakville; MD 6 in Oraville
- North end: MD 5 near Mechanicsville

Location
- Country: United States
- State: Maryland
- Counties: St. Mary's

Highway system
- Maryland highway system; Interstate; US; State; Scenic Byways
← MD 234	→ MD 236

Maryland Route 235 (MD 235) is a state highway in the U.S. state of Maryland. Known as Three Notch Road, the state highway runs 30.63 miles (49.29 km) between its southern intersection with MD 5 in Ridge and its northern intersection with MD 5 near Mechanicsville. While the southern part of the state highway is a two-lane undivided rural road, the northern part of MD 235 is a four- to six-lane divided highway connecting Naval Air Station Patuxent River (NAS Patuxent River) and the Washington, D.C., metro area in conjunction with MD 5. Three Notch Road has been the main highway between northern St. Mary's County and Point Lookout since the colonial era. The highway was reconstructed as the modern MD 235 between 1923 and 1938. The state highway was then completely rebuilt during World War II to serve the recently established NAS Patuxent River. Between 1960 and 1985, MD 235 was converted into a four-lane divided highway to the west and north of the military base. In the face of increasing activity at the base, the highway adjacent to NAS Patuxent River was expanded to six lanes in the early 2000s.

== Route description ==
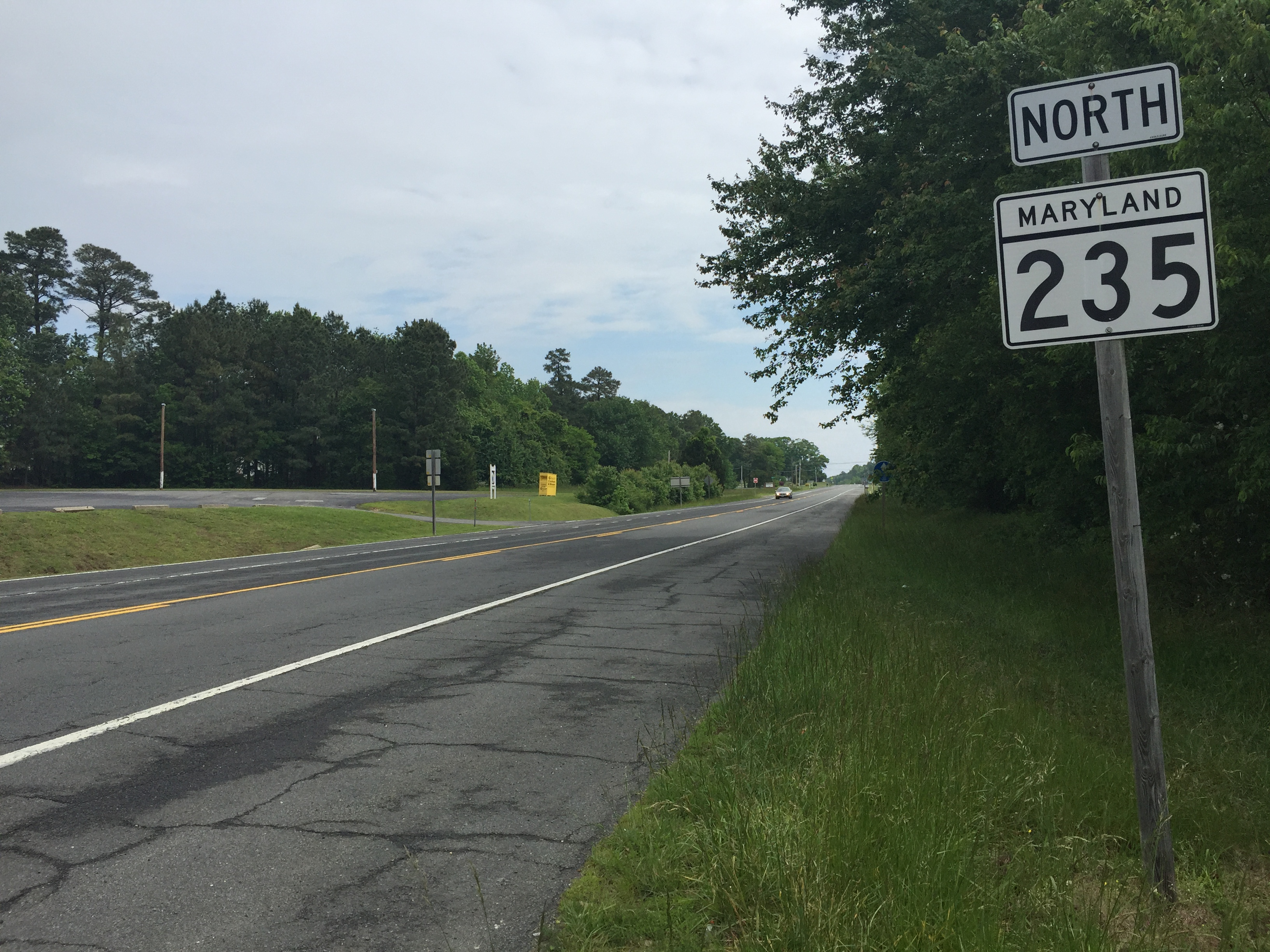
View north from the south end of MD 235 at MD 5 in Ridge

MD 235 begins at an intersection with MD 5 (Point Lookout Road) in Ridge. The state highway heads north as a two-lane undivided road that passes through the community of Dameron and to the west of The Elms Wildlife Management Area. MD 235 meets the eastern end of MD 489 (Park Hall Road), a connector between MD 235 and MD 5, east of Park Hall Estates. The state highway passes a section of old alignment, Poplar Ridge Road, on the east, then curves northwest and intersects MD 712 (Forest Park Road) and Hermanville Road in the hamlet of Hermanville at the southern edge of NAS Patuxent River. MD 235 expands to a four-lane road with a center left-turn lane and the highway runs along the western edge of the military base. The state highway intersects MD 246 (Great Mills Road), which serves the main gate of NAS Patuxent River, in the center of Lexington Park.

MD 235 continues northwest along the boundary of NAS Patuxent River as a six-lane divided highway. Beyond Pegg Road, which heads east to another entrance to the military base, the highway leaves the vicinity of the naval air station. MD 235 continues into California, where the highway meets the northern end of MD 237 (Chancellors Run Road). A short distance to the north, MD 235 intersects MD 4, which heads west as St. Andrew's Church Road and east as Patuxent Beach Road toward the Governor Thomas Johnson Bridge over the Patuxent River to Calvert County. Beyond MD 4, the highway reduces to a four-lane divided highway and passes to the east of St. Mary's County Regional Airport. The first of several sections of old alignment, Mervell Dean Road, splits to the north; the northern portion of the old highway is MD 944. MD 235 continues past Clarkes Landing Road, which is unsigned MD 944C, before it receives the northern end of MD 944 a little south of the main road's intersection with MD 245 (Hollywood Road/Sotterley Road) in Hollywood.

MD 235 receives Old Three Notch Road as it leaves Hollywood, then it parallels another of its former courses, Clover Hill Road, as the highway passes through Hillville. Beyond the intersection with MD 472 (North Sandgates Road), MD 235 passes through Oakville, where another old alignment, Oakville Road, splits to the north before the main road intersects MD 247 (Loveville Road). Mt. Zion Church Road, yet another old alignment, splits to the north in the hamlet of Laurel Grove before MD 235 intersects the eastern terminus of MD 6 (New Market–Turner Road) and Morganza–Turner Road in Oraville. The final old alignment of MD 235, Harpers Corner Road, splits to the west shortly before the state highway reaches its northern terminus at MD 5 near Mechanicsville. MD 5 heads southwest as two-lane Point Lookout Road toward Leonardtown. Northbound MD 5 continues straight on the divided highway as Three Notch Road toward Charlotte Hall and Waldorf.

MD 235 is part of the main National Highway System from MD 246 in Lexington Park to its northern junction with MD 5 in Mechanicsville. The highway is also a National Highway System principal arterial between MD 712 and MD 246 in Lexington Park.

== History ==
MD 235 follows the path of what was the first major long-distance highway in St. Mary's County, the Patuxent Main Road. The road, established by 1692, connected Point Lookout and northern St. Mary's County along the drainage divide between the Potomac River and Chesapeake Bay. The Patuxent Main Road later became known as the Three Notch Road based on a 1704 law that stated "three notches of equal distance marked on the trees indicated a road leading to a ferry." The whereabouts of the ferry to which this road led are unknown. After 200 years of little improvement, reconstruction of the Three Notch Road by the Maryland State Roads Commission began in 1923 when the highway was rebuilt as a 15-foot (4.6 m) wide gravel road from MD 5 near Mechanicsville south to MD 472 in Oakville. The gravel road was extended south from Oakville 1 mile (1.6 km) to Friendship School Road in 1924.

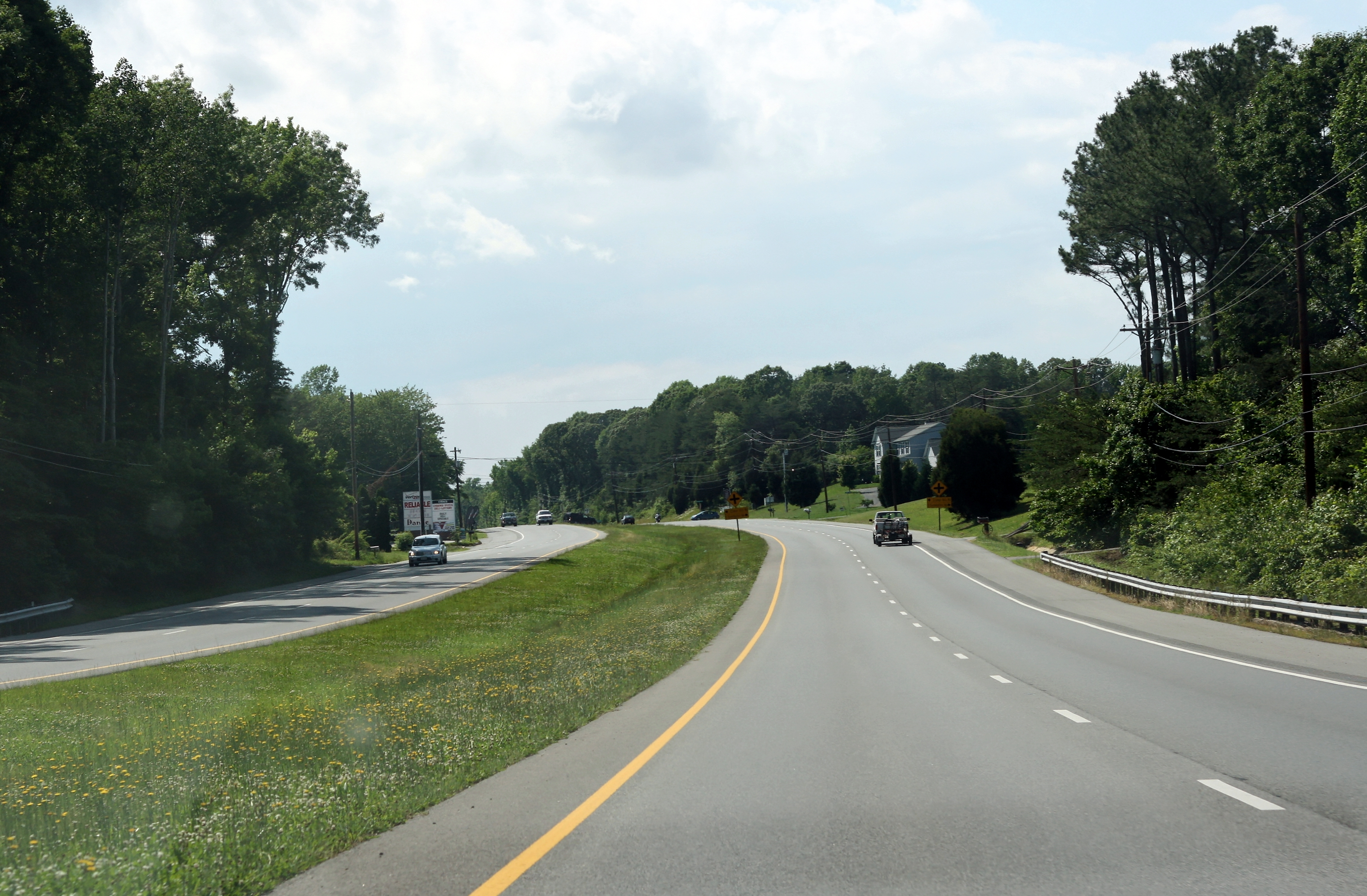
MD 235 northbound approaching intersection with Clover Hill Road and South Sandgates Road

Construction on Three Notch Road resumed in 1926 when two sections were placed under construction. A 1-mile (1.6 km) segment of gravel highway was constructed south from MD 246 in Jarboesville (now Lexington Park) toward Hermanville in 1926 and 1927. The northern segment of MD 235 was extended to Hillville in 1928 and to Hollywood in 1929. The southern gravel section of the highway was extended 1 mile (1.6 km) south to Hermanville in 1930. Also in 1930, construction on the 6.5-mile (10.5 km) gap between Hollywood and Jarboesville began and a new segment of MD 235 was started from Ridge north 3 miles (4.8 km) to Dameron. The Ridge–Dameron segment was completed in 1932 and the gravel highway from Hollywood to Jarboesville was finished in 1933. The gravel section constructed from Ridge reached Bay Forest Road by 1935 and Hermanville in 1938, completing MD 235.

Immediately after the beginning of U.S. involvement in World War II, the U.S. Navy made plans to construct a naval air station on the Cedar Point peninsula near Jarboesville. MD 235 was marked for an upgrade from MD 5 to Jarboesville both to connect the new military installation with Washington and to allow the road to handle the heavy military traffic that would travel the highway during the military base's construction and operations. The highway was under construction by the end of 1942. The highway's gravel surface was widened as a first layer and surface treated in autumn 1943 to help heavy traffic during the winter. In spring 1944 the first layer was scarified and the top 4 inches (10 cm) were mixed with asphalt to form a base. This base was covered with a 2-inch (5.1 cm) wearing surface of bituminous concrete. MD 235 was also reconstructed in this manner from Jarboesville to Hermanville in 1944 and 1945; included in that project was the construction of MD 712 to provide a modern highway to the naval air station's South Gate. During the reconstruction of MD 235, the highway was relocated in many places between Mechanicsville and Hollywood to remove substandard curves and avoid grade crossings with the southern extension of the Washington, Brandywine and Point Lookout Railroad that the U.S. Navy constructed contemporaneously to provide a rail link to the military base. Many of the bypassed stretches of highway—which included Harpers Corner Road in Oraville, Mount Zion Church Road in Laurel Grove, Oakville Road in Oakville, Clover Hill Road in Hillville, Old Three Notch Road in Hollywood, and the southernmost portion of Mervell Dean Road—were designated as sections of MD 722.

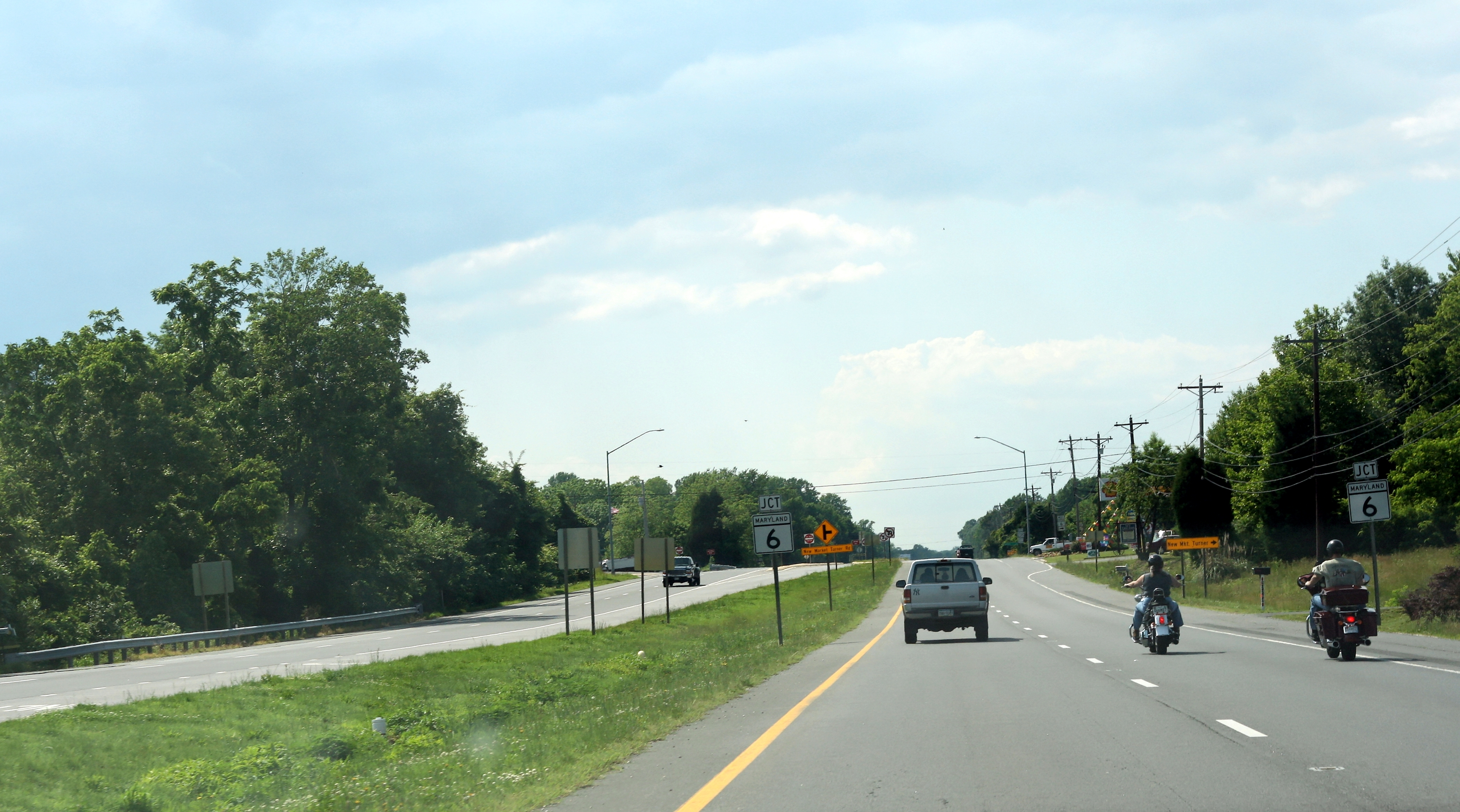
MD 235 northbound approaching MD 6 in Oraville

The next major project along MD 235 was the reconstruction of the 1930s gravel highway between Ridge and Hermanville. Construction began in 1957 from Hermanville and was completed south to Park Hall in 1959, with the remainder of the highway completed around 1960. MD 235 was relocated between Park Hall and Hermanville, leaving behind Poplar Ridge Road as an old alignment. Also in 1960, the state highway was expanded to a divided highway from Hermanville to Lexington Park. MD 235 was widened to a divided highway from Hollywood to Hillville in 1968, from Mechanicsville to Oakville in 1969, and from MD 246 in Lexington Park to Town Creek Drive in California in 1973. Two sections of divided highway were completed in 1982: from Town Creek Drive to just north of the newly constructed MD 4 intersection in California; and from Oakville to Hillville. The final segment of MD 235 between Hermanville and Mechanicsville to be expanded to a divided highway was completed from California to Hollywood in 1985. The portion of the state highway from just north of St. Mary's County Regional Airport to just south of MD 245 in Hollywood was relocated to the west along the right-of-way of the Washington, Brandywine and Point Lookout Railroad, which had earlier been abandoned. The bypassed highway was renamed as a northward extension of Mervell Dean Road and designated MD 944.

MD 235 was widened in Lexington Park and California between 2000 and 2004 due to increased activity at the military base and its supporting industries. The state highway was widened to six lanes from north of Pegg Road to Town Creek Drive in 2000 and from Town Creek Drive to just north of MD 4 in 2001. Expansion to six lanes occurred from FDR Boulevard to north of Pegg Road in 2003. The final section of widening occurred in 2004 when the six-lane section was extended south from FDR Boulevard to MD 246. MD 235 between MD 712 and MD 246 was transformed from a four-lane divided highway to a five-lane road with center turn lane in 2004 as well.

== Junction list ==
The entire route is in St. Mary's County.

Location	mi	km	Destinations	Notes
Ridge	0.00	0.00	MD 5 (Point Lookout Road) – Point Lookout, St. Mary's City	Southern terminus
Park Hall Estates	7.64	12.30	MD 489 west (Park Hall Road) – St. Mary's City	Eastern terminus of MD 489
Hermanville	9.85	15.85	MD 712 north (Forest Park Road) / Hermanville Road south – NAS Patuxent River	Southern terminus of MD 712
Lexington Park	11.93	19.20	MD 246 (Great Mills Road/Cedar Point Road) – Great Mills, NAS Patuxent River	
California	14.91	24.00	MD 237 south (Chancellors Run Road) – Lexington Park	Northern terminus of MD 237
California	16.60	26.72	MD 4 (Patuxent Beach Road/St. Andrew's Church Road) – Leonardtown, Solomons, Annapolis	
Hollywood	18.66	30.03	Clarkes Landing Road east	Unsigned MD 944C
Hollywood	20.48	32.96	MD 944 south (Mervell Dean Road)	Northern terminus of MD 944
Hollywood	20.71	33.33	MD 245 (Hollywood Road/Sotterley Road) – Leonardtown	
Oakville	25.85	41.60	MD 472 north (North Sandgates Road) – Sandgates	Southern terminus of MD 472
Oakville	26.60	42.81	MD 247 south (Loveville Road) – Loveville	Northern terminus of MD 247
Oraville	29.25	47.07	MD 6 west (New Market–Turner Road) – Huntersville	Eastern terminus of MD 6
Mechanicsville	30.63	49.29	MD 5 (Point Lookout Road/Three Notch Road) – Leonardtown, Waldorf	Northern terminus
1.000 mi = 1.609 km; 1.000 km = 0.621 mi
