= Maryland Route 489 =

State highway in Maryland, United States

Maryland Route 489
- Park Hall Road
- Maryland Route 489 highlighted in red

Route information
- Maintained by MDSHA
- Length: 1.27 mi (2.04 km)
- Existed: 1956–present

Major junctions
- West end: MD 5 in Park Hall Estates
- East end: MD 235 near Park Hall Estates

Location
- Country: United States
- State: Maryland
- Counties: St. Mary's

Highway system
- Maryland highway system; Interstate; US; State; Scenic Byways
← MD 488	→ MD 490

Maryland Route 489 (MD 489) is a state highway in the U.S. state of Maryland. Known as Park Hall Road, the state highway runs 1.27 miles (2.04 km) from MD 5 east to MD 235 within Park Hall Estates in southern St. Mary's County. MD 489, which serves as a connector between MD 5 and MD 235 south of Lexington Park, was assigned to Park Hall Road in 1956.

== Route description ==
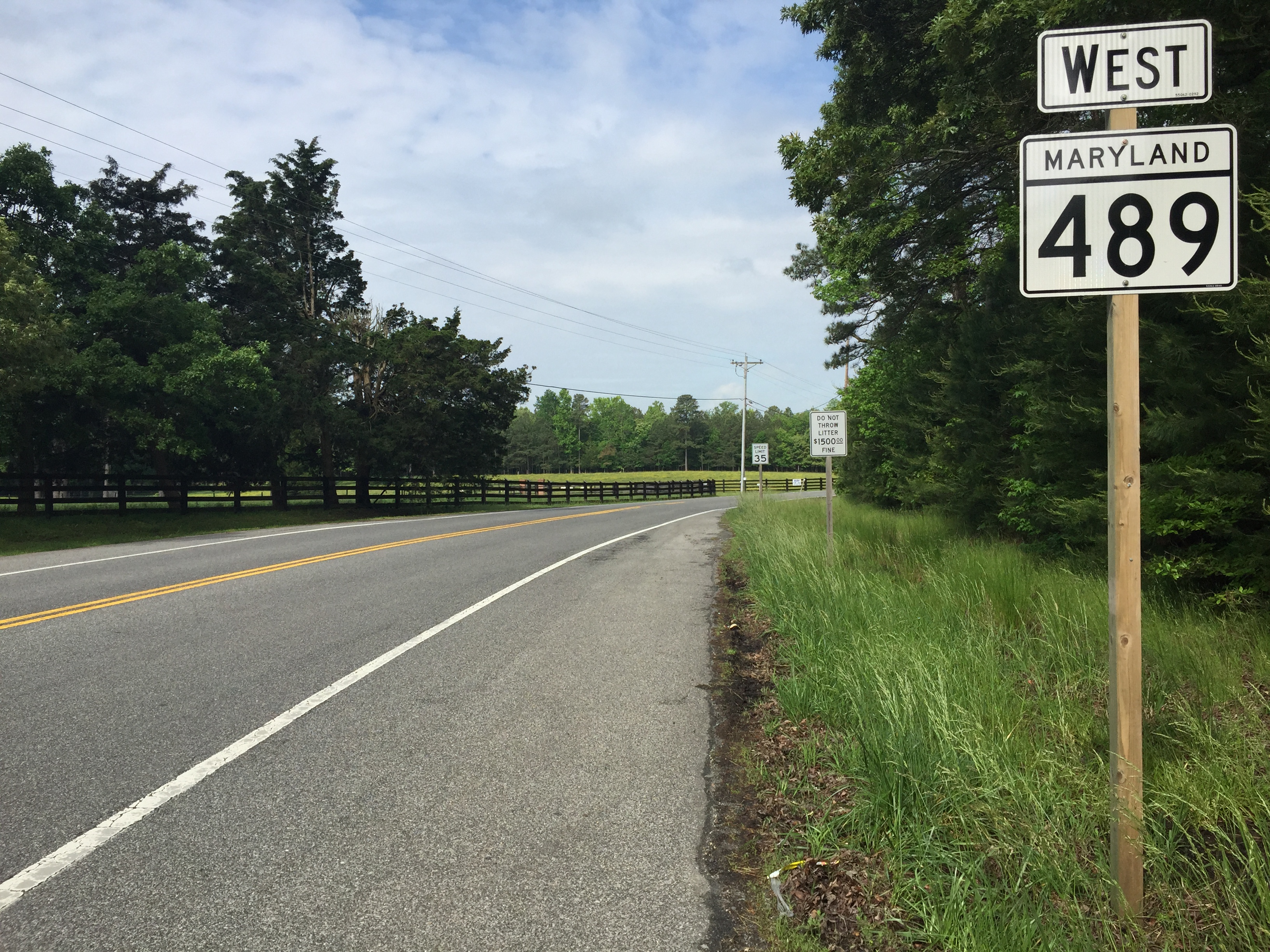
View west from the east end of MD 489 at MD 235 near Park Hall Estates

MD 489 begins at an intersection with MD 5 (Point Lookout Road) in the unincorporated community of Park Hall Estates between St. Mary's City and Great Mills. The state highway heads east as a two-lane undivided road through a mix of farmland and forest. MD 489 reaches its eastern terminus at MD 235 (Three Notch Road) between Ridge and Lexington Park.

== History ==
MD 489 was assigned to Park Hall Road in 1956. Aside from repaving, the state highway has changed very little since then.

== Junction list ==
The entire route is in Park Hall Estates, St. Mary's County.

mi	km	Destinations	Notes
0.00	0.00	MD 5 (Point Lookout Road) – St. Mary's City, Leonardtown	Western terminus
1.27	2.04	MD 235 (Three Notch Road) – Lexington Park, Ridge	Eastern terminus
1.000 mi = 1.609 km; 1.000 km = 0.621 mi
