= St. Mary's County Public Schools =

School district in Maryland, United States

Address
- 23160 Moakley Street, Leonardtown, MD, 20650 St. Mary's County, Maryland; United States

District information
- Grades: Prekindergarten-12
- Established: 1928
- Superintendent: J. Scott Smith
- NCES District ID: 2400600

Students and staff
- Students: 17000
- Staff: 2283
- Athletic conference: Southern Maryland Athletic Conference

St. Mary's County Public Schools (SMCPS) is a school district that serves St. Mary's County, Maryland, United States, at the confluence of the Potomac River, Patuxent River, and the Chesapeake Bay. The area is a mixture of rural and suburban communities. Many of the families are employed by NAS Patuxent River, government contractors, St. Mary's College of Maryland, county government, and others involved in the traditional agriculture and water-related businesses. It has an approximate enrollment of almost 17,000 students. SMCPS operates 18 elementary schools, 5 middle schools, 4 high schools, an Alternative Learning Center, and a Vocational Training Center, serving students in Grades Pre-K through 12th grade. The school system is overseen by the Maryland State Department of Education.

The current interim superintendent of schools is James Scott Smith, who assumed duties in August 2014, after the departure of the previous superintendent, Dr. Michael J. Martirano, who accepted an offer to serve as the state superintendent of schools for the State of West Virginia.

== History ==
Public education in St. Mary's County can be traced to the General Act of 1723, which encouraged the development of public schools in the Maryland colony. Later, the Charlotte Hall Military Academy was established in 1774.

Public education in Southern Maryland continued with one-room schoolhouses being constructed across the region in the 1860s. They were often segregated by race, with the all-black Drayden schoolhouse being established in the 1890s. The St. Mary's County Public School system was established in 1928.

Following the U.S. Supreme Court's 1954 decision in Brown v. Board of Education, the NAACP sued the system to present a plan on desegregation, with the county being resistant to change. The process of school integration began in the 1957-58 school year, with the first African American students attending Great Mills High School that year. Full integration was implemented in 1967.

In 1966, an elected school board took charge of the district, taking over from an appointed board.

== High schools ==
- Chopticon (Morganza)
- Leonardtown (Leonardtown)
- Great Mills (Great Mills)
- Fairlead Academy (Leonardtown)

== Middle schools ==
- Esperanza (California)
- Leonardtown (Leonardtown)
- Margaret Brent (Helen)
- Spring Ridge (Lexington Park)
- Chesapeake Public Charter School (Great Mills)

== Elementary schools ==
- Benjamin Banneker (Loveville)
- Captain Walter Francis Duke (Leonardtown)
- Dynard (Chaptico)
- Evergreen (California)
- George Washington Carver (Lexington Park)
- Green Holly (Lexington Park)
- Greenview Knolls (Great Mills)
- Hollywood (Hollywood)
- Leonardtown (Leonardtown)
- Lettie Marshall Dent (Mechanicsville)
- Lexington Park (Lexington Park)
- Mechanicsville (Mechanicsville)
- Oakville (Mechanicsville)
- Park Hall (Park Hall)
- Piney Point (Tall Timbers)
- Ridge (Ridge)
- Town Creek (Lexington Park)
- White Marsh (Mechanicsville)

== Other ==
- Alternative Learning Center (Leonardtown)
- Chesapeake Public Charter School (Great Mills)
- Dr. James A. Forrest Career and Technology Center (Leonardtown)
- Virtual Academy (Great Mills)

== See also ==
- College of Southern Maryland, public community college with campuses across Southern Maryland, including St. Mary's County
- St. Mary's College of Maryland, public college in St. Mary's City, Maryland
- St. Mary's Ryken High School, private school in St. Mary's County
- University System of Maryland, operates a regional higher education center in California, Maryland
- List of school districts in Maryland
