= Maryland Route 245 =

State highway in Maryland, United States

Maryland Route 245
- Maryland Route 245 highlighted in red

Route information
- Maintained by MDSHA
- Length: 7.55 mi (12.15 km)
- Existed: 1927–present

Major junctions
- South end: MD 5 in Leonardtown
- MD 235 in Hollywood
- North end: Steer Horn Neck Road near Hollywood

Location
- Country: United States
- State: Maryland
- Counties: St. Mary's

Highway system
- Maryland highway system; Interstate; US; State; Scenic Byways
← MD 244	→ MD 246

Maryland Route 245 (MD 245) is a state highway in the U.S. state of Maryland. Known for most of its length as Hollywood Road, the state highway runs 7.55 miles (12.15 km) from MD 5 and Washington Street in Leonardtown north to Steer Horn Neck Road near Hollywood. MD 245 connects Leonardtown with MD 235 in Hollywood in central St. Mary's County. The state highway was constructed in the mid-1920s and rebuilt around 1950.

== Route description ==
MD 245 begins at an intersection with MD 5 (Point Lookout Road) and Washington Street in the town of Leonardtown. Washington Street heads south from the intersection opposite MD 245 to serve downtown Leonardtown. MD 245 heads north as Hollywood Road, a three-lane road with a center left-turn lane. The state highway immediately passes between the Leonardtown campus of the College of Southern Maryland to the east and the St. Mary's Nursing Center to the west. MD 245 continues north past the MedStar St. Mary's Hospital to the west and several county facilities, including the St. Mary's County Governmental Center, to the east. The state highway passes Leonard Hall Naval Academy and the T Barracks of the Maryland State Police before the road narrows to two lanes and leaves the town limits of Leonardtown.

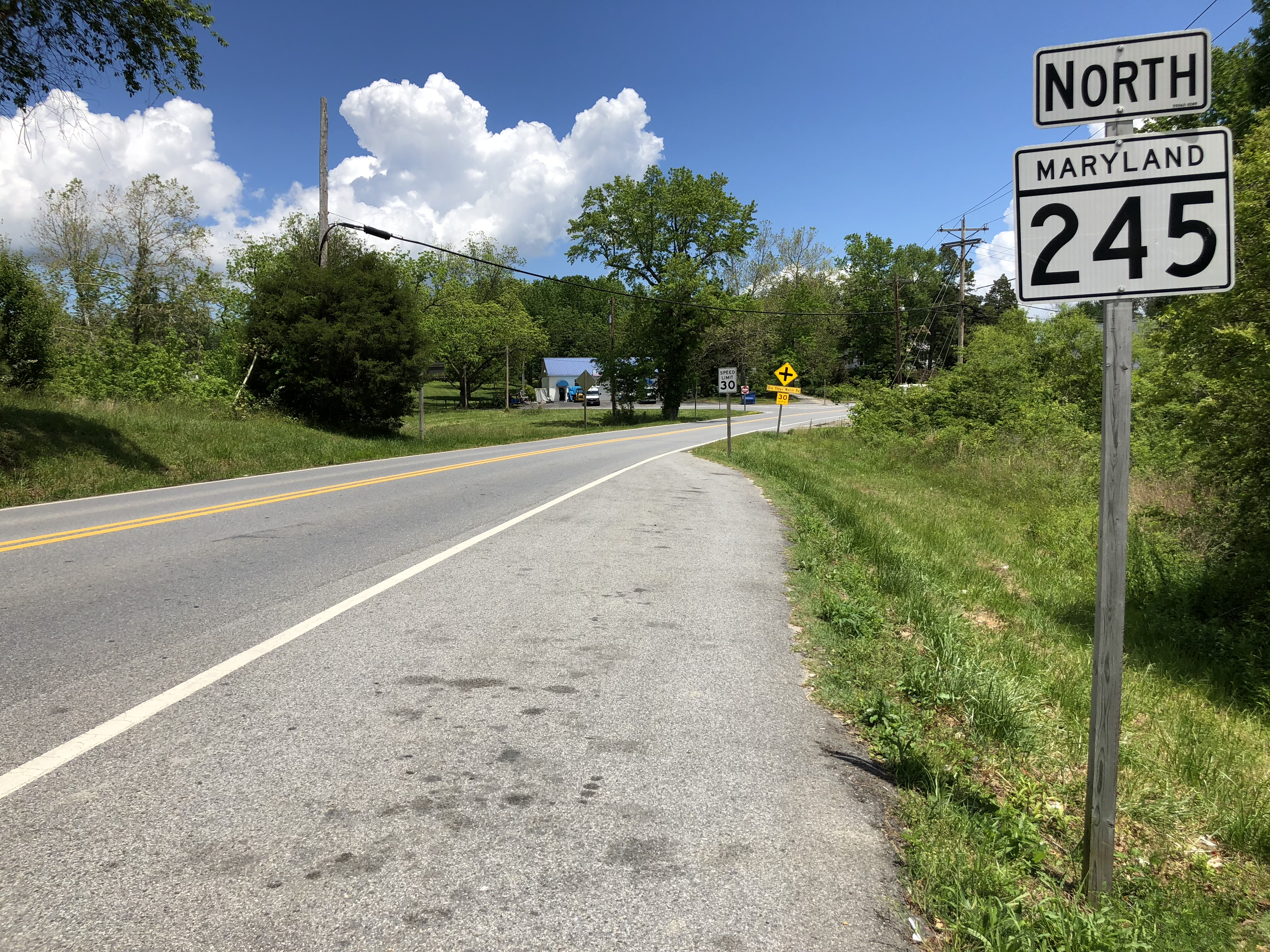
View north along MD 245 at MD 235 in Hollywood

At McIntosh Road, MD 245 curves northeast through a mix of farmland and forest. The state highway crosses Brooks Run before Old Hollywood Road, a loop of old alignment, splits to the east next to Hollywood Park. MD 245 enters the community of Hollywood, where the state highway intersects MD 235 (Three Notch Road) and Old Three Notch Road, the old alignment of MD 235. MD 245 continues northeast as Sotterley Road. The state highway crosses a branch of Cuckold Creek before reaching its northern terminus at Steer Horn Neck Road, which heads east toward Greenwell State Park. Sotterley Road continues north as a county highway toward Sotterley Plantation on the shore of the Patuxent River.

== History ==
MD 245 was constructed as a gravel road from MD 5 in Leonardtown north to McIntosh Road around 1923. The state highway was extended northeast to Hollywood in 1924 and 1925 and to its present northern terminus near Sotterley in 1925 and 1926. MD 245 was reconstructed and widened as a bituminous stabilized gravel road from Leonardtown to St. Johns Road in 1948. The state highway was rebuilt with a bituminous concrete surface from St. Johns Road to MD 235 in Hollywood in 1950 and 1951; this project included the relocation of the state highway around what is now Old Hollywood Road.

== Junction list ==
The entire route is in St. Mary's County.

Location	mi	km	Destinations	Notes
Leonardtown	0.00	0.00	MD 5 (Point Lookout Road) – Lexington Park, Waldorf	Southern terminus
Hollywood	5.27	8.48	MD 235 (Three Notch Road) – Lexington Park, Waldorf	
Hollywood	7.55	12.15	Sotterley Road north / Steer Horn Neck Road east	Northern terminus
1.000 mi = 1.609 km; 1.000 km = 0.621 mi
