= St. Andrew's Church (Leonardtown, Maryland) =

Historic church in Maryland, United States

- U.S. National Register of Historic Places
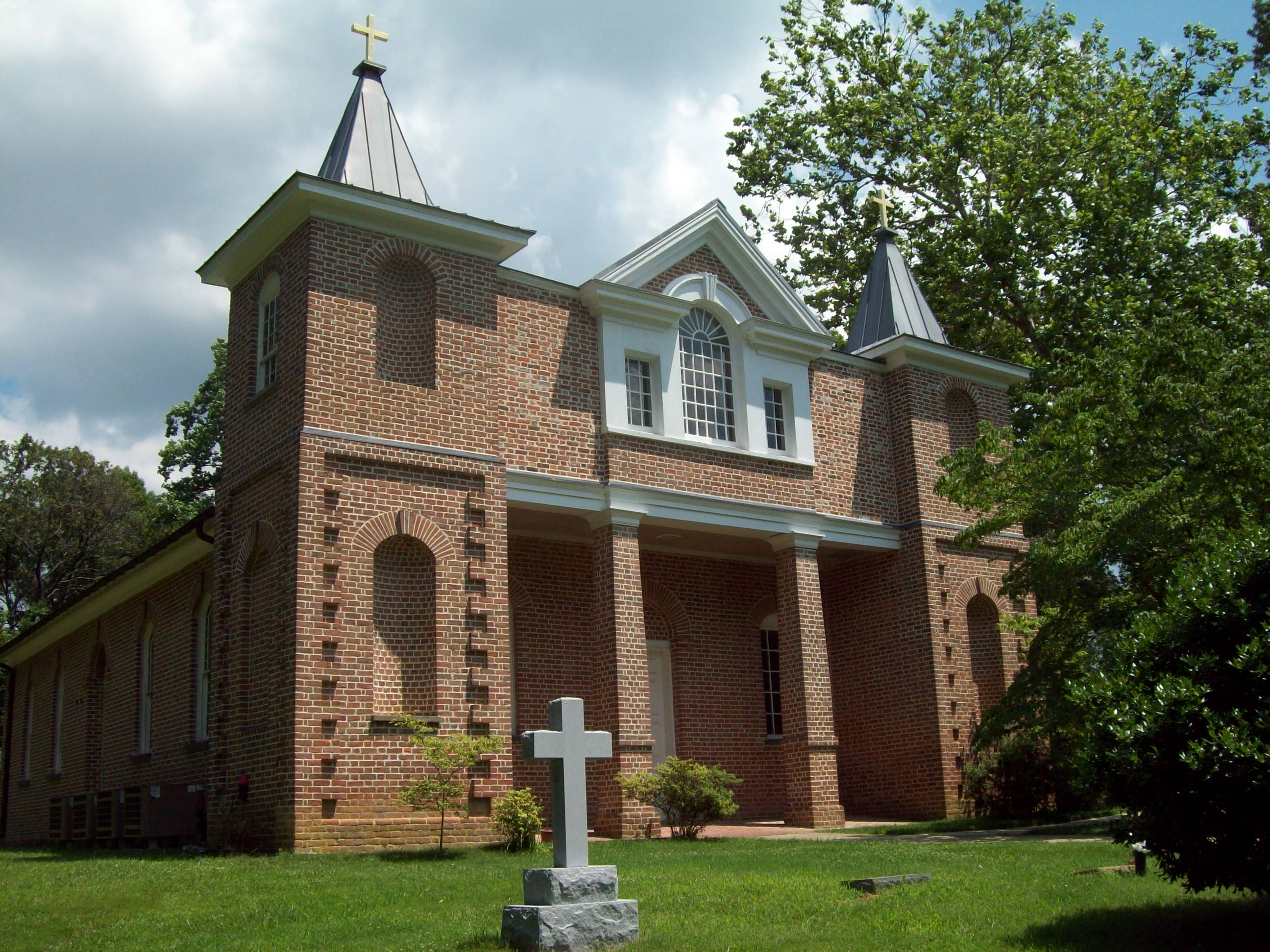
- St. Andrew's Church, July 2009

- Location within Maryland Location within the United States
- Location: 44078 St. Andrew's Church Road; California, Maryland
- Nearest city: Leonardtown, Maryland
- Coordinates: 38°17′16″N 76°33′6″W
- Built: 1766
- Architect: Boulton, Richard
- Architectural style: Georgian
- NRHP reference No.: 73002171
- Added to NRHP: March 14, 1973

St. Andrew's Church is a historic church located at 44078 St. Andrew's Church Road, California near Leonardtown, St. Mary's County, Maryland. It was built in 1766 to serve as the parish church of St. Andrew's Parish, which had been established in 1744. It is a rectangular brick box church laid in Flemish bond with a gable roof and round-arched windows trimmed with brick segmental arches. At two corners stand two-story square brick towers with a diminutive spire. Richard Boulton designed the church in 1766; he was also responsible for the outstanding carving and ornamentation at Sotterley. George Plater (1735–1792), who briefly served as Maryland's governor before his death, was an active parish member, serving twenty-eight years as a vestryman.

It was listed on the National Register of Historic Places in 1973.

== See also ==
- List of post 1692 Anglican parishes in the Province of Maryland
