= Maryland Route 712 =

State highway in Maryland, United States

Maryland Route 712
- Forest Park Road

Route information
- Maintained by MDSHA
- Length: 1.11 mi (1.79 km)
- Existed: 1945–present

Major junctions
- South end: MD 235 in Lexington Park
- North end: Entrance to NAS Patuxent River in Lexington Park

Location
- Country: United States
- State: Maryland
- Counties: St. Mary's

Highway system
- Maryland highway system; Interstate; US; State; Scenic Byways
| ← MD 711 | → MD 713 |

Maryland Route 712 (MD 712) is a state highway in the U.S. state of Maryland. Known as Forest Park Road, the state highway runs 1.11 miles (1.79 km) from MD 235 north to an entrance to Naval Air Station Patuxent River (NAS Patuxent River) within Lexington Park in eastern St. Mary's County. MD 712 was constructed in the mid-1940s as a military access project.

== Route description ==
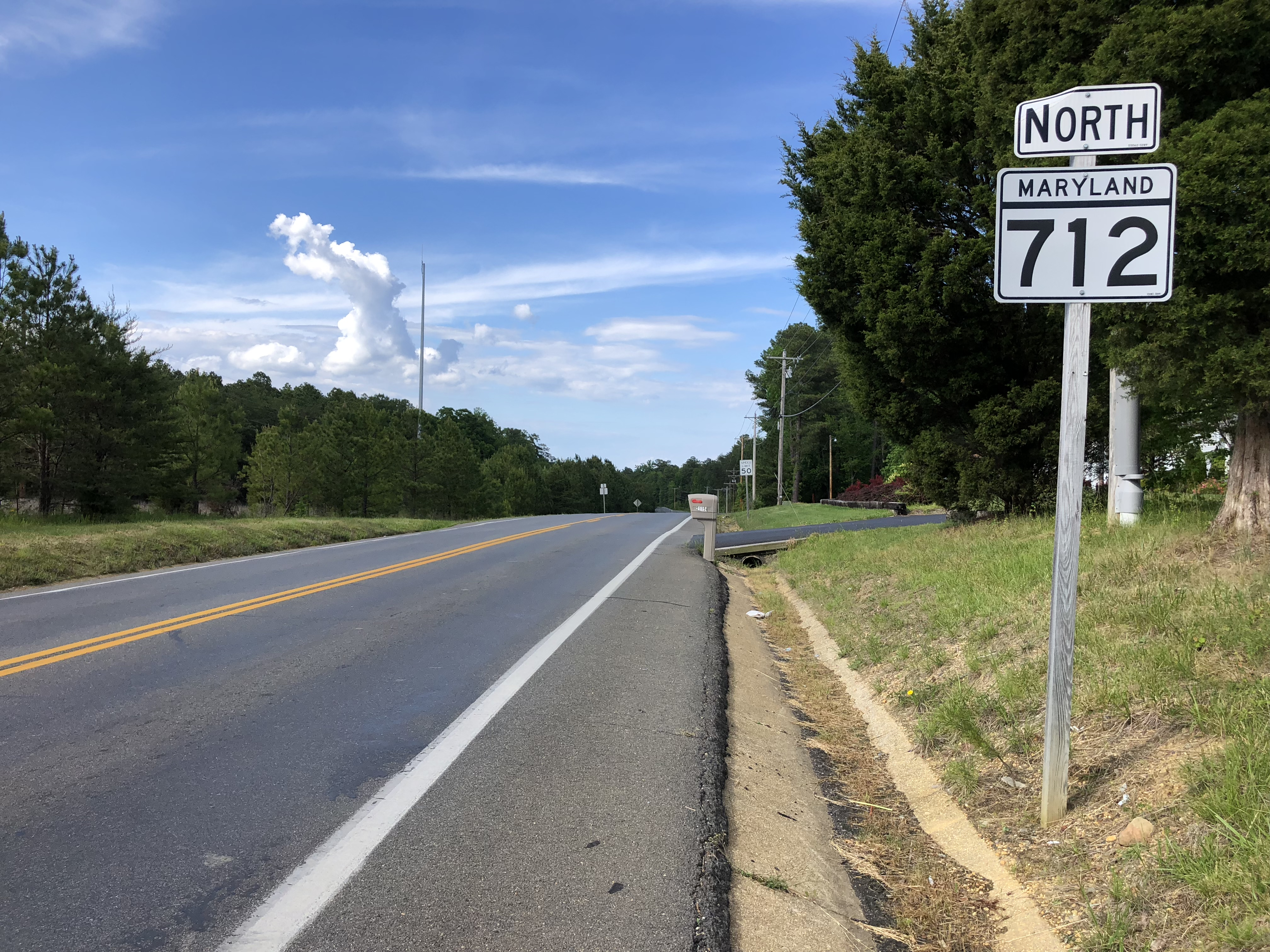
View north from the south end of MD 712 at MD 235 in Lexington Park

MD 712 begins at an intersection with MD 235 (Three Notch Road) on the southern edge of Lexington Park. The roadway continues on the opposite side of MD 235 as county-maintained Hermanville Road. MD 712 heads north as a two-lane undivided road through a forested area between residential subdivisions to the east and NAS Patuxent River to the west. The state highway parallels the military base's perimeter road for much of its length. Immediately after passing Pine Hill Run Road, the state highway reaches its northern terminus at an entrance to NAS Patuxent River.

== History ==
MD 712 was constructed as a military access project during World War II. The state highway was built as part of a 3-mile (4.8 km) project to improve MD 235 between Jarboesville (now Lexington Park) and the community of Hermanville and provide access to the South Gate of NAS Patuxent River. MD 712 was constructed in 1944 and 1945.

== Junction list ==
The entire route is in Lexington Park, St. Mary's County.

| mi | km | Destinations | Notes |
|---|---|---|---|
| 0.00 | 0.00 | MD 235 (Three Notch Road) / Hermanville Road west – Point Lookout, Waldorf | Southern terminus |
| 1.11 | 1.79 | Entrance to Naval Air Station Patuxent River | Northern terminus |
1.000 mi = 1.609 km; 1.000 km = 0.621 mi
