= Tudor Hall (Leonardtown, Maryland) =

Historic house in Maryland, United States

- U.S. National Register of Historic Places
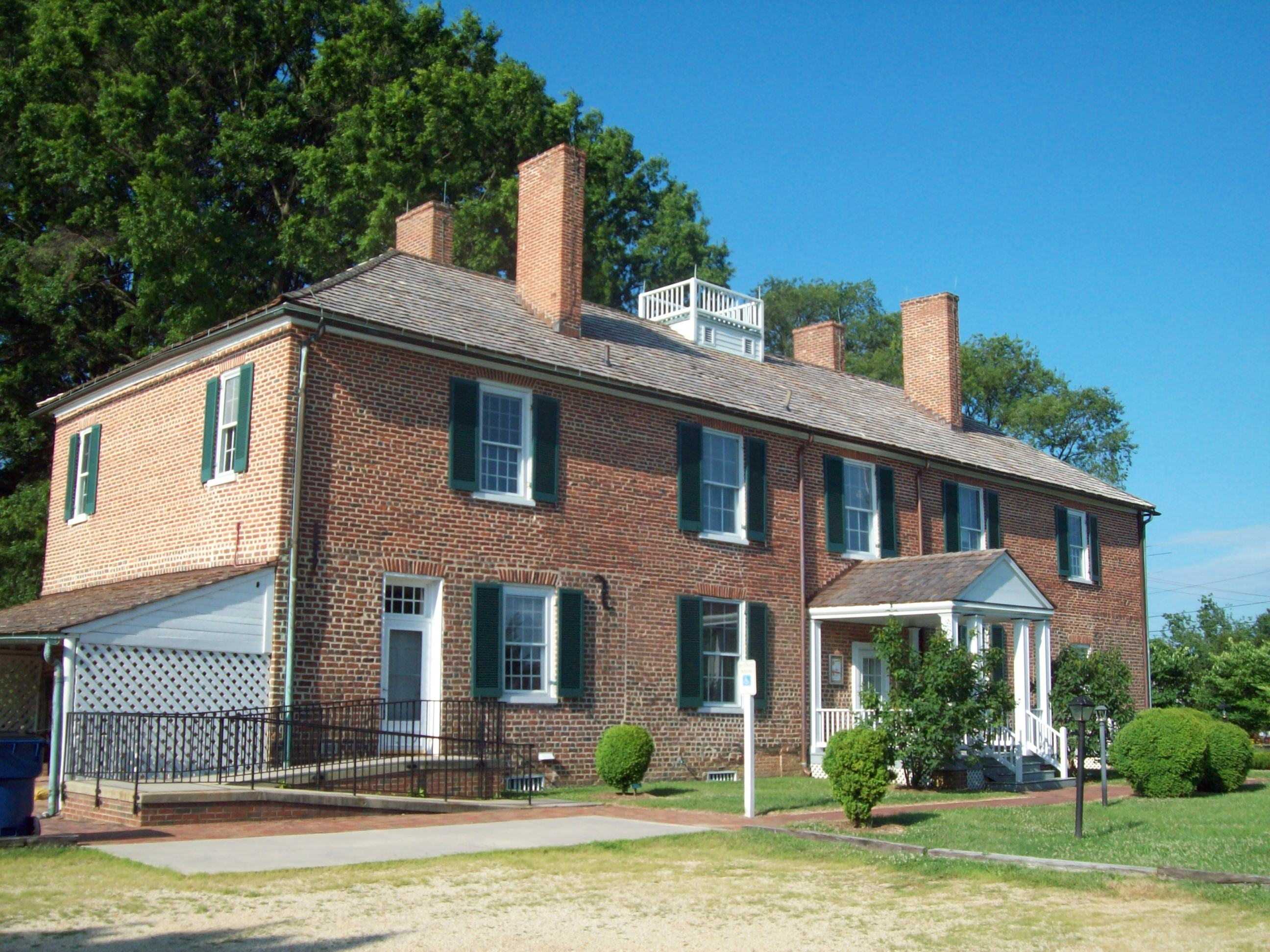
- Tudor Hall, July 2009

- Location within Maryland Location within the United States
- Interactive map showing the location of Tudor Hall
- Location: Tudor Hall Rd., Leonardtown, Maryland
- Built: 1798
- Architect: Barnes, Abraham
- NRHP reference No.: 73002172
- Added to NRHP: April 26, 1973

Tudor Hall is a historic home located at Leonardtown, St. Mary's County, Maryland. It is a large, rectangular, 2 1/2-story, Georgian brick building built about 1798. It is one of the oldest buildings in Leonardtown, which was created by the Maryland Legislature in 1720. It is home to the St. Mary's County Historical Society.

It was listed on the National Register of Historic Places in 1973.
