= St. Richard's Manor =

- U.S. National Register of Historic Places
- Location within Maryland Location within the United States
- Location: Millstone Landing Rd., Lexington Park, Maryland
- Coordinates: 38°17′45″N 76°28′12″W
- Architect: Unknown
- Architectural style: No Style Listed
- NRHP reference No.: 85000655
- Added to NRHP: March 28, 1985

St. Richard's Manor is a historic home located at Lexington Park, St. Mary's County, Maryland. It is a 1 1/2-story Flemish bond brick dwelling, with a steeply pitched gable roof, constructed before 1750 on the Patuxent River. Also on the property are two tobacco barns built about 1935, and a small pyramid-roofed concrete block pumphouse.

On December 16, 1652, "St. Richard's Manor" was re-patented to Luke Gardiner, heir of Richard Gardiner, because the original patent had been lost as a result of the internal strife with Ingle in 1645. Shortly afterwards /_that is in the 1650s _/ Richard Edelen was contracted by Luke to build a second house on the Manor on fifty-five acres of the original land patent. This house is no longer existent; despite some local conjecture, evidence points to construction relatively shortly before 1750. Richard Edelen built a second house called "Riverview" (circa 1659) for Luke Gardiner near St. Clements Island.

St. Richard's Manor was listed on the National Register of Historic Places in 1985.
