= Mattapany-Sewall Archeological Site =

Coordinates: 38°17′8.5″N 76°25′41.1″W

- U.S. National Register of Historic Places
- Location within Maryland Location within the United States
- Nearest city: Lexington Park, Maryland
- Built: 1663
- NRHP reference No.: 85000164
- Added to NRHP: February 1, 1985

Mattapany-Sewall Archeological Site is an archaeological site in St. Mary's County, Maryland. It is located at the Patuxent River Naval Air Station on a level terrace approximately 45' above sea level, less than 1000' south of the Patuxent River in an unused wooded/grassy tract. Documentary evidence identifies the site as Mattapany-Sewall, a manor established in 1663 and occupied from 1666 to 1684 by Charles Calvert, 3rd Baron Baltimore. It served as a governmental meeting place and colonial arsenal, and was the scene of the 1689 battle, known as the Protestant Revolution of 1689, in which Maryland's Proprietary government was overthrown.

It was placed on the National Register of Historic Places in 1985.
