= Oraville, Maryland =

Unincorporated community in Maryland, United States

- Unincorporated community
- Location within Maryland
- Coordinates: 38°25′04″N 76°41′39″W
- Country: United States
- State: Maryland
- County: St. Mary's
- Elevation: 157 ft (48 m)
- Time zone: UTC-5 (Eastern (EST))
  - Summer (DST): UTC-4 (EDT)
- Postal code: 20659
- Area codes: 301 & 240
- GNIS feature ID: 594856

Oraville is an unincorporated community in St. Mary's County, Maryland, United States. Oraville is located at the intersection of Maryland routes 6 and 235, 6.3 miles (10.1 km) southeast of Charlotte Hall.

The name Oraville is believed to be named after a girl named Ora Hopkins. Her stepfather, Nicholas S Hopkins, ran a millinery store in the early 1900s which was also a post office on the corner of Morganza Turner Rd and Route 235. The house still stands but is in ruins.
