= St. Mary's County Regional Airport =

Coordinates: 38°18′55″N 076°33′00″W

St. Mary's County Regional Airport Capt. Walter Francis Duke Regional Airport
- IATA: LTW; ICAO: none; FAA LID: 2W6

Summary
- Airport type: Public
- Owner/Operator: St. Mary's County
- Location: Leonardtown, Maryland
- Elevation AMSL: 142 ft / 43 m

Map
- Location of airport in Maryland

Runways
Direction	Length		Surface
Direction	ft	m	Surface
11/29	4,150	1,265	Asphalt

Statistics (2023)
- Aircraft operations (year ending 3/14/2023): 40,308
- Based aircraft: 207
- Source: Federal Aviation Administration

St. Mary's County Regional Airport (IATA: LTW, FAA LID: 2W6), also known as Captain Walter Francis Duke Regional Airport, is a public airport located in St. Mary's County, Maryland, United States, four miles (six km) northeast of the central business district of Leonardtown. The airport is also located 8 nmi (15 km) west of Naval Air Station Patuxent River. It is owned and operated by the St. Mary's County Board of County Commissioners.

St. Mary's County Regional Airport has been in operation since 1969. The airport was re-dedicated as the Captain Walter Francis Duke Regional Airport in 2000. It recently reverted to its original name.

No commercial airlines operate scheduled flights at St. Mary's County Regional Airport, however, people can charter private flights here, making the airport public.

== Facilities and aircraft ==
St. Mary's County Regional Airport covers an area of 200 acres (81 ha) which contains one asphalt paved runway (11/29) measuring 4,150 x 75 ft (1,265 x 23 m).

For the 12-month period ending March 14, 2023, the airport had 40,308 aircraft operations, an average of 110 per day: 97% general aviation, 3% air taxi and <1% military. There was 207 aircraft based at this airport: 171 single engine, 19 multi-engine, 4 jet, 5 helicopters, 1 ultralight and 7 gliders.

The airport houses small aircraft such as Pipers, gliders, and Cessnas (152s, 172s, etc.). The Maryland State Police house one of their helicopters, Trooper 7, at the airport. Trooper 7 flies medevacs all over the area, as far north as Montgomery County and even into northern Virginia. There is also a small flying club where people can learn to fly and rent planes to fly over the Chesapeake Bay.

The St. Mary's Composite Squadron (MER-MD-089) of the Civil Air Patrol meets at the terminal building and bases their aircraft there as well. CAP's primary missions in the community include aerial and ground search and rescue. The local squadron is about 100 members strong, including senior members and cadets.

The St. Mary's County Chamber of Commerce has its offices in the terminal building of the airport. The Experimental Aircraft Association also meets there.

== See also ==
- List of airports in Maryland
