= Loveville, Maryland =

Unincorporated community in Maryland, U.S.

Coordinates: 38°21′43″N 76°40′59″W

Loveville is an unincorporated community in St. Mary's County, Maryland, United States, named for A. Kingsley Love, an attorney. It is known for its Old Order Mennonite community, who have a farmers' market/produce auction here, as well as craft shops and an annual quilt auction. Traditions of Loveville, an interior design and furniture store, occupies the Old Loveville Post Office Building. A Maryland Motor Vehicle Administration office is also located here. The postal code for Loveville is 20656

== See also ==
- Mennonites in Maryland
