= Great Mills, Maryland =

Unincorporated community in Maryland, U.S.

Coordinates: 38°14′12″N 76°29′50″W

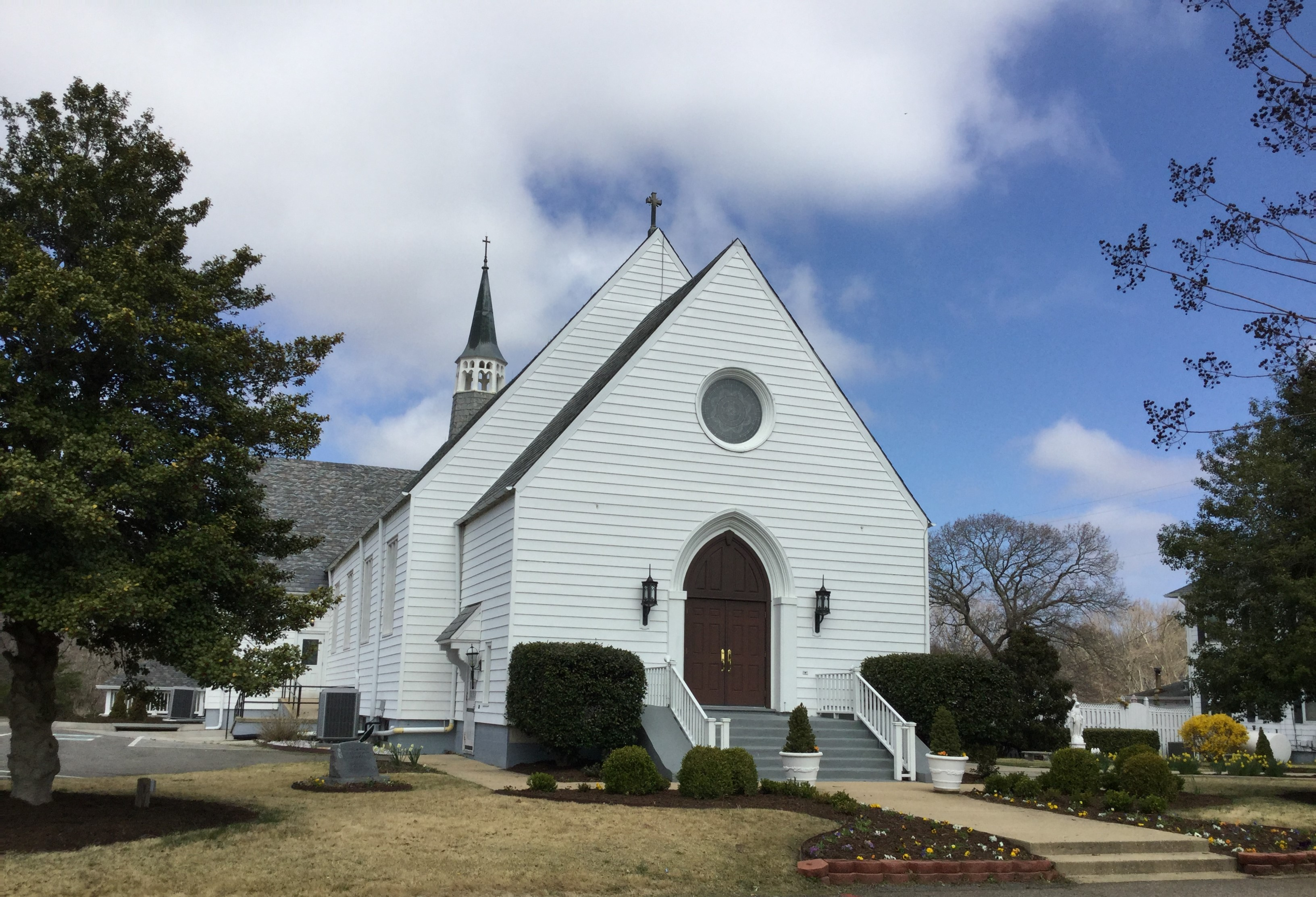
Front View of Holy Face church in Great Mills

Great Mills is an unincorporated community in St. Mary's County, Maryland, United States. Great Mills High School serves the lower end of the county, including the town (census CDP) of Lexington Park.

The area is site of some of the oldest agricultural settlements in Maryland, as well as English speaking North America. It had many links to the original Maryland colony in St. Mary's City.

It is also now a suburb of Lexington Park and the Patuxent River Naval Air Station.

== History ==
=== Early Colonial era: 17th century ===
The area was part of the original agricultural expansion after the initial settling of the first Maryland Colony in St. Mary's City, which is located several miles south of Great Mills. Early planters established farms in the area by the mid to late 17th century.

=== Civil War: Medal of Honor winners ===
Two Medal of Honor winners hail from Great Mills. William H. Barnes and James H. Harris were both free African-American farmers who grew up in Great Mills and served as soldiers in the Union Army during the American Civil War. They are both specifically mentioned and memorialized (including being discussed and depicted in a special permanent display) at the United States Colored Troops Memorial Statue which is just north of Great Mills in Lexington Park, Maryland.

The site is also a memorial to the more than 700 African-American soldiers and sailors from St. Mary's County, Maryland who served in the Union forces during the American Civil War (this is also discussed in the educational display). Special celebrations are also held there each year.

== Modern town area ==
Like most Maryland towns it has no local government, due to a history of strong county governance throughout the state as a whole. The legal term for this is "unincorporated area or township".

The area is rapidly developing and is home to commuters who work in Lexington Park and the nearby military base, as well as St. Mary's College of Maryland several miles to the south. Some residents also commute to Leonardtown, Maryland. There are still farming, fishing and crabbing communities in the area, although all of these are under economic pressure.

There is a public swimming pool adjacent. Great Mills Road, connecting the community with Lexington Park, has small shopping centers and small, low to middle-income housing developments. There is also a Big Park with office space, a playground, and space for sports.
