= California, Maryland =

- CDP
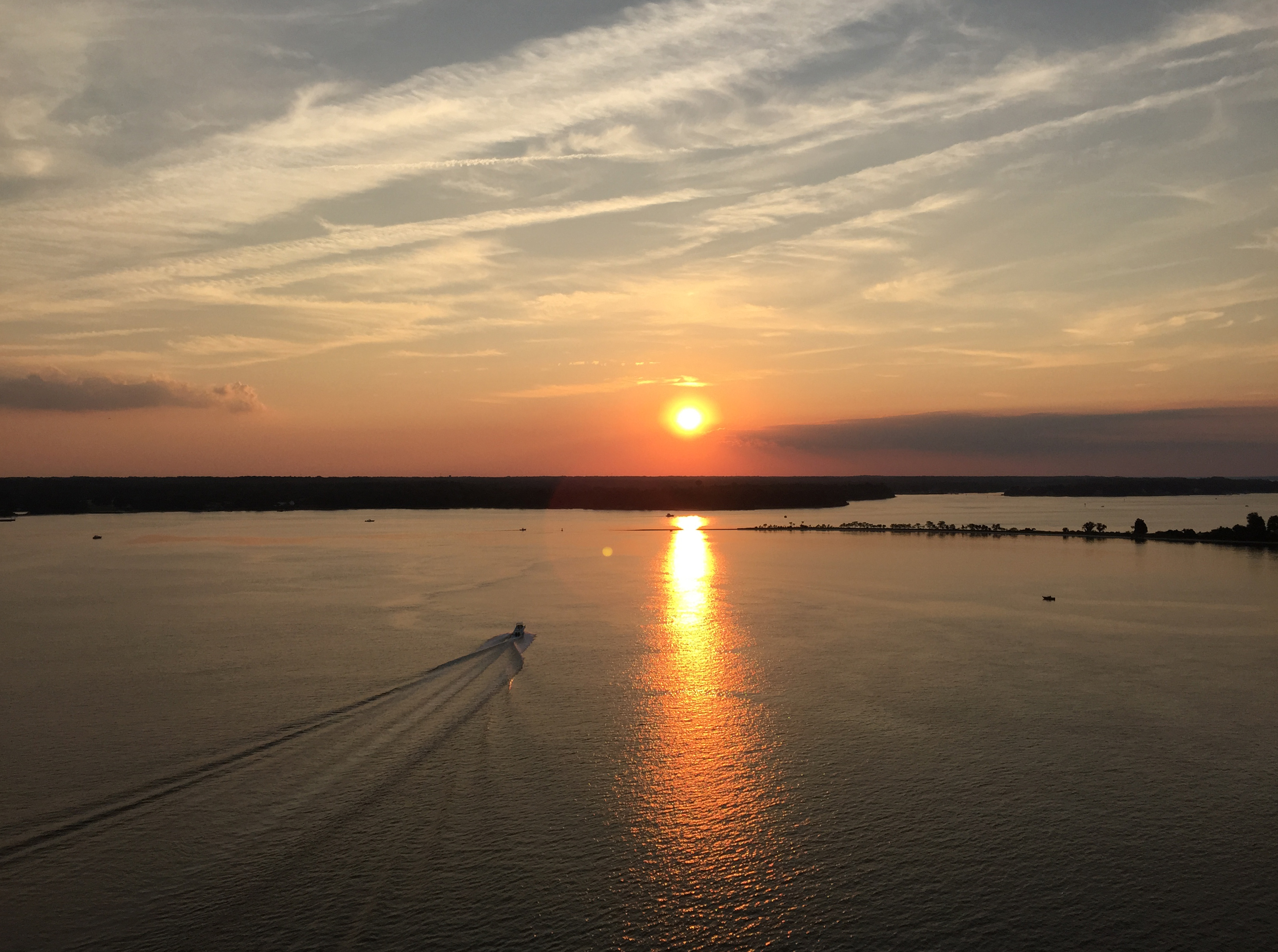
- Patuxent River from the Governor Thomas Johnson Bridge

- Location of California, Maryland
- Coordinates: 38°18′20″N 76°29′40″W
- Country: United States
- State: Maryland
- County: St. Mary's
- Named after: California

Area
  - Total: 14.98 sq mi (38.80 km^{2})
  - Land: 12.86 sq mi (33.32 km^{2})
  - Water: 2.12 sq mi (5.48 km^{2})
- Elevation: 108 ft (33 m)

Population (2020)
  - Total: 12,947
  - Density: 1,006.3/sq mi (388.53/km^{2})
- Time zone: UTC−5 (Eastern (EST))
  - Summer (DST): UTC−4 (EDT)
- ZIP code: 20619
- Area codes: 301, 240
- FIPS code: 24-12150
- GNIS feature ID: 0594621

California is a census-designated place and community in St. Mary's County, Maryland, United States. The population was 11,857 at the 2010 census, an increase of 27.4% from the 2000 census. There are department stores and numerous shopping centers situated along Maryland Highway 235 ("Three Notch Road"). Maryland Route 4 crosses Highway 235 in California, providing access to the narrow Governor Thomas Johnson Bridge and the popular weekend resort town of Solomons on its opposite side. Bridge-bound traffic is notorious for backing up during rush hour.

== History ==
California, Maryland, was named after the state of California before 1897. The exact origins of the name are unknown; however, one story is that a family from the state moved to the area, using materials from their home state to build their new house, called the “California Farmstead.” Eventually, the name stuck.

The community has been growing with the spread of population from the older adjacent community of Lexington Park and the growth in both technology-related and defense-related jobs at the Patuxent River Naval Air Station.

Historically rooted in farming and fishing along the Chesapeake Bay, the area has experienced a decades-long economic transformation. Employment is now largely concentrated at St. Mary's College of Maryland, in addition to the aforementioned Patuxent River Naval Air Station. The area has also seen a growing population of long-distance commuters to Washington, D.C.

== Geography ==
California is located at 38°18′20″N 76°29′40″W.

According to the United States Census Bureau, California has a total area of 14.8 square miles (38 km^{2}), of which 12.8 square miles (33 km^{2}) is land and 1.9 square miles (4.9 km^{2}) (12.64%) is water.

== Demographics ==
Historical population
Census	Pop.	Note	%±
1980	5,770		—
1990	7,626		32.2%
2000	9,307		22.0%
2010	11,857		27.4%
2020	12,947		9.2%

=== 2020 census ===
As of the 2020 census, California had a population of 12,947. The median age was 34.9 years. 24.2% of residents were under the age of 18 and 11.4% of residents were 65 years of age or older. For every 100 females there were 97.9 males, and for every 100 females age 18 and over there were 98.9 males age 18 and over.

92.1% of residents lived in urban areas, while 7.9% lived in rural areas.

There were 4,960 households in California, of which 33.2% had children under the age of 18 living in them. Of all households, 48.1% were married-couple households, 19.6% were households with a male householder and no spouse or partner present, and 24.9% were households with a female householder and no spouse or partner present. About 26.1% of all households were made up of individuals and 7.3% had someone living alone who was 65 years of age or older.

There were 5,330 housing units, of which 6.9% were vacant. The homeowner vacancy rate was 1.8% and the rental vacancy rate was 7.2%.

Racial composition as of the 2020 census
Race	Number	Percent
White	7,855	60.7%
Black or African American	2,621	20.2%
American Indian and Alaska Native	38	0.3%
Asian	685	5.3%
Native Hawaiian and Other Pacific Islander	17	0.1%
Some other race	326	2.5%
Two or more races	1,405	10.9%
Hispanic or Latino (of any race)	1,027	7.9%

=== 2010 census ===
As of the census of 2010, there were 11,857 people residing in California in 4,327 households. The population density was 928.1 inhabitants per square mile (358.3/km^{2}). There were 4,697 housing units and a 71.8% home ownership rate. The racial makeup was 70.7% White, 18.3% Black, 5.7% Hispanic or Latino, 4.6% Asian, 0.5% Indigenous American, and 0.1% Pacific Islander.

Of the 4,327 households, 42.7% had children under the age of 18 living in them, 57.2% had married couples, 9.9% had a female householder with no husband present, and 29.4% were non-families. 25.4% of all households were made up of individuals, and 4.1% had someone living alone who was 65 years of age or older. The average household size was 2.74 and the average family size was 3.31.

The population consisted of 29.8% under the age of 20, 6.6% from 20 to 24, 17.7% from 25 to 34, 17.3% from 35 to 44, 11.4% from 45 to 54, 10.5% from 55 to 64, and 6.5% who were 65 years of age or older. The median age was 32.5 years. The population was 49.1% male and 50.9% female.

=== Income and poverty ===
The median household income was $85,240 and the median family income was $91,935. Male full-time year-round workers had a median income of $63,657 versus $44,390 for females. The per capita income for the CDP was $35,386. Just 0.8% of families and 3.1% of people were below the poverty line, including 2.3% of people under age 18 and 4.8% of those age 65 or over. In 2017, California, Maryland was listed as the metropolitan area with the fourth highest number of households with investable assets above one million dollars. In 2019, Forbes Magazine listed California, Maryland as one of the best small places for business and careers in the nation with a ranking of 69.
