= Leonardtown, Maryland =

- Town
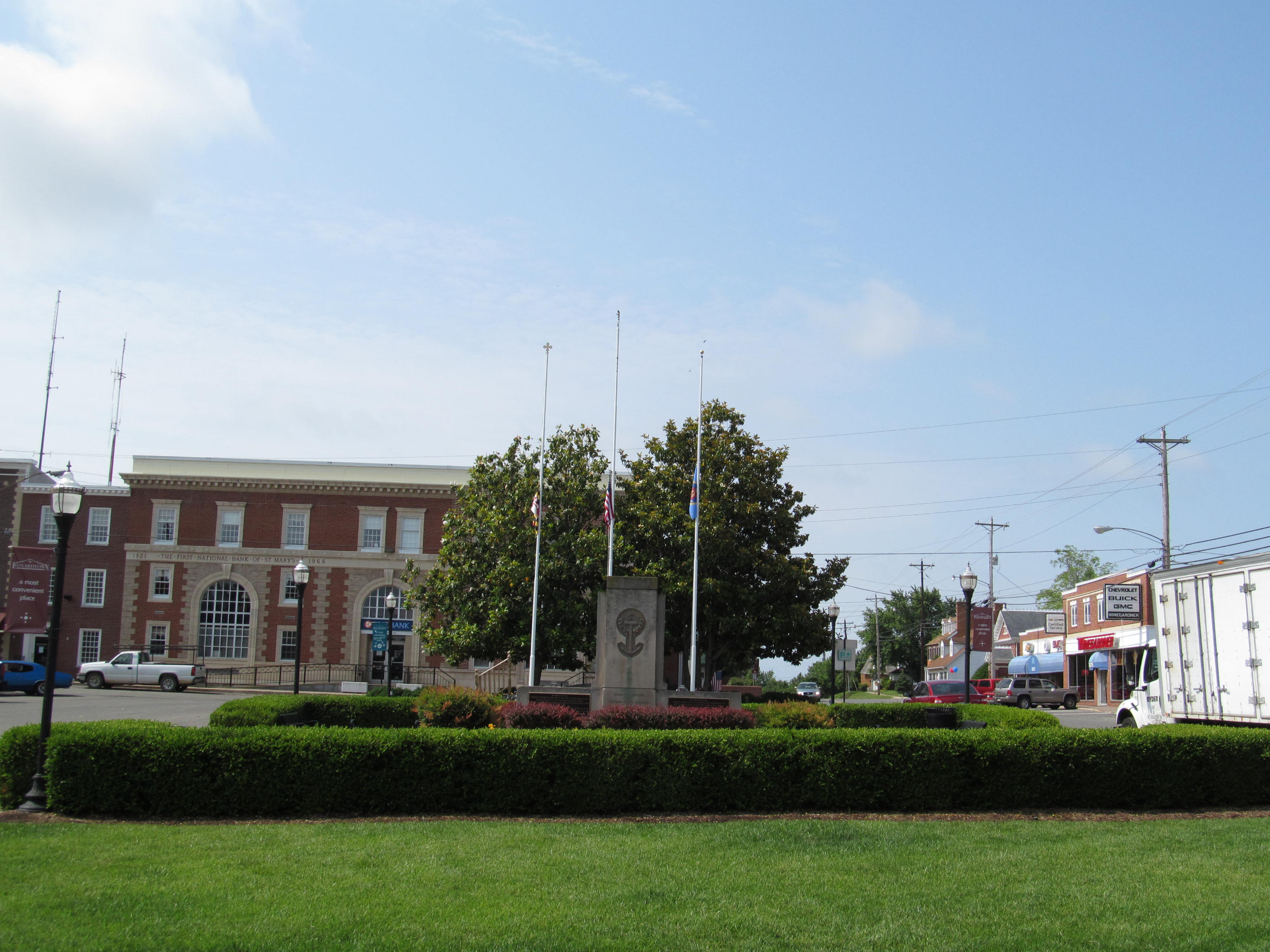
- Downtown Leonardtown in May 2012

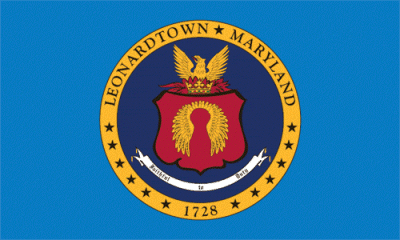
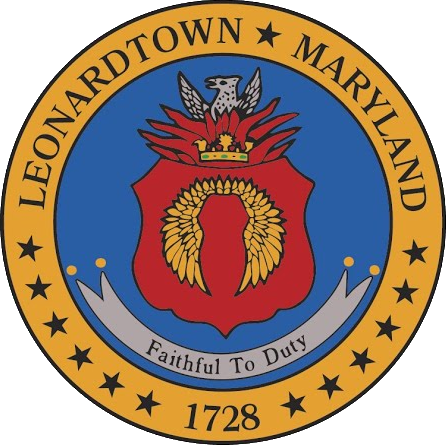
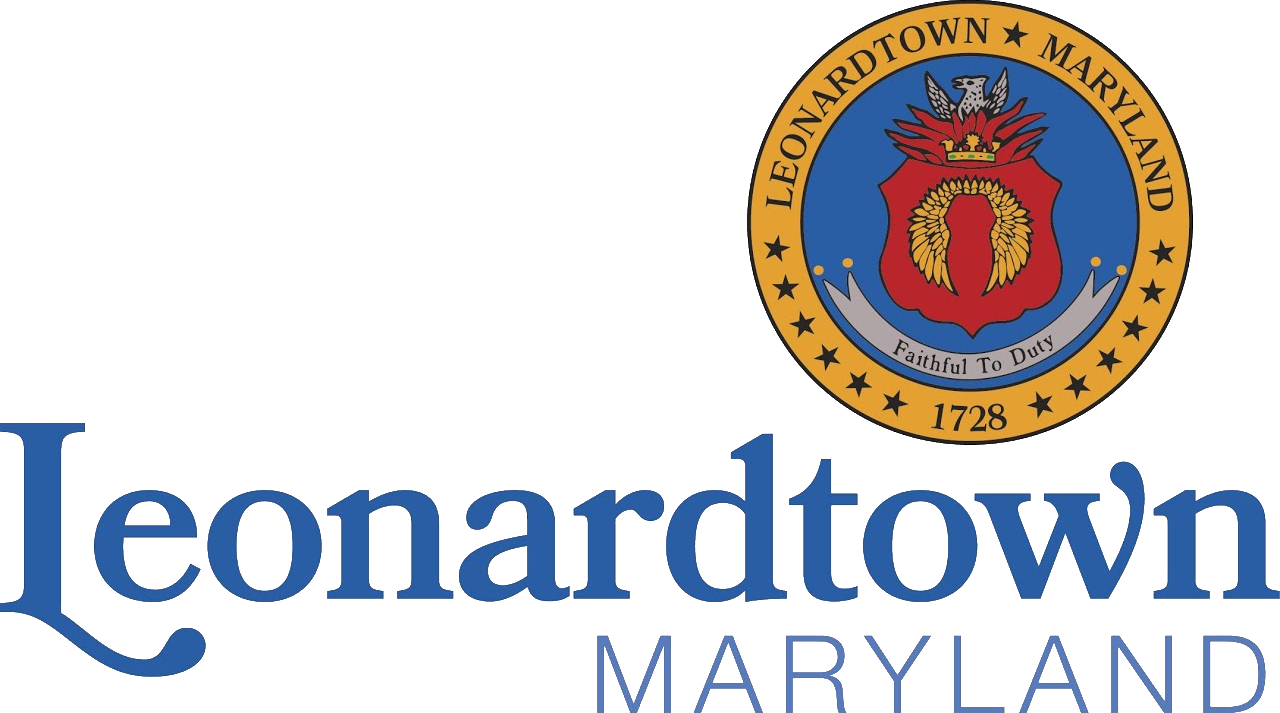
- Flag Seal Wordmark
- Motto: "Faithful to duty"
- Coordinates: 38°17′43″N 76°38′17″W
- Country: United States
- State: Maryland
- County: St. Mary's
- Founded: 1660 as Seymour Town
- Incorporation: 1858
- Named for: Leonard Calvert

Government
  - Type: Incorporated town

Area
  - Total: 3.88 sq mi (10.04 km^{2})
  - Land: 3.81 sq mi (9.87 km^{2})
  - Water: 0.069 sq mi (0.18 km^{2})
- Elevation: 85 ft (26 m)

Population (2020)
  - Total: 4,563
  - Density: 1,197.6/sq mi (462.38/km^{2})
- Time zone: UTC-5 (Eastern (EST))
  - Summer (DST): UTC-4 (EDT)
- ZIP code: 20650
- Area codes: 301, 240
- FIPS code: 24-46475
- GNIS feature ID: 0594790
- Website: http://leonardtown.somd.com

Leonardtown is a town in and the county seat of St. Mary's County, Maryland, United States. The population was 4,563 at the 2020 census.

Historic Leonardtown includes both a large public high school and a public middle school Leonardtown Middle School as well as a Catholic high school and an elementary school Leonardtown Elementary School, offices of the county government, and St. Mary's Hospital which serves the healthcare needs of the county. The College of Southern Maryland maintains a growing satellite campus within city limits, including an aquatic center. An upscale home development located in the Breton Bay area is just outside town, notable for both its country club golf course and swimming pool.

Leonardtown's population has grown significantly since 1990 as a result of the town's proximity to Patuxent River Naval Air Station and the Washington metro area.

== Geography ==
Leonardtown is located at 38°17′43″N 76°38′17″W (38.295332, -76.637939).

According to the United States Census Bureau, the town has a total area of 3.25 square miles (8.42 km^{2}), of which 3.18 square miles (8.24 km^{2}) is land and 0.07 square miles (0.18 km^{2}) is water.

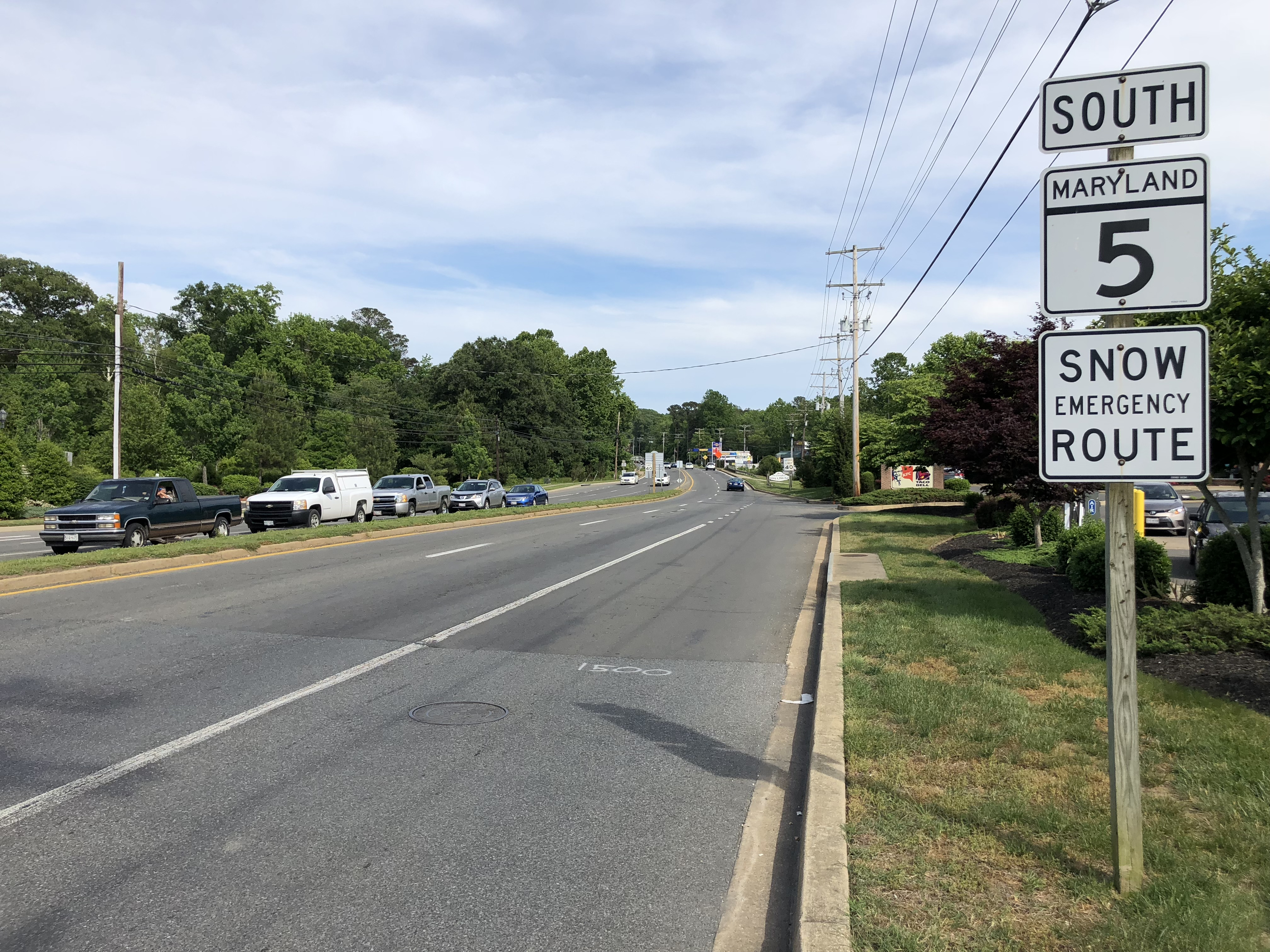
MD 5 southbound at MD 243 in Leonardtown

== Transportation ==
The primary method of travel to and from Leonardtown is by road, and three state highways serve the town directly. The most prominent of these is Maryland Route 5, which follows Point Lookout Road through Leonardtown. Heading north, MD 5 provides connections to U.S. Route 301 in Waldorf and Interstate 95/Interstate 495 (the Capital Beltway) near Washington, D.C. Heading south, MD 5 eventually reaches Point Lookout. The other two state highways serving the town directly are Maryland Route 245, which connects Leonardtown to Maryland Route 235 in Hollywood, and Maryland Route 243, which passes Compton before ending at Newtowne Neck State Park. Although not directly serving Leonardtown, MD 5 also has junctions with Maryland Route 4 and Maryland Route 234 just outside the town limits.

== History ==
=== Early history ===
Records indicate that by 1654, county court was conducted at the house of John Hammond in the area known as "Newtown" or "Newtowne Hundred". During the late 17th century, it appears that court was held at various homes throughout Newtown, and that it was only in 1708 that an official town with a designated courthouse was established. It was during this same year that Phillip Lynes, then Mayor of St. Mary's City, Maryland's colonial capital, designated fifty acres of land at the head of "Brittons Bay" to be divided into 100 lots. He further ordered that one lot be set aside for a county courthouse to be built at an expense not to exceed 12,000 pounds of tobacco. At this time, Newtown was promptly renamed Seymour Town in honor of Governor John Seymour. Nearly 20 years later, Seymour Town was renamed again to Leonard Town in honor of Leonard Calvert, who was Maryland's first governor.

In the decades that followed, Leonard Town became the place where local residents conducted their official business with the colony. Farm products were regularly shipped through the port.

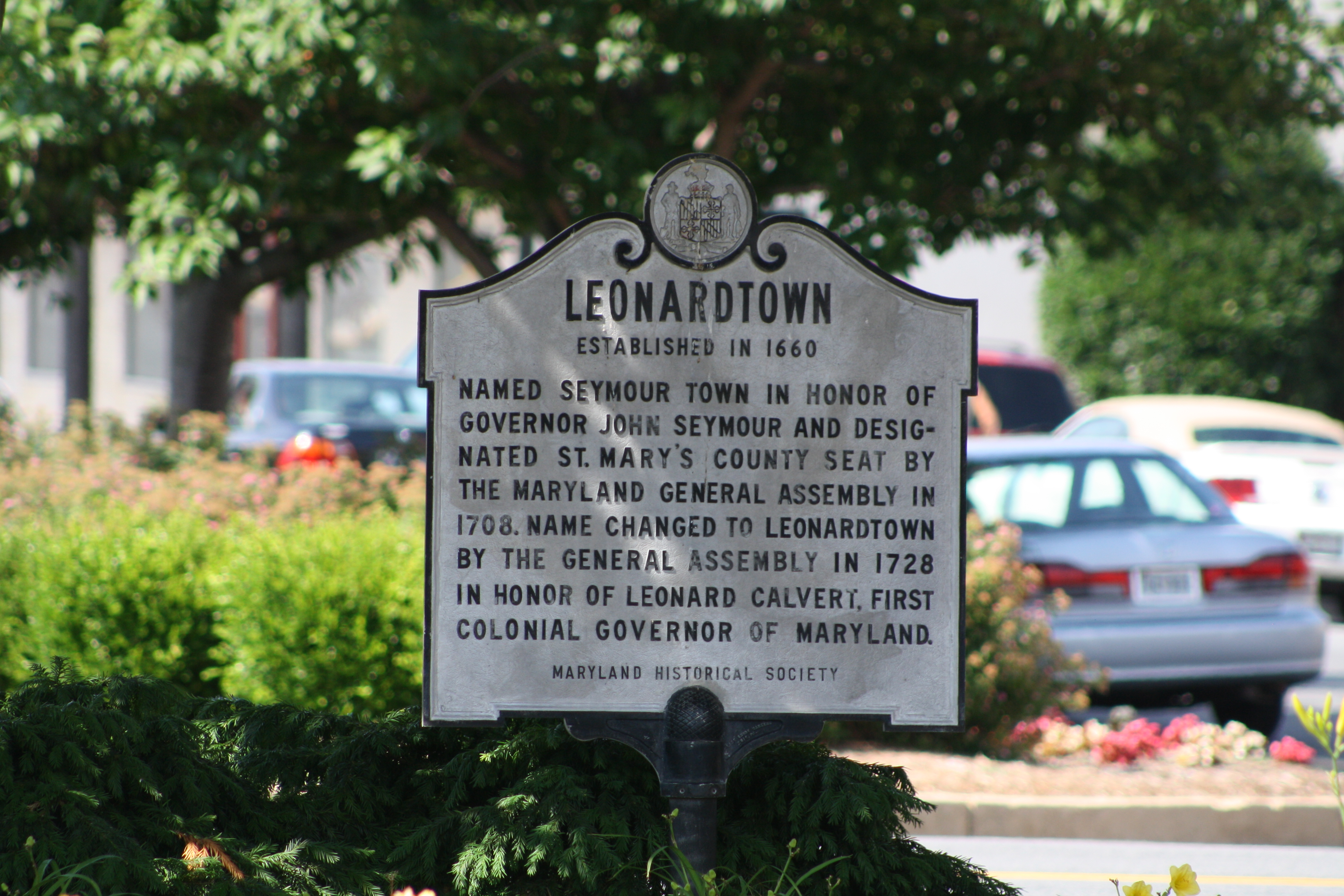
Maryland Historic Society's Leonardtown marker

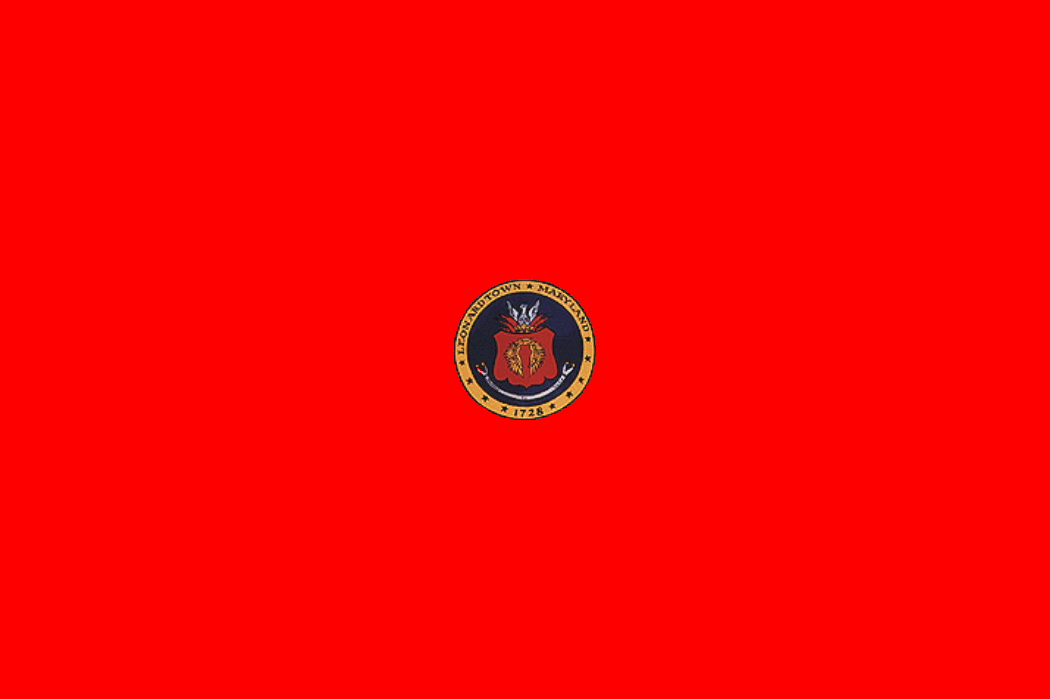
Town flag from 1975 to 1989.

=== The 19th century ===
During the War of 1812, the British blockaded the Chesapeake Bay. 1,000 British Marines invaded the town. This crippled the Tidewater economy and subjected areas to repeated British plundering and destruction. By 1860, the town had approximately 35 dwellings within these corporate limits. It was home to the county's newspaper, two hotels and several stores. During the American Civil War, a Union Naval contingent occupied Leonardtown, searching all houses for weapons and supplies intended for shipment across the Potomac River to Virginia as Southern Maryland and the town's sympathies lay with the Confederacy. Leonardtown served as a busy port and steamboat landing. Until the passing of the steamboat era, steamboats carried goods and passengers all over the Chesapeake Bay area well into the 20th century, and a floating theater docked each year at the port, providing entertainment.

=== The 20th century to the present ===
Historic Leonardtown remains the only incorporated municipality in St. Mary's County with its own elected mayor and town council. The town is experiencing a renaissance of its downtown as witnessed by recent openings of several new restaurants and businesses, some of which are located in historic buildings. An old order Mennonite farming community is located a few miles to the northwest, where community members sell furniture, crafts, produce, and other homemade/home grown products. A large, modern public library and seniors center opened in 2021. The Leonardtown Wharf waterfront park opened as a public attraction for both locals and tourists in May 2008. Facilities for boating, kayaking and canoeing are also planned. The Naval Air Base located at Patuxent River has boosted the economy in Leonardtown significantly. Many families have relocated to Leonardtown as a result of the base.

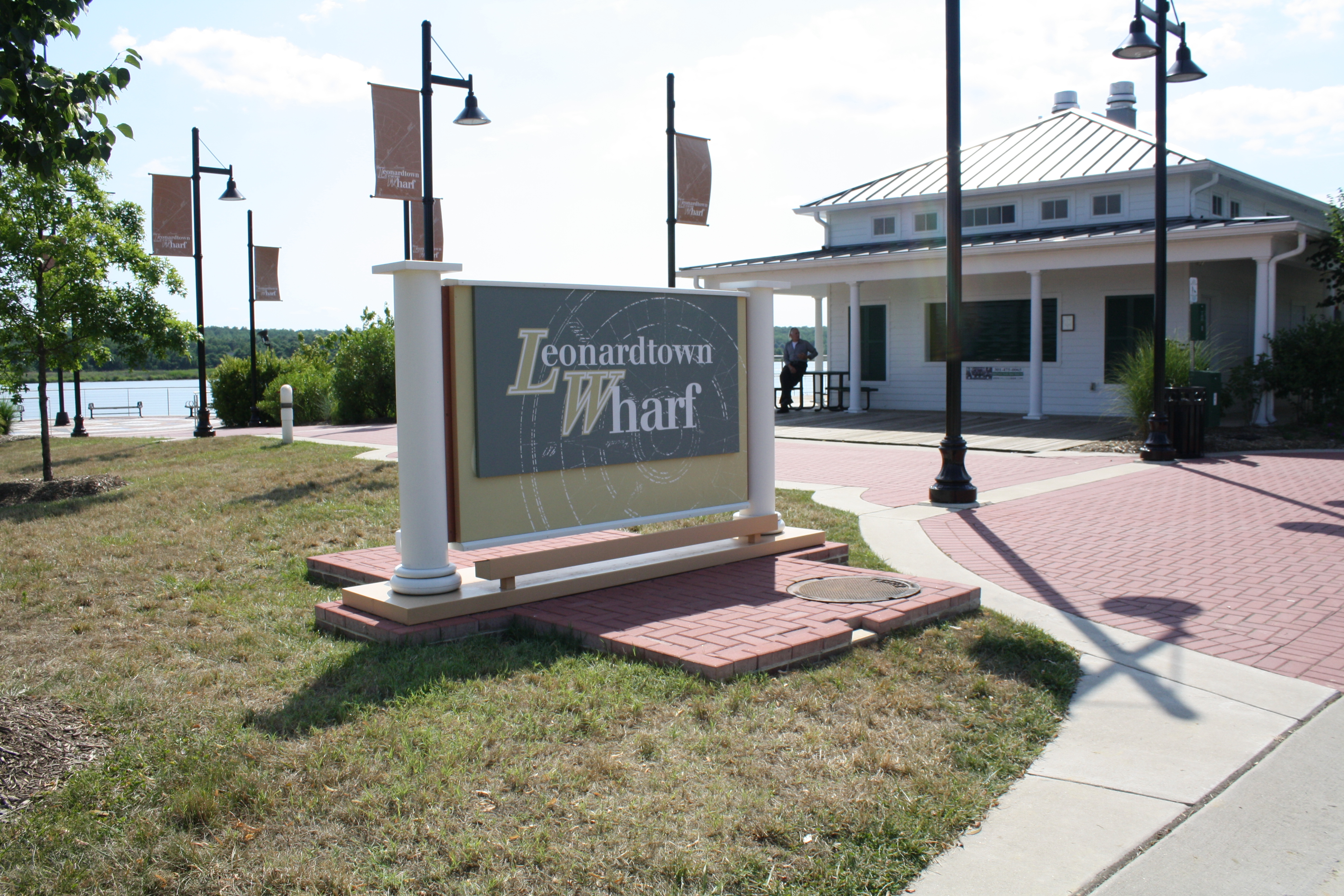
Entrance to the Leonardtown Wharf

St. Andrew's Church and Tudor Hall were listed on the National Register of Historic Places in 1973.

The United States National Oyster Festival, which hosts an annual oyster shucking competition, has been held annually in Leonardtown since 1967.

== Demographics ==
Historical population
Census	Pop.	Note	%±
1860	568		—
1870	485		−14.6%
1880	465		−4.1%
1890	521		12.0%
1900	463		−11.1%
1910	526		13.6%
1920	557		5.9%
1930	697		25.1%
1940	668		−4.2%
1950	1,017		52.2%
1960	1,281		26.0%
1970	1,406		9.8%
1980	1,448		3.0%
1990	1,475		1.9%
2000	1,896		28.5%
2010	2,930		54.5%
2020	4,563		55.7%
U.S. Decennial Census

=== 2020 census ===
As of the 2020 census, Leonardtown had a population of 4,563. The median age was 38.0 years. 28.3% of residents were under the age of 18 and 15.2% of residents were 65 years of age or older. For every 100 females there were 95.2 males, and for every 100 females age 18 and over there were 89.8 males age 18 and over.

99.3% of residents lived in urban areas, while 0.7% lived in rural areas.

There were 1,614 households in Leonardtown, of which 45.0% had children under the age of 18 living in them. Of all households, 51.4% were married-couple households, 15.3% were households with a male householder and no spouse or partner present, and 27.6% were households with a female householder and no spouse or partner present. About 28.5% of all households were made up of individuals and 16.9% had someone living alone who was 65 years of age or older.

There were 1,763 housing units, of which 8.5% were vacant. The homeowner vacancy rate was 1.0% and the rental vacancy rate was 9.1%.

Racial composition as of the 2020 census
Race	Number	Percent
White	3,367	73.8%
Black or African American	531	11.6%
American Indian and Alaska Native	16	0.4%
Asian	150	3.3%
Native Hawaiian and Other Pacific Islander	5	0.1%
Some other race	77	1.7%
Two or more races	417	9.1%
Hispanic or Latino (of any race)	247	5.4%

=== 2010 census ===
As of the census of 2010, there were 2,930 people, 1,067 households, and 614 families living in the town. The population density was 921.4 inhabitants per square mile (355.8/km^{2}). There were 1,156 housing units at an average density of 363.5 units per square mile (140.3 units/km^{2}). The racial makeup of the town was 77.0% White, 14.9% African American, 0.9% Native American, 2.7% Asian, 1.2% from other races, and 3.4% from two or more races. Hispanic or Latino people of any race were 3.6% of the population.

There were 1,067 households, of which 32.1% had children under the age of 18 living with them, 42.6% were married couples living together, 12.1% had a female householder with no husband present, 2.8% had a male householder with no wife present, and 42.5% were non-families. 37.3% of all households were made up of individuals, and 22% had someone living alone who was 65 years of age or older. The average household size was 2.35 and the average family size was 3.15.

The median age in the town was 40.8 years. 23.2% of residents were under the age of 18; 8% were between the ages of 18 and 24; 25.1% were from 25 to 44; 24.2% were from 45 to 64; and 19.5% were 65 years of age or older. The gender makeup of the town was 48.7% male and 51.3% female.

=== 2000 census ===
As of the census of 2000, there were 1,896 people, 598 households, and 367 families living in the town. The population density was 611.0 inhabitants per square mile (235.9/km^{2}). There were 646 housing units at an average density of 208.2 units per square mile (80.4 units/km^{2}). The racial makeup of the town was 70.78% White, 26.00% African American, 0.11% Native American, 1.48% Asian, 0.37% from other races, and 1.27% from two or more races. Hispanic or Latino people of any race were 0.84% of the population.

There were 598 households, out of which 26.3% had children under the age of 18 living with them, 40.8% were married couples living together, 16.7% had a female householder with no husband present, and 38.5% were non-families. 33.4% of all households were made up of individuals, and 16.6% had someone living alone who was 65 years of age or older. The average household size was 2.22 and the average family size was 2.80.

In the town, the population was spread out, with 15.9% under the age of 18, 7.0% from 18 to 24, 28.3% from 25 to 44, 18.3% from 45 to 64, and 30.5% who were 65 years of age or older. The median age was 44 years. For every 100 females, there were 83.0 males. For every 100 females age 18 and over, there were 78.9 males.

The median income for a household in the town was $35,563, and the median income for a family was $42,083. Males had a median income of $35,417 versus $25,125 for females. The per capita income for the town was $16,614. About 12.9% of families and 21.8% of the population were below the poverty line, including 23.9% of those under age 18 and 19.9% of those age 65 or over.

== See also ==
- Moll Dyer
- St. Mary's County
- Southern Maryland
- Patuxent River Naval Air Station
- St. Mary's County Public Schools
- Leonardtown High School
- St. Mary's Ryken High School
