= Lexington Park, Maryland =

- CDP
- Location of Lexington Park, Maryland
- Coordinates: 38°15′32″N 76°27′2″W
- Country: United States
- State: Maryland
- County: St. Mary's

Area
  - Total: 6.07 sq mi (15.73 km^{2})
  - Land: 6.07 sq mi (15.71 km^{2})
  - Water: 0.0077 sq mi (0.02 km^{2})
- Elevation: 115 ft (35 m)

Population (2020)
  - Total: 13,318
  - Density: 2,195.9/sq mi (847.86/km^{2})
- Time zone: UTC−5 (Eastern (EST))
  - Summer (DST): UTC−4 (EDT)
- ZIP code: 20653
- Area code: 301/240
- FIPS code: 24-46725
- GNIS feature ID: 0594792

Lexington Park is a census-designated place (CDP) in St. Mary's County, Maryland, United States, and the principal community of the Lexington Park, Maryland Micropolitan Statistical Area. The population was 11,626 at the 2010 census.

== History ==
=== Native American presence ===
Native American peoples inhabited the area as early as 3500 B.C. At the time of the arrival of the first colonists, the area was inhabited by various tribes and polities such as the Piscataway Confederacy, Yaocomico, Mattawoman, Pamunkey, Mattaponi and Nanjemoy.

=== Colonial era ===
The area was expanded into by "planters" (mostly tobacco farmers) who moved into the area as the original settlement in St. Mary's City grew. Early plantations were first farmed by indentured and free labor, but in the late 1600s slavery began to establish itself in Maryland and the character of farming changed due to this. Wealth was concentrated in very few hands and small free farmers and laborers were pushed out or "down" (into poverty) due to competition with slave labor.

=== Pre-1940s community ===
Before the establishment of the Patuxent Naval Air Station, there were tobacco farms in what is now Lexington Park, or the base proper, and also crabbing, fishing and oyster harvesting communities in the waterfront areas. Many residents of these communities had roots going back more than 300 years in the area. Many were pushed out by eminent domain land seizures during World War Two, in order to create the new military base. Memories of this loss are still strong among older county residents. The economic boost brought by the base was welcome, but many never felt sufficiently compensated for the loss of their centuries-old homes, landholdings and fishing and farming community.

Nearby, Dashiell Hammett, noted novelist, was born on May 27, 1894.

=== World War Two: Advent of naval base spurs establishment of "Lexington Park" ===
"Lexington Park" came into being in 1943 with the establishment of the Patuxent Naval Air Station during World War II, and was named for the recently sunk USS Lexington aircraft carrier. Prior to this Lexington Park was called "Jarboesville". John Glenn, Alan Shepard, and many noted astronauts trained there. In 1977 the Governor Thomas Johnson Bridge spanning the Patuxent River linked the area to Calvert County and Solomons, Maryland.

In recent years several aerospace and high-tech companies have located in the area bringing additional jobs. Continually expanding shopping centers along Maryland Route 235 ("Three Notch Road") and Great Mills Road have many department stores.

== Economy ==
=== Town ===
Lexington Park in bayside St. Mary's County is one of the nation's fastest-growing "micropolitan" areas, expanding by 14.6 percent since 2000, largely on the strength of military growth. The county population surpassed 100,000 in 2010. In addition, Southern Maryland is the fast-growing area in the state, and a popular bedroom community for people who work in the District of Columbia, but unlike neighboring Charles and Calvert counties, many in St. Mary's County both work and live in the county.

=== Base ===
The Patuxent River Naval Air Station, which is based in Lexington Park, employs about 20,000 people, driving about 75 percent of the economy in St. Mary's County and providing roughly $3 billion to the state economy.

=== Civilian home prices ===
The average price of a home in St. Mary's County in 2014 is $252,100, compared with $337,501 in 2007, and about $200,000 in 2003. The area is surrounded by farmland and has a countryside charm with a historical appeal. In addition, there are many high tech jobs.

== Area schools ==
=== Elementary and secondary schools ===
Lexington Park's public schools are part of the St. Mary's County Public Schools. The schools in town include Town Creek Elementary, Greenview Knolls Elementary, Lexington Park Elementary, George Washington Carver Elementary, Esperanza Middle, and Spring Ridge Middle. Great Mills High, Chesapeake Public Charter, and Fairlead Academy are also close by in neighboring Great Mills.

=== Higher education ===
==== St. Mary's College of Maryland ====
St. Mary's College of Maryland is located seven miles south of Lexington Park and is one of only two public honors colleges in the nation.

It is ranked "5th in the nation" under the "public colleges" category by U.S. News & World Report.

It is also ranked "4th in the nation" under the category of "Best schools for veterans" by U.S. News & World Report.

==== College of Southern Maryland ====
The College of Southern Maryland, a community college, offers classes in and near the area.

==== Merchant Marine academy ====
The Paul Hall Center for Maritime Studies (a merchant marine academy) is only about 20 minutes away.

== Notable historic sites ==
=== Archeological sites ===
Mattapany-Sewall Archeological Site was listed on the National Register of Historic Places in 1985.

Other archeological research is done periodically on parts of the naval base (and its adjacent waters), focusing on Civil War, War of 1812 and colonial research.

=== United States Colored Troops Memorial Statue ===
The United States Colored Troops Memorial Statue is located in Lexington Park. It is a nationally recognized memorial to the more than 700 African-American soldiers and sailors from St. Mary's County who served in the Union forces during the Civil War. The memorial also includes an educational display. Special celebrations are also held there each year.

The mission of the site is to welcome people of all backgrounds, to honor those who served and to tell their story. The memorial is located in John G. Lancaster Park on 21550 Willows Road.

=== St. Richards Manor ===
St. Richard's Manor was listed on the National Register of Historic Places in 1985.

=== Historic St. Mary's City ===
Historic St. Mary's City, seven miles south of Lexington Park, is the site of the founding of the Maryland colony as well as being recognized as the birthplace of religious freedom in America. It is now a reconstructed colonial town, a museum complex, and a center for living history. It also features the Maryland Dove, a full-sized working replica of the sailing ship that bore the first colonists to the new Maryland colony.

The complex shows what colonial life was like in what is now Lexington Park as well as both areas were originally part of the same settlement.

== Geography ==
Lexington Park is located at 38°15′32″N 76°27′2″W (38.258906, −76.450592).

According to the United States Census Bureau, the CDP has a total area of 8.1 square miles (21 km^{2}), of which 8.0 square miles (21 km^{2}) is land and 0.1 square miles (0.26 km^{2}) (1.24%) is water.

=== Climate ===
Lexington Park has a humid subtropical climate under the Köppen climate classification, with hot, humid summers and mild winters.

Climate data for Lexington Park, Maryland
Month	Jan	Feb	Mar	Apr	May	Jun	Jul	Aug	Sep	Oct	Nov	Dec	Year
Record high °F (°C)	82 (28)	81 (27)	88 (31)	93 (34)	100 (38)	102 (39)	104 (40)	103 (39)	99 (37)	93 (34)	85 (29)	81 (27)	104 (40)
Mean daily maximum °F (°C)	44.3 (6.8)	46.9 (8.3)	54.9 (12.7)	65.3 (18.5)	74.2 (23.4)	82.8 (28.2)	86.9 (30.5)	85.0 (29.4)	78.8 (26.0)	68.3 (20.2)	58.7 (14.8)	48.4 (9.1)	66.2 (18.0)
Daily mean °F (°C)	36.1 (2.3)	38.2 (3.4)	45.6 (7.6)	55.4 (13.0)	64.7 (18.2)	73.7 (23.2)	78.1 (25.6)	76.6 (24.8)	70.1 (21.2)	59.2 (15.1)	49.7 (9.8)	40.1 (4.5)	57.3 (14.1)
Mean daily minimum °F (°C)	28.0 (−2.2)	29.5 (−1.4)	36.2 (2.3)	45.5 (7.5)	55.2 (12.9)	64.7 (18.2)	69.4 (20.8)	68.2 (20.1)	61.5 (16.4)	50.0 (10.0)	40.7 (4.8)	31.7 (−0.2)	48.4 (9.1)
Record low °F (°C)	−3 (−19)	4 (−16)	10 (−12)	26 (−3)	36 (2)	44 (7)	54 (12)	52 (11)	44 (7)	30 (−1)	16 (−9)	6 (−14)	−3 (−19)
Average precipitation inches (mm)	3.32 (84)	2.94 (75)	4.61 (117)	3.85 (98)	3.80 (97)	4.31 (109)	4.59 (117)	4.35 (110)	4.55 (116)	3.34 (85)	3.28 (83)	3.71 (94)	46.65 (1,185)

== Demographics ==
Historical population
Census	Pop.	Note	%±
2000	11,021		—
2010	11,626		5.5%
2020	13,317		14.5%
U.S. Decennial Census

=== 2020 census ===
As of the 2020 census, Lexington Park had a population of 13,317. The median age was 31.6 years. 24.3% of residents were under the age of 18 and 7.7% of residents were 65 years of age or older. For every 100 females there were 100.7 males, and for every 100 females age 18 and over there were 96.6 males age 18 and over.

100.0% of residents lived in urban areas, while 0.0% lived in rural areas.

There were 5,473 households in Lexington Park, of which 30.6% had children under the age of 18 living in them. Of all households, 35.8% were married-couple households, 26.2% were households with a male householder and no spouse or partner present, and 29.1% were households with a female householder and no spouse or partner present. About 33.2% of all households were made up of individuals and 5.8% had someone living alone who was 65 years of age or older.

There were 5,920 housing units, of which 7.6% were vacant. The homeowner vacancy rate was 1.8% and the rental vacancy rate was 8.3%.

Racial composition as of the 2020 census
Race	Number	Percent
White	6,198	46.5%
Black or African American	4,416	33.2%
American Indian and Alaska Native	74	0.6%
Asian	673	5.1%
Native Hawaiian and Other Pacific Islander	16	0.1%
Some other race	513	3.9%
Two or more races	1,427	10.7%
Hispanic or Latino (of any race)	1,276	9.6%

=== 2000 census ===
As of the census of 2000, there were 11,021 people, 3,923 households, and 2,459 families residing in the CDP. The population density was 1,378.9 inhabitants per square mile (532.4/km^{2}). There were 4,630 housing units at an average density of 579.3 per square mile (223.7/km^{2}). The racial makeup of the CDP was 59.99% White, 30.00% African American, 0.38% Native American, 4.22% Asian, 0.12% Pacific Islander, 1.81% from other races, and 3.48% from two or more races. Hispanic or Latino of any race were 4.78% of the population.

There were 3,923 households, out of which 41.8% had children under the age of 18 living with them, 43.9% were married couples living together, 14.7% had a female householder with no husband present, and 37.3% were non-families. 29.5% of all households were made up of individuals, and 2.1% had someone living alone who was 65 years of age or older. The average household size was 2.65 and the average family size was 3.34.

In the CDP, the population was spread out, with 31.5% under the age of 18, 14.0% from 18 to 24, 39.3% from 25 to 44, 12.2% from 45 to 64, and 3.1% who were 65 years of age or older. The median age was 27 years. For every 100 females, there were 114.5 males. For every 100 females age 18 and over, there were 120.5 males.

The median income for a household in the CDP was $39,214, and the median income for a family was $42,095. Males had a median income of $30,762 versus $24,155 for females. The per capita income for the CDP was $17,605. About 9.9% of families and 11.9% of the population were below the poverty line, including 14.4% of those under age 18 and 10.6% of those age 65 or over.
