= Maryland Route 242 =

State highway in Maryland, United States

Maryland Route 242
- Colton Point Road

Route information
- Maintained by MDSHA
- Length: 12.80 mi (20.60 km)
- Existed: 1927–present
- Tourist routes: Religious Freedom Byway

Major junctions
- South end: Beach Road / Point Breeze Road in Coltons Point
- MD 470 at Avenue; MD 239 near Bushwood; MD 238 near Bushwood; MD 234 at Clements
- North end: MD 5 at Morganza

Location
- Country: United States
- State: Maryland
- Counties: St. Mary's

Highway system
- Maryland highway system; Interstate; US; State; Scenic Byways
← MD 239	→ MD 243

Maryland Route 242 (MD 242) is a state highway in the U.S. state of Maryland. Known as Colton Point Road, the state highway runs 12.80 miles (20.60 km) from Coltons Point north to MD 5 in Morganza. MD 242 connects the communities of Morganza, Clements, Bushwood, Avenue, and Coltons Point in western St. Mary's County. The state highway also leads to St. Clement's Island State Park, the site of Maryland's First Landing. MD 242 was constructed in the early 1920s.

== Route description ==
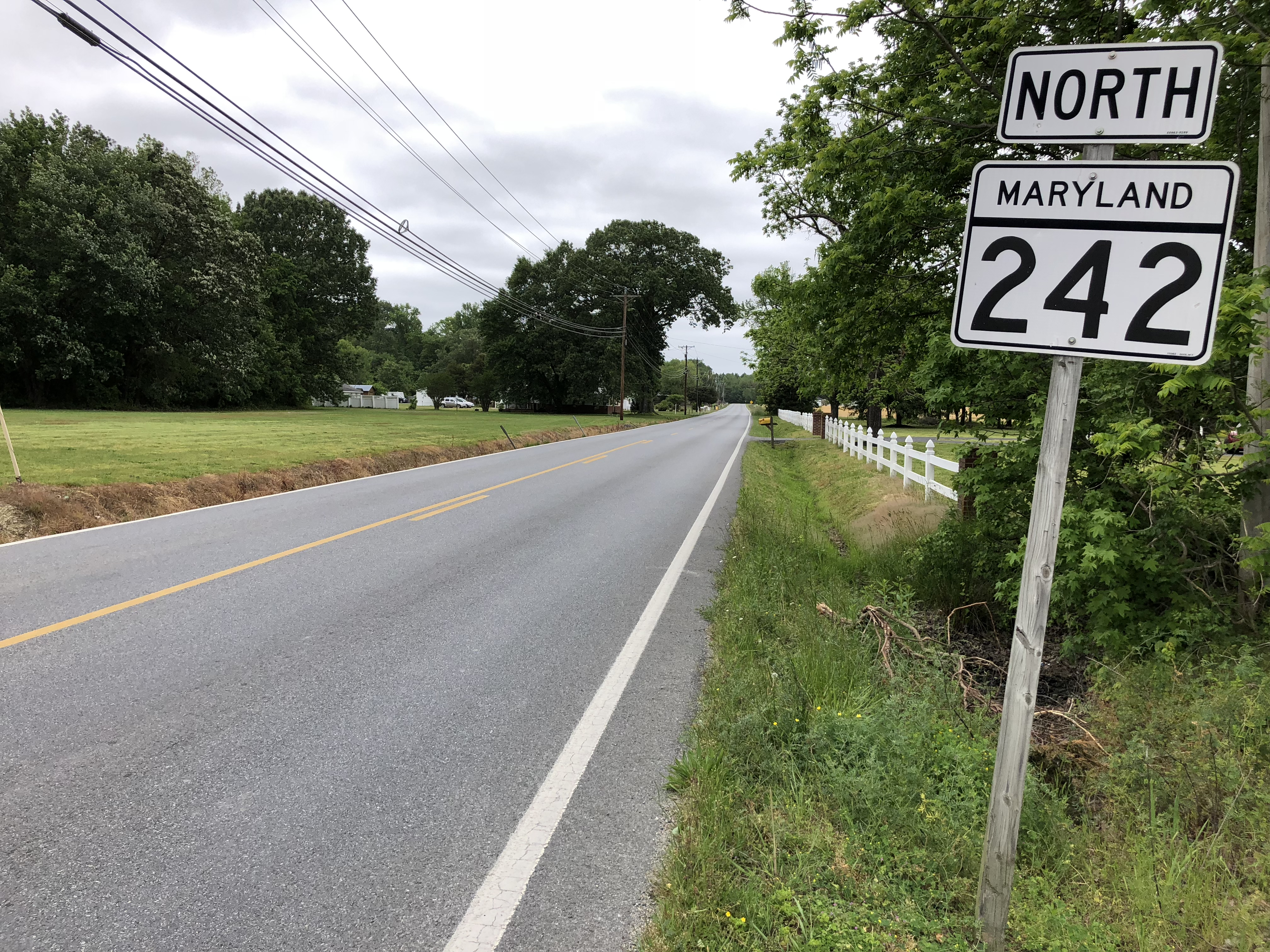
View north along MD 242 at MD 239 in Milestown

MD 242 begins at the intersection of Beach Road and Point Breeze Road in a residential neighborhood at Coltons Point on the shore of the Potomac River. Point Breeze Road heads east toward the St. Clements Island–Potomac River Museum, which is the embarkation point for seasonal boat tours to St. Clement's Island State Park, the site of Maryland's First Landing that includes the Blakistone Island Light. MD 242 heads northwest as a two-lane undivided road through a mix of farmland and forest and scattered residences along the parallel St. Patrick's Creek. The state highway veers north through the community of Avenue, where the highway intersects the southern end of MD 470 (Oakley Road) and the western end of Abell Road. MD 242 continues northwest through a forested area and turns north again at the eastern terminus of MD 239 (Bushwood Wharf Road) near the community of Bushwood. The state highway veers northeast and intersects the southern terminus of MD 238 (Maddox Road) in the hamlet of Milestown before crossing Tomakokin Creek. MD 242 meets the northern end of MD 470 (Oakley Road) just south of the hamlet of Dynard. The state highway crosses Dynard Run and parallels St. Clements Creek before arriving in the community of Clements, where the highway comes to a roundabout with MD 234 (Budds Creek Road), which connects Leonardtown to the east with U.S. Route 301 and the Governor Harry W. Nice Memorial Bridge to the west. A park and ride lot is located at the northwest corner of this roundabout. MD 242 leaves Clements heading north then curves to the east and crosses St. Clements Creek. The state highway heads northeast through farmland, crossing Locust Run before passing west of Chopticon High School. MD 242 reaches its northern terminus at MD 5 (Point Lookout Road) in the community of Morganza. The highway continues north as county-maintained Morganza–Turner Road.

== History ==
MD 242 was constructed as a gravel road from Morganza to Avenue by 1921 and completed to Coltons Point in 1923. The state highway was reconstructed with curve modifications and a bituminous-stabilized gravel surface in the 1950s, beginning with the Morganza–Clements section in 1949 and 1950. MD 242 was rebuilt from Clements to Bushwood by 1959.

== Junction list ==
The entire route is in St. Mary's County.

Location	mi	km	Destinations	Notes
Coltons Point	0.00	0.00	Beach Road west / Point Breeze Road east	Southern terminus
Avenue	3.01	4.84	MD 470 north (Oakley Road) – Oakley	Southern terminus of MD 470
Bushwood	4.37	7.03	MD 239 west (Bushwood Wharf Road)	Eastern terminus of MD 239
Bushwood	5.34	8.59	MD 238 north (Maddox Road) – Maddox, Chaptico	Southern terminus of MD 238
Dynard	6.91	11.12	MD 470 south (Oakley Road) – Oakley	Northern terminus of MD 470
Clements	8.83	14.21	MD 234 (Budds Creek Road) to US 301 – Leonardtown, Potomac River Bridge	Roundabout
Morganza	12.80	20.60	MD 5 (Point Lookout Road) / Morganza–Turner Road north – Leonardtown, Waldorf	Northern terminus
1.000 mi = 1.609 km; 1.000 km = 0.621 mi
