= Maryland Route 234 =

State highway in Maryland, USA

Maryland Route 234
- Budds Creek Road
- Map of Southern Maryland with MD 234 highlighted in red

Route information
- Maintained by MDSHA
- Length: 19.02 mi (30.61 km)
- Existed: 1927–present
- Tourist routes: Religious Freedom Byway

Major junctions
- West end: US 301 in Allens Fresh
- MD 236 in Budds Creek; MD 238 in Chaptico; MD 242 in Clements
- East end: MD 5 in Leonardtown

Location
- Country: United States
- State: Maryland
- Counties: Charles, St. Mary's

Highway system
- Maryland highway system; Interstate; US; State; Scenic Byways
← MD 231	→ MD 235

Maryland Route 234 (MD 234) is a state highway in the U.S. state of Maryland. Known as Budds Creek Road, the state highway runs 19.02 miles (30.61 km) from U.S. Route 301 (US 301) in Allens Fresh east to MD 5 in Leonardtown. MD 234 is the primary east–west highway of southern Charles County and western St. Mary's County, connecting the St. Mary's County seat of Leonardtown and the communities of Clements, Chaptico, Budds Creek, Wicomico, and Newport with US 301, which heads north to La Plata, the county seat of Charles County, and south to the Governor Harry W. Nice Memorial Bridge over the Potomac River.

MD 234 originally followed what is now MD 238 from Chaptico east to MD 5 at Helen. The Chaptico–Leonardtown portion of the highway was then designated as part of MD 237. The original MD 234 was constructed in the early 1920s; MD 237 was built in the late 1920s and early 1930s. MD 237 between Clements and Leonardtown was reconstructed around 1950. The Chaptico–Clements section of MD 237 and MD 234 west of Chaptico were rebuilt around 1960, projects that involved many relocations and several new bridges. At the conclusion of the project in 1961, MD 234 was extended east over the former section of MD 237 to Leonardtown; MD 238 was extended from Chaptico to Helen on what was previously MD 234.

== Route description ==
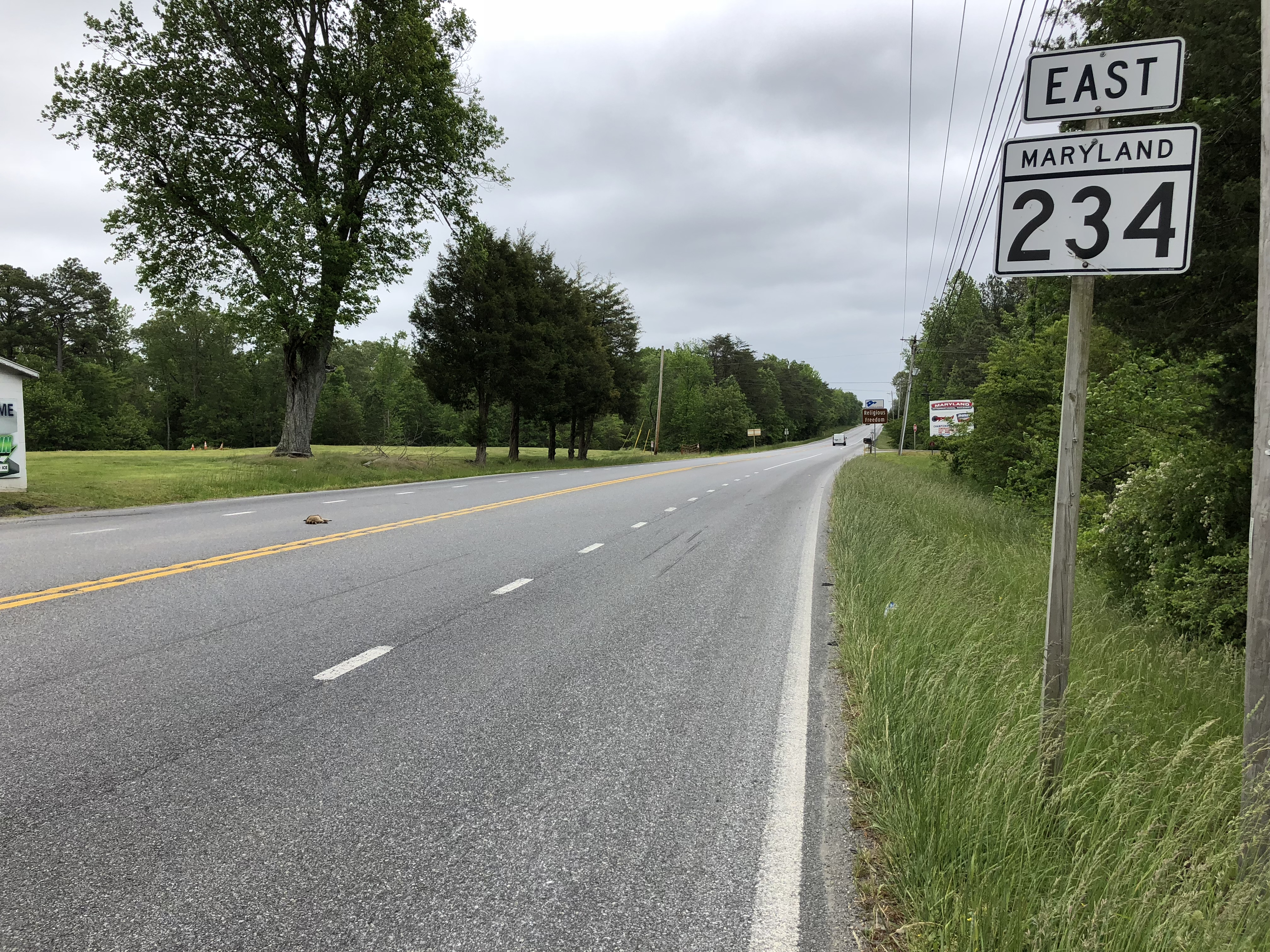
View east along MD 234 at MD 236 near Budds Creek

MD 234 begins at a directional crossover intersection with US 301 (Robert Crain Highway) about 4 miles (6.4 km) north of the Governor Harry W. Nice Memorial Bridge, also known as the Potomac River Bridge. The state highway heads east as a two-lane undivided road that crosses over CSX's Popes Creek Subdivision railroad line and passes through the hamlet of Allens Fresh. MD 234 crosses Allens Fresh Run, a tributary of the Wicomico River, as the stream flows out of the southern end of Zekiah Swamp, which is preserved within Zekiah Swamp Natural Environment Area. The state highway passes through the community of Newport, home of St. Mary's Roman Catholic Church, and crosses Gilbert Swamp Run into the hamlet of Wicomico, which contains the historic home Sarum. MD 234 leaves Charles County by crossing over Budds Creek.

MD 234 curves southeast through the hamlet of Budds Creek, where the highway meets the southern end of MD 236 (Thompson Corner Road) and passes north of three motorsports facilities: Maryland International Raceway, Budds Creek Motocross, and Potomac Speedway. The state highway continues southeast, passing northeast of Wicomico Shores Country Club and its associated residential area separated from the highway by a large tract of forest. MD 234 crosses Hayden Run and passes through Chaptico, where the highway intersects MD 238 at a roundabout; MD 238 heads northeast as Chaptico Road and southwest as Maddox Road. The state highway passes another historic home, Deep Falls, on the way to Clements. At Clements, MD 234 comes to a roundabout with MD 242 (Colton Point Road), which leads south to the site of Maryland's First Landing at St. Clement's Island. A park and ride lot is located at the northwest corner of this roundabout. The state highway crosses Saint Clements Creek and heads east through farmland, crossing Nelson Run right before the highway reaches its eastern terminus at MD 5 (Point Lookout Road) on the western edge of Leonardtown.

== History ==
Maryland Route 237
- Location: Chaptico–Leonardtown
- Existed: 1927–1961

MD 234 originally followed roughly its current course from Allens Fresh to Chaptico, then followed what is now MD 238 east to MD 5 at Helen. The highway between Chaptico and Leonardtown via Clements was MD 237. MD 234 was constructed as a gravel road from Allens Fresh east to Newport around 1921. The highway was extended east to the Charles – St. Mary's county line in 1923. The Chaptico–Helen road, as well as 1 mile (1.6 km) of road west of Chaptico, were also constructed in 1923. The original course of MD 234 was completed when the gap between Chaptico and the county line at Budds Creek was filled in 1925. MD 237 was started between Clements and Leonardtown in 1924 and between Chaptico and Clements in 1926. By 1927, there were two 1-mile (1.6 km) sections of gravel east from Chaptico and east from Clements. Another section of highway west from Clements was built in 1928. By 1930, MD 237 was complete from Clements to Leonardtown. The gap between Chaptico and Clements was under construction in 1930 and completed in 1932.

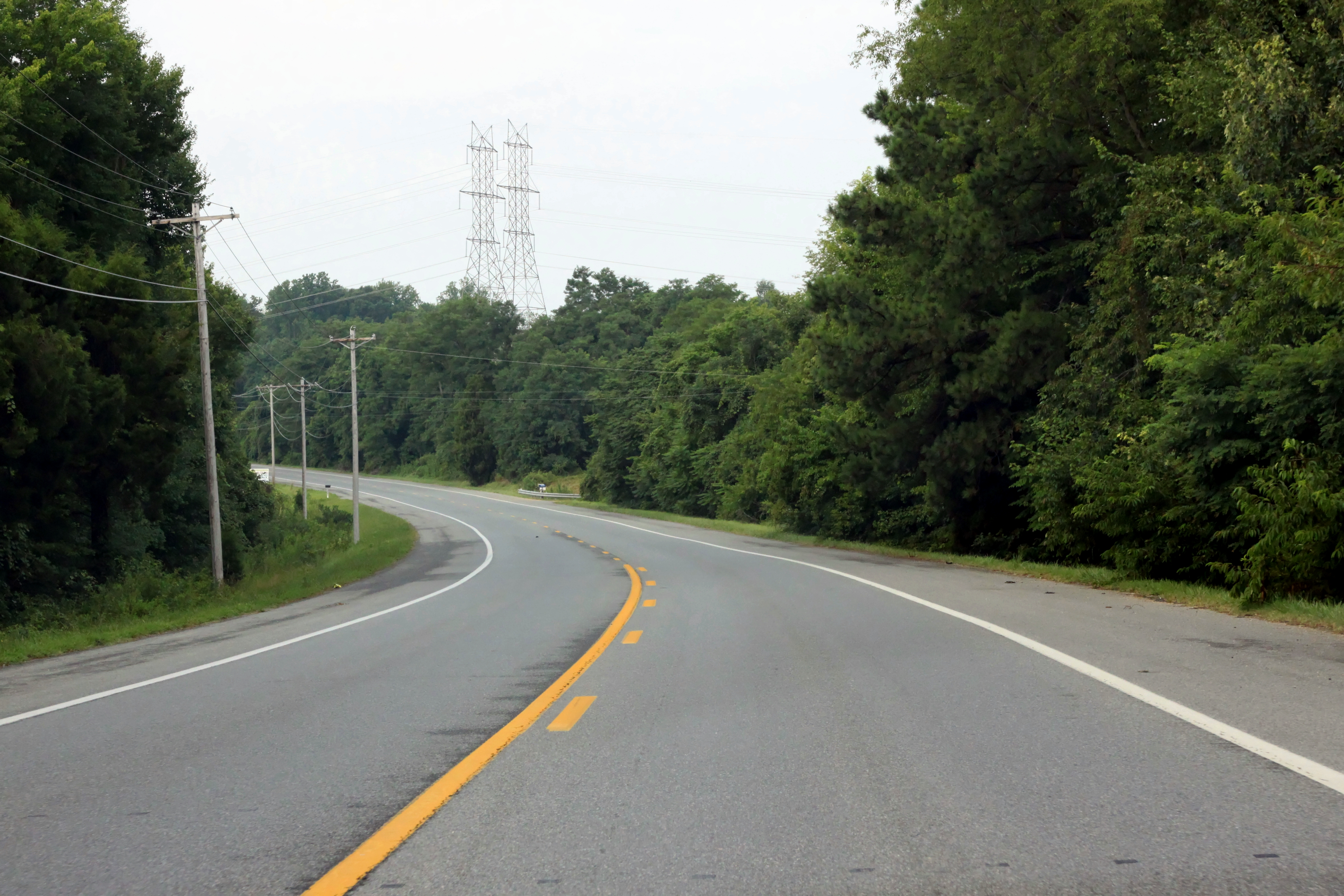
MD 234 westbound approaching US 301 in Allens Fresh

The first upgrade of MD 234 was a relocation at Allens Fresh Run, which included replacing a dangerous one-way bridge over the stream, that was completed in 1933. MD 237 was reconstructed with a bituminous stabilized gravel surface between Clements and Leonardtown in 1950 and 1951, a project that included new bridges over Clements Creek at a spot known as Head-of-the-Bay and over Nelson Run near Leonardtown. Reconstruction of MD 234 from Allens Fresh to Chaptico and MD 237 from there to Clements occurred between 1959 and 1961. MD 234 and MD 237 were significantly straightened out, leaving behind many sections of old alignment: Glasva School Road in Allens Fresh; Allens Fresh Road between Allens Fresh and Newport; Stines Store Road in Newport; Plater Road and Olde Mill Road in Wicomico; Stone Corner Lane, which is unsigned MD 868G, and Reed Road in Budds Creek; and Horse Shoe Road between Chaptico and Clements. The project also involved new bridges over Gilbert Swamp Run, Chaptico Creek, and Budds Creek. When the project was completed in 1961, MD 234 assumed the course of MD 237 between Chaptico and Leonardtown and MD 238 was extended over the segment of MD 234 between Chaptico and Helen.

The first roundabout in St. Mary's County was installed at the intersection of MD 238 and MD 234 in Chaptico in 2007. In September 2011, MD 234's bridge over Allens Fresh Run was washed out by flooding of the creek due to torrential rainfall from the remnants of Tropical Storm Lee. Traffic was detoured over MD 236, MD 6, and US 301 until a temporary bridge was completed parallel to the damaged section in November 2011. The Maryland State Highway Administration dismantled the damaged 40-foot-long (12 m) bridge and built a 100-foot-long (30 m) replacement bridge in 2012.

== Junction list ==
County	Location	mi	km	Destinations	Notes
Charles	Allens Fresh	0.00	0.00	US 301 (Robert Crain Highway) – La Plata, Potomac River Bridge	Western terminus
St. Mary's	Budds Creek	7.24	11.65	MD 236 north (Thompson Corner Road) – Charlotte Hall	Southern terminus of MD 236
St. Mary's	Chaptico	11.28	18.15	MD 238 (Maddox Road/Chaptico Road) – Maddox, Helen	Roundabout
St. Mary's	Clements	15.52	24.98	MD 242 (Colton Point Road) – Coltons Point, Morganza	Roundabout
St. Mary's	Leonardtown	19.02	30.61	MD 5 (Point Lookout Road) – Point Lookout, Waldorf	Eastern terminus
1.000 mi = 1.609 km; 1.000 km = 0.621 mi
