= Maryland Route 238 =

State highway in Maryland, United States

Maryland Route 238
- Maryland Route 238 highlighted in red

Route information
- Maintained by MDSHA
- Length: 10.83 mi (17.43 km)
- Existed: 1927–present
- Tourist routes: Religious Freedom Byway

Major junctions
- South end: MD 242 near Bushwood
- MD 234 at Chaptico
- North end: MD 5 at Helen

Location
- Country: United States
- State: Maryland
- Counties: St. Mary's

Highway system
- Maryland highway system; Interstate; US; State; Scenic Byways
← MD 237	→ MD 239

Maryland Route 238 (MD 238) is a state highway in the U.S. state of Maryland. The state highway runs 10.83 miles (17.43 km) from MD 242 near Bushwood north to MD 5 at Helen. MD 238 is a C-shaped highway in western St. Mary's County, connecting Bushwood and Helen with Maddox and Chaptico, where the highway intersects MD 234. What is now MD 238 was originally parts of two different highways: Maddox Road was MD 238 from Bushwood to Chaptico while Chaptico Road was the easternmost part of MD 234 from Chaptico to Helen. The highways were constructed as gravel roads in the late 1920s and early 1920s, respectively. MD 238 was extended from Chaptico to Helen when MD 234 was moved to its present course toward Leonardtown in the early 1960s.

== Route description ==
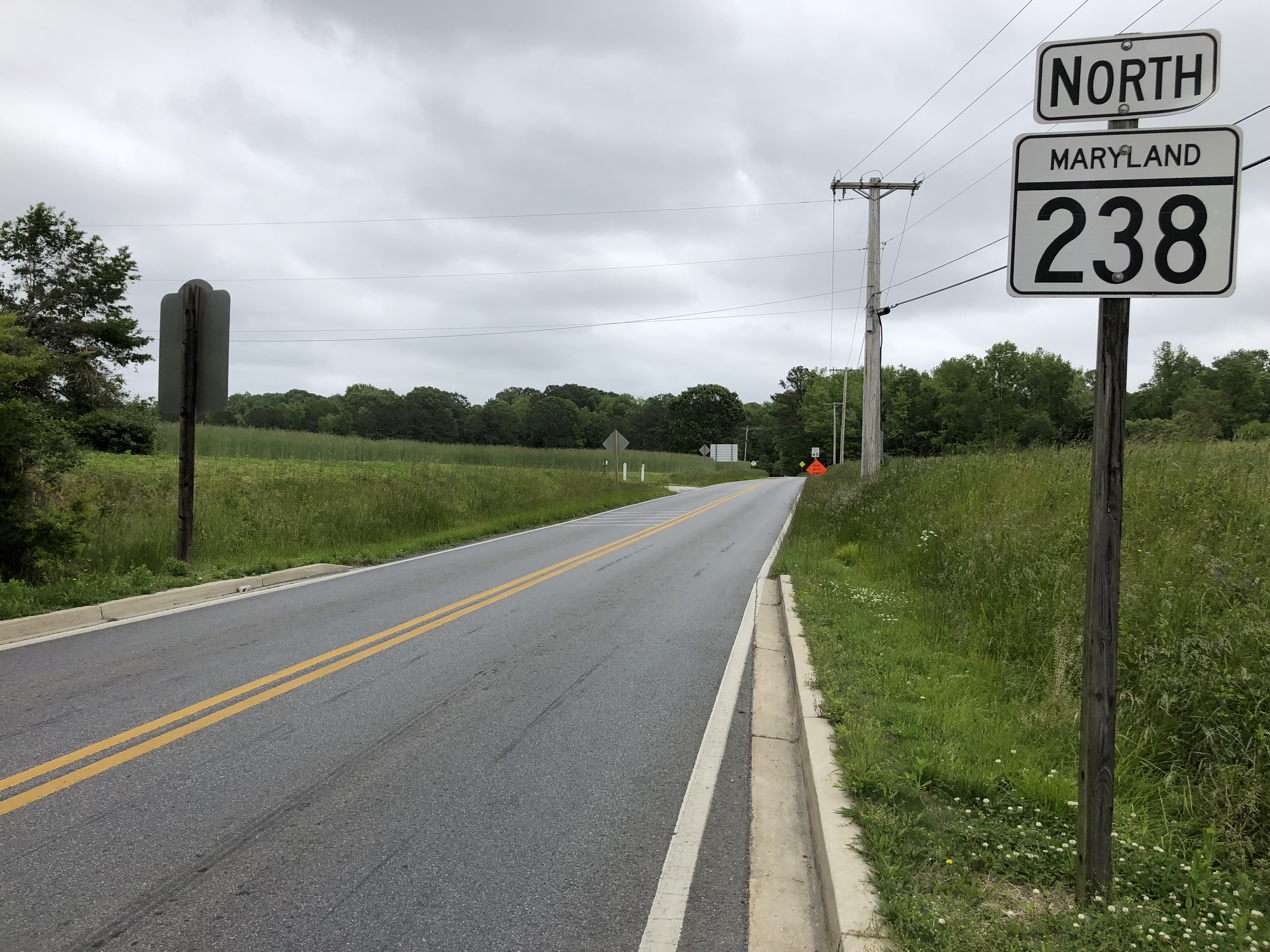
View north along MD 238 at MD 234 in Chaptico

MD 238 begins at an intersection with MD 242 (Colton Point Road) near Bushwood. The state highway heads northwest as two-lane undivided Maddox Road through a mix of farmland and forest, passing by the hamlet of Bushwood, where the highway intersects Bushwood Road. MD 238 passes to the west of Longview Beach, a community on the Wicomico River, as the highway begins to curve to the north. The state highway continues north through the village of Maddox, where the highway intersects Mill Point Road and Manor Road. Mill Point Road heads west to the Mill Point Shores community at the confluence of Chaptico Bay with the Wicomico River. Manor Road heads east across Bull Run toward the historic home Bachelor's Hope. MD 238 veers to the northeast, begins to parallel the edge of the wetlands along Chaptico Run, and crosses Burroughs Run and Nelsons Run. The state highway reaches the community of Chaptico, where the highway passes west of Christ Episcopal Church before meeting MD 234 (Budds Creek Road) at a roundabout. MD 238 continues east as Chaptico Road toward the community of Helen. The state highway intersects the unnamed old alignment of MD 5, which is unsigned MD 5B, at a perpendicular intersection before reaching its northern terminus tangent to a curve of MD 5 (Point Lookout Road).

== History ==
The present course of MD 238 was constructed as two highways: MD 234 from Chaptico to Helen and MD 238 from Bushwood to Chaptico. MD 234, which originally had its eastern terminus at Helen, was constructed as a gravel road from Chaptico to Helen around 1923. MD 238 was built as a gravel road from Chaptico to Maddox in 1925 and 1926. The Maddox–Bushwood portion of MD 238 was completed in 1930. MD 234's eastern terminus was originally a T-intersection where traffic on MD 5 had to make a right turn to continue on that highway. MD 234 was extended a short distance east when MD 5's present curve at Helen was constructed around 1934. In 1961, MD 234's eastern terminus was moved from MD 5 at Helen to MD 5 near Leonardtown, assuming the original MD 237 in the process. MD 238 was then extended east along Chaptico Road to Helen. The roundabout at the intersection of MD 238 and MD 234 in Chaptico, the first roundabout in St. Mary's County, was constructed in 2007.

== Junction list ==
The entire route is in St. Mary's County.

Location	mi	km	Destinations	Notes
Bushwood	0.00	0.00	MD 242 (Colton Point Road) – Coltons Point, Clements	Southern terminus
Chaptico	7.17	11.54	MD 234 to US 301 – Leonardtown, Potomac River Bridge	Roundabout
Helen	10.83	17.43	MD 5 (Point Lookout Road) – Leonardtown, Waldorf	Northern terminus
1.000 mi = 1.609 km; 1.000 km = 0.621 mi
