= Maryland Route 470 =

State highway in Maryland, United States

Maryland Route 470
- Oakley Road
- Maryland Route 470 highlighted in red

Route information
- Maintained by MDSHA
- Length: 3.75 mi (6.04 km)
- Existed: 1933–present

Major junctions
- South end: MD 242 in Avenue
- North end: MD 242 in Dynard

Location
- Country: United States
- State: Maryland
- Counties: St. Mary's

Highway system
- Maryland highway system; Interstate; US; State; Scenic Byways
← MD 468	→ MD 471

Maryland Route 470 (MD 470) is a state highway in the U.S. state of Maryland. Known as Oakley Road, the state highway runs north 3.75 miles (6.04 km) between intersections with MD 242 in Avenue and Dynard. MD 470 loops through Oakley in western St. Mary's County. The state highway was constructed in the early 1930s.

== Route description ==
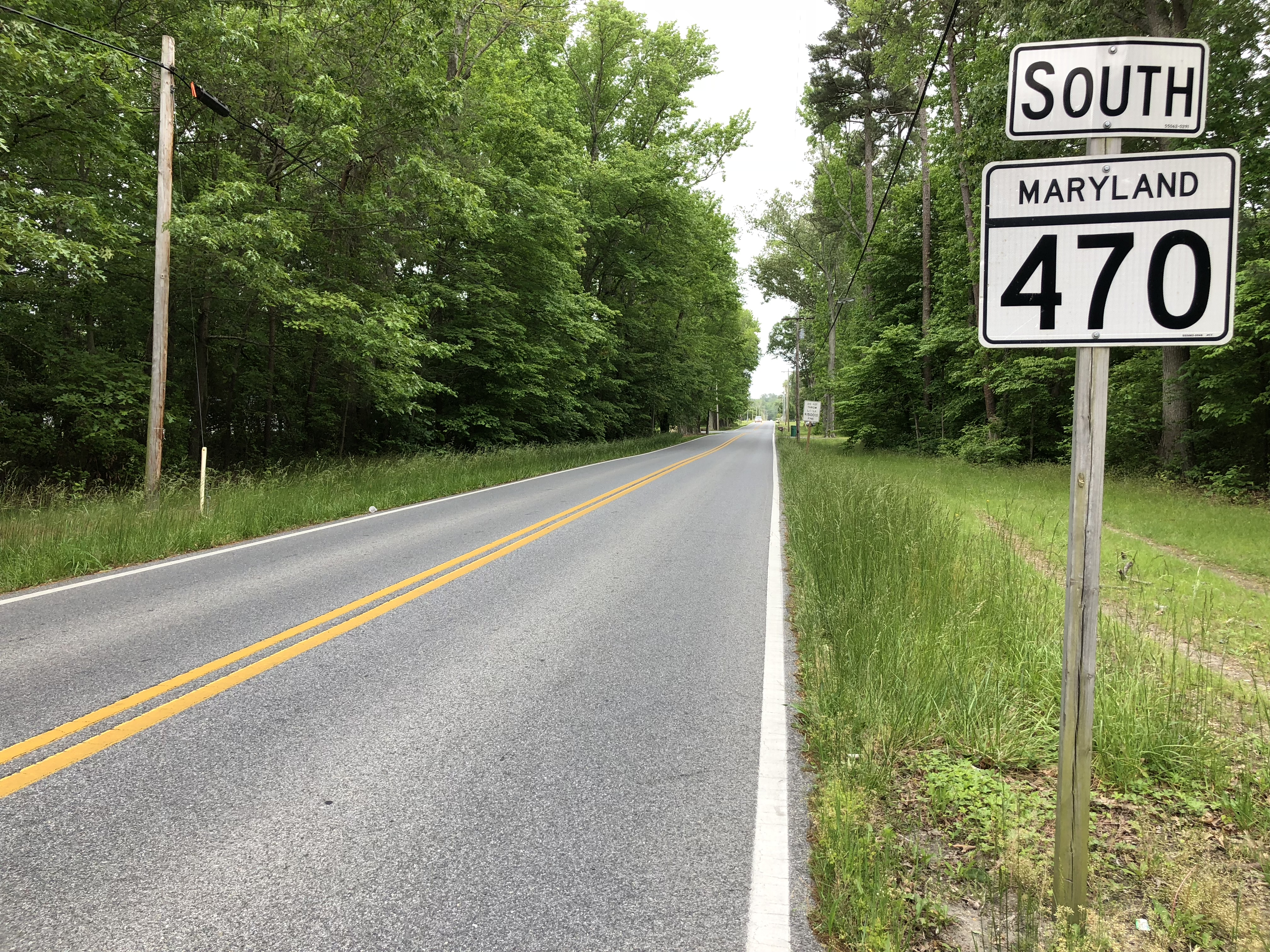
View south from the north end of MD 470 at MD 242 in Dynard

MD 470 begins at an intersection with MD 242 (Colton Point Road) in the community of Avenue. The state highway immediately intersects Abell Road, which heads east toward the community of Abell. MD 470 heads northeast as an 18-foot (5.5 m) wide two-lane undivided road through a mix of farmland and forest. The state highway crosses Canoe Neck Creek before curving north through the hamlet of Oakley. The highway intersects Burch Road, which provides access to the historic home The River View, before widening to 20 feet (6.1 m). MD 470 passes west of All Saints Episcopal Church, then crosses Tomakokin Creek and reaches its northern terminus at MD 242 (Colton Point Road) near the hamlet of Dynard.

== History ==
MD 470 was constructed as a gravel road in three sections in the early 1930s. The first section was constructed from Avenue to just north of Canoe Neck Creek starting in 1930. That first section and the second section from Canoe Neck Creek through Oakley to south of Tomakokin Creek were completed by 1933. The final section north to Dynard was started in 1934 and completed in 1935. Aside from widening and paving, MD 470 has changed very little from when it was first constructed.

== Junction list ==
The entire route is in St. Mary's County.

Location	mi	km	Destinations	Notes
Avenue	0.00	0.00	MD 242 (Colton Point Road) – Coltons Point, Bushwood	Southern terminus
Dynard	3.75	6.04	MD 242 (Colton Point Road) – Clements	Northern terminus
1.000 mi = 1.609 km; 1.000 km = 0.621 mi
