= Maryland Route 5 =

Highway in Maryland, United States

Maryland Route 5

Route information
- Maintained by MDSHA
- Length: 74.34 mi (119.64 km)
- Existed: 1927–present
- Tourist routes: Religious Freedom Byway; Booth's Escape Scenic Byway

Major junctions
- South end: Point Lookout Road in Point Lookout
- MD 235 in Ridge; MD 4 in Leonardtown; MD 235 in Oraville; MD 6 in Charlotte Hall; MD 231 in Hughesville; US 301 in Waldorf; MD 373 in Brandywine; MD 337 in Camp Springs; I-95 / I-495 in Camp Springs; MD 414 in Marlow Heights
- North end: Branch Avenue SE at Washington, D.C. border in Suitland

Location
- Country: United States
- State: Maryland
- Counties: St. Mary's, Charles, Prince George's

Highway system
- Maryland highway system; Interstate; US; State; Scenic Byways
← MD 4	→ MD 6
← MD 624	MD 625	→ MD 627

Maryland Route 5 (MD 5) is a 74.34-mile (119.64 km) long state highway that runs north–south in the U.S. state of Maryland. The highway runs from Point Lookout in St. Mary's County north to the Washington, D.C. border in Suitland, Prince George's County. MD 5 begins as two-lane undivided Point Lookout Road which runs from Point Lookout to an intersection with MD 235 in the northern part of St. Mary's County. Point Lookout Road passes through rural areas as well as the county seat of Leonardtown. After the MD 235 intersection, the route becomes four-lane divided Three Notch Road and continues into Charles County, where it becomes Leonardtown Road. Here, the route bypasses Hughesville and continues north toward the Waldorf area, which it bypasses to the east on Mattawoman Beantown Road. The route merges onto U.S. Route 301 (US 301, Crain Highway) and enters Prince George's County, splitting from US 301 at an interchange in Brandywine. From here, MD 5 continues north on Branch Avenue, running through suburban areas, before becoming a freeway as it passes Andrews Air Force Base and has an interchange with Interstate 95 (I-95)/I-495 (Capital Beltway). Past the Capital Beltway, the route runs through suburban areas of Hillcrest Heights and Suitland before reaching the Washington, D.C. border, where Branch Avenue SE continues, crossing Pennsylvania Avenue SE and eventually terminating at Randle Circle.

MD 5 was designated in 1927 to run from Point Lookout to the Washington, D.C. border in Suitland. The route was realigned to follow Naylor Road to the Washington, D.C. line in 1939, while MD 637 was designated along the portion of Branch Avenue leading to the border. Between 1939 and 1949, the route continued into Washington, D.C. as District of Columbia Route 5 (DC 5), which followed Naylor Road SE, Good Hope Road SE, 11th Street SE, and DC 4 (Pennsylvania Avenue) to US 1 and US 240 near the White House. MD 5 was realigned to head to the Washington, D.C. border along Branch Avenue in 1950. During the course of the 1950s and 1960s, most of MD 5 between the MD 235 intersection and the Washington, D.C. border was widened into a divided highway. In 1993, the route bypassed Leonardtown; the original alignment was designated MD 5 Business (MD 5 Bus.) before it was decommissioned in 2012. In 1997, MD 5 was realigned to bypass Waldorf to the east along what had been designated as MD 205 in 1989. The former alignment through Waldorf followed what is now MD 5 Bus. and US 301. In Prince George's County, multiple interchanges were built along MD 5 between MD 223 and the Capital Beltway in the 1990s and early 2000s. In 2007, a four-lane, divided bypass of Hughesville was completed, alleviating the traffic bottleneck within that town at the intersection of MD 231. The former alignment through Hughesville became MD 5 Bus. The portion of MD 5 between US 301 and the Capital Beltway is slated to be upgraded to a full freeway, with an interchange at MD 373 (Accokeek Road)/Brandywine Road completed and the remainder of the freeway upgrade still in the planning stages.

== Route description ==
=== St. Mary's County ===
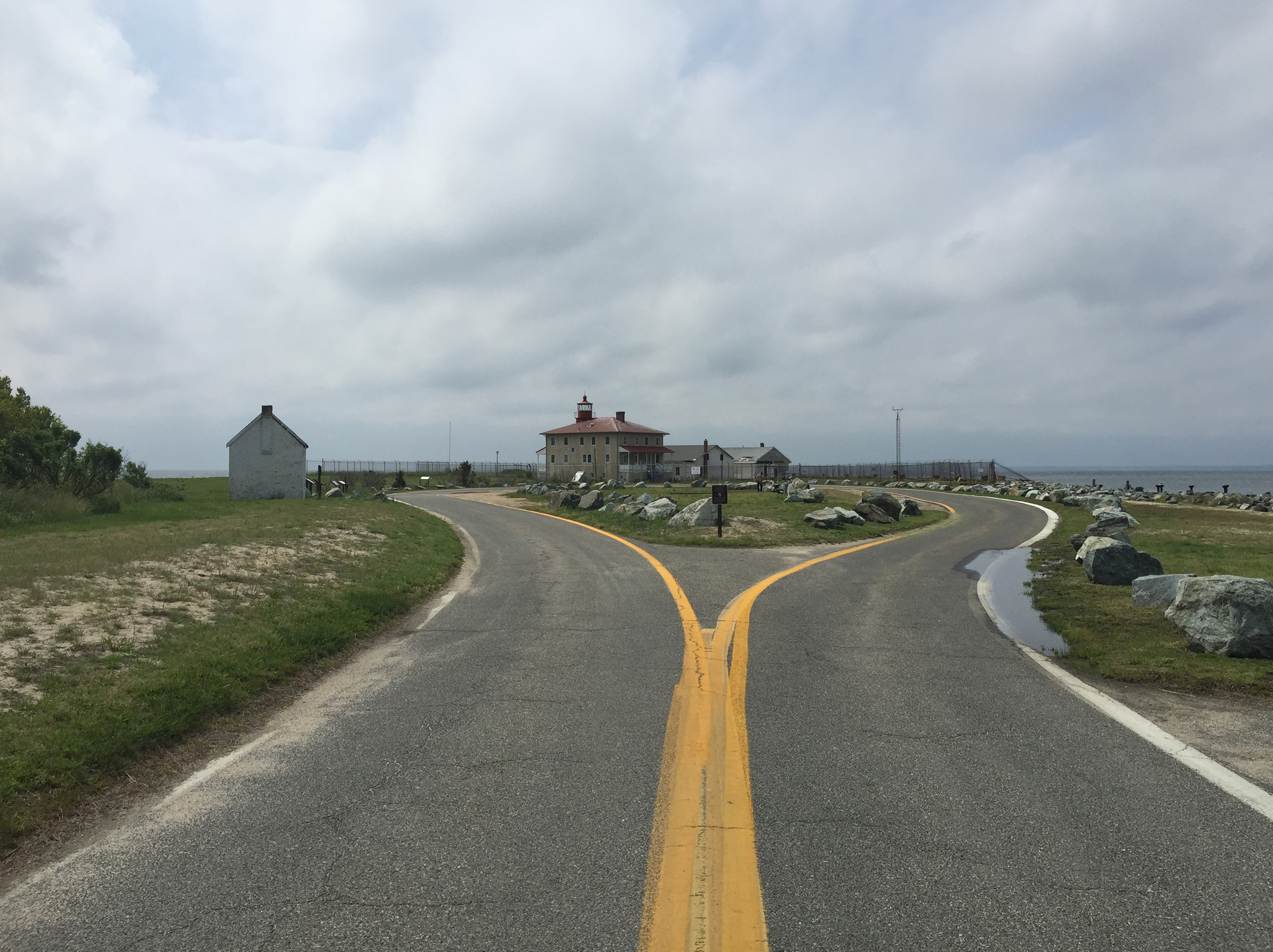
Southern terminus of MD 5 at Point Lookout State Park

MD 5 begins within Point Lookout State Park in St. Mary's County by heading west on Point Lookout Road, a two-lane undivided road which continues south from the route’s southern terminus along the shoreline of the Chesapeake Bay to the confluence with the Potomac River. The route turns north, passing a fee booth for the park at the entrance before continuing into wooded areas. A short distance later, the road makes a left turn and heads northwest through a mix of woodland and farmland. MD 5 passes through Scotland and continues north through more agricultural areas with intermittent residences. It reaches Ridge, where MD 5 intersects the southern terminus of MD 235 (Three Notch Road). From here, the road heads into more wooded areas. MD 5 passes through agricultural and residential areas before turning northwest and entering St. Mary's City. Here, the route makes a turn to the north, with MD 584 looping to the west of the route through the center of St. Mary's City. The road runs along the shore of the St. Marys River and passes near St. Mary's College of Maryland before leaving St. Mary's City had heading into forested areas. It reaches Park Hall, where MD 5 intersects MD 489 (Park Hall Road).

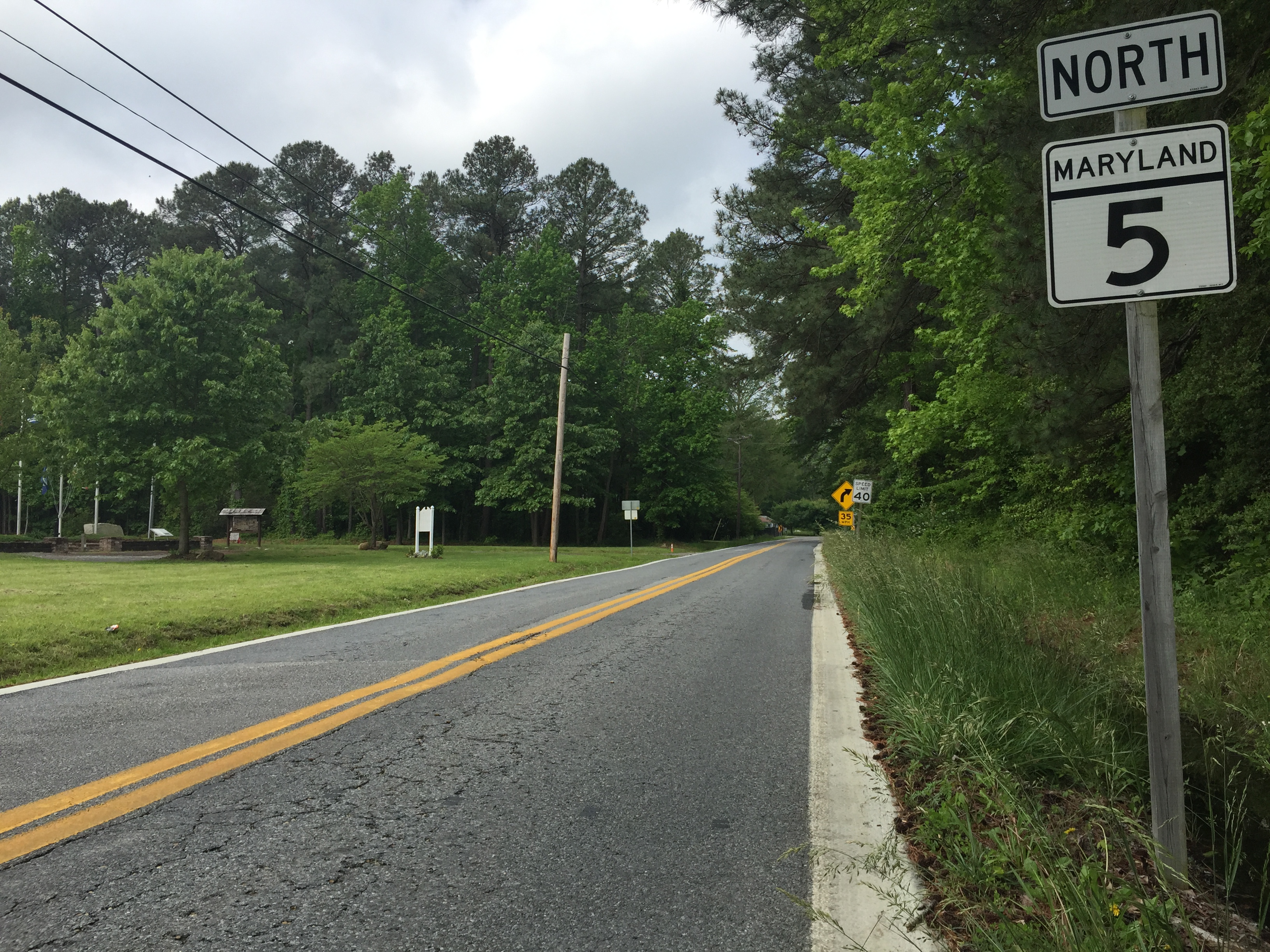
View north along MD 5 in Scotland in southern St. Mary's County

Past MD 489, the route turns to the west and heads through a mix of woods, farms, and homes. It heads to Great Mills, where it briefly becomes a divided highway at the intersection with MD 246 (Great Mills Road). From here, MD 5 continues west to an intersection with MD 471 (Indian Bridge Road). Past this intersection, MD 5 continues to Callaway. Here, the route intersects MD 249 (Piney Point Road). It passes some businesses before heading into wooded areas with residences. The route turns north, passing through Redgate, before heading toward Leonardtown.

Upon reaching Leonardtown, MD 5 passes between Leonardtown High School and the Dr. James A. Forrest Career and Technology Center to the west and the St. Mary's County Fairgrounds to the east before it intersects MD 244 (Medleys Neck Road). Following this, the road reaches a junction with MD 4 (St. Andrews Church Road). Past this intersection, the route becomes a divided highway again, entering Leonardtown, where it heads northeast of St. Mary's Ryken High School and Fenwick Street heads west toward the downtown area. MD 5 heads northwest through woodland before passing by the Leonardtown campus of the College of Southern Maryland. Past the college, the road intersects MD 245 (Hollywood Road) and Washington Street. The road widens to four lanes and heads through a mix of residences and businesses, passing near MedStar St. Mary's Hospital. It leaves Leonardtown and becomes a divided highway at the intersection with MD 243 (Newtowne Neck Road). MD 5 passes commercial areas before heading into farmland at the intersection with MD 234 (Budds Creek Road).

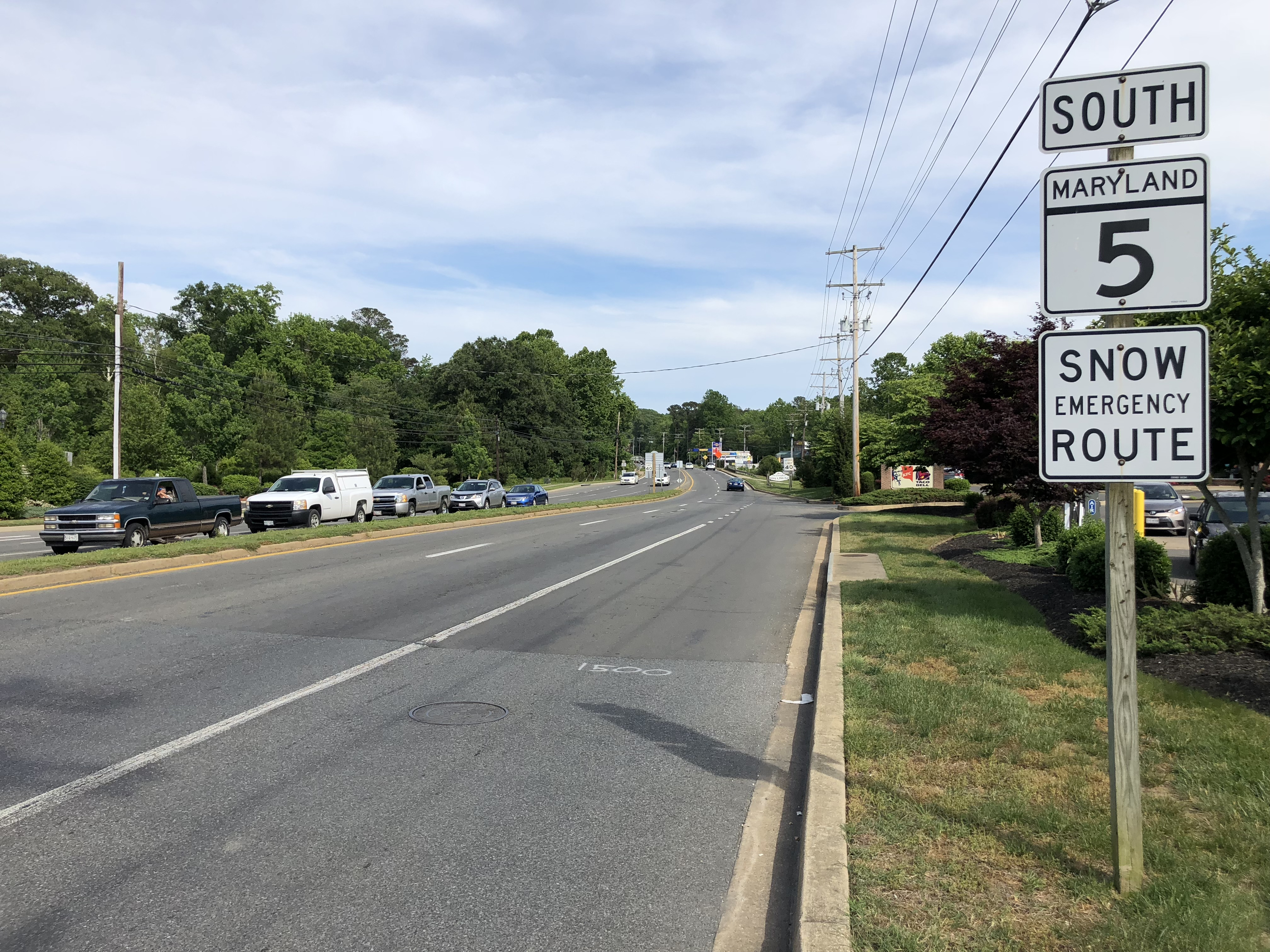
MD 5 southbound at MD 243 in Leonardtown

From here, the route becomes a two-lane undivided road again. It heads north through a mix of farm fields and residences, eventually coming to an intersection with MD 247 (Loveville Road) in Loveville. The Loveville area is home to several farms belonging to an Old Order Mennonite community. MD 5 turns northwest, heading through woodland and reaching Morganza, where the route intersects MD 242 (Colton Point Road). The road heads west through a mix of woods and farms to Helen, where MD 5 reaches an intersection with MD 238 (Chaptico Road). Here, the route turns north, with residential neighborhoods increasing along the road as it continues through rural areas. The route passes east of a park and ride lot before it comes to another intersection with MD 235 (Three Notch Road) in Oraville, where MD 5 makes a left turn onto Three Notch Road, a four-lane divided highway. The route heads northwest through a mix of rural residences and businesses, with the median widening briefly to include some businesses when the route reaches Mechanicsville. The road continues through rural commercial areas before reaching Charlotte Hall. Here, the median widens again and MD 5 intersects MD 236 (Thompson Corner Road) and MD 6 (New Market Turner Road). From here, the median narrows again as the route turns to the north and continues through a mix of farms and woods with some businesses, passing to the east of the St. Mary's County Welcome Center. Farther north, MD 863 loops off to the east of MD 5 and serves a farmers market. The area around Mechanicsville and Charlotte Hall is home to several Amish farms and businesses.

=== Charles County ===
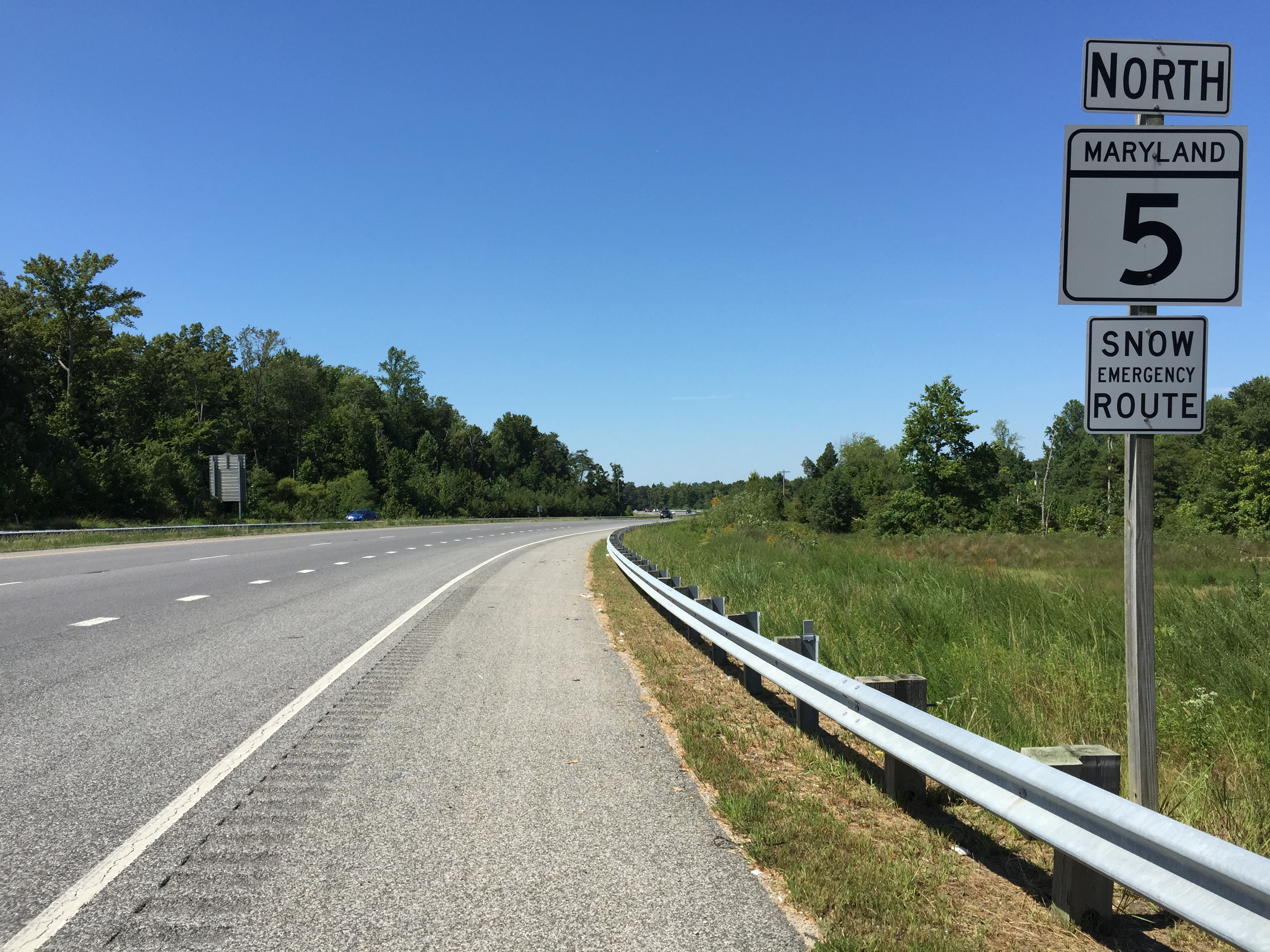
MD 5 northbound past MD 231 in Hughesville

MD 5 crosses into Charles County, where it continues north on Leonardtown Road through areas of rural residences. The route reaches Hughesville, where MD 5 bypasses the community to the east on a limited-access highway and MD 5 Bus. (MD 625) continues to the north through Hughesville on Old Leonardtown Road. The bypass heads through wooded areas before coming to a dumbbell interchange with MD 231 (Prince Frederick Road) that features roundabouts where the ramps meet MD 231. Past MD 231, the bypass continues through woodland before intersecting MD 5 Business again. From here, MD 5 heads northwest through a mix of woods and farms with some residences and businesses. The route turns to the west and passes through Bryantown, where it intersects Olivers Shop Road/Bryantown Road intersection.

The road turns to the northwest past Bryantown and heads through wooded areas, passing through Zekiah Swamp. MD 5 comes to an intersection with MD 488 (La Plata Road) and turns north again, heading through a mix of woods, farms, and residences. The route heads through wooded residential neighborhoods before it heads back into farmland. The route reaches the eastern edge of the planned community of St. Charles, where it comes to an intersection where St. Charles Parkway heads south into St. Charles, MD 5 Business heads to the west on Leonardtown Road, and MD 5 turns north onto Mattawoman Beantown Road.

MD 5 follows Mattawoman Beantown Road, a four-lane divided highway that bypasses the center of Waldorf to the east. The route intersects Poplar Hill Road, which leads to the house of Dr. Samuel A. Mudd. Mattawoman Beantown Road carries MD 5 north through farm fields before heading into woodland, passing west of a park and ride lot serving MTA Maryland commuter buses. It continues into suburban residential areas of Waldorf, passing by the entrance to the Pinefield neighborhood, which used to be intertwined with several Nike Missile installations. The route crosses CSX's Popes Creek Subdivision railroad line at-grade before coming to an intersection with US 301 (Crain Highway). This intersection has no direct access from northbound MD 5 to southbound US 301, with access provided by Mattawoman Drive. Here, MD 5 forms a concurrency with US 301 and continues north as a six-lane divided highway.

=== Prince George's County ===
The Crain Highway crosses the Mattawoman Creek into Prince George's County, where it heads north through wooded areas with some businesses along the road. US 301 splits from MD 5 at an interchange near Brandywine with MD 5 continuing to the north on four-lane divided Branch Avenue. A short distance past US 301, the route comes to an interchange that connects to Brandywine Road and MD 373 (Accokeek Road), where it briefly widens to six lanes. It continues north as a four-lane divided highway through woodland with some businesses and adjacent residential areas before passing by the MedStar Southern Maryland Hospital Center at the Surratts Road intersection. Past Surratts Road, the route heads through suburban residential areas of Clinton as a six-lane road before turning into a freeway that comes to a single-point urban interchange (SPUI) with MD 223 (Woodyard Road).

The route heads northwest through commercial areas, with interchanges located at Malcolm Road (MD 5M)/Schultz Road and Coventry Way (MD 5L), the latter being a single-point urban interchange. The route has a southbound exit to Old Branch Avenue and a northbound entrance from Old Alexandria Ferry Road before it turns north and heads through wooded surroundings, forming the western boundary of Andrews Air Force Base. MD 5 comes to another SPUI with MD 337 (Allentown Road) in Camp Springs. A short distance later, the road interchanges with Manchester Drive (MD 5R)/Linda Lane (MD 5Q) before heading north as a freeway to an interchange with I-95/I-495 (Capital Beltway).

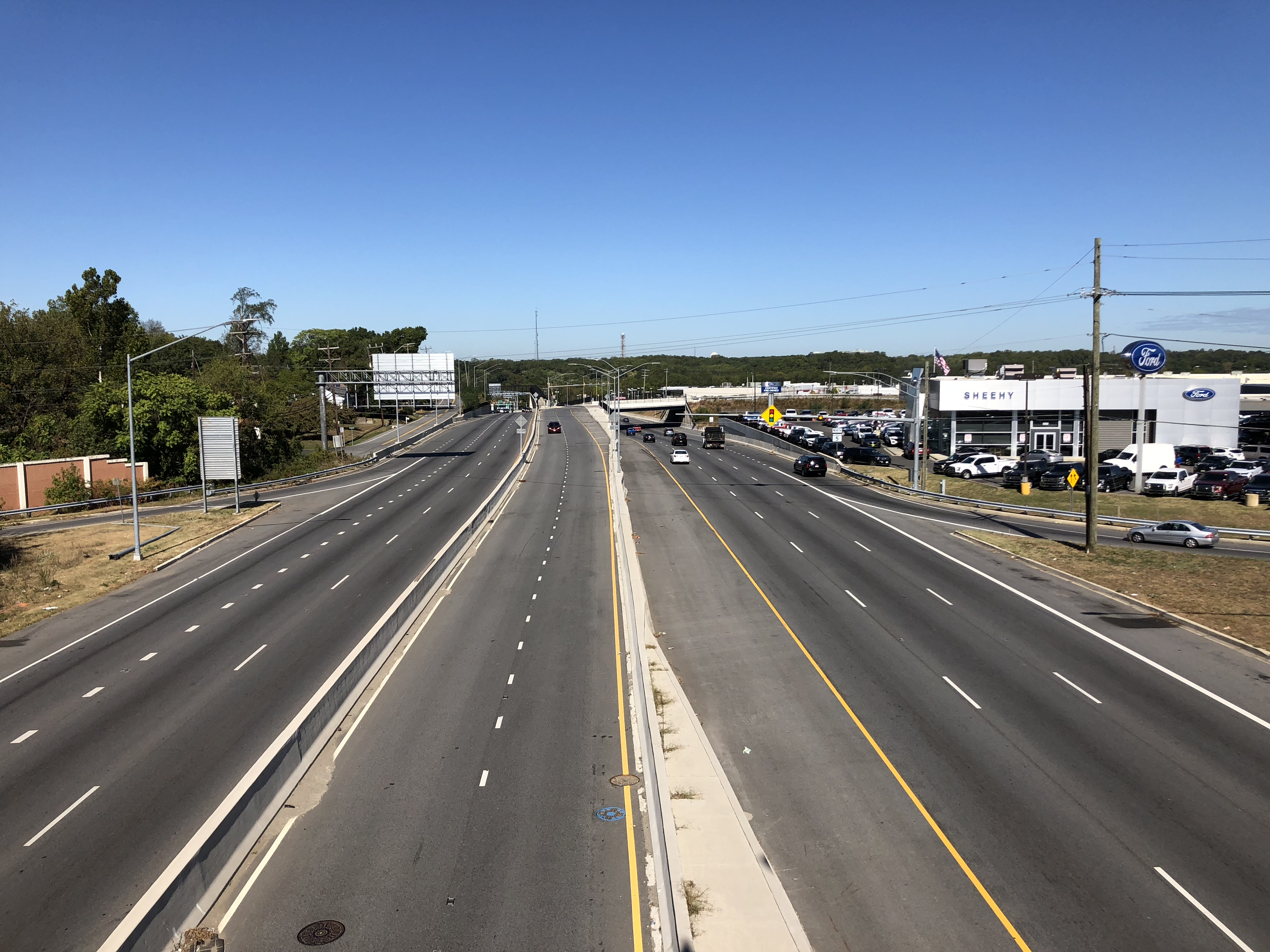
MD 5 northbound past the I-95/I-495 interchange in Camp Springs

Past the Capital Beltway, MD 5 meets MD 535A (Auth Road) at a northbound right-in/right-out intersection; MD 535A provides access to northbound MD 5 from southbound I-95/I-495 as well as from northbound MD 5 to the Branch Avenue station at the terminus of Washington Metro's Green Line. The route continues northwest into commercial areas, coming to a southbound left exit and left entrance with Woods Way that serves Branch Avenue station before it becomes a surface road again and intersects MD 967C (Simpson Road)/Auth Way and MD 967A (Old Branch Avenue). The route narrows to four lanes and turns west, coming to an interchange with MD 414 (St. Barnabas Road) in Marlow Heights. MD 5 turns to the northwest past this interchange, passing by the Marlow Heights Shopping Center and continuing to Hillcrest Heights, where the route intersects MD 458 (Silver Hill Road) adjacent to The Shops at Iverson.

The route passes more businesses and heads toward Suitland, where it intersects MD 414 (Bonita Street) again. The road continues north to an intersection with MD 637 (Naylor Road). North of Naylor Road, the route passes under the Green Line of the Washington Metro east of the Naylor Road station, has an interchange with the Suitland Parkway, and narrows to a 2-lane undivided road in quick succession. MD 5 passes through wooded areas before coming to an intersection with Southern Avenue SE at the Washington, D.C. border, where the route ends and Branch Avenue SE continues into the District of Columbia toward Pennsylvania Avenue SE.

== History ==
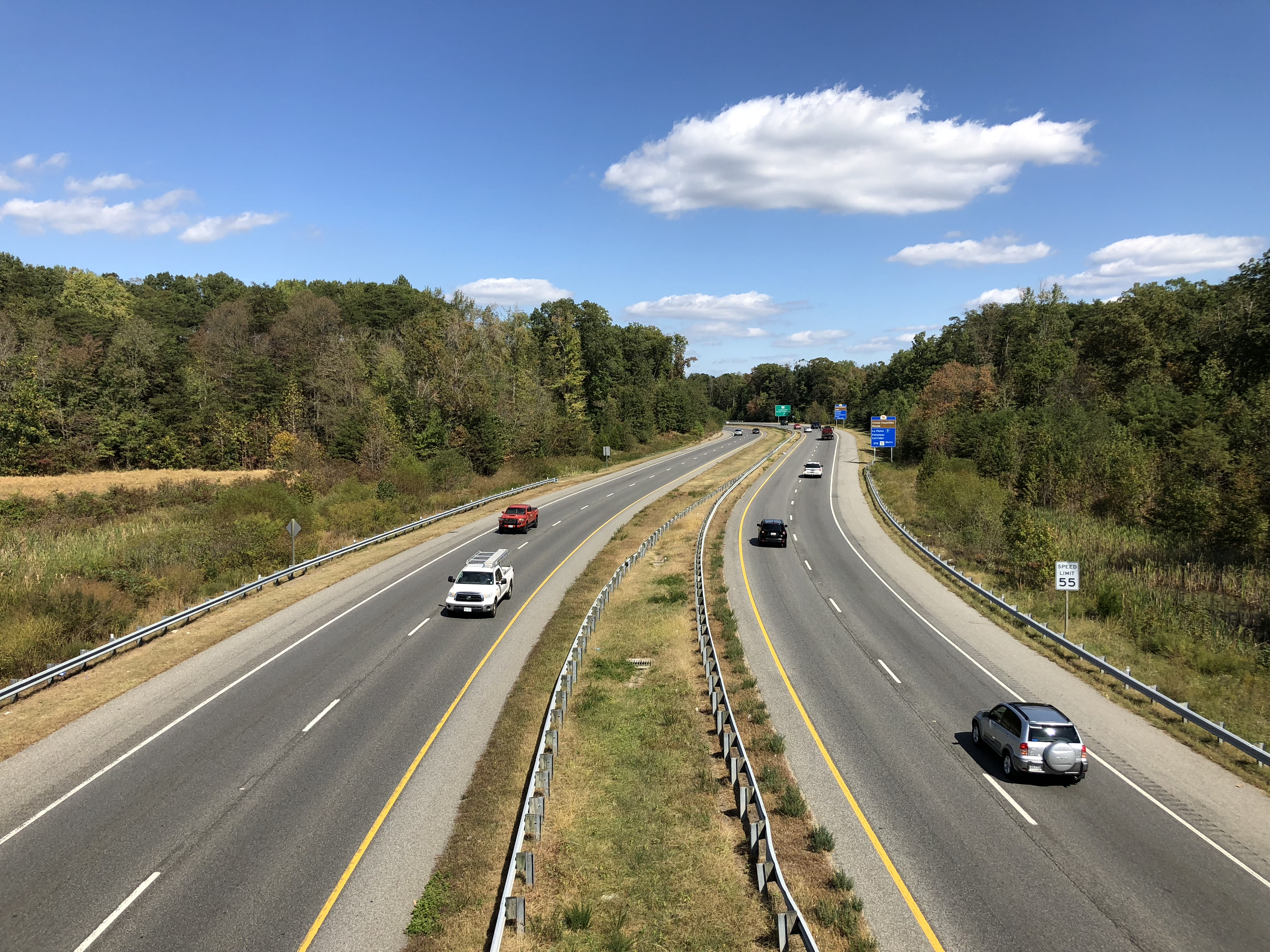
MD 5 northbound along the Hughesville Bypass

In 1911, the road between Leonardtown and Mechanicsville and from south of Camp Springs to the Washington, D.C. border was completed as a state highway while the sections between south of Beantown and the border between Charles and Prince George's counties and between TB and Camp Springs were under contract. At this time, the road between Point Lookout and Leonardtown, Mechanicsville and Beantown, and the Charles-Prince George's county border and TB were proposed as state highways. By 1915, the entire length of the state highway between north of Point Lookout and the Washington, D.C. border was completed. This state highway was paved to the northwest of Leonardtown, between north of Morganza and Hughesville, between the Charles-Prince George's county border and north of TB, and from south of Camp Springs to the Washington, D.C. border while the remainder was an unpaved state road.

MD 5 was designated in 1927 to the state highway between north of Point Lookout and the Washington, D.C. border, passing through Leonardtown, Hughesville, and Waldorf. MD 5 ran concurrent with MD 3 (now US 301) between Waldorf and TB. In 1928, the route was paved between north of TB and Camp Springs. By 1933, MD 5 was paved between northwest of Leonardtown and north of Morganza and along the MD 3 concurrency between Waldorf and the Charles-Prince George's county border. Also, the route was extended south along an unpaved road into Point Lookout State Park. In 1939, MD 5 was rerouted to follow Naylor Road to the Washington, D.C. border while the portion of Branch Avenue leading to the border was designated as MD 637. DC 5 continued into Washington, D.C. along Naylor Road SE, Good Hope Road SE, and 11th Street SE to DC 4 (Pennsylvania Avenue SE). By this time, the section of route between Hughesville and Waldorf was paved while the section between Point Lookout and Leonardtown was a bituminous road. By 1946, MD 5 was paved between Great Mills and Leonardtown. Also, DC 5 was extended to follow DC 4 along Pennsylvania Avenue to US 1 and US 240 at the east side of the White House. In 1949, the DC 5 designation was decommissioned.

In 1950, MD 5 was rerouted to follow Branch Avenue to the Washington, D.C. border, replacing MD 637; MD 637 was designated onto Naylor Road between MD 5 and the Washington, D.C. border by 1966. In addition, the route was widened into a divided highway along the US 301 concurrency between the Charles-Prince George's county border and TB and along Branch Avenue between south of the Henson Creek and the Washington, D.C. border. MD 5 was upgraded from a bituminous to a paved road between St. Mary's City and Great Mills in 1953. The same year, the portion of route along the US 301 concurrency between Waldorf and the Charles-Prince George's county border was widened into a divided highway. MD 5 was relocated to a new alignment to the east between TB and north of Camp Springs in 1956, with a northward extension of MD 381 designated onto the former alignment. This section of MD 381, called Brandywine Road and Old Branch Avenue, was transferred to county maintenance in 1965. In 1959, MD 5 was paved between south of St. Inigoes and St. Mary's City. A year later, the remainder of the route south to Point Lookout was paved. In 1962, MD 5 was widened into a divided highway between south of Newmarket and the St. Mary's-Charles county border and between MD 223 in Clinton and Camp Springs. An interchange was built at the northern terminus of the US 301 concurrency in 1963. The route was upgraded to a divided highway in the Beantown area in 1964. In 1965, MD 5 was improved to a divided highway between MD 235 and south of Newmarket. The divided highway was extended south from Beantown to the MD 488 intersection in 1966. In 1967, the route was widened into a divided highway between the St. Mary's-Charles county border and MD 488 with the exception of the portion through Hughesville. MD 5 was upgraded to a divided highway between US 301 and MD 223 in 1969. An interchange was constructed at MD 414 in 1970.

MD 5 was routed to bypass Leonardtown by 1993, with the former route becoming MD 5 Bus. During the 1990s and early 2000s, multiple interchanges were constructed along MD 5 in Prince George's County. In 1992, an interchange was built at MD 223. The interchange with MD 337 was built in 1996. In 1999, an interchange was constructed at Coventry Way. In 2001, an interchange was constructed with Manchester Drive and Linda Lane in Camp Springs.

Maryland Route 205
- Location: Waldorf
- Existed: 1989–1997

What is now MD 5 between Leonardtown Road and Poplar Hill Road was constructed as a gravel road by 1927. This road was designated part of MD 233. In 1956, MD 382 was extended west into Charles County along part of what had been MD 233 to MD 5 at Beantown. MD 382 was removed from Charles County in 1989. That same year, MD 205 was assigned to the westernmost portion of Poplar Hill Road in Beantown and north along two-lane Mattawoman–Beantown Road to US 301 and MD 5 at Mattawoman. The route was expanded to a four-lane divided highway and was taken over as MD 5's bypass of Waldorf in 1997. The portion of MD 5 from what had been MD 205's southern terminus west to US 301 became MD 5 Bus.

In February 2007, a $56 million limited-access bypass around Hughesville was completed, redirecting MD 5 to the east of the community. The bypass was built due to the heavy amount of congestion at the old intersection of MD 5 and MD 231 in Hughesville's central business district. Groundbreaking for construction of the bypass took place on November 5, 2004, with $10 million in federal funds given to the project. The old portion of MD 5 that went through Hughesville received the official MD 625 designation in 2006, even though it is signed as MD 5 Bus. The bypass was formally opened on August 8, 2007.

There are plans to improve MD 5 in Prince George's County due to traffic congestion along the route. An interchange was built with MD 373 and Brandywine Road in Brandywine that also widened the route to six lanes in the vicinity of the interchange. Construction of Phase 1, which widened MD 5 to 6 lanes in the vicinity of the interchange, began in November 2009 and was completed in August 2011. Phase 2, which built the interchange itself, went through the design phase, with construction beginning in 2016 and completed in 2020. On February 4, 2019, the intersection with MD 5 and Brandywine Road was replaced with a bridge over MD 5 at the new interchange. In addition, the route is planned to be upgraded to a full freeway between US 301 and the Capital Beltway, with new interchanges at Burch Hill Road/Earnshaw Drive and Surratts Road. This project is currently in the planning stages with many alternatives including upgrading only portions to freeway, adding reversible lanes or high-occupancy vehicle lanes, and various interchange designs.

== Junction list ==
County	Location	mi	km	Destinations	Notes
Saint Mary's	Point Lookout	0.00	0.00	Point Lookout Road south	Southern terminus
Saint Mary's	Ridge	5.01	8.06	MD 235 north (Three Notch Road) – Lexington Park, Waldorf	Southern terminus of MD 235
Saint Mary's	St. Mary's City	10.92	17.57	MD 584 north (Old State House Road)	Southern terminus of MD 584
Saint Mary's	St. Mary's City	11.15	17.94	MD 584 south (Trinity Church Road)	Northern terminus of MD 584
Saint Mary's	Park Hall Estates	13.33	21.45	MD 489 east (Park Hall Road)	Western terminus of MD 489
Saint Mary's	Great Mills	17.20	27.68	MD 246 east (Great Mills Road) – Lexington Park, NAS Patuxent River	Western terminus of MD 246
Saint Mary's	Great Mills	17.46	28.10	MD 471 north (Indian Bridge Road)	Southern terminus of MD 471
Saint Mary's	Callaway	18.65	30.01	MD 249 south (Piney Point Road) – Valley Lee, Tall Timbers, Piney Point, St. George Island	Northern terminus of MD 249
Saint Mary's	Leonardtown	24.71	39.77	MD 244 south (Medleys Neck Road) – Beauvue, Medley's Neck	Northern terminus of MD 244
Saint Mary's	Leonardtown	25.53	41.09	MD 4 north (St. Andrews Church Road) – Lexington Park	Southern terminus of MD 4
Saint Mary's	Leonardtown	26.70	42.97	MD 245 north (Hollywood Road) – Hollywood	Southern terminus of MD 245
Saint Mary's	Leonardtown	28.09	45.21	MD 243 south (Newtowne Neck Road)	Northern terminus of MD 243
Saint Mary's	Leonardtown	28.83	46.40	MD 234 west (Budds Creek Road) – Clements, Potomac River Bridge	Eastern terminus of MD 234
Saint Mary's	Loveville	32.61	52.48	MD 247 north (Loveville Road) to MD 235 – Lexington Park, NAS Patuxent River	Southern terminus of MD 247
Saint Mary's	Morganza	33.67	54.19	MD 242 south (Colton Point Road) – Clements	Northern terminus of MD 242
Saint Mary's	Helen	35.14	56.55	MD 238 west (Chaptico Road) to US 301 – Potomac River Bridge	Eastern terminus of MD 238
Saint Mary's	Oraville	38.32	61.67	MD 235 south (Three Notch Road) – Lexington Park	Northern terminus of MD 235
Saint Mary's	Charlotte Hall	42.55	68.48	MD 236 south (Thompson Corner Road)	Northern terminus of MD 236
Saint Mary's	Charlotte Hall	42.76	68.82	MD 6 (New Market Turner Road) – La Plata, Huntersville	
Charles	Hughesville	46.36	74.61	MD 5 Bus. north (Old Leonardtown Road)	Southern terminus of MD 5 Bus.; access from northbound MD 5 to northbound MD 5 Bus. and from southbound MD 5 Bus. to southbound MD 5; marked as MD 5 Bus. but officially MD 625
Charles	Hughesville	47.08	75.77	MD 231 (Prince Frederick Road) – Prince Frederick, Hughesville	Interchange
Charles	Hughesville	47.92	77.12	MD 5 Bus. south (Old Leonardtown Road)	Northern terminus of MD 5 Bus.; no access from northbound MD 5 to southbound MD 5 Bus.; marked as MD 5 Bus. but officially MD 625
Charles		52.17	83.96	MD 488 west (La Plata Road) – La Plata	Eastern terminus of MD 488
Charles	St. Charles	55.89	89.95	MD 5 Bus. north (Leonardtown Road) / St. Charles Parkway south – Waldorf	Southern terminus of MD 5 Bus.
Charles	Waldorf	59.10	95.11	US 301 south (Crain Highway)	No direct access from northbound MD 5 to southbound US 301; missing connections made via Mattawoman Drive; south end of US 301 overlap
Prince George's	Brandywine	61.75	99.38	US 301 north (Crain Highway) – Baltimore	Northbound exit, southbound entrance; north end of US 301 overlap
Prince George's	Brandywine	62.26	100.20	Brandywine Road to MD 373 (Accokeek Road)	Interchange
Prince George's	Clinton			South end of freeway section	
Prince George's	Clinton	67.05	107.91	MD 223 (Woodyard Road) – Clinton, Melwood	
Prince George's	Clinton	67.64	108.86	Malcolm Road (MD 5M)	Northbound exit and entrance
Prince George's	Clinton	67.64	108.86	Schultz Road	Southbound exit and entrance
Prince George's	Clinton	68.13	109.64	Coventry Way (MD 5L) to Old Branch Avenue – Clinton, Andrews AFB	
Prince George's	Clinton	68.59	110.38	Old Branch Avenue/Kirby Road	Southbound exit
Prince George's	Camp Springs	69.88	112.46	MD 337 north (Allentown Road) – Camp Springs, Andrews AFB	Southern terminus of MD 337
Prince George's	Camp Springs	70.39	113.28	To Manchester Drive (MD 5R)	Northbound exit and entrance
Prince George's	Camp Springs	70.39	113.28	Linda Lane (MD 5Q) to Old Branch Avenue	Southbound exit and entrance
Prince George's	Camp Springs	71.15	114.50	I-95 / I-495 (Capital Beltway) – Baltimore, College Park, Richmond, Alexandria	I-95/I-495 exit 7
Prince George's	Camp Springs	71.34	114.81	Auth Road (MD 535A) – Metro to Nationals Park	Right-in/right-out interchange with northbound MD 5; access to Branch Avenue station
Prince George's	Camp Springs	71.48	115.04	Woods Way	Southbound exit and entrance; access to Branch Avenue station
Prince George's	Camp Springs			North end of freeway section	
Prince George's	Marlow Heights	72.67	116.95	MD 414 (St. Barnabas Road)	Interchange
Prince George's	Hillcrest Heights	73.23	117.85	MD 458 (Silver Hill Road) – Suitland	
Prince George's	Suitland	73.48	118.25	MD 414 west (Bonita Street)	Eastern terminus of MD 414; access from MD 414 to southbound MD 5
Prince George's	Suitland	73.95	119.01	MD 637 west (Naylor Road)	Eastern terminus of MD 637
Prince George's	Suitland	74.27	119.53	Suitland Parkway – Washington	Interchange
Prince George's	Suitland	74.34	119.64	Branch Avenue SE / Southern Avenue SE	District of Columbia line; northern terminus
1.000 mi = 1.609 km; 1.000 km = 0.621 mi: Concurrency terminus; Incomplete access

== Related routes ==
=== Former Leonardtown business route ===
Maryland Route 5 Business
- Location: Leonardtown
- Length: 0.96 mi (1,540 m)
- Existed: circa. 1993–2012

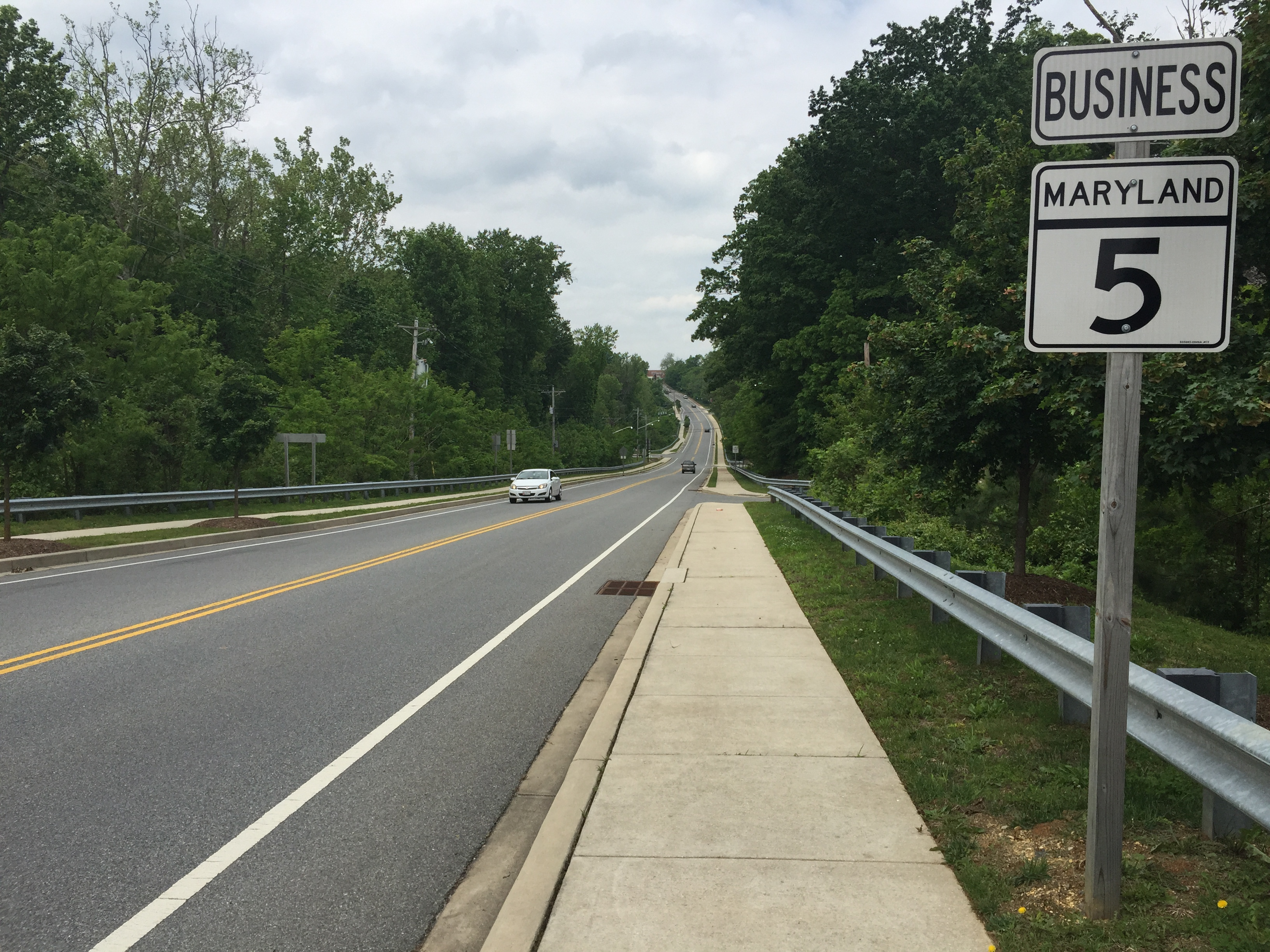
A sign for MD 5 Bus. was still present on Fenwick Street near MD 5 in Leonardtown in 2016

Maryland Route 5 Business (MD 5 Bus.) was a 0.96-mile (1.54 km) business route of MD 5 that looped through the central part of Leonardtown. The route headed west from MD 5 on Fenwick Street, a two-lane undivided road with a traffic count of 7,271 vehicles in 2007. It headed through wooded areas before it reached into the downtown area of Leonardtown. Upon reaching the town center, MD 5 Bus. turned north onto Washington Street, which followed a one-way pair with two lanes in each direction. The road turned into a four-lane undivided road and continued through residential and commercial areas before intersecting MD 5 again. Past here, the road becomes MD 245 (Hollywood Road). The route was decommissioned in 2012 when it was transferred from the state to the town of Leonardtown. Despite being decommissioned, some signs still remain for the route.

=== Hughesville business route ===
Maryland Route 5 Business
- Location: Hughesville
- Length: 1.36 mi (2.19 km)
- Existed: 2006–present

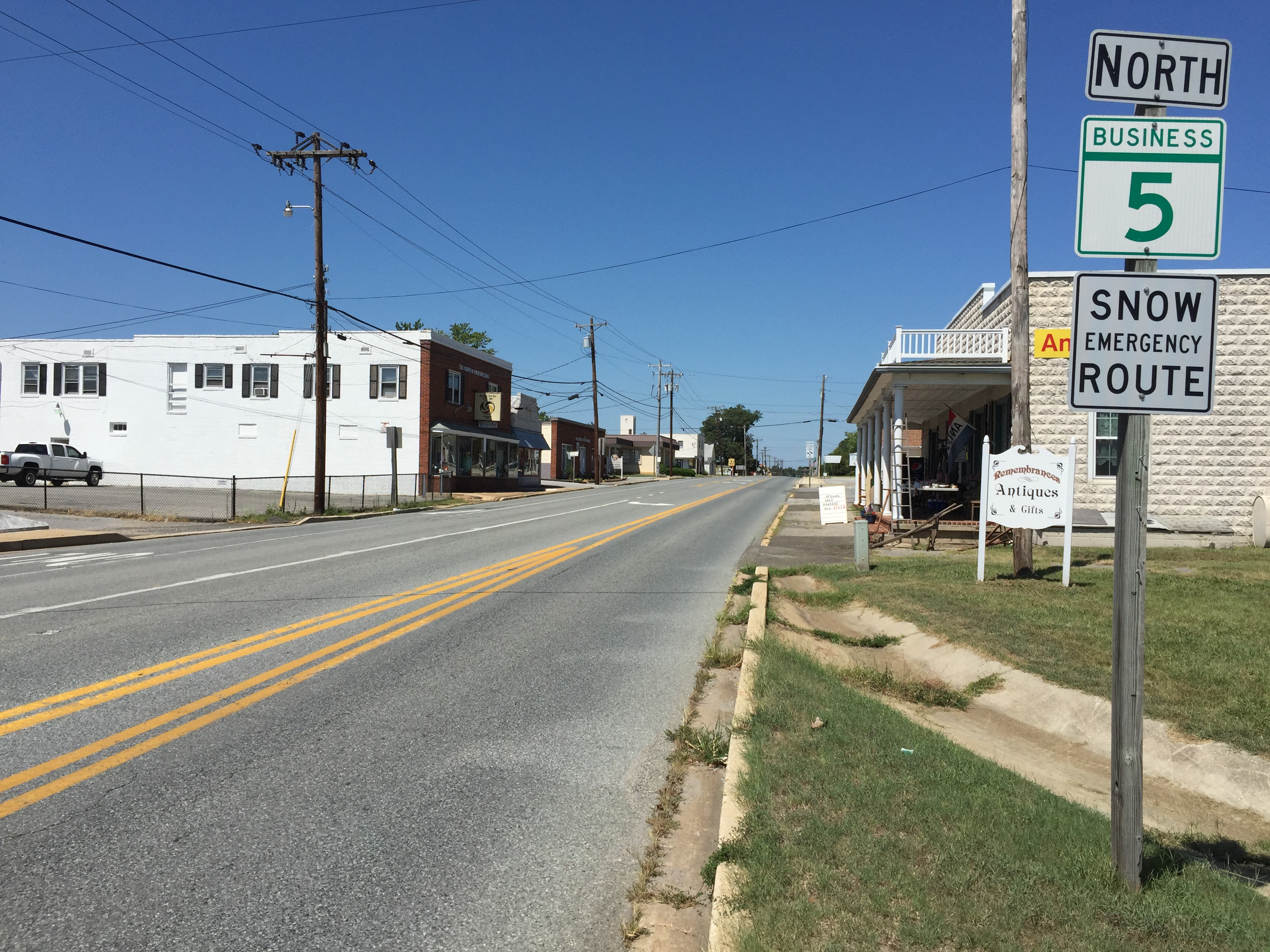
View north along MD 625 (signed as MD 5 Bus.) at MD 231 in Hughesville

Maryland Route 5 Business (MD 5 Bus., officially MD 625 in MDSHA internal documents) is a 1.36-mile (2.19 km) business route that was designated in 2006 along the former alignment of MD 5 in Hughesville after that route was moved to the Hughesville Bypass. The route heads north from MD 5 south of Hughesville on Old Leonardtown Road, a two-lane undivided road with a traffic count of 3,458 vehicles in 2007. It passes a mix of residences and farm fields before becoming a four-lane undivided road and passing businesses in the center of Hughesville, where the route crosses MD 231 (Prince Frederick Road). Past this intersection, the route passes more businesses before narrowing to two lanes and ending at MD 5 north of Hughesville.

=== Waldorf business route ===
Maryland Route 5 Business
- Location: Waldorf
- Length: 1.80 mi (2.90 km)

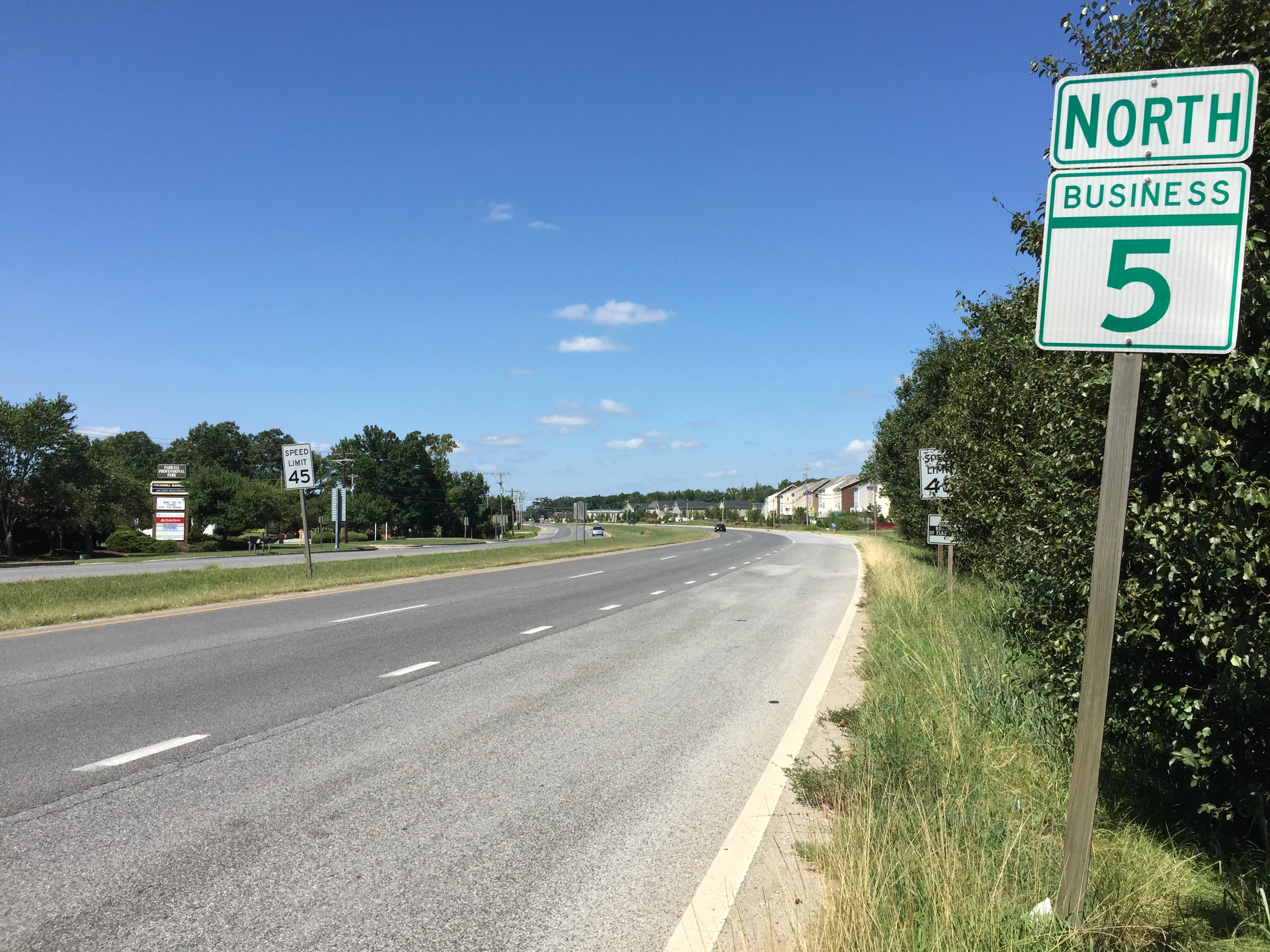
View north along MD 5 Bus. at MD 5 in Waldorf

Maryland Route 5 Business (MD 5 Bus.) is a 1.80-mile (2.90 km) business route that runs along Leonardtown Road between MD 5 in St. Charles and US 301 in Waldorf. The route heads west from MD 5 (Mattawoman Beantown Road) and St. Charles Parkway as a four-lane divided highway with a traffic count of 29,430 vehicles in 2007. The route passes north of Thomas Stone High School before it heads into commercial areas. The median ends and MD 5 Bus. gains a center left-turn lane. It crosses CSX’s Popes Creek Subdivision before coming to an intersection with MD 925 (Old Washington Road). A short distance later, MD 5 Bus. becomes a divided highway again and ends at US 301 (Crain Highway), where the road continues west as MD 228 (Berry Road).

=== Auxiliary routes ===
- MD 5A runs along Old Great Mills Road from MD 5 northeast to MD 246 in Callaway, St. Mary's County. The route is 0.11 mi (0.18 km) long.
- MD 5B runs along an unnamed road from MD 238 north to MD 5 in Helen, St. Mary's County. The route is 0.10 mi (0.16 km) long.
- MD 5C runs along an unnamed road from MD 234 southeast to MD 5 in Leonardtown, St. Mary's County. The route is 0.07 mi (0.11 km) long.
- MD 5F runs along Gaslewbrook Drive from MD 5 north to a dead end in Scotland, St. Mary's County. The route is 0.19 mi (0.31 km) long.
- MD 5G runs along Camp Calvert Road from the beginning of state maintenance north to Fenwick Street in Leonardtown, St. Mary's County. The route is 0.11 mi (0.18 km) long.
- MD 5H runs along Cedar Lane Road from MD 5 east to the end of state maintenance in Leonardtown, St. Mary's County. The route is 0.11 mi (0.18 km) long.
- MD 5I ran along Cedar Lane Court from MD 5 north to MD 5H in Leonardtown, St. Mary's County. The route was 0.15 mi (0.24 km) long. The route was decommissioned in 2012 when it was transferred from the state to the town of Leonardtown.
- MD 5J runs along Eighteen Wheel Drive from a dead end north to MD 5 in St. Mary's County. The route is 0.10 mi (0.16 km) long.
- MD 5K runs along Mattawoman Drive from MD 5 northwest to US 301 in Waldorf, Charles County. The route is 0.20 mi (0.32 km) long.
- MD 5L runs along Coventry Way from the beginning of state maintenance west of MD 967D northeast to an intersection with Old Alexandria Ferry Road in Clinton, Prince George's County, interchanging with MD 5. The route is 0.23 mi (0.37 km) long.
- MD 5M runs along Malcolm Road from an interchange with MD 5 north to the end of state maintenance in Clinton, Prince George's County. The route is 0.09 mi (0.14 km) long.
- MD 5N runs along an exit ramp from southbound MD 5 to Old Branch Avenue/Kirby Road in Clinton, Prince George's County. The route is 0.14 mi (0.23 km) long.
- MD 5P runs along Deer Pond Lane from the end of state maintenance just south of an interchange with the northbound direction of MD 5 northwest to MD 5R in Camp Springs, Prince George's County. The route is 0.25 mi (0.40 km) long.
- MD 5Q runs along Linda Lane from Old Branch Avenue east to an interchange with the southbound direction of MD 5 in Camp Springs, Prince George's County. The route is 0.16 mi (0.26 km) long.
- MD 5R runs along Manchester Drive from Old Branch Avenue east to Ridgecroft Drive in Camp Springs, Prince George's County, passing over MD 5 and intersecting MD 5P. The route is 0.30 mi (0.48 km) long.
- MD 5S runs along Shlagel Road from MD 5 northeast to the end of state maintenance in Waldorf, Charles County. The route is 0.22 mi (0.35 km) long.
