= St. Charles Parkway =

County road in Maryland, USA

St. Charles Parkway is an unnumbered county road in Charles County. It begins at an intersection with U.S. Route 301, here called Rosewick Road (which was built as an extension to the mainline parkway) and heads northeast, bypassing the commercial center of Waldorf. Its name changes to St. Charles Parkway after meeting Radio Station Road, and the route services multiple villages in St. Charles before ending at an intersection with Maryland Route 5 and Maryland Route 5 Business, with MD 5 taking over the roadway as Mattawoman-Beantown Road. This offers a bypass around the often-congested US 301 in Waldorf's commercial center.

St. Charles Parkway serves the following neighborhoods:

- Sentry Woods (part of Huntington Neighborhood/Smallwood Village) via St. Marks Drive
- Wakefield Neighborhood (part of Smallwood Village) via St. Thomas Drive
- Huntington Neighborhood (part of Smallwood Village) via Post Office Road
- Bannister Neighborhood (part of Smallwood Village) via St. Ignatius Drive
- Sheffield Neighborhood (part of Fairway Village) via St. Andrews Drive
- Carrington Neighborhood (part of Smallwood Village) via Dartmouth Road, Cambridge Drive, Duncannon Road, and Kintore Road
- Heritage Active Adult Community (part of Fairway Village) via Demarr Road

According to the St. Charles Master Plan, future neighborhoods and villages that will be served by the Parkway include:

- Gleneagles Neighborhood (will be part of Fairway Village)
- Wooded Glen Village
- Piney Reach Village

White Plains Regional Park, which includes an 18-hole golf course, lighted tennis courts, picnic pavilions, and a playground, is located off of St. Charles Parkway. Also nearby is Regency Furniture Stadium (via Billingsley Road), home of the Southern Maryland Blue Crabs.
