= Billingsley Road =

Road in Maryland, United States

Billingsley Road is a major road in Charles County, Maryland, connecting the town of Indian Head with the communities of Waldorf and Zekiah Valley, and Southern Maryland's three major routes, US Route 301, Maryland Route 5 (MD 5), and MD 210. Initially a two-lane wooded road, it expands to a four-lane divided boulevard after briefly running with Middletown Road.
