= Maryland Route 471 =

State highway in Maryland, USA

Maryland Route 471
- Indian Bridge Road
- Maryland Route 471 highlighted in red

Route information
- Maintained by MDSHA
- Length: 1.01 mi (1.63 km)
- Existed: 1932–present

Major junctions
- South end: MD 5 in Great Mills
- North end: St. Mary's River near Great Mills

Location
- Country: United States
- State: Maryland
- Counties: St. Mary's

Highway system
- Maryland highway system; Interstate; US; State; Scenic Byways
← MD 470	→ MD 472

Maryland Route 471 (MD 471) is a state highway in the U.S. state of Maryland. Known as Indian Bridge Road, the state highway runs 1.01 miles (1.63 km) from MD 5 north to a crossing of the St. Marys River within Great Mills in St. Mary's County. MD 471 was constructed in two segments in the early 1930s. The second segment near Leonardtown was removed from the state highway system in the mid-1950s but returned as an extension of MD 4 in the early 1980s.

== Route description ==
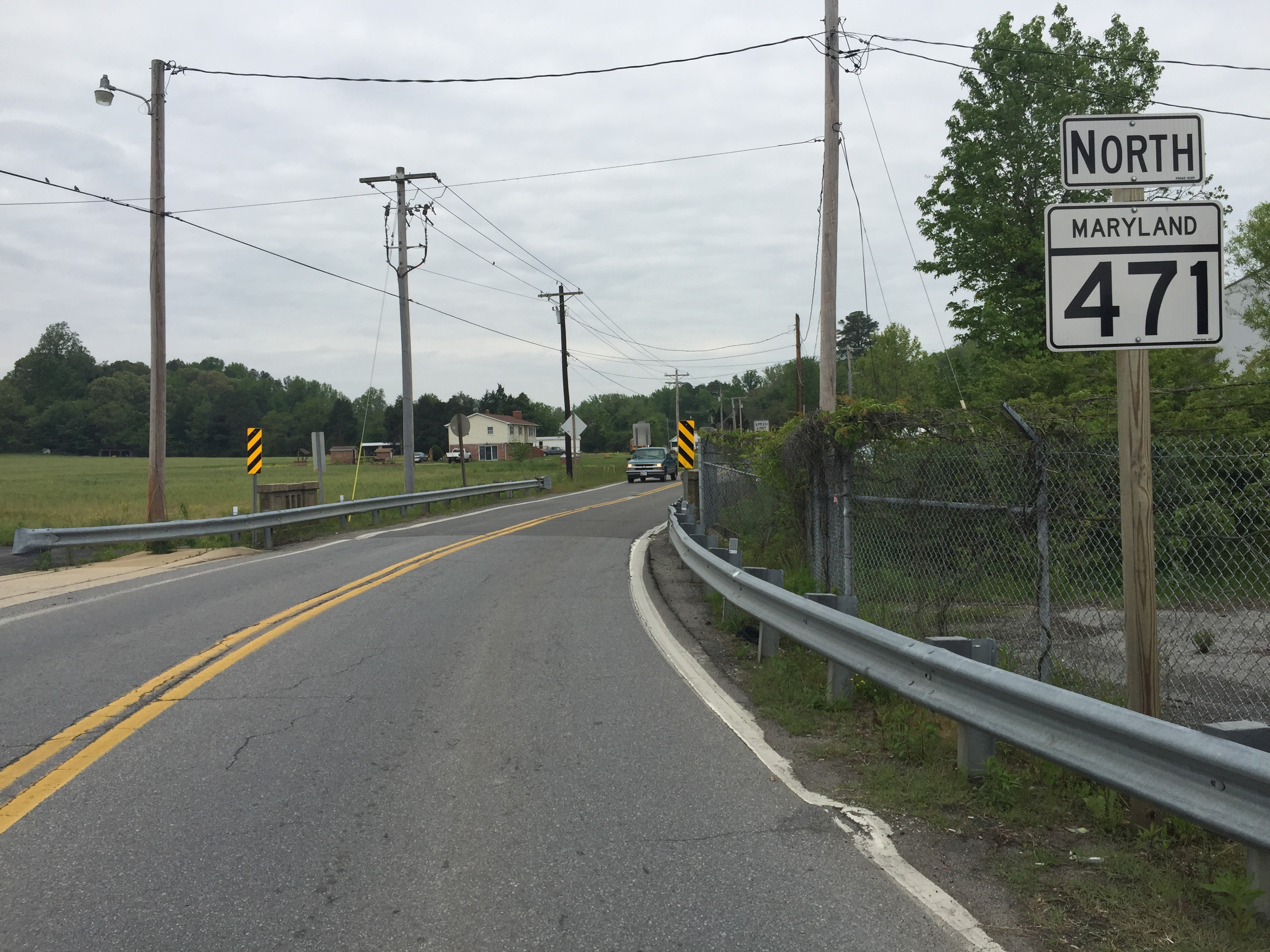
View north from the south end of MD 471 at MD 5 in Great Mills

MD 471 begins at an intersection with MD 5 (Point Lookout Road) and Flat Iron Road in Great Mills. The state highway heads north as an 18-foot (5.5 m) wide two-lane undivided road north through a forested area. MD 471 passes through the cluster of four buildings that is Cecil's Mill Historic District. The state highway continues northwest, crossing the St. Mary's River twice. MD 471 reaches its northern terminus at the northern end of the second bridge over the river. Indian Bridge Road continues northwest as a county highway toward St. Mary's River State Park and an intersection with MD 4 (St. Andrews Church Road) between Leonardtown and California.

== History ==
MD 471 was constructed in two disjoint segments in 1932: the current length of the state highway along Indian Bridge Road and St. Andrews Church Road between MD 5 and Fairgrounds Road near Leonardtown. The latter segment of MD 471 was removed from the state highway system in 1956 but returned when MD 4 was extended west from California to Leonardtown in 1982. The current portion of MD 471 was also transferred to county control in 1956 but returned to the state highway system by 1963.

== Junction list ==
The entire route is in Great Mills, St. Mary's County.

mi	km	Destinations	Notes
0.00	0.00	MD 5 (Point Lookout Road) / Flat Iron Road south – St. Mary's City, Leonardtown	Southern terminus
1.01	1.63	Indian Bridge Road north	Northern terminus; end of state maintenance at St. Marys River
1.000 mi = 1.609 km; 1.000 km = 0.621 mi
