= Maryland Route 243 =

Highway in Maryland

Maryland Route 243
- Newtowne Neck Road
- Map of Southern Maryland with MD 243 highlighted in red

Route information
- Maintained by MDSHA
- Length: 4.66 mi (7.50 km)
- Existed: 1927–present
- Tourist routes: Religious Freedom Byway

Major junctions
- South end: St. Francis Xavier Church near Compton
- North end: MD 5 in Leonardtown

Location
- Country: United States
- State: Maryland
- Counties: St. Mary's

Highway system
- Maryland highway system; Interstate; US; State; Scenic Byways
← MD 242	→ MD 244

Maryland Route 243 (MD 243) is a state highway in the U.S. state of Maryland. Known as Newtowne Neck Road, the state highway runs 4.66 miles (7.50 km) from St. Francis Xavier Church near Compton north to MD 5 in Leonardtown. MD 243 serves communities on the Newtowne Neck peninsula between St. Clements Bay to the west and Breton Bay to the east in central St. Mary's County. The state highway was constructed between the early 1920s and early 1930s. MD 243 was relocated at its northern terminus in the 1970s.

== Route description ==
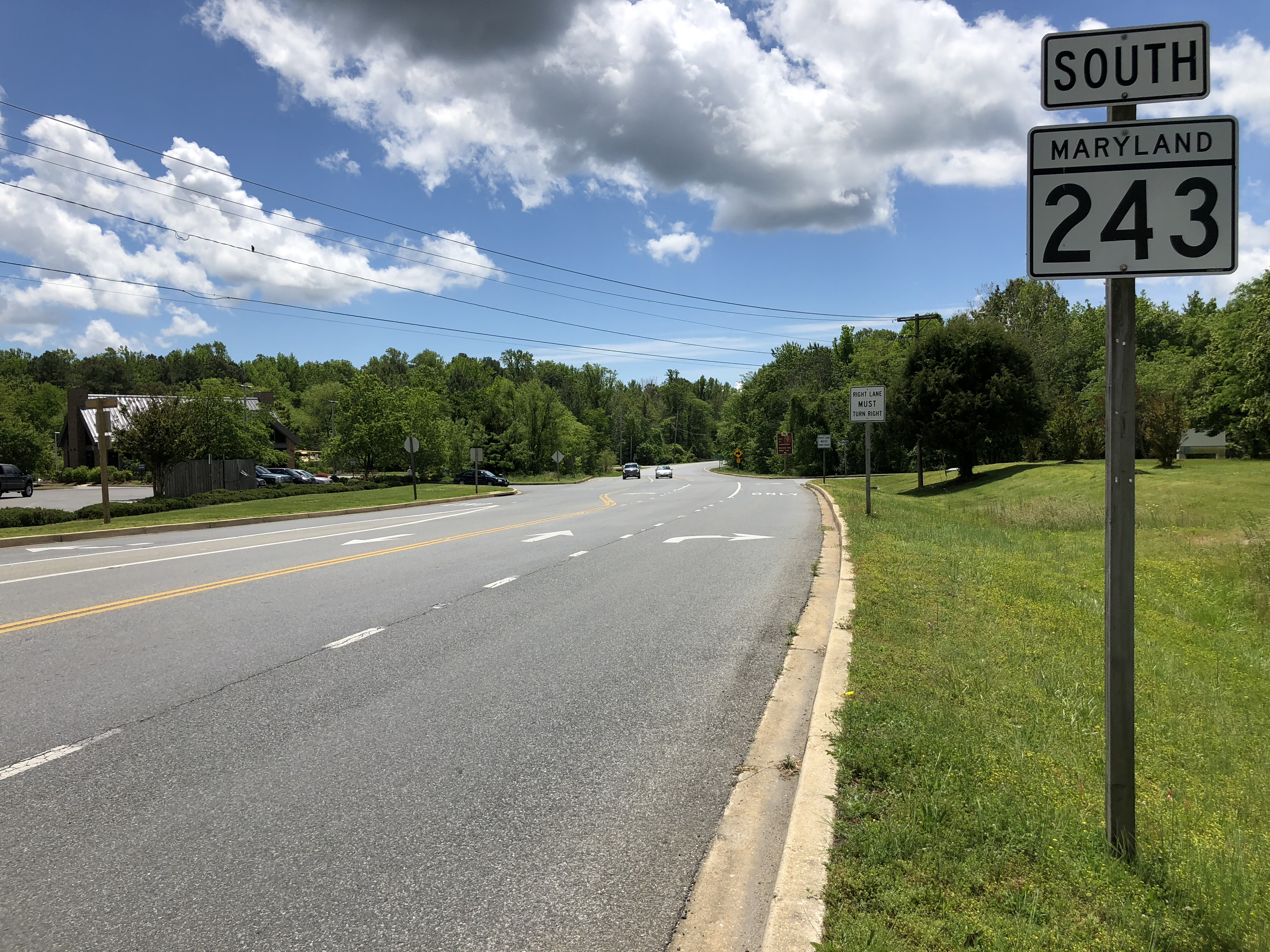
View south from the north end of MD 243 at MD 5 in Leonardtown

MD 243 begins at a road west of St. Francis Xavier Church within the St. Francis Xavier Church and Newtown Manor House Historic District. The road continues south toward the Potomac River as a narrow county-maintained street. The state highway heads west as a two-lane undivided road through the postage-stamp historic district and curves to the north, meeting Newtowne Neck Road on a tangent. That county-maintained portion of Newtowne Neck Road heads south to the end of the Newtowne Neck peninsula. MD 243 heads north through a mix of farmland and forest to the hamlet of Compton, where the highway intersects Bayside Road, which leads north to the waterfront community of St. Clement Shores. The state highway veers northeast and intersects Bull Road, which leads southeast to the Society Hill neighborhood and Breton Bay Country Club. MD 243 continues north, crossing Nelson Run and briefly entering the town of Leonardtown before the highway reaches its northern terminus at MD 5 (Point Lookout Road).

== History ==
MD 243 was constructed as a gravel road in four sections between the early 1920s and early 1930s. The highway was built from MD 5 to Wathen Road around 1923. MD 243 was extended south to Rosebank Road in Compton in 1924. The state highway was extended slightly south to Bayside Road in 1930. Finally, MD 243 was extended south to its present terminus at St. Francis Xavier Church in 1932. MD 243's original northern terminus was adjacent to McIntosh Run, to the east of its present terminus. MD 243's intersection with MD 5 was relocated to form a four-way intersection with Maypole Road by 1978; the segment of old alignment between MD 243 and MD 5 was designated MD 943. This portion of MD 943, a number later assigned to Warren Road in Cockeysville in Baltimore County, was removed from the state highway system in 1999.

== Junction list ==
The entire route is in St. Mary's County.

Location	mi	km	Destinations	Notes
Compton	0.00	0.00	St. Francis Xavier Church	Southern terminus
Leonardtown	4.66	7.50	MD 5 (Point Lookout Road) / Maypole Road north – St. Mary's City, Waldorf	Northern terminus
1.000 mi = 1.609 km; 1.000 km = 0.621 mi
