= The River View =

Historic house in Maryland, United States

- U.S. National Register of Historic Places
- Location within Maryland Location within the United States
- Nearest city: Oakley, Maryland
- Coordinates: 38°15′47″N 76°43′50″W
- Built: 1816
- NRHP reference No.: 76002170
- Added to NRHP: May 4, 1976

The River View is a historic home located at Oakley, St. Mary's County, Maryland, United States. It is a 1 1/2-story, Flemish bond brick house that is one of the best preserved examples of its type in Lower Southern Maryland. It was built by the Gardiner family in the early 18th century, then purchased by Ignatius Fenwick, a prominent military figure in Maryland's Revolutionary War Navy. Also on the property are a number of early domestic dependencies that comprise the largest single collection of such buildings in St. Mary's County.

The River View was listed on the National Register of Historic Places in 1976.
