= Morganza, Maryland =

Unincorporated community in Maryland, U.S.

Coordinates: 38°22′31″N 76°41′44″W

Morganza is an unincorporated community in St. Mary's County, Maryland, United States.

Today, it is home to a few homes and St. Joseph's Catholic Church, which has been in the area since 1759. The current church on Route 5 at the top of the hill was built in 1860 and the Morganza Post Office was established there in 1867, named after the Morgan family. The post office is now located across from Chopticon High School.

Morganza was home to two public one-room school houses, and the church opened a parochial school for white students in 1926 and for black children in 1927. These schools were begun by John LaFarge, S.J. He is noted for his many interracial writings and activities. Fr LaFarge was quoted as having said that his ministry among both the white and Afro-American parishioners taught him about racial injustice.

St. Joseph's original cemetery is located at the bottom of the hill along Route 5 and for many years was forgotten under dense underbrush, but has since been cleared. The current 4-acre (16,000 m^{2}) cemetery across from St. Joseph's was purchased in 1904.

The ZIP Code for Morganza is 20660.
