= Oakley, Maryland =

Unincorporated community in Maryland, U.S.

Coordinates: 38°16′22″N 76°44′23″W

Oakley is an unincorporated community in St. Mary's County, Maryland, United States. The River View (a historic home located in Oakley) was listed on the National Register of Historic Places in 1976.
