= Avenue, Maryland =

Unincorporated community in Maryland, U.S.

Coordinates: 38°15′22″N 76°46′04″W

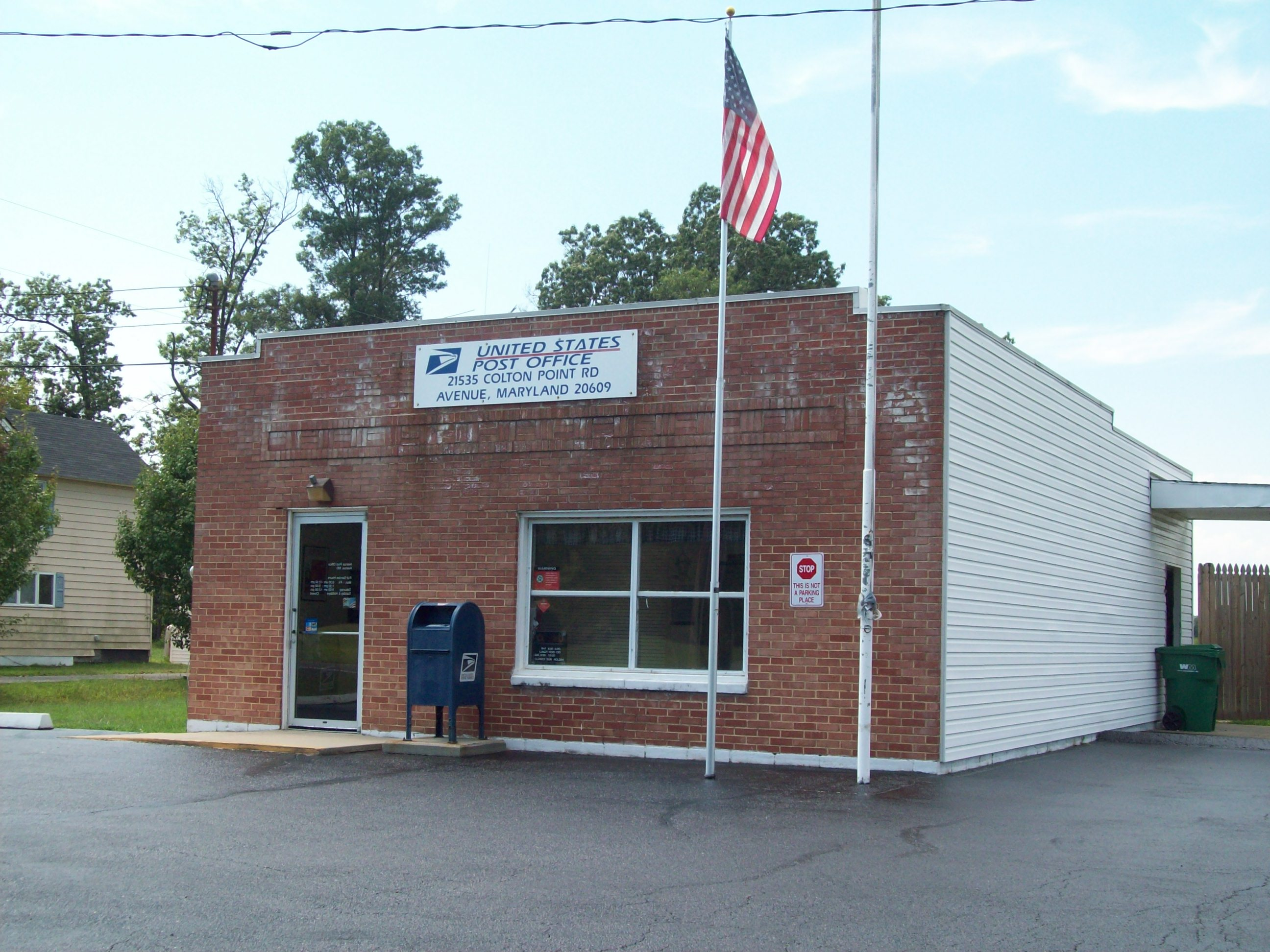
U.S. Post Office, Avenue, Maryland, September 2009

Avenue is an unincorporated community in what is familiarly called the "Seventh District" of St. Mary's County, Maryland, United States.
