= Helen, Maryland =

Unincorporated community

Coordinates: 38°22′58″N 76°43′18″W

Helen is an unincorporated community in St. Mary's County, Maryland, United States and is located near Mechanicsville. It was the hometown of French Forrest. The ZIP Code for Helen is 20635.
