= Maddox, Maryland =

Unincorporated community in Maryland, U.S.

Coordinates: 38°19′57″N 76°48′42″W

Maddox is an unincorporated community in St. Mary's County, Maryland, United States.
