= Governor Harry W. Nice Memorial Bridge =

Governor Harry W. Nice Memorial/Senator Thomas "Mac" Middleton Bridge
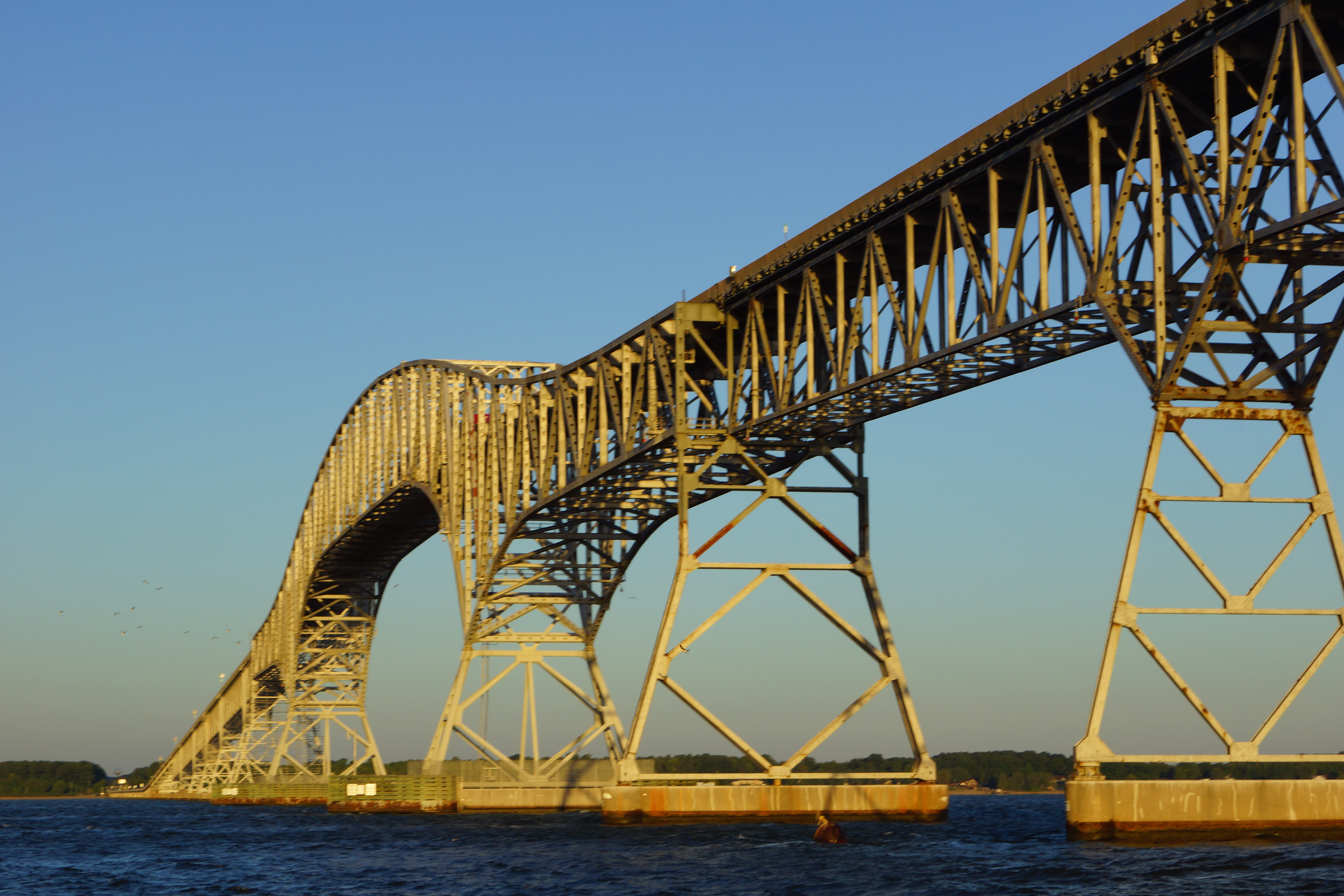
- The original bridge, which was replaced in 2022.
- Coordinates: 38.3618°N 76.9934°W
- Carries: 4 lanes of US 301
- Crosses: Potomac River
- Locale: Dahlgren, Virginia and Newburg, Maryland
- Maintained by: Maryland Transportation Authority

Characteristics
- Design: Continuous truss bridge
- Total length: 1.7 mi (2.7 km)
- Longest span: 800 ft (240 m)
- Clearance below: 135 ft (41 m)

History
- Designer: J. E. Greiner Company
- Construction start: March 1938
- Construction cost: $5 million
- Opened: December 1940

Statistics
- Daily traffic: 17,500 (2014)
- Toll: $9.00 (southbound) per two-axle vehicle beginning July 1, 2013; E-ZPass accepted

Location
- Interactive map of Governor Harry W. Nice Memorial/Senator Thomas "Mac" Middleton Bridge

The Governor Harry W. Nice Memorial/Senator Thomas "Mac" Middleton Bridge, also known as the Potomac River Bridge, is a 1.7-mile (2.7 km), four-lane bridge that spans the Potomac River between Newburg in Charles County, Maryland, and Dahlgren in King George County, Virginia, United States. It is one of eight toll facilities operated by the Maryland Transportation Authority, and is one of two toll bridges over the Potomac River. The other, the privately owned Oldtown Low Water Toll Bridge, connects Maryland and West Virginia, far upstream. The new Nice Bridge opened to traffic in October 2022. Demolition of the original bridge began on March 21, 2023.

== Overview ==
This four lane bridge carries U.S. Route 301, which is a spur of U.S. Route 1 and a popular north–south alternative for bypassing the Baltimore-Washington Metropolitan Area and its frequently congested roads such as Interstate 95, Interstate 495 (Capital Beltway), and the Woodrow Wilson Bridge to the north along the Potomac River. In 2014, the bridge handled approximately 6.4 million vehicles, with a daily average of approximately 17,500.

=== Congestion ===
Since the late 2000s, the bridge was known to experience significant traffic congestion due to its design, combined with increasing traffic from Southern Maryland, particularly as it peaks on holidays and weekends. The bridge was narrow (one 11-foot (3.4 m) lane in each direction with no shoulders), steep (up to 3.75 percent grade), and had a reduced speed limit (50 mph (80 km/h) on the main span, even slower through the southbound toll gates and plaza). By contrast, the approach roads on both sides of the bridge feature four 12-foot (3.7 m) lanes (2 in each direction), full shoulders, and 55 mph (89 km/h) speed limits. This combination forced vehicles to slow and merge as they cross the bridge, which often resulted in backups.

In response to the bridge's traffic issues, the Maryland Transportation Authority initiated the Governor Harry W. Nice Memorial Bridge Improvement Project in June 2006, which would contemplate improvement of bridge traffic either by widening the bridge or by replacing it altogether. Planning continued for another year, and by the end of 2007, The Washington Post reported that six alternatives had been identified. Ultimately, the decision was made to replace the bridge altogether five years later with a wider one with two lanes per direction.

== History ==
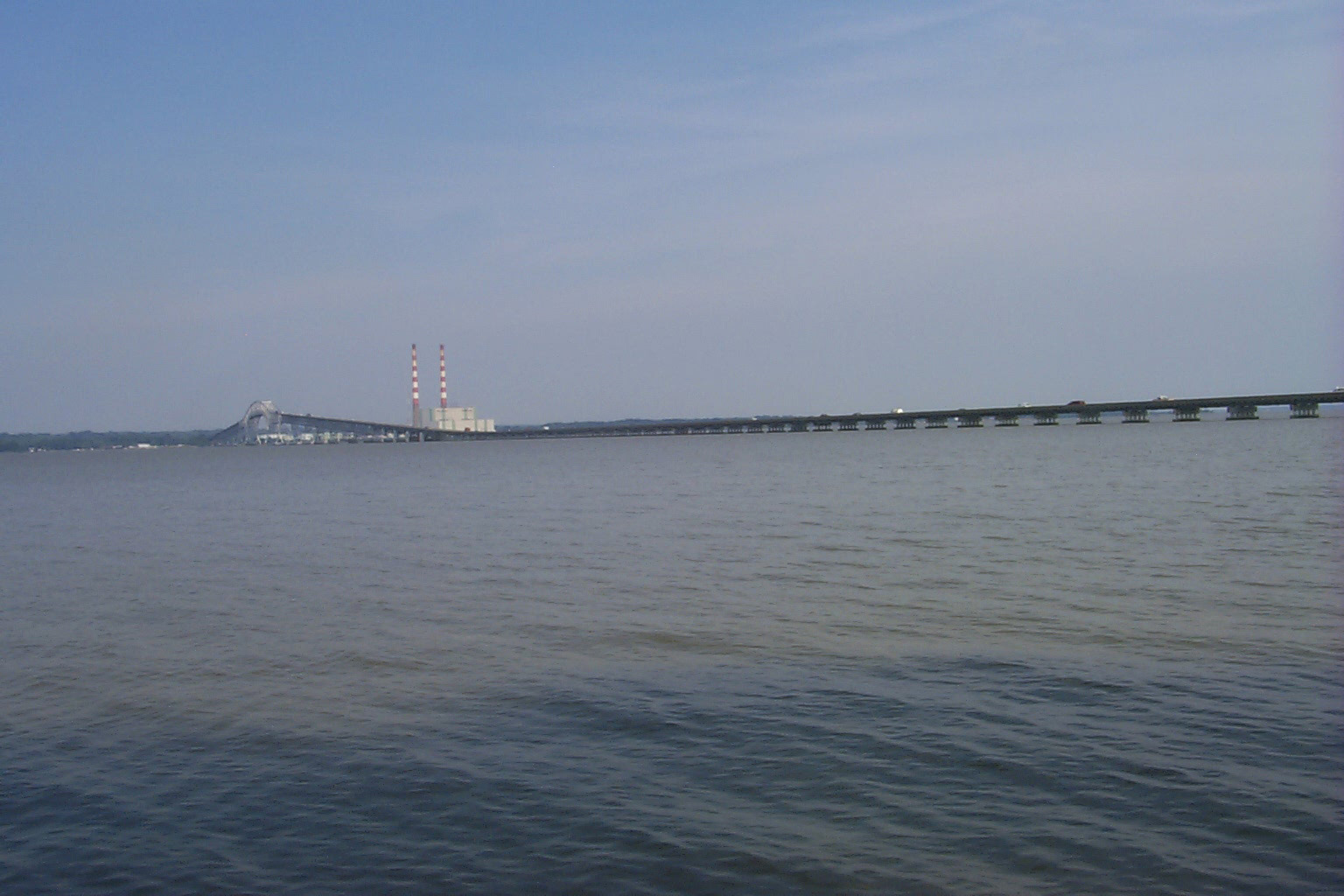
Wide view of the original bridge

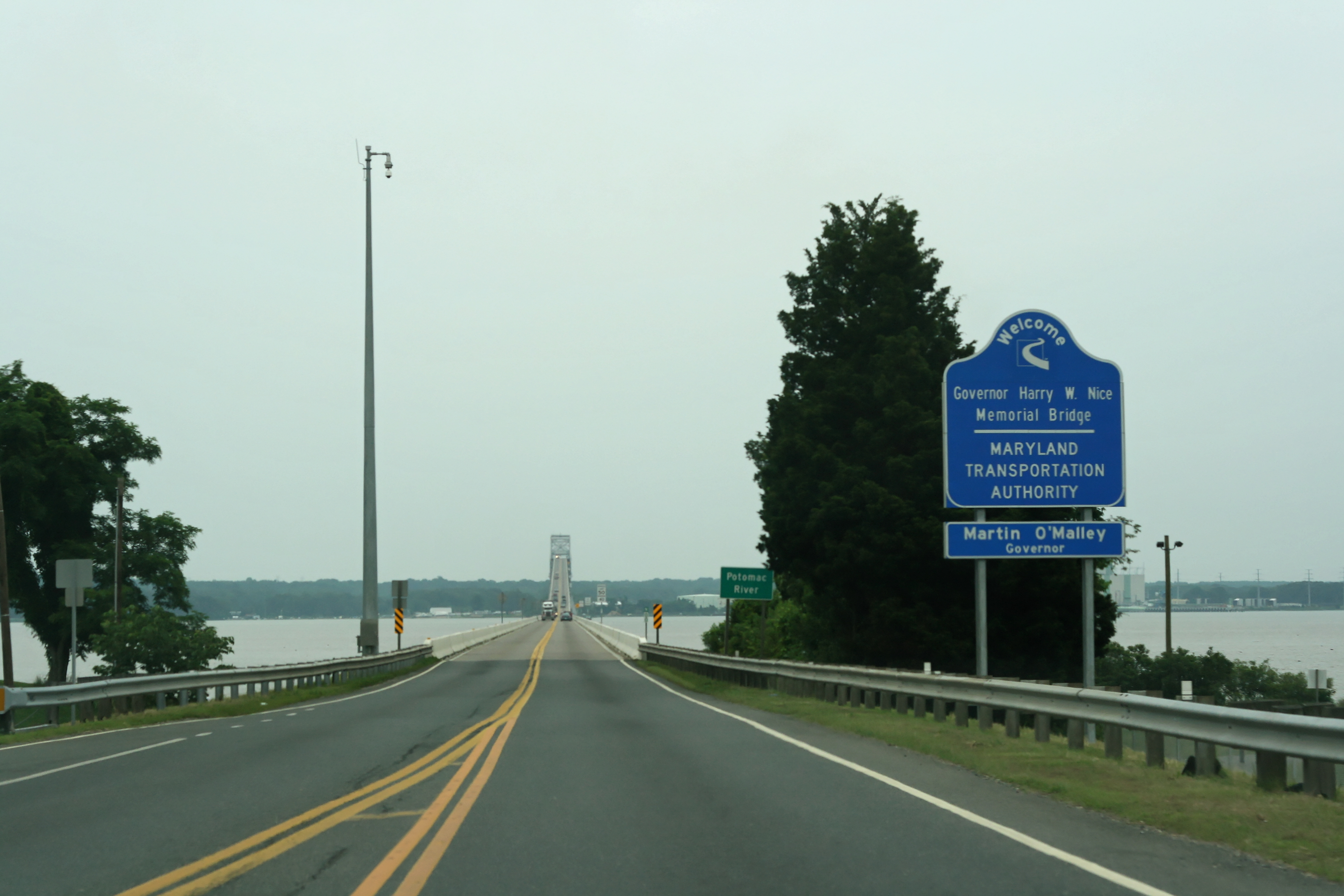
A photograph of the original Harry W. Nice Bridge taken from Virginia. The border with Maryland is at the foreground shoreline.

President Franklin D. Roosevelt presided over the ground-breaking ceremony for the bridge in 1938. Known as the Potomac River Bridge when opened in December 1940, the bridge was renamed in 1967 for Harry W. Nice (1877–1941) who served as governor of Maryland from 1935 to 1939. The bridge was the first south of Washington, D.C. to provide a highway link between Maryland and Virginia. In October 2018, the name of retiring state Senator Thomas M. Middleton was added to the bridge, making it officially the Governor Harry W. Nice Memorial/Senator Thomas "Mac" Middleton Bridge.

In March 2020, all-electronic tolling was implemented as a result of the COVID-19 pandemic, with tolls payable through E-ZPass or Video Tolling, which uses automatic license plate recognition. All-electronic tolling was made permanent in August 2020.

=== Construction of replacement bridge ===
In December 2012, it was reported that the Maryland Transportation Authority (MDTA) completed a study of the Nice Bridge and received approval from the federal government to replace the current structure with a span with four lanes and a bike/pedestrian path, to be located just north of the existing bridge, which will be removed upon completion of the replacement crossing. The MDTA estimated the cost of a replacement span at about $850 million, but funding was not identified as of 2012. The project is being coordinated with the Virginia Department of Transportation (VDOT), and is proceeding in conjunction with the Maryland State Highway Administration's U.S. Route 301 South Corridor Transportation Study and the U.S. Route 301 Waldorf Area Transportation Improvements Project.

On November 21, 2013, Governor Martin O’Malley announced that the MDTA Board has approved an additional $50 million in its final six-year capital program (FY 2014 – FY 2019) to fund initial design and right-of-way acquisition for the project to replace the Governor Harry W. Nice Memorial Bridge (US 301), which connects Charles County, Maryland and King George County, Virginia, across the Potomac River. The planning phase of the project was completed in fall 2012. The selected alternative consists of a new four-lane bridge built parallel to, and north of, the existing bridge, which would be removed upon completion of the new bridge. Opposition to a new bridge from Governor Larry Hogan had prevented construction from being scheduled.

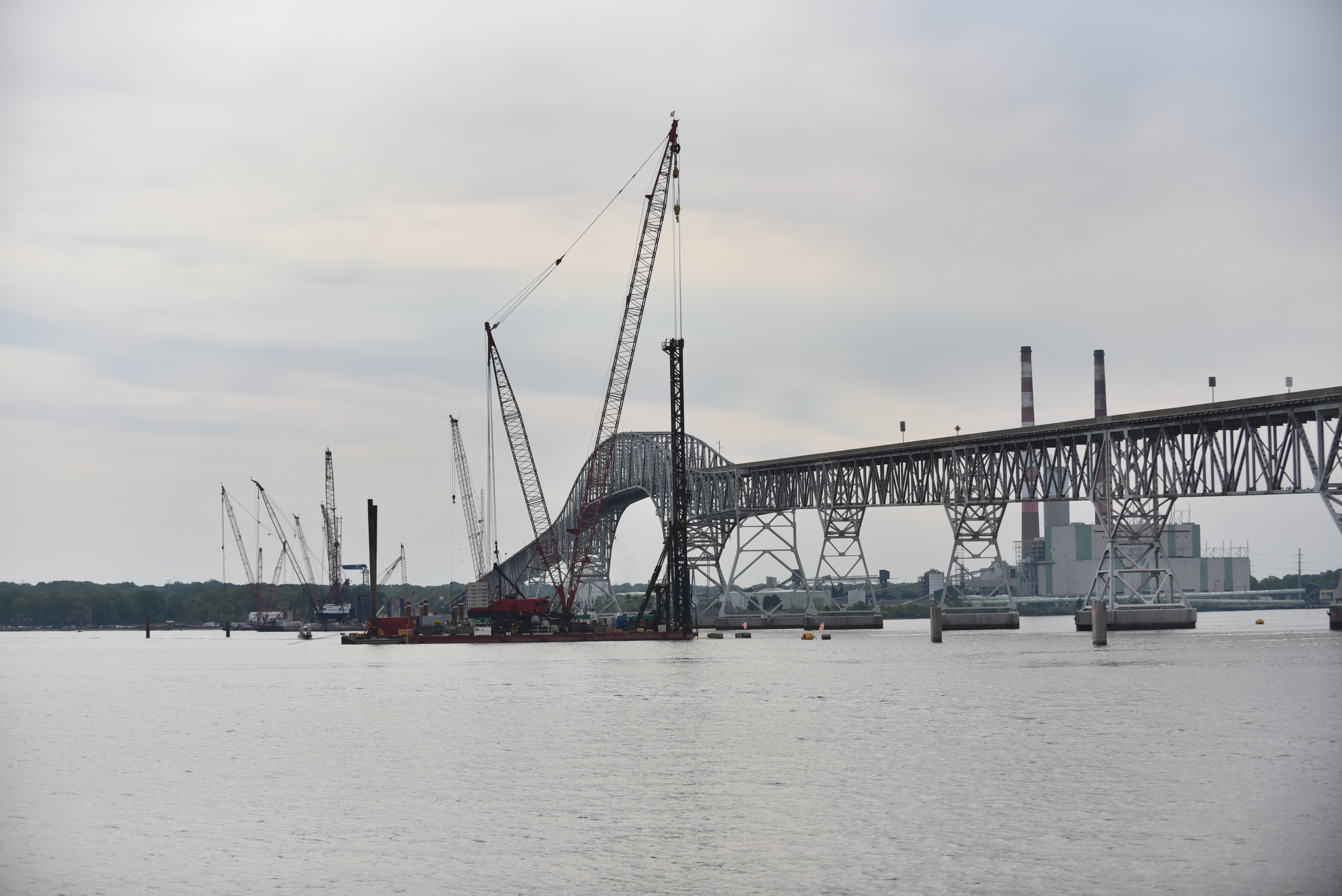
Early construction on the replacement bridge, April 2021

However, on November 21, 2016, the Maryland Transportation Authority Board voted unanimously to build a new, 4-lane bridge just north of the current structure. Construction began in July 2020. A ribbon-cutting ceremony for the new bridge was held on October 12, 2022, with Governor Hogan in attendance, while the bridge opened to traffic the following day. The approved bridge design has several design alterations which shave more than $200 million from the originally projected price of around $1 billion, allowing Governor Hogan to shift his support in favor of the bridge. One of the major redesign choices was the removal of the multi-use path for pedestrians and bicycles, citing low projected usage; in its stead, Will Pines, chief engineer of the MDTA, states that the bridge will be open for cyclists to share the lane with motor vehicles, similar to the present arrangement on the Thomas J. Hatem Bridge on US 40. Demolition of the old bridge began on March 21, 2023. Materials from the demolition will be used to create an artificial reef that can provide new shelter for marine life in the river.

==== Bike lane exclusion and old bridge demolition controversies ====
Former Majority Leader of the United States House of Representatives Steny Hoyer, along with US Senators Ben Cardin and Chris Van Hollen, objected to plans to demolish the old bridge following the new one's completion, suggesting an independent study be conducted to explore the possibility that the old bridge itself could be used for recreational and bike traffic, but Transportation Secretary Jim Ports countered by contending that financial and logistical challenges were too great to keep the old bridge in place. However, bicycle advocacy groups, which include Potomac Heritage Trail Association, Dahlgren Railroad Heritage Association and Oxon Hill Bicycle and Trail Club, allege in a complaint filed in the U.S. District Court for the District of Maryland, that state agencies, including the MDTA, violated state and federal environmental review laws by changing the project from its original conception and failing to study the impact of demolishing the bridge. The groups, who are asking for a temporary restraining order, to halt the demolition, also allege that the authority lacks the power to destroy the bridge under environmental laws, stating in a complaint, "Using explosives to demolish parts of the Historic Nice Bridge or the rubble from the bridge to create a 'reef' has not been evaluated appropriately for the impact on the natural habitat and human environment, including the taking of endangered species or disruption of their habitats."

The plaintiffs also allege that the defendants never considered the “cumulative effects” of the construction plan and the potential demolition of the old bridge on human, environmental and historic resources, as well as on publicly or privately owned landmark sites listed or eligible for inclusion in the National Register of Historic Places. The future of the old bridge fell to U.S. District Judge Deborah L. Boardman, who declined to issue an injunction blocking the demolition Tuesday, October 11, 2022, saying after a three-hour hearing that the groups had not met standards to halt the plans — a pause the state estimated would cost taxpayers $21,500 each day. The decision appeared to end a years-long dispute, part of a battle over how to accommodate non-drivers on a major river crossing that was designed to last a century. Demolition began on March 21, 2023.
