= Coltons Point, Maryland =

Unincorporated community in Maryland, US

Coordinates: 38°13′28″N 76°45′12″W

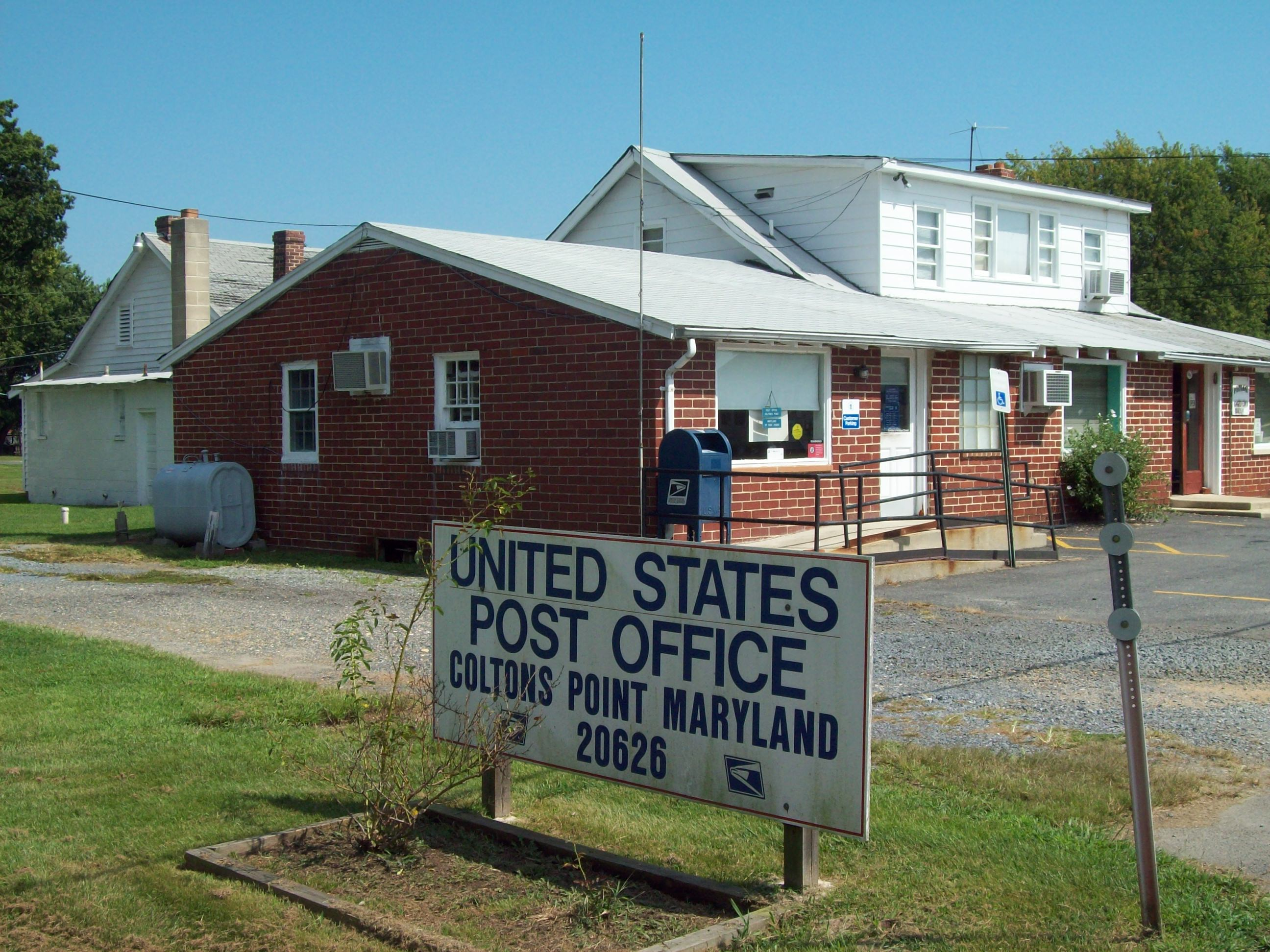
U.S. Post Office, Coltons Point, MD, September 2009

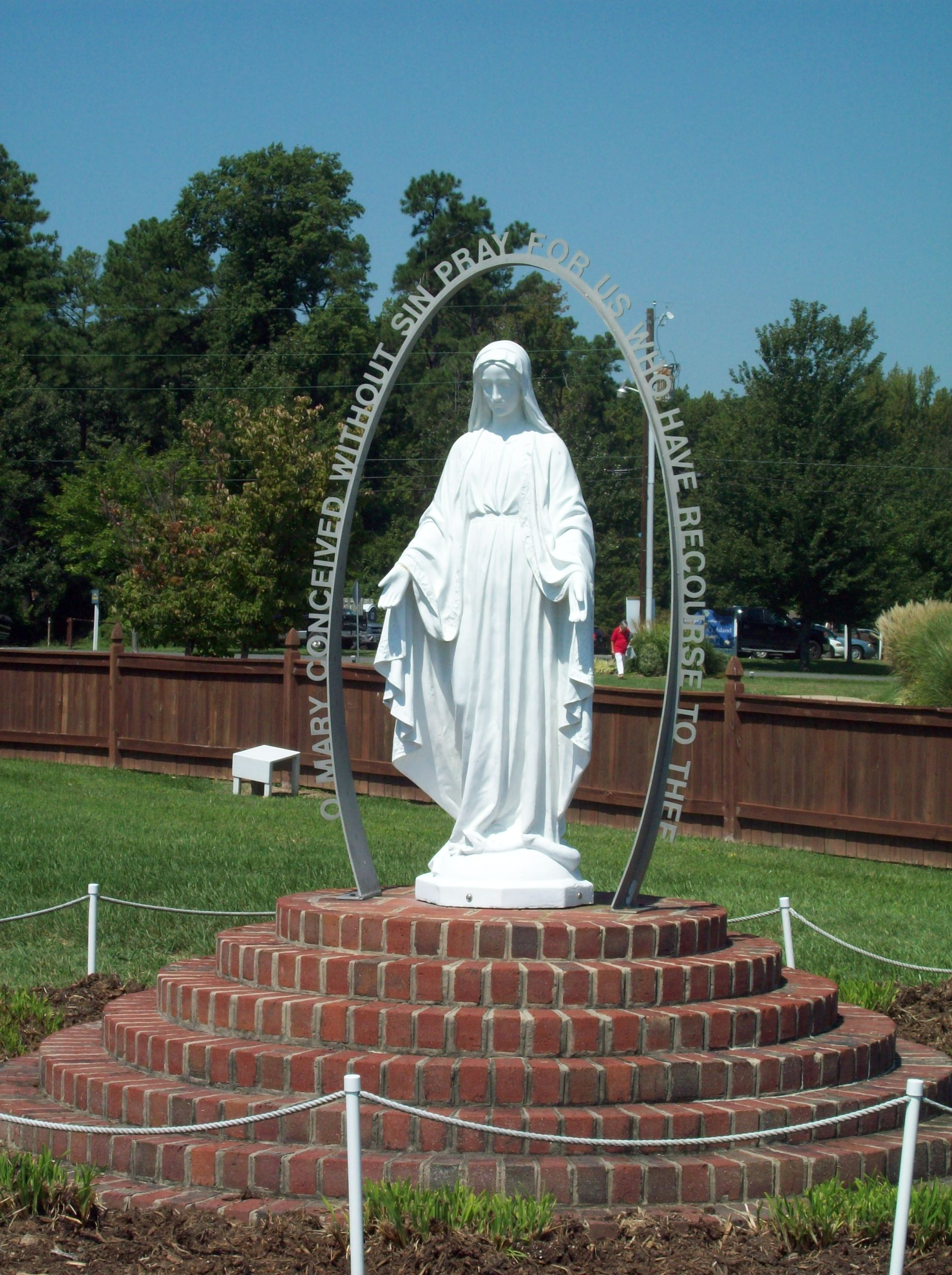
Miraculous Medal Monument, Coltons Point MD, September 2009

Coltons Point is an unincorporated community in what is popularly called the "Seventh District" of St. Mary's County, Maryland, United States. A small historical museum and a lighthouse are located there. Seasonal boat service carry visitors the short distance to the shrinking, uninhabited St. Clement's Island, where in 1634 the first European settlers arriving in Maryland landed and celebrated the first Catholic Mass in English-speaking North America. It was listed on the National Register of Historic Places in 1972. The ZIP Code for Coltons Point is 20626. The miraculous medal monument shown below has been moved to the property of a church in Mechanicsville.
