= Clements, Maryland =

Unincorporated community in Maryland, U.S.

Coordinates: 38°19′34″N 76°43′38″W

Clements in Maryland

Clements is an unincorporated community in St. Mary's County, Maryland, United States. Clements is located in northern St. Mary's County. ZIP Code 20624—Area Code 301—Time Zone Eastern—Population 1,282. It is 4 miles from the county seat of Leonardtown.

The community derives its name from Saint Clement parish on the island of Jersey.
