= National Register of Historic Places listings in St. Mary's County, Maryland =

Location of St. Mary's County in Maryland

This is a list of the National Register of Historic Places listings in St. Mary's County, Maryland.

This is intended to be a complete list of the properties and districts on the National Register of Historic Places in St. Mary's County, Maryland, United States. Latitude and longitude coordinates are provided for many National Register properties and districts; these locations may be seen together in a map.

There are 32 properties and districts listed on the National Register in the county, including 3 National Historic Landmarks.

Contents: Counties in Maryland
Allegany - Anne Arundel - Baltimore (city) - Baltimore County - Calvert - Caroline - Carroll - Cecil - Charles - Dorchester - Frederick - Garrett - Harford - Howard - Kent - Montgomery - Prince George's - Queen Anne's - Somerset - St. Mary's - Talbot - Washington - Wicomico - Worcester

This National Park Service list is complete through NPS recent listings posted December 12, 2025.

== Current listings ==
	Name on the Register	Image	Date listed	Location	City or town	Description
1	Abell House	Abell House	December 22, 2003 (#03001324)	22530 Washington St., Maryland Route 326; 38°17′20″N 76°38′16″W	Leonardtown	Queen Anne style house constructed in 1910.
2	All Faith Church	All Faith Church	December 29, 2003 (#03001328)	38885 New Market Turner Rd. 38°27′37″N 76°43′50″W	Charlotte Hall	Georgian style church constructed 1766-1769.
3	Bachelor's Hope	Bachelor's Hope	November 7, 1972 (#72001483)	Off Maryland Route 238; 38°20′09″N 76°47′25″W	Chaptico	Brick 18th century dwelling built in the "Great Hall" plan.
4	Bard's Field	Bard's Field	November 7, 1976 (#76002172)	1.2 miles (1.9 km) west of Ridge off Curleys Rd. 38°05′53″N 76°23′01″W	Ridge	Early 19th century frame dwelling with double exterior end chimneys.
5	Buena Vista		August 19, 1998 (#98000997)	Maryland Route 5, west of the junction of Maryland Routes 245 and 379; 38°17′52″N 76°38′12″W	Leonardtown	Greek Revival-style frame dwelling built between 1840 and 1850.
6	Cecil's Mill Historic District	Cecil's Mill Historic District	January 30, 1978 (#78003121)	North of Great Mills on Indian Bridge Rd. 38°14′25″N 76°30′13″W	Great Mills	Consists of mill, general store, home, and abandoned Catholic church.
7	Charlotte Hall Historic District	Charlotte Hall Historic District	May 2, 1975 (#75002085)	South of Hughesville at the junction of Maryland Routes 5 and 6; 38°28′39″N 76°46′40″W	Charlotte Hall	Consists of remains of Charlotte Hall Military Academy and local structures.
8	Christ Episcopal Church	Christ Episcopal Church	July 25, 1994 (#94000728)	Maryland Route 238 (Maddox Rd.) southeast of its junction with Maryland Route 234; 38°21′57″N 76°47′02″W	Chaptico	Brick church constructed in 1736.
9	Cross Manor	Cross Manor	October 6, 1988 (#88001705)	Cross Manor Rd. 38°09′40″N 76°25′23″W	St. Inigoes	Dwelling built about 1789, with additions during the 19th century.
10	De La Brooke Tobacco Barn		December 29, 2015 (#15000941)	De La Brooke Rd. 38°26′19″N 76°39′20″W	Oraville vicinity	
11	Deep Falls	Deep Falls	May 12, 1975 (#75002084)	1-mile (1.6 km) southeast of Chaptico on the northern side of Maryland Route 234; 38°21′29″N 76°45′27″W	Chaptico	Dwelling reportedly built in 1745; ancestral home of the descendants of Maryland Governor James Thomas.
12	MARY W.SOMERS (Chesapeake Bay skipjack)		October 8, 1976 (#76002173)	Southeast of St. Marys City at St. Inigoe's Creek; 38°27′12″N 77°03′06″W	St. Mary's City	Chesapeake Bay skipjack, built in 1904.
13	Mattapany-Sewall Archeological Site	Mattapany-Sewall Archeological Site	February 1, 1985 (#85000164)	Address Restricted	Lexington Park	Site of Mattapany-Sewall, a manor established in 1663 and occupied from 1666 to 1684 by Charles Calvert, 3rd Baron Baltimore.
14	Mulberry Fields	Mulberry Fields	March 14, 1973 (#73002169)	About 4.5 miles (7.2 km) southeast of Beauvue off Maryland Route 244; 38°12′32″N 76°34′22″W	Beauvue	Georgian-style "mansion-type" brick dwelling built about 1763.
15	Ocean Hall	Ocean Hall	October 25, 1973 (#73002170)	Bushwood Rd. off Maryland Route 239 at Bushwood Wharf; 38°17′01″N 76°48′10″W	Bushwood	Dwelling believed to have been built about 1670.
16	Piney Point Coast Guard Light Station	Piney Point Coast Guard Light Station	June 16, 1976 (#76002171)	West of Piney Point on Maryland Route 498; 38°08′06″N 76°31′47″W	Piney Point	Lighthouse built in 1836 and decommissioned in 1964; now operated as museum.
17	Point No Point Light Station	Point No Point Light Station	December 2, 2002 (#02001425)	Approximately 2 miles (3.2 km) east-southeast of Point No Point; 38°07′40″N 76°17′27″W	Dameron	Lighthouse constructed in 1902; first lit in 1905; automated in 1938.
18	Porto Bello	Porto Bello	April 26, 1972 (#72001486)	Maryland Route 244 east of Drayden; 38°10′26″N 76°27′07″W	Drayden	Brick dwelling built after 1742.
19	The River View		May 4, 1976 (#76002170)	Southeast of Oakley on Burch Rd. on Canoe Neck Creek; 38°15′47″N 76°43′50″W	Oakley	Brick dwelling built by the Gardiner family in the early 18th century.
20	Sandgates On Cat Creek	Sandgates On Cat Creek	November 14, 1978 (#78003179)	East of Oakville on Maryland Route 472, ½ mile from Patuxent River; 38°24′36″N 76°36′53″W	Oakville	Frame dwelling with brick ends built between 1740 and 1780.
21	Sotterley	Sotterley	November 9, 1972 (#72001487)	East of the junction of Maryland Route 245 and Vista Rd. 38°22′47″N 76°32′20″W	Hollywood	National Trust owned property with original section of dwelling built in 1703.
22	St. Andrew's Church	St. Andrew's Church	March 14, 1973 (#73002171)	5 miles (8.0 km) east of Leonardtown on St. Andrew's Church Rd. 38°17′16″N 76°33′06″W	Leonardtown	Rectangular brick box church designed in 1766.
23	St. Clement's Island Historic District	St. Clement's Island Historic District	April 10, 1972 (#72001484)	South of Colton Point on the Potomac River; 38°27′00″N 76°45′06″W	Coltons Point	Landing site of original settlers of Maryland, 1634.
24	St. Francis Xavier Church and Newtown Manor House Historic District	St. Francis Xavier Church and Newtown Manor House Historic District	November 9, 1972 (#72001485)	South of Compton on Maryland Route 243; 38°15′20″N 76°42′01″W	Compton	Site important in the 17th century ecclesiastical history of Maryland, as an example of a self-contained Jesuit community made self-supporting by the surrounding 700-acre (2.8 km^{2}) farm.
25	St. George's Protestant Episcopal Church	St. George's Protestant Episcopal Church	October 3, 1973 (#73002173)	West of Valley Lee, off Maryland Route 249 on Maryland Route 244; 38°11′42″N 76°31′16″W	Valley Lee	Brick church built in 1799; believed to be the site of the oldest Anglican church in Maryland whose parish is still in existence.
26	St. Ignatius Roman Catholic Church	St. Ignatius Roman Catholic Church	November 3, 1975 (#75002086)	West of St. Inigoes on Villa Rd. 38°09′02″N 76°25′25″W	St. Inigoes	Brick church constructed between 1785 and 1787, with the sacristy added in 1817.
27	St. Marys City Historic District	St. Marys City Historic District	August 4, 1969 (#69000310)	Address Restricted	St. Mary's City	Site of original English settlement in Maryland, 1634; provincial capital of Maryland until 1695.
28	St. Richard's Manor		March 28, 1985 (#85000655)	Millstone Landing Rd. 38°17′45″N 76°28′12″W	Lexington Park	Brick dwelling constructed before 1750 on the Patuxent River.
29	Tudor Hall	Tudor Hall	April 26, 1973 (#73002172)	Tudor Hall Rd. 38°17′14″N 76°38′05″W	Leonardtown	Georgian brick building built about 1798; home to the St. Mary’s County Historical Society.
30	U-1105 BLACK Panther (Type VIIC German Submarine)	U-1105 BLACK Panther (Type VIIC German Submarine)	January 11, 2001 (#00001602)	Potomac River; 38°08′10″N 76°33′10″W	Piney Point	World War II German U-Boat wreck; Maryland's first historic shipwreck preserve.
31	West St. Mary's Manor	West St. Mary's Manor	April 15, 1970 (#70000854)	About 1-mile (1.6 km) east of Drayden on the St. Mary's River; 38°11′10″N 76°26′54″W	Drayden	Early Colonial-era house built between 1700 and 1730.
32	Woodlawn	Woodlawn	April 2, 1980 (#80004335)	South of St. Marys on Maryland Route 252, west of Maryland Route 5; 38°06′27″N 76°23′18″W	St. Mary's City	Federal-style, 18th century frame house.

== Former listings ==
	Name on the Register	Image	Date listed	Date removed	Location	City or town	Description
1	Resurrection Manor	Resurrection Manor	April 15, 1970 (#70000855)	February 17, 2006	45270 Daniels Rd., 4.5 mi. SE of Hollywood	Hollywood	Demolished

== See also ==
- List of National Historic Landmarks in Maryland
- National Register of Historic Places listings in Maryland
