= Maryland Route 244 =

State highway in Maryland, United States

Maryland Route 244
- Maryland Route 244 highlighted in red

Route information
- Maintained by MDSHA
- Length: 10.48 mi (16.87 km)
- Existed: 1927–present

Major junctions
- West end: MD 5 near Leonardtown
- East end: MD 249 in Valley Lee

Location
- Country: United States
- State: Maryland
- Counties: St. Mary's

Highway system
- Maryland highway system; Interstate; US; State; Scenic Byways
← MD 243	→ MD 245

Maryland Route 244 (MD 244) is a state highway in the U.S. state of Maryland. Known for most of its length as Medleys Neck Road, the state highway runs 10.48 miles (16.87 km) from MD 5 near Leonardtown south to MD 249 in Valley Lee. MD 244 parallels MD 5 in central St. Mary's County, serving several communities on Medleys Neck between Breton Bay and the St. Mary's River, including Beauvue. The state highway was constructed as part of three different state highways—MD 244 from Leonardtown, MD 250 from Valley Lee, and MD 251 through Drayden—between the late 1920s and late 1930s. MD 244 assumed the courses of MD 250 and MD 251 in the mid-1940s. The portion of MD 244 east of MD 249 was removed from the state highway system in the mid-1980s.

== Route description ==
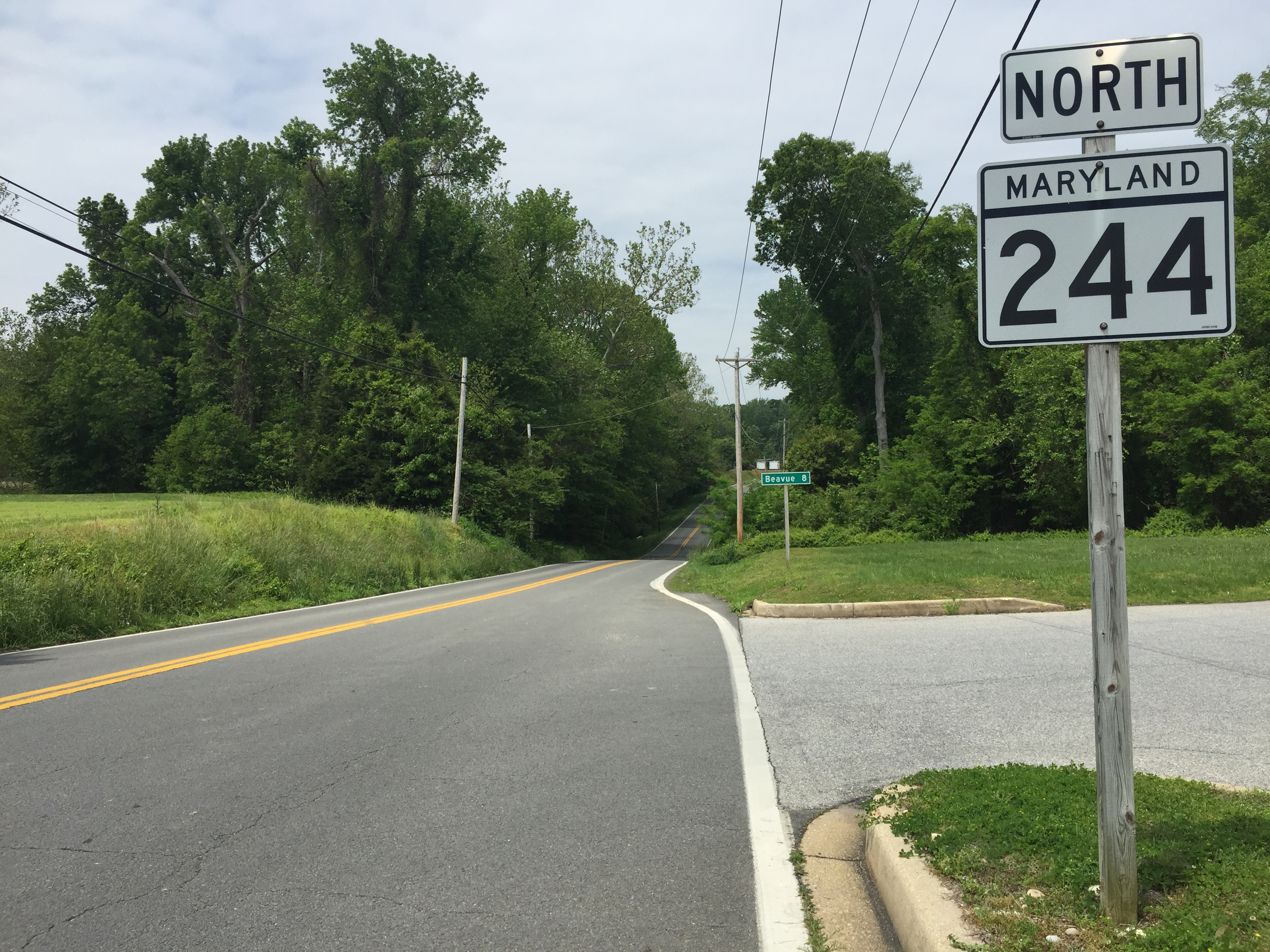
View north from the south end of MD 244 at MD 249 near Valley Lee

MD 244 begins at an intersection with MD 5 north of Leonardtown High School and Leonardtown Middle School and west of the St. Mary's County Fairgrounds. The state highway heads south from the Leonardtown area as two-lane undivided Medleys Neck Road through a forested area. After crossing Moldier Run, MD 244 passes by Foxes Point Lane, which leads to the Indian Village Archaeological Park. In the hamlet of Beauvue, the state highway intersects Breton Beach Road, which leads to a series of small beach resorts on Breton Bay and the Potomac River. MD 244 curves to the southeast and passes White Beach Beach Road, which leads to the namesake community. The state highway continues east, crossing Poplar Hill Creek before passing Mulberry Fields Road, which serves the namesake historic home. At Chingville Road, MD 244 curves to the south toward Valley Lee. In Valley Lee, the state highway turns east onto Blake Creek Road. MD 244 passes St. George's Episcopal Church before reaching its eastern terminus at MD 249 (Piney Point Road). A former section of MD 244, Drayden Road, heads east from MD 249 a short distance south of the MD 244 intersection. The county highway heads east toward the hamlet of Drayden and the historic homes Porto Bello and West St. Mary's Manor on the St. Mary's River.

== History ==
Maryland Route 250
- Location: Valley Lee
- Existed: 1927–c. 1946

Maryland Route 251
- Location: Valley Lee–Drayden
- Existed: 1928–c. 1946

MD 244 was constructed as part of three highways: MD 244 from the Leonardtown end, MD 250 from the Valley Lee end, and MD 251 along Drayden Road. MD 244 was constructed from MD 5 to Beauvue in 1925 and 1926. The state highway was extended east in 1-mile (1.6 km) segments in 1930, 1933, and 1934. MD 244 was completed to near Chingville Road in 1939. The first section of MD 250 was Blake Creek Road from MD 249 to the present right-angle turn onto Medleys Neck Road. MD 250 was extended to near Chingville Road in two sections beginning in 1930 and completed in 1935. MD 251 was constructed from MD 249 east to Cherryfield Road in Drayden in 1928 and east to Porto Bello in 1930. The gap between MD 244 and MD 250 centered on Chingville Road was closed with the construction of 1.6 miles (2.6 km) of connecting highway around 1942. By 1946, MD 244 was extended east over the lengths of MD 250 and MD 251. MD 244 was reduced to its current length when the Drayden Road portion of the state highway was transferred to county maintenance around 1987.

== Junction list ==
The entire route is in St. Mary's County.

Location	mi	km	Destinations	Notes
Leonardtown	0.00	0.00	MD 5 (Point Lookout Road) – Leonardtown, St. Mary's City	Western terminus
Valley Lee	10.48	16.87	MD 249 (Piney Point Road) – St. George Island, Callaway	Eastern terminus
1.000 mi = 1.609 km; 1.000 km = 0.621 mi
