= Maryland Route 249 =

State highway in Maryland, United States

Maryland Route 249
- Piney Point Road
- Maryland Route 249 highlighted in red

Route information
- Maintained by MDSHA
- Length: 9.84 mi (15.84 km)
- Existed: 1927–present
- Tourist routes: Religious Freedom Byway

Major junctions
- South end: Piney Point Road in St. George Island
- MD 244 at Valley Lee
- North end: MD 5 at Callaway

Location
- Country: United States
- State: Maryland
- Counties: St. Mary's

Highway system
- Maryland highway system; Interstate; US; State; Scenic Byways
← MD 247	→ MD 250

Maryland Route 249 (MD 249) is a state highway in the U.S. state of Maryland. Known as Piney Point Road, the state highway runs 9.84 miles (15.84 km) from St. George Island north to MD 5 in Callaway. MD 249 is the primary access to St. George Island and the communities of Piney Point, Tall Timbers, and Valley Lee on the Piney Point peninsula between the Potomac River and St. George's Creek in southern St. Mary's County. The state highway was constructed on the mainland in the early 1920s; the portion of the highway on St. George Island was completed in the early 1930s. MD 249 was reconstructed in the 1950s, including a new St. George Island Bridge.

== Route description ==
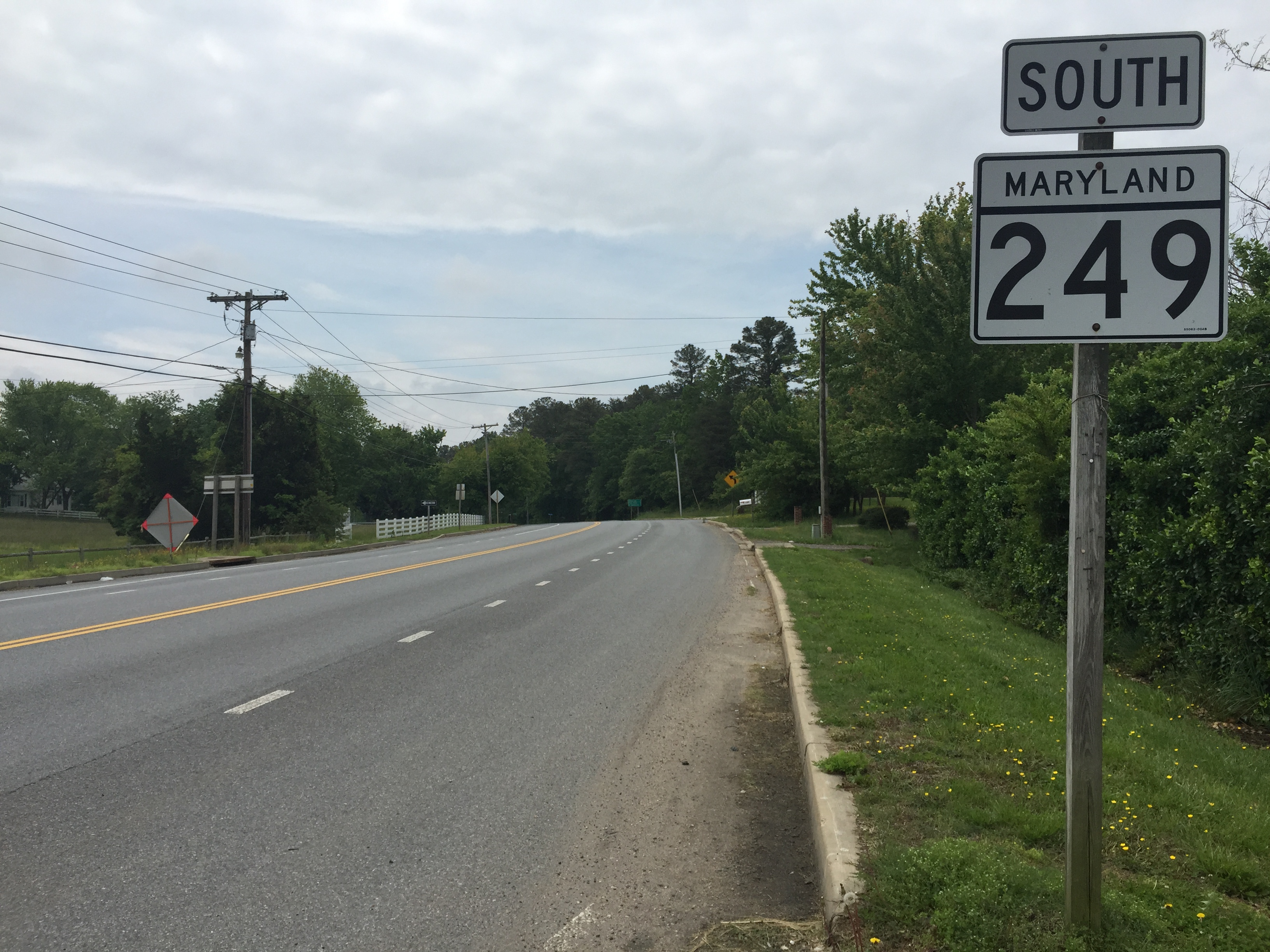
View south from the north end of MD 249 at MD 5 in Callaway

MD 249 begins 0.20 miles (0.32 km) south of the state highway's intersection with Sheaffer Road on St. George Island. Piney Point Road continues as a county highway toward the southern end of the island. Just north of its terminus, MD 249 is a two-lane undivided road and begins to closely parallel a riprap along the Potomac River side of the island. The state highway passes along a narrow point of the island where St. George's Creek briefly parallels the northbound side of the highway. MD 249 temporarily leaves the immediate coastline before crossing over a strait between St. George's Creek and the Potomac River on the St. George Island Bridge.

Now on the mainland, MD 249 continues through the community of Piney Point, where the highway passes the entrance to the Paul Hall Center for Maritime Training and Education and Lighthouse Road. Lighthouse Road, which was formerly MD 498, leads to the Piney Point Lighthouse and the wreckage of German submarine U-1105 on the bottom of the Potomac River. MD 249 continues northwest, passing to the east of the former Piney Point Airport and the property of NuStar Energy. The NuStar Energy property had previously been owned by Steuart Petroleum, which had taken over the land from the U.S. Navy, which operated the Piney Point Torpedo Testing Station during World War II. The state highway curves to the northeast at the community of Tall Timbers, where the highway passes the old alignment now followed by Old Tall Timbers Road and Tall Timbers Road. MD 249 passes between the head of St. George's Creek and Tall Timbers Cove, then curves to the north through the community of Valley Lee. In Valley Lee, the state highway passes a former section of MD 244, Drayden Road, and the extant part of MD 244, Blake Creek Road. MD 249 continues north through a mix of forest and farmland to its northern terminus at MD 5 (Point Lookout Road) in Callaway.

== History ==
MD 249 was constructed as a gravel road from Callaway to Lighthouse Road in Piney Point around 1923. The state highway was extended south to the narrow, wooden bridge to St. George Island in 1924. By 1927, a short section of road was completed on the island. MD 249 was extended south to its present terminus in two sections completed in 1930 and 1933. A timber bulkhead was constructed along the portion of the state highway adjacent to the Potomac River in 1938 and 1939. The St. George Island Bridge was raised on request of the U.S. Navy in 1942. MD 249 was reconstructed and widened in the 1950s, starting with the highway from Callaway to Valley Lee being paved in bituminous stabilized gravel in 1950 and 1951. The remainder of the state highway to St. George Island was paved and widened in 1958 and 1959. That project included relocations at Tall Timbers and a new St. George Island Bridge, which was completed in 1957.

== Junction list ==
The entire route is in St. Mary's County.

Location	mi	km	Destinations	Notes
St. George Island	0.00	0.00	Piney Point Road south	Southern terminus
Piney Point	1.49– 1.57	2.40– 2.53	St. George Island Bridge	
Valley Lee	6.65	10.70	MD 244 north (Blake Creek Road) – Beauvue	Southern terminus of MD 244
Callaway	9.84	15.84	MD 5 (Point Lookout Road) – Leonardtown, St. Mary's City	Northern terminus
1.000 mi = 1.609 km; 1.000 km = 0.621 mi
