= Dameron (disambiguation) =

Dameron is a variety of French red wine grape. The term may also refer to:

- Dameron (surname) or Damron, a surname of French and Belgian origin:
- Dameron, Maryland, a location in the United States
- Dameron, West Virginia
- Dameron, the main antagonist of the video game Myth: History in the Making
- Poe Dameron, a commander and X-wing pilot in the resistance in the Star Wars sequel trilogy
