= Abell House =

Abell House or Abell Farmhouse or Abell Barn may refer to:

- Abell House (Middletown, Kentucky), listed on the NRHP in Jefferson County, Kentucky
- Abell House (Leonardtown, Maryland), in Maryland
- Abell Farmhouse and Barn, in New York
- Robert Abell Round Barn, in North Dakota
- Abell-Gleason House, in Charlottesville, Virginia
- Abell-Kilbourn House, Martinsburg, West Virginia
