= William P. Duvall =

U.S. Army major general

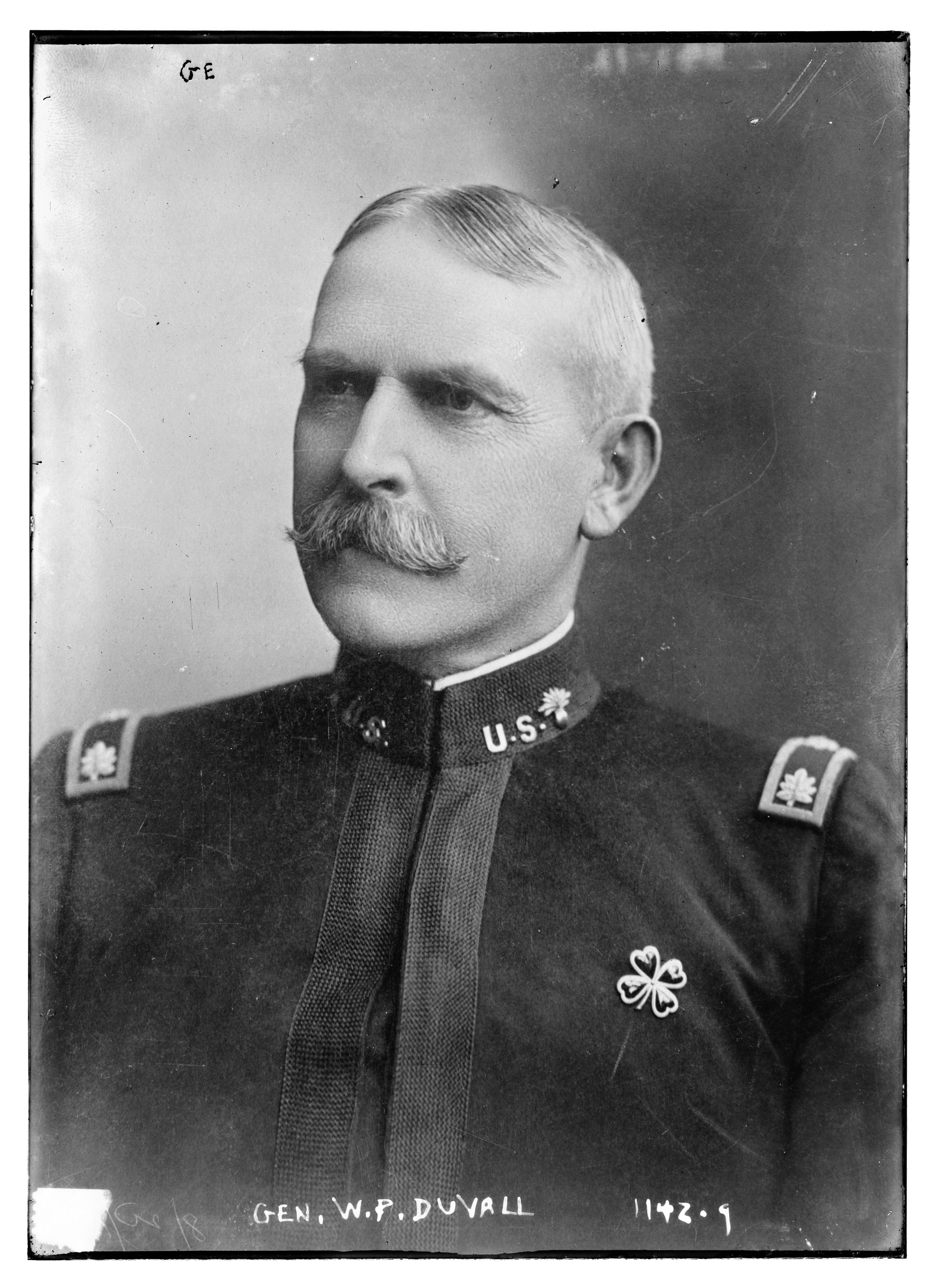
- Bain News Service photo, c. 1899
- Born: January 13, 1847; St. George Island, Maryland, U.S.
- Died: March 1, 1920 (aged 73); Coronado, California, U.S.
- Burial place: West Point Cemetery, West Point, New York, U.S.
- Spouse(s): Rose Greenhow (m. 1871–1899, div.); Maria Cumming Lamar (m. 1902–1920, his death)
- Children: 2
- Relatives: Rose O'Neal Greenhow (mother-in-law)
- Military career
- Service: United States Army
- Service years: 1869–1911; 1917–1918
- Rank: Major General
- Unit: U.S. Army Field Artillery Branch
- Commands: Southeastern Department; Philippine Division; Department of the Gulf; 48th United States Volunteer Infantry; 26th United States Volunteer Infantry; Chief of Ordnance, Second Army Corps
- Wars: Spanish–American War; Philippine–American War; World War I

William P. Duvall (Note: Duvall's last name is sometimes spelled "Duval".) (January 13, 1847 – March 1, 1920) was a career officer in the United States Army. A veteran of the Spanish–American War and Philippine–American War, he served from 1869 to 1911, commanded units including the Philippine Division, and attained the rank of major general.

A native of St. George Island, Maryland, Duvall attended the schools of St. Mary's County, Maryland before receiving appointment to the United States Military Academy (West Point) in 1865. He graduated in 1869 and was commissioned as a second lieutenant of Field Artillery. He served initially in coastal artillery assignments at posts including Fort Adams, Rhode Island and Fort Monroe, Virginia. He also served on the faculty at West Point and the Pennsylvania Military Academy. He was promoted to first lieutenant in 1877 and captain in 1898.

During the Spanish–American War, Duvall was promoted to temporary major and lieutenant colonel, and served in staff and command assignments including chief of Ordnance for Second Army Corps. Promoted to colonel in 1899, Duvall commanded the 26th United States Volunteer Infantry and 48th United States Volunteer Infantry during the Philippine–American War. Promoted to brigadier general in 1906 and major general in 1907, Duvall commanded the Department of the Gulf and the Philippine Division before retiring in 1911.

Duvall was one of several retired officers recalled to active duty for World War I; despite being over 70 years old, he commanded the army's Southeastern Department from August 1917 to January 1918, when he retired again. He died in Coronado, California on March 1, 1920, and was buried at West Point Cemetery.

== Early life ==
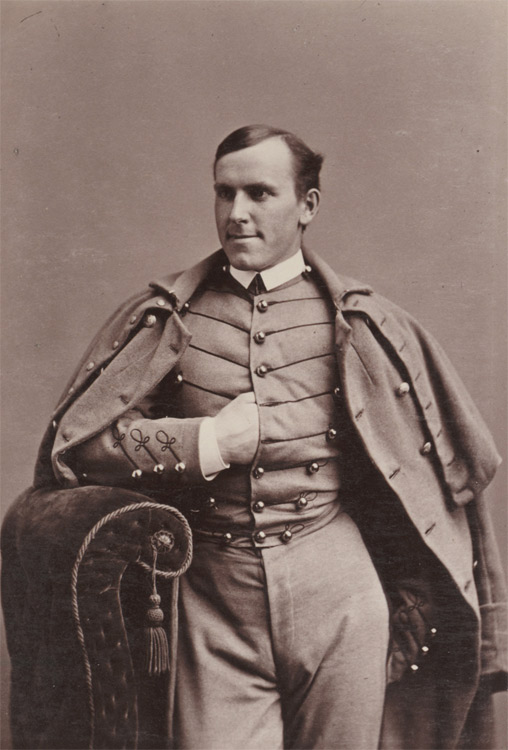
Duvall as a West Point Cadet, circa 1869

William Penn Duvall was born on St. George Island in St. Mary's County, Maryland on January 13, 1847, the son of Robert Emmett Duvall and Julia (Frame) Duvall. Robert Duvall was a Union Army veteran of the American Civil War and served as a captain in the Cavalry regiment commanded by William Henry Purnell.

The younger Duvall was educated in the schools of St. Mary's County. In 1864, Edwin Hanson Webster, a United States Representative from Maryland, recommended Duvall for appointment to the United States Military Academy. He began attendance in 1865 and graduated in 1869 ranked 7th of 39. At graduation, Duvall was appointed a second lieutenant of Field Artillery.

Among his classmates who also served as general officers were Earl Dennison Thomas, Samuel Escue Tillman, Charles Morton, and William W. Robinson Jr. Among his prominent classmates who did not attain general's rank were Eric Bergland, Arthur Sherburne Hardy, John Gregory Bourke, and James Ezekiel Porter.

== Start of career ==
After receiving his commission, Duvall was assigned to the 5th Artillery Regiment, and he served at coastal artillery posts including Fort Adams, Rhode Island from 1869 to 1872 and Fort Monroe, Virginia in the summer of 1872. From 1872 to 1875, he served on the faculty at West Point as an assistant professor of mathematics. In addition, he served as an instructor of Artillery tactics, then as an instructor of Infantry tactics. From 1875 to 1877, Duvall acted as West Point's acting commissary of subsistence. He was promoted to first lieutenant in April 1877.

Duvall served with his regiment in Atlanta, Georgia from April 1877 to April 1880. After serving again at Fort Monroe from April 1880 to July 1881, he was assigned as professor of military science at the Pennsylvania Military Academy, where he remained until July 1884. From July 1884 to September 1889, Duvall performed special duty in the office of the Adjutant General of the United States Army, first as disbursing officer for the World Cotton Centennial in New Orleans, the Centenniel Exposition in Cincinnati, and the Southern Exposition in Louisville, then as recorder for the Army board that reviewed and acted on claims for lost and damaged property in Kansas during the American Civil War.

From September 1889 to March 1898, Duvall served in artillery assignments at Fort Schuyler, New York and Fort Monroe, Virginia. He was promoted to captain in the 1st Artillery in March 1898.

== Continued career ==
In May 1898, Duvall was promoted to temporary major in the United States Volunteers for the Spanish–American War and assigned to the staff in the office of the United States Secretary of War. In June he was assigned as chief Ordnance officer for the Second Army Corps. In July 1898, he was promoted to temporary lieutenant colonel. In addition to serving as chief of Ordnance, Duvall was the acting Judge Advocate for the Second Army Corps from October 1898 to May 1899.

In July 1899, Duvall was assigned to command the 26th U. S. Volunteer Infantry, and in September 1899 he was promoted to temporary colonel as commander of the 48th U. S. Volunteer Infantry. Duvall commanded his regiment in the Philippines during the Philippine–American War, including service at La Loma, La Union, and Benguet. He returned to the United States in June 1901 and reverted to his permanent rank of captain.

Duvall served in coastal artillery assignments at Fort Wadsworth, New York, Fort Howard, Maryland, Fort Columbus, New York, and Fort Williams, Maine from July 1901 to September 1903, and he was promoted to permanent major in September 1901. From August 1903 to December 1905, Duvall served on the War Department General Staff. From December 1905 to March 1906, he served as principal assistant to the Chief of Artillery. He was promoted to lieutenant colonel in February 1906, and brigadier general in March 1906.

== Later career ==
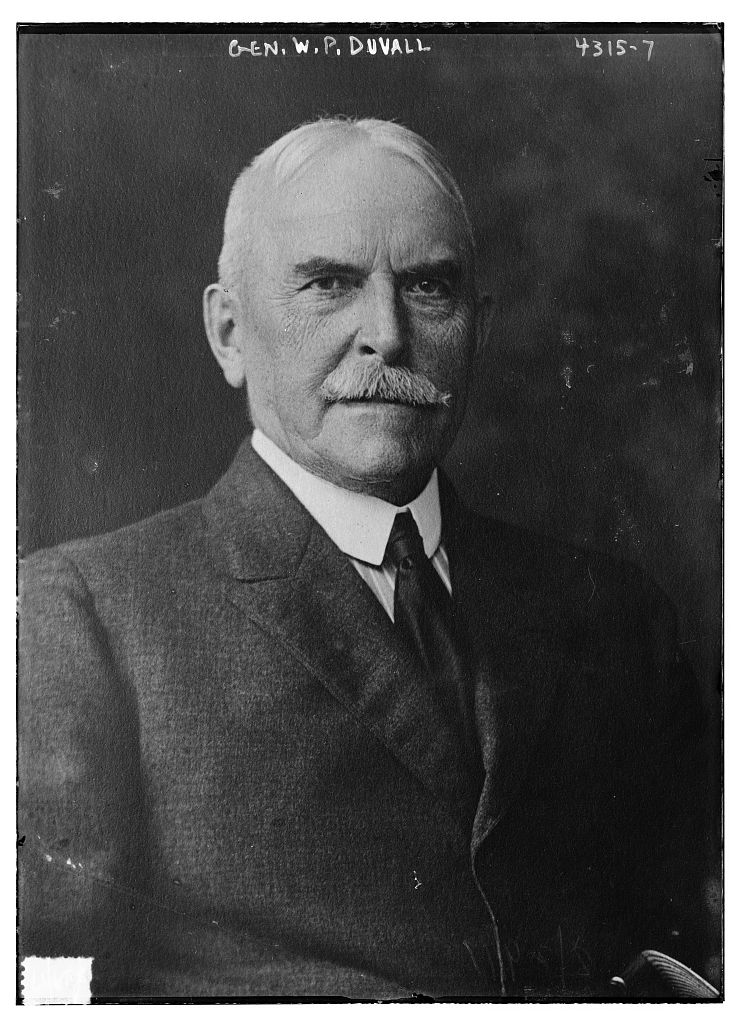
Duvall circa 1915. Library of Congress photo.

After his promotion to brigadier general, Duvall commanded the Department of the Gulf from April 1906 to February 1907. From July to October 1906, he performed detached duty as an observer during maneuvers of the Imperial German Army. From February 1907 to February 1909, Duvall was assigned as assistant to the Army Chief of Staff. In October 1907, he was promoted to major general. From April 1909 to December 1910, he commanded the Philippine Division. Duvall was on a leave of absence in China from December 1910 to January 1911, when he attained the mandatory retirement age of 64.

In retirement, he took up residence in the Sand Hills neighborhood of Augusta, Georgia. After his retirement from the military, Duvall traveled the world, including time in Burma, India, the Malay States, Java, China, Italy, Germany and France.

In August 1917, Duvall was one of several retired officers who were recalled to active duty for World War I. Assigned to command the army's Southeastern Department despite being over 70 years old, Duvall served at its Charleston, South Carolina headquarters until January 1918, when he retired for the second time.

== Death and burial ==
Duvall died at his home in Coronado, California on March 1, 1920. He was buried at West Point Cemetery in West Point, New York.

== Legacy ==
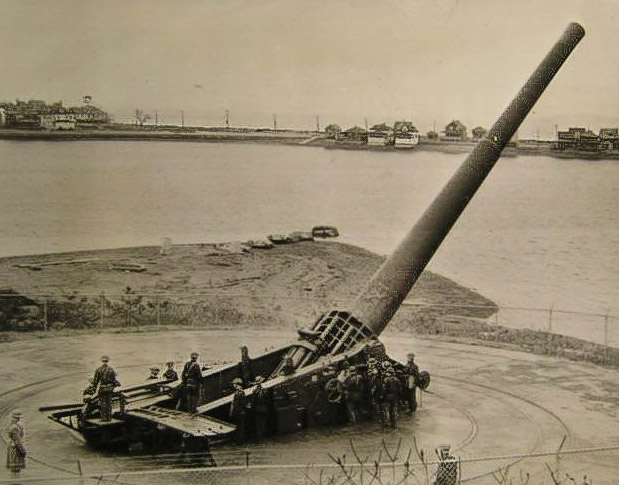
16-inch gun emplacement at Fort Duvall, Massachusetts, 1919

Fort Duvall, a Coast Artillery post that was part of the Harbor Defenses of Boston, was in operation from 1917 to 1974. In 1922, the post was named for Duvall.

== Family ==
In November 1871, Duvall married Rose Greenhow, the daughter of Rose O'Neal Greenhow, in Newport, Rhode Island. They were the parents of a son, William, who died in 1874, and daughter, Lee (1872–1939). Lee later took the name Mary, and was the wife of Louis Eugene Marié, an architect and United States Navy veteran of the Spanish–American War.

William Duvall and Rose Greenhow divorced in 1899. In 1902 he married Maria Cumming Lamar (1869–1957).
