= Maryland Route 472 =

State highway in Maryland, United States

Maryland Route 472
- North Sandgates Road
- Maryland Route 472 highlighted in red

Route information
- Maintained by MDSHA
- Length: 2.58 mi (4.15 km)
- Existed: 1933–present

Major junctions
- South end: MD 235 in Oakville
- North end: South Sandgates Road in Sandgates

Location
- Country: United States
- State: Maryland
- Counties: St. Mary's

Highway system
- Maryland highway system; Interstate; US; State; Scenic Byways
← MD 471	→ MD 478

Maryland Route 472 (MD 472) is a state highway in the U.S. state of Maryland. Known as North Sandgates Road, the state highway runs 2.58 miles (4.15 km) from MD 235 in Oakville north to Sandgates Creek in Sandgates in St. Mary's County. MD 472 was built in 1933.

== Route description ==
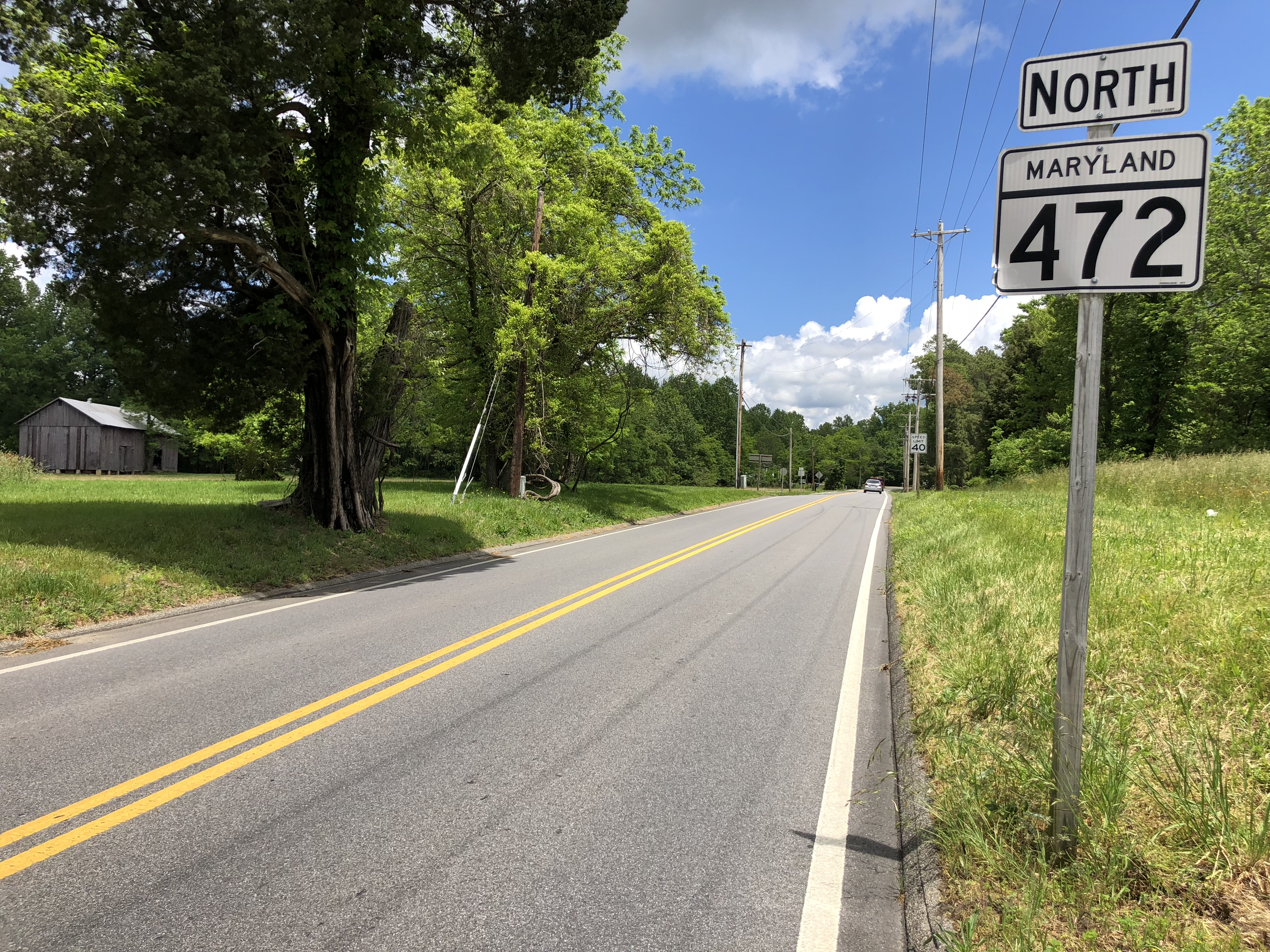
View north from the south end of MD 472 at MD 235 in Oakville

MD 472 begins at an intersection with MD 235 (Three Notch Road) in Oakville. The state highway heads northeast as a two-lane undivided road through farmland and forest with scattered residences. After passing west of the historic home Sandgates On Cat Creek, MD 472 enters the beach community of Sandgates on the Patuxent River. The state highway reaches its northern terminus at the west end of the county-maintained wooden-floored bridge over Sandgates Creek. The roadway continues south as South Sandgates Road, a county highway that connects back with MD 235 in Hillville.

== History ==
MD 472 was constructed in 1933. Aside from repaving, the state highway has changed very little since then.

== Junction list ==
The entire route is in St. Mary's County.

Location	mi	km	Destinations	Notes
Oakville	0.00	0.00	MD 235 (Three Notch Road) – Waldorf, Lexington Park	Southern terminus
Sandgates	2.58	4.15	South Sandgates Road	Northern terminus; terminus at west end of bridge over Sandgates Creek
1.000 mi = 1.609 km; 1.000 km = 0.621 mi
