= Richard Thomas (Zarvona) =

Richard Thomas Zarvona
- Born: Richard Thomas, Jr. October 27, 1833
- Died: March 17, 1875 (aged 41)
- Burial place: Deep Falls, Chaptico, Maryland
- Relatives: Gov. James Thomas (uncle)
- Military career
- Allegiance: (Second French Empire) France and/or Kingdom of Sardinia; Confederate States of America
- Branch: (Second French Empire) French and/or (Kingdom of Sardinia) Sardinian Army; Confederate States Army
- Service years: 1861–63 (CSA)
- Rank: Colonel (CSA)
- Nickname: The French Lady
- Unit: 47th Virginia Infantry
- Commands: CSS St. Nicholas
- Conflicts: Second Italian War of Independence; American Civil War

Richard Thomas Zarvona (October 27, 1833 – March 17, 1875), born Richard Thomas Jr., was an American adventurer, soldier, and a Confederate Army officer who became known as "the French lady" after he disguised himself as a woman to seize a passenger steamer during the American Civil War.

== Early life ==
The eldest son of former Maryland House of Delegates speaker Richard Thomas Sr. and the nephew of Maryland governor James Thomas, Richard Thomas Jr. was born and raised in "Mattapany," the Thomas family plantation south of the Patuxent River. An accomplished athlete and sportsman, Thomas attended Charlotte Hall Military Academy and another military school in nearby Talbot County, Maryland, before receiving appointment to the U.S. Military Academy at West Point, New York in 1850. Thomas survived his plebe year with 189 demerits, but resigned in October 1851.

He then traveled the world, serving in the Second Italian War of Independence. He served either in the Sardinian or in the French Army, no written proof for which one available; though his new proficiency of the French language (coupled with a lack of Italian) and a deep interest in Zouaves strongly favour the latter. It was then that he added "Zarvona" to his name; family legend establishing a French love who died and whose name he took. He returned to America in early 1861.

== Civil War ==
In April 1861 Zarvona formulated his idea to support the Confederacy by either becoming an engineer officer or by going to the sea. A month later he formed a command of Zouaves that eventually would become Company H of the 47th Virginia Infantry Regiment. Simultaneously he started to plan the takeover of a ship; a plan that, with support of the government of Virginia, started on June 28. A disguised Thomas and a crew of accomplices seized the Bostoner passenger steamer St. Nicholas, planning to use it to raid the sloop of war USS Pawnee.
