= Woodlawn (St. Marys, Maryland) =

Historic house in Maryland, United States

- U.S. National Register of Historic Places
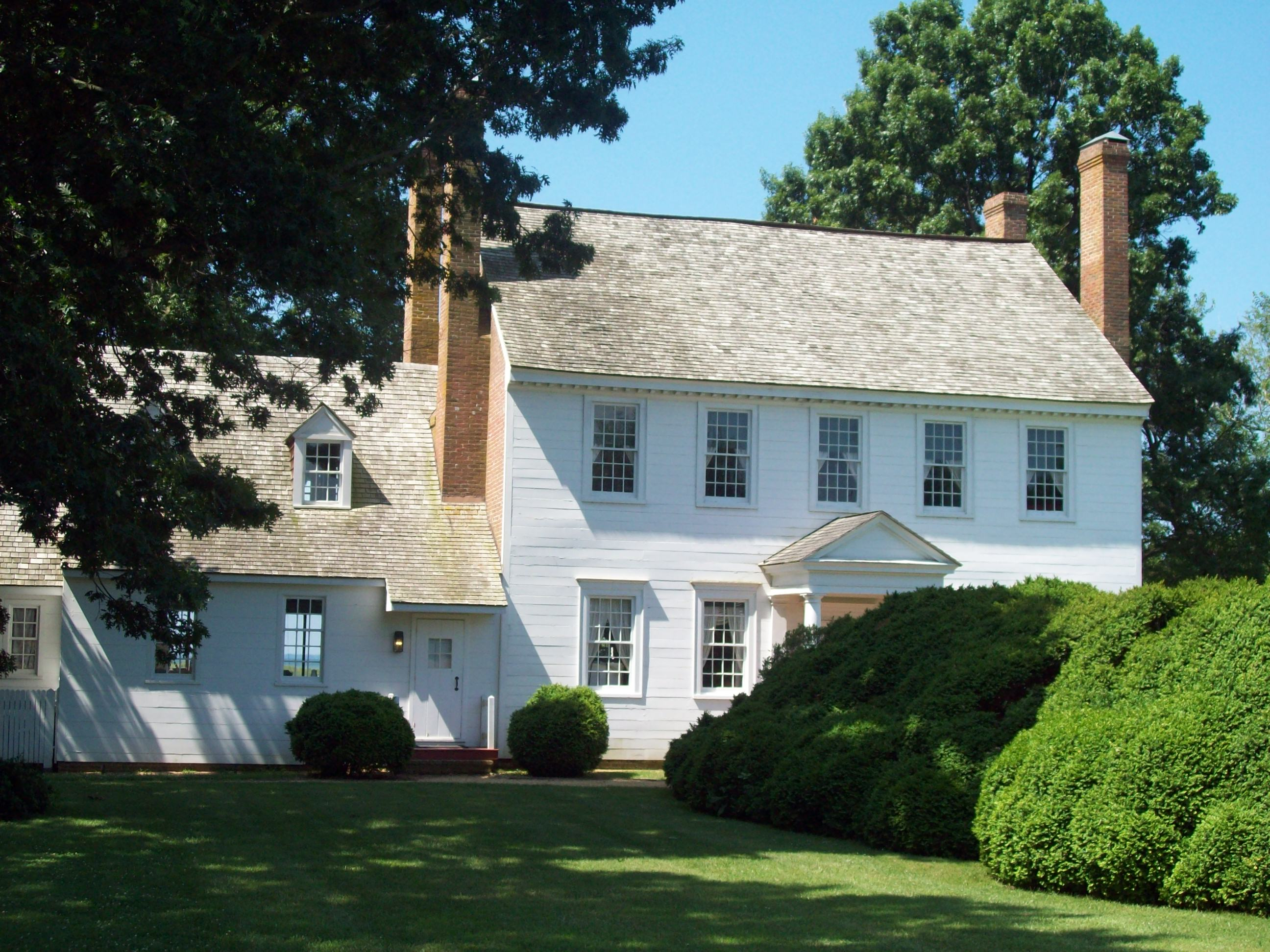
- Woodlawn, July 2009

- Location within Maryland Location within the United States
- Location: S of St. Marys on MD 252, W of MD Rt. 5, St. Mary's City, Maryland
- Coordinates: 38°6′27″N 76°23′18″W
- Architectural style: Federal
- NRHP reference No.: 80004335
- Added to NRHP: April 02, 1980

Woodlawn is a historic home located at St. Mary's City, St. Mary's County, Maryland, United States. It is a Federal-style, two-story, five-bay frame house with brick ends, which is two rooms deep and has a gable roof. Each brick end contains a large double exterior chimney. The house is a large and fully developed Federal period house exhibiting one of the most important characteristics of Southern Maryland's 18th-century architecture: brick ends with frame facades. It is operated as a bed and breakfast.

Woodlawn was listed on the National Register of Historic Places in 1980.
