= 47th Virginia Infantry Regiment =

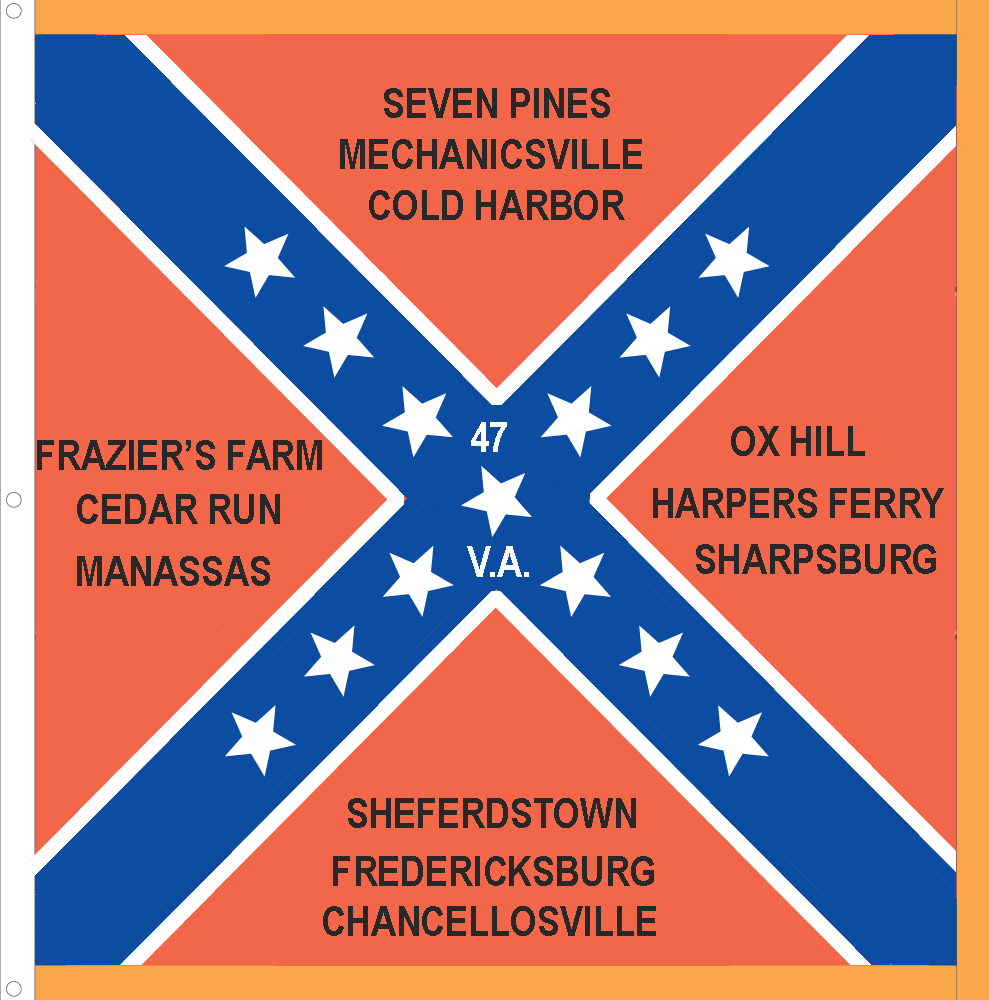
- regimental battle flag
- Active: June 1861 – April 1865
- Disbanded: April 1865
- Country: Confederacy
- Allegiance: Confederate States of America
- Branch: Confederate States Army
- Type: Infantry
- Engagements: American Civil War: Peninsula Campaign; Seven Days' Battles; Second Battle of Manassas; Battle of Sharpsburg; Battle of Fredericksburg; Battle of Chancellorsville; Battle of Gettysburg; Battle of Cold Harbor; Siege of Petersburg; Appomattox Campaign

Commanders
- Notable commanders: Col. Robert M. Mayo
- Notable members: Col. Richard T. Zarvona

The 47th Virginia Infantry Regiment was an infantry regiment raised in Virginia for service in the Confederate States Army during the American Civil War. It fought mostly with the Army of Northern Virginia and was a unit in A.P. Hill's Light Division.

Major Charles Jones Green of Co. A, 47th Virginia Infantry Regiment

The 47th Virginia was formed in June 1861, with men recruited in Caroline, Middlesex, Essex, King George, and Stafford counties. One company, Company H, was recruited in Maryland and known as Zarvona's Zouaves. The unit served under the command of Generals Pettigrew, Field, Heth, H.H. Walker, and Barton.

It fought with the Army of Northern Virginia from Seven Pines to Cold Harbor, then was active in the trenches of Petersburg and around Appomattox. This regiment totalled 444 effectives in April, 1862, and sustained 34 casualties of the 156 engaged at Frayser's Farm. It reported 29 casualties at Second Manassas, 45 at Fredericksburg, and 45 at Chancellorsville. Twenty-three percent of the 209 in action at Gettysburg were disabled.

During February 1865, the 47th and 55th Regiments were consolidated, but only 2 sergeants of the 47th surrendered on April 9.

The field officers were Colonels George W. Richardson and Robert M. Mayo; Lieutenant Colonels William J. Greene, John W. Lyell and James D. Bruce; and Majors Edward P. Tayloe and Charles J. Green.

== See also ==
- List of Virginia Civil War units
