= Point No Point Light (Maryland) =

Lighthouse in Maryland, United States

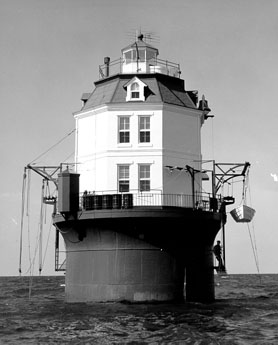
- Undated photograph of Point No Point Light, Maryland (USCG)
- Location: off west shore of the Chesapeake Bay, Maryland north of the mouth of the Potomac River
- Coordinates: 38.128°N 76.29°W

Tower
- Constructed: 1905
- Foundation: Pneumatic caisson
- Construction: Brick
- Automated: 1938, but remained staffed until 1962
- Height: 12 m (39 ft)
- Shape: Octagonal
- Heritage: National Register of Historic Places listed place
- Fog signal: Horn, 1 every 30 sec

Light
- First lit: 1905
- Focal height: 52 ft (16 m)
- Lens: original: fourth order Fresnel lens current: 14.8 inches (375 mm)
- Range: 9 nautical miles (17 km; 10 mi)
- Characteristic: Flashing white 6 sec
- Point No Point Light Station
- U.S. National Register of Historic Places
- Nearest city: Dameron, Maryland
- Area: less than one acre
- Built by: Toomey Brothers, New York
- MPS: Light Stations of the United States MPS
- NRHP reference No.: 02001425
- Added to NRHP: December 2, 2002

Point No Point Light, located in the Chesapeake Bay off the eponymous point several miles north of the mouth of the Potomac River, was constructed as part of a program to add lighted navigational aids in a thirty-mile stretch of the bay between Cove and Smith Points.

== History ==
The first request for funds to construct this light came in 1891; funds were not appropriated, however, until 1901. Due to the exposed location a pneumatic caisson base was used. This was constructed in 1902 and towed to the site in April 1903, when it was secured to a temporary pier. As with construction of Baltimore Light, a series of mishaps followed. First, the temporary pier collapsed, breaking off two courses of iron plates from the caisson and releasing it from its mooring. The caisson was retrieved and repaired, and in October of that year was set in place. However, in February 1904 the temporary pier was again destroyed, this time by moving ice. The caisson survived without damage, and the light was first shown on April 24, 1905.

Although the light was automated in 1938, it continued to be staffed until 1962. Renovations were carried out in 1989–2001 in order to arrest deterioration of the now-unoccupied structure. In 2006, like other Maryland lights, it was made available to non-profits or government agencies who would be willing to take over maintenance, and in 2007 the offer was extended to individuals. Public auction of the light was cancelled in February 2008, however, "due to safety requirements of the U.S. Navy."
