= Porto Bello (Drayden, Maryland) =

Historic house in Maryland, United States

- U.S. National Register of Historic Places
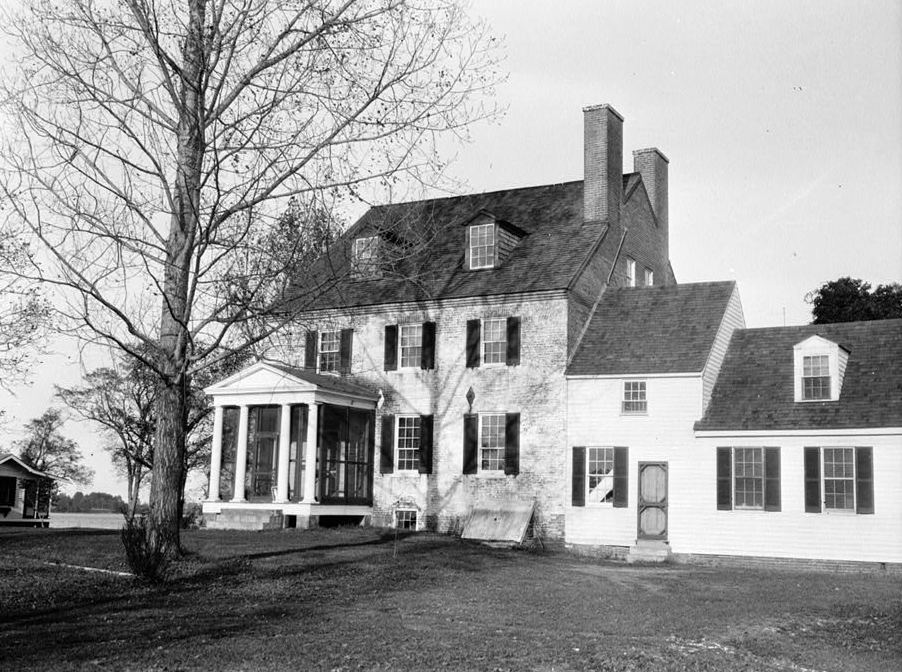
- HABS photograph of Porto Bello

- Location within Maryland Location within the United States
- Location: MD 244 E of Drayden, Drayden, Maryland
- Coordinates: 38°10′26″N 76°27′7″W
- NRHP reference No.: 72001486
- Added to NRHP: April 26, 1972

Porto Bello is a historic home located at Drayden, St. Mary's County, Maryland. It is a 1 1/2-story gambrel-roofed Flemish bond brick house built after 1742. It is located on a portion of the first grant of land recorded in the province of Maryland: West St. Mary's Manor, one of the nine original Maryland Manors. Its name commemorates the Battle of Porto Bello (1739).

The house was listed on the National Register of Historic Places in 1972.
