= Deep Falls =

Historic house in Maryland, United States

- U.S. National Register of Historic Places
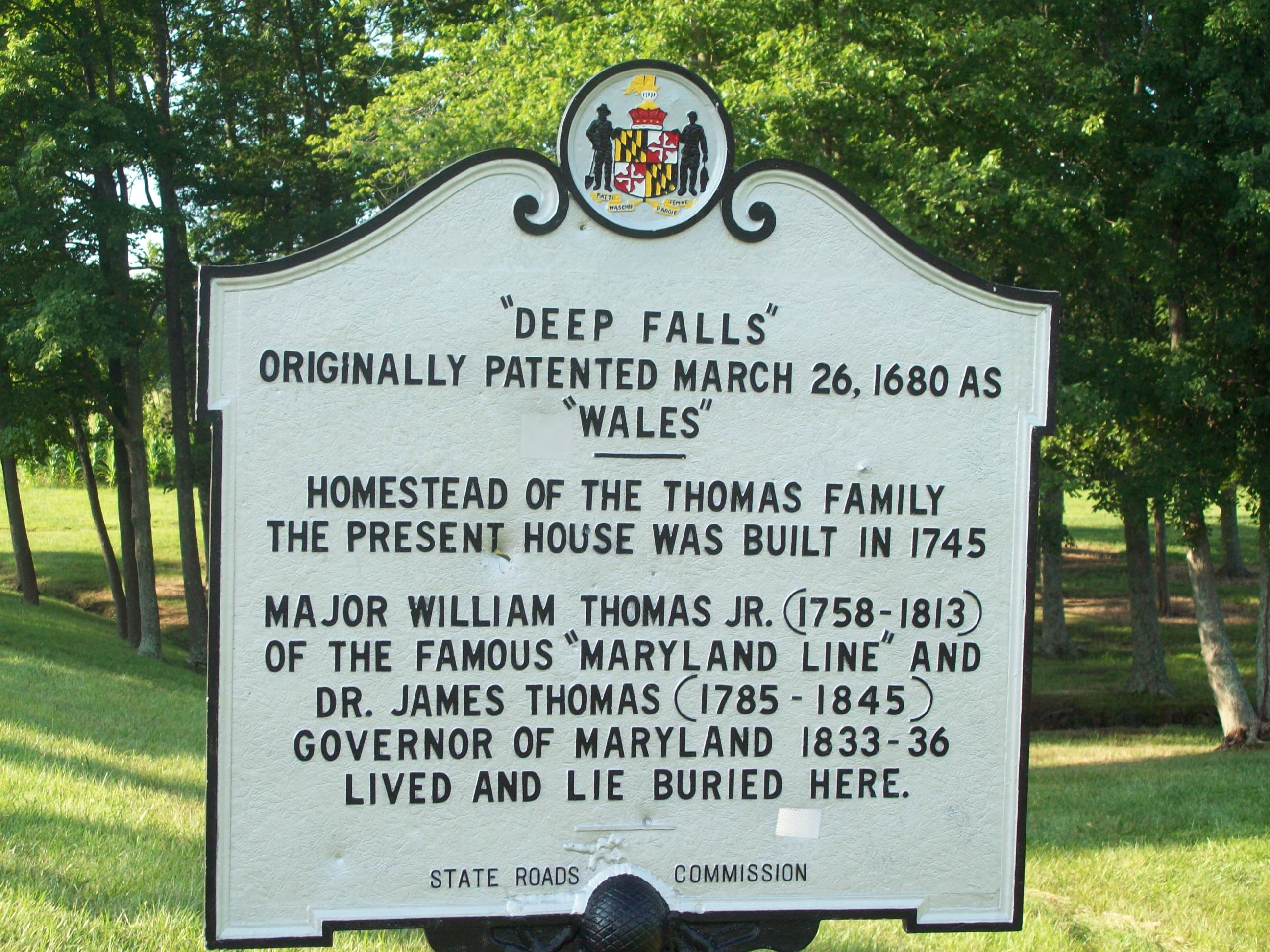
- Deep Falls, Historical Marker, July 2009

- Location within Maryland Location within the United States
- Nearest city: Chaptico, Maryland
- Coordinates: 38°21′29″N 76°45′27″W
- Built: c. 1745
- Architect: Major William Thomas
- NRHP reference No.: 75002084
- Added to NRHP: May 12, 1975

Deep Falls is a historic home located at Chaptico, St. Mary's County, Maryland, United States. It began as a one-story four-room frame house that was reportedly built in 1745. The house was apparently extensively remodeled at some time during the last two decades of the 18th century then again during the mid 19th century. Deep Falls has always been in the ownership of the Thomas family, descendants of Governor James Thomas of Maryland and the famous Civil War spy Richard Thomas (Zarvona). The family is still in ownership of the property today.

Deep Falls was listed on the National Register of Historic Places in 1975.
