= Ridge, Maryland =

Unincorporated community in Maryland, United States

- Unincorporated community
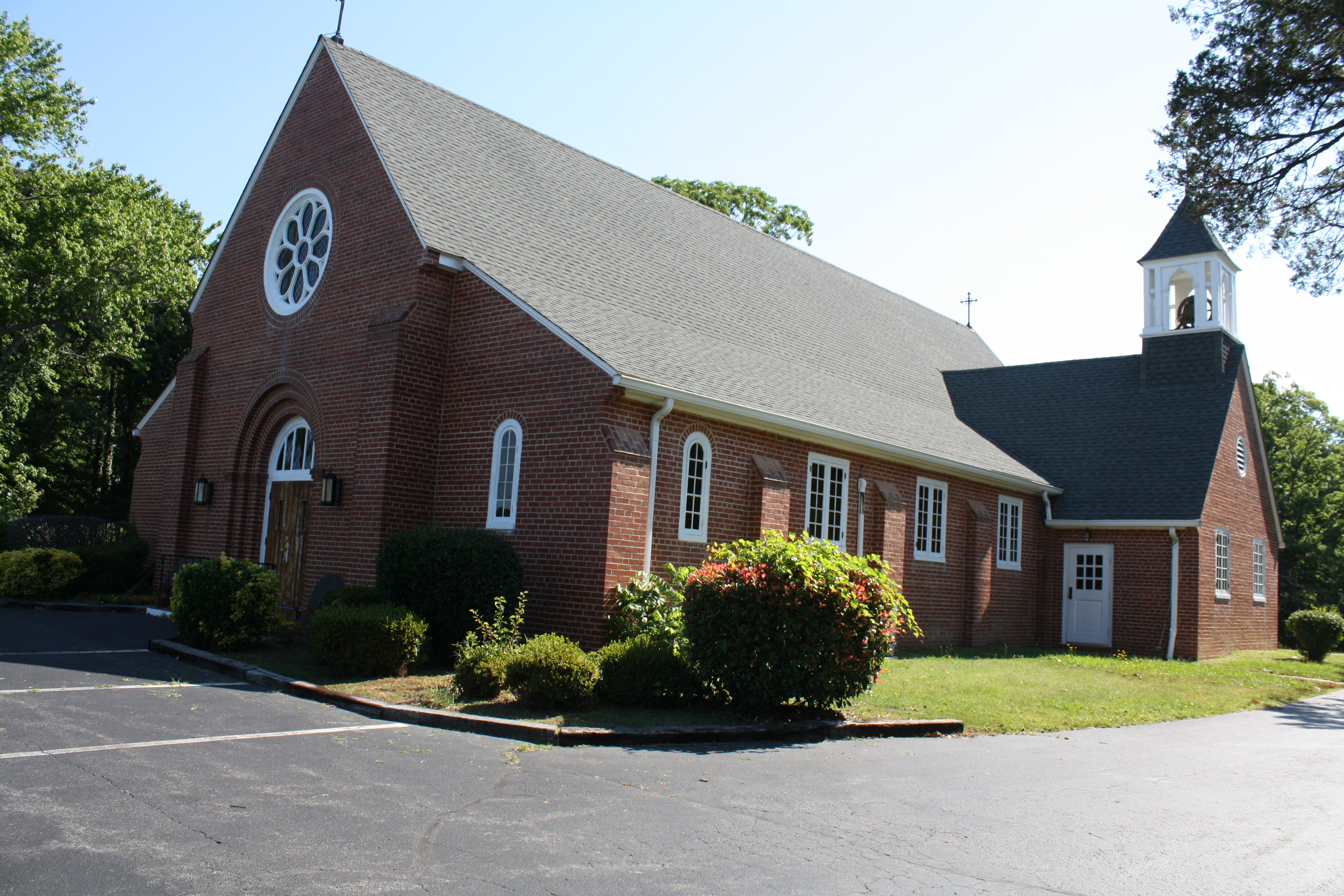
- St. Peter Claver Catholic Church

- Location within Maryland
- Coordinates: 38°07′09″N 76°22′26″W
- Country: United States
- State: Maryland
- County: St. Mary's
- Elevation: 59 ft (18 m)
- Time zone: UTC-5 (Eastern (EST))
  - Summer (DST): UTC-4 (EDT)
- ZIP code: 20680
- Area codes: 301 and 240
- GNIS feature ID: 594897

Ridge is an unincorporated community in St. Mary's County, Maryland, United States. Bard's Field was listed on the National Register of Historic Places in 1976. It is near the southernmost tip of the western shore of Maryland, known as Point Lookout, has bodies of water on both sides, and has two popular seafood restaurants. A historically black Roman Catholic church is here, which formerly had a parochial school.

== Oblate Sisters of Providence ==
The Oblate Sisters of Providence, an African American order of Catholic Nuns, maintained a convent associated with St. Peter Clavers Catholic Church and worked with the local African American Catholic community in the first half of the 20th century. They also helped to run a local Catholic High school.

== Notable person ==
Louise Daniel Hutchinson, a historian of African American history, was born in Ridge.
