= Christ Episcopal Church (Chaptico, Maryland) =

Historic church in Maryland, United States

- U.S. National Register of Historic Places
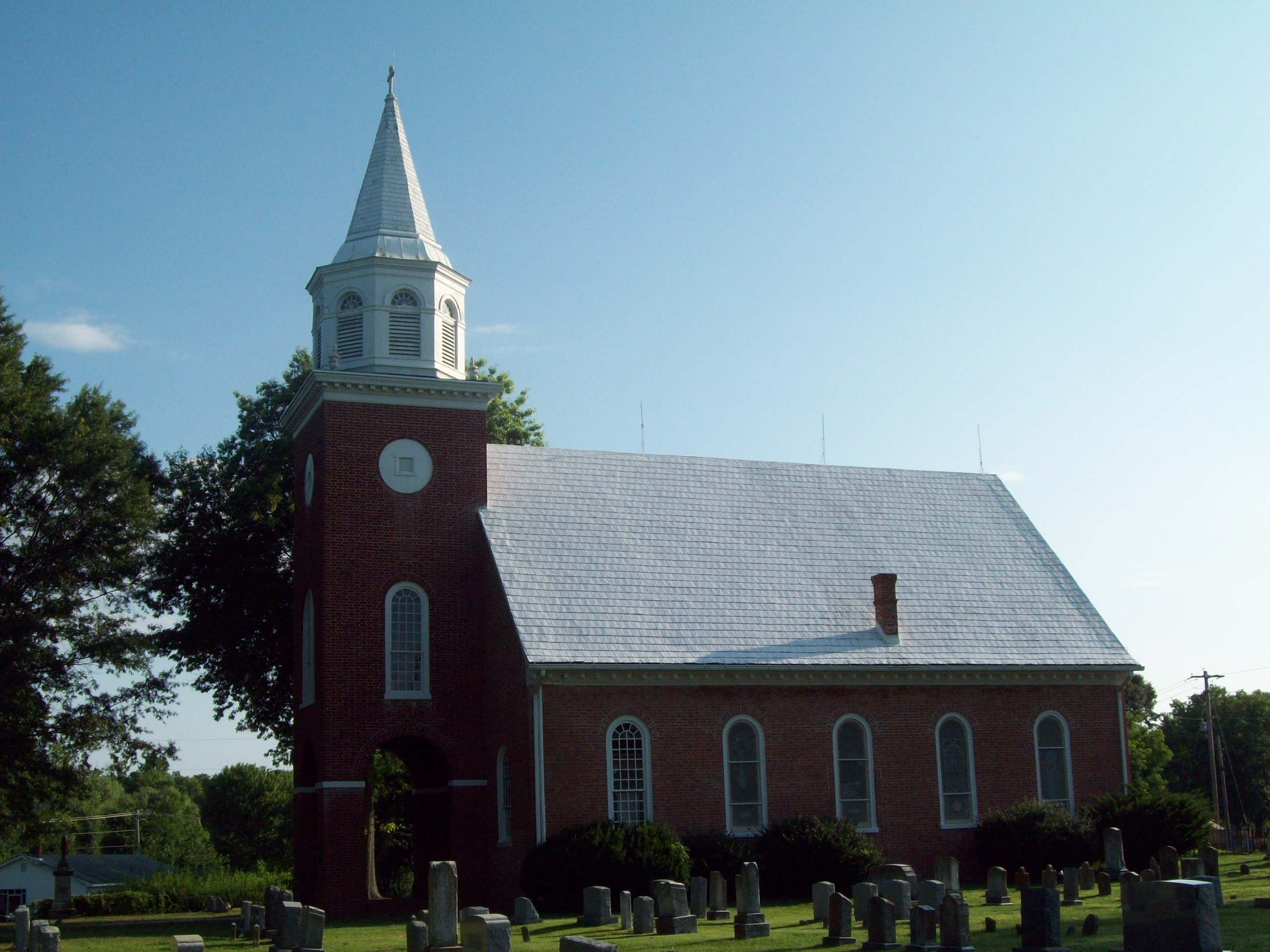
- Christ Episcopal Church, July 2009

- Location within Maryland Location within the United States
- Location: MD 238 (Maddox Rd.) SE of jct. with MD 234, Chaptico, Maryland
- Coordinates: 38°21′57″N 76°47′2″W
- Built: 1736
- Architectural style: Colonial
- NRHP reference No.: 94000728
- Added to NRHP: July 25, 1994

Christ Episcopal Church is a historic Episcopal church located at Chaptico, St. Mary's County, Maryland, United States. It was constructed in 1736 of Flemish bond brick construction with glazed headers, 60 feet long and 40 feet wide, with an original semicircular brick apse. In 1913, a three-story brick tower with octagonal belfry and spire was added to the west end of the church. The building was constructed under the supervision of Philip Key, vestryman, who was the great-grandfather of Francis Scott Key. The building was heavily damaged on July 30, 1814, during the War of 1812, when an admiral of the British fleet came ashore and took possession of the village of Chaptico. Surrounding the church is a cemetery with 18th, 19th, and 20th century markers, including a vault for the Key family. Christ Church Parish was one of the original 30 Anglican parishes in the Province of Maryland.

Christ Episcopal Church was listed on the National Register of Historic Places in 1994.
