= Dameron (surname) =

Dameron or sometimes spelled Damron is a surname with the following notable people:

- Tadd Dameron, noted jazz musician
- Dick Damron, Canadian country music singer
- Robert Damron, American professional golfer

== Fictional characters ==
- Kes Dameron, a Rebel sergeant in the comic miniseries Star Wars: Shattered Empire
- Poe Dameron, Kes' son and Resistance pilot in the sequel era of the Star Wars universe
