= Dameron, West Virginia =

Unincorporated community in West Virginia, United States

Dameron
- Unincorporated community
- Location within the state of West Virginia Dameron (the United States)
- Coordinates: 37°49′31″N 81°22′9″W
- Country: United States
- State: West Virginia
- County: Raleigh
- Elevation: 1,716 ft (523 m)
- Time zone: UTC-5 (Eastern (EST))
  - Summer (DST): UTC-4 (EDT)
- GNIS ID: 1558355

Dameron is an unincorporated community in Raleigh County, West Virginia, United States.

The community was named after the local Dameron family.
