= Chaptico, Maryland =

Unincorporated community in Maryland, U.S.

Coordinates: 38°22′03″N 76°46′59″W

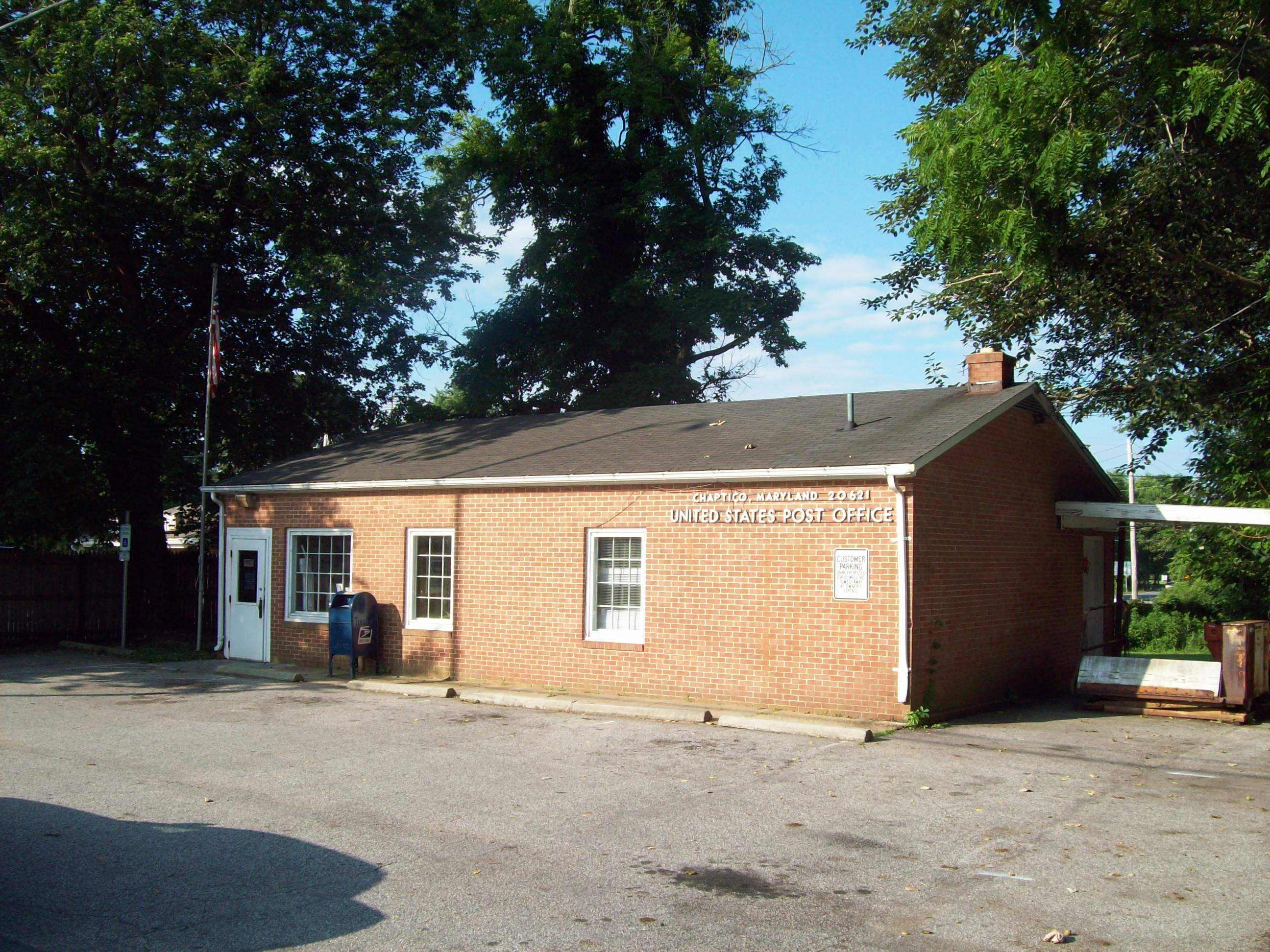
U.S. Post Office, Chaptico, Maryland, July 2009

Chaptico is an unincorporated community in St. Mary's County, Maryland, United States. It lies on Chaptico Run, which forms a bay as it enters the Wicomico River.

== History ==
Chaptico may be Algonquian for "big-broad-river-it-is" and related to the friendly Chaptico tribe visited by Gov. Charles Calvert in 1663. The town was a shipping point until the Wicomico River silted up in the 18th century. It was damaged by the British in 1813, during the War of 1812. Some of its prominent citizens were pro-Southern and jailed during the Civil War.

Chaptico has a number of properties listed on the National Register of Historic Places, including Bachelor's Hope, Christ Episcopal Church, and Deep Falls. Nearby are Maryland International Raceway, Budds Creek Raceway, and the golf course community of Wicomico Shores.
