= Bard's Field =

Historic house in Maryland

- U.S. National Register of Historic Places
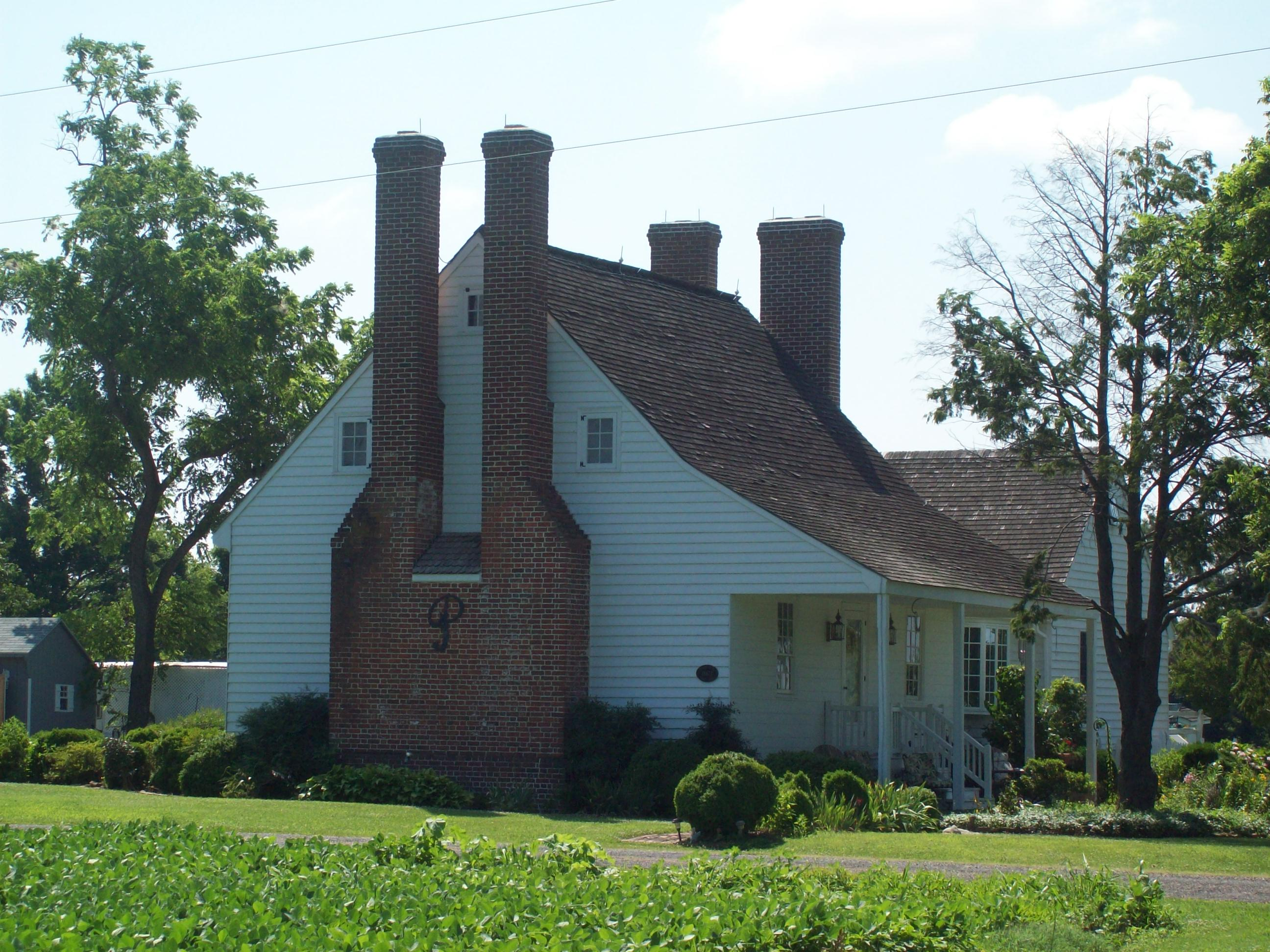
- Bard's Field, July 2009

- Location within Maryland Location within the United States
- Nearest city: Ridge, Maryland
- Coordinates: 38°5′53″N 76°23′1″W
- Built: 1800
- NRHP reference No.: 76002172
- Added to NRHP: November 7, 1976

Bard's Field, or Bard's Field on Trinity Manor, is a historic home located at Ridge, St. Mary's County, Maryland, United States. It was built in the early 19th century. It is a 1 1/2-story frame house on a brick foundation with double exterior end chimneys. The house is representative of a common, 18th century, Southern Maryland house type. Formerly operated as a bed and breakfast.

Bard's Field was listed on the National Register of Historic Places in 1976.
