= Abell House (Leonardtown, Maryland) =

Historic house in Maryland

- U.S. National Register of Historic Places
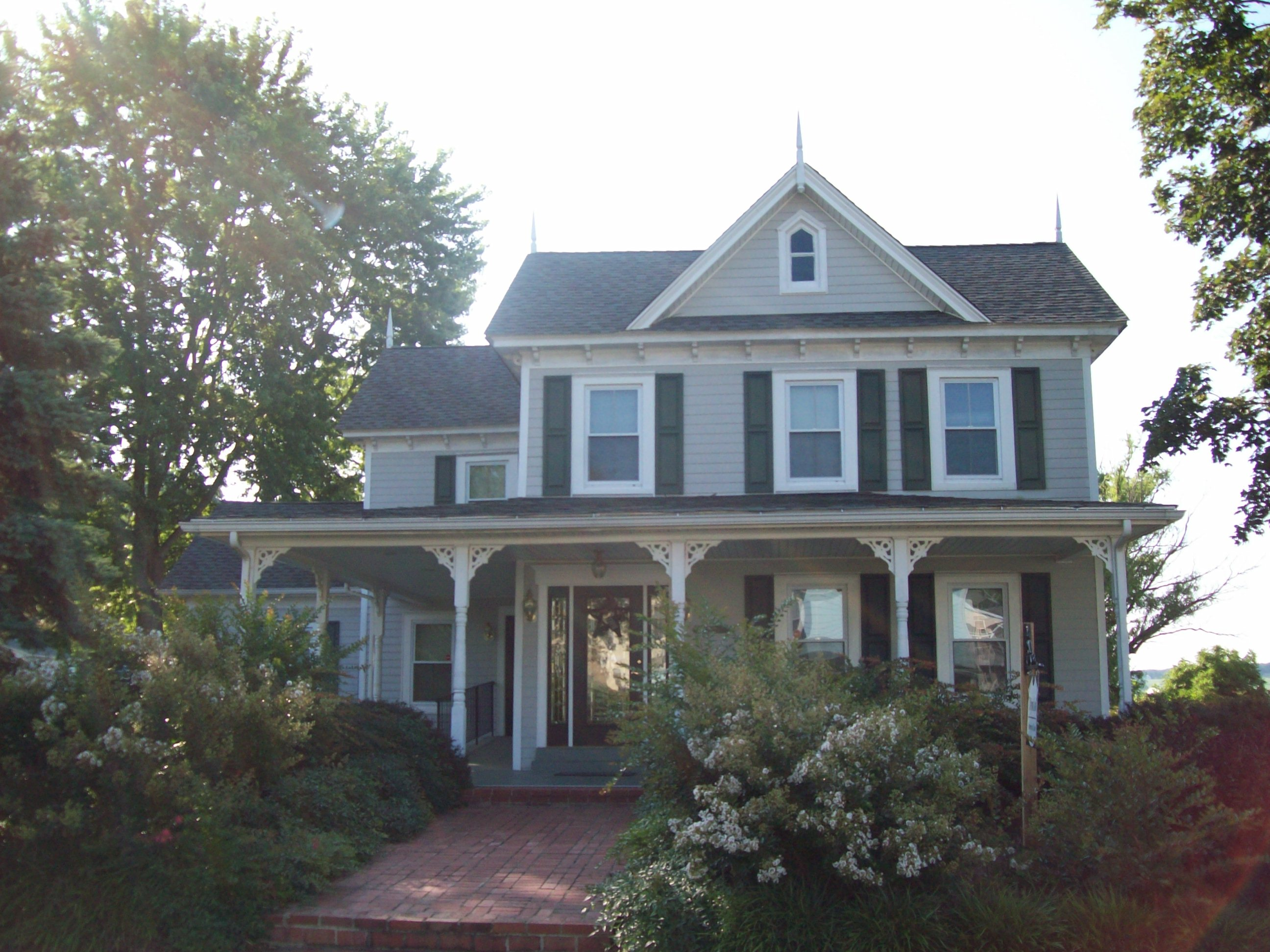
- Abell house, July 2009

- Location within Maryland Location within the United States
- Location: 22530 Washington St., MD 326, Leonardtown, Maryland
- Coordinates: 38°17′20″N 76°38′16″W
- Built: 1901
- Architectural style: Queen Anne
- NRHP reference No.: 03001324
- Added to NRHP: December 22, 2003

Abell House is a historic home located at Leonardtown, St. Mary's County, Maryland, United States. It was constructed about 1910 and is a two-story, three bay frame dwelling. The house commands sweeping views of Breton Bay, a sheltered harbor of the Potomac River. It exhibits a vernacular interpretation of the Queen Anne. It was built by Enoch B. Abell, a significant local political leader, attorney, and entrepreneur, who resided there until his death in December 1924.

Abell House was listed on the National Register of Historic Places in 2003.
