= Bachelor's Hope (Chaptico, Maryland) =

Historic house in Maryland

- U.S. National Register of Historic Places
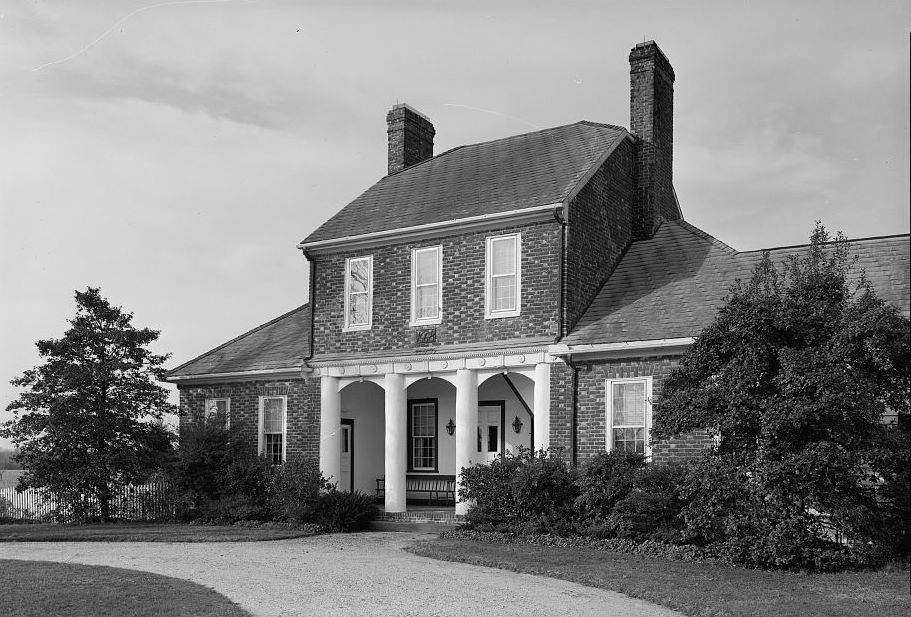
- Bachelors Hope, 1937

- Location within Maryland Location within the United States
- Location: Off MD 238, Chaptico, Maryland
- Coordinates: 38°20′9″N 76°47′25″W
- NRHP reference No.: 72001483
- Added to NRHP: November 7, 1972

Bachelor's Hope is a historic home located at Chaptico, St. Mary's County, Maryland, listed as probably built between 1753 and 1790.

It is known for the two-story brick central block with a jerkinhead roof, which contains one large ground-floor room. On either side are one-story, two-room brick wings. No other known 18th century structure in the state exists with a similar combination of the "Great Hall" plan, facade, and component features.

It was listed on the National Register of Historic Places in 1972.
