= Mulberry Fields =

Historic house in Maryland, United States

- U.S. National Register of Historic Places
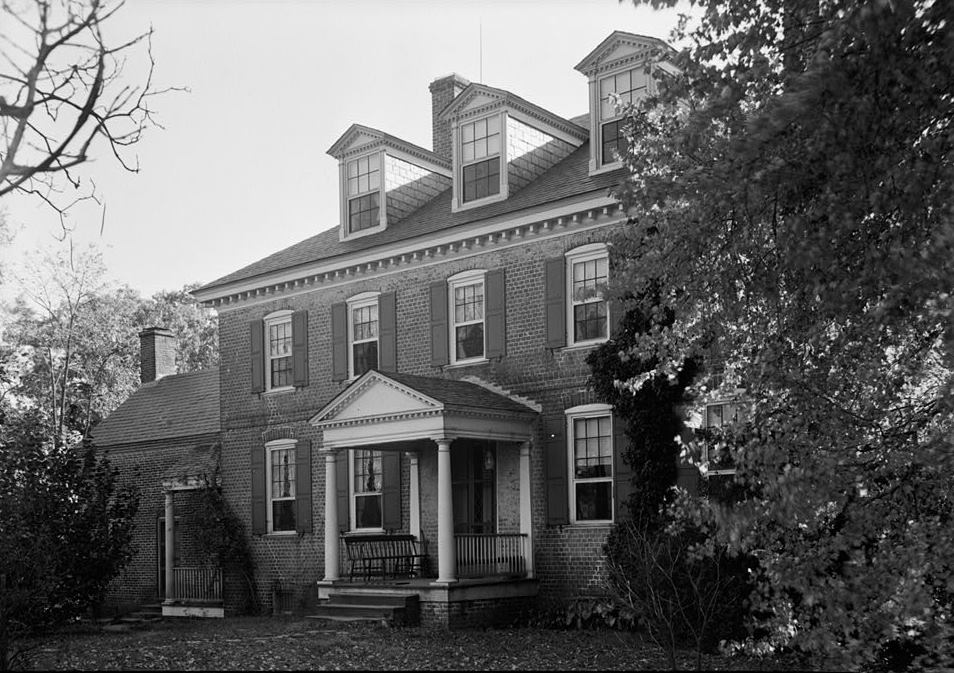
- Mulberry Fields, 1936

- Location within Maryland Location within the United States
- Nearest city: Beauvue, Maryland
- Coordinates: 38°12′32″N 76°34′22″W
- Built: 1763
- Architect: John Attaway Clarke
- NRHP reference No.: 73002169
- Added to NRHP: March 14, 1973

Mulberry Fields is a historic 13,458 sq ft (1,250.3 m^{2}) home located at Beauvue, St. Mary's County, Maryland, United States. It was built about 1763, and is a large 2 1/2-story, 5-bay by 2-bay, hip-roofed brick house. On the front is a two-story Doric portico, built about 1820. The house is the only remaining Georgian "mansion-type" home in the area and has a panoramic view of the Potomac River, with a mile-long allee stretching downhill to the riverbank.

Mulberry Fields was listed on the National Register of Historic Places in 1973.

It remains a private residence and is listed for sale for 20 million.
