= Drayden, Maryland =

Unincorporated community in Maryland, U.S.

Coordinates: 38°10′43″N 76°28′54″W

Drayden is an unincorporated community in St. Mary's County, Maryland, United States. West St. Mary's Manor was listed on the National Register of Historic Places in 1970. Porto Bello was listed in 1972.

The Drayden Schoolhouse was a small, one-room African American children's school featuring grades 1–7. It was open and operational from 1890 to 1944. The land was donated by Mary Ellen and Daniel A. Gross in 1889. The schoolhouse was a one-room design based on a Victorian design like other one-room schools already operational in St. Mary's County. The original green paint is still inside the structure. Exterior paint was added in 2000 to preserve the original sliding planks.

The Drayden schoolhouse was one of three for African American children in the Valley Lee District. One teacher taught grades 1-7 and could have had as many as forty students in the single room. At this time there were no public high schools open to African American students. They did not have a public high school for African American children until 1934. Until that time, most African American children did not have the ability to attend school beyond the seventh grade. Schools were not de-segregated in St. Mary's County, Maryland until 1967.

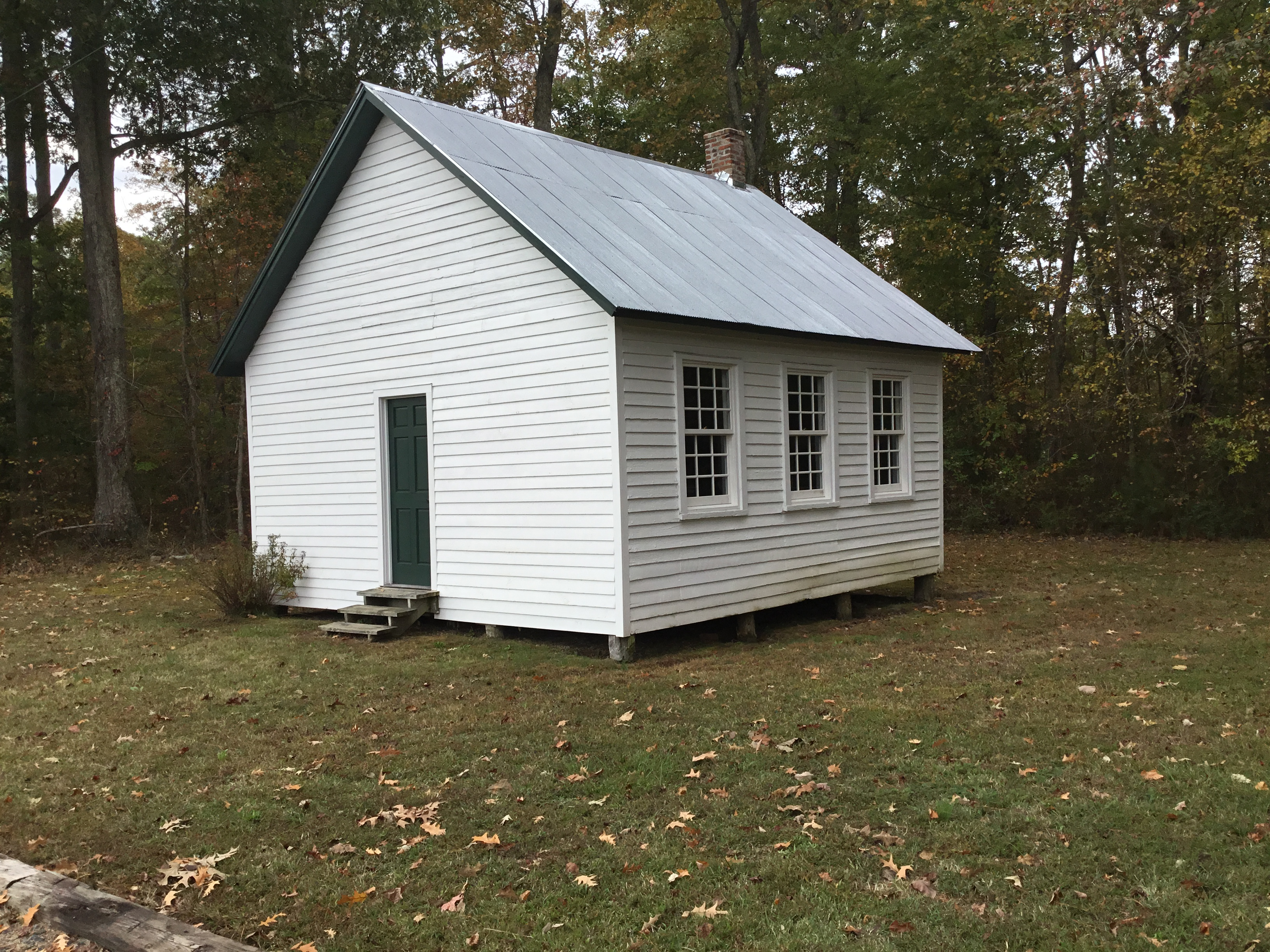
Drayden Schoolhouse in St. Mary's County, Maryland
