= Oakville, St. Mary's County, Maryland =

Unincorporated community in Maryland, U.S.

Coordinates: 38°23′28″N 76°38′37″W

Oakville is an unincorporated community in St. Mary's County, Maryland, United States. Sandgates On Cat Creek, a historic home in Oakville, was listed on the National Register of Historic Places in 1978. The area was the scene of the murder of Stephanie Roper.
