= St. George's Episcopal Church (Valley Lee, Maryland) =

Historic church in Maryland, United States

- St. George's Protestant Episcopal Church
- U.S. National Register of Historic Places
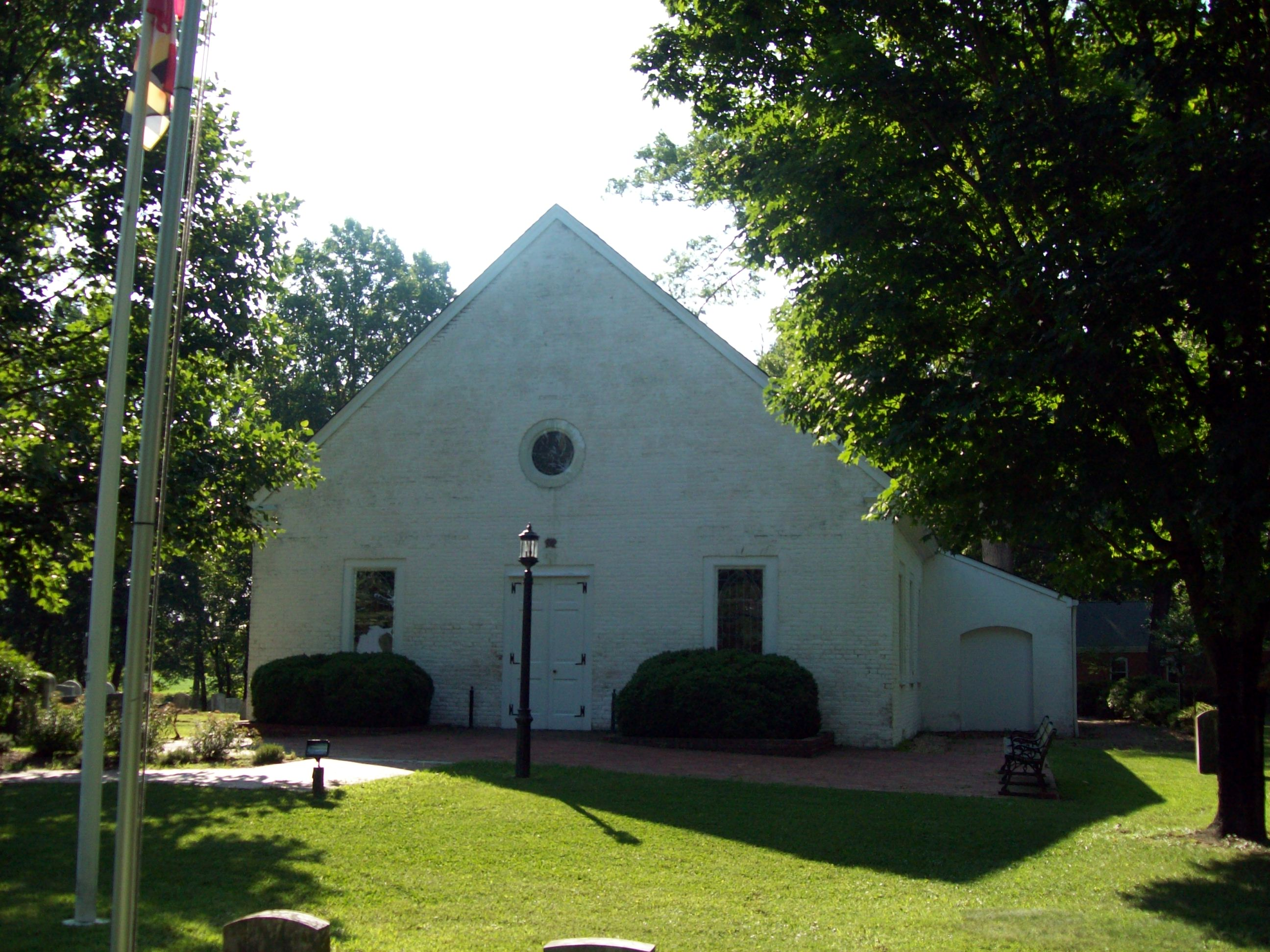
- St. George's Protestant Episcopal Church, July 2009

- Location within Maryland Location within the United States
- Location: Off Maryland Route 249 on Maryland Route 244, west of Valley Lee, Maryland
- Coordinates: 38°11′42″N 76°31′16″W
- Built: 1638
- NRHP reference No.: 73002173
- Added to NRHP: October 3, 1973

St. George's Episcopal Church is a historic church located at 44965 Blake Creek Road, in Valley Lee, St. Mary's County, Maryland, United States. It was built in 1799 on the same site as three other, earlier churches. It is a one-story, five-bay, rectangular, gable-front, Flemish bond brick structure. The interior has been restored to its 1884 appearance. The church is surrounded by a graveyard, enclosed by a low brick wall. It is generally believed that St. George's is the site of the oldest Anglican church in Maryland whose parish is still in existence. William and Mary Parish, as it was originally known, was one of the original 30 Anglican parishes in the Province of Maryland.

The church was listed on the National Register of Historic Places in 1973.

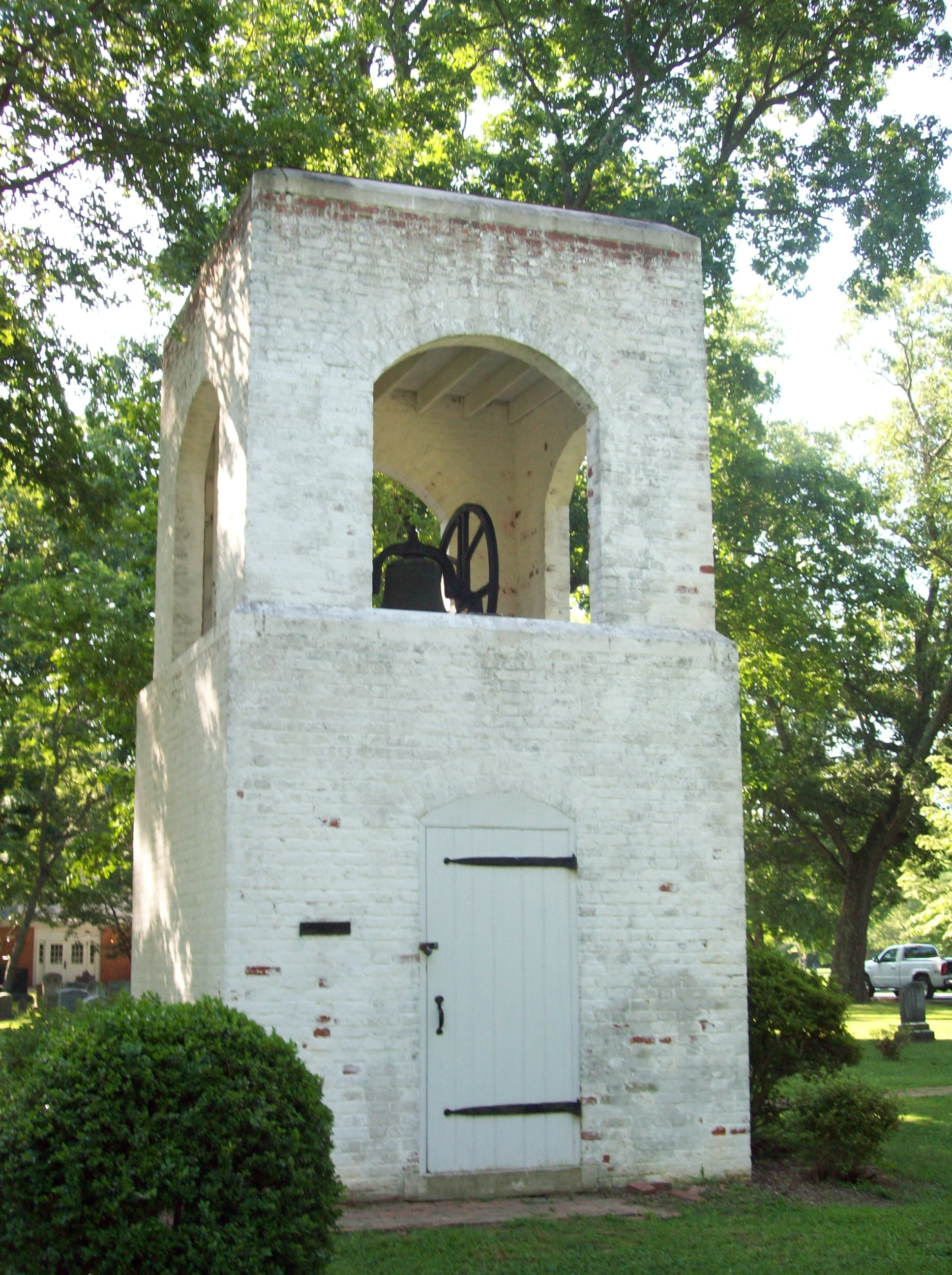
Belfry, July 2009
