= Dameron, Maryland =

Unincorporated community in Maryland, U.S.

Coordinates: 38°09′08″N 76°22′10″W

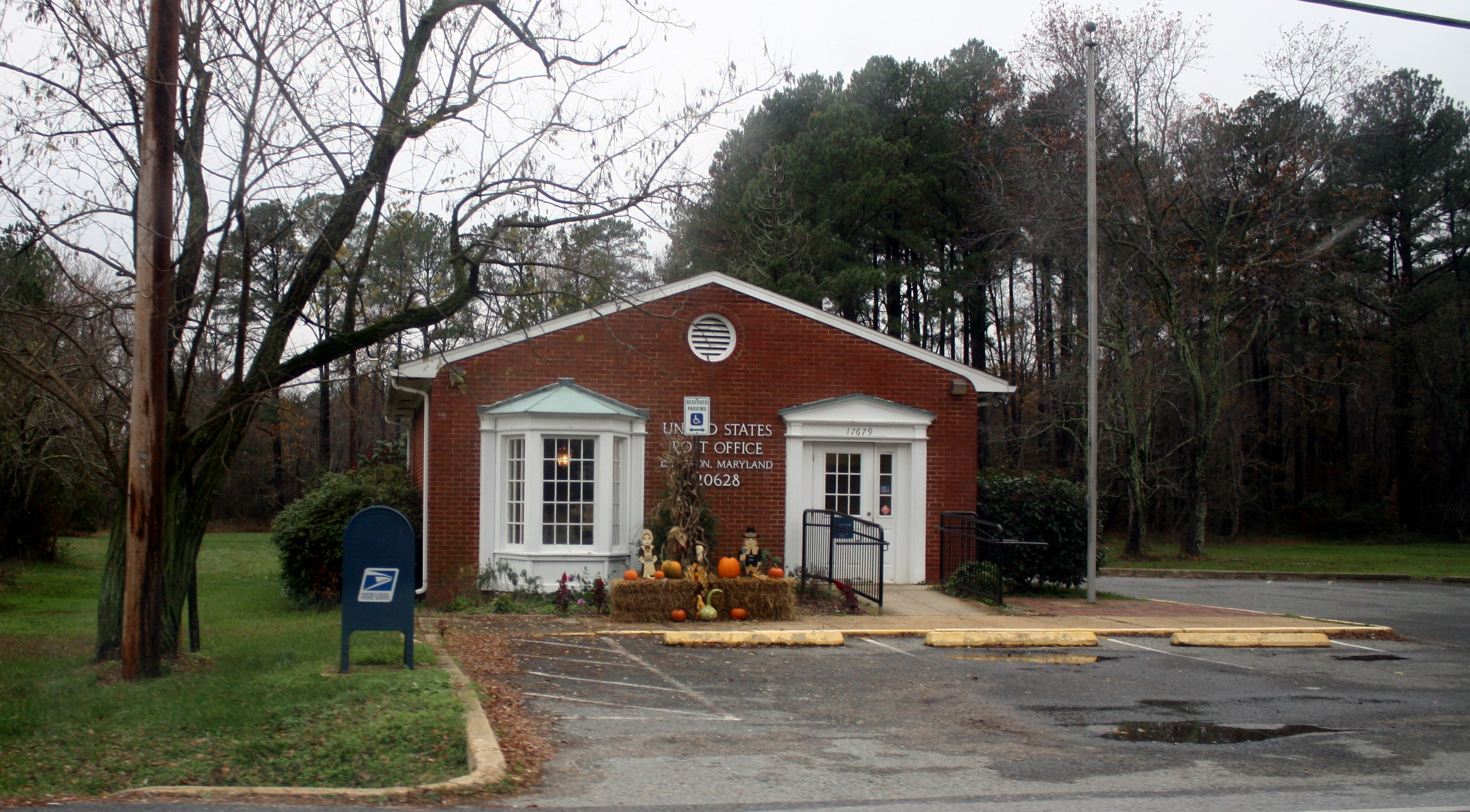
Post office in Dameron

Dameron is an unincorporated community in St. Mary's County, Maryland, United States. The Point No Point Light Station was listed on the National Register of Historic Places in 2002. The ZIP Code for Dameron is 20628.
