= Callaway, Maryland =

Coordinates: 38°14′18″N 76°31′09″W

Callaway
- Census-designated place
- Interactive map of Callaway
- Country: United States of America
- State: Maryland
- County: St. Mary's

Area
  - Total: 4.77 sq mi (12.36 km^{2})
  - Land: 4.76 sq mi (12.34 km^{2})
  - Water: 0.0077 sq mi (0.02 km^{2})

Population (2020)
  - Total: 1,779
  - Density: 373.5/sq mi (144.19/km^{2})
- Time zone: UTC-5 (Eastern (EST))
  - Summer (DST): UTC-4 (EDT)
- FIPS code: 24-12175

Callaway is a census designated place in St. Mary's County, Maryland, United States. The elevation is 105 feet (32 m). Per the 2020 Census, the population was 1,779.

== Demographics ==
Historical population
Census	Pop.	Note	%±
2020	1,779		—
U.S. Decennial Census; 2020

Callaway first appeared as a census designated place in the 2020 U.S. census.

=== 2020 census ===
As of the 2020 census, Callaway had a population of 1,779. The median age was 38.3 years. 24.0% of residents were under the age of 18 and 10.2% of residents were 65 years of age or older. For every 100 females there were 100.8 males, and for every 100 females age 18 and over there were 89.9 males age 18 and over.

48.4% of residents lived in urban areas, while 51.6% lived in rural areas.

There were 688 households in Callaway, of which 36.8% had children under the age of 18 living in them. Of all households, 47.5% were married-couple households, 21.7% were households with a male householder and no spouse or partner present, and 21.9% were households with a female householder and no spouse or partner present. About 27.9% of all households were made up of individuals and 9.6% had someone living alone who was 65 years of age or older.

There were 734 housing units, of which 6.3% were vacant. The homeowner vacancy rate was 1.8% and the rental vacancy rate was 7.0%.

Callaway CDP, Maryland - Demographic Profile (NH = Non-Hispanic)
Race / Ethnicity	Pop 2020	% 2020
White alone (NH)	1,323	74.37%
Black or African American alone (NH)	200	11.24%
Native American or Alaska Native alone (NH)	7	0.396%
Asian alone (NH)	69	3.88%
Pacific Islander alone (NH)	3	0.173%
Some Other Race alone (NH)	2	0.11%
Mixed Race/Multi-Racial (NH)	103	5.79%
Hispanic or Latino (any race)	72	4.05%
Total	1,779	100.00%

Note: the US Census treats Hispanic/Latino as an ethnic category. This table excludes Latinos from the racial categories and assigns them to a separate category. Hispanics/Latinos can be of any race.
