= West St. Mary's Manor =

Historic house in Maryland, United States

- U.S. National Register of Historic Places
- U.S. National Historic Landmark
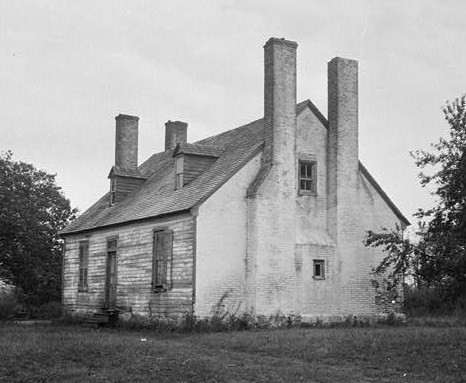
- West St. Mary's Manor photographed from the northwest circa 1939, before restoration

- Location within Maryland Location within the United States
- Nearest city: Drayden, Maryland
- Coordinates: 38°11′10″N 76°26′54″W
- Built: 1780s
- Architectural style: Central-passage house
- NRHP reference No.: 70000854

Significant dates
- Added to NRHP: April 15, 1970
- Designated NHL: April 15, 1970

West St. Mary's Manor is a historic house on West St. Mary's Manor Road in rural St. Mary's County, Maryland. Built in the 1780s according to dendrochronology and with a four-room center-hall plan, and is located on the first recorded English land grant in what is now Maryland. It was designated a National Historic Landmark in 1970.

== Description ==
West St. Mary's Manor is located across the St. Mary's River from St. Mary's City, Maryland, the first capital of the Province of Maryland. It is a 1 1/2-story brick and frame construction. The gable end walls of the 40-by-31-foot (12.2 by 9.4 m) house are brick with double chimneys, while the front and rear walls are clapboard. A brick "chimney pent" is situated between the projecting chimneys at both ends. The front elevation, facing south, is five bays wide, while the north elevation is three bays.

The interior comprises four rooms about a center hall running through the house. The main rooms are on the south side, with smaller rooms on the north. All of the first floor rooms have wainscoting and fireplaces. The chimney pents serve as closets for the main rooms. The center hall is divided by an arch, with a stair to the rear.

== History ==
West St. Mary's Manor originally included 2,000 acres (810 ha) granted to Captain Henry Fleete in 1634, the earliest grant recorded in Maryland. The house was believed to have been built between 1700 and 1730, possibly by the family of Daniel Bell who was one of 15 leaseholders for the larger property. However, tree ring analysis or dendrochronology established a later date in the 1780s. The house's architecture is typical of the transition from smaller earlier colonial houses, typically just two rooms, to larger homes with a center passage.

The house has been renovated and expanded with historically sympathetic additions.

== See also ==
- List of National Historic Landmarks in Maryland
- National Register of Historic Places listings in St. Mary's County, Maryland
