= Bay (architecture) =

Architectural space between elements

Elevation of a single bay of the nave of Canterbury Cathedral, by Robert Willis. The bay is bound by the columns supporting the vault.

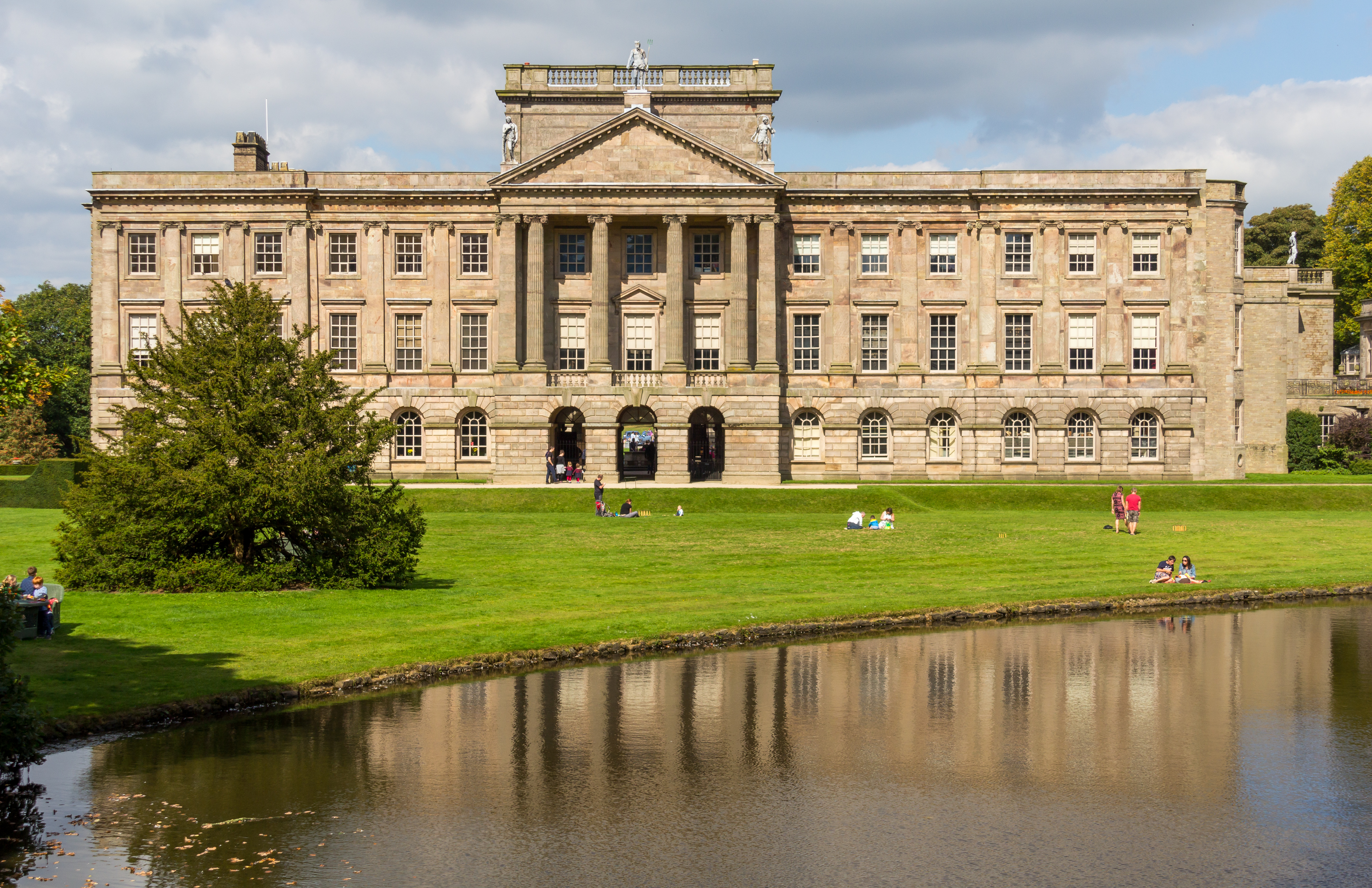
Lyme Park in Cheshire, England. The main facade is divided by pilasters into fifteen bays, equalling the number of windows.

In architecture, a bay is the space between architectural elements, or a recess or compartment. The term bay comes from Old French baie, meaning an opening or hole.

== Examples ==
- The spaces between posts, columns, or buttresses in the length of a building, the division in the widths being called aisles. For example, the Gothic Chartres Cathedral has a nave that is "seven bays long". Similarly in timber framing a bay is the space between posts in the transverse direction of the building and aisles run longitudinally.
- If there are no columns or other divisions but there are regularly-spaced windows, each window in a wall is counted as a bay. For example, Mulberry Fields, a Georgian style building in Maryland, United States, is described as "5 bay by 2 bay", meaning "5 windows at the front and 2 windows at the sides".
- A recess in a wall, such as a bay window.
- A division of space such as an animal stall, sick bay, or bay platform.
- The space between joists or rafters, a joist bay or rafter bay.

== East Asia ==
The Japanese ken and Korean kan are both bays themselves and measurements based upon their number and standard placement. Under the Joseon, Koreans were allocated a set number of bays in their residential architecture based upon their class.

== See also ==
- Architectural elements
