= Sandgates On Cat Creek =

Historic house in Maryland, United States

- U.S. National Register of Historic Places
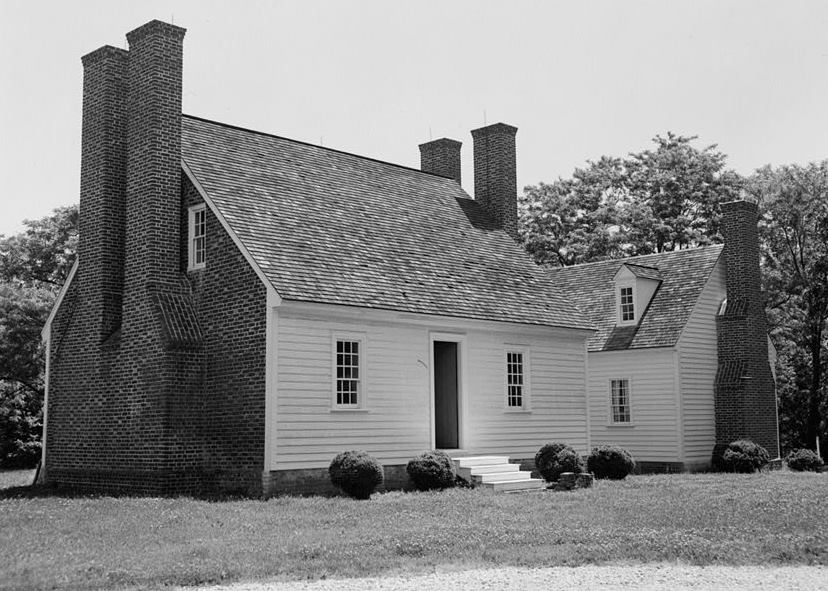
- Sandgates on Cat Creek, HABS Photograph

- Location within Maryland Location within the United States
- Nearest city: Oakville, Maryland
- Coordinates: 38°24′36″N 76°36′53″W
- Built: 1750
- NRHP reference No.: 78003179
- Added to NRHP: November 14, 1978

Sandgates On Cat Creek is a historic home located at Oakville, St. Mary's County, Maryland. It is a 1 1/2-story, three-bay frame structure with brick ends built between 1740 and 1780. It is one of the best and most authentic restorations in Southern Maryland.

It was listed on the National Register of Historic Places in 1978.
