= St. George Island, Maryland =

- Census-designated place
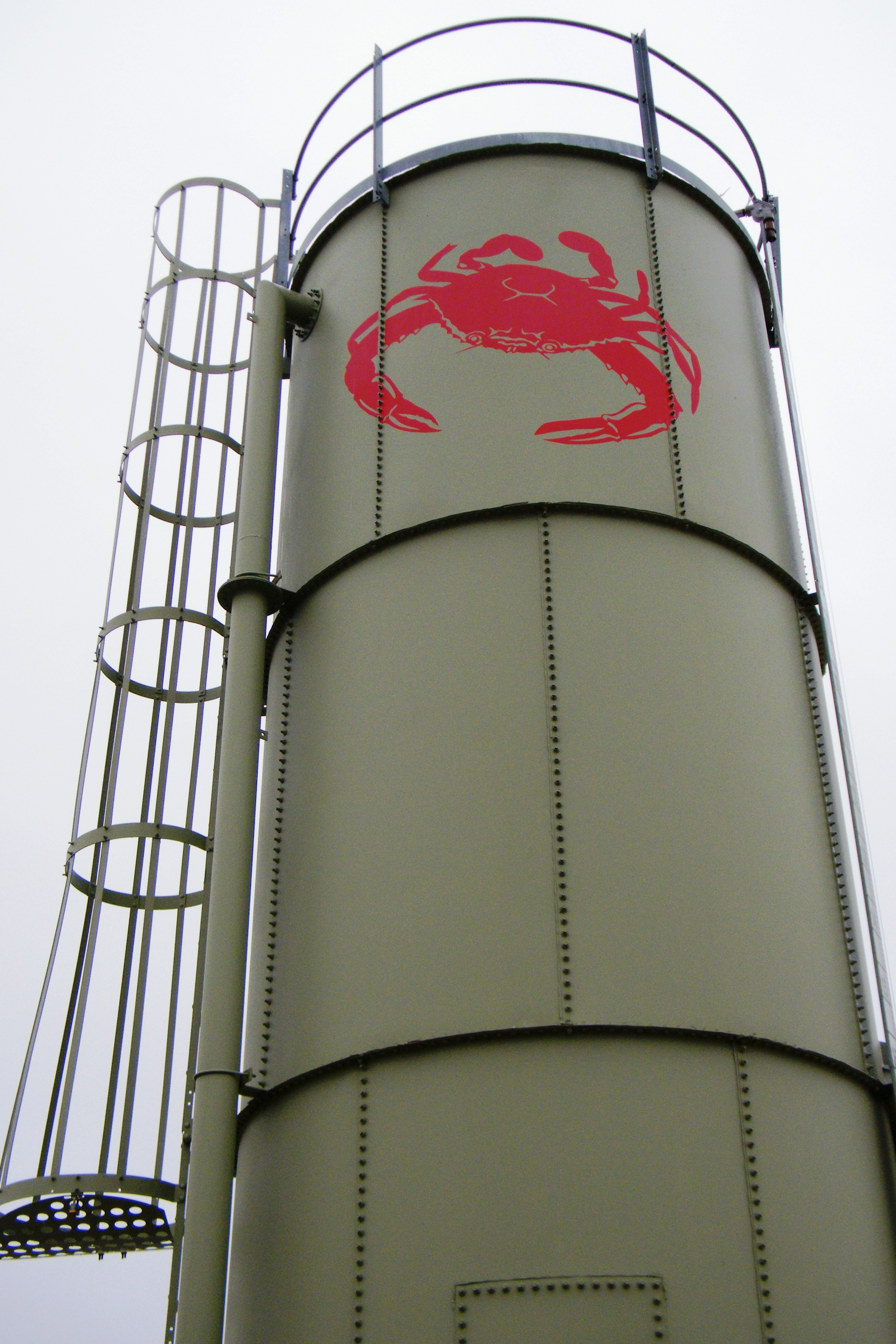
- Water Tower on St. George Island

- Location within Maryland Location within the United States
- Coordinates: 38°07′12″N 76°29′01″W
- Country: United States
- State: Maryland

Area
  - Total: 0.93 sq mi (2.41 km^{2})
  - Land: 0.79 sq mi (2.04 km^{2})
  - Water: 0.14 sq mi (0.37 km^{2})

Population (2020)
  - Total: 265
  - Density: 336.2/sq mi (129.79/km^{2})
- Time zone: UTC−5 (Eastern (EST))
  - Summer (DST): UTC−4 (EDT)
- FIPS code: 24-69425
- GNIS feature ID: 594921

St. George Island is an unincorporated census-designated place in St. Mary's County, Maryland, United States. The post office at Piney Point serves the island, which is connected to the mainland by a short bridge. During the War of 1812, the British made the island their headquarters, and raided shipyards and river plantations from this base. Many tall pines on the island were cut and shipped to England for ship masts. In the 19th century the Roman Catholic Church, which owned the island, finally opened it to settlement, including some settlers who migrated from Smith Island.

== Demographics ==
Historical population
Census	Pop.	Note	%±
2020	265		—
U.S. Decennial Census

== Revolutionary War ==
On July 17, 1776, St. George Island, Maryland was the site of a battle in the American Revolutionary War where British forces under the command of John Murray, 4th Earl of Dunmore attempted to land on the mainland in Maryland. Maryland's Flying Camp militia under the command of Captain Rezin Beall, who was wounded in action in this battle, repulsed the invading British, preventing the invasion of the mainland.
