= Valley Lee, Maryland =

Unincorporated community in Maryland, U.S.

Coordinates: 38°11′45″N 76°30′46″W

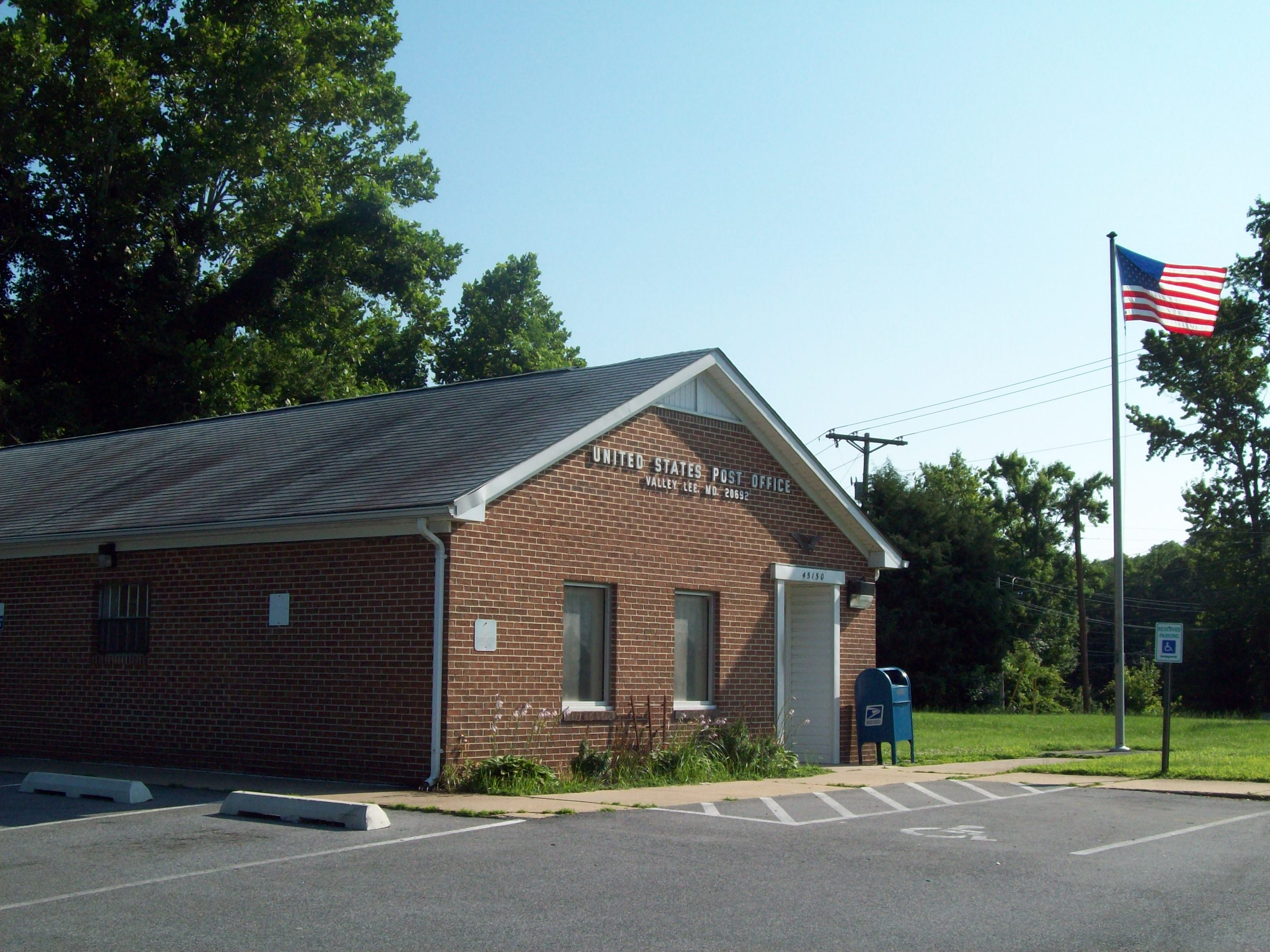
U.S. Post Office, Valley Lee, Maryland, July 2009

Valley Lee is an unincorporated community in St. Mary's County, Maryland, United States. The St. George's Episcopal Church was listed on the National Register of Historic Places in 1973. Another landmark of Valley Lee is the 100-year-old Russells Store, a country store, barber/beauty shop, and local tavern. The ZIP code for Valley Lee is 20692.
