= Beauvue, Maryland =

Unincorporated community in Maryland, U.S.

Coordinates: 38°15′10″N 76°37′36″W

Beauvue is an unincorporated community in St. Mary's County, Maryland, United States. Mulberry Fields was listed on the National Register of Historic Places in 1973.
