= St. Mary's City, Maryland =

Unincorporated community in United States

- Unincorporated community
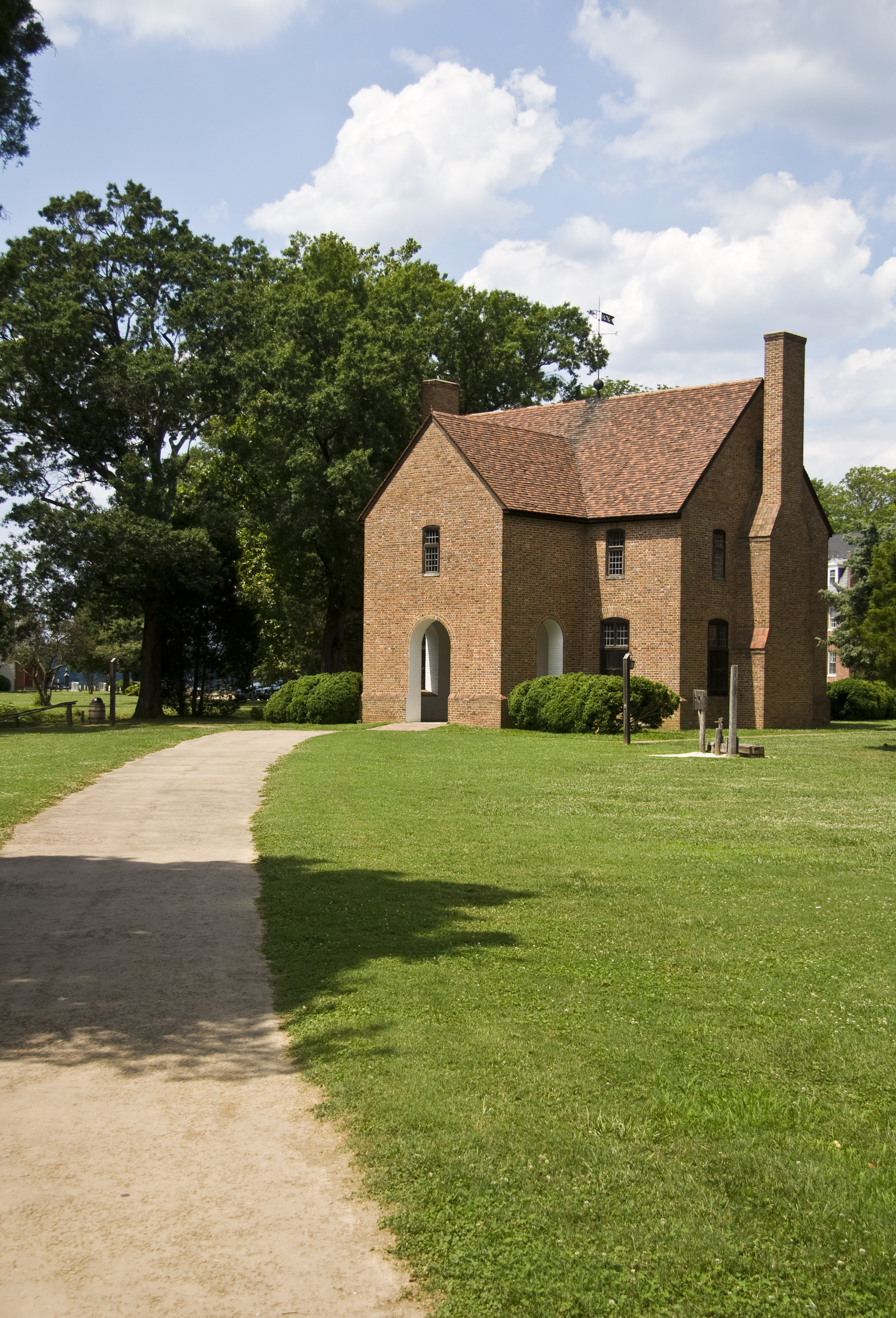
- "The State House", a reconstruction of the original 1676 Maryland Statehouse, Maryland's first capitol building and also the home of the Maryland colonial assembly, which stands near the original site.

- Location within the U.S. state of Maryland St. Mary's City, Maryland (the United States)
- Coordinates: 38°11′21″N 76°25′56″W
- Country: United States
- State: Maryland
- County: St. Mary's
- Founded: March 27, 1634
- Founder: Leonard Calvert

Area
  - Total: 1.20000 sq mi (3.10799 km^{2})
  - Land: 1.10000 sq mi (2.84899 km^{2})
  - Water: 0.100000 sq mi (0.258999 km^{2})

Population (2010)
  - Total: 933 year round residents plus about 1,400 student residents during spring and fall semesters
  - Density: 848/sq mi (327/km^{2})
- Time zone: Eastern (EST)
  - Summer (DST): eastern (Americas)
- ZIP code: 20686
- Birthplace of religious freedom in North America with the passage of the Maryland Act of Toleration in 1649. The first place where a (possibly) African American person, Mathias De Sousa, served in an assembly as a voting legislator and first place where a woman, Margaret Brent, petitioned (unsuccessfully) for the right to vote.
- St. Mary's City Historic District
- U.S. National Register of Historic Places
- U.S. National Historic Landmark District
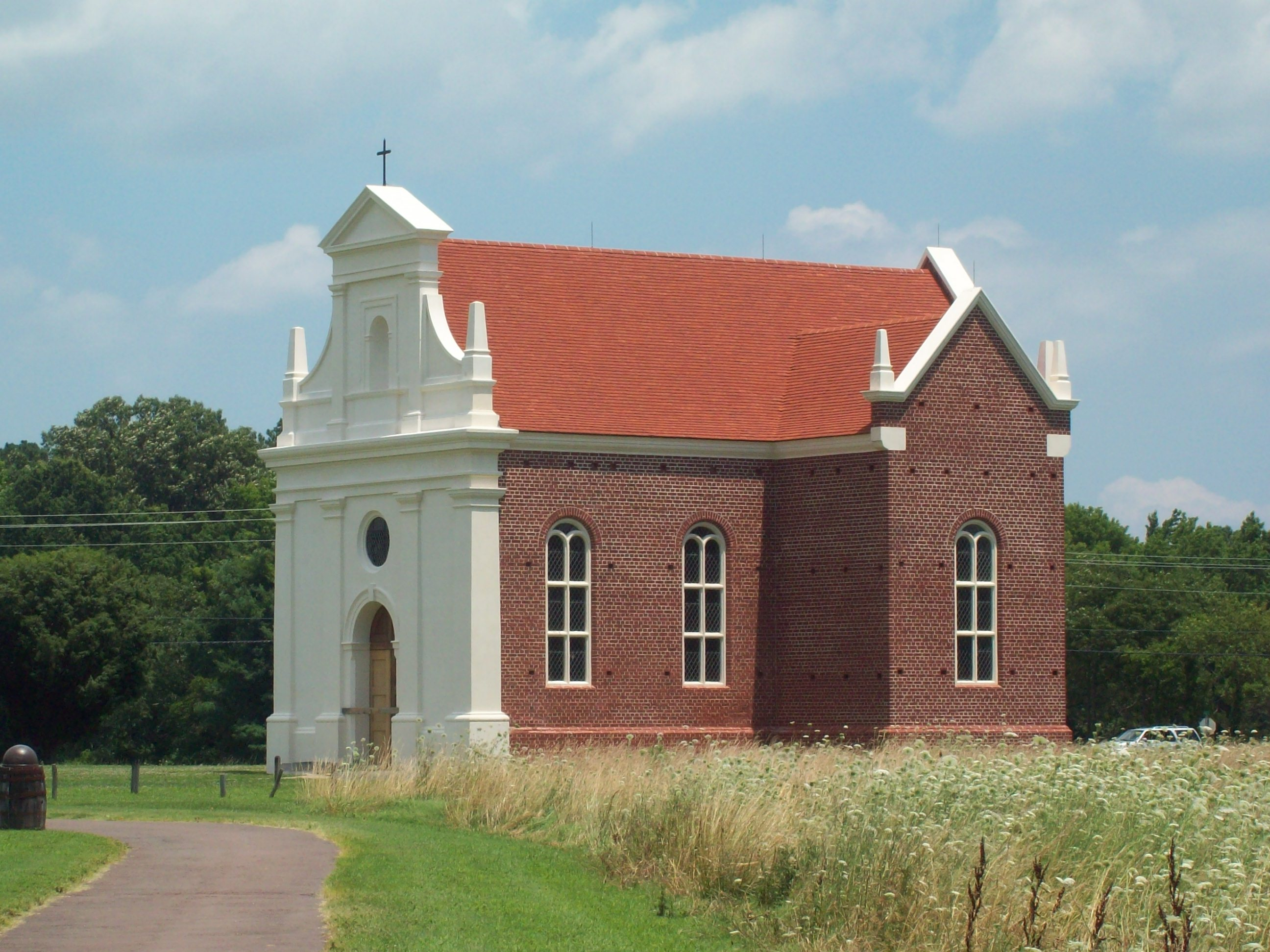
- St. Mary's City Historic District: Reconstructed 1667 Catholic Church, built on site of the original Jesuit mission church in the St. Mary's City colonial settlement, Maryland's first colony. HSMC, July 2009
- Nearest city: St. Mary's City, Maryland
- Built: c. 1667. Rebuilt 2009.
- NRHP reference No.: 69000310

Significant dates
- Added to NRHP: August 4, 1969
- Designated NHLD: August 4, 1969

St. Mary's City (also known as Historic St. Mary's City) is a former colonial town that was founded in March 1634, as Maryland's first capital. It is now a state-run historic area, which includes a reconstruction of the original colonial settlement and a designated living history venue and museum complex. Half the area is occupied by the campus of St. Mary's College of Maryland. The entire area contains a community of about 933 permanent residents and some 1,400 students living in campus dorms and apartments.

The city is an unincorporated community under Maryland state law and is located in southern St. Mary's County, which occupies the southernmost tip of the state on the western shore of Chesapeake Bay. The community is bordered by the St. Mary's River, a short, brackish-water tidal tributary of the Potomac River, near where it empties into the Chesapeake.

St. Mary's City is the historic site of the founding of the Province of Maryland, where it served as the colonial capital from 1634 until 1694 — in 1695, Annapolis became the location of the legislature. The original settlement is the fourth oldest permanent English settlement in the United States.

Notably, St. Mary's City is the earliest site of religious freedom being established in the United States, as it is the first North American colonial settlement established with a specific mandate of providing haven for people of both Catholic and Protestant Christian faiths.

It is also an internationally recognized archaeological research area and training center for archaeologists, and is home to the Historical Archaeology Field School. There have been over 200 archeological digs in St. Mary's City over the last 30 years. Archaeological research continues in the city.

== Historic St. Mary's City: Reconstructed colonial town and living history ==
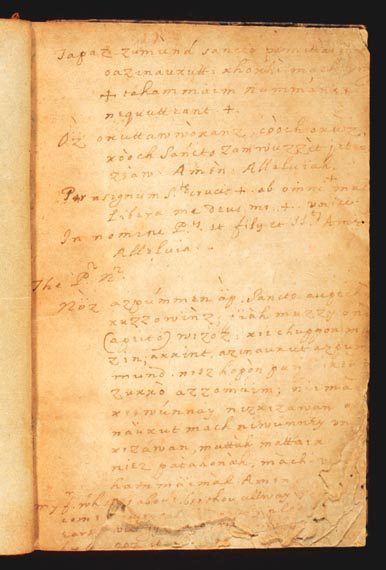
A journal book containing translations from English to Latin to the Piscataway Indian language, believed to be written by Father Andrew White, a Jesuit missionary in St. Mary's City

Historic St. Mary's City is a large public access historic interpretation area with four public museums and is a re-creation of the original colonial capital of Maryland and also the original settlers village.

It has several living history museums, and the entire complex is staffed by period dressed actors who recreate history theatrically, as well as archeologists and archeology students who provide scientific and historical interpretation, public archeological site displays, reconstructed colonial buildings, including ongoing year-round outdoor historical reenactments, a working colonial farm and the fully working replica of The Dove sailing ship, which was one of the "two original settlers ships that established the first Maryland colony" (Maryland's historical equivalent of the Mayflower).

Historic St. Mary's City also provides presentations on different aspects of colonial era woodland Indian life. At special times of the year, members of the Piscataway Indian Nation also provide reenactments and other cultural demonstrations. The Piscataway people were the original inhabitants of St. Mary's City and also befriended and helped the early colonists.

The area also hosts summer stock theater productions (with historical themes) and other special events. Historic St. Mary's City is owned by the State of Maryland and runs under a registered nonprofit charter. In addition to general tourism, the organization hosts special tours for school children, handling more than 20,000 students on field trips per year.

Historic St. Mary's is under the administration of the "Historic St. Mary's City Commission", a government agency of the State of Maryland.

== St. Mary's College of Maryland ==
The public honors college, St. Mary's College of Maryland, is a state-funded coed undergraduate liberal arts college. It is only one of two "Public Honors Colleges" in the nation and one of only a handful of small public liberal arts colleges. It was specifically tasked by the state of Maryland to be modeled after far more expensive private elite liberal arts colleges with the intention of offering such an education in the public sector.

The school is secular (nonreligious); the name commemorates the original colonial settlement by that name, half of which was located where the college now stands.

== History of St. Mary's City ==
=== Beginnings ===
==== George Calvert ====
Colonial St. Mary's City was first envisioned by an English Lord, George Calvert. Calvert had been born in Yorkshire to a Catholic family, but when he was twelve, the local authorities compelled his parents to send George and his brother Christopher to a Protestant tutor. From then on George conformed to the established religion and had a successful career in service to the crown. His first attempt at establishing a colony was in 1621 in the Province of Avalon on land he purchased in Newfoundland, but after a few years, Calvert decided a warmer climate would be a better location.

After his wife's death in 1622, and a shift in his political fortunes, in 1625 Calvert resigned his position as a secretary of state and returned to the religion of his childhood, at a time of continued religious persecution of the Roman Catholics in England. In 1631, Calvert obtained a grant from King Charles I in recognition of his services to king and country. It had been a dream of George Calvert to establish a colony in North America and to also make it a haven for persecuted Catholics.

==== Cecil Calvert ====
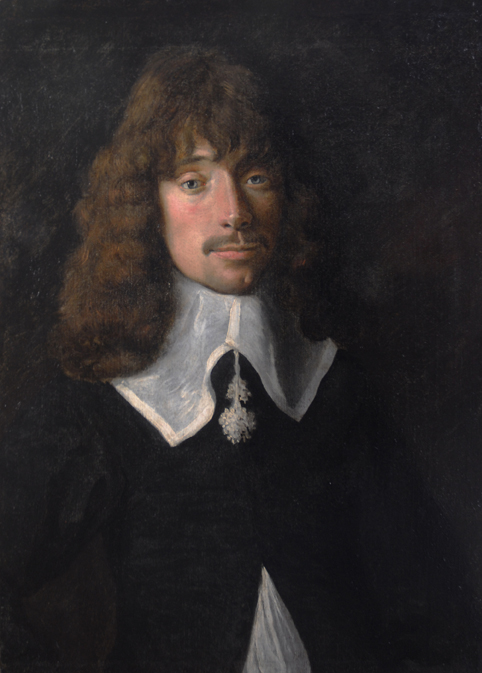
Leonard Calvert, the first governor of the Maryland colony. Maryland Archives, 1914. Painted by Florence Mackubin.

George Calvert died shortly before the Maryland charter received the royal seal; however, the King continued the grant to his eldest son and heir, Cecil. Cecil Calvert continued and expanded his father's plans. While their interest in providing a haven for fellow Catholics was genuine, it was imperative that the enterprise be profitable. Supporters in England of the Virginia colony opposed the Charter, as they had little interest in having a competing colony to the north. Rather than going to the colony himself, Baltimore stayed behind in England to deal with the political threat and sent his next younger brother Leonard in his stead. He never travelled to Maryland.

Leonard spent the rest of his life there, leading the settlers through many trials and tribulations, as well as to great successes in the farming and selling of tobacco back to Britain. Leonard, more than anyone else in his family, became the actual founder of colonial Maryland.

==== The Ark and the Dove ====
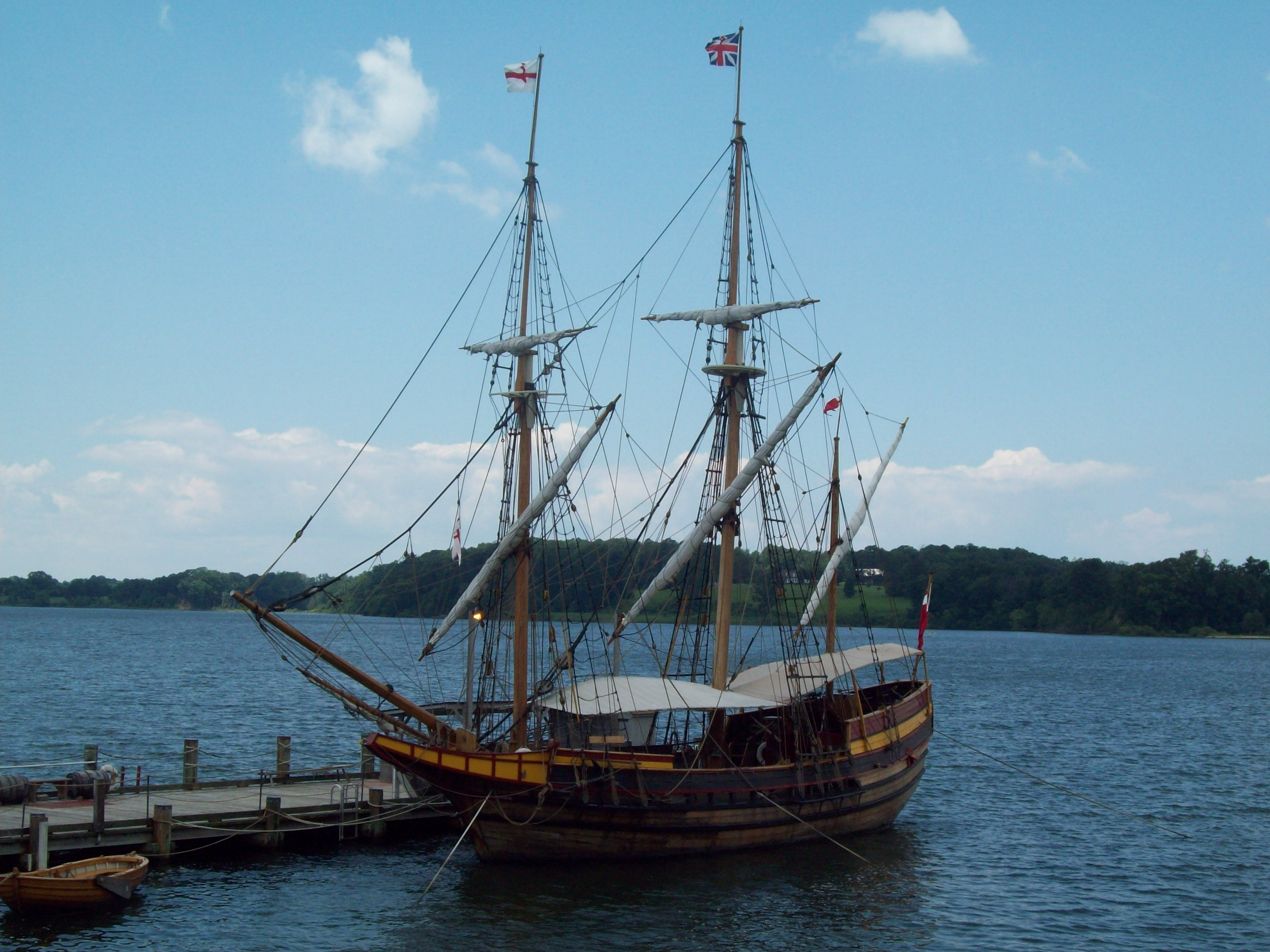
Full-sized working replica of the Dove, St. Mary's City Historic District,

Led by Leonard Calvert, in November 1633, two ships, The Ark and The Dove, set sail from the Isle of Wight, loaded with settlers, Jesuit missionaries and indentured servants. After a long, rough sea voyage with a stopover to resupply in Barbados, they arrived in what is now Maryland in March 1634. They made their first permanent settlement in what is now St. Mary's County, Maryland choosing to settle on a bluff overlooking the St. Mary's River, a relatively calm, tidal tributary near the mouth of the Potomac River where it empties into the Chesapeake Bay.

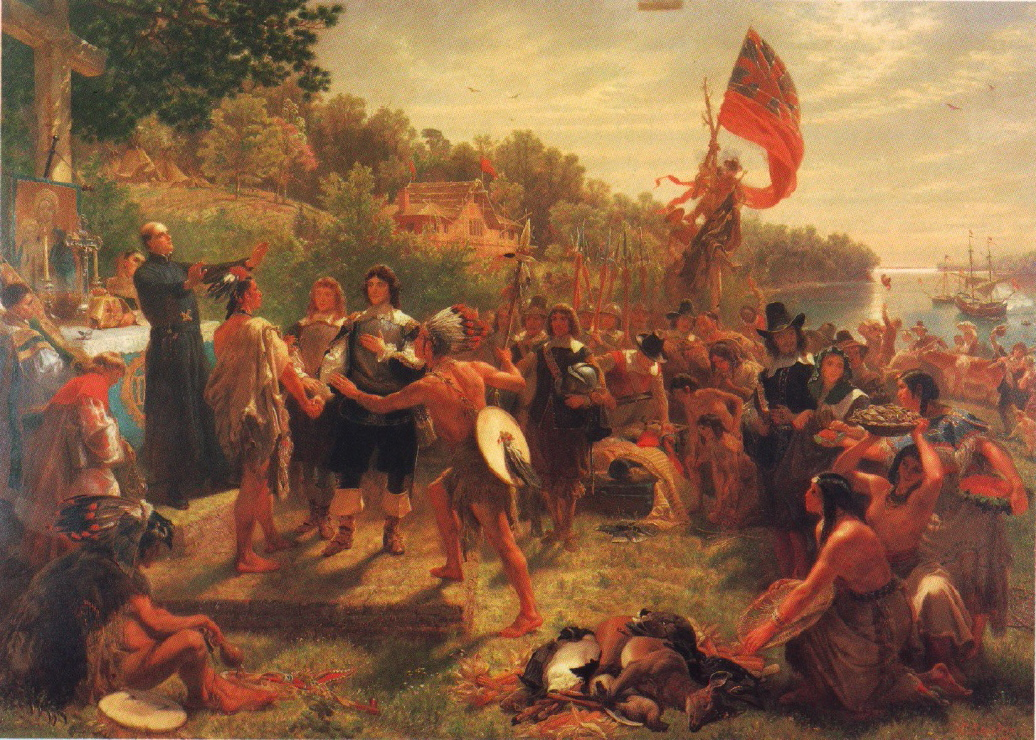
"The Founding of Maryland", 1634. Colonists are depicted meeting the Piscatawy Indians in St. Mary's City. Jesuit missionary, Father Andrew White, is believed to be on the left. In front of him the colonists' leader Leonard Calvert is clasping hands with the paramount chief of the Yaocomico.

The site had been occupied by members of the Yaocomico branch of the Piscataway Indian Nation, who had abandoned it as being vulnerable to attack by the Susquehanna. The settlers had with them a former Virginia colonist who was fluent in their language and they met quickly with the chief of the region. The Tayac Kittamaquund, paramount chief of the Piscataway Indian Nation, sold thirty miles of land there to the English newcomers. He wanted to develop them as allies and trading partners (especially because of their advanced technology, such as farming implements, metal-working, gunpowder and weapons, types of food and liquor, etc.). For some time, the Piscataway, their tributary tribes, and the English Marylanders coexisted peacefully.

==== Naming of St. Mary's City ====
St. Mary's City was officially named and founded on the site of the new settlement on March 27, 1634. "The name derived from the king's suggestion that the colony be named "Marianus" in honor of the queen, Henrietta Maria...They settled on "Terra Mariae". The original group of settlers numbered 300, mostly English and also some Irish. There may also have been at least one mixed race (African and European heritage) indentured servant who had been picked up on the way over in Barbados. There were also other indentured servants from England and Ireland.

The group was a mix of Catholics and Protestants during a time of religious persecution of Catholics in the British Isles. Leonard Calvert (1606–1647), himself a Roman Catholic, became the governor of the new colony and continued to lead the settlers. St. Mary's City became the capital of the new Maryland colony, and remained so for sixty one years until 1694.

==== 1634–1635: First Maryland legislative assembly ====
The first Maryland assembly, the first session of a non-native legislative body in Maryland, convened in 1634 and met periodically through 1635. The assembly quickly began to challenge a number of Cecil Calvert's edicts (sent in a letter along with the settlers), although they did not challenge his proprietorship over the new colony or his requirement for religious tolerance. Nevertheless, they pushed successfully for more personal freedoms and to adapt Calvert's edicts to the realities on the ground in the colony, which were not always the same as his expectations. For example, he wanted them to live in regimented fashion within the newly constructed fort in St. Mary's City but the greatest need perceived by the assembly was to allow for more spread-out farming. Leonard Calvert diplomatically lent support to the assembly's wishes in letters to his brother, and Cecil Calvert largely acceded.

Mathias de Sousa was a settler in the colony who was described in historical records by one witness as being "mulatto" (mixed African and European heritage, although sometimes this meant anyone who was dark skinned). He originally arrived in the new colony as an indentured servant working for the Jesuit missionaries who had come with the settlers. He later gained his freedom and went on to become an assemblyman, making him (possibly) the first person of African heritage to participate in a legislative body in North America.

==== Early mandates for religious tolerance ====
Instructions from George Calvert, the First Lord Baltimore, and the holder of the grant to the new Maryland Colony specified in 1633 that the new governor and all settlers were to practice religious tolerance. Upon the death of George Calvert, additional instructions written by his son Cecil Calvert, the new Lord Baltimore, also required religious tolerance in the new colony. They were sent along with his younger brother Leonard Calvert who accompanied the first settlers to Maryland in 1634 and who was appointed the first governor of the Maryland Colony, although they also encouraged Catholics to be reserved about expressions of their faith in order not to antagonize Protestants. These instructions became the first laws of Maryland.

This intent was carried forward and expanded upon by the majority of early settlers of the time, who upon forming their first legislative assembly, called "The Assembly of the Province of Maryland", passed the Maryland Toleration Act in 1649, further codifying the protection of religious freedom.

==== First colonial town ====
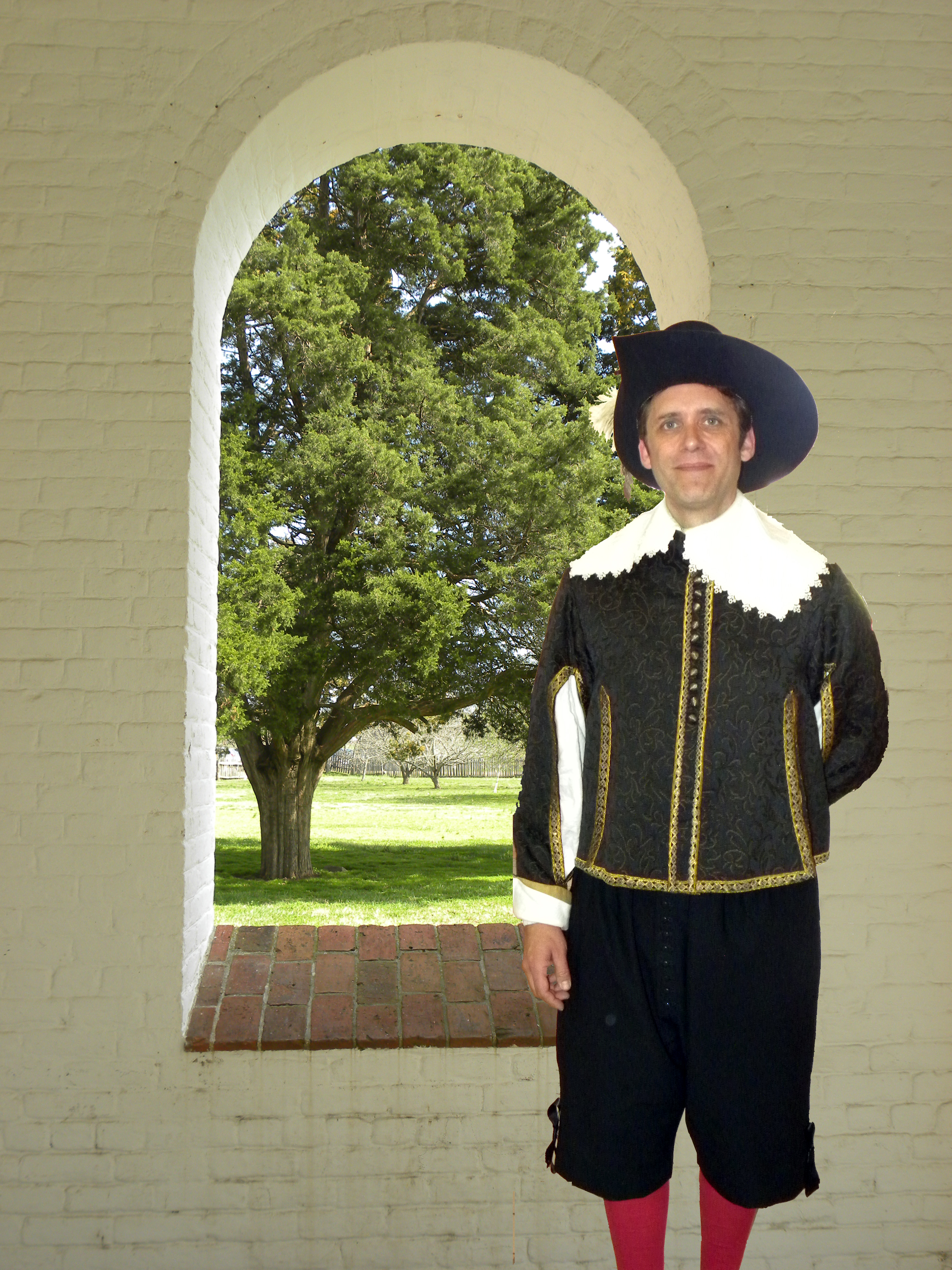
Period dressed living history actor playing the role of Leonard Calvert in the colonial State House in St. Mary's City. Photo by Kathleen Tyler Conklin.

The original St. Mary's settlement was laid out according to a Baroque town plan, with the settlers living closely in a town with church, stores and homes close by and outlying farms, fields, woods and orchards laid out in a grid or strips of land. However, most residents of St. Mary's City later preferred to live on their tobacco plantations in the surrounding countryside. The settlement was meant to be the capital of the new Maryland Colony and Province of Maryland.

=== Expansion ===
==== Tobacco successes and the expansion of slavery ====
St. Mary's City experienced an economic boom due to successful tobacco farming, which was the most important export commodity. Tobacco became an extremely valuable cash crop in the colony. This also drove the expansion of African chattel slavery. Older practices of allowing chattel slaves to gain freedom by converting to Catholicism or by eventually grandfathering indentured rights to them after many years of servitude were abolished. The character of the colony began to change more and more to a slave-based economy and slavery began to embed itself into the culture.

An increasing town population contributed to the desire for constructing public buildings, some of which were a state house, a Jesuit chapel, a jail, and an inn.

==== Growing religious tensions ====
During and after the English Civil War, fights between Protestants and Catholics developed in the colony. Often this tension went in long cycles, with extended periods where the tension was more repressed followed by acute periods where religious divisions would flare up, sometimes driving change in St. Mary's City and Maryland in the process.

==== Margaret Brent ====
Margaret Brent was a business-savvy and successful Catholic settler in St. Mary's City, who, contrary to the mores of the time that discouraged women from managing their own estates, although this was legal, insisted on managing her own business affairs. She had also traveled to the colony as a single, unmarried woman which was contrary to expectations of the time.

The law, in writing, had always been on Brent's side, but the common practices and beliefs of the day did not always guarantee enforcement, especially in the male-dominated frontier environment of the colonies, far away from the courts of England. As a woman, she had to defend her legal rights in order to be sure they were respected.

Brent defended her right to run her own estate in common law court before the assembly in St. Mary's City, making a spirited case, and won, making her the first woman in English North America to stand for herself in a court of law and before an assembly. She also demanded the right to vote in the assembly.

Brent also served as an attorney before the colonial court, mostly representing women of the colony. She is considered to have been very legally astute. Surviving records indicate that she pleaded at least 134 cases. Although she did not explicitly campaign for women's rights in general, she is credited for having done so implicitly.

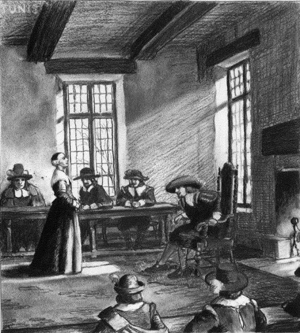
Margaret Brent making her case to the Maryland Assembly in 1648. 1934 black and white painting.

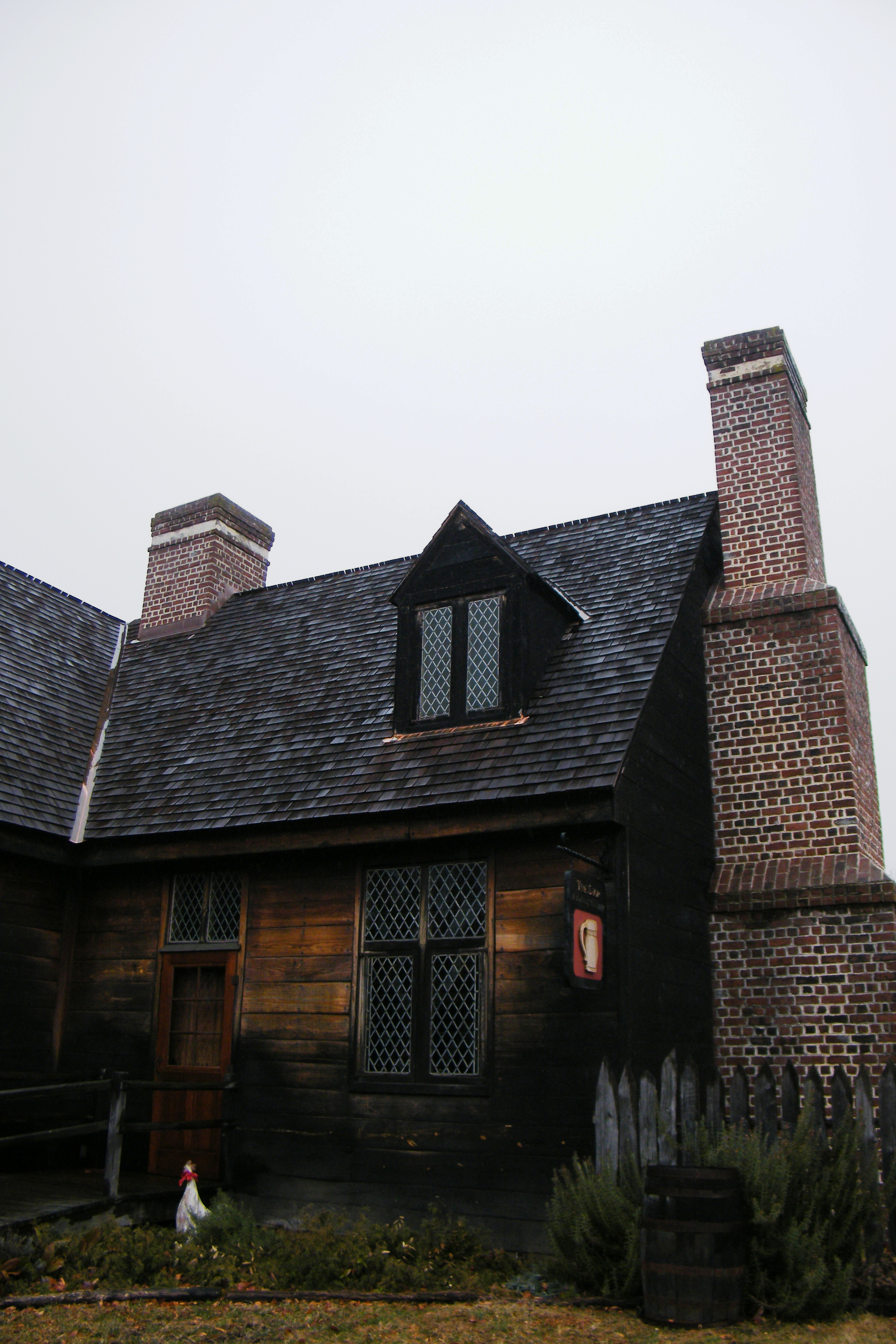
Reconstruction of the original Schweringen's Inn that originally stood in St. Mary's City. St. Mary's City Historic District, July 2009.

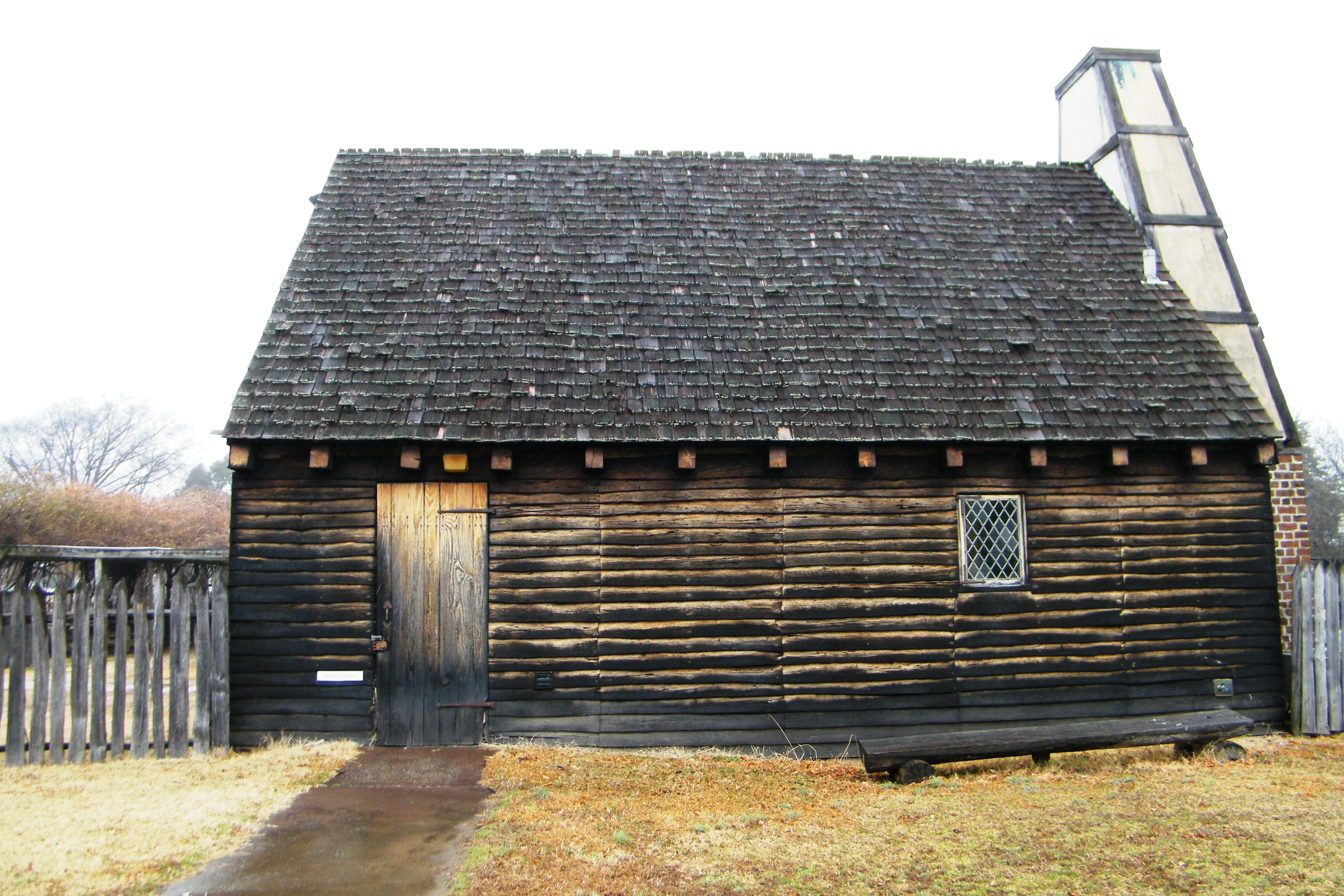
Reconstructed 17th-century planter's house typical of colonial St. Mary's City. St. Mary's City Historic District.

=== The Plundering Time ===
==== 1644–1646: Plundering Time ====
The violence stemming from the English civil war eventually spread to the colonies and a Protestant raiding party attacked St. Mary's City, driving off many settlers and burning several structures. After the attack there were only about 100 people still living in the town. The raiders took control of the city and added further fortifications.

The raiders plundered the homes of all the Catholic residents of the city who refused to renounce their faith and anyone who professed friendship to a Catholic. This would later be called the Plundering Time by the colonists.

==== 1647: Leonard Calvert retakes St. Mary's City ====
Leonard Calvert had spent a few years in exile from St. Mary's City but remained in the colonies. During this time he married Margaret Brent's sister which also brought Margaret Brent into the Calvert family as an in-law, advancing her in some ways to her advantage and in other ways to her detriment. Nearly two years later, Leonard Calvert managed to raise a militia and led an attack to retake St. Mary's City. They succeeded in driving off the Protestant militia and regained control of the town.

Then Calvert and his men carried out successful raids on Kent Island in the Chesapeake, which had become a stronghold of his foes, defeating the force there. At this point Calvert had the upper hand, although the threat still remained. However, within a year, Leonard Calvert became sick and died, creating a temporary power vacuum in the colony and also worryingly for the residents of St. Mary's City, leaving Calvert's militia, which had been protecting the city, unpaid.

==== Margaret Brent intervenes at a personal cost ====
Margaret Brent had been named by Leonard Calvert as the executor of his last will and testament, a very unusual designation for a woman of her time. She therefore handled the liquidation of Leonard Calvert's estate. However at the same time, Calvert's still-unpaid militia had become a security issue for St. Mary's City. Even if the militia simply disbanded due to the soldiers remaining unpaid, the city would then be vulnerable again to attack. And so Brent successfully petitioned the Maryland Assembly to grant her power of attorney over the holdings of Cecil Calvert, the Lord Baltimore, who was Leonard's brother living in England. She then used proceeds from liquidating some of these holdings to pay the militiamen.

Although her actions were later defended by the Maryland assembly as necessary in an emergency, a strain emerged between the Calvert family in England and Brent. Even though the assembly stated that Brent's actions may have in fact, helped to save the colony, the Calverts did not approve of Brent making a decision to spend money raised from Cecil Calvert's assets.

In defense of Brent, the Maryland Assembly issued the following proclamation about her:

...the Colony was safer in her hands than any man's in the Province,
and she rather deserves favor and thanks for her so much concerning
[herself] for the public safety.

However this did not sway Cecil Calvert.

This dispute also set off racial tensions between the Brent family and Cecil Calvert in England, because Brent's brother, who had also been in St. Mary's City, had married a Native American princess. In the same letter accusing Margaret Brent of mishandling Leonard Calvert's estate, Cecil Calvert also disparaged her brother, Giles Brent, for having married a Native American woman. At the end of the letter, Cecil Calvert ordered Brent and her brother and sisters to leave the Maryland Colony.

Although the assembly was largely supportive of Brent and largely took her side in the dispute with the surviving Calvert family in England, during this time she also petitioned for the right to vote in the assembly. However the assembly denied her that right because she was a woman. This was the first known attempt by a woman in English North America to gain the right to vote.

Despite appeals on her behalf by the Maryland assembly, Cecil Calvert had demanded by letter that she and her brother and sisters leave the Maryland colony. Consequently, Brent left the colony with her sister. They lived for a year on an island in the Potomac River and then moved to the Virginia colony. Other relatives moved directly to Virginia. Brent established a new estate there which she called "Peace". She eventually became very successful and stayed in Virginia for the rest of her life.

=== 1649: Maryland assembly ratifies the "Maryland Toleration Act" ===
The Maryland Toleration Act, crafted and passed by the reinstated Maryland assembly in St. Mary's City, was the first law codified to mandate religious tolerance among Christians of various sects (especially Catholics and Protestants). It was approved not only to carry out the wishes of George Calvert and his son and Cecil Calvert that the colony be a place of religious toleration between Catholics and Protestants. More urgently, the act, which applied to all of the Maryland Colony, sought to settle once and for all the religious divisions that had triggered the recent fighting. The assembly at the time was majority Protestant, and the aristocratic leadership, including the governorship of the colony was Catholic.

The act remained in effect for 40 years, and contributed to relative peace in the colony during that time.

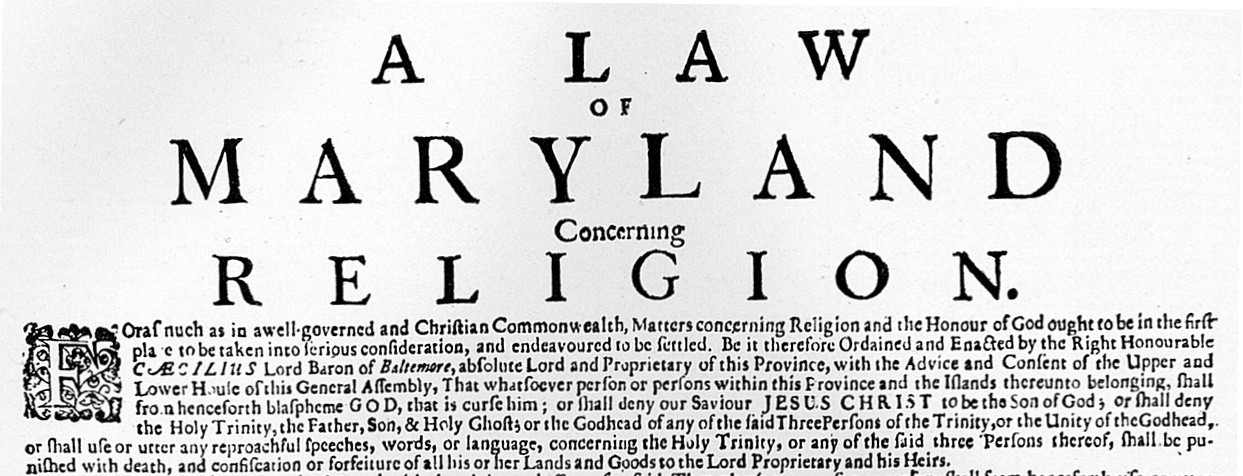
Photo of the beginning text of original Maryland Toleration Act, passed in 1649 by the Maryland Assembly in St. Mary's City. Author: Maryland Assembly, 1649. Maryland Archives.

=== Stagnation ===
==== 1660s: Problems in the tobacco economy ====
In the 1660s tobacco, which had long been a lucrative boom crop, began to experience price declines. This was likely due to increased production and competition in other colonies. The problem was then aggravated by Maryland planters cutting their tobacco product with other leaves in order to make up for the decrease in the price of a tobacco barrel. Although helpful in the very short run, in the longer run this cutting practice hurt the reputation of Maryland tobacco in England and further devalued the yearly tobacco crops. All of this began, in stages, to have a destabilizing effect on the Maryland Colony, which then further aggravated latent religious tensions between the majority Protestant planters and the Catholic aristocratic leadership.

All of this further intensified reliance on slavery in St. Mary's City, as plantation owners sought to eliminate the cost of paid labor in producing tobacco.

==== 1676: Original brick Maryland Statehouse constructed ====
In 1676, the original Maryland Statehouse, the home of the Maryland colonial assembly, was finished. The current reconstructed statehouse is not in the original location, which today lies under the churchyard of the adjacent Trinity Episcopal Church. After the original statehouse was dismantled in 1829, Trinity's horse-and-wagon stable was reportedly built out of the statehouse bricks.

==== 1678: First printing house in southern colonies opens in St. Mary's City ====
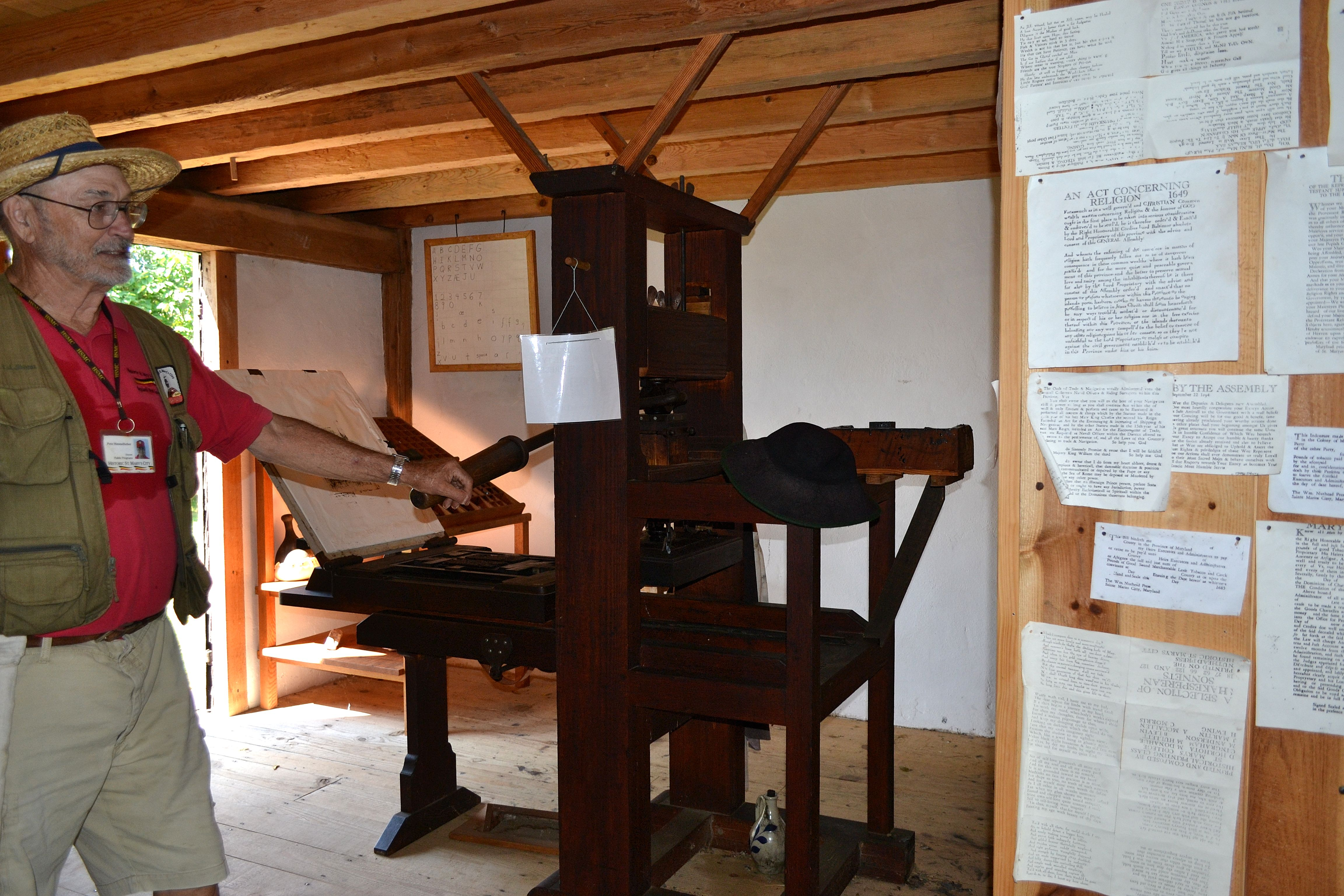
Working reproduction of the William Nuthead printing press, which was used in the first printing house in the Southern Colonies. This fully functional printing press is located in the Historic St. Mary's City living history area. Photo by J. Pitts, courtesy of the Southern Maryland Heritage Area Consortium.

Moving to St. Mary's City in 1678, William and Dinah Nuthead became the first printers in Maryland. While Dinah Nuthead was illiterate, she would often help her husband in operating the printing press. By copying the letters and the processes of her husband, Dinah was able to continue the printing business following her husband's death in 1695. After gaining a license to print from the colonial government, Dinah became the first female printer in the colony. When Dinah moved to Annapolis, Maryland in 1695, she was able to continue their printing business in the new location.

=== Decline ===
==== 1689: Watershed eruption of religious conflict ====
In 1689, about forty years after the passage of the Maryland Toleration Act, sectarian tensions between Protestants and Catholics became so great that Protestant settlers revolted against the Lords Baltimore in the Protestant uprising in Maryland. The English Crown took over the Maryland colony and appointed royal governors, replacing the Calverts.

Legally mandated religious tolerance was abolished, first by Royal decree and then later by a law passed by a now majority-Protestant state assembly, in the new capital in Annapolis.

==== 1690s: Catholics lost the right to vote, other anti-Catholic policies implemented ====
In 1692 Catholics in the Maryland Colony lost the right to vote. Catholics were also no longer allowed to worship in public and could only worship in their private homes. Laws were also passed limiting new Roman Catholic immigration to the colony.

Although a Catholic person's right to vote in Maryland would be reinstated by the state assembly some decades later, other forms of discrimination against Catholics would continue through most of the next century and would leave lasting religious tensions in Maryland felt all the way through to the election of John F. Kennedy just past the mid-20th century.

==== Relocation of Maryland Capital ====
The new Protestant Maryland governor Sir Francis Nicholson relocated the capital from St. Mary's City to the more central Annapolis (then called "Anne Arundel Town") in 1695. The colonial statehouse in St. Mary's was turned into a Protestant church the same year.

In 1695 St. Peters freehold, the former home of Maryland governors in St. Mary's City, was destroyed in an explosion. Whether this was an intentional act or an accident is not known, as a large gunpowder magazine had been stored in its basement. The freehold had briefly been the home of the new Protestant Governor Francis Nicholson until he ordered the colonial capital moved to Annapolis. Prior to this the freehold had been the home of Philip Calvert, the former Catholic Governor of the Maryland colony and Cecil Calvert's half-brother until his death in 1682.

==== Anti-Catholic policies and discrimination in the 18th century ====
During the 18th century, Catholics became a persecuted minority group in Maryland, including St. Mary's county. Catholics were denied the right to serve in the militia, taxed double when money had to be raised for the military, and continued to be discouraged from immigrating. Wealthy Catholics often became crypto-Catholics (practicing their religion in secret and sending their children abroad to get Catholic educations), but poor Catholics could not afford this and were more vulnerable to discrimination practices. Consequently, over the generations, many converted to Protestantism in order to avoid discrimination. By the late 18th century, the Catholic population had dropped to 9%.

==== Abandonment of the city ====
With the seat of government gone, the town lost its reason to exist. Remaining inhabitants were mostly farmers. The former town center was converted to agricultural land, and archaeological remains from the colonial town were undisturbed in the ground.

=== 1700–1865: Antebellum slave plantation era ===
==== Early 18th century: Consolidation of farms ====
The small remaining farms in St. Mary's City were consolidated into a large antebellum-style slave plantation by the Brome-Howard family, which operated through a majority of the 19th century. The main plantation house was built over the ruins of one of the Calvert residences.

==== Civil War ====
During the Civil War, Union troops occupied St. Mary's County, which like a large part of Maryland at the time, had Southern sympathies. Piers and wharfs in St. Mary's County were burned by Union forces in order to stop trade with the confederacy which was only across the Potomac River. Brome's Wharf in St. Mary's City was also burned, as it was a part of what was by then the Brome-Howard Plantation, owned by Doctor Brome, a slave-owner and a likely confederate sympathizer. There is archeological evidence that the Union Army may have occupied the plantation for some time. Records show that Brome later complained that Union troops had damaged his piano while ransacking the main plantation house.

Records show that one quarter of the 66 people living under slavery at Doctor Brome's plantation in St. Mary's City escaped during the Civil War and at least two of them then joined the Union Army. Even before slavery was legally abolished, the Union Army had a policy allowing enslaved men to gain their freedom if they became Union soldiers. Other records show that the total number of people living under slavery there during this time was 59.

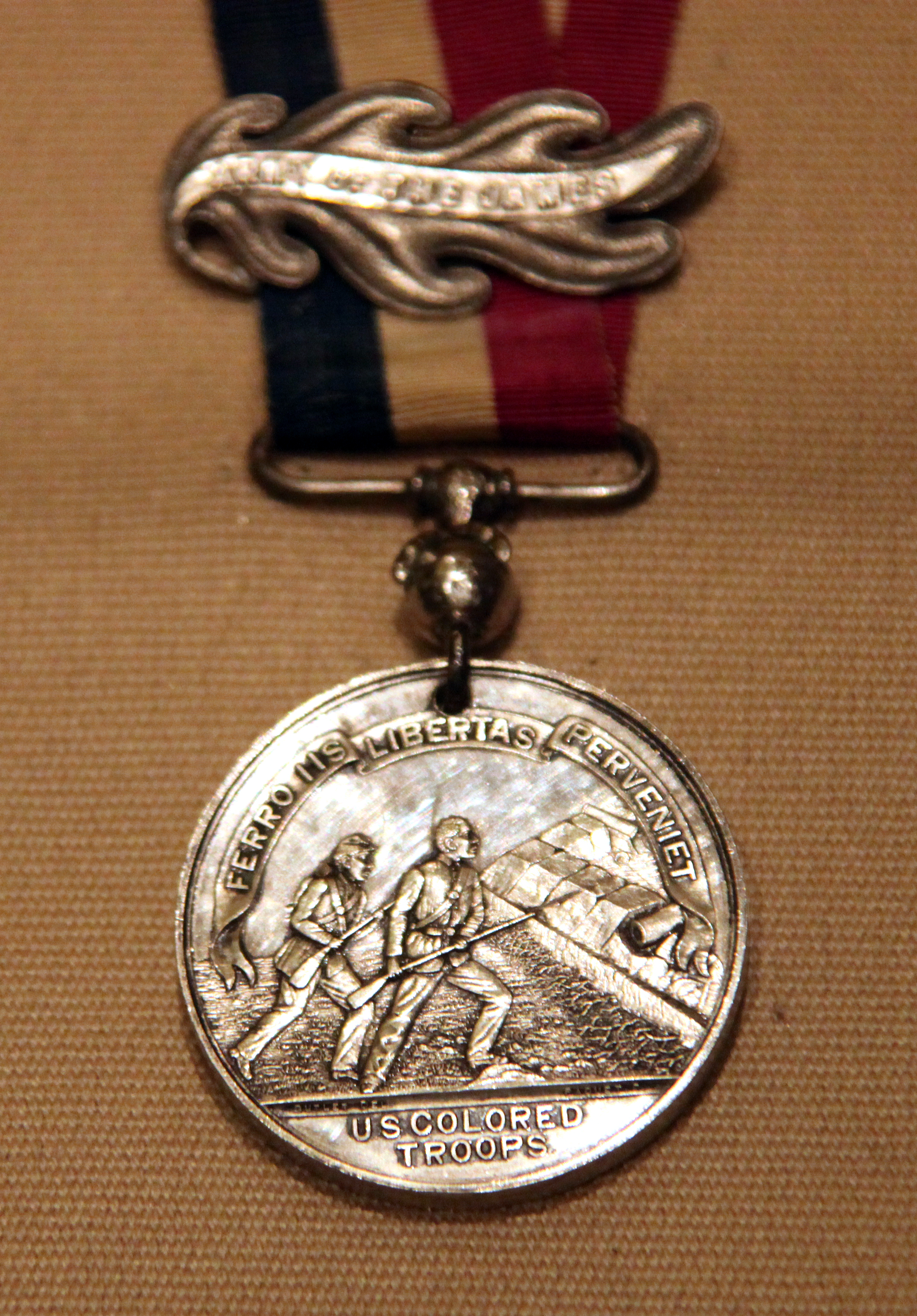
Medal issued for valor in the Battle of Chaffin's Farm (also known as the "Battle of New Market Heights") to members of the 38th United States Colored Infantry Regiment in which Alexander Gough, William Gross, William H. Barnes and James H. Harris served. It was the specific actions of the 38th USCT in this battle that inspired Maj. Gen. Benjamin Butler to order the creation of this medal. Barnes and Harris also received the Medal of Honor. Circa 1865 - Smithsonian Museum of American History.

Two men who had escaped slavery from the St. Mary's City area, Alexander Gough and William Gross, joined the famed 38th United States Colored Infantry Regiment of the Union Army, which won unit citations for valor in the Battle of Chaffin's Farm (also known as the "Battle of New Market Heights") in the American Civil War. Gough is known to have survived the war and lived the rest of his life in Baltimore. Two other African American men from the area, William H. Barnes and James H. Harris both from Great Mills (which is just to the north of St. Mary's City), who had been free tenant farmers before the war, also served in the same regiment. Harris and Barnes each received the Medal of Honor for their actions in the Battle of Chaffin's Farm. There is evidence suggesting that additional slaves from the Brome plantation fought in the war as well. In total, over 700 African Americans from St. Mary's County served in the Union Army during the Civil War.

The United States Colored Troops Memorial Statue, in Lexington Park, Maryland, seven miles north of St. Mary's City, honors and memorializes African American soldiers from St. Mary's County, including the men of the 38th United States Colored Troops Regiment, who served as soldiers or sailors in the Union cause during the American Civil War. An educational plaque at the site specifically mentions Barnes and Harris and how they received the Medal of Honor.

==== Post-Civil War farming ====
The Civil War ended slavery on the plantation and the area remained mostly under a large farm, worked by tenant farmers and owned by descendants of the original owners until the 20th century. By the mid-20th century, few 17th-century buildings still stood. The town center site appeared to be farmland with the exception of a few private residences, and also after 1840, a slowly expanding female seminary school that began with just a small part of the total area.

==== Writings about the decline of St. Mary's City ====
In 1838 the novel Rob of the Bowl was published; it was a story about the struggle for religious tolerance in Maryland and was written by John Pendleton Kennedy, and was set in St. Mary's City and also neighboring St. Inigoes, Maryland. The book opens with a poem that Kennedy selected as a re-attribution to describe St. Mary's City long after its abandonment as the capital of Maryland.

This also refers to part of the 19th-century history and mythology of St. Mary's City (in the State of Maryland) as a place where great things happened (such as the founding of the Colonial Government of Maryland and the birthplace of religious freedom in the United States) but which eventually became a ghost town.

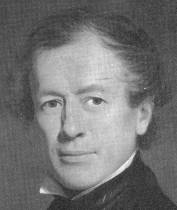
John Pendleton Kennedy, author of the 1838 novel Rob of the Bowl. Circa 1800s.

No more thy glassy brook reflects the day,

But choked with sedges, works its weedy way;
Along thy glades a solitary guest,
The hollow-sounding bittern guards its nest;
Amidst thy desert walks the lapwing flies,
And tires their echoes with unvaried cries.
Sunk are thy bowers in shapeless ruin all,

And the long grass o'ertops the mould'ring wall

The Deserted Village

=== St. Mary's City's resurgence ===
==== 1840: Establishment of St. Mary's Female Seminary ====
The book Rob of the Bowl tells a somewhat fictionalized story of the original St. Mary's City. The author, after the book became popular, publicly lamented that there was no monument to memorialize the original St. Mary's City and what happened there.

A few years later, in 1840, a women's nondenominational seminary high school was established on the grounds of old St. Mary's City, in response to Kennedy's call for a monument; its founders described it as a "living monument" to the beginnings of religious tolerance and established it to meet the educational needs of young women in the county and the state. The school was called St. Mary's Seminary.

The school was intentionally made nondenominational, to honor, promote and memorialize religious tolerance, and also to help heal Protestant-Catholic tensions that still haunted St. Mary's County at the time.

The name was changed to St. Mary's Female Seminary, to clarify the school's already existing female student-only mission.

==== Early 1900s ====
In 1926, the former St. Mary's women's Catholic seminary school (a boarding high school within the proper of old St. Mary's City that was founded in 1840) was expanded to add a two-year seminary female junior college, and renamed to "St. Mary’s Female Seminary-Junior College", and then during 1932–1937, stopped teaching 9th and 10th grades, so it could instead focus on just four levels: 11th ("freshman") and 12th grade ("sophomore"), forming the "Lower Division", and then "juniors" and "seniors" in the junior college known as the "Upper Division".

Through an act of the Maryland Legislature, St. Mary's gender limitation was removed, and the word "female" was consequently dropped from the school's name. However, although males may enroll, they are not offered housing. The name of the school was changed to St. Mary's Seminary Junior College.

The St. Mary's City Commission was chartered in 1966 by the State Assembly of Maryland and the Governor, Millard Tawes. The charter created the commission as "a new, independent state agency" reporting directly to the Governor of Maryland "to preserve, develop and maintain" St. Mary's City as a state "monument", and also to oversee ongoing archeological work.

The Junior College was ordered to be expanded to a four-year institution in 1966 (effective in 1968) and renamed "St. Mary's College of Maryland". It was chartered as a four-year public liberal arts college. Its mission was to provide a liberal arts college in the public sector to students who could not afford to attend elite private colleges. Reorganization was completed in 1967.

==== 1969: St. Mary's City declared a National Landmark ====
St. Mary's was declared a National Historic Landmark in 1969.

The plan "recommends acquisition of 1200 acres" and suggests a museum, visitor center, working tobacco farm, public transportation, and reconstruction of the Ark and Dove as first steps in the reconstruction of the historic city.

==== 1976: World premiere of Wings of the Morning, by Kermit Hunter ====
Commissioned to celebrate the founding of St. Mary's City, Hunter's outdoor drama prominently featured the characters of Leonard Calvert, William Claiborne, Ann Arundel, Richard Ingel, Mathias de Sousa and others, and launched the career of two-time Academy Award winner, Denzel Washington, who made his stage debut as DeSousa. Also in the cast were Tony winner Debra Monk as Ann Arundel), and actor/writer/director Jackson Heath as Ingel. On July 4, 1976, a Washington Post review of the play was read aloud on the floor of Congress and permanently entered in the Congressional Record.

==== 1980–present ====
After years of exploratory test digs and historical detective work, and with the possible original key town locations having been narrowed down, archeological dig activity was increased significantly in a determined effort to finish uncovering the original layout of the colonial settlement.

In 1984, Lord Baltimore's World was a large-scale, months-long colonial reenactment that was staffed by professional actors and also included live Shakespearean theater. It occurred within St. Mary's City proper and celebrated the 350th anniversary of the arrival of Maryland's first colonists.

After four years of intensified archeological digging, most of the original town layout had been discovered. It had been originally expected that the layout would be chaotic, but instead it was revealed that the town was actually carefully planned in a Baroque style, similar to Williamsburg, Virginia and Annapolis, Maryland. Old St. Mary's City, Annapolis and Williamsburg are the only three towns in North America planned and built in a Baroque layout.

The St. Mary's City Commission, which had evolved through a variety of roles and slight name variations assigned to its historical research, reconstruction and preservation charter, was assigned a new name in 1991 by the State of Maryland: the Historic St. Mary's Commission. This commission still has administrative authority over about half of St. Mary's City; it is responsible for the preservation of more than 800 acres of land and 3 miles of shoreline.

=== Present ===
Historic St. Mary's City is now a significant tourist attraction in the state of Maryland, visited by approximately 20,000 students per year, in addition to approximately 25,000 other tourists per year (a rough yearly total of 45,000 people). Expansion and development of the historic area continues, including reconstruction and replica creation of additional period sites. Historic St. Mary's City is operated as an outdoor living history museum, and includes costumed actors portraying colonial-era life, museum exhibitions, and numerous reconstructed buildings.

== Archaeological research in St. Mary's City ==
The National Park Service has described St. Mary's City as "probably the most intact 17th-century English town surviving in our nation represented entirely by archaeological resources." Numerous archaeological digs and research projects continue in St. Mary's City. In the last 30 years, there have been more than 200 archaeological digs in the city.

=== First excavations ===
After explorations by Henry Chandlee Forman in the 1940s, excavations began in 1971 with the creation of the St. Mary's City Historic Commission, a state institution tasked with discovering and preserving archaeological remains in St. Mary's City, establishing a museum on the site, and conducting related historical research. Since then, much of the original colonial St. Mary's City has been found. The Historic St. Mary's City Commission continues to excavate the area today.

=== The Historical Archaeology Field School ===
In conjunction with St. Mary's College of Maryland, the Historic St. Mary's Commission (formerly the "St. Mary's City Commission") runs the Historic Archeological Field School every summer that is attended by students from all over the United States and other countries as well. Many of its graduates now hold prominent positions in the field. The students not only study, but also work in many of the active archeological dig sites in St. Mary's City. Providing extensive hands-on experience, the school teaches all aspects of professional archeological work, including working in real archeological digs, analyzing and conserving artifacts, as well as cataloging, archiving and related historical research. The school has been in existence for more than 40 years.

=== Current work ===
St. Mary's City has numerous active archeological dig sites, focusing on precolonial, colonial and antebellum (slavery era) history.

=== Notable discoveries ===
Some important archeological discoveries in St. Mary's City include:

- The site of the first printing house in the Southern colonies; a quantity of lead print type (for printing words), indicating that the site where it was found was the documented William Nuthead Printing House
- A 1645 fort with a surrounding moat, claimed to be the only structural remains of the English Civil War in the American Colonies
- Discovery of the St. John's house/freehold, where Maryland's citizen government was instituted
- Façon de Venise glassware
- A set of Kütahya ceramics, one of only two known examples found in the United States
- 19th-century slave quarters from St. Mary's City's later plantation period
- Three 17th-century lead coffins. One of these is suspected of being the coffin of the former colonial chancellor and also judge, Philip Calvert.
- The foundation of a Jesuit chapel
- Discovery of the site of St. Peters Freehold, the former home of Maryland Chancellor Philip Calvert. St. Peters freehold was destroyed in a violent explosion in 1695 when 900 pounds of gunpowder stored in its cellar were set off. Whether the explosion was intentional or an accident is unknown. The discovery was made by a team of visiting British scientists, and was featured in a British Time Team documentary that aired on The Learning Channel.
- Garret Van Sweringen's Inn, a 17th-century inn founded by Garret Van Sweringen an Innkeeper and a leader in St. Mary's City's development
- Extensive artifacts from successive Native American occupations
- The 18th-century house of merchant and planter John Hicks, with an extensive ceramic assemblage
- Former slaves quarters and living area discovered on current campus grounds of St. Mary's College of Maryland, monument in honor of enslaved people erected by college

These findings come along with thousands of artifacts and bone fragments that have been cataloged and processed into St. Mary's City historical museums and storage archives. These artifacts continue to be analyzed, and continue to advance period research in various fields.

=== St. Mary's Fort ===
In late 2019, St. Mary's Fort was unearthed to be later revealed in March 2021. The structure was built in 1634 by the first English colonists, to be their fourth colony in the New World after Jamestown (1607), Plymouth (1620), and Massachusetts Bay (1630). Moreover, a silver coin was discovered there, dated back to the reign of King Charles I.

== See also ==
- History of Maryland
- Piscataway tribe, a Native American people in St. Mary's City prior to the arrival of British colonists
- Economic history of Colonial Maryland
- History of slavery in Maryland
- Freedom of religion in the United States
- Plundering Time
- Battle of the Severn
- List of National Historic Landmarks in Maryland
- National Register of Historic Places listings in St. Mary's County, Maryland

== Sources ==
- Curran, Robert Emmett. Papist Devils: Catholics in British America, CUA Press, 2014, ISBN 9780813225838
- King, Julia A., Archaeology, Narrative, and the Politics of the Past: The View from Southern Maryland, Univ. of Tennessee Press, 2012, ISBN 1572338881
