= William Barnes (disambiguation) =

William Barnes (1801–1886) was an English writer, poet, minister, and philologist.

William Barnes may also refer to:

== Politics ==
- William Barnes (died 1558), MP for East Grinstead, Marlborough, Taunton and Downton
- William Barnes (died 1559), MP for Wigan
- William Barnes (labour leader) (1827–1918), New Zealand blacksmith and labour reformer
- William D. Barnes (1856–1927), American politician
- William D. Barnes (Florida), Florida Comptroller (1881–1890)
- William H. Barnes (jurist) (1843–1904), American politician and Arizona Territorial judge
- William H. Barnes (Wisconsin politician) (1885–1973), American politician
- William Barnes Jr. (1866–1930), American journalist and politician
- William Barnes Sr. (1824–1913), American attorney and Republican Party leader
- William G. Barnes, American politician, Democratic candidate in the 2010 United States Senate election in Alabama

== Sports ==
- Bill Barnes (American football) (1917–2009), American college football coach
- Bill Barnes (pitcher) (1919–1996), Negro league baseball player
- Bill Barnes (outfielder) (1858–1945), American baseball player
- Bill Barnes (footballer) (born 1939), Scottish footballer
- Billy Barnes (footballer) (William Edwin Barnes, 1879–1962), English footballer
- Billy Barnes (cricketer) (1852–1899), English cricketer
- William Barnes (boxer) (1924–2006), Irish Olympic boxer
- William Barnes (sport shooter) (1876–1925), Canadian Olympic sport shooter

== Others ==
- Will Toledo, born William Barnes, lead singer of American rock band Car Seat Headrest
- William H. Barnes (Medal of Honor) (c. 1840–1866), Union Army soldier
- William Sullivan Barnes (1841–1912), Canadian Unitarian minister
- William Thomas Barnes (1894–1920), English flying ace of World War I
- William Barnes (entomologist) (1860–1930), American physician and collector of butterflies and moths
- William Emery Barnes (1859–1939), English Anglican theologian
- Bill Barnes (United Methodist minister) (1931–2017), American pastor
- Will C. Barnes (1858–1936), U.S. Army private and Medal of Honor recipient

== See also ==
- Bill Barnes (disambiguation)
- Billy Barnes (disambiguation)
- William Barne (disambiguation)
