= Bill Barnes =

Bill Barnes is the name of:

- Bill Barnes (American football) (1917–2009), American college football coach
- Bill Barnes (pitcher) (1919–1996), Negro league baseball player
- Bill Barnes (outfielder) (1858–1945), American baseball player
- Bill Barnes (footballer) (born 1939), Scottish footballer
- Bill Barnes (United Methodist minister) (1931–2017), American pastor

== See also ==
- Billy Barnes (cricketer) (1852–1899), English cricketer
- William Barnes (disambiguation)
