= James Heaton =

American legislator (died 1879)

James Heaton (November 5, 1846 – July 12, 1879) was a state legislator in North Carolina. He represented New Hanover County in the North Carolina House of Representatives in 1872.

He represented New Hanover County in 1870. He was one of the legislators found guilty of "Staying an Election". He was pardoned by governor Curtis H. Brogden.

He lived in Wilmington. In 1874, he was involved on racially charged disturbances in Wilmington.

He attended the Republican National Convention in Cincinnati in 1876 with fellow delegates James H. Harris and Thomas Powers.

In 1879, Heaton killed Mary Ratcliff, a 28-to-30-year-old mulatto woman, then himself in a murder-suicide.
