= William Barne =

William Barne may refer to:

- William Barnes (died 1558), or William Barne, English Member of Parliament (MP)
- William Barne (died 1562), or William Berners, English MP
- William Barne (died 1619), English MP

== See also ==
- William Barnes (disambiguation)
