= Economic history of Colonial Maryland =

Province of Maryland's (Colonial Maryland) economic history

Maryland's colonial economic history is marked by a heavy reliance on the tobacco crop. Though it would remain a slave state until the end of the Civil War, it was not until the 1700s that labor began to drive agricultural production in the colony. The colonial-era would also see Maryland begin early industrialization and urbanization, experiment with different monetary systems, and make efforts to diversify its economy.

Landing initially on St. Clement's Island on March 25, 1634, Maryland's first settlers would establish their colony around St. Mary's City. Where they successfully grew enough food to prevent starvation and to export back to Britain. In these early days, the majority of settlers were indentured servants. Though Lord Baltimore initially hoped to establish a "landholding aristocracy" through the provision of affordable land, the colony's land system promoted the creation of a large number of small farms. Many were owned by former indentured servants. By the late 1600s, more than two-thirds of farmers in the colony held estates worth less than £100. They practiced a form of agriculture that employed twenty-year crop rotations and that preserved the viability of the land but limited economies of scale.

== Depression and regulation (1640s to 1660s) ==
In the period following Oliver Cromwell's fall in England, the colony grew and transitioned to a slave economy. It saw the beginnings of industry and urbanization.

At the turn of the eighteenth century, King William's War (1689–1697) and Queen Anne's War (1702–1714) brought Maryland into depression again as European demand for tobacco decreased sharply. As a result, many poorer farmers began to diversify their efforts, adding cattle and grain to their fields and adopting crafts. Despite the economic uncertainty, indentured servants arrived in large numbers until the end of the seventeenth century. With the dawn of the 1700s, however, farmers shifted to slave labor for their fields. Between 1704 and 1720, the slave population shot from 4,475 to 25,000.

During this period, the slave population was increasingly concentrated in estates with more than ten slaves. Some historians consider this transition to a slave economy to be the start of greater social stratification in the colony, as wealthier Marylanders were then able to increase their farms' productivity through the increasing returns that slave labor enabled.

Other changes were afoot, too. In the 1730s, farmers began to smelt iron near Annapolis. In Annapolis itself, then the largest city in the colony, the urban population doubled between 1715 and 1740. In this era of transition, the colony again fell into economic depression in the 1730s.

== Towards the Revolution (1740s to 1770s) ==
In the final decades of the colonial period, the Maryland economy increasingly diversified from its tobacco colony roots. Monetary policy evolved, as well.

Following the French and Indian War, grain exports reached one-third of the level of tobacco production. Still, the Maryland wheat trade suffered in the 1760s due to crown restrictions on shipping to Britain. Maryland wheat was shipped instead to continental Europe, where it competed against local producers. To supplement their income, large planters increasingly turned to money lending and renting land to tenant farmers. All the while, tobacco production continued to increase. In 1740s, the colony averaged around 20 million pounds per year. By the 1760s, Maryland produced 25 million pounds per year.

English law initially forbade either the export of British currency or the establishment of colonial mints. As a result, currency shortages were frequent in Maryland and merchants often paid British firms with bills of exchange. In fact, until legislative action in 1747, tobacco was a frequently used internal currency. Thereafter, paper money increasingly replaced the barter system. Unlike most colonial currencies, which were backed by future tax receipts or mortgages on land or metals, Maryland's paper money was backed by a sinking fund in the Bank of England that would periodically convert a portion of its holdings to sterling.
