= James H. Harris =

American soldier (1828–1898)

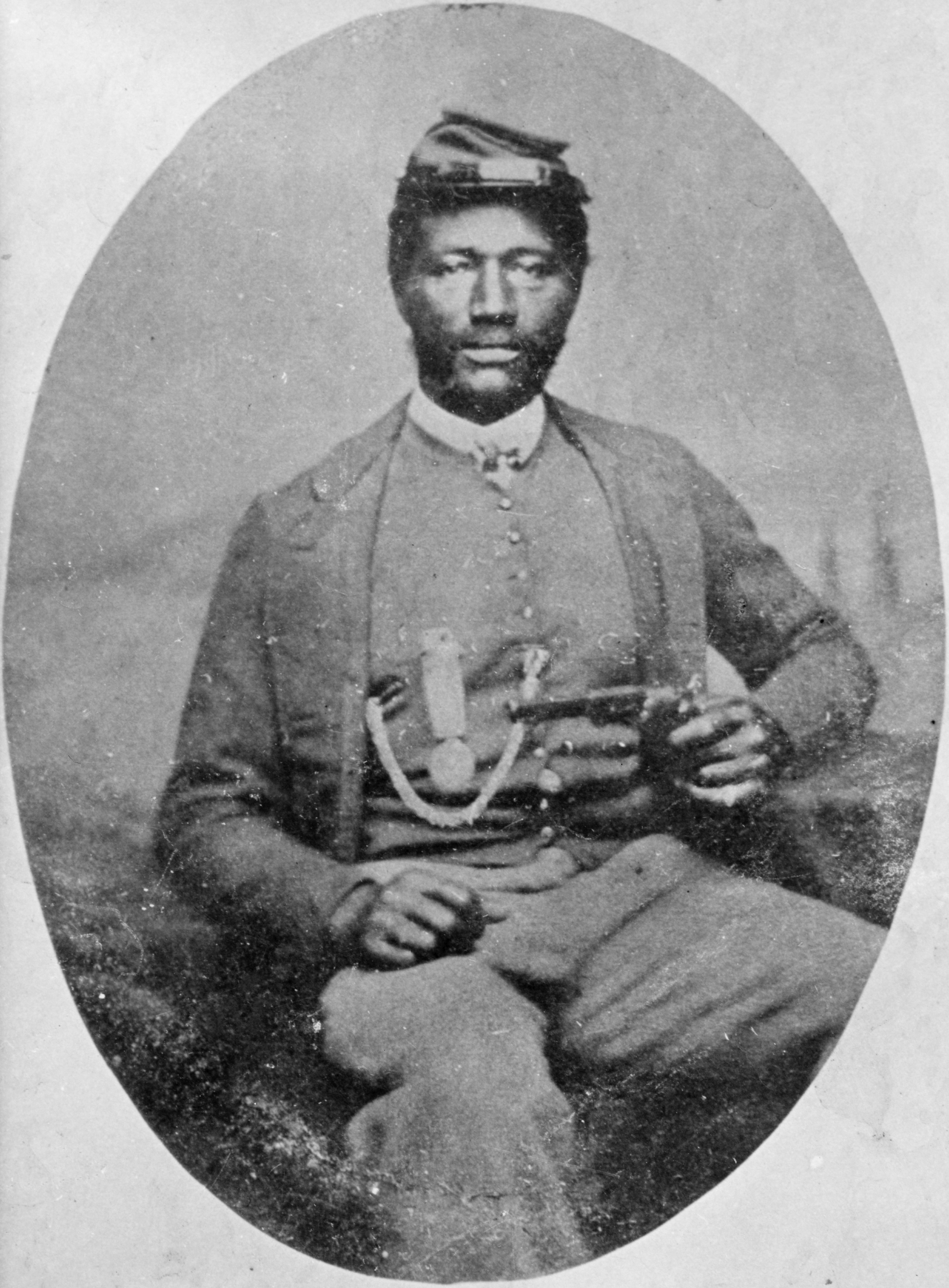
- Sergeant James H. Harris
- Born: 1828; Saint Mary's County, Maryland, US
- Died: January 28, 1898 (aged 69–70)
- Burial place: Arlington National Cemetery
- Military career
- Allegiance: United States; Union
- Branch: United States Army; Union Army
- Service years: 1864–1867
- Rank: Sergeant
- Units: Company B, 38th Regiment United States Colored Troops
- Conflicts: American Civil War • Battle of Chaffin's Farm
- Awards: Medal of Honor

James H. Harris (1828 – January 28, 1898) was an African American soldier in the Union Army during the American Civil War. He earned the highest military decoration in the United States—the Medal of Honor—for his actions at the Battle of Chaffin's Farm.

== Biography ==
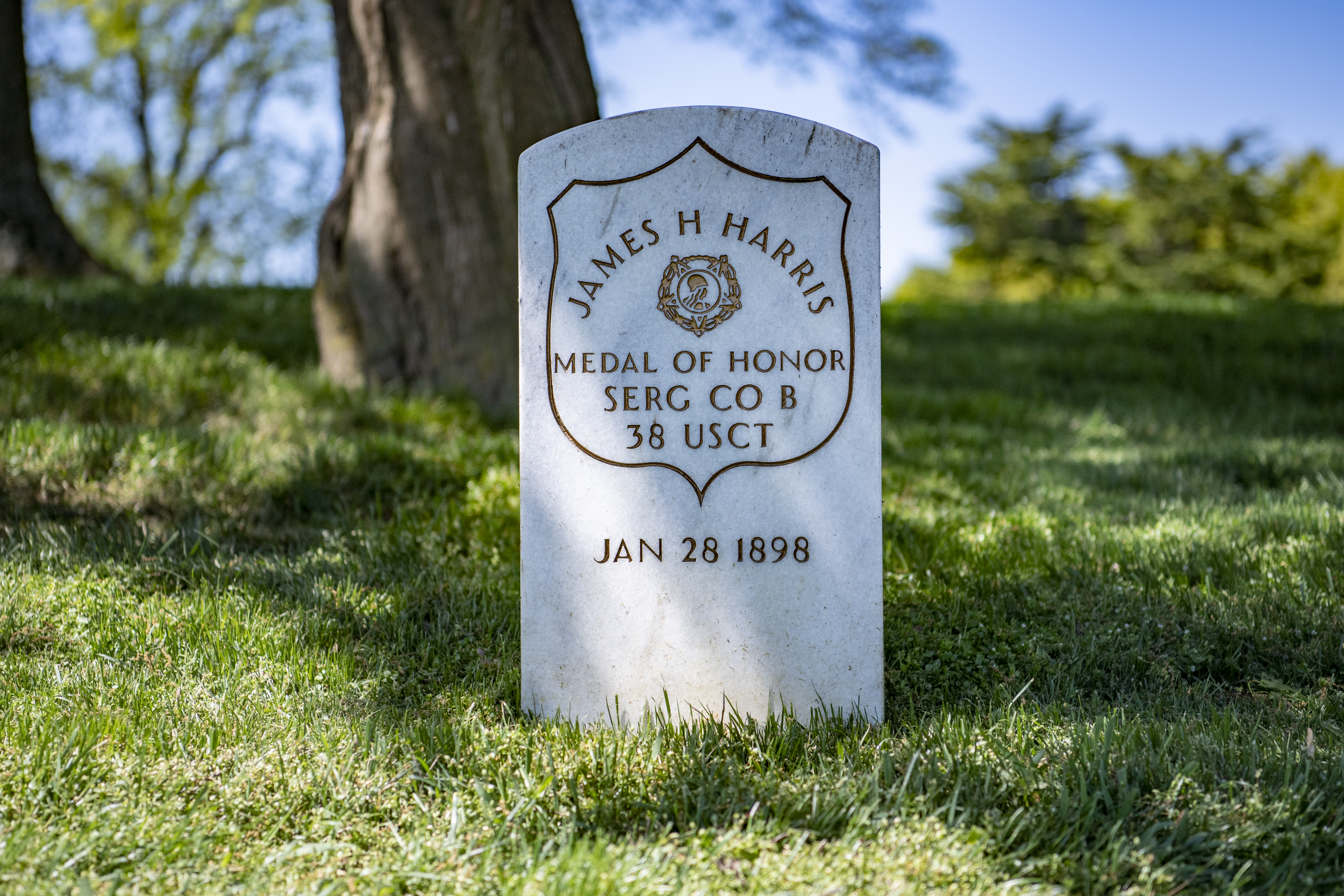
Grave at Arlington National Cemetery

Born in Saint Mary's County, Maryland, Harris worked as a farmer before joining the U.S. Army from Great Mills at age 36. He enlisted on February 14, 1864, as a private in Company B of the 38th United States Colored Troops regiment. He was promoted to corporal five months later, on July 25, and to sergeant two months after that, on September 10.

At the Battle of Chaffin's Farm, on September 29, 1864, Harris' regiment was among a division of black troops assigned to attack the center of the Confederate defenses at New Market Heights. The defenses consisted of two lines of abatis and one line of palisades manned by Brigadier General John Gregg's Texas Brigade. The attack was met with intense Confederate fire; over fifty percent of the black troops were killed, captured, or wounded. The initial attack stalled at the abatis, but when a renewed effort began, Harris and two other men of the 38th USCT, Private William H. Barnes and Sergeant Edward Ratcliff, ran at the head of the assault. Being the first to breach the defenses, the three soldiers engaged the Confederates in hand-to-hand combat. They were soon joined by the remainder of their division, and the Confederate force was routed.

Over seven years later, on February 18, 1874, he was issued the Medal of Honor for "[g]allantry in the assault" at Chaffin's Farm. Harris died at the approximate age of 69 and was buried at Arlington National Cemetery in Arlington County, Virginia.

== Medal of Honor citation ==
Rank and organization: Sergeant, Company B, 38th U.S. Colored Troops. Place and date: At New Market Heights, Va., September 29, 1864. Entered service at:------. Birth: St. Marys County, Md. Date of issue: February 18, 1874.

Citation:

Gallantry in the assault.

== United States Colored Troops Memorial Statue ==
James H. Harris is specifically honored and memorialized by the United States Colored Troops Memorial Statue in Lexington Park, Maryland (in St. Mary's County, where he grew up and also worked as a farmer). The informational kiosk at the memorial mentions him specifically.

== See also ==
- List of American Civil War Medal of Honor recipients: G–L
- List of African American Medal of Honor recipients
- Battle of Chaffin's Farm
- 38th Regiment United States Colored Troops
- United States Colored Troops
