= Billy Barnes =

Billy Barnes may refer to:

- Billy Barnes (composer) (1927–2012), American composer
- Billy Barnes (cricketer) (1852–1899), English cricketer
- Billy Barnes (footballer) (1879–1962), English footballer
- Billy Ray Barnes (born 1935), former professional American football player and coach

== See also ==
- William Barnes (disambiguation)
