= Edgehill United Methodist Church =

Church in Nashville, Tennessee, US

Coordinates: 36.14338°N 86.79075°W

- Edgehill United Methodist Church
- Location: Nashville, Tennessee
- Country: United States
- Denomination: United Methodist Church
- Website: www.edgehill.org

History
- Founded: 1966

Edgehill United Methodist Church is a United Methodist in the Edgehill neighborhood of Nashville, Tennessee, United States.

== History ==
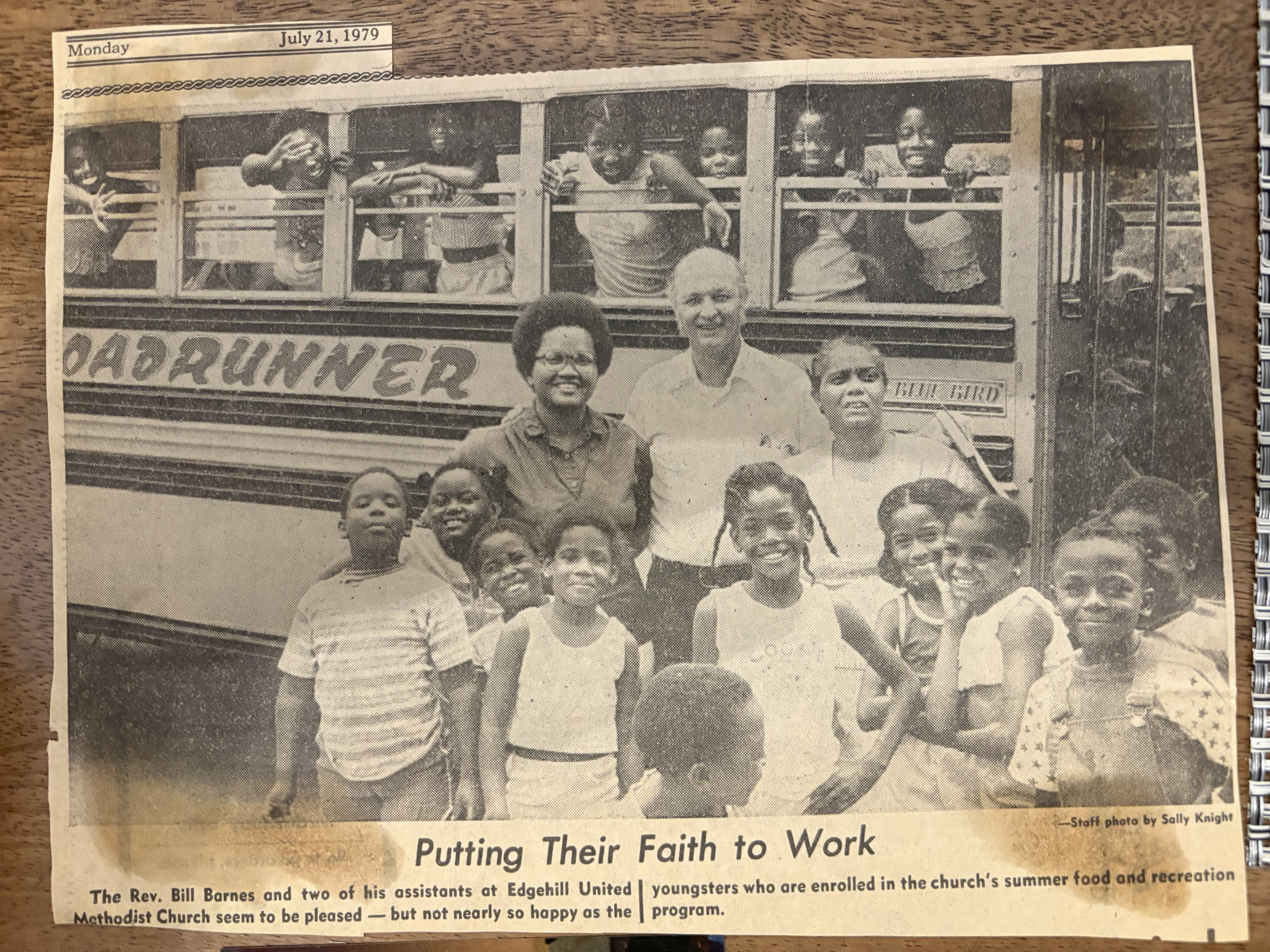
Rev. Bill Barnes was a civil rights activist in Nashville and founding pastor of Edgehill UMC. He planted the church as one of the first racially integrated congregations in Nashville.

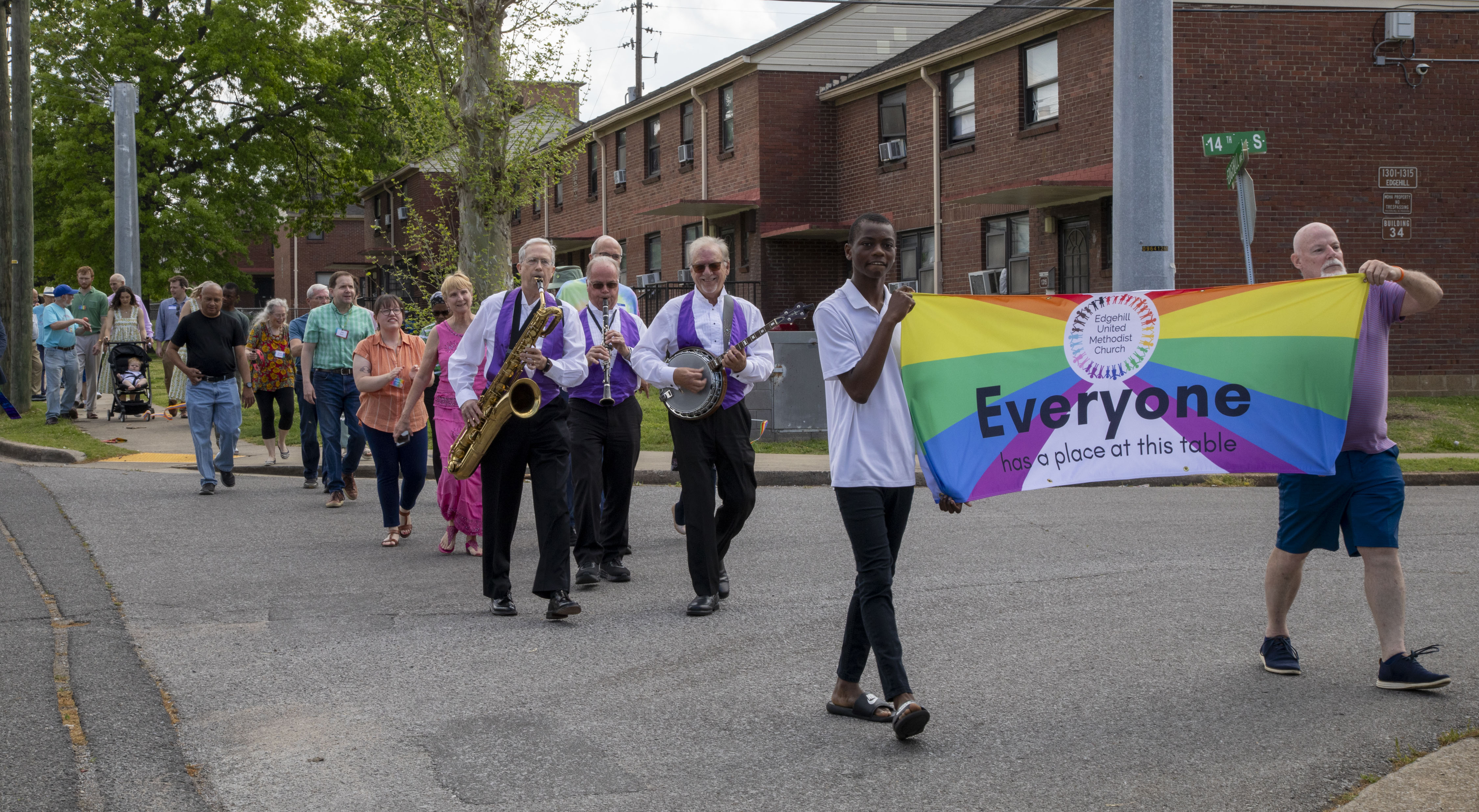
Edgehill UMC marching down Edgehill Ave for their Easter parade

Edgehill United Methodist Church was founded in 1966 in the historically Black Edgehill neighborhood of Nashville, Tennessee. Rev. Bill Barnes, the founding pastor, served the church from 1966 to 1996. Edgehill UMC is recognized as one of the first (if not the first) intentionally racially integrated churches in Nashville. The musician Moses Dillard served as an associate minister at Edgehill in the mid 1980s.

Various groups and organizations have been birthed by or in partnership with Edgehill UMC and its members including Luke 14:12, the oldest feeding ministry in Nashville, Empowering Neighborhood Partnership, and Tying Nashville Together (TNT), which became Nashville Organized for Action and Hope (NOAH).

=== LGBTQIA+ history and outreach ===
Edgehill was the first United Methodist Church in the southeastern United States to openly affirm and include LGBTQIA+ individuals. Members of the congregation were instrumental in founding the Reconciling Ministries Network, a movement advocating for the full inclusion of LGBTQIA+ people within the United Methodist Church. Edgehill first opened its doors to LGBTQIA+ individuals in 1971 when it made the then controversial decision to open its doors to a Metropolitan Community Church congregation that needed a place to worship. News of this partnership spread and in 1977, it caused backlash from the Tennessee Annual Conference (now Tennessee Western Kentucky) of the United Methodist Church, which objected and pressured Edgehill to break ties. The church spend a year exploring the issue of LGBTQIA+ inclusion in the church after which the congregation voted and reaffirmed its commitment to inclusion. In 1984, the Reconciling Ministries Network was born and modeled its invitation to churches to discern inclusion on Edgehill's work in the late 1970s.

Edgehill UMC was also instrumental in advocacy for and care of HIV/AIDS victims in the early days of the crisis. Much of this work is chronicled in interviews in the forthcoming documentary The Body of Christ has AIDS].

== Beliefs ==
=== Marriage ===
The church has an inclusive vision and celebrates both opposite-sex marriages and same-sex marriages.
