= Edward Ratcliff (soldier) =

African American Union Army soldier (1835–1915)

- Born: February 8, 1835; James City County, Virginia, US
- Died: March 10, 1915 (aged 80); York County, Virginia, US
- Military career
- Allegiance: United States; Union
- Branch: United States Army; Union Army
- Service years: 1864–1867
- Rank: Sergeant Major
- Units: Company C, 38th U.S. Colored Troops
- Conflicts: American Civil War: Battle of Chaffin's Farm
- Awards: Medal of Honor

Edward Ratcliff (February 8, 1835 – March 10, 1915) was an African American Union Army soldier during the American Civil War and a recipient of America's highest military decoration—the Medal of Honor—for his actions at the Battle of Chaffin's Farm.

Born as a slave, he was freed when the Union Army took Yorktown. By September 29, 1864, Ratcliff was serving as a first sergeant in Company C of the 38th Regiment U.S. Colored Troops. On that day, his unit participated in the Battle of Chaffin's Farm in Virginia, and it was for his actions during the battle that he was awarded the Medal of Honor six months later, on April 6, 1865.

Ratcliff reached the rank of sergeant major before leaving the military. He died at age 80.

== Medal of Honor citation ==

Rank and Organization:

First Sergeant, Company C, 38th U.S. Colored Troops. Place and Date: At Chapins Farm, Va., September 29, 1864. Birth: James County, Va. Date of Issue: April 6, 1865.

Citation:

Commanded and gallantly led his company after the commanding officer had been killed; was the first enlisted man to enter the enemy's works.

== See also ==
- List of Medal of Honor recipients
- List of American Civil War Medal of Honor recipients: Q–S
- List of African American Medal of Honor recipients
- Melvin Claxton and Mark Puls, Uncommon valor : a story of race, patriotism, and glory in the final battles of the Civil War, (Wiley, 2006) (ISBN 0471468231)
