= William Barnes (died 1558) =

English politician

William Barnes, Barne, Barneis or Berners (by 1502–58), of Thoby, Essex, was an English politician.

== Family ==
Barnes had four sons, including the MP for Wigan, William Barnes, and one daughter.

== Career ==
He was a member (MP) of the Parliament of England for Marlborough in 1542, Taunton in April 1554, Downton in November 1554 and East Grinstead in 1555.
