= United States Colored Troops Memorial Statue (Lexington Park, Maryland) =

American Civil War memorial in Maryland, United States

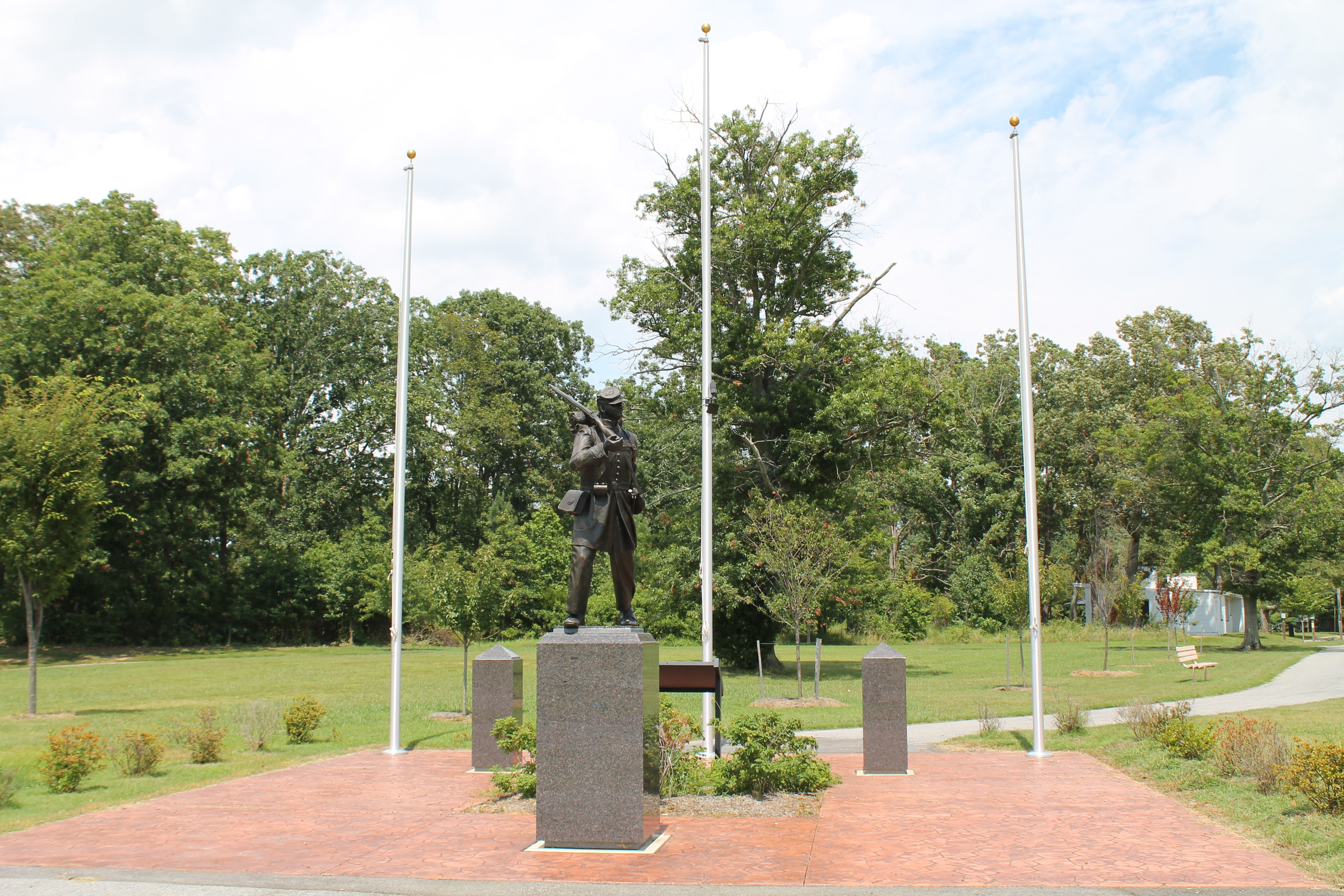
United States Colored Troops memorial in Lexington Park, Maryland. Honoring African-American soldiers and sailors from St. Mary's County who served in the Union Army during the Civil War. More than 700 African-American soldiers served, including many men who had escaped slavery Photo by Potomac Sun Photography

The United States Colored Troops Memorial Statue is a memorial to the more than 700 African-American soldiers and sailors from St. Mary's County, Maryland who served in the Union forces during the American Civil War.

It is located in the city of Lexington Park, Maryland. The memorial was completed and dedicated in 2012.

The memorial includes an educational kiosk with a written history and also features two African-American men, William H. Barnes and James H. Harris, from St. Mary's County who received the Medal of Honor. A photograph of William H. Barnes is included.

== History ==
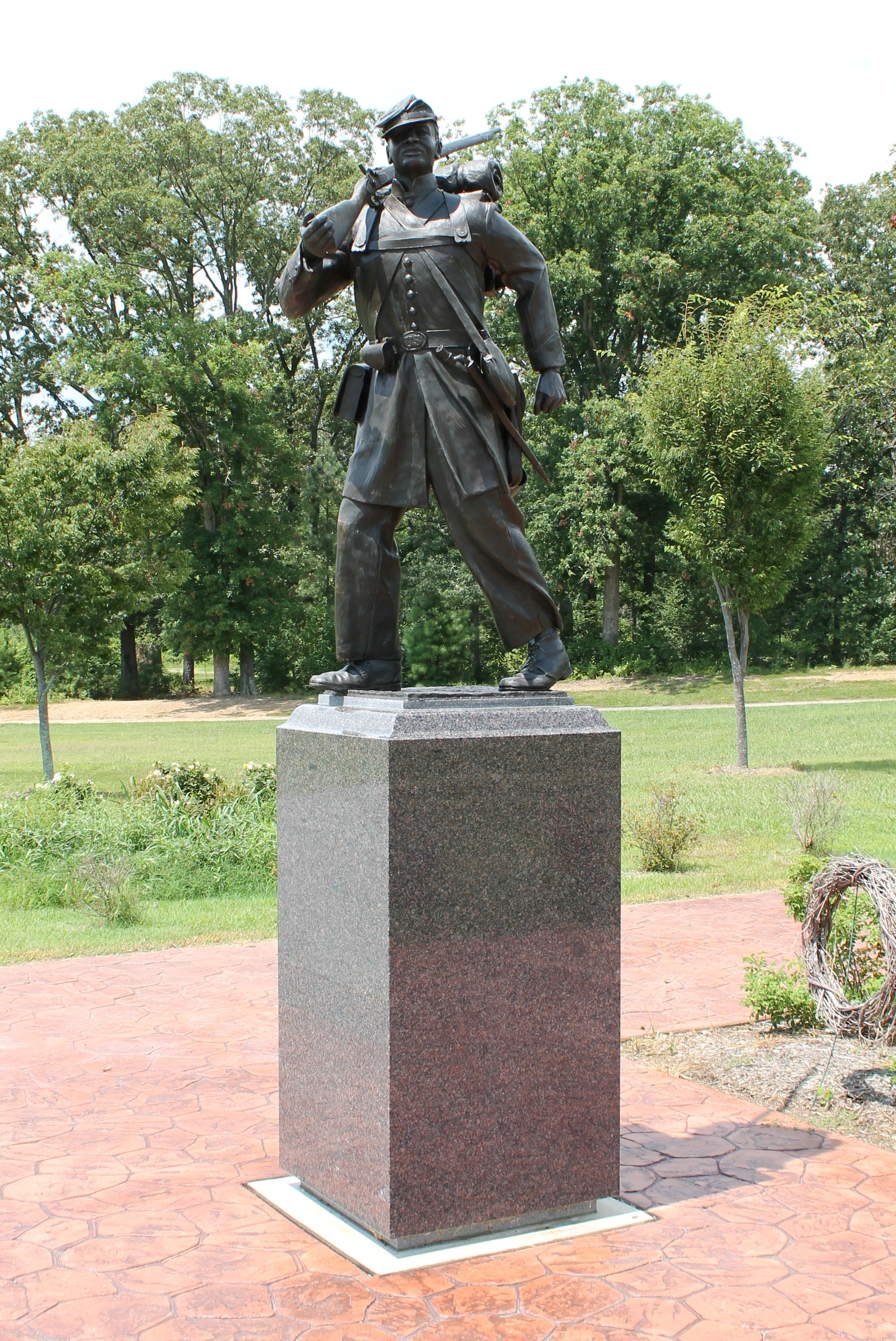
This statue is the centerpiece of the memorial. It shows a USCT soldier in full battle dress, as he would look marching between engagements. The service of USCT soldiers and sailors was vital to the success of Union forces in the war and would ultimately contribute to the liberation of all enslaved peoples of St. Mary's County and the United States as a whole. It would also lead to the preservation of the Union and the extension of its founding principles to all of its citizens.Photo by Potomac Sun Photography

=== Soldiers and sailors ===
About 700 African-American soldiers from the county served on the Union side during the war. These included many men who escaped slavery and joined the Union cause. There were also many free Black citizens of the county, mostly tenant farmers, who also served. White soldiers from all walks of life in the county served as well.

=== Recruitment ===
Most men were recruited by the Union Army at special stations in St. Mary's County, which offered freedom to slaves who volunteered for service. Many in the county risked escape, regardless of the risk of incurring severe punishment from plantation owners, and signed up for military duty. Many free African Americans from the county, many of whom were tenant farmers or sharecroppers, also enlisted. A number of White county residents enlisted as well. Together, their service would ultimately contribute to the liberation of all enslaved peoples of St. Mary's County and the United States as a whole.

=== Medal of Honor recipients ===
Two African-American St. Mary's County men who served, William H. Barnes and James H. Harris, had both been free tenant farmers before the war. They had both volunteered for service in the Union Army. Both saw heavy fighting and each was awarded the Medal of Honor for their actions in the Battle of Chaffin's Farm (also called the "Battle of New Market Heights"). They served in the 38th United States Colored Infantry regiment alongside other St. Mary's County men, including many who had escaped slavery.

=== Memorial dedication ===
The memorial was dedicated in 2012. The dedication was officiated by Congressman Steny Hoyer, former Majority Leader of the United States House of Representatives. Officials from St. Mary's County, including St. Mary's County Commissioner Dan Raley and officials from the nearby Patuxent River Naval Air Station were in attendance as well. The event was also attended by historians, archeologists and members of the general public.

== Juneteenth celebrations ==
A yearly Juneteenth celebration gathering is now held at the memorial.

== See also ==
- American Civil War
- History of slavery in Maryland
- List of amendments to the United States Constitution see the 13th, 14th and 15th amendments, enacted in 1865, 1868 and 1870
- List of African-American Medal of Honor recipients
- List of United States Colored Troops Civil War Units
- List of American Civil War Medal of Honor recipients
- Slavery in the United States
- United States Colored Troops
