= 38th United States Colored Infantry Regiment =

- Active: January 23, 1864 – January 25, 1867
- Country: United States
- Branch: Army
- Type: Infantry
- Part of: 2nd Brigade, 3rd Division, XVIII Corps, Army of the James (August 1864 – December 1864); 1st Brigade, 3rd Division, XXV Corps (December 1864); 1st Brigade, 1st Division, XXV Corps (December 1864 – January 1866)

Commanders
- Notable commanders: Col. Robert M. Hall

The 38th United States Colored Infantry Regiment was an African American unit of the Union Army during the American Civil War. A part of the United States Colored Troops, the regiment saw action in Virginia during the war and later served on the Texas frontier.

== Service ==
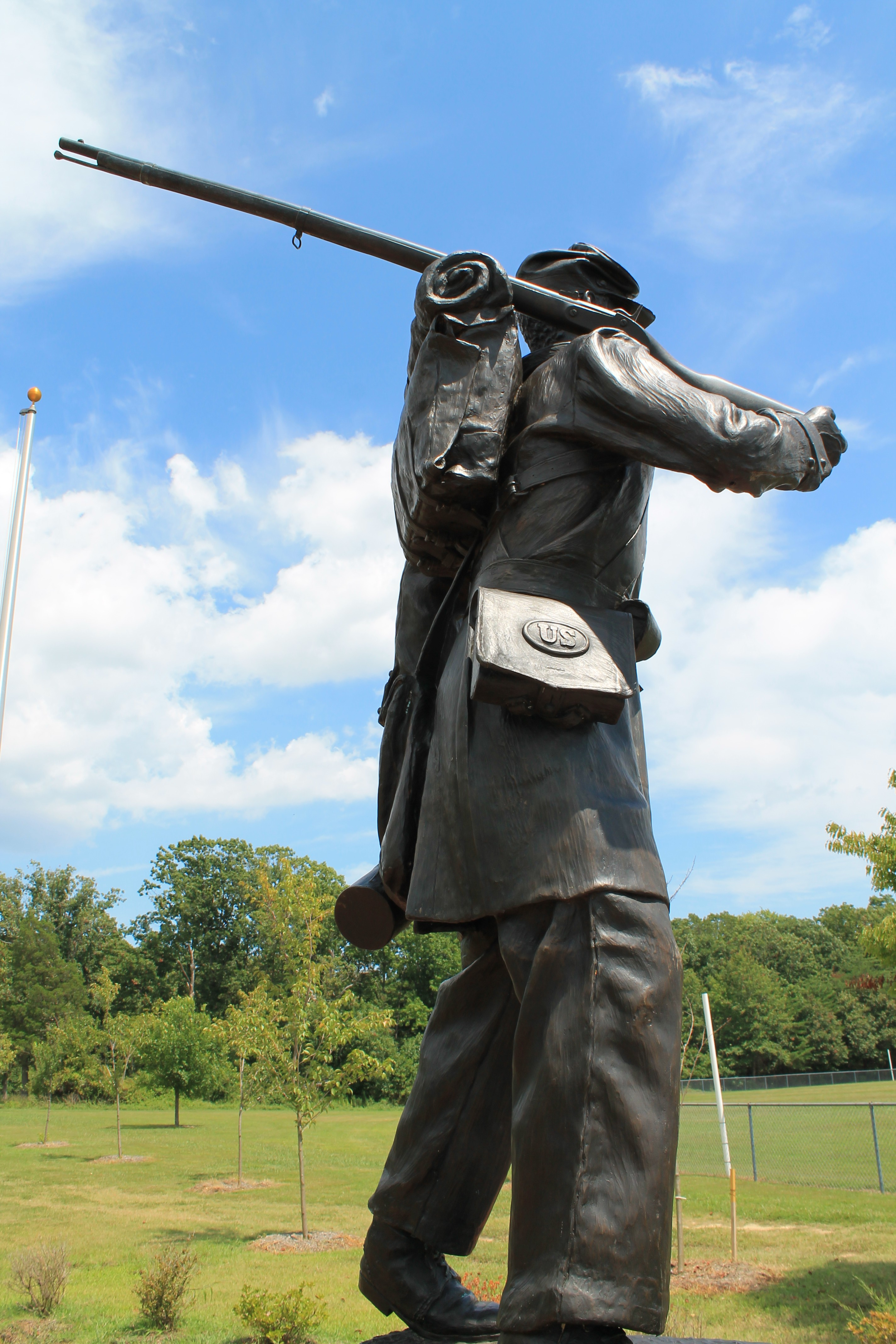
This memorial statue was based on an actual soldier from the 38th United States Colored Regiment. It is the centerpiece of the United States Colored Troops Memorial Statue monument in Lexington Park, Maryland. Some of the 38th USCT had initially been recruited in Maryland before the Union forces they were assigned to had crossed the Potomac into Virginia. This memorial honors all local African-American soldiers who served in the Union Army in the Civil War. The monument also has a display that specifically references two Maryland soldiers from the 38th USCT regiment who were Medal of Honor recipients. Potomac Sun Photography, 2013.

=== Virginia engagements ===
The 38th United States Colored Infantry Regiment was composed of men from St. Mary's County Maryland (both free Black tenant farmers and men who had escaped slavery) in combination with many Virginia men who had been liberated from slavery by the Union army. These two contingents constituted the 38th United States Colored Troops regiment which was organized in Virginia on January 23, 1864, and then subsequently served first at Norfolk and Portsmouth in the Department of Virginia and then served in North Carolina until June 1864, after which it was involved in operations against Petersburg and Richmond for the remainder of the war.

The regiment participated in engagements at Chaffin's Farm on September 29-September 30, Deep Bottom on October 1 and Fair Oaks on October 27-October 28, 1864.

=== Three Medal of Honor awardees ===
Three members of the 38th, William H. Barnes, James H. Harris, and Edward Ratcliff, were awarded the Medal of Honor for their actions at Chaffin's Farm. The unit then served in the trenches north of the James River until the fall of Richmond in April 1865. The 38th occupied Richmond on April 3, 1865, and continued duty in the Department of Virginia through the end of the war and into May.

=== Texas ===
The 38th was moved to Texas between May 24 and June 6, 1865, where it would stay for the rest of its service. The unit saw duty at various points along the Rio Grande in the southern portion of the state, including Brownsville and Brazos Santiago, as well as at Indianola and Galveston on the gulf coast.

=== Mustering out/total losses ===
The 38th was mustered out on January 25, 1867, after three years of existence. The regiment lost a total of 237 men during its service; one officer and 42 enlisted men were killed or mortally wounded and two officers and 192 enlisted men died of disease.

The 38th USCT is not to be confused with the 38th Infantry Regiment which was first established on 28 July 1866, as part of the Regular Army, one of six segregated, all-black regiments created following the Civil War. It was organized on 1 October of that year at Jefferson Barracks, Missouri, and was stationed in New Mexico Territory and along the transcontinental railroads then under construction. On 15 March 1869, the 38th was consolidated with the 41st Infantry Regiment and redesignated as the 24th Infantry Regiment.

== United States Colored Troops Memorial Statue ==
The United States Colored Troops Memorial Statue specifically mentions soldiers of the 38th USCT. The memorial is located in Lexington Park, Maryland. A group of men from that area also served in the 38th USCT, they had accompanied the Union Army into Virginia, where they were combined with a group of Virginia men who had recently been liberated from slavery.

The men from Maryland included men who had recently escaped slavery as well as a number of free Black tenant farmers from the area. Altogether these Maryland and Virginia recruits were formed into the 38th United States Colored Infantry Regiment.

Two of the medal of honor recipients of the 38th were from the Maryland contingent, William H. Barnes and also James H. Harris. The informational kiosk at the memorial mentions them specifically.

The memorial also honors all of the approximately 700 African-American men from St. Mary's County, Maryland, who served in several different regiments and also on sailing ships of war or transport in the Civil War, as well as the 80 or so White St. Mary's County residents who served on the Union side, one of whom was also a medal of honor recipient.

== See also ==
- List of United States Colored Troops Civil War Units
