= William Barnes (died 1559) =

English Member of Parliament

William Barnes or Barne, Barneis or Berners (by 1533–59), of Fryerning and Thoby, Essex, was an English Member of Parliament.

He was a Member (MP) of the Parliament of England for Hythe in April 1554.
