= Bill Barnes (footballer) =

Scottish footballer

Personal information
- Full name: William Barnes
- Date of birth: 16 March 1939 (age 87)
- Place of birth: Dumbarton, Scotland
- Position: Full back

Youth career
- –1958: Rutherglen Glencairn

Senior career*
Years	Team	Apps	(Gls)
1958–1961	Bradford City	59	(0)
1961–1966	Scarborough		
1966–1968	Bradford Park Avenue	53	(0)
1968	Arnold		
Total		112	(0)
- * Club domestic league appearances and goals

William Barnes (born 16 March 1939) is a Scottish former professional footballer who played as a full back. Active primarily in England, Barnes made over 100 appearances in the Football League.

== Career ==
Born in Dumbarton, Barnes began his career with Rutherglen Glencairn. He signed professional terms with Bradford City in 1958, and made 59 league appearances between then and 1961. Barnes then played non-league football with Scarborough, before rejoining league football in 1966 with Bradford Park Avenue. After leaving Park Avenue in 1968, Barnes played non-league football with Arnold.
