= Bill Barnes (United Methodist minister) =

- Born: July 18, 1931; Nashville, Tennessee, U.S.
- Died: August 21, 2017 (aged 86); Nashville, Tennessee, U.S.
- Education: Vanderbilt University; Yale Divinity School
- Occupation: Pastor
- Spouse: Brenda Barnes
- Children: 3

Bill Barnes (1931 – August 21, 2017) was an American United Methodist minister. He was the pastor of Edgehill United Methodist Church in Nashville, Tennessee, from 1966 to 1996. Known as "the conscience of Nashville" for his civil rights, homelessness and LGBTQ advocacy, Barnes admitted in his 2007 book that he "grieve[d] over its divisions and exclusions, its racism and classism and Nimbyism."

== Early life ==
Barnes was born in 1931 in Nashville, Tennessee. His father was a barber, and Barnes grew up poor. He graduated from Vanderbilt University in 1953, served in the United States Army from 1953 to 1955, and graduated from the Yale Divinity School in 1959.

== Career ==
Barnes was an early supporter of civil rights in New York City's Harlem, where he worked alongside William Stringfellow. In 1966, he returned to Nashville and founded Edgehill United Methodist Church, an integrated church, in the predominantly African-American neighborhood of Edgehill. His sermons focused on the Book of Amos. To support himself, Barnes worked as a part-time instructor at the Scarritt College for Christian Workers. Barnes retired from pastoral work in 1996.

In 2007, Barnes authored To Love A City: A Congregation's Long Love Affair With Nashville's Inner City, in which he recounted the history of the church and its philanthropic endeavors, including its anti-poverty, homelessness and LGBTQ advocacy. In the book, he admitted he "grieved over its divisions and exclusions, its racism and classism and Nimbyism."

Barnes became known as "the conscience of Nashville" for his civil rights, homelessness and LGBTQ advocacy. He was also opposed to the Vietnam War. In 1979, with Presbyterian minister Don Beisswenger, Barnes co-founded Project Return, a rehabilitation program for returning citizens. In 2013, the Barnes Fund for Affordable Housing, established by Mayor Karl Dean to reduce homelessness in Nashville, was named in his honor.

== Personal life, death and legacy ==
Barnes resided in Nashville with his wife Brenda and their three children. He died on August 21, 2017, in Nashville, at age 86. His funeral was held at the Belmont United Methodist Church on September 2, 2017. On July 17, 2019, a historical marker in his honor was unveiled by Mayor David Briley outside the church at 1502 Edgehill Avenue.

== Selected works ==
- Barnes, William L. (2007). To Love A City: A Congregation's Long Love Affair With Nashville's Inner City. Nashville, Tennessee: Edgehill United Methodist Church. OCLC 140518242.
