= William H. Barnes (Medal of Honor) =

United States Army Medal of Honor recipient

William Henry Barnes
- Born: 1840 or 1845; Saint Mary's County, Virginia, U.S.
- Died: December 24, 1866 (aged 25–26) or 1866 (aged 20–21); Indianola, Texas, U.S.
- Burial place: San Antonio National Cemetery, San Antonio, Texas
- Military career
- Allegiance: United States; Union
- Branch: United States Army; Union Army
- Service years: 1864-1866
- Rank: Sergeant
- Unit: 38th Regiment United States Colored Infantry
- Conflicts: American Civil War; *Battle of Chaffin's Farm
- Awards: Medal of Honor

William Henry Barnes (c. 1840 or 1845-December 24, 1866) was a Union Army soldier during the American Civil War and a recipient of the Medal of Honor, America's highest military decoration. He was African American.

== Biography ==
Barnes was born and raised in St. Mary's County Maryland and worked as a free tenant farmer there before enlisting in the Army from Norfolk, Virginia, on February 11, 1864. He joined as a private into Company C of the 38th United States Colored Infantry Regiment. His enlistment papers record his age as 23, implying a birth year of 1840 or 1841, but other sources give his birth as 1845.

At the Battle of Chaffin's Farm, on September 29, 1864, Barnes' regiment was among a division of black troops assigned to attack the center of the Confederate defenses at New Market Heights. The defenses consisted of two lines of abatis and one line of palisades manned by Brigadier General John Gregg's Texas Brigade. The attack was met with intense Confederate fire; over fifty percent of the black troops were killed, captured, or wounded. Barnes was awarded the Medal of Honor for being "[a]mong the first to enter the enemy's works; although wounded." His medal was issued six months after the battle, on April 6, 1865, and he was promoted to Sergeant another three months later, on July 1, 1865.

Barnes remained in the Army after the war, traveling to Texas with his regiment. He died of tuberculosis at an Army hospital in Indianola on December 24, 1866. A marker in his memory was placed in San Antonio National Cemetery, San Antonio, Texas.

== Medal of Honor citation ==
Rank and organization: Private, Company C, 38th U.S. Colored Troops. Place and date: At Chaffins Farm, Va., September 29, 1864. Entered service at:------. Birth: St. Marys County, Md. Date of issue April 6, 1865.

Citation:

Among the first to enter the enemy's works; although wounded.

== United States Colored Troops Memorial Statue ==
William H. Barnes is specifically honored and memorialized by the United States Colored Troops Memorial Statue in Lexington Park, Maryland (in St. Mary's County, where he grew up and also worked as a farmer). The informational kiosk at the memorial mentions him specifically.

== See also ==
- List of American Civil War Medal of Honor recipients: A–F
- Melvin Claxton and Mark Puls, Uncommon valor : a story of race, patriotism, and glory in the final battles of the Civil War, (Wiley, 2006) (ISBN 0471468231)
