= Maryland Route 214 =

Highway in Maryland

Maryland Route 214
- Central Avenue
- Maryland Route 214 highlighted in red

Route information
- Maintained by MDSHA
- Length: 24.97 mi (40.19 km)
- Existed: 1927–present
- Tourist routes: Roots and Tides Scenic Byway

Major junctions
- West end: East Capitol Street at the District of Columbia boundary in Capitol Heights
- I-95 / I-495 in Largo; MD 202 in Largo; MD 193 in Kettering; US 301 in Bowie; MD 424 in Davidsonville; MD 2 in Edgewater; MD 253 in Edgewater; MD 468 in Edgewater
- East end: Road end in Beverley Beach

Location
- Country: United States
- State: Maryland
- Counties: Prince George's, Anne Arundel

Highway system
- Maryland highway system; Interstate; US; State; Scenic Byways
| ← MD 213 | → MD 216 |

Maryland Route 214 (MD 214) is a state highway in the U.S. state of Maryland. Known for most of its length as Central Avenue, the highway runs 24.97 miles (40.19 km) from Southern Avenue and East Capitol Street at the District of Columbia boundary in Capitol Heights east to Beverley Beach. MD 214 connects the central Prince George's County suburbs of Capitol Heights, Seat Pleasant, Largo, and Bowie with the southern Anne Arundel County communities of Davidsonville and Edgewater and several beach villages along the Chesapeake Bay. The highway connects Interstate 95 (I-95)/I-495 (Capital Beltway) to Northwest Stadium, Six Flags America, and several stations of the Washington Metro's Blue and Silver lines, which the route parallels between Capitol Heights and Largo.

MD 214 was constructed as part of three state highways. MD 214 proper was constructed in the mid-1910s from Washington to Largo and extended east to what is now U.S. Route 301 (US 301) through the 1920s. MD 254 was built from MD 2 in Edgewater west to Davidsonville in the early to mid-1920s. MD 253 was constructed from the modern end of the highway southeast to Beverley Beach between the mid-1920s and early 1930s. The gap between Bowie and Davidsonville was filled in the mid-1930s; MD 214 was extended east across a new Patuxent River bridge and took over MD 254's route to Edgewater. In the late 1940s, MD 214 was relocated through Edgewater and extended along most of MD 253 to Beverley Beach. The state highway was widened in Prince George's County in the 1930s and again in the 1950s, and from US 301 to MD 2 in the 1940s and again in the 1950s. MD 214 was expanded to a divided highway at US 301 in the late 1950s, at its interchange with the Capital Beltway in the mid-1960s, and when it bypassed Capitol Heights in the late 1960s. The two-lane gaps between those three segments were filled in the 1980s and 1990s.

== Route description ==
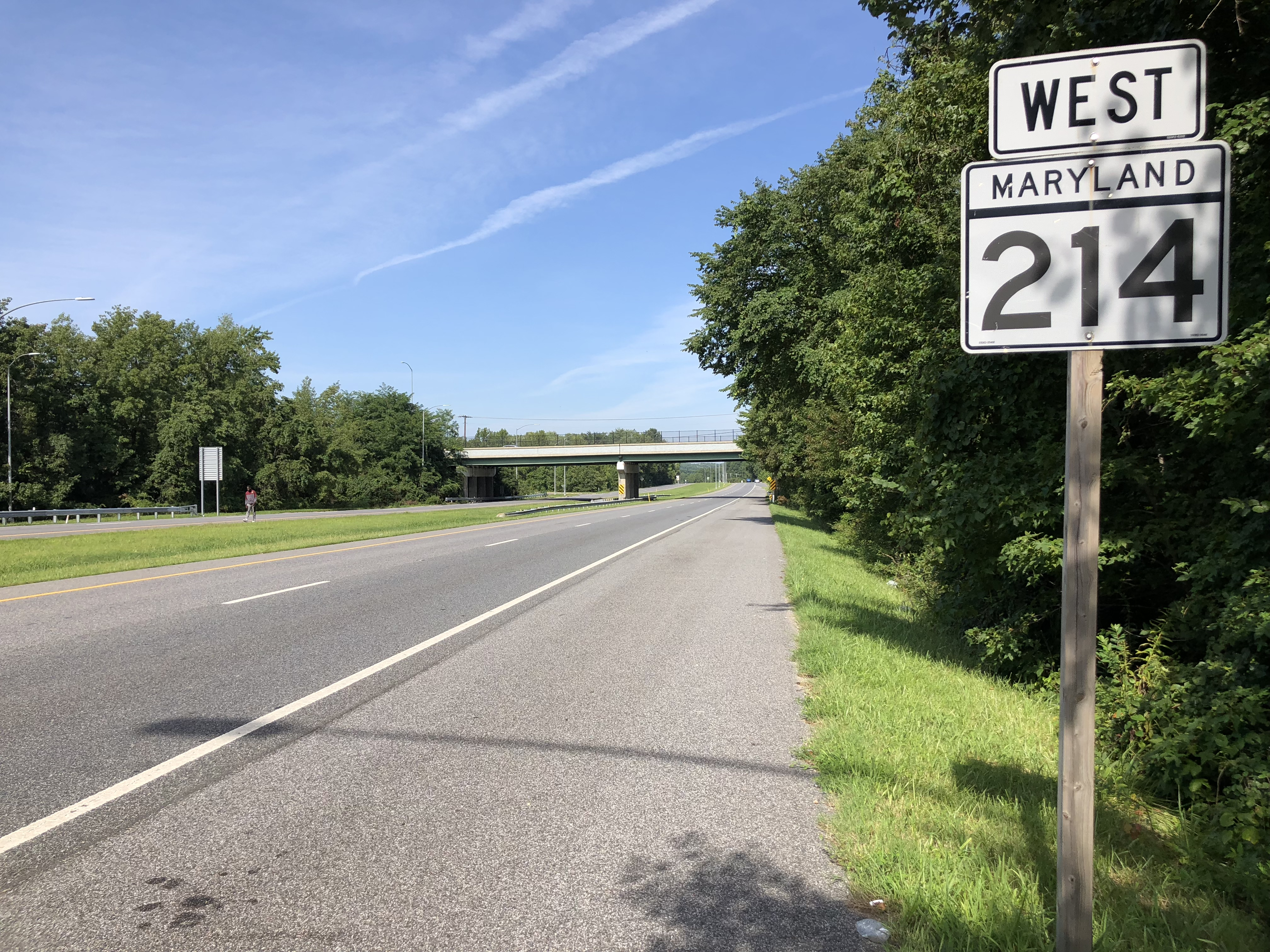
MD 214 westbound at the US 301 interchange in Bowie

MD 214 begins at East Capitol Street's intersection with Southern Avenue at the District of Columbia boundary in Capitol Heights. This junction is a short distance southwest of the eastern corner of Washington and adjacent to the Capitol Heights station on Washington Metro's Blue and Silver lines. MD 214 heads east as a six-lane divided highway along the northern edge of the town of Capitol Heights and crosses Henson Creek. The highway begins to follow the southern city limit of Seat Pleasant at its intersection with unsigned MD 332A, which provides full access to MD 332 (Central Avenue). MD 214's name changes to Central Avenue where the eastbound lane of MD 332 (Old Central Avenue) merges into eastbound MD 214. Just east of MD 332, the highway intersects Addison Road and passes the eponymous Metro station.

MD 214 intersects Morgan Boulevard—which leads north to the namesake Metro station and Northwest Stadium, the home of the Washington Commanders—west of its partial cloverleaf interchange with I-95/I-495 (Capital Beltway) in Largo. East of the freeway, the state highway has a partial interchange with Harry S. Truman Drive, which is unsigned MD 202C and leads to Downtown Largo station, which is the eastern terminal of Washington Metro's Blue and Silver lines. The interchange includes a two-lane loop ramp from eastbound MD 214 to Harry S. Truman Drive; access from the north–south crossroad to westbound MD 214 is via a ramp that merges with one of the straight ramps at MD 214's partial cloverleaf interchange with MD 202 (Largo Road). There is no direct access from westbound MD 214 to southbound MD 202 or from northbound MD 202 to eastbound MD 214; those movements are made via Campus Way to the east of the interchange.

MD 214 continues east between the suburbs of Lake Arbor to the north and Kettering to the south. East of the Western Branch of the Patuxent River, the highway intersects MD 193, which heads north as Enterprise Road and south as Watkins Park Drive. MD 214 reduces to four lanes and passes along the southern edge of the Six Flags America amusement park. East of Church Road, the highway enters the southern fringe of the city of Bowie. At Devonwood Drive, which is unsigned MD 978C, MD 214 veers southeast and parallels Hall Road, which is MD 978A. The highways both intersect CSX's Popes Creek Subdivision rail line at-grade and cross Collington Branch before the roads reunite. MD 978B (Old Central Avenue) splits to the southeast ahead of MD 214's partial cloverleaf interchange with US 301 (Robert Crain Highway), then rejoins the main road east of the interchange. Access from eastbound MD 214 to southbound US 301 and from northbound US 301 to eastbound MD 214 is via Old Central Avenue. At the eastern junction with the old road, MD 214 narrows to a two-lane undivided road.

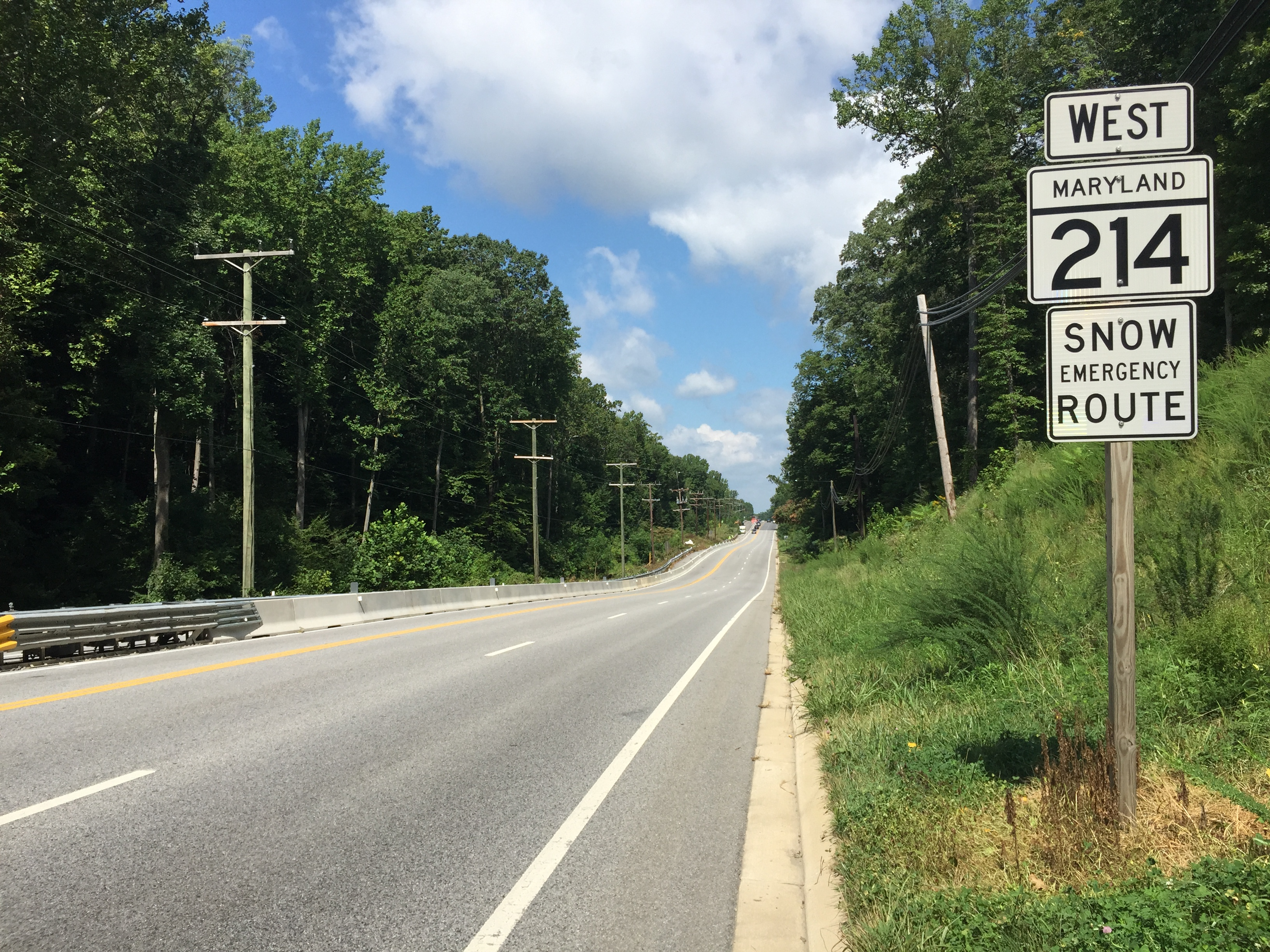
View west along MD 214 at MD 468 in Mayo

MD 214 intersects Queen Anne Bridge Road, which leads to the abandoned Queen Anne Bridge and the historic home Hazelwood, just west of its steel through truss bridge across the Patuxent River at the Prince George's–Anne Arundel county line. The highway meets the southern end of MD 424 (Davidsonville Road) in the Davidsonville Historic District. MD 214 intersects Riva Road and passes the historic home Summer Hill on its way to Edgewater. The highway gains a second lane westbound at Pike Ridge Road, which is unsigned MD 214A. The route gains a second eastbound lane and a median just west of its intersection with MD 2 (Solomons Island Road). MD 214 veers southeast and becomes undivided at Stepneys Lane and meets the southern end of MD 253 (Mayo Road) north of South River High School, then drops to two lanes ahead of its intersection with MD 468 (Muddy Creek Road). MD 214 continues east through the community of Selby-on-the-Bay, where it passes the entrance to Camp Letts and the historic home Gresham. The highway passes through Mayo and its name changes to Beverley Avenue on the northern edge of Beverley Beach. MD 214 curves east onto Grande View Avenue and reaches its eastern terminus at a gate just east of Oakford Avenue.

MD 214 is a part of the National Highway System as an intermodal connector between the Addison Road Metro station and the Capital Beltway. The highway is a National Highway System principal arterial from Southern Avenue to the Addison Road Metro station, from the Capital Beltway to US 301, and from Vicksburg Road near Davidsonville to Shoreham Beach Road in Beverley Beach.

== History ==
Maryland Route 254
- Location: Davidsonville–Edgewater
- Existed: 1927–c. 1939

Central Avenue from Washington east to Edgewater was planned as one of the original state roads laid out by the Maryland State Roads Commission in 1909. This road followed most of MD 214's present alignment from Capitol Heights to Edgewater; the major deviation was between Hall Station on the Pennsylvania Railroad (now CSX's Popes Creek Subdivision) and Davidsonville, between which the highway was planned to follow Queen Anne Bridge Road and cross the Patuxent River at the hamlet of Queen Anne, also known as Hardesty. In Edgewater, the proposed road followed Pike Ridge Road and a small part of modern MD 2 northeast to end at Solomons Island Road, which briefly followed what is now MD 253, south of the South River. Central Avenue was paved as a 14-to-19-foot-wide (4.3 to 5.8 m) concrete road from the District of Columbia through Capitol Heights to Hill Road east of Seat Pleasant in 1914. The highway was extended east as a 14-foot-wide (4.3 m) concrete road to what is now MD 202 in Largo in 1915. The remainder of the planned state road was determined to not form a necessary part of the state road system in 1915. Central Avenue was extended east from Largo to near what is now MD 193 as a 15-foot-wide (4.6 m) concrete road starting in 1919; the extension was finished by 1921. The highway was extended again to the Pennsylvania Railroad at Hall Station by 1923. MD 214 was extended east as a concrete road from Hall Station to the newly built Crain Highway, then part of MD 3, in 1929 and 1930.

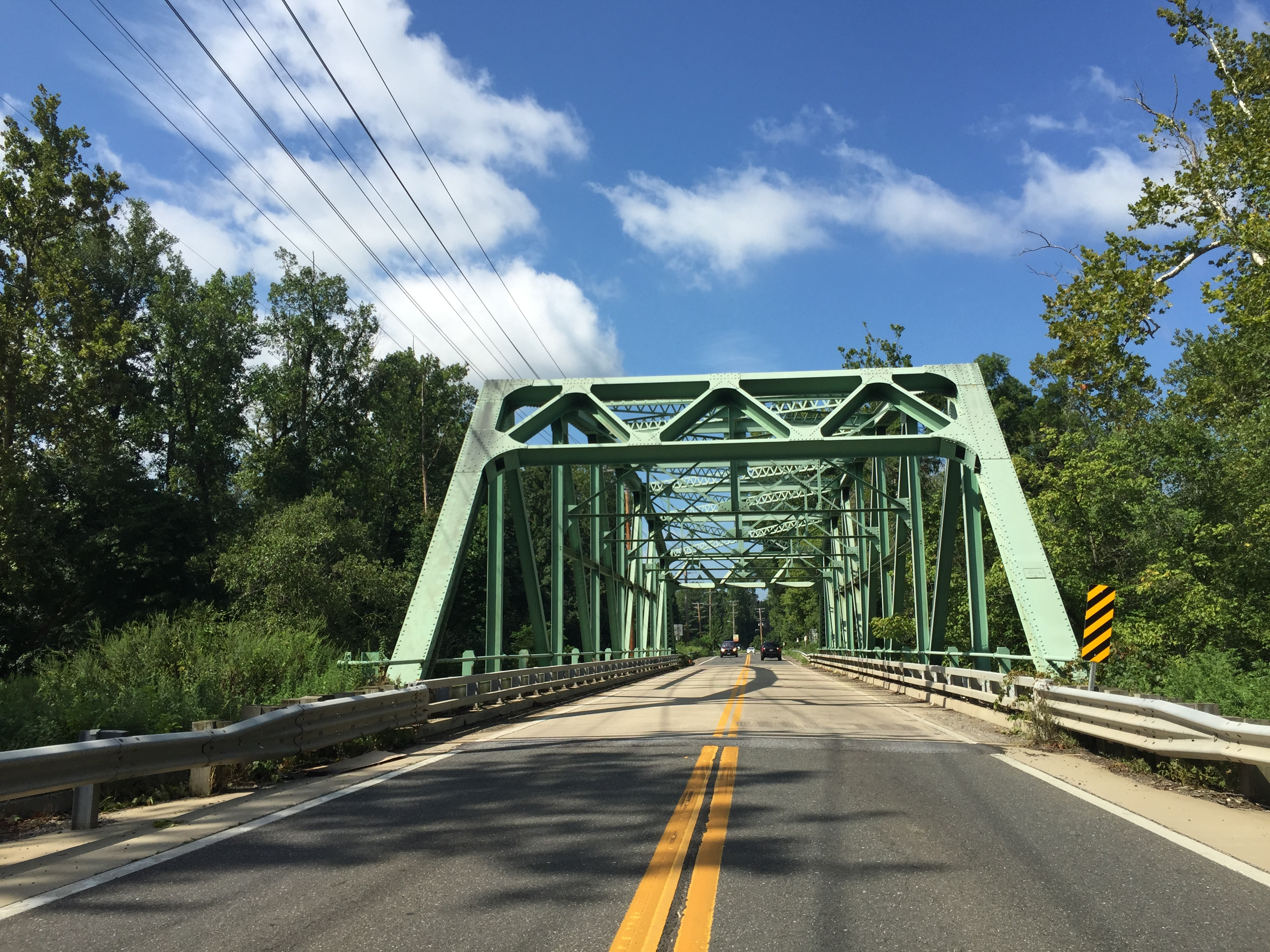
MD 214 westbound across the Patuxent River

The first portion of MD 214 in Anne Arundel County was built along Pike Ridge Road and the modern alignment as a gravel road named Davidsonville Road from Solomons Island Road (now MD 2) to Riva Road by 1921. This highway was extended west to Davidsonville in 1924 and 1925. Davidsonville Road was originally designated MD 254. The portion of MD 214 from MD 253 in Edgewater to Beverley Beach was constructed as part of MD 253. This highway was built as a 15-foot-wide (4.6 m) gravel road from the modern MD 214–MD 253 intersection east to the entrance to Camp Letts by 1923. MD 253 was extended southeast to Selby-on-the-Bay in 1929 and 1930. The state highway reached MD 214's present terminus in Beverley Beach in 1932. MD 214 and MD 254 were connected with the construction of a gravel highway along mostly new alignment between MD 3 and MD 424 in 1934 and 1935. The project included the present steel through truss bridge across the Patuxent River. MD 214 was extended east along MD 254's course to MD 2 by 1939.

MD 214 was widened to 20 feet (6.1 m) from Washington to Largo by 1934. The highway was also proposed to be widened from 16 to 20 feet (4.9 to 6.1 m) from Largo to Crain Highway, from 15 to 20 feet (4.6 to 6.1 m) along the MD 254 section from Davidsonville to Edgewater, and from 16 to 20 feet (4.9 to 6.1 m) along MD 253 from Edgewater to Beverley Beach. The whole Prince George's County section of the highway was widened and resurfaced between 1936 and 1938. MD 214 was widened from 16 to 24 feet (4.9 to 7.3 m) and resurfaced from Edgewater to Davidsonville between 1942 and 1944. The highway was widened by 7 feet (2.1 m) from the east end of Capitol Heights to Addison Road in Seat Pleasant in 1948; that same year, the highway was widened to 40 feet (12 m) at the US 301 junction to provide extra capacity at that signalized intersection. MD 214 was relocated to its present alignment between Pike Ridge Road and MD 253 in 1949. The following year, MD 214 replaced MD 253 from Edgewater to its present eastern terminus in Beverley Beach. The state highway was widened and resurfaced from US 301 to the Patuxent River starting in 1952 and from the river to MD 2 starting in 1954.

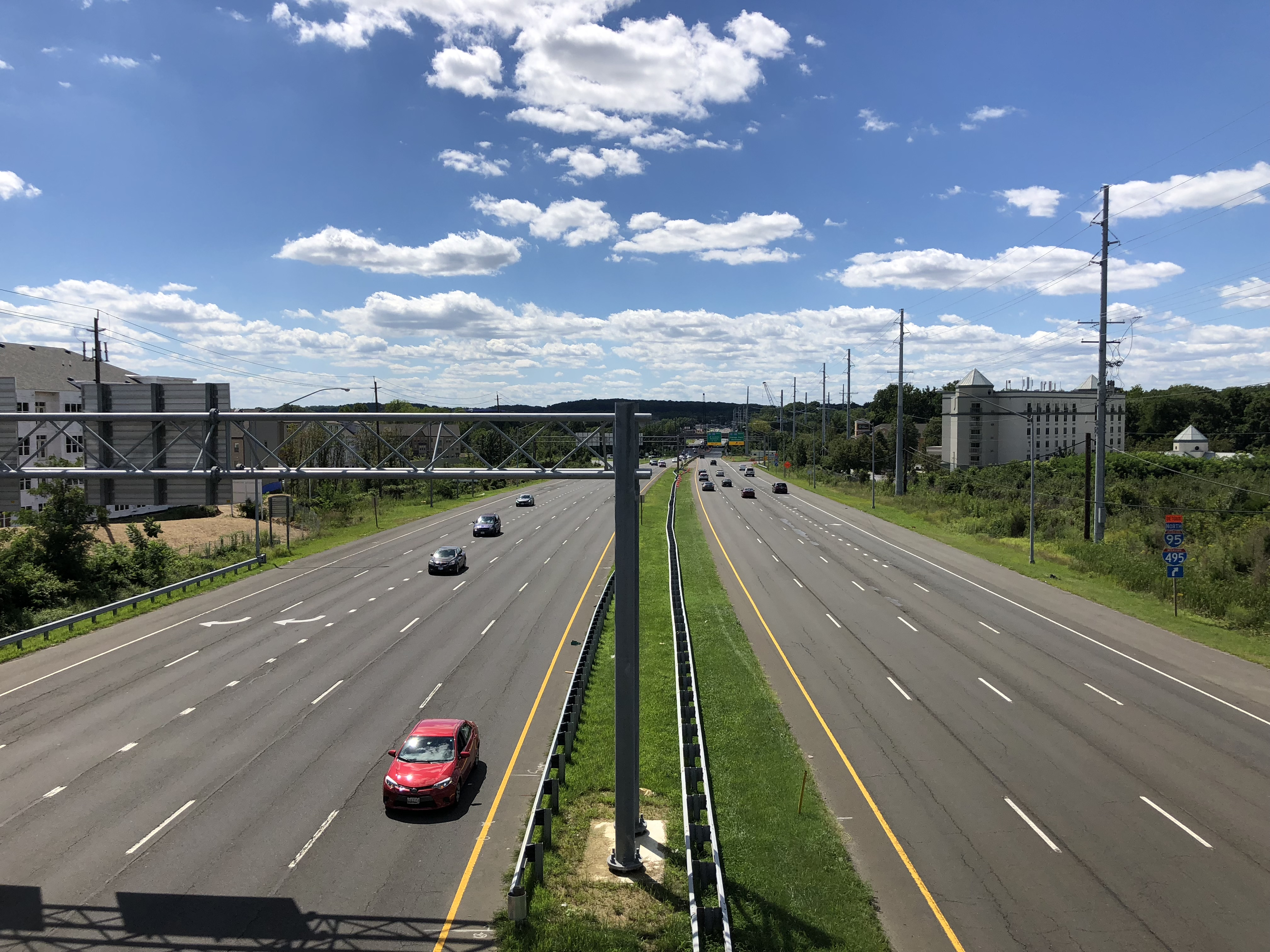
MD 214 westbound viewed from Harry S Truman Drive in Largo

Construction on the first divided highway segment of MD 214 began in 1957 and coincided with the expansion of US 301 to a divided highway between Upper Marlboro and Bowie. MD 214 was expanded to a divided highway from west of Hall Station to east of US 301; the project included interchange bridges and ramps between the two highways. The expansion of MD 214 and the US 301 interchange were completed in 1959; the bypassed portions of MD 214 became segments of MD 978. The next section of divided highway was built in 1964 when the highway's full cloverleaf interchange with the Capital Beltway was completed. The third segment of divided highway was created when MD 214 was relocated through Capitol Heights as an eastward extension of East Capitol Street to Addison Road in Seat Pleasant in 1969. Central Avenue through Capitol Heights was renumbered MD 332. MD 214 was expanded to a divided highway between Seat Pleasant and the Beltway in 1981 and from east of MD 202 to east of MD 193 in 1989. The gap between the Beltway and east of MD 202 was filled in 1993 and included the interchanges with MD 202 and Harry S. Truman Drive. The final gap in divided highway between Capitol Heights and US 301, from east of MD 193 to west of Hall Station, was filled in 1997. MD 214 was expanded to four lanes from west of MD 2 to east of MD 253 by 1999. MD 214's interchange with the Beltway was transformed from a full cloverleaf to a partial cloverleaf in two steps. The loop ramp from westbound MD 214 to the southbound Beltway was removed in 2003 and the one from the northbound Beltway to westbound MD 214 was taken out of service in 2008.

== Junction list ==
| County | Location | mi | km | Destinations | Notes |
|---|---|---|---|---|---|
| Prince George's | Capitol Heights | 0.00 | 0.00 | East Capitol Street west / Southern Avenue – Washington | District of Columbia boundary; western terminus |
| Prince George's | Seat Pleasant | 0.68 | 1.09 | To MD 332 west (Central Avenue) – Capitol Heights | Connector between MD 214 and MD 332 is unsigned MD 332A |
| Prince George's | Seat Pleasant | 0.80 | 1.29 | MD 332 (Old Central Avenue) | Eastern terminus of MD 332; ramp from eastbound MD 332 to eastbound MD 214 only |
| Prince George's | Largo | 3.67 | 5.91 | I-95 / I-495 (Capital Beltway) – College Park, Baltimore, JB Andrews, Richmond | I-95 / I-495 Exit 15 |
| Prince George's | Largo | 4.13 | 6.65 | Harry S. Truman Drive – Downtown Largo, Northwest Stadium | Eastbound exit, westbound entrance; unsigned MD 202C |
| Prince George's | Largo | 4.61 | 7.42 | MD 202 (Largo Road/Landover Road) / Harry S. Truman Drive – Upper Marlboro | Partial cloverleaf interchange; no access from westbound MD 214 to southbound MD 202 or from northbound MD 202 to eastbound MD 214 |
| Prince George's | Kettering | 6.77 | 10.90 | MD 193 (Watkins Park Drive/Enterprise Road) – Upper Marlboro, Greenbelt | |
| Prince George's | Bowie | 9.48 | 15.26 | Devonwood Drive north / Jennings Mill Drive south | Devonwood Drive is unsigned MD 978C |
| Prince George's | Bowie | 10.06 | 16.19 | Hall Road west | Unsigned MD 978A |
| Prince George's | Bowie | 10.47 | 16.85 | Old Central Avenue east to US 301 south | Unsigned MD 978B; access from eastbound MD 214 to southbound US 301 is via MD 978B |
| Prince George's | Bowie | 10.85 | 17.46 | US 301 (Robert Crain Highway) – Baltimore, Upper Marlboro, La Plata | Partial cloverleaf interchange; no access from northbound US 301 to eastbound MD 214 or from eastbound MD 214 to southbound US 301; missing movements made via Old Central Avenue |
| Prince George's | Bowie | 11.19 | 18.01 | Old Central Avenue west | Unsigned MD 978B; access from westbound MD 214 and access to eastbound MD 214; access from northbound US 301 to eastbound MD 214 is via MD 978B |
| Anne Arundel | Davidsonville | 16.09 | 25.89 | MD 424 north (Davidsonville Road) – Crofton | Southern terminus of MD 424 |
| Anne Arundel | Edgewater | 19.47 | 31.33 | MD 2 (Solomons Island Road) – Annapolis, Prince Frederick | |
| Anne Arundel | Edgewater | 20.06 | 32.28 | MD 253 north (Mayo Road) | Southern terminus of MD 253 |
| Anne Arundel | Edgewater | 20.83 | 33.52 | MD 468 south (Muddy Creek Road) – Shady Side | Northern terminus of MD 468 |
| Anne Arundel | Beverley Beach | 24.97 | 40.19 | Road end | Eastern terminus |
1.000 mi = 1.609 km; 1.000 km = 0.621 mi: Incomplete access

== Auxiliary routes ==
MD 214 has two existing auxiliary routes and one former one.

- MD 214A is the designation for Pike Ridge Road, which runs 0.64 miles (1.03 km) from MD 214 northeast to MD 2 in Edgewater. Pike Ridge Road was part of MD 214 until the highway was relocated on the south side of Edgewater in 1949.
- MD 214B is the designation for the unnamed 0.06-mile (0.097 km) connector between MD 214A and southbound MD 2 south of the junction of the latter two highways. MD 214B was constructed in 2003.
- MD 214C was the designation for the unnamed 0.30-mile (0.48 km) L-shaped connector between Maryland Avenue and MD 2 north of the MD 2–MD 253 intersection in Edgewater. MD 214C was constructed in 2003 and transferred to Anne Arundel County maintenance in 2009.
