= Maryland Route 253 =

State highway in Maryland, U.S.

Maryland Route 253
- Mayo Road
- Maryland Route 253 highlighted in red

Route information
- Maintained by MDSHA
- Length: 1.34 mi (2.16 km)
- Existed: 1927–present
- Tourist routes: Roots and Tides Scenic Byway

Major junctions
- South end: MD 214 in Edgewater
- North end: MD 2 in Edgewater

Location
- Country: United States
- State: Maryland
- Counties: Anne Arundel

Highway system
- Maryland highway system; Interstate; US; State; Scenic Byways
← MD 250	→ MD 254

Maryland Route 253 (MD 253) is a state highway in the U.S. state of Maryland. Known as Mayo Road, the route runs 1.34 miles (2.16 km) from MD 214 north to MD 2 within Edgewater in Anne Arundel County. MD 253 was constructed in Edgewater in the early 1910s and early 1920s. The highway was extended southeast through Mayo to Beverley Beach in the late 1920s and early 1930s. The part of MD 253 southeast of Edgewater became part of MD 214 in 1950.

== Route description ==
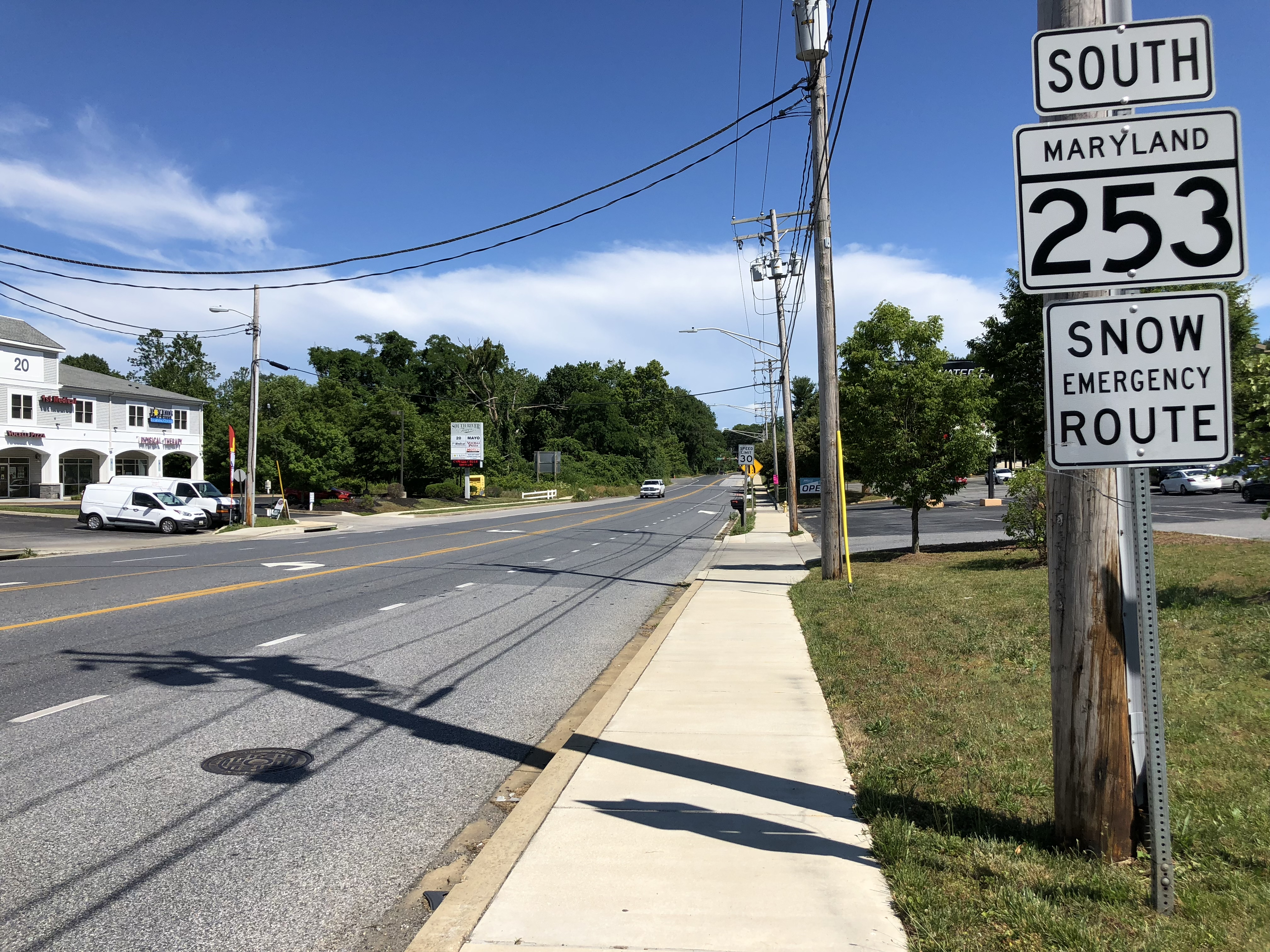
View south at the north end of MD 253 at MD 2 in Edgewater

MD 253 begins at an intersection with MD 214 (Central Avenue) across from the entrance to South River High School. The route heads north as a two-lane undivided road that forms the main street through the Londontowne area of Edgewater. The highway intersects Stepneys Lane and Londontown Road; the latter road leads east to the historic London Town Publik House, located next to the landing of a former ferry across South River. After passing Washington Road, which leads east to Edgewater Elementary School and South River Park, the road turns northwest and reaches its northern terminus at MD 2 (Solomons Island Road) across from the entrance to Lee Airport.

== History ==
When the Maryland State Roads Commission laid out its state road system in 1909, the Annapolis–Prince Frederick road was planned to follow Mayo Road and Stepneys Lane through Edgewater to what is now MD 2's existing course. The road that became MD 2 was instead built along the line it runs now and Mayo Road from that highway to south of Stepneys Lane was built as a 9-foot (2.7 m) wide gravel state-aid road by 1915. The highway was extended as a gravel road to near the present MD 214 intersection by 1921 and to the entrance to Camp Letts by 1923. These extensions were built and the old state-aid road through Edgewater was rebuilt with a width of 15 feet (4.6 m). MD 253 was extended east to Selby-on-the-Bay in 1929 and 1930. The state highway reached MD 214's present terminus in Beverley Beach in 1932.

By 1934, traffic on MD 253 was dense enough that the Maryland State Roads Commission recommended widening the highway from 16 to 20 feet (4.9 to 6.1 m) from Edgewater to Beverley Beach. MD 253 was resurfaced and widened to 30 feet (9.1 m) from MD 2 to Washington Road in 1948 and to 34 feet (10 m) from Washington Road to Stepneys Lane in 1952. MD 214 was extended along a new route from Pike Ridge Road west of MD 2 to MD 253 east of the modern MD 214–MD 253 intersection in 1949. The following year, MD 214 replaced MD 253 on Mayo Road from that junction to Beverley Beach. MD 253's current intersection with MD 214 was built in 1963. The old alignment remained in the state highway system as MD 253A until 2000.

== Junction list ==
The entire route is in Edgewater, Anne Arundel County.

mi	km	Destinations	Notes
0.00	0.00	MD 214 (Central Avenue) – Davidsonville, Mayo	Southern terminus
1.34	2.16	MD 2 (Solomons Island Road) – Solomons, Annapolis	Northern terminus
1.000 mi = 1.609 km; 1.000 km = 0.621 mi

== Auxiliary route ==
MD 253A was the designation for a 0.42-mile (0.68 km) section of Mayo Road bypassed when MD 253's southern terminus was moved to a new intersection with MD 214 in 1963. MD 253A was removed from the state highway system in 2000. Most of the road was physically removed for the construction of a residential subdivision.
