= Maryland Route 332 =

State highway in Maryland, United States

Maryland Route 332
- Maryland Route 332 highlighted in red

Route information
- Maintained by MDSHA
- Length: 1.07 mi (1.72 km)
- Existed: 1970–present

Major junctions
- West end: Central Avenue at the District of Columbia boundary in Capitol Heights
- East end: MD 214 in Seat Pleasant

Location
- Country: United States
- State: Maryland
- Counties: Prince George's

Highway system
- Maryland highway system; Interstate; US; State; Scenic Byways
← MD 331	→ MD 333

Maryland Route 332 (MD 332) is a state highway in the U.S. state of Maryland. Known for most of its length as Central Avenue, the highway runs 1.07 miles (1.72 km) from Southern Avenue at the District of Columbia boundary in Capitol Heights east to MD 214 in Seat Pleasant. MD 332 is the old alignment of MD 214 through Capitol Heights. The highway was constructed in the mid-1910s and bypassed when East Capitol Street was extended east out of Washington, D.C. to Seat Pleasant in the late 1960s.

== Route description ==
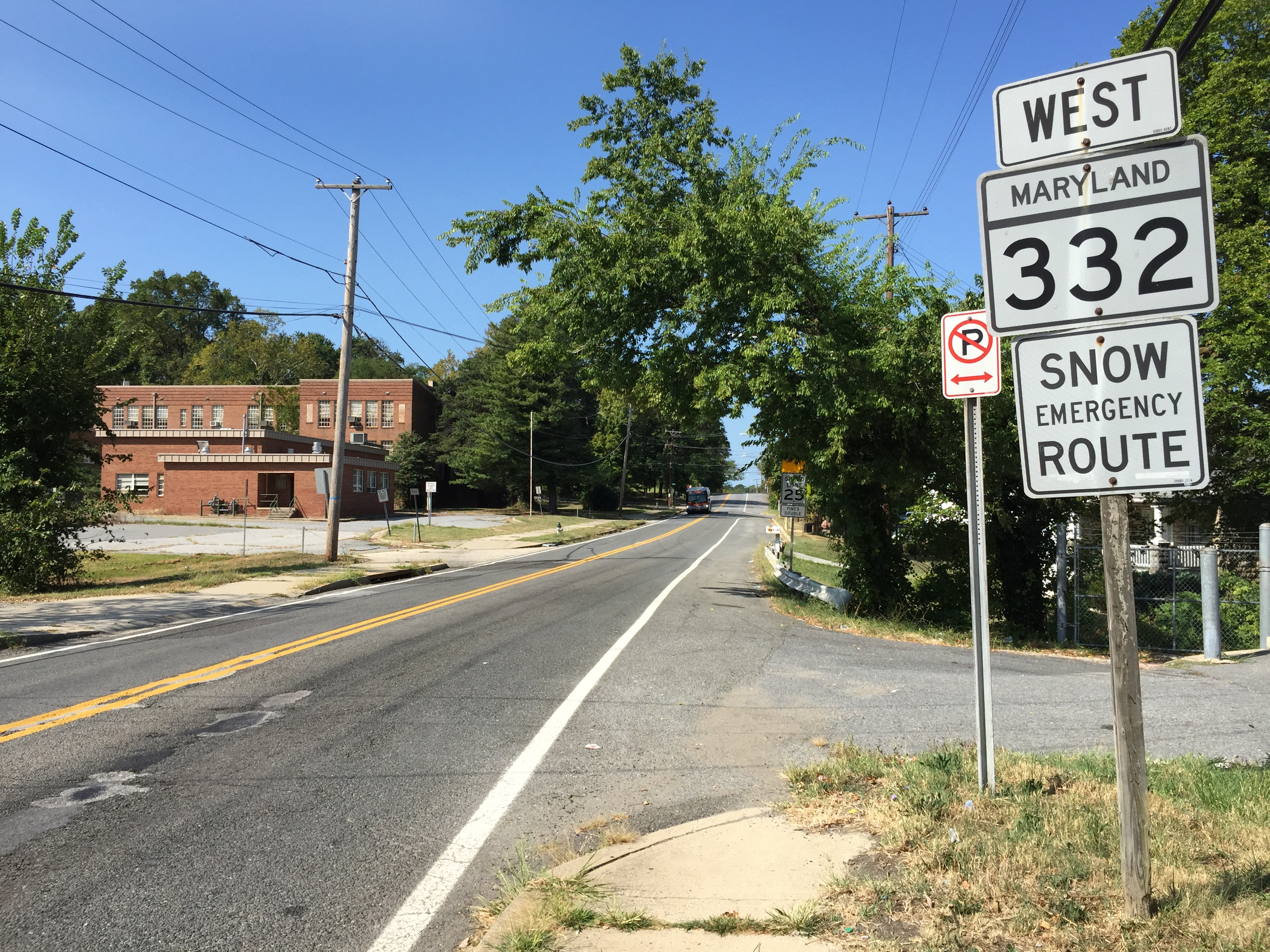
View west at the east end of MD 332 at MD 214 in Seat Pleasant

MD 332 begins at Central Avenue's intersection with Southern Avenue at the District of Columbia boundary. Central Avenue continues west into the Capitol View neighborhood of Washington, D.C., where it intersects East Capitol Street. MD 332 heads east as a two-lane undivided road through the town of Capitol Heights. In the center of town, the highway intersects Larchmont Avenue and Chamber Avenue; the latter leads north to the Capitol Heights station on the Washington Metro's Blue and Silver lines. MD 332 exits the town beyond Tunic Street and continues toward a tangent junction with MD 214. West of the merge, the highway intersects an unnamed spur, MD 332A, that provides full access between MD 332 and MD 214 (East Capitol Street). MD 332 continues as Old Central Avenue and becomes one-way with one eastbound lane just before merging with eastbound MD 214 (Central Avenue) on the southern edge of the city of Seat Pleasant.

== History ==
Central Avenue was paved from Southern Avenue through Capitol Heights to Seat Pleasant as a 14-to-19-foot-wide (4.3 to 5.8 m) concrete road in 1914. This road later became the westernmost portion of MD 214. MD 214 was widened to 20 feet (6.1 m) through Capitol Heights and Seat Pleasant by 1934. The highway was widened by 7 feet (2.1 m) between Capitol Heights and Seat Pleasant in 1948. MD 214 was relocated from Southern Avenue to Seat Pleasant as an extension of East Capitol Street in 1969. The segment of the highway through Capitol Heights was designated MD 332 by 1970.

== Junction list ==
The entire route is in Prince George's County.

Location	mi	km	Destinations	Notes
Capitol Heights	0.00	0.00	Southern Avenue / Central Avenue west – Washington	District of Columbia boundary; western terminus
Seat Pleasant	0.94	1.51	To MD 214 west (East Capitol Street) – Washington	Connector is unsigned MD 332A
Seat Pleasant	1.07	1.72	MD 214 east (Central Avenue) – Largo	Eastern terminus; eastbound ramp only
1.000 mi = 1.609 km; 1.000 km = 0.621 mi: Incomplete access

== Auxiliary route ==
MD 332A is the designation for the 0.04-mile (0.064 km) two-lane undivided connector between MD 214 and MD 332 in Seat Pleasant. MD 332A was assigned to this pre-existing connector in 2008.
