= Lansdale (surname) =

Lansdale is a surname. Notable people with the surname include:

- Edward Lansdale (1908–1987), United States Air Force officer
- Joe Lansdale (footballer) (1894–1977), English footballer
- Joe R. Lansdale (born 1951), American writer and martial arts instructor
- John Lansdale Jr. (1912–2003), United States Army officer
- Kasey Lansdale (born 1988), American musician
- Philip Lansdale (1858–1899), United States Navy officer
- Thomas Lancaster Lansdale (1748–1803), American army officer
