= Karin M. Kettenring =

American plant ecologist

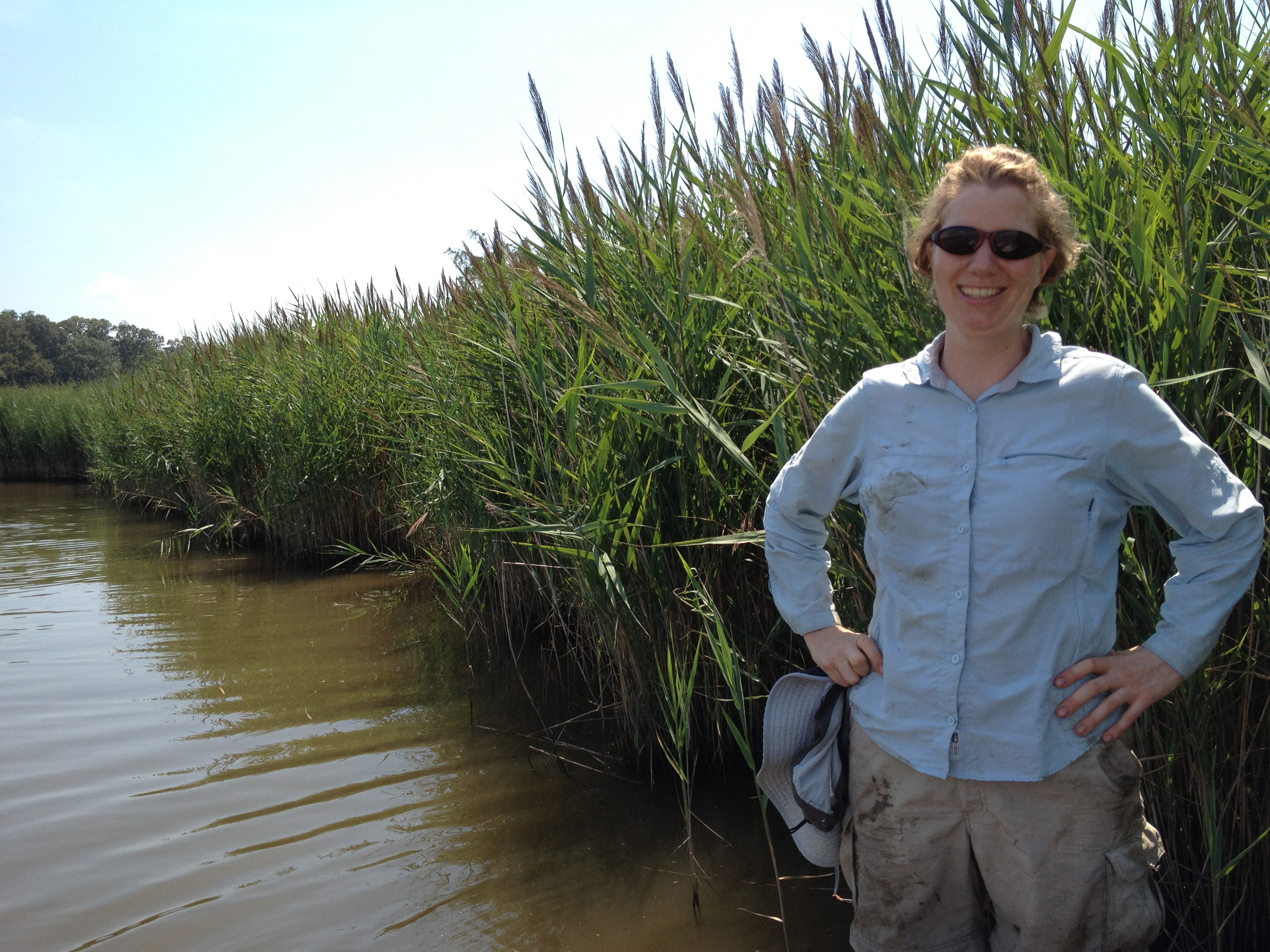
- Dr. Kettenring in the Chesapeake Bay, 2012
- Awards: Quinney College of Natural Resources Undergraduate Research Mentor of the Year, Utah State University (2017); Quinney College of Natural Resources Graduate Mentor of the Year, Utah State University (2020)

Academic background
- Education: University of Minnesota (Ph.D.); Oberlin College (B.A.)
- Doctoral advisor: Susan M. Galatowitsch

Academic work
- Discipline: Plant ecology
- Sub-discipline: Wetland ecology
- Institutions: Smithsonian Environmental Research Center (2006–2008); Utah State University (2008–Present)
- Website: www.karinkettenring.com

Karin M. Kettenring is an American plant ecologist based in Logan, Utah. Her research focuses primarily on aspects of wetland plant ecology, including invasive plant ecology and management, native wetland seeds and seedlings, and wetland restoration. Kettenring worked in several labs and research stations across the United States before obtaining a faculty position at Utah State University as a professor of wetland ecology. Her most cited publication, “Lessons learned from invasive plant control experiments: a systematic review and meta-analysis,” looks at the literature discussing invasives species control experiments and how to ensure that research practices are most effective.

== Early life and education ==
Kettenring grew up in Summit, New Jersey. In school, she enjoyed mathematics and was a part of orchestra and the track team. She attended Oberlin College from 1994 to 1998 and obtained an undergraduate degree in biology. She then interned at the Archbold Biological Station in Lake Placid, Florida from June 1999 to July 2000 where she worked on a project that focused on tracking herbivore activity on the endangered Liatris ohlingerae. From 2000 to 2006, she attended the University of Minnesota, where she received her Ph.D. in Applied Plant Sciences. Her dissertation was titled "Seed ecology of wetland Carex species-implications for restoration." Kettenring's doctoral advisor was Susan M. Galatowitsch.

== Career and research ==
Kettenring began her career as a graduate research assistant during her time at the University of Minnesota. She then conducted post-doctoral research for the Field Museum of Natural History and the Morton Arboretum in 2006 with Andrew Hipp. After that, she was a postdoctoral fellow for the Smithsonian Environmental Research Center in Maryland from 2006 to 2008 where her work focused on the invasion of Phragmites australis in Chesapeake Bay tidal wetlands. Kettenring then moved on to work as a faculty member at Utah State University since 2008. She has taught courses in wetland ecology and management, principles of aquatic ecosystem restoration, ecology and restoration of wetland and riparian plants, and restoration ecology.

Kettenring is the head of the Wetland Ecology Restoration Lab in the Department of Watershed Sciences. The research in her lab focuses on addressing questions relating to the mechanisms and impacts of plant invasions in wetlands. She also studies the restoration of wetlands with a particular focus on seed and seedling ecology as well as the importance of diversity to wetland functioning. Many of her research projects are conducted in collaboration with wetland managers to ensure that research outputs can inform and improve wetland management and restoration. Her research is conducted in freshwater and brackish wetlands around Utah (especially Great Salt Lake and Utah Lake) as well as in the Chesapeake Bay, Suisun Marsh in California, and the Platte River in Nebraska. She previously conducted research in the prairie pothole wetlands of Minnesota and Iowa.

Kettenring's professional life extends beyond her work at the university to include participation in several professional societies. She served as treasurer in the Society for Ecological Restoration Great Basin Chapter from 2014 to 2016. In addition, she served as chair of the Society of Wetland Scientists Women in Wetlands Section from 2017 to 2018. Kettenring has served as the at-large director for the Society for Ecological Restoration, International Network for Seed-based Restoration since 2018. She is also affiliated with the Ecological Society of America.

== Selected publications ==
- Adams, S.M. Hovick, N.O. Anderson, and K.M. Kettenring. 2021. We can better manage ecosystems by connecting solutions to constraints: Learning from wetland plant invasions. Frontiers in Environmental Science 9:715350. https://doi.org/10.3389%2Ffenvs.2021.715350
- Kettenring, K.M. and E.E. Tarsa. 2020. Need to seed? Ecological, genetic, and evolutionary keys to seed-based wetland restoration. Frontiers in Environmental Science, 8 (109): 1-30. https://doi.org/10.3389%2Ffenvs.2020.00109
- Rohal, C.B., K.M. Kettenring, K. Sims, E.L.G. Hazelton, and Z. Ma. 2018. Surveying managers to inform a regionally relevant invasive Phragmites australis research program. Journal of Environmental Management, 206: 807–816. https://doi.org/10.1016%2Fj.jenvman.2017.10.049
- Kettenring, K.M., K.L. Mercer, C. Reinhardt Adams, and J. Hines. 2014. Application of genetic diversity-ecosystem function research to ecological restoration. Journal of Applied Ecology, 51: 339–348. https://doi.org/10.1111%2F1365-2664.12202
- Kettenring, Karin M.; Mercer, Kristin L.; Reinhardt Adams, Carrie; Hines, Jes (28 November 2013). Wilsey, Brian (ed.). "EDITOR'S CHOICE: Application of genetic diversity-ecosystem function research to ecological restoration". Journal of Applied Ecology. 51 (2): 339–348. doi:10.1111/1365-2664.12202

== Awards and honors ==
Kettenring was awarded the Quinney College of Natural Resources Undergraduate Research Mentor of the Year in 2017 along with the Quinney College of Natural Resources Graduate Mentor of the Year in 2020.
