= Smithsonian Environmental Research Center =

Research center in Edgewater, Maryland, U.S.

Coordinates: 38.88662°N 76.54265°W

- Established: 1964; 62 years ago
- Location: Edgewater, Maryland, U.S.
- Type: Research Center
- Director: William "Monty" Graham
- Website: www.serc.si.edu

The Smithsonian Environmental Research Center (SERC) is a United States 2,650-acre (10.7 km^{2}) environmental research and educational facility operated by the Smithsonian Institution. It is located on the Rhode and West Rivers near Edgewater in Anne Arundel County, Maryland, United States, near the western shore of the Chesapeake Bay. Research at SERC includes long-term experiments and global data synthesis to understand the ecosystem function of forests, farms, and coasts. Research at SERC is applied to inform real-world decision-making over local to international scales.

== History ==
In 1964, Robert Lee Forrest of Baltimore left a 365-acre dairy farm on the Rhode River to the Smithsonian Institution. The next year, the Chesapeake Center for Field Biology was established on the site of this former dairy farm. A $375,000 grant from the Ford Foundation was awarded and another $550,000 in other grants followed by the end of 1969. These funds were used to purchase another 568 additional acres adjoining the original parcel.

In 1970, the Chesapeake Bay Center for Field Biology was renamed to the Chesapeake Bay Center for Environmental Studies (CBCES) and land acquisition continued. In 1974, Jim Lynch was hired as the first on-site staff scientist. Lynch had recently finished his Ph.D. from University of California, Berkeley in Zoology.

== Site ==
The 2,600-acre site occupied by SERC contains coastal plain forests, land used for agriculture, wetlands and marshes, and brackish environments.

== Research ==
SERC conducts research on topics that include terrestrial, atmospheric, and estuarine environmental research within the disciplines of botany, ecology, environmental education, biology, chemistry, mathematics, microbiology, physics, and zoology. The center trains interns and graduate students, including pre-doctoral and doctoral students. Annually, the center receives over 10,000 students, teachers, and families who come to visit. It gives advice, consultation, and testimony to local, state, federal, and international governmental agencies, natural resource managers, policy makers, and conservation organizations.

The facility serves as a center of research and education on human impacts in land-sea interactions of the coastal zone. The center receives $20,000,000 in extramural grants and contracts funded from governmental agencies, foundations, and industry.

SERC developed and maintains an extensive database of invasive species in marine and estuarine ecosystems. The database tracks details on over 500 invasive species throughout coastal North America. SERC coordinates with the United States Geological Survey, which has developed a similar database for freshwater invasions, and has worked with marine centers in other nations to study marine invasions.

== Technical innovation ==
The center has been an innovator of biotelemetry to track behavior, habitat use, and movement of blue crabs (Callinectes sapidus), a marine predator and a valuable crustacean fishery in North America. They are the patent holder for the Spectral Radiometer, the national standard for monitoring solar radiation. The center has developed a model for testing estuarine water quality and watershed nutrient discharges.
