= Beverly Beach =

Beverly Beach may refer to:

- Beverly Beach, Florida
- Beverley Beach, Maryland
- Beverly Beach, Oregon
- Beverly Beach State Park in Oregon

== See also ==
- Bert Beverly Beach (1928–2022), Swiss-born American Adventist theologian
