= Emma Giles =

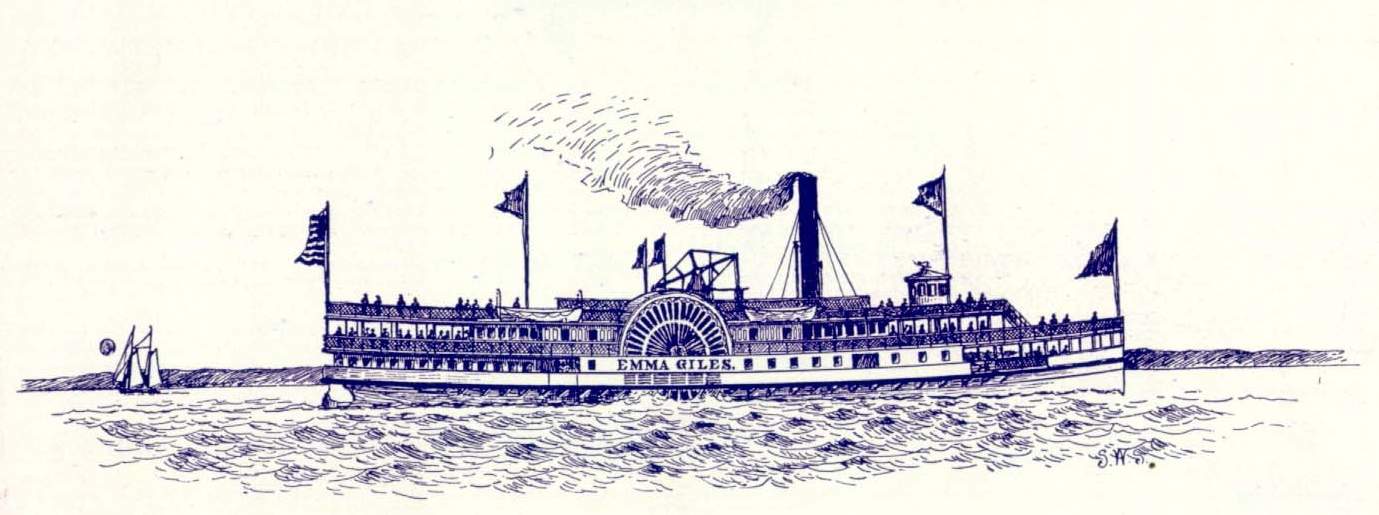
- Emma Giles

History
- Name: Emma Giles
- Owner: Capt. George F. Curlett
- Operator: Tolchester Company
- Route: Baltimore, Maryland to points on the Chesapeake Bay including Annapolis, Maryland, Tolchester Beach, Maryland, West River, Maryland, Port Deposit, Maryland
- Builder: William Woodall Shipyard
- Completed: 1887
- In service: 1887-1936
- Fate: burned

General characteristics
- Tonnage: 549
- Length: 178
- Beam: 30
- Propulsion: steam
- Capacity: 1500 people

The Emma Giles was the best known and most popular sidewheel passenger steamer that operated out of Baltimore, Maryland.

== Destinations ==
One of her more popular destinations was Tolchester Beach, Maryland.

She docked at the Nowell pier on Parrish Creek and later at the Shady Side pier when serving the West River. The Emma Giles made two trips per week between Baltimore and Shady Side, but by the 1930s, it increased its service to five trips per week.

She served the Rhode River between 1891 and 1932, making five trips per week.

In Annapolis, Maryland, she docked at a wharf at the foot of Prince George Street.

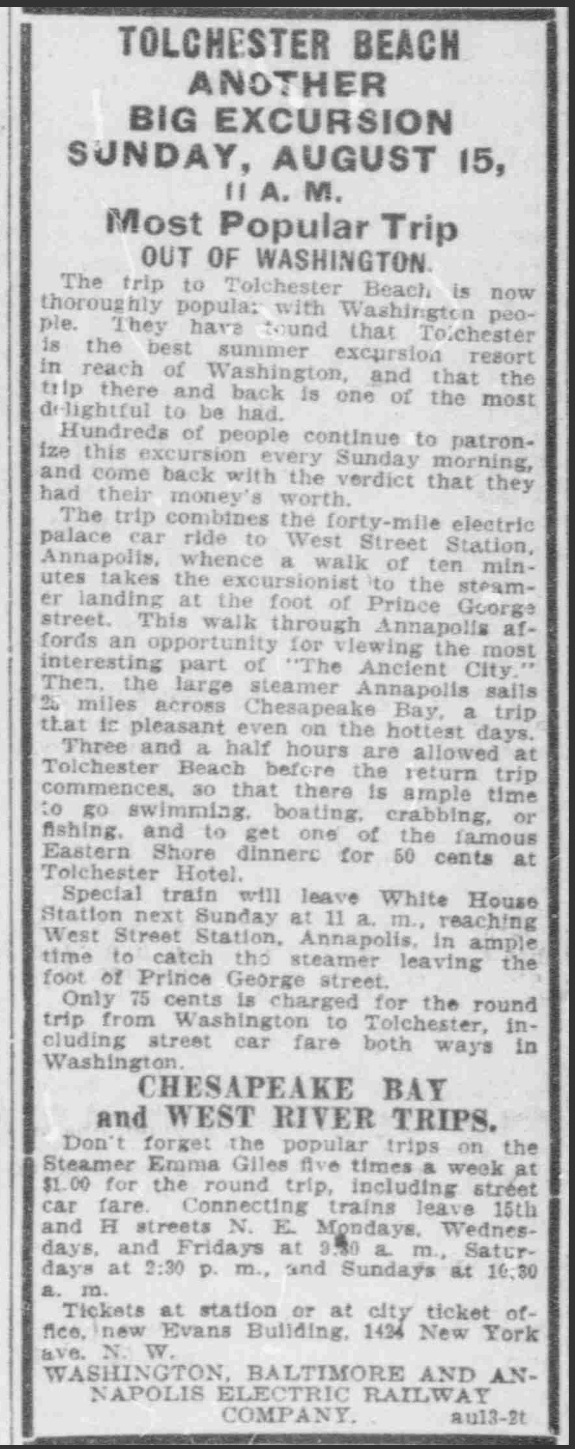
Advertisement for an Emma Giles Excursion in conjunction with the Washington, Baltimore and Annapolis Electric Railway

== Collision ==
On New Year's Day 1924, the Emma Giles collided with an ocean-going freighter, the SS Steel Trader owned by U.S. Steel in heavy fog near the Little Choptank River. The Emma Giles sustained damage on her starboard side, including her paddle. 52 passengers were aboard at the time but none were injured. She was towed back to Baltimore by the tug Brittania, repaired and returned to service.

== Fate ==
After ending service as a steamer, she functioned as a barge, then a breakwater. Eventually, the Emma Giles was towed up the Patapsco River and Curtis Creek beyond the Pennington Avenue Bridge and burned to facilitate salvage of metal parts. As of 2005, its stern was still visible and had been spray painted with a sign that says "Free to good home." Its ship's wheel is mounted on the wall in the Memorial Hall of Galesville, MD.
