= Joe Lansdale =

Joe Lansdale may refer to:

- Joe R. Lansdale (born 1951), American writer and martial arts instructor
- Joe Lansdale (footballer) (1894–1977), English football goalkeeper

== See also ==
- Joe Lonsdale (born 1982/3), American entrepreneur and venture capitalist
