= US-Asia Institute =

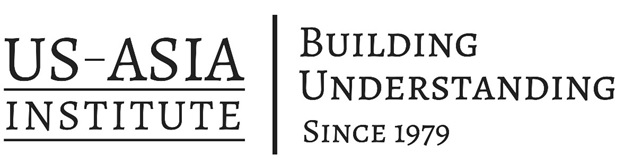
- Abbreviation: USAI
- Formation: 1979
- Type: NGO
- Headquarters: 232 East Capitol Street NE
- Location: Washington, D.C.
- Chairman: Glenn Lau-Kee
- President: Mary Sue Bissell
- Website: usasiainstitute.org

The US-Asia Institute (USAI) is a private United Nations-recognized non-governmental organization. The institute was founded in 1979 by Esther G. Kee and the late Joji Konoshima. USAI strives to improve and strengthen the relations between the people and governments of the United States and Asia.

The institute was officially established following the first national gathering of representatives from Asian communities at the White House in 1978. The meeting was held due to a shared community concern over the misconceptions and negative stereotypes of Asia held by many Americans at the time. With the formal support of both President Jimmy Carter and then Assistant Secretary of State for East Asian and Pacific Affairs, the Richard Holbrooke, the National Advisory Council for East Asian and Pacific Affairs was formed to provide input to the State Department.

It now works extensively to create, assist with, and facilitate congressional delegations and briefings for congressional staff. As well as hosting conferences, panels, and receptions in close collaboration with the US and Asian governments to further strengthen relations in Washington DC and internationally.
