= Thomas Lancaster Lansdale =

Continental Army officer (1748–1803)

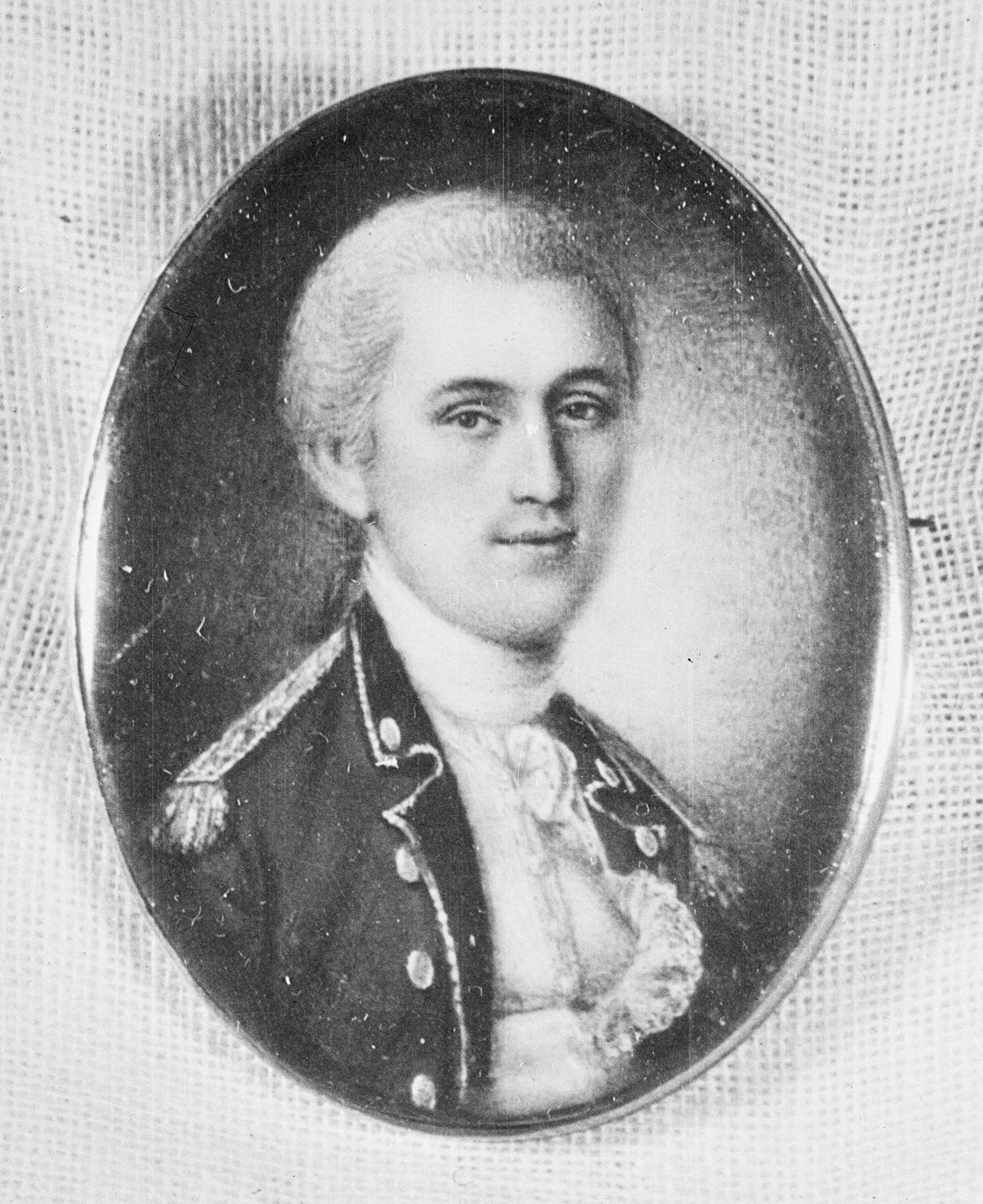
- Born: November 10, 1748
- Died: January 19, 1803
- Burial place: Bowie, Maryland, US
- Military career
- Service years: 1776-1783
- Rank: Major
- Unit: 3rd Maryland Continental Infantry

Major Thomas Lancaster Lansdale (November 10, 1748 – January 19, 1803) was an American soldier who served as an officer in the Continental Army during the Revolutionary War.

== Military service ==
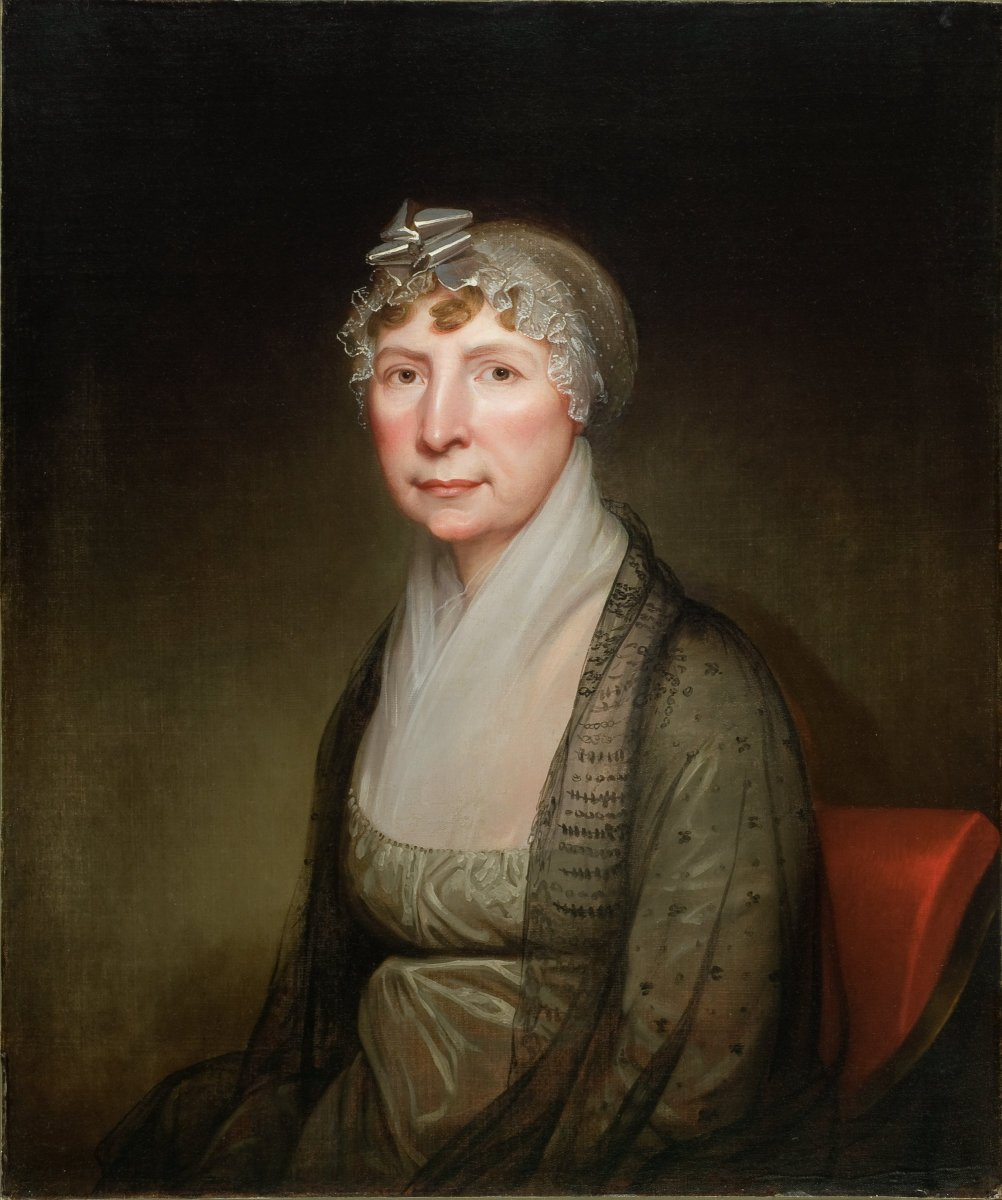
Portrait of Cornelia Van Horn Lansdale (Mrs. Thomas Lancaster Lansdale) by Rembrandt Peale

He served in the Continental Army from 1776 through 1783 as an officer in the 3rd Maryland Continental Infantry.

On January 25, 1783, Lansdale was berated in writing by George Washington for the shabby appearance of the troops under his command while encamped on the banks of the Hudson River. Lansdale redeemed himself two weeks later with Washington who then wrote:

It gave me very sensible pleasure to observe at the

Review yesterday the very great alteration for the better in the appearance of the Maryland Detachment ... I anticipate the day when this Detachment will rival if not surpass in

excellence the oldest & best Troops in the American Service.

At the conclusion of the war, Lansdale was admitted as an original member of the Society of the Cincinnati of Maryland.

== Business ==
Outside of military service, he was a merchant with the firm of Lansdale and Claggett in the port town of Queen Anne and owned a sizeable tobacco plantation in Prince George's County. He made his home at Hazelwood, overlooking Queen Anne.

== Family ==
His father was Isaac Lansdale. His wife was Cornelia Van Horn Lansdale.

== Legacy ==
His grave in Collington, Maryland (now Bowie) is marked by a municipal park and a boulevard named in his honor.
