= Mayo, Maryland =

- Census-designated place
- Location of Mayo, Maryland
- Coordinates: 38°53′36″N 76°30′16″W
- Country: United States
- State: Maryland
- County: Anne Arundel

Government
  - Mayor: Andrew Burton

Area
  - Total: 9.44 sq mi (24.46 km^{2})
  - Land: 5.62 sq mi (14.55 km^{2})
  - Water: 3.82 sq mi (9.90 km^{2})
- Elevation: 13 ft (4 m)

Population (2020)
  - Total: 8,832
  - Density: 1,571.7/sq mi (606.83/km^{2})
- Time zone: UTC−5 (Eastern (EST))
  - Summer (DST): UTC−4 (EDT)
- ZIP code: 21106
- Area codes: 410, 443, and 667
- FIPS code: 24-51575
- GNIS feature ID: 0590767

Mayo is a census-designated place (CDP) in Anne Arundel County, Maryland, United States. The population was 8,298 in the 2010 census. The Mayo CDP of 2010 includes all of the area that used to be counted as the Selby-on-the-Bay CDP. The beach in Mayo used to be a popular weekend resort.

== Geography ==
Mayo is located at 38°53′36″N 76°30′16″W,(38.893264, −76.504371) south of Annapolis. It occupies a peninsula between the South River to the northeast and the Rhode River to the southwest, both of which are tidal arms of the Chesapeake Bay. It is bordered by the CDP of Edgewater to the northwest, and (across the South River) by the CDP of Annapolis Neck to the northeast. Saunder's Point, Shoreham Beach, Beverly Beach, Cloverlea, Turkey Point, Holly Hill Harbor, Selby Beach, and Cape Loch Haven are some of the neighborhoods found in Mayo.

Maryland Route 214 is the main road through the center of the CDP, coming to its eastern end in Beverly Beach on the Chesapeake Bay.

According to the United States Census Bureau, the CDP has a total area of 9.5 square miles (24.5 km^{2}), of which 5.6 square miles (14.6 km^{2}) is land and 3.8 square miles (9.9 km^{2}), or 40.47%, is water.

== Demographics ==
Historical population
Census	Pop.	Note	%±
2010	8,298		—
2020	8,832		6.4%
U.S. Decennial Census

=== 2020 census ===
As of the 2020 census, Mayo had a population of 8,832. The median age was 42.6 years. 22.8% of residents were under the age of 18 and 15.7% of residents were 65 years of age or older. For every 100 females there were 97.4 males, and for every 100 females age 18 and over there were 96.9 males age 18 and over.

99.4% of residents lived in urban areas, while 0.6% lived in rural areas.

There were 3,263 households in Mayo, of which 34.5% had children under the age of 18 living in them. Of all households, 60.7% were married-couple households, 14.9% were households with a male householder and no spouse or partner present, and 18.0% were households with a female householder and no spouse or partner present. About 19.4% of all households were made up of individuals and 8.5% had someone living alone who was 65 years of age or older.

There were 3,534 housing units, of which 7.7% were vacant. The homeowner vacancy rate was 1.6% and the rental vacancy rate was 6.3%.

Racial composition as of the 2020 census
Race	Number	Percent
White	7,761	87.9%
Black or African American	127	1.4%
American Indian and Alaska Native	28	0.3%
Asian	126	1.4%
Native Hawaiian and Other Pacific Islander	3	0.0%
Some other race	160	1.8%
Two or more races	627	7.1%
Hispanic or Latino (of any race)	472	5.3%

=== 2010 census ===
Population by Race in Mayo Maryland (2010)
Race	Population	% of Total
Total	8,298	100
White	7,790	93
Hispanic	266	3
Two or More Races	166	2
African American	144	1

=== 2000 census ===
As of the census of 2000, there were 3,153 people, 1,195 households, and 862 families residing in the CDP. The population density was 1,243.8 inhabitants per square mile (480.2/km^{2}). There were 1,303 housing units at an average density of 514.0 per square mile (198.5/km^{2}). The racial makeup of the CDP was 96.32% White, 1.27% African American, 0.51% Native American, 0.67% Asian, 0.03% Pacific Islander, 0.19% from other races, and 1.01% from two or more races. Hispanic or Latino of any race were 1.78% of the population.

There were 1,195 households, out of which 33.2% had children under the age of 18 living with them, 61.6% were married couples living together, 6.5% had a female householder with no husband present, and 27.8% were non-families. 20.7% of all households were made up of individuals, and 6.5% had someone living alone who was 65 years of age or older. The average household size was 2.64 and the average family size was 3.06.

In the CDP, the population was spread out, with 25.0% under the age of 18, 5.3% from 18 to 24, 32.0% from 25 to 44, 26.4% from 45 to 64, and 11.3% who were 65 years of age or older. The median age was 38 years. For every 100 females, there were 99.2 males. For every 100 females age 18 and over, there were 98.2 males.

The median income for a household in the CDP was $70,909, and the median income for a family was $81,634. Males had a median income of $47,500 versus $36,450 for females. The per capita income for the CDP was $30,552. About 1.8% of families and 2.8% of the population were below the poverty line, including 3.1% of those under age 18 and 3.1% of those age 65 or over.

== History ==
Mayo takes its name from Commodore Isaac Mayo, who distinguished himself in the Mexican–American War. Commodore Mayo held a large tract of land on the South River, known in the early 1900s as "Mayo's Neck", that had been the home estate of Captain Nicholas Gassaway, the son of Maryland politician Colonel Nicholas Gassaway. His home, known as Gresham, was listed on the National Register of Historic Places in 1990. Martenet's 1860 map of Anne Arundel County, Maryland shows the place name for this area to be "Scrabble Town" previous to the change to Mayo.

== Notable people ==
- Jacob Bender, American football player
- Phillip D. Bissett, American politician, MD House of Delegates
