= Kettering, Maryland =

- Census-designated place
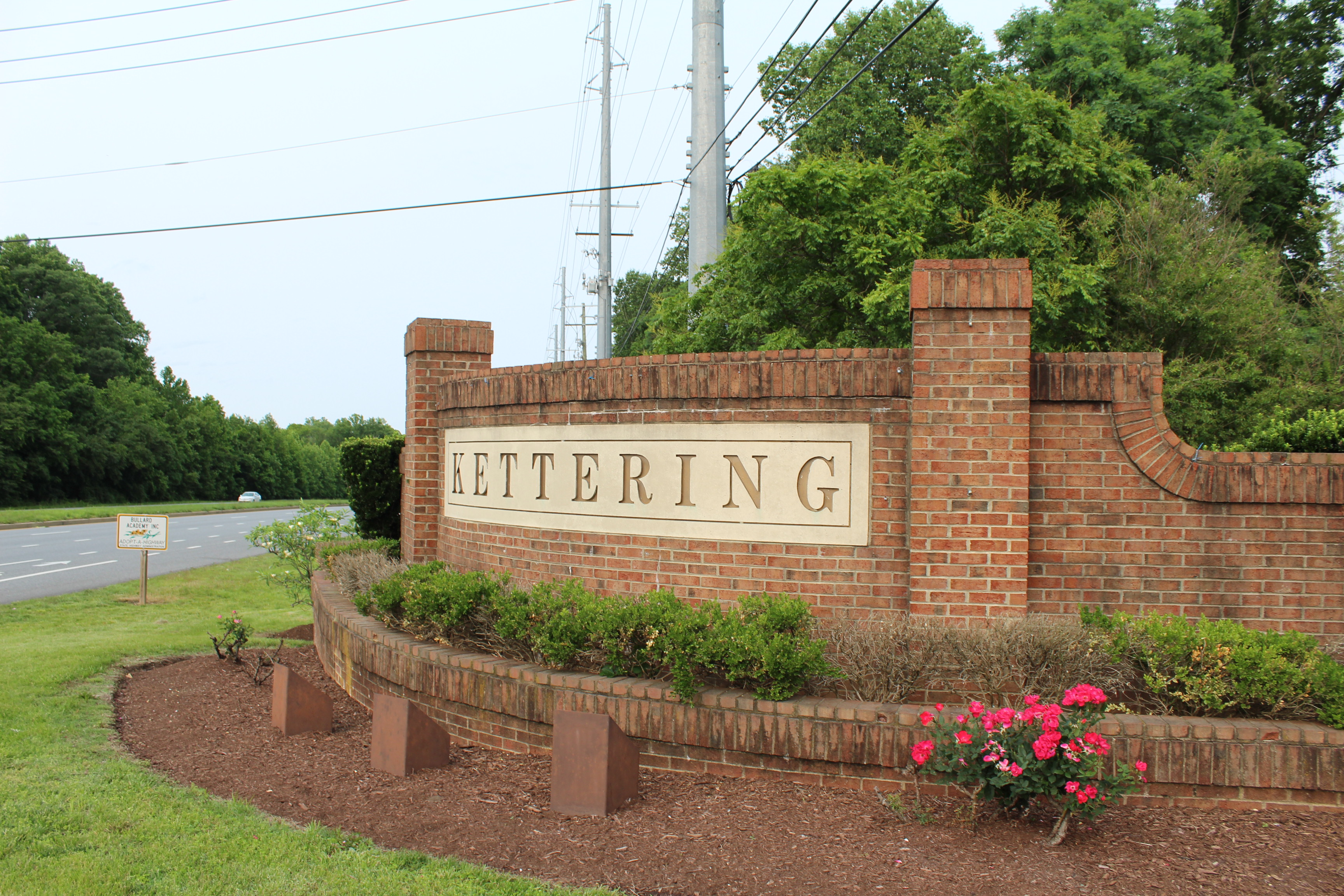
- Sign for Kettering at the intersection of Maryland Route 214 and Kettering Drive

- Location of Kettering, Maryland
- Coordinates: 38°53′42″N 76°47′47″W
- Country: United States
- State: Maryland
- County: Prince George's

Area
  - Total: 5.51 sq mi (14.28 km^{2})
  - Land: 5.49 sq mi (14.23 km^{2})
  - Water: 0.019 sq mi (0.05 km^{2})
- Elevation: 138 ft (42 m)

Population (2020)
  - Total: 14,424
  - Density: 2,625.7/sq mi (1,013.79/km^{2})
- Time zone: UTC−5 (Eastern (EST))
  - Summer (DST): UTC−4 (EDT)
- ZIP codes: 20774-20775
- Area codes: 301, 240
- FIPS code: 24-43900
- GNIS feature ID: 1714445

Kettering is an unincorporated area and census-designated place in Prince George's County, Maryland, United States. At the 2020 United States census, the population was 14,424. Kettering is adjacent to Prince George's Community College, the upscale gated community of Woodmore, Six Flags America, Evangel Temple megachurch, and the community of Largo at the end of the Washington Metro’s Blue and Silver Lines. Watkins Regional Park in Kettering offers a large playground, a colorful carousel, miniature golf, a miniature train ride, and various animals.

== Etymology ==
The name Kettering was chosen by a suburban housing developer in the 1960s when development began.

== Geography ==
Kettering is located at 38°53′42″N 76°47′47″W.

According to the United States Census Bureau, the CDP has a total area of 5.5 square miles (14 km^{2}), all land.

== Demographics ==
Historical population
Census	Pop.	Note	%±
2000	11,008		—
2010	12,790		16.2%
2020	14,424		12.8%
U.S. Decennial Census; 2010 2020

=== Racial and ethnic composition ===
Kettering CDP, Maryland – Racial and ethnic composition Note: the US Census treats Hispanic/Latino as an ethnic category. This table excludes Latinos from the racial categories and assigns them to a separate category. Hispanics/Latinos may be of any race.
Race / Ethnicity (NH = Non-Hispanic)	Pop 2000	Pop 2010	Pop 2020	% 2000	% 2010	% 2020
White alone (NH)	611	368	308	5.55%	2.88%	2.14%
Black or African American alone (NH)	9,935	11,675	12,976	90.25%	91.28%	89.96%
Native American or Alaska Native alone (NH)	21	15	11	0.19%	0.12%	0.08%
Asian alone (NH)	136	241	207	1.24%	1.88%	1.44%
Native Hawaiian or Pacific Islander alone (NH)	0	5	1	0.00%	0.04%	0.01%
Other race alone (NH)	25	27	59	0.23%	0.21%	0.41%
Mixed race or Multiracial (NH)	175	220	400	1.59%	1.72%	2.77%
Hispanic or Latino (any race)	105	239	462	0.95%	1.87%	3.20%
Total	11,008	12,790	14,424	100.00%	100.00%	100.00%

=== 2020 census ===
As of the 2020 census, Kettering had a population of 14,424. The median age was 45.7 years. 19.8% of residents were under the age of 18 and 22.4% were 65 years of age or older. For every 100 females, there were 76.0 males, and for every 100 females age 18 and over, there were 71.1 males.

100.0% of residents lived in urban areas, while 0.0% lived in rural areas.

There were 5,502 households, of which 28.7% had children under the age of 18 living in them. Of all households, 39.5% were married-couple households, 13.3% were households with a male householder and no spouse or partner present, and 43.4% were households with a female householder and no spouse or partner present. About 29.4% of all households were made up of individuals, and 16.0% had someone living alone who was 65 years of age or older.

There were 5,666 housing units, of which 2.9% were vacant. The homeowner vacancy rate was 1.0% and the rental vacancy rate was 5.9%.

=== 2000 Census ===
As of the 2000 census, there were 11,008 people, 3,814 households, and 2,955 families residing in the CDP. The population density was 2,016.5 inhabitants per square mile (778.6/km^{2}). There were 3,958 housing units at an average density of 725.0 per square mile (279.9/km^{2}). The racial makeup of the CDP was 5.78% White, 90.62% African American, 0.19% Native American, 1.24% Asian, 0.47% from other races, and 1.71% from two or more races. Hispanic or Latino of any race were 0.95% of the population.

There were 3,814 households, out of which 36.3% had children under the age of 18 living with them, 50.0% were married couples living together, 23.3% had a female householder with no husband present, and 22.5% were non-families. 18.4% of all households were made up of individuals, and 1.7% had someone living alone who was 65 years of age or older. The average household size was 2.86 and the average family size was 3.24.

In the CDP, the population was spread out, with 26.6% under the age of 18, 7.1% from 18 to 24, 30.6% from 25 to 44, 29.1% from 45 to 64, and 6.6% who were 65 years of age or older. The median age was 37 years. For every 100 females, there were 81.3 males. For every 100 females age 18 and over, there were 75.8 males.

The median income for a household in the CDP was $78,735, and the median income for a family was $82,777. Males had a median income of $47,059 versus $45,243 for females. The per capita income for the CDP was $30,398. About 0.8% of families and 1.9% of the population were below the poverty line, including 1.9% of those under age 18 and 2.0% of those age 65 or over. By the end of 2020, the CDP ranks # 6 among top 10 richest black communities in US, with an average family income of $107,008.

Kettering was majority white for much of its history. While majority white in the 1970 census, Kettering was 49% white by 1980 and only 17% white by 1990. The white population quickly declined as the community became majority African-American.

== Government and infrastructure ==
Prince George's County Police Department District 2 Station in Brock Hall CDP, with a Bowie postal address, serves the community.

The U.S. Postal Service operates the Kettering Post Office in Kettering CDP.

== Education ==
Kettering is a part of the Prince George's County Public Schools.

Kettering, Perrywood, and Lake Arbor elementary schools serve sections of the Kettering CDP. Almost all of the CDP is zoned to Kettering Middle School, with a portion zoned to Ernest Everett Just Middle School. Most of the CDP is zoned to Largo High School while a portion is zoned to Dr. Henry A. Wise Jr. High School.

Kettering is served by the Largo-Kettering Branch of the Prince George's County Memorial Library System in Largo.
