= Rhode River =

River in Maryland, USA

Coordinates: 38°52′33″N 76°31′14″W

The Rhode River is a 3-mile-long (5 km) tidal tributary of the West River in Anne Arundel County, Maryland. It is south of the South River.

These are its named tidal creeks and coves starting at the upper end and going clockwise, with a lower-order tributary listed after the "&" symbol:

- Muddy Creek
- Fox Creek
- Sheephead Cove
- Sellman Creek
- Bear Neck Creek & Whitemarsh Creek
- Cadle Creek
- Boathouse Cove

YMCA Camp Letts sits on a peninsula at the northern end of the Rhode River, and the Smithsonian Environmental Research Center occupies most of the northwestern shore of the Rhode River.

== Carrs Wharf ==
Carrs Wharf is a community park on the Rhode River.

== Early settlement ==
Rhode River Hundred is listed in records of some of the earliest settlements in the Province of Maryland. In 1651, Robert Harwood surveyed Harwood Plantation on the Rhode River. A deed was written by Thomas Harwood of Streatley, Berks County (Berkshire), England to his son Richard Harwood for Hookers Purchase at the head of Muddy Creek.

The steamboat Emma Giles served the Rhode River between 1891 and 1932, making five trips per week.

== See also ==
- List of Maryland rivers
- West/Rhode Riverkeeper web site
- Maryland DNR Surf your watershed, Rhode & West
