= Summer Hill (Davidsonville, Maryland) =

Historic house in Maryland, United States

- U.S. National Register of Historic Places
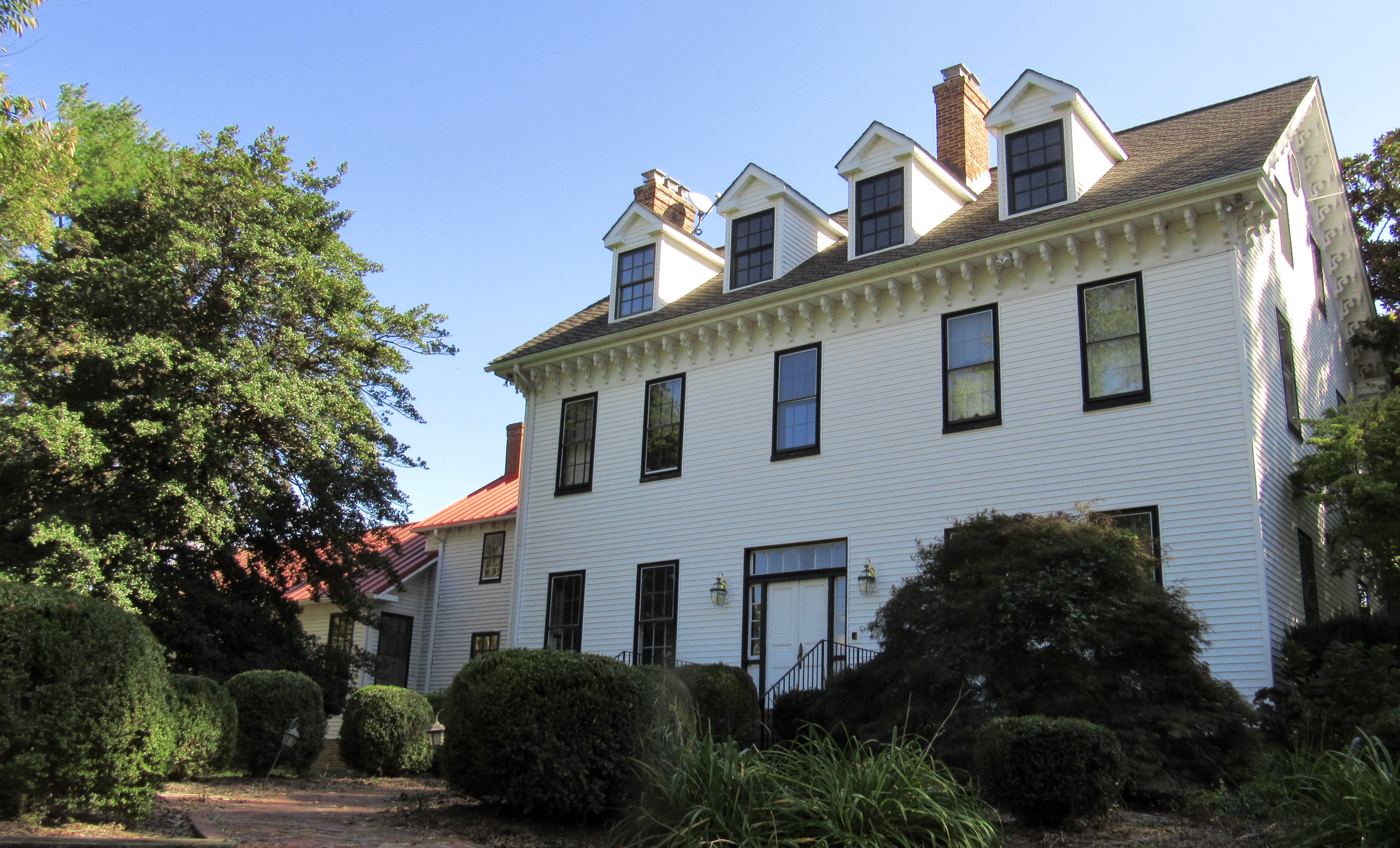
- Front view of Summer Hill

- Location within Maryland Location within the United States
- Nearest city: Davidsonville, Maryland
- Coordinates: 38°55′15″N 76°36′25″W
- Built: 1840
- Architectural style: Greek Revival, Federal, Georgian
- NRHP reference No.: 74000940
- Added to NRHP: July 25, 1974

Summer Hill is a historic home at Davidsonville, Anne Arundel County, Maryland. It is a 2 1/2-story frame dwelling, five bays wide and two deep. It represents a typical Maryland farmhouse of the mid 19th century. The exterior is in transition between mid-19th-century style, broadly derived from Greek Revival architecture, and an earlier style derived from Federal-Georgian sources.

It was listed on the National Register of Historic Places in 1974.

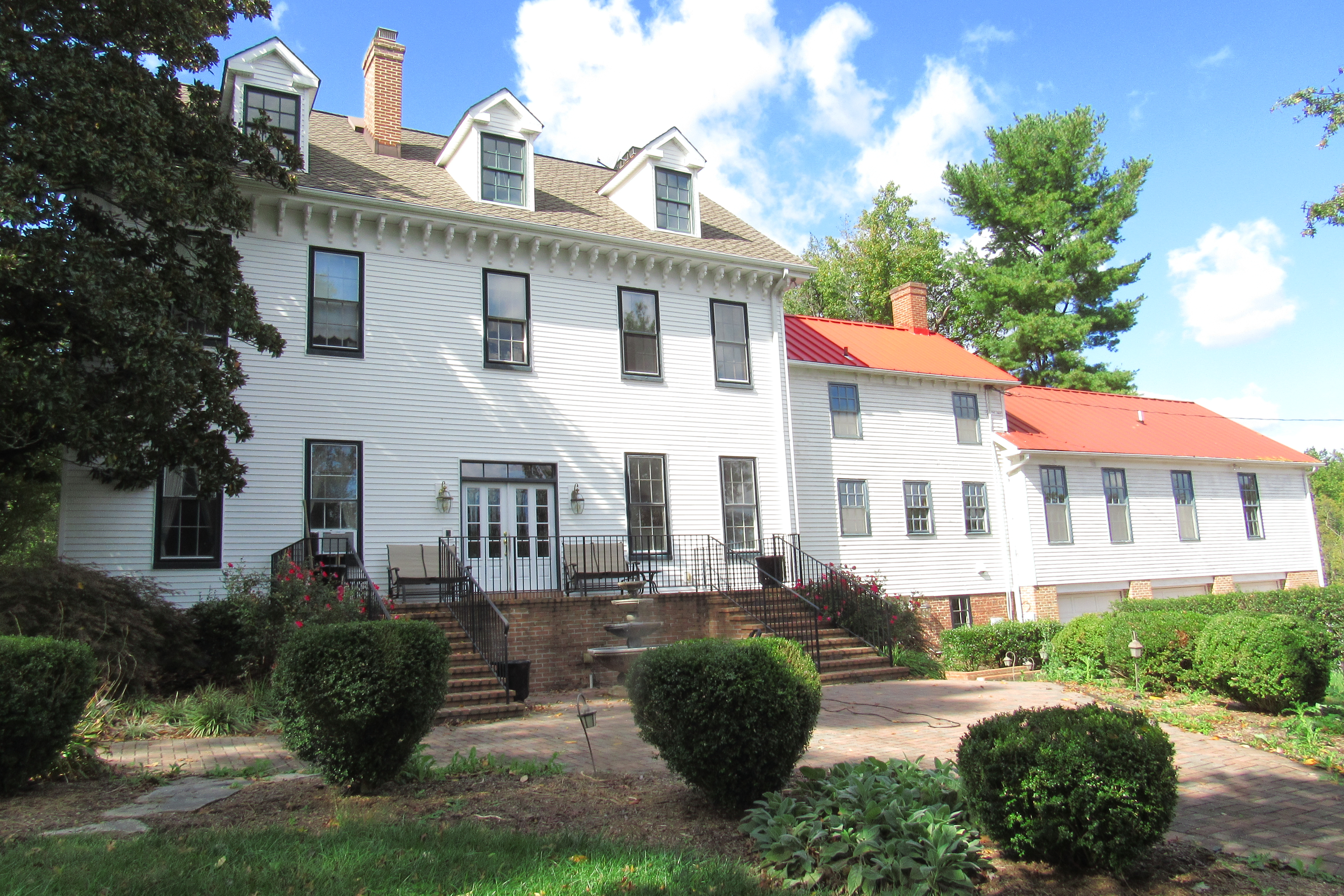
Rear view of Summer Hill
