= Saunders Point, Maryland =

Unincorporated community in Maryland, United States

- Unincorporated community
- Location within the state of Maryland Saunders Point, Maryland (the United States)
- Coordinates: 38°53′15″N 76°29′32″W
- Country: United States
- State: Maryland
- County: Anne Arundel
- Time zone: UTC-5 (Eastern (EST))
  - Summer (DST): UTC-4 (EDT)
- GNIS feature ID: 583199

Saunders Point is an unincorporated community in Anne Arundel County, Maryland, United States.

== Schools ==
- Mayo Elementary School
- Central Elementary School
- Central Middle School
- South River High School
