= East Capitol Street =

Street in Washington, D.C., U.S.

- East Capitol Street NE; East Capitol Street SE
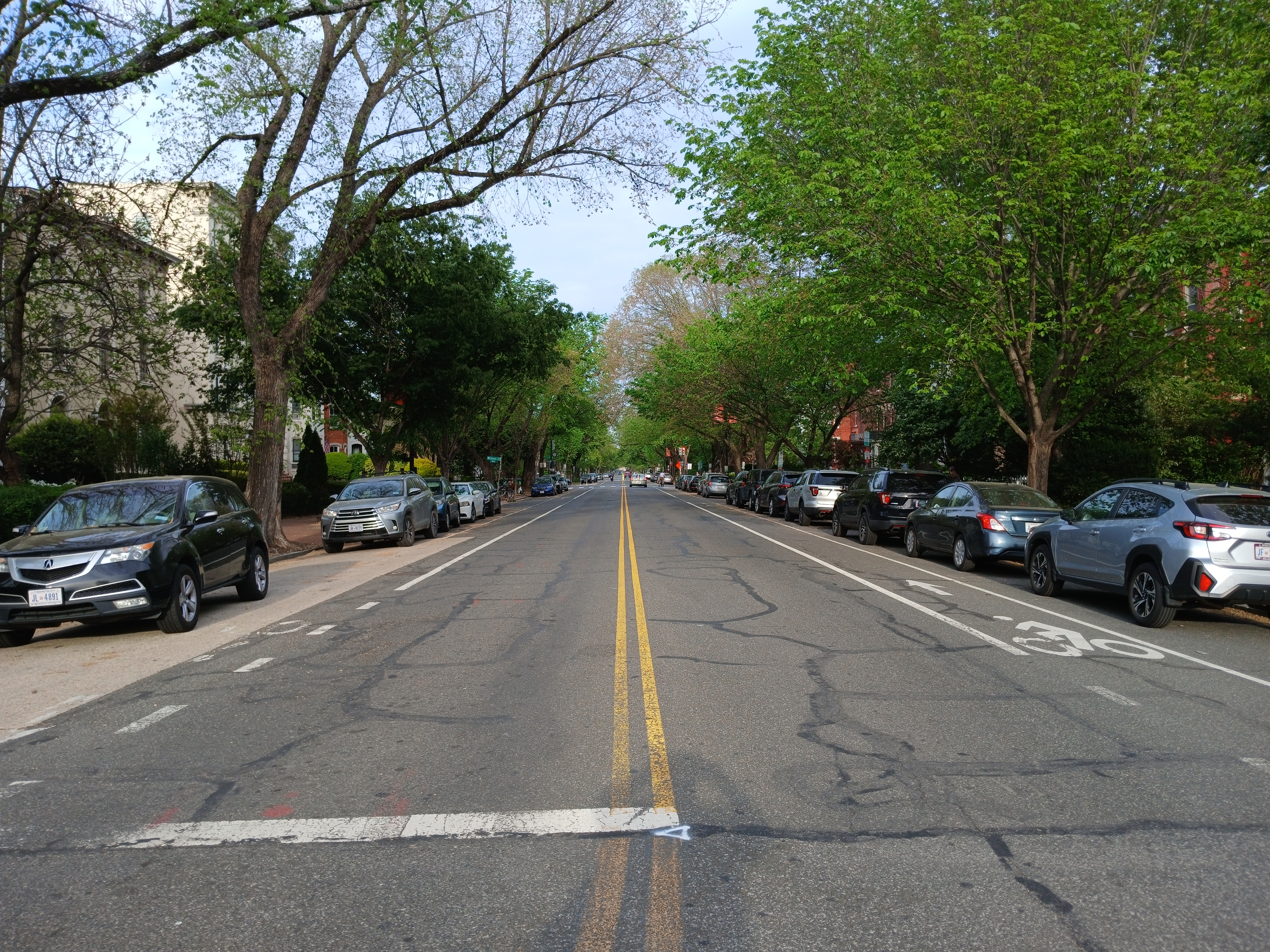
- East Capitol Street from the crosswalk of its intersection with 3rd Street, 2025
- Interactive map of East Capitol Street
- Maintained by: DDOT
- Location: Washington, D.C., U.S.
- Coordinates: 38°53′23.2″N 76°59′43.9″W
- West end: 1st Street
- Major junctions: Massachusetts Avenue; Independence Avenue / C Street; DC 295 (Anacostia Freeway); Benning Road
- East end: MD 214 / Southern Avenue

East Capitol Street is a major street that divides the northeast and southeast quadrants of Washington, D.C., United States. It runs due east from the United States Capitol to the DC-Maryland border. The street is uninterrupted until Lincoln Park then continues eastward around the former RFK Stadium. East of the stadium, East Capitol crosses the Anacostia River via the Whitney Young Memorial Bridge and then goes underneath Route 295 before crossing into Prince George's County, Maryland, where it becomes Maryland State Highway 214.

The western stretch of East Capitol Street passes through the Capitol Hill and Hill East neighborhoods. East Capitol Street is home to the Folger Shakespeare Library, US-Asia Institute, Les Aspin Center for Government, East Capitol Street Car Barn, D.C. Armory, and the future New Stadium at RFK Campus.
