= Selby-on-the-Bay, Maryland =

- Former census-designated place
- Coordinates: 38°54′27″N 76°31′10″W
- Country: United States
- State: Maryland
- County: Anne Arundel

Area
  - Total: 4.7 sq mi (12.2 km^{2})
  - Land: 3.2 sq mi (8.4 km^{2})
  - Water: 1.5 sq mi (3.8 km^{2})
- Elevation: 20 ft (6 m)

Population (2000)
  - Total: 3,674
  - Density: 1,100/sq mi (440/km^{2})
- Time zone: UTC−5 (Eastern (EST))
  - Summer (DST): UTC−4 (EDT)
- FIPS code: 24-71050
- GNIS feature ID: 1867300

Selby-on-the-Bay (often just called Selby) was a census-designated place (CDP) in Anne Arundel County, Maryland, United States, for the 2000 census, at which time its population was 3,674. It was added to the Mayo CDP for the 2010 census.

== Geography ==
Selby-on-the-Bay is located at 38°54′27″N 76°31′10″W (38.907513, −76.519476).

According to the United States Census Bureau, the CDP had a total area of 4.7 square miles (12 km^{2}), of which 3.2 square miles (8.3 km^{2}) is land and 1.5 square miles (3.9 km^{2}) (31.34%) is water.

== Demographics ==
As of the census of 2000, there were 3,674 people, 1,398 households, and 1,034 families residing in the CDP. The population density was 1,139.5 inhabitants per square mile (440.0/km^{2}). There were 1,480 housing units at an average density of 459.0 per square mile (177.2/km^{2}). The racial makeup of the CDP was 96.27% White, 1.22% African American, 0.16% Native American, 0.44% Asian, 0.27% from other races, and 1.63% from two or more races. Hispanic or Latino of any race were 1.22% of the population.

There were 1,398 households, out of which 34.9% had children under the age of 18 living with them, 61.7% were married couples living together, 8.8% had a female householder with no husband present, and 26.0% were non-families. 19.8% of all households were made up of individuals, and 6.6% had someone living alone who was 65 years of age or older. The average household size was 2.63 and the average family size was 3.02.

In the CDP, the population was spread out, with 25.3% under the age of 18, 6.0% from 18 to 24, 33.1% from 25 to 44, 24.9% from 45 to 64, and 10.8% who were 65 years of age or older. The median age was 38 years. For every 100 females, there were 101.0 males. For every 100 females age 18 and over, there were 100.0 males.

The median income for a household in the CDP was $69,477, and the median income for a family was $72,174. Males had a median income of $45,368 versus $35,114 for females. The per capita income for the CDP was $29,356. About 1.9% of families and 2.6% of the population were below the poverty line, including 1.0% of those under age 18 and 8.2% of those age 65 or over.
