= Camp Letts =

YMCA summer camp in Maryland, US

Coordinates: 38.889455°N 76.528466°W

YMCA Camp Letts is a 220-acre (0.89 km^{2}), co-educational summer residence camp and conference center located on the Rhode River, south of Annapolis, Maryland, that is run by the YMCA of Metropolitan Washington. The camp was founded in 1906.

== Current operations ==
The Camp mainly serves youngsters from the Baltimore-Washington area with a staff that is normally a mix of international and American counselors.
