= Queen Anne Bridge =

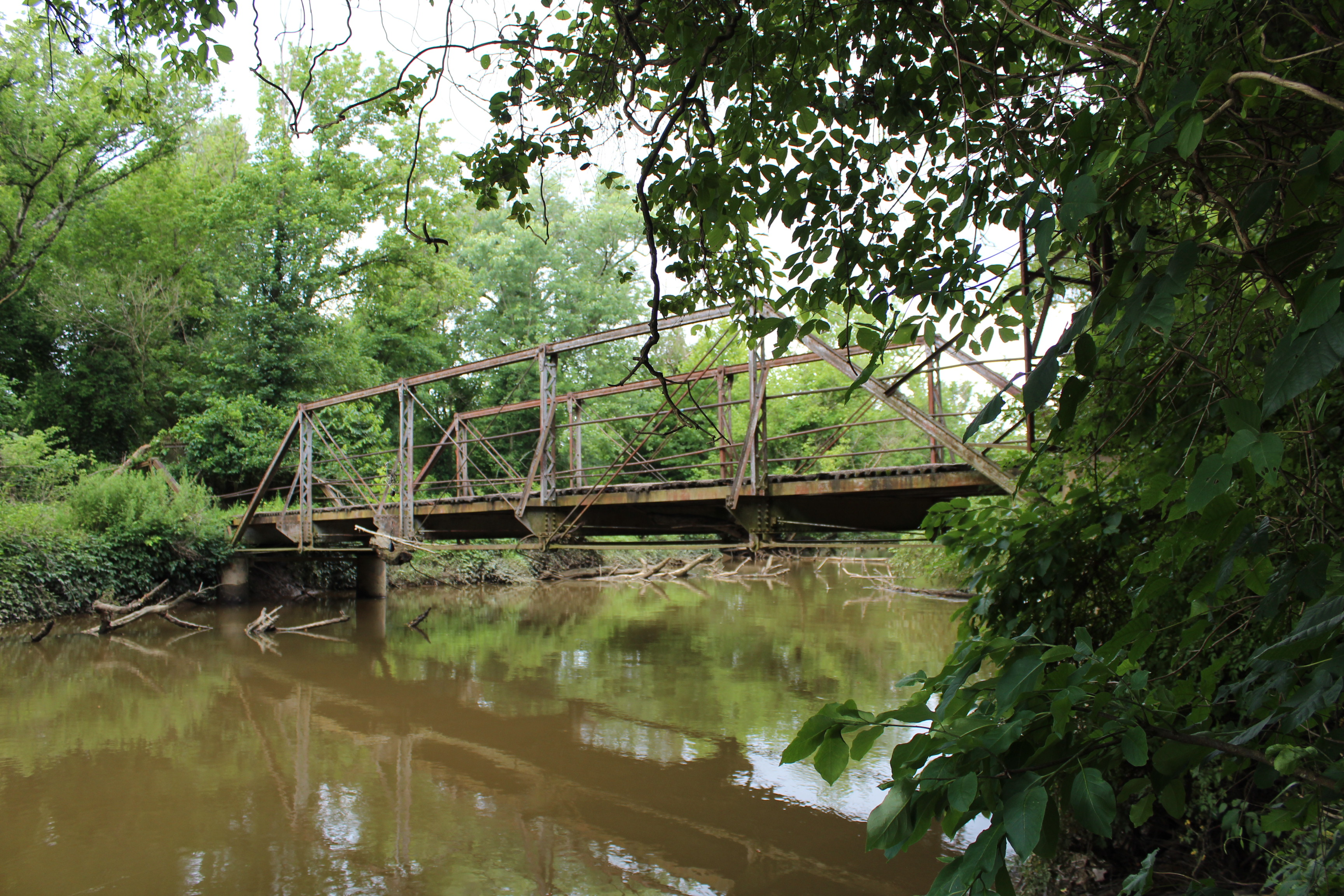
- Queen Anne Bridge
- Coordinates: 38°53′43″N 76°40′35″W
- Carried: Queen Anne Bridge Road
- Crossed: Patuxent River
- Owner: State Roads Commission
- Heritage status: Maryland Historical Trust

Characteristics
- Design: Pratt truss with Phoenix sections
- Material: Steel

History
- Constructed by: Dean & Westbrook
- Collapsed: partial, circa 1960

Queen Anne Bridge is an historic bridge over the Patuxent River near Queen Anne in Prince George's County, Maryland in the United States of America. It is the only surviving example of a Pratt truss bridge with Phoenix sections in the county.

Numerous bridges have been built on this site that once served as a main road connecting Anne Arundel County to Prince George's County. The first one was built in 1755 and by 1797 another wood bridge was built by local carpenter Colmor Duvall, only to be destroyed by a flood in June 1804. In 1804, the bridge was immediately rebuilt. The current structure was built about 1890 and was closed after the Anne Arundel span of the bridge collapsed due to an overloaded truck, circa 1960. It remained open for pedestrian use until 2007 and remains standing, though fenced now preventing it from even allowing pedestrian use between county park land on both sides of the river.
