= Hazelwood (Upper Marlboro, Maryland) =

Historic house in Maryland, United States

- U.S. National Register of Historic Places
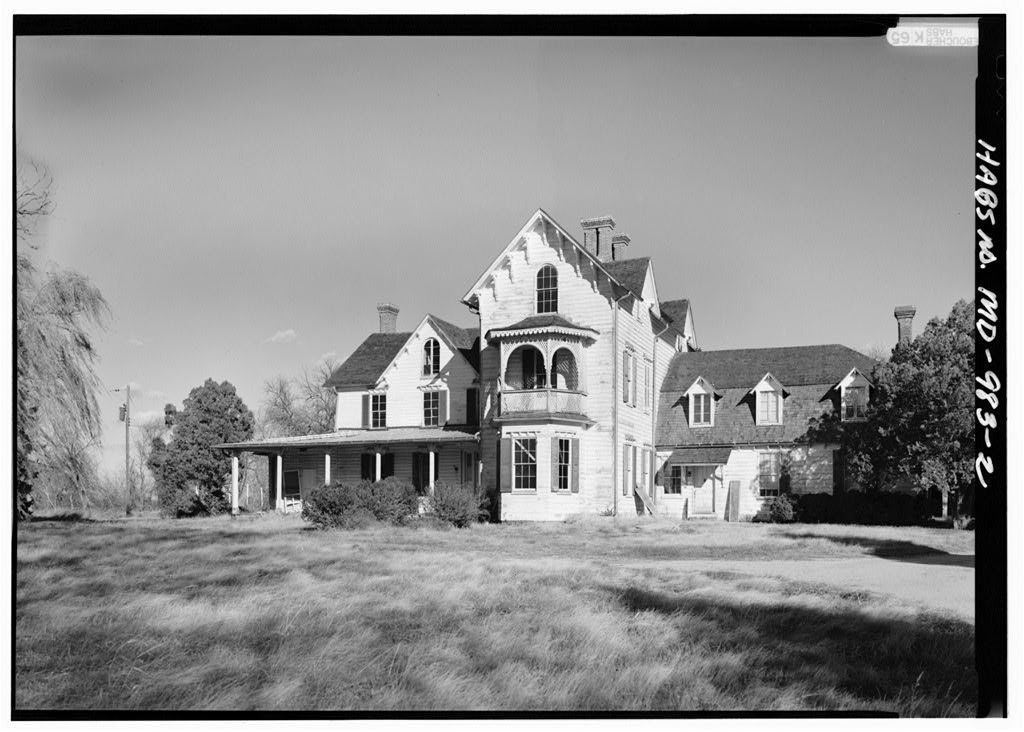
- Hazelwood, 1989 HABS Photo

- Location within Maryland Location within the United States
- Location: 18611 Queen Anne Rd., Upper Marlboro, Maryland
- Coordinates: 38°53′42″N 76°40′47″W
- Area: 20 acres (8.1 ha)
- Built: 1770-1860
- Architectural style: Colonial, Federal
- NRHP reference No.: 99000422
- Added to NRHP: April 1, 1999

Hazelwood is a historic home located outside Upper Marlboro, Prince George's County, Maryland, United States. The home is a large asymmetrical frame dwelling, built in three discrete sections over a long period of time. They are: a low gambrel-roofed section dating from the 18th century, about 1770; a gable-roofed Federal-style dwelling dating from the very early 19th century; and a tall gable-front Italianate-style central section constructed about 1860. The house stands on high ground west of and overlooking the site of historic Queen Anne town on the Patuxent River. Also on the property are several domestic and agricultural outbuildings, and the reputed sites of two cemeteries.

According to the Federal Direct Tax of 1798, the original section of the house (now the south section) was a 28-foot-square (8.5 m), framed dwelling with a hip roof. The original owner was Thomas Lancaster. Later, it was the home of his nephew's son, Major Thomas Lancaster Lansdale.

Hazelwood was listed on the National Register of Historic Places in 1999.
