= Beverley Beach, Maryland =

Unincorporated community in Maryland, United States

- Unincorporated community
- Location within the state of Maryland Beverley Beach (the United States)
- Coordinates: 38°52′31″N 76°30′29″W
- Country: United States
- State: Maryland
- County: Anne Arundel
- Time zone: UTC−5 (Eastern (EST))
  - Summer (DST): UTC−4 (EDT)
- GNIS feature ID: 583199

Beverley Beach is an unincorporated community in Anne Arundel County, Maryland, United States.

Beverley Beach is now a county park. In 2019 Maryland's Natural Resources Department mandated that the Beverley Beach Community Association open the beachfront to the public. Parking for the beach is only available at the main entrance at Beverly Triton Nature Park at 1202 Triton Beach Road Edgewater, MD 21037. Parking in the community to access the park is prohibited.

== History ==
Edgar Kalb, a successful Baltimore attorney, opened Beverly Beach in 1925. He, along with some family members, bought neighboring Ford Beach (renamed Triton Beach) in 1942. The land was platted for more than a hundred single-family homes, and the plat was named Beverley Beach. The origin of the name is unclear, but (with the additional 'e') is likely the surname of a relative or friend. The property is located in the community of Mayo, at the eastern terminus of Highway 214.

Kalb reserved the bayfront property for an exclusive day resort attraction, which was also named Beverley Beach, and for his own personal residence. The portion of the shore with a sandy bottom was developed for members of Beverley Beach, while the remainder of the shore (with a muck bottom) was the site of his personal residence, and was available for expansion of the day resort.

It is likely (but undocumented) that Kalb, with his wealth and connections, convinced Anne Arundel authorities to allow slot machines in the County. The approval came in 1943 and was a boon to Kalb's day resort. Kalb built three 'pavilions': two with a covered breezeway and one standalone just north of the others. The standalone was divided into two sections, with lockers and showers for patrons who waded into the sandy-bottom Chesapeake Bay. One of the other pavilions contained a growing number of slot machines and other coin-operated devices, while the southernmost pavilion had two refreshment stands (serving a limited menu of fast food, beer, and soft drinks), and a generous quantity of tables and chairs for dining. At the very north end, there was a dance floor and a bandstand, very popular with local young people on Fridays, Saturdays, and holiday eves.

In the late 1940s, the dance area was converted into a bingo hall, and the dining area was converted into more slots and other coin-operated devices. A swing set was added in the open area to the south.

The swimming area extended along some 300 feet (91 m)of beachfront, from the northern border of the subdivision to an area south of the Kalb residence, and in a roughly truncated semi-circle some 100–120 feet into the Chesapeake. About 2/3 of the distance from the shore were some 7-10 floats, which were square wood platforms supported by air-filled 55-gallon drums. One or two lifeguards were stationed on floats, each with a small wooden dinghy or small wooden scow for getting to and from shore, and for assisting swimmers who got themselves into trouble.

In late summer, the warm Chesapeake waters were plagued with sea nettles, small stinging jellyfish. Kalb combatted these with nettle nets which were erected around the swimming area (which was roughly a truncated semi-circle which extended perhaps 100–120 feet into the Chesapeake). The nettle nets were actually panels of wire mesh (with quarter-inch openings) installed between semi-permanent wood pilings in May and removed into storage each September. Each evening, a lifeguard would be tasked with hanging hurricane lanterns on some of the pilings, to warn boaters of the obstruction. Each morning, they would be taken down, refueled, wicks trimmed, and stored until evening. It was not considered to be an unpleasant duty, as the lifeguards took the opportunity to harvest soft-shelled crabs which were often found clinging to the nettle nets.

On weekends during its peak, Beverley Beach drew hundreds of cars and several busloads of people from the Washington and Baltimore areas. It was one of the few locations to which Russians were allowed to travel. The resort season extended from the first week in June to Labor Day. At that time, other times of the year were too cool or cold for swimming or sunbathing.

Segregation in Maryland was strong in the forties and early fifties, and although Beverley Beach employed many of Mayo's black community, they were not permitted in the resort except as employees. The resort avoided legal requirements by admitting only members, and memberships (which cost fifty cents) were issued at the entrance. In the fifties, a court order rejected the membership subterfuge and required that blacks be permitted to use the resort. Rather than accede to the court order, Kalb closed the resort in 1968.

In 1998 The Baltimore Sun reported,

[Kalb] kept a sign by the door that allowed only 'white gentiles' in, though many remember him also denying access to people of Mediterranean descent, Muslims, Hindus, Asians and Russians. It took a lawsuit in 1968 to bring the sign down. The county, some say, had turned a blind eye to Kalb's policies. The elder Kalb said he'd rather close the place than open it to blacks. And he did.
