= Joe Lansdale (footballer) =

English footballer

Personal information
- Full name: Joseph Lansdale
- Date of birth: 4 March 1894
- Place of birth: Little Lever, England
- Date of death: 1977 (aged 82–83)
- Position: Goalkeeper

Senior career*
Years	Team	Apps	(Gls)
–1912	Little Lever Congregational		
1912–1920	Norwich City		
1920–1930	Millwall	237	(0)
1930–1931	Accrington Stanley	26	(0)
- Folkestone
- * Club domestic league appearances and goals

Joseph Lansdale (4 March 1894 – 1977) was an English professional footballer who played as a goalkeeper in the Football League for Millwall. In 1926, he set a Football League record with 10 consecutive clean sheets.

== Personal life ==
Lansdale served as a gunner in the Royal Garrison Artillery during the First World War.

== Career statistics ==
Appearances and goals by club, season and competition
Club	Season	League			FA Cup		Total	
Club	Season	Division	Apps	Goals	Apps	Goals	Apps	Goals
Millwall	1920–21	Third Division	40	0	1	0	41	0
Millwall	1921–22	Third Division South	40	0	5	0	45	0
Millwall	1922–23	Third Division South	29	0	3	0	32	0
Millwall	1923–24	Third Division South	9	0	0	0	9	0
Millwall	1924–25	Third Division South	10	0	1	0	11	0
Millwall	1925–26	Third Division South	19	0	5	0	24	0
Millwall	1926–27	Third Division South	37	0	5	0	42	0
Millwall	1927–28	Third Division South	8	0	0	0	8	0
Millwall	1928–29	Second Division	19	0	4	0	23	0
Millwall	1929–30	Second Division	25	0	3	0	28	0
Career total			237	0	27	0	264	0
