= West River (Maryland) =

River in Maryland, United States

Coordinates: 38°51′23″N 76°31′45″W

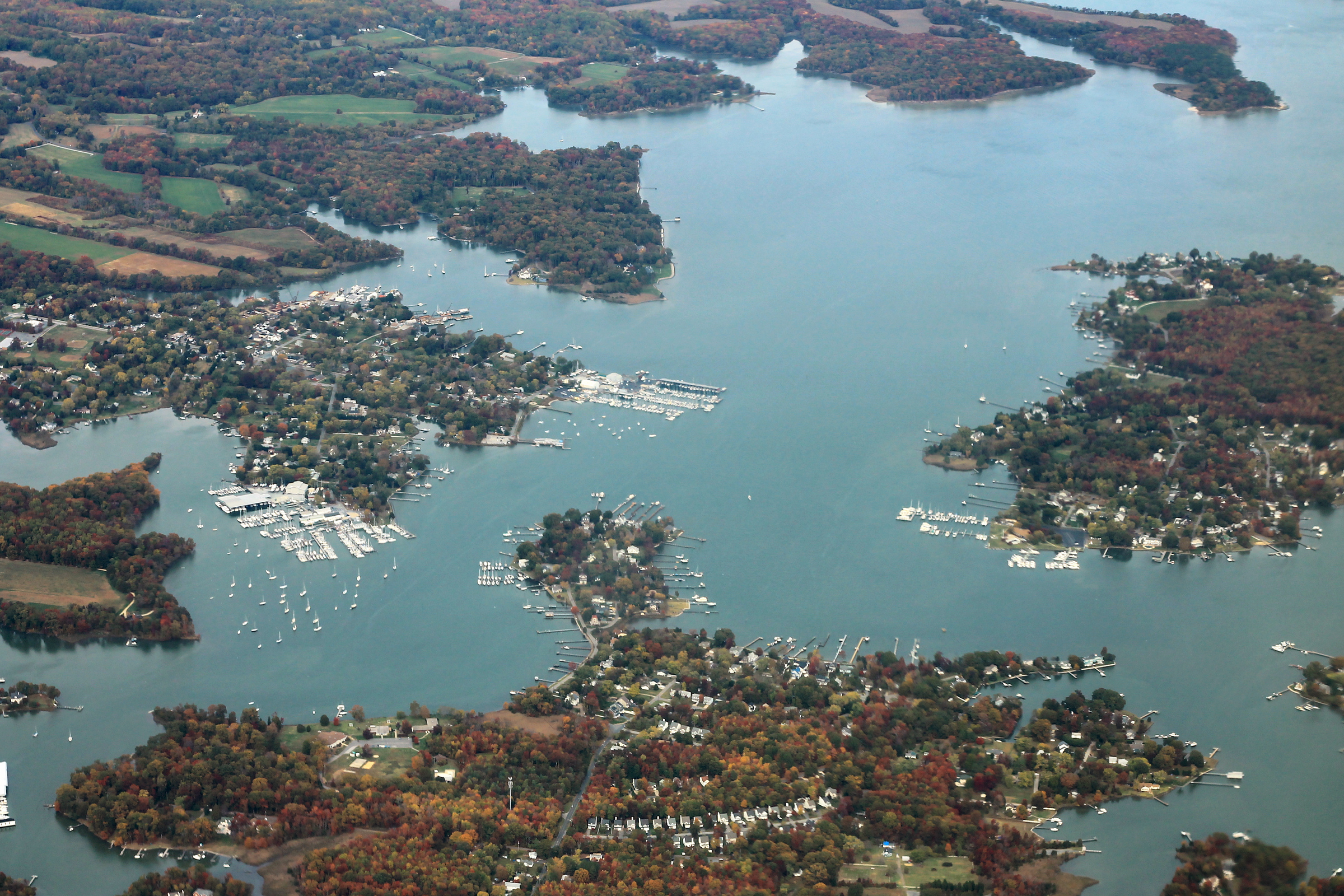
Aerial view of the West River

The West River is a 6-mile-long (9.7 km) tidal tributary of the Chesapeake Bay in southern Anne Arundel County, Maryland, United States. It is south of the Rhode River, which is one of its tributaries, and north of Herring Bay.

These are its named tidal creeks and rivers starting at the southern edge of its mouth and going clockwise:

- Parish Creek
- Lafayette Creek (unofficial name)
- South Creek
- Upper West River/Fords Creek (latter is an unofficial name)
- Johns Creek
- Smith Creek
- Lerch Creek
- Tenthouse Creek & Cox Creek (Cox is a tributary of Tenthouse)
- Popham Creek
- Scaffold Creek
- Cheston Creek
- Rhode River

== See also ==
- List of Maryland rivers
