= Queen Anne, Prince George's County, Maryland =

Queen Anne
- Census-designated place
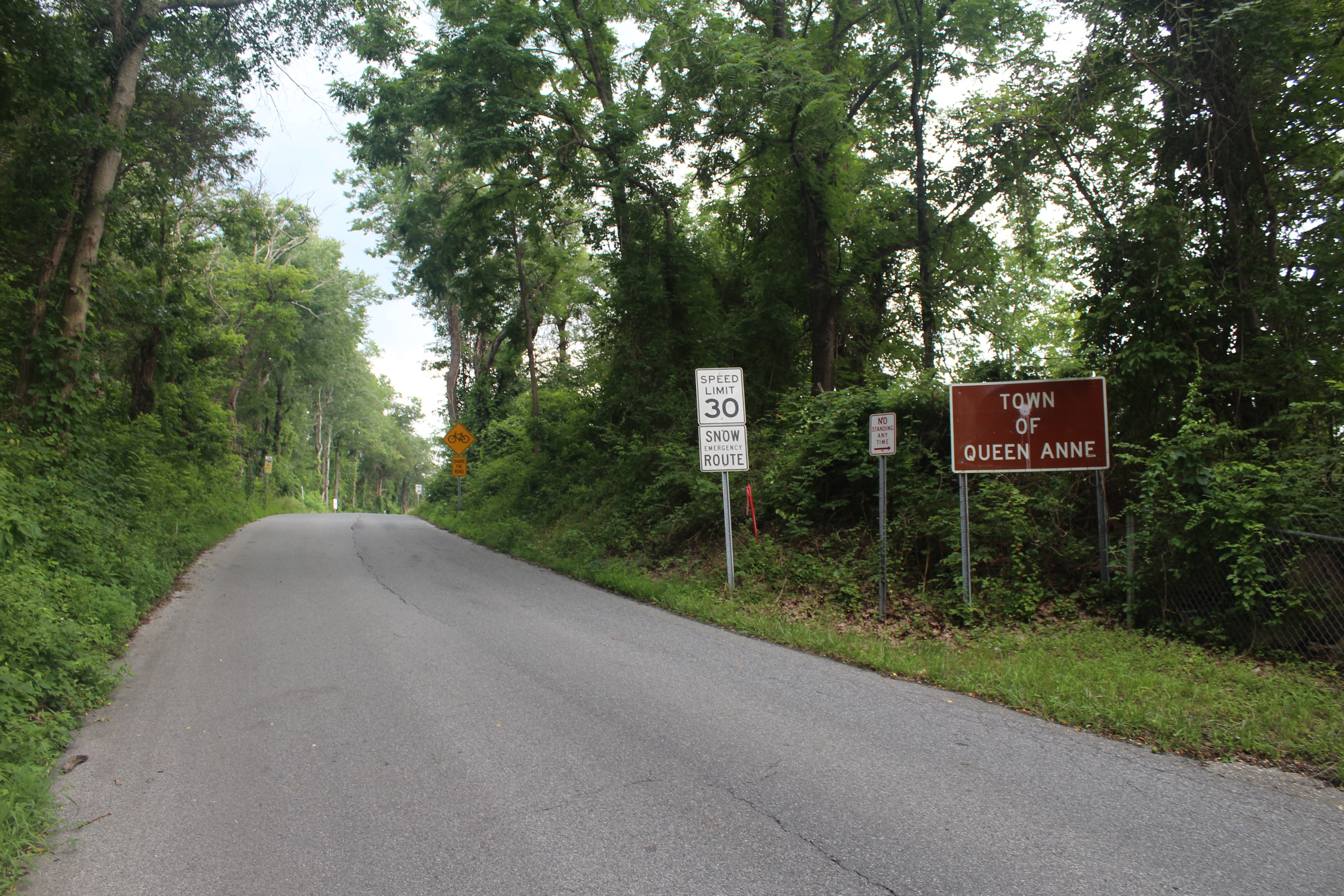

- Location within the state of Maryland Queen Anne (the United States)
- Coordinates: 38°53′55″N 76°40′42″W
- Country: United States
- State: Maryland
- County: Prince George's

Area
  - Total: 8.74 sq mi (22.63 km^{2})
  - Land: 8.71 sq mi (22.57 km^{2})
  - Water: 0.023 sq mi (0.06 km^{2})
- Elevation: 50 ft (15 m)

Population (2020)
  - Total: 1,405
  - Density: 161.2/sq mi (62.25/km^{2})
- Time zone: UTC−5 (Eastern (EST))
  - Summer (DST): UTC−4 (EDT)
- Area codes: 301, 240
- FIPS code: 24-64495

Queen Anne in Prince George's County, Maryland, United States, is a former port on the Patuxent River. It was delineated as a CDP for the 2010 census, at which time it had a population of 1,280. Per the 2020 census, the population was 1,405.

== Geography ==
Queen Anne is located at 38°53'55" North, 76°40'42" West (38.8987239 -76.6782992). Most of the town's former waterfront area is now part of Patuxent River Park, owned and operated by the Maryland-National Capital Park and Planning Commission. This includes hiking trails, two paddling launches, fishing locations, and an environmental education center operated by 4H. The head of tidewater on the Patuxent River is at the downstream (4H---a group not affiliated with the National 4H Club) launch site in Queen Anne.

According to the U.S. Census Bureau, Queen Anne has a total area of 8.7 square miles (22.6 km^{2}), of which 0.02 square miles (0.06 km^{2}), or 0.25%, is water.

== History ==
The town was created in 1706 when the colonial Maryland Legislature authorized surveying and laying out the towns of Queen Anne Town, Nottingham, Mill Town, Piscataway, Aire (also known as Broad Creek) and Upper Marlboro (then known as Marlborough Town).

Queen Anne's Town was created as part of a 1706 act "for the advancement of trade and erecting ports and towns in the Province of Maryland." The town grew to a population of about 150.

In 1747, the legislature tried to improve the quality and the method of marketing tobacco, then the major crop of the area, and established a formal system of tobacco inspection and quality control. A tobacco inspection station and warehouse was located on Hazelwood, then owned by Thomas Lancaster, one of the town's leading merchants. Hazelwood Mansion, though in disrepair, stands today and is owned by the Maryland National Park and Planning Commission). This was one of seven state tobacco warehouses built in Prince George's County. A horse racing track was also built in the town.

By the mid-18th century, upland farming in the Patuxent basin without erosion control led to massive silting of the river. The ports along the Patuxent quickly filled with silt and could no longer take in ocean-going vessels such as the snows that frequented the town. The last cargo ship left for England about 1790, and the town began to decline.

During the War of 1812, the Chesapeake Bay Flotilla commanded by Joshua Barney scuttled his entire fleet in the half dozen miles of river below Queen Anne to avoid the vessels being captured by the advancing British.

The community is also known for being the original site of the Greater Mt. Nebo AME Church, the Mt. Nebo school for African Americans, and the Greater Mt. Nebo cemetery, now managed by Maryland National Capitol Park and Planning. The original church building remains, but the congregation built adjacent to it a modern building which was sold; th congregation has relocated to a site on Route 301 South above 214, a few miles away. The old school was sold and torn down to build a new home. Only the cemetery remains, in need of continued preservation and repair. The church and cemetery are significant repositories of African American Cultural Heritage.

== Demographics ==
Historical population
Census	Pop.	Note	%±
2010	1,280		—
2020	1,405		9.8%
U.S. Decennial Census; 2010 2020

Queen Anne first appeared as a census designated place in the 2010 U.S. census.

=== Racial and ethnic composition ===
Queen Anne CDP, Maryland – Racial and ethnic composition Note: the US Census treats Hispanic/Latino as an ethnic category. This table excludes Latinos from the racial categories and assigns them to a separate category. Hispanics/Latinos may be of any race.
Race / Ethnicity (NH = Non-Hispanic)	Pop 2010	Pop 2020	% 2010	% 2020
White alone (NH)	540	492	42.19%	35.02%
Black or African American alone (NH)	634	685	49.53%	48.75%
Native American or Alaska Native alone (NH)	4	2	0.31%	0.14%
Asian alone (NH)	16	48	1.25%	3.42%
Native Hawaiian or Pacific Islander alone (NH)	2	1	0.16%	0.07%
Other race alone (NH)	5	6	0.39%	0.43%
Mixed race or Multiracial (NH)	30	53	2.34%	3.77%
Hispanic or Latino (any race)	49	118	3.83%	8.40%
Total	1,280	1,405	100.00%	100.00%

== Queen Anne Bridge ==
Queen Anne Bridge, originally built in 1755, once served as a main road connecting Anne Arundel County to Prince George's County.

== Renaming ==
In 1897 the United States Board on Geographic Names decided to change the name of Queen Anne to Hardesty to avoid confusion with the other town in Maryland named Queen Anne. However, local usage including signage, road names, bridge names, commercial mapping, the community association name, etc. continues to reflect the Queen Anne name. For the 2010 census, the U.S. Census Bureau used the original name of "Queen Anne" in delineating a new census-designated place covering the community.

== Education ==
Prince George's County Public Schools operates public schools serving the census-designated place.

Schools serving sections of the CDP are Pointer Ridge Elementary School, Benjamin Tasker Middle School, and Bowie High School. Fairhaven, a private school in the Lincoln-Sudbury curriculum, is located on Queen Anne Road serving elementary, middle, and high school age children. Neighborhood children have also attended Riverdale, the former Queen Anne Episcopal School, St. Mary's of Annapolis, and Sidwell Friends. Queen Anne is a 5 minutes drive from the South Bowie Library.
