= Largo, Maryland =

- Census-designated place
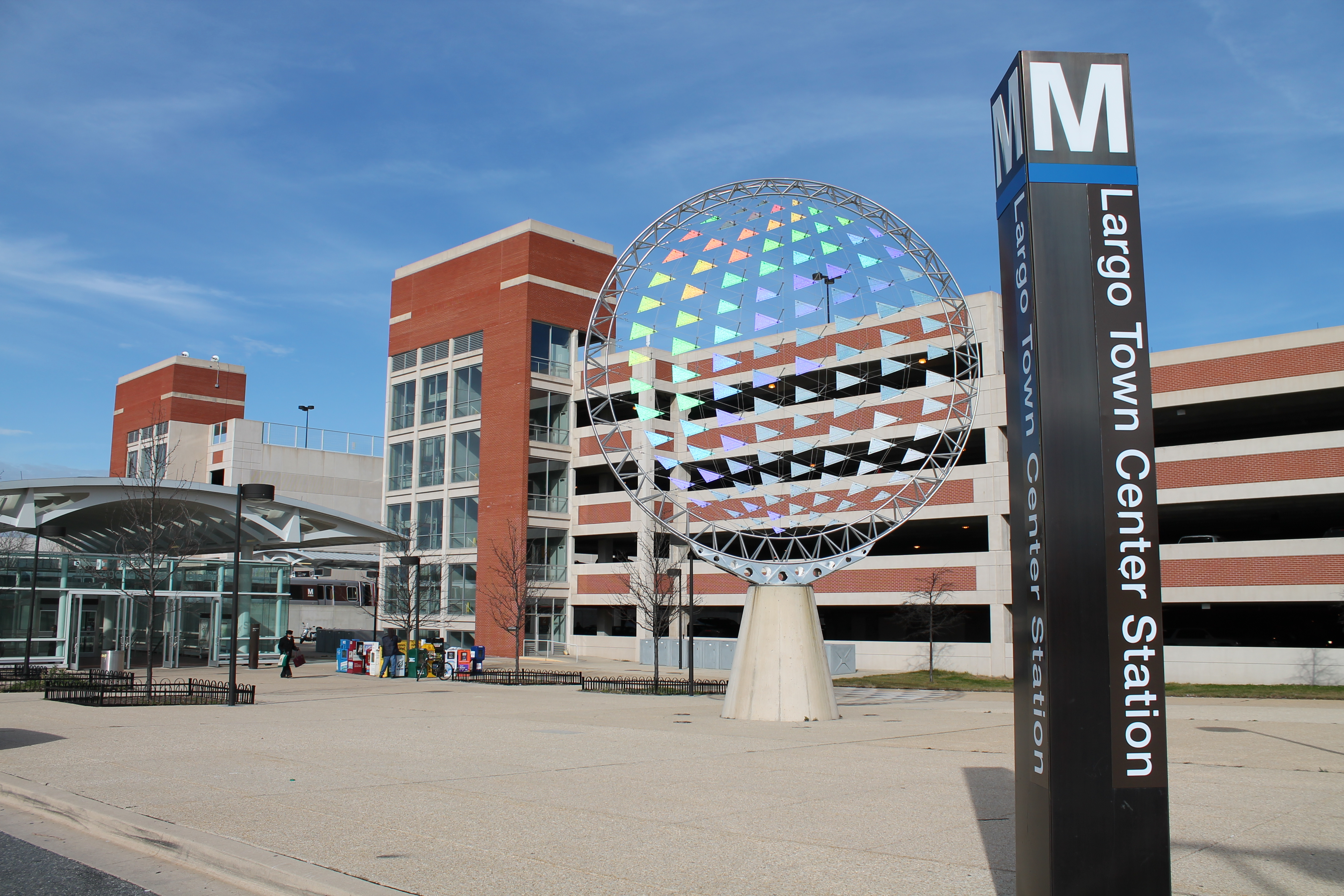
- Downtown Largo station in Downtown Largo

- Location of Largo, Maryland
- Coordinates: 38°52′37″N 76°49′50″W
- Country: United States
- State: Maryland
- County: Prince George's
- Named for: Largo Bay, Scotland

Area
  - Total: 3.06 sq mi (7.93 km^{2})
  - Land: 3.06 sq mi (7.93 km^{2})
  - Water: 0 sq mi (0.00 km^{2})
- Elevation: 174 ft (53 m)

Population (2020)
  - Total: 11,605
  - Density: 3,790.3/sq mi (1,463.43/km^{2})
- Time zone: UTC−5 (Eastern (EST))
  - Summer (DST): UTC−4 (EDT)
- ZIP code: 20774
- Area codes: 301, 240
- FIPS code: 24-45825
- GNIS feature ID: 0597664

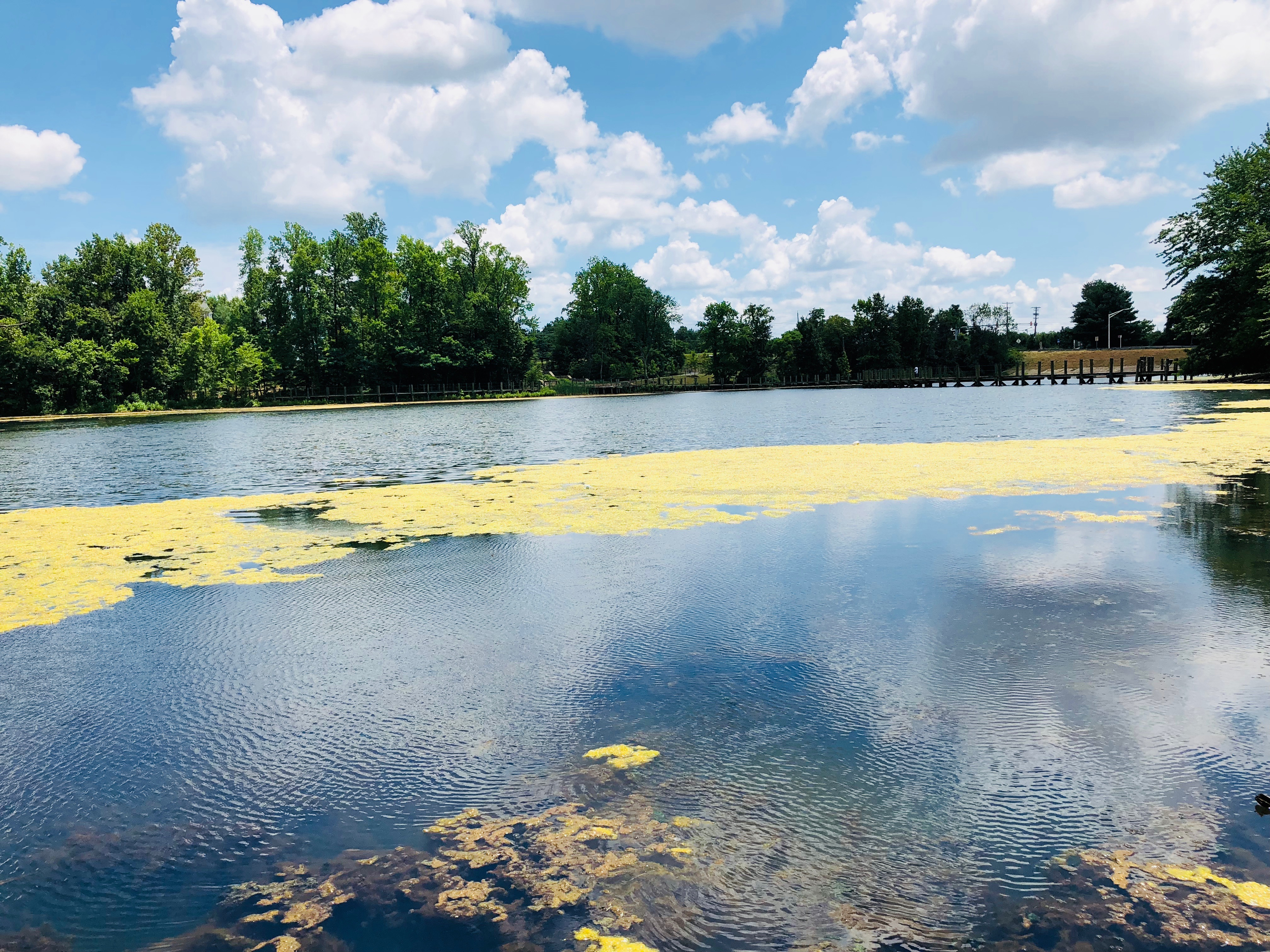
Lake Largo is located in Upper Marlboro's neighborhood of Largo.

Largo (/lɑːrɡoʊ/) is an unincorporated area and census-designated place in Prince George's County, Maryland, United States. The population was 11,605 at the 2020 census.

Largo is located just east of the Capital Beltway (I-95/495) and is home to Prince George's Community College and Largo High School. Six Flags America amusement park (formerly known as Wild World and Adventure World) is to the east in Woodmore, and FedExField, the Washington Commanders's stadium, is across the Capital Beltway in Summerfield. Watkins Regional Park in Kettering just to the east of Largo (operated by the Maryland-National Capital Park and Planning Commission) has an old-fashioned carousel, miniature train ride, miniature golf, the Old Maryland Farm, a playground, and animals on display. Largo is not a post office designation, but is at the northern end of the Greater Upper Marlboro ZIP code area.

== History ==
Largo was named after the Largo Plantation that was owned by the Beall family. The plantation is believed to be named after Largo Bay in Scotland. It was sold to John Contee in 1745.

Arelis R. Hernández of The Washington Post stated in 2015 that "There has been talk for decades of relocating the [Prince George's County] government to Largo". In 2015 Rushern Baker, the county executive, expressed a desire to move the county seat from Upper Marlboro to Largo since the latter has a more central location and access to the Washington Metro network. A spokesperson for Mike Miller, the President of the Maryland Senate, expressed opposition to this idea.

== Geography ==
According to the United States Census Bureau, the CDP has a total area of 3.0 square miles (7.8 km^{2}), all land.

== Demographics ==
Historical population
Census	Pop.	Note	%±
1980	5,557		—
1990	9,475		70.5%
2000	8,408		−11.3%
2010	10,709		27.4%
2020	11,605		8.4%
U.S. Decennial Census; 2010 2020

=== Racial and ethnic composition ===
Largo CDP, Maryland – Racial and ethnic composition Note: the US Census treats Hispanic/Latino as an ethnic category. This table excludes Latinos from the racial categories and assigns them to a separate category. Hispanics/Latinos may be of any race.
Race / Ethnicity (NH = Non-Hispanic)	Pop 2000	Pop 2010	Pop 2020	% 2000	% 2010	% 2020
White alone (NH)	345	309	232	4.10%	2.89%	2.00%
Black or African American alone (NH)	7,734	9,691	10,134	91.98%	90.49%	87.32%
Native American or Alaska Native alone (NH)	11	31	25	0.13%	0.29%	0.22%
Asian alone (NH)	65	194	189	0.77%	1.81%	1.63%
Native Hawaiian or Pacific Islander alone (NH)	3	0	1	0.04%	0.00%	0.01%
Other race alone (NH)	13	15	68	0.15%	0.14%	0.59%
Mixed race or Multiracial (NH)	117	192	421	1.39%	1.79%	3.63%
Hispanic or Latino (any race)	120	277	535	1.43%	2.59%	4.61%
Total	8,408	10,709	11,605	100.00%	100.00%	100.00%

=== 2020 census ===
As of the 2020 census, Largo had a population of 11,605. The median age was 40.1 years. 18.9% of residents were under the age of 18 and 15.5% of residents were 65 years of age or older. For every 100 females, there were 80.1 males, and for every 100 females age 18 and over, there were 75.6 males.

100.0% of residents lived in urban areas, while 0.0% lived in rural areas.

There were 4,702 households in Largo, of which 26.0% had children under the age of 18 living in them. Of all households, 31.1% were married-couple households, 18.5% were households with a male householder and no spouse or partner present, and 44.9% were households with a female householder and no spouse or partner present. About 33.4% of all households were made up of individuals, and 9.4% had someone living alone who was 65 years of age or older.

There were 4,930 housing units, of which 4.6% were vacant. The homeowner vacancy rate was 0.6% and the rental vacancy rate was 7.0%.

=== 2000 census ===
As of the census of 2000, there were 8,408 people, 3,471 households, and 2,127 families residing in the CDP. The population density was 2,758.8 inhabitants per square mile (1,065.2/km^{2}). There were 3,709 housing units at an average density of 1,217.0 per square mile (469.9/km^{2}). The racial makeup of the CDP was 4.27% White, 92.69% African American, 0.13% Native American, 0.78% Asian, 0.04% Pacific Islander, 0.51% from other races, and 1.58% from two or more races. Hispanic or Latino of any race were 1.43% of the population.

There were 3,471 households, out of which 31.7% had children under the age of 18 living with them, 34.3% were married couples living together, 22.4% had a female householder with no husband present, and 38.7% were non-families. Of all households 31.9% were made up of individuals, and 3.3% had someone living alone who was 65 years of age or older. The average household size was 2.41 and the average family size was 3.09.

In the CDP, the population was spread out, with 25.3% under the age of 18, 8.4% from 18 to 24, 35.9% from 25 to 44, 25.7% from 45 to 64, and 4.7% who were 65 years of age or older. The median age was 34 years. For every 100 females, there were 79.4 males. For every 100 females age 18 and over, there were 73.7 males.

The median income for a household in the CDP was $58,130, and the median income for a family was $70,421. Males had a median income of $40,067 versus $37,417 for females. The per capita income for the CDP was $26,312. About 3.2% of families and 5.3% of the population were below the poverty line, including 7.6% of those under age 18 and 6.5% of those age 65 or over.

== Arts and culture ==
Largo is served by the Largo-Kettering Branch of the Prince George's County Memorial Library System (PGCMLS) and is the headquarters location for PGCMLS. The library headquarters, previously adjacent to the Hyattsville Branch, moved to Largo in 2015.

== Education ==
=== Primary and secondary schools ===
Largo is a part of the Prince George's County Public Schools. Residents are divided between Arrowhead, Kettering, and Lake Arbor elementary schools. Most areas are zoned to Kettering Middle School while some are zoned to Ernest Everett Just Middle School. All areas in Largo are zoned to Largo High School.

Divine Peace Lutheran School is a K-8 Christian school of the Wisconsin Evangelical Lutheran Synod in Largo.

=== Post-secondary education ===
The community is also home to Prince George's Community College, serving a county population of 850,000 residents.

== Infrastructure ==
Since the transit system's expansion in late 2004, Downtown Largo station has served as the eastern end of the Blue and Silver Lines of the Washington Metro. The station is served by several regional bus routes operated by both WMATA and Prince George's County's The Bus.

Even though the county seat is in Upper Marlboro, multiple agencies of the Government of Prince George's County, including the majority of the county's executive branch, reside in Largo. In the 1990s the PG County government purchased some properties and leased others, and county administrative functions were moved to Largo. Circa 2010, five PG County agencies were headquartered in these properties in Largo. Beginning in 2011, four additional county agencies relocated to Largo, and the county government acquired at least eight parcels of land and/or buildings. As of 2015 County Executive Baker held his "Citizen Day" in Largo instead of Upper Marlboro.

Prince George's County Police Department District 2 Station in Brock Hall CDP, with a Bowie postal address, serves the community.

The U.S. Postal Service operates the Largo Post Office in Lake Arbor CDP, with a Largo postal address.

== Notable people ==
- Wale Folarin, rapper
- Oddisee, rapper
- Q Da Fool, rapper
- Rico Nasty, rapper
- redveil, rapper
- Tramell Tillman, actor
- Albert Wynn, former Congressman.
- Usama Young, Former American football safety
