= Henry Todd =

Henry Todd may refer to:

- Henry Alfred Todd (1854–1925), American Romance philologist
- Henry Todd (priest) (1763–1845), English clergyman, librarian, and scholar
- Henry D. Todd (1838–1907), U.S. Naval Academy professor
- Henry D. Todd Jr. (1866–1964), U.S. Army general
- Henry George Todd (1847–1898), English artist
- Henry Todd (mountaineer) (1945–2025), Scottish climbing expedition organiser, mountaineer and drug dealer
