= Henry D. Todd =

United States Navy rear admiral

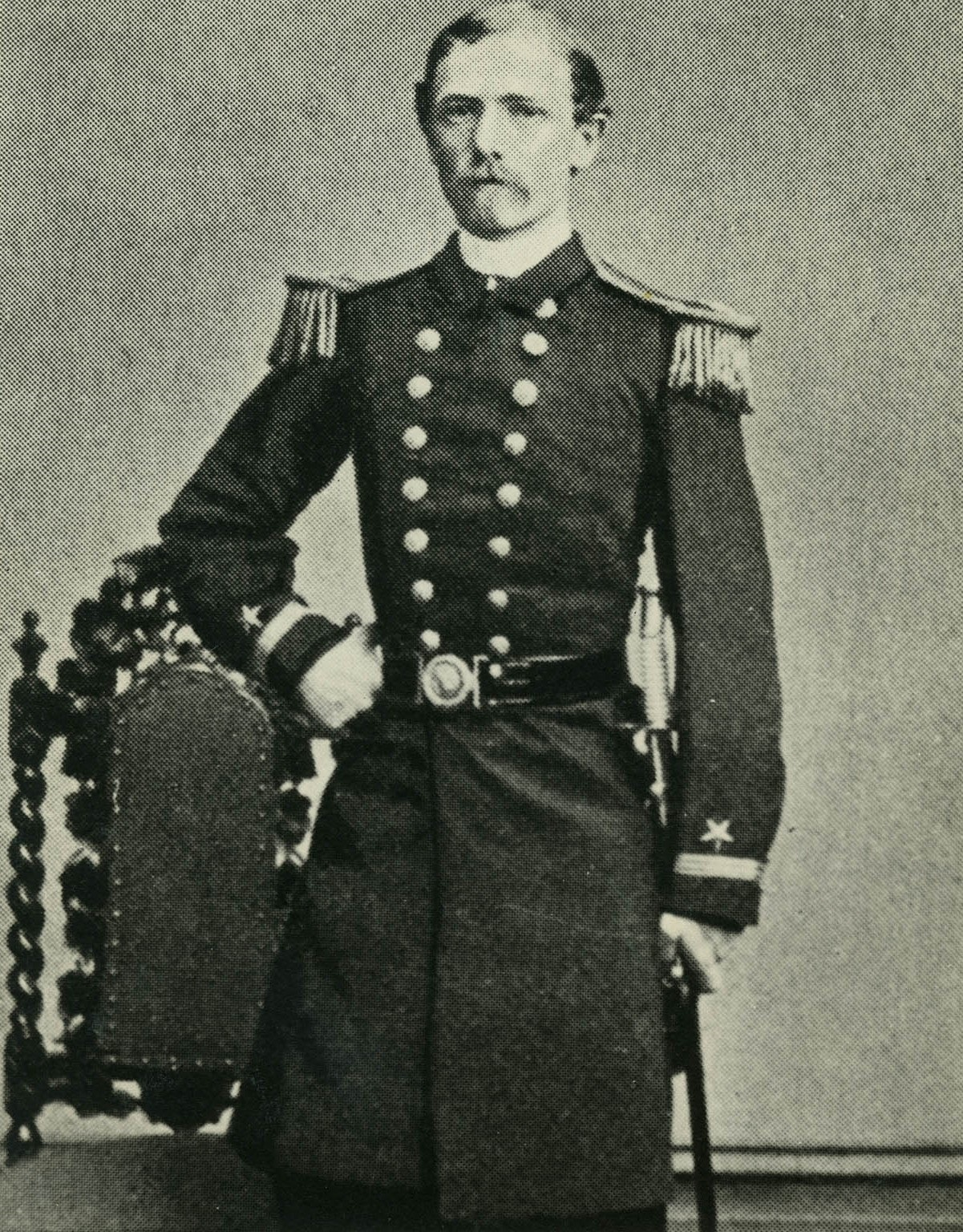
- Henry D. Todd circa 1862
- Born: August 25, 1838; Cambridge, Massachusetts
- Died: March 8, 1907 (aged 68); Annapolis, Maryland
- Burial place: United States Naval Academy Cemetery
- Spouse: Flora Johnson (m. 1865-1907, his death)
- Children: 2 (including Henry D. Todd Jr.)
- Relatives: John Johnson Jr. (father in law)
- Military career
- Allegiance: United States
- Branch: Union Navy; United States Navy
- Service years: 1857-1861 (U.S. Navy); 1861-1866 (Union Navy); 1877-1900 (U.S. Navy)
- Rank: Professor (relative rank of Rear Admiral)
- Units: USS Mohican; USS Cumberland; USS Sacramento; United States Naval Academy
- Commands: Physics and Chemistry Department, U.S. Naval Academy; Director of Publication, American Ephemeris and Nautical Almanac
- Conflicts: American Civil War

Henry D. Todd (August 25, 1838 - March 8, 1907) was a career officer in the United States Navy. A Union Navy veteran of the American Civil War and a longtime professor at the United States Naval Academy, he attained the relative rank of rear admiral. (Note: "Relative rank" was a personnel management process used by the U.S. Navy to award officers in certain specialty fields rank comparable to line officers at similar levels of responsibility. It applied to Naval Academy professors, surgeons, pay officers, engineers, and chaplains.) In addition to serving as head of the Naval Academy's physics and chemistry department, for many years he oversaw publication of the Navy's annual American Ephemeris and Nautical Almanac, first as assistant director and later as director.

== Early life ==
Henry Davis Todd was born in Cambridge, Massachusetts on August 25, 1838, the son of John Neatby Todd, a ship's purser in the United States Navy and Julia (Parsons) Todd. He was educated in the schools of Nyack, New York and began attendance at the United States Naval Academy as an acting midshipman in 1853. He graduated in 1857 and began duties as a midshipman.

== Early career ==
Todd was a career Navy officer. He was appointed a passed midshipman in June 1860, master in October 1860, lieutenant in April 1861, and lieutenant commander in January 1863. In August 1860, he was serving aboard USS Mohican as part of the Africa Squadron when Mohican captured the slave ship Erie, commanded by Nathaniel Gordon. Todd took command of Erie as a prize of war and sailed for Monrovia, Liberia, where he turned nearly 900 captured Africans, most of them children, over to a Liberian government agent so they could be returned to their homes. Todd provided evidence at Gordon's 1862 trial and Gordon was convicted of violating the Piracy Law of 1820. He was hanged in February 1862, and was the only person ever convicted of violating the piracy law.

At the beginning of the American Civil War, Todd served aboard USS Cumberland, which took part in destroying the Norfolk Naval Shipyard to prevent its use by the Confederate States Navy. He took part in numerous engagements in Virginia, and was wounded during an 1862 battle on the Appomattox River. During 1862 and 1863, Todd served as flag lieutenant to Admiral Charles Wilkes. From 1863 until the end of the war, he served aboard USS Sacramento.

== Continued career ==
In 1865 and 1866, Todd was a mathematics instructor at the Naval Academy. Between 1867 and 1877, Todd taught first in Brookline, Massachusetts, and later in Philadelphia. In 1877 he returned to the Naval Academy faculty, and he remained a member until his retirement. Beginning with the relative rank of lieutenant as an assistant professor, Todd later held the relative rank of commander as a full professor and head of a faculty department, and captain as assistant director of publication for the Nautical Almanac. When he was appointed director, Todd received promotion to the relative rank of rear admiral.

From 1879 to 1886, Todd was head of the physics and chemistry department at the Naval Academy. In 1886, he became assistant director of publication for the Navy's annual American Ephemeris and Nautical Almanac. In 1899, he became director, and he remained in this post until 1900. Having reached the mandatory retirement age of 62, Todd left the Navy in August 1900.

== Retirement and death ==
In retirement, Todd was a resident of Annapolis, Maryland. He died at his home in Annapolis on March 8, 1907. Todd was buried at the United States Naval Academy Cemetery.

== Family ==
In 1865, Todd married Flora Johnson (1845-1933), the daughter of John Johnson Jr., a prominent Maryland attorney and judge. Her grandfather was John Johnson Sr. and Reverdy Johnson was her uncle.

The Todds were the parents of Mary Johnson Todd and Henry D. Todd Jr. Henry Davis Todd Jr. was a career officer in the United States Army and attained the rank of major general.
