= Theodorick Bland (judge) =

American judge

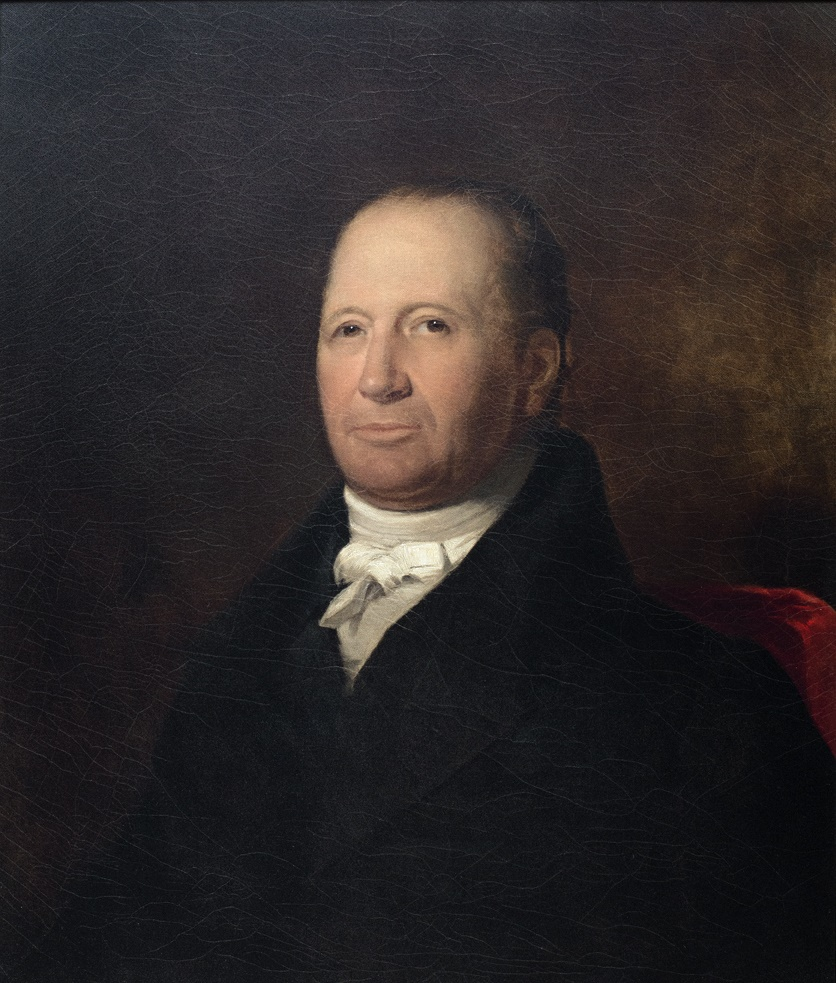
- Chancellor Theodorick Bland (1776–1846) by John Wesley Jarvis

Chancellor of Maryland
- In office August 16, 1824 – November 16, 1846
- Appointed by: Samuel Stevens Jr.
- Preceded by: John Johnson Sr.
- Succeeded by: John Johnson Jr.

Judge of the United States District Court for the District of Maryland
- In office November 23, 1819 – August 16, 1824
- Appointed by: James Monroe
- Preceded by: James Houston
- Succeeded by: Elias Glenn

Personal details
- Born: Theodorick Bland; December 6, 1776 Dinwiddie County, Colony of Virginia, British America
- Died: November 16, 1846 (aged 69) Annapolis, Maryland, U.S.

Theodorick Bland (December 6, 1776 – November 16, 1846) was an American attorney and statesman who was Chancellor of Maryland from 1824 to 1846 and a United States district judge of the United States District Court for the District of Maryland.

== Education and early career ==
Born in Dinwiddie County, Virginia, Bland was admitted to the bar in 1797. He was in private practice of law in Danville Virginia, then in Tennessee and Kentucky, and finally in Baltimore, Maryland. Around 1800, he settled in Baltimore after reportedly after "becoming dissatisfied with life on the frontier". He was elected a member of the Maryland House of Delegates in 1809 where he helped to write a new criminal code for the state. He was secretary of the Committee of Public Safety for Baltimore, beginning in 1812. On October 10, 1812, Bland was appointed to succeed Thomas Jones an associate judge for the 6th Judicial District of Maryland, which included Baltimore and Harford Counties, and served in that capacity until 1817. During the War of 1812, he was Secretary of the city's Committee of Safety, and was active in defense of the city at the time of British invasion.

== South American Commission service ==
Along with Caesar Augustus Rodney and John Graham, Bland was selected by President James Monroe in November 1817 for a special diplomatic mission to South America, the South American Commission of 1817–1818. He was endorsed for the slot by the secretary to the commission, Henry Marie Brackenridge. Bland suggested to Monroe that at least part of the Commission be authorized to visit Chile and authorization for this was given by United States Secretary of State John Quincy Adams two-weeks before setting sail. Under the command of Commodore Arthur Sinclair, the USS Congress sailed on December 4, 1817, and arrived at Rio de Janeiro on January 29, 1818. In Montevideo, Bland introduced botanist William Baldwin, who accompanied the commission as the ship's surgeon, to exiled Chilean general José Miguel Carrera. In April, Bland left Buenos Aires and went overland to Mendoza, Argentina then across the Uspallata Pass to Santiago, Chile. Meanwhile, the rest of the group departed the Isla Margarita on June 25, 1818, and returned to Norfolk, Virginia on July 8. A week later, Bland left Valparaíso and arrived in Philadelphia, Pennsylvania, on October 29, 1818. The findings of the commissioners differed widely so much that they offered independent statements rather than one joint statement. Regarding the Government of Buenos Ayres, Secretary of State Adams summarized in his memoirs that "Bland holds them in abhorrence and contempt". Unlike the reports of the others who commented nearly only on political, military, and commercial matters, Bland's were longer and provided more discussion on geography and agriculture. He was impressed by the agricultural possibilities of Chile. The protagonists of the South American trip were all given "positions of trust" after their return.

== Federal judicial service ==
Despite rumors of privateering, Bland received a recess appointment from President Monroe to a seat to the United States District Court for the District of Maryland vacated by Judge James Houston, on November 23, 1819. Formally nominated on January 3, 1820, Bland was confirmed by the United States Senate on January 5, 1820, and received his commission the same day. Bland served for four years, and resigned on August 16, 1824, to be appointed Chancellor of Maryland.

== Chancellor of Maryland ==
Bland said:

I determined, to make every effort to acquire a complete knowledge of the peculiar principles and practice of the Court of Chancery of Maryland to which my attention had been so rarely drawn and for which I had had, for many years in the judicial stations I previously held, so little use. Upon inquiry I soon found that anything like an accurate knowledge of those principles was only to be gathered from the records themselves, to which I therefore resorted and after a careful perusal noted the course of proceeding, and occasionally made short digests of such cases as appeared most likely to be useful thereafter. In this way I collected a considerable mass of information, which has greatly facilitated my official labors.

Shortly after his appointment, a ruling by Bland displeased a party to the suit, who persuaded the Maryland House of Delegates to attempt to abolish the office of Chancellor, and failing that, to eliminate the salary for the position. The Maryland Senate rejected initial efforts to reduce the Chancellor's salary from $3,400 to $2,200 or $2,500, but eventually passed a House bill that made no provision for the salary, in order to avoid a fiscal crisis. In the next session of the legislature, Bland presented a memorandum arguing that the actions of the legislature threatened the independence of the judiciary. This appeal succeeded, and the legislature thereafter passed a bill to permanently fix the salary of the Chancellor at the sum of $3,400, and to pay Bland in arrears at that rate.

His opinions tended to be lengthy and to summarize substantial amounts of doctrine. An example is his opinion in Gwinn vs. Payson, written while he was sitting as Judge of the Baltimore County Court. The case involved a fairly simple bill in equity to have a certain deed set aside, and the property mentioned therein sold to satisfy a mortgage held by the complainants. Bland doubted his jurisdiction over the matter due to his uncertainty as to the constitutionality of the act clothing his court with chancery powers. He delivered a 94-page opinion, including 65 pages addressing the power of the judicial branch of the government to annul a law enacted by the legislative branch on the ground if its being in conflict with the Constitution of the State. Bland found that the legislature had exceeded its power in granting original equity jurisdiction to the court, but also noted that the parties had expressed their wish to have the matter resolved by the court, and therefore granted a consent decree.

== Death ==
Described as a "gentleman of the old school", Bland died in his bed from "a disease of the heart" in Annapolis, Maryland on November 16, 1846. He was buried at Cemetery Creek (now St. Anne's Cemetery) in Annapolis. He was memorialized at a meeting of the Bar of Baltimore, by a committee chaired by United States Chief Justice Roger B. Taney and including William Henry Norris, with addresses delivered by distinguished members including Charles F. Mayer and Reverdy Johnson. It has been noted with some irony that Bland's will was the subject of litigation in Mayo vs. Bland, 4 Md. Chancery, 484.

== Family ==
Coat of Arms of Theodorick Bland

Chancellor Bland was a descendant of Governor Richard Bennett and Bennett's son-in-law, Theodorick Bland of Westover. He was the son of Theodorick Bland (born 1746) and Sarah Fitzhugh (1748–1793). Bland's uncle was Thomas Fitzhugh and his sister was Sophia Bland. Bland married Sarah Glen (born 1770), the widow of John Davis. (Note: "Davis" or "Davies" is noted in various sources as the married name for Sarah Glen and the surname of Elizabeth Glen. Warfield states that Sarah Glen was the widow of Baltimore Mayor Jacob Davies; however, Mayor Davies died in 1857 – thirteen years after Theodorick Bland. Warfield also notes names for Bland's mother and grandfather that are inconsistent with other sources.) Bland's two step-children by this marriage were:

- Elizabeth Glen Davies married John Stuart Skinner on March 10, 1812.
- Jacob G. Davies

The marriage of Bland to Sarah Glen produced at least two children:

- Sarah Battaile Fitzhugh Bland married Captain Isaac Mayo in 1835. Their daughter, Sarah Battaile Mayo, resided in the Peggy Stewart House in Annapolis and married Thomas Henry Gaither in 1857.
- William G. Bland

John Hesselius painted a portrait of Bland's mother, Sarah Fitzhugh Bland, in 1767. It is the only signed work by Hesselius for which there is a record of the value of the commission: £20 and sixteen shillings. The Maryland Historical Society eventually received the portrait from Chancellor Bland's great-grandsons in 1945.

Theodorick Bland was cousin to Lucy Fitzhugh, the mother of George Fitzhugh. Their common grandfather was Colonel Henry Fitzhugh (1723-1783), the father of Sarah Fitzhugh Bland, who likewise commissioned a portrait by John Hesselius in 1751.

Between 1828 and 1845, Bland purchased a 300-acre farm owned by John Crompton Weems and known as "LaGrange"; under his ownership, the property became known as "Blandair". (Note: Sources differ and state that Bland acquired Blandair in "1828 or thereabout", 1836, or 1845.) Sarah Bland Mayo inherited the property upon her father's death and eventually gave the property to her daughter, Sarah Mayo Gaither, as a wedding present in 1857. (Note: Another account states that Thomas Gaither and Sarah Mayo Gaither inherited the property after Isaac Mayo's death.)

== Sources ==
- A summary of Bland's most notable judicial opinions: William J. Marbury, "The High Court of Chancery and the Chancellors of Maryland," Report of the Tenth Annual Meeting of the Maryland State Bar Association, (1905): 137–155.

Legal offices
Preceded by James Houston	Judge of the United States District Court for the District of Maryland; 1819–1824	Succeeded by Elias Glenn
Preceded by John Johnson Sr.	Chancellor of Maryland; 1824–1846	Succeeded by John Johnson Jr.
