= Alexander Contee Hanson Sr. =

American lawyer (1749–1806)

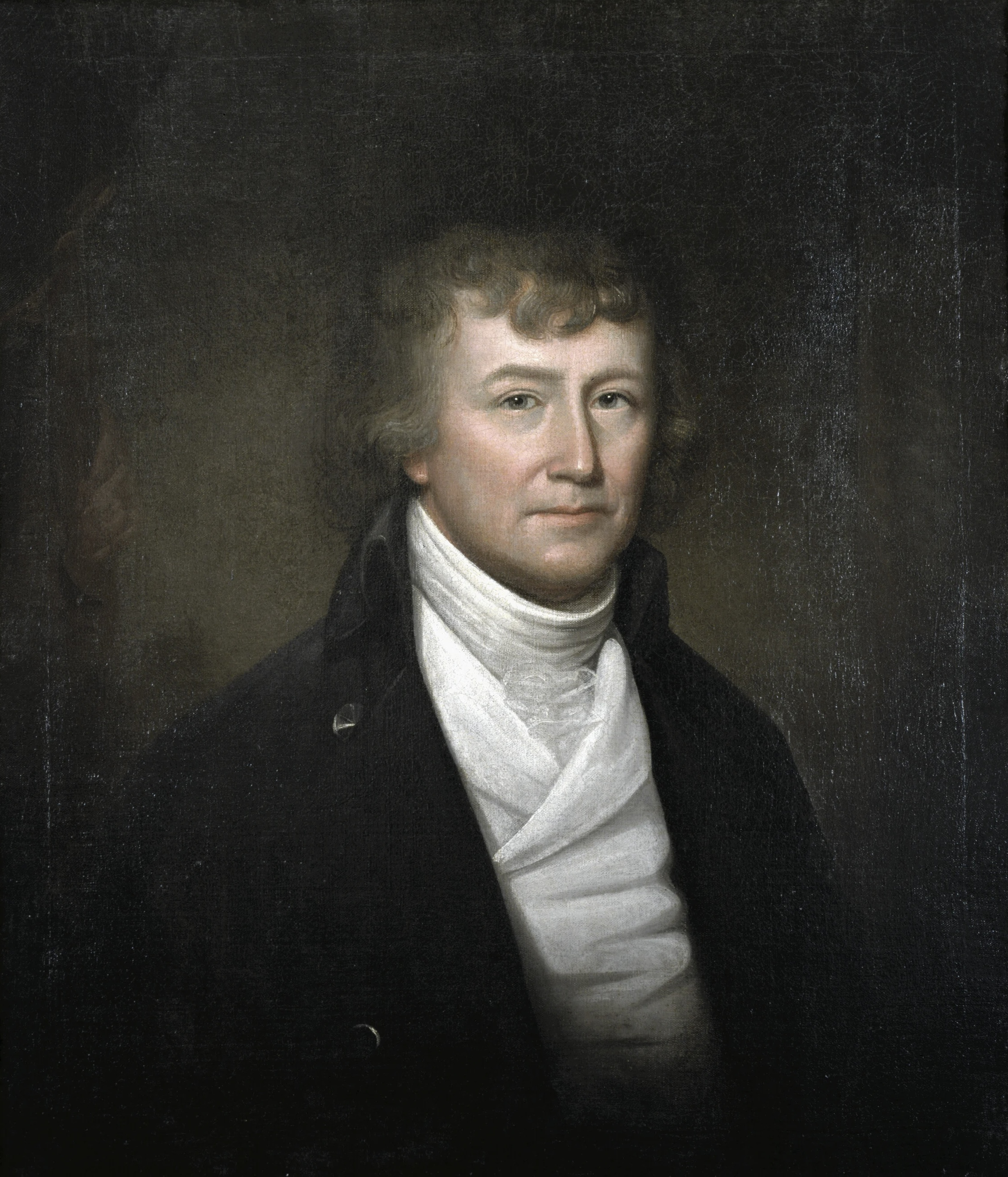
- Portrait by Rembrandt Peale, c. 1798

2nd Chancellor of Maryland
- In office October 3, 1789 – January 16, 1806
- Preceded by: John Rogers
- Succeeded by: William Kilty

Personal details
- Born: October 22, 1749 Maryland
- Died: January 16, 1806 (aged 56) Hancock, Maryland
- Party: Federalist
- Spouse: Rebecca Howard
- Children: 3, including Alexander
- Parent(s): John Hanson; Jane Contee
- Education: College of Philadelphia

Alexander Contee Hanson Sr. (October 22, 1749 – January 16, 1806) was an attorney who served as Chancellor of Maryland from 1789 until his death.

== Early life ==
Alexander Contee Hanson was born in Maryland on October 22, 1749. He was the eldest son of John Hanson and Jane (née Contee) Hanson. His father was a Revolutionary War financier and statesman, who was a signer of the Articles of Confederation and first President of the Congress created by those Articles. Alexander Hanson was educated at the College of Philadelphia and read law in Annapolis. His brother, Peter Contee Hanson, died in the battle of Fort Washington during the War.

His paternal grandparents were Samuel Hanson and Elizabeth (née Storey) Hanson.

== Career ==
After his legal education, he planned to travel to England to be ordained for the ministry of the Protestant Episcopal Church, but his voyage ended in a shipwreck. He was rescued and taken to Philadelphia, where he became the Assistant Private Secretary to General George Washington. Hanson's cousin, and the future appointee to the Chancellorship, Colonel Robert Hanson Harrison was Washington's Chief Secretary.

In 1776, Hanson fell ill, and after two months service, had to leave General Washington's service. Hanson visited headquarters just after the battle of Brandywine, and was present when the two armies, just on the eve of battle, were separated by a violent rain. Still very ill, Hanson accompanied Washington to a farmer's house, where Washington offered him his bed. Alexander Hamilton lay down on the floor in the corner, and afterwards Colonel Hanson would good-humoredly remark that he "never saw a man look so like a cat".

On February 12, 1778, Hanson returned to Annapolis with Governor William Paca and Nicholas Thomas. Hanson was then appointed Judge of the General Court under the Constitution of 1776. In 1784, with Samuel Chase, he was appointed to digest Laws of Maryland from 1763. This work was done by himself and is known as "Hanson's Laws."

=== Pamphlet writings ===
During this period, Hanson took great interest in public affairs, and wrote a number of valuable pamphlets on both State and Federal questions, which attracted much notice. These pamphlets, which have been collected by the Maryland Historical Society, are as follows:

- Political Schemes and Calculations, 1784, on public credit;
- Considerations on the Proposed Removal of the Seat of Government, February 1786, what he considered to be his masterpiece in this field of literature;
- Remarks on the Proposed Plan of an Emission of Paper and on the Means of Effecting it, December 1786;
- Remarks on the Proposed Plan of a Federal Government, 1787, which, as the preceding, was written over the signature of "Aristides";
- Address of the Visitors and Governors of St. John's College to the Senate of Maryland, 1794.

These papers have been collected in the original prints and bound together by the Maryland Historical Society. All of them contain notes made by Chancellor Hanson in his own handwriting, from time to time up to his death. These throw a great deal of light upon public questions and the character of the public men of that day. In this same volume is a valuable manuscript from the hand of Charles W. Hanson, son of Senator Alexander Contee Hanson, and grandson of the Chancellor, giving a sketch of his life and much information about his family.

=== Court Judge ===
Hanson's reputation as a Judge rests principally upon his services upon the General Court Bench, because, although he was for nearly 18 years Chancellor of the State, there is no report of his decisions. The only record of his labors is what is given in the Court of Appeals' Reports when cases were taken from the High Court of Chancery to that Court on appeal. Here sometimes an opinion will be found, but more generally a short statement of his decree.

He delivered many opinions in the General Court, which are reported in Harris & McHenry's Reports, and these have been said to "amply attest his learning and ability". Marbury writes:

"I will call especial attention to the case of Calvert vs. Eden, 2 H. & McH., 334, as being of great interest. From the report of this case I should suppose that it must have been one of the greatest legal battles in the history of our courts. This case raised many interesting questions in the law of real property, as a glance at the head notes will show, and gave a magnificent opportunity for the famous lawyers engaged in the case to display their erudition and eloquence. Cook & Jennings were for the plaintiff and J. T. Chase and Luther Martin for the defendants. A number of opinions by Daniel Dulany were filed in the case, and an opinion by the famous Francis Hargrave, of Lincoln's Inn (author of notes upon Coke Littleton) and John Hall, all of which are published in the report of the case. Judge Hanson delivered the opinion in this case and an appeal from the General Court to the Court of Appeals he was affirmed without any other opinion being rendered. This case involved many points of interest and importance, but as they are succinctly stated in the head notes of the case, I will not attempt to state them here.

As an illustration of the regard in which the opinions of Chancellor Hanson were held I may refer to the case of Damarest vs. Wynkoop. * * * The opinion in this case was delivered by Chancellor Kent, and the question was one similar to Lamar vs. Clarke, 3 H. & McH., 338, a question of limitations. The decree of Chancellor Hanson was reversed by the Court of Appeals in the latter case. Chancellor Kent, in the case first mentioned, adopted the view of Hanson instead of that of the Court of Appeals, and in doing so used this language:

"* * * This is clear judicial sanction to the doctrine of Lord Talbot, and, therefore, as well upon authority as upon the reason and policy of the rule I conclude that the Court of Appeals of Maryland was in this instance mistaken; and with respect to the learned Chancellor's opinion, notwithstanding the reversal, I trust I may without offense be permitted to say 'Scaevolve assentior.' " This case and Chancellor Hanson's opinion were afterwards adopted by the Court of Appeals in Hertie vs. Schwartze, 3 Md., 383, where its former decision was overruled."

=== Chancellor of Maryland ===
On October 3, 1789, Hanson was appointed to succeed John Rogers, deceased, Chancellor of the State of Maryland. This appointment was made after the place had been offered to Robert Hanson Harrison, who was at that time Judge of the General Court, but had been offered a seat on the Supreme Court of the United States. Harrison was strongly urged by Alexander Hamilton to accept the appointment, and finally declined the Chancellorship for this reason, but died on his way to take his seat. Hanson was about this time himself offered a United States district court judgeship, but declined.

While serving as Chancellor, Hanson was a member of the Convention called to consider the proposed Constitution of the United States. He was a strong advocate of its adoption. In 1789, he was appointed to digest the Testamentary Laws of the State. He was a Presidential Elector in both of the elections of General Washington to the Presidency. He was a visitor of St. John's College and a great friend of that institution. In 1803, he was appointed to a committee to defend it against its adversaries.

== Personal life ==
Chancellor Hanson was married to Rebecca Howard (1759–1806) of Annapolis. Together, they were the parents of three children:

- Charles Wallace Hanson (1783–1853), a judge who married Rebecca Dorsey Ridgely (1786–1837) of Hampton, the eldest daughter of Charles Ridgely, governor of Maryland from 1815 to 1818.
- Alexander Contee Hanson (1786–1819), who became a U.S. Senator and who married Priscilla Dorsey (1789–1849), daughter of Edward Dorsey and inheritor of the Belmont Estate.
- Mary Jane Hanson (1791–1815), who married Thomas Peabody Grosvenor (1778–1817), a U.S. Representative from New York.

Hanson seems to have been a religious man and of the kindest disposition. He was charitable, and many acts of kindness are related by his grandson. He took several young men under his care and treated them with a fatherly kindness. He died by a stroke of apoplexy January 16, 1806.

=== Honors ===
Chancellor Hanson received the degree of LL.D. from one of the Universities, but the identity of the institution is not known.
