= Henry D. Todd Jr. =

U.S. Army major general

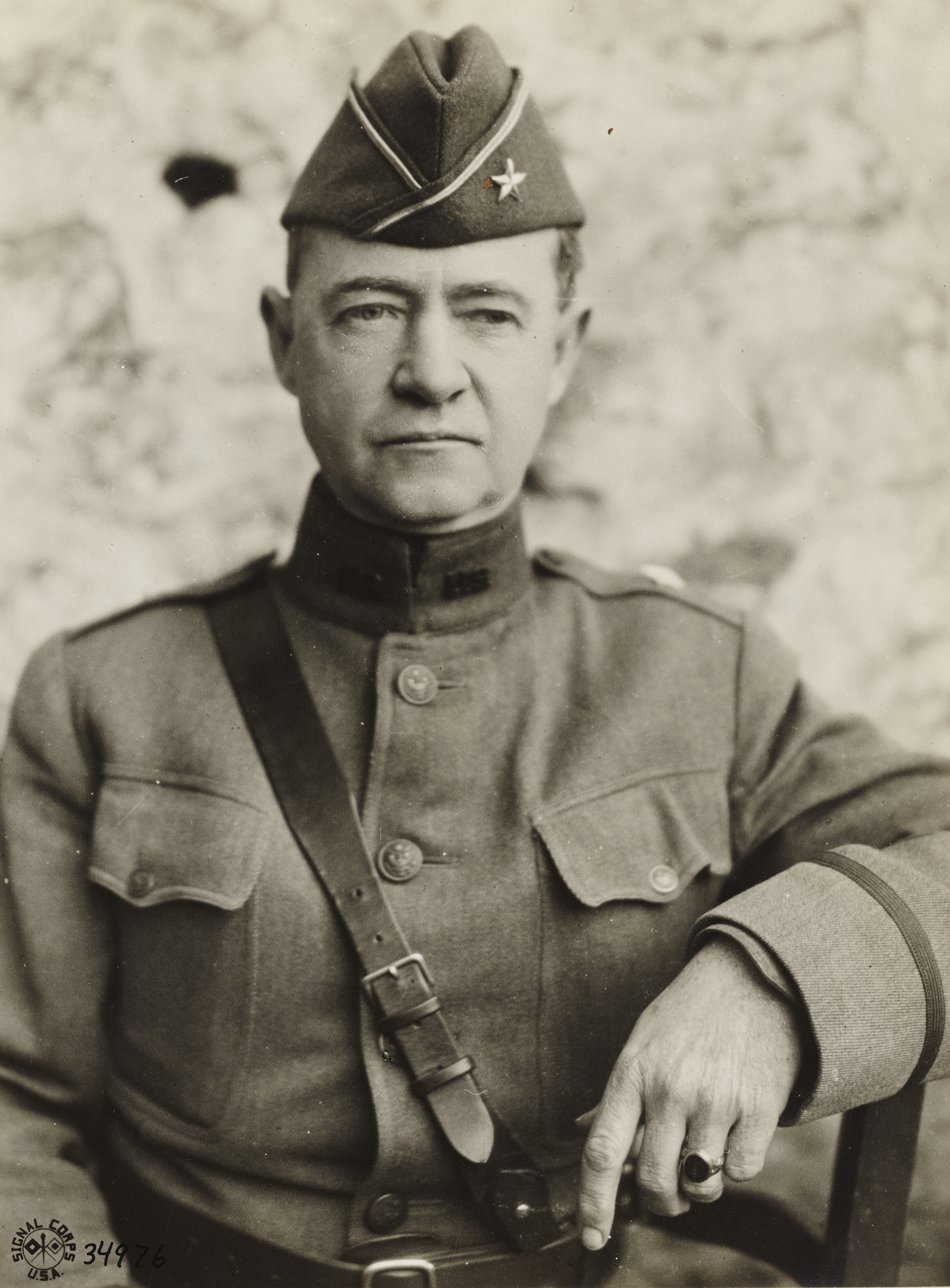
- Born: August 29, 1866; Claverack, New York, U.S.
- Died: January 22, 1964 (aged 97); Washington, D.C., U.S.
- Burial place: Arlington National Cemetery
- Education: University of Pennsylvania (BS, 1886)
- Spouse: Emma Northrop Greene (m. 1897–1955, her death)
- Children: 3
- Relatives: John Johnson Sr. (great-grandfather); John Johnson Jr. (grandfather); Reverdy Johnson (grand-uncle)
- Military career
- Allegiance: United States
- Branch: United States Army
- Service years: 1890–1930
- Rank: Major General
- Units: Field Artillery Branch; Coast Artillery Corps
- Commands: Battery K, 7th Field Artillery; Battery G, 1st Field Artillery Regiment; Fort Mott, New Jersey; Fort McKinley, Maine; Fort Adams, Rhode Island; Coast Defenses of Narragansett Bay; 33rd Division; 58th Artillery Brigade; 1st Division Artillery; 91st Division Artillery; 89th Division Artillery; 31st Coast Artillery Brigade; Coast Defenses of Subic Bay; Coast Defenses of Manila Bay; Ninth Coast Artillery District; Hawaiian Coast Artillery Brigade; Coast Artillery School; Third Coast Artillery District
- Conflicts: Spanish–American War; World War I
- Awards: Army Distinguished Service Medal; Silver Star (3); Purple Heart

Henry Davis Todd Jr. (August 29, 1866 – January 22, 1964) was a career officer in the United States Army. A veteran of the Spanish–American War and World War I he attained the rank of major general and was most prominent for his command of several Field Artillery and Coast Artillery units during and after the First World War.

Todd was born in Claverack, New York and was the son of a United States Navy officer and professor at the United States Naval Academy. He graduated from the University of Pennsylvania in 1886 and the United States Military Academy in 1890. Assigned to the Field Artillery, Todd served in positions of increasing rank and responsibility for the next 40 years, including assignments in the Coast Artillery.

During the Spanish–American War, Todd helped raise the new 7th Artillery and commanded a battery as the regiment took part in the coastal defenses of Florida and New York. During World War I, he was promoted to temporary brigadier general, then temporary major general, and commanded the 58th Artillery Brigade, a unit of the 33rd Division. He later commanded the field artillery of several Army divisions, and after the war remained in Europe on occupation duty. His First World War service was recognized with award of the Army Distinguished Service Medal, three awards of the Silver Star, and the Purple Heart.

After World War I, Todd returned to the permanent rank of colonel before earning promotions to permanent brigadier general and permanent major general. His later career included command of several Coast Artillery units and culminated with assignment as commandant of the Coast Artillery School. Todd retired in 1930. He died in Washington, D.C. on January 22, 1964, and was buried at Arlington National Cemetery.

== Early life ==
Henry D. Todd Jr. was born in Claverack, New York on August 29, 1866, the son of Flora (Johnson) Todd, daughter of Maryland Chancellor John Johnson Jr. and Henry D. Todd, a rear admiral in the United States Navy and faculty member at the United States Naval Academy. The younger Todd attended private schools and St. John's College Preparatory School in Annapolis, Maryland. He then began attendance at the University of Pennsylvania (Penn), from which he graduated in 1886 with a Bachelor of Science degree in engineering. Todd was a member of the university's baseball team and earned academic honors during all four years he was a student.

After graduating from Penn, Todd was appointed to the United States Military Academy by Maryland Congressman Barnes Compton. He graduated in 1890, ranked 7th of 54. He was commissioned as a second lieutenant of Field Artillery and assigned to the 3rd Artillery Regiment.

== Start of career ==
Todd initially served with the 3rd Artillery at Washington Barracks in Washington, D.C. In January 1891 he was transferred to the 5th Artillery and in May he resumed serving with the 3rd Artillery. In January 1893 Todd relocated with the 3rd Artillery when it was assigned to Key West Barracks, Florida. He next served at Fort McPherson, Georgia, where he remained from February to August 1894.

From August 1894 to May 1898, Todd was assigned detached duty as a faculty member with West Point's Department of Ordnance and Gunnery. In February 1898, he was promoted to first lieutenant, and in March he was transferred from the 3rd Artillery. In May, Todd joined the newly created 7th Artillery at Fort Slocum, New York as it organized and trained for duty during the Spanish–American War, and he performed recruiting duty in Buffalo until July.

Todd was with the 7th Artillery's Battery K when it served with the Siege Artillery Battalion at Camp Rodgers, near Ybor City, Florida in August 1898 and Fort Totten, New York in September and October. From October 1898 to July 1900, Todd was on duty at Fort Schuyler, New York. From July 1900 to July 1901, Todd attended the Artillery Officers Course at Fort Monroe, Virginia. He simultaneously commanded Battery G, 1st Artillery and served as the garrison's engineer officer. Todd was promoted to captain in February 1901, and he completed the course as an honor graduate.

== Continued career ==
From July 1901 to October 1902, Todd was assigned to the staff of the artillery district based at Fort Hamilton, New York. From October 1902 to November 1903, Todd was a student at Fort Totten's School of Submarine Defense. (Note: The School of Submarine Defense taught techniques for using underwater mines to protect harbors.) From December 1903 to December 1905, he was adjutant of the Artillery District of Narragansett, based at Fort Adams, Rhode Island. From December 1905 to November 1907, Todd was based at Fort Banks, Massachusetts as artillery engineer for the Artillery District of Boston.

Beginning in 1907, Todd was a student at the United States Army War College, from which he graduated in September 1908. In January 1908, he was promoted to major. After brief service at Fort Monroe in October and November 1908, Todd was assigned to duty with the Army General Staff, appointed as secretary of the Army War College and the general staff's second section. From October 1910 to December 1912 Todd served in Manila, assigned as assistant chief of staff for the Philippine Division and chief of the division's military information office.

From January to March 1913, was commander of the post at Fort Mott, New Jersey. From March 1913 to July 1915, Todd was commander of the post at Fort McKinley, Maine. He was promoted to lieutenant colonel in September 1913. From July 1915 to June 1917, Todd was posted to Fort Monroe and assigned as editor of the Journal of U.S. Artillery. In September 1916, Todd was promoted to colonel in the Coast Artillery Corps.

== World War I ==
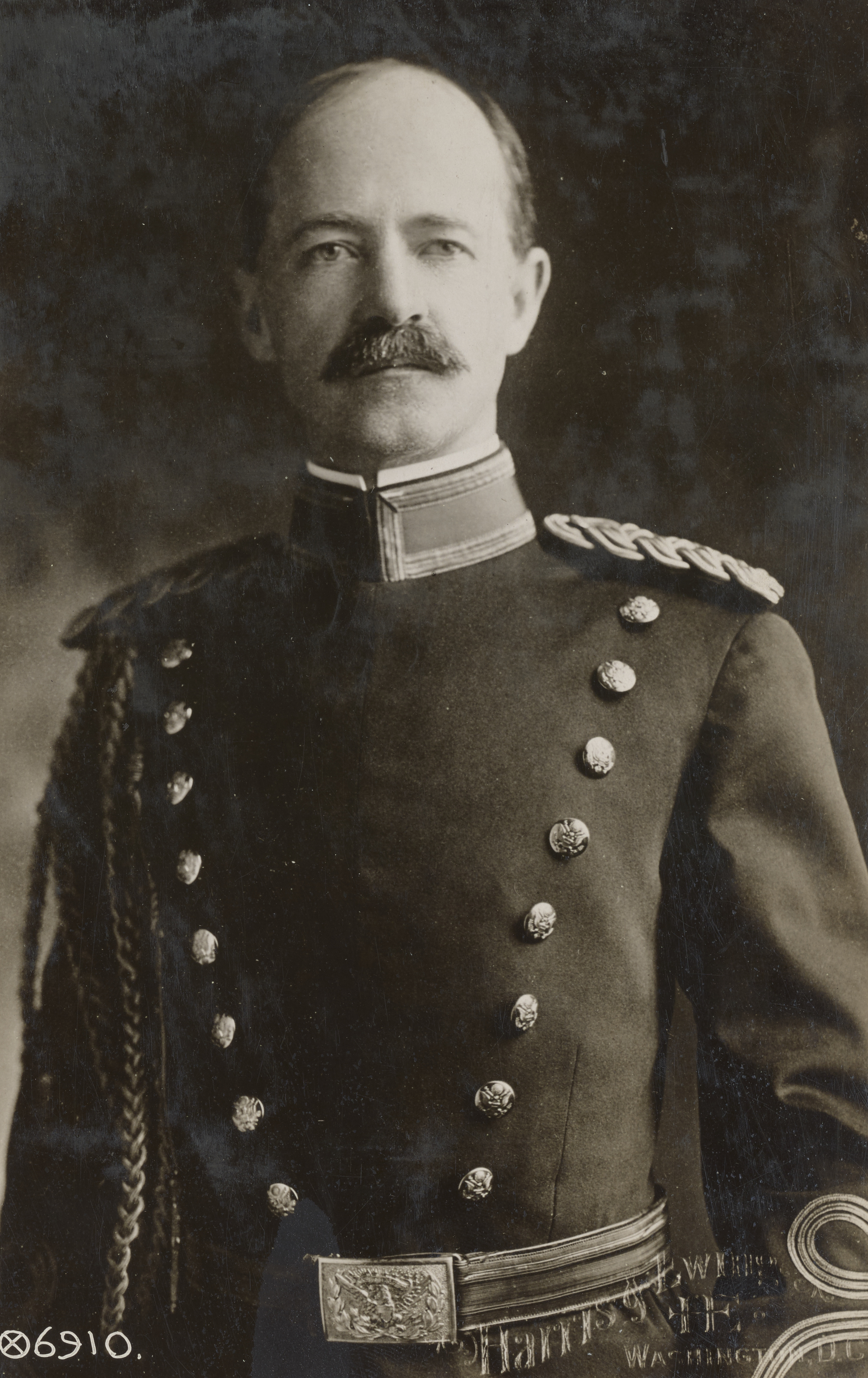
1918 War Department photo of Todd as a temporary brigadier general.

In June 1917, a few weeks after the American entry into World War I, Todd was assigned as commander of Fort Adams and the Coast Defenses of Narragansett Bay. In August he was promoted to temporary brigadier general and assigned to Camp Logan, Texas as commander of the 58th Artillery Brigade, a unit of the 33rd Division. He also commanded the division for the first three months of its organization and training until Major General George Bell Jr. arrived to take command. After completing organization and training, the division arrived in France in June 1918, and underwent additional training at the Valdahon-Ornans training area until entering combat in August.

Todd's brigade moved to the Toul sector in September. In the middle of the month, the 58th Artillery Brigade took part in the Battle of Saint-Mihiel. Later that month, Todd was assigned to command the 1st Division Artillery, an organization that included his brigade, the 1st Field Artillery Brigade, and two Coast Artillery regiments. Beginning in late September, Todd's command took part in the Meuse–Argonne offensive. Near the end of the month, Todd was assigned to command the 91st Division Artillery, which included his 58th Artillery Brigade, the 158th Artillery Brigade, and one battalion of the 65th Coast Artillery Regiment.

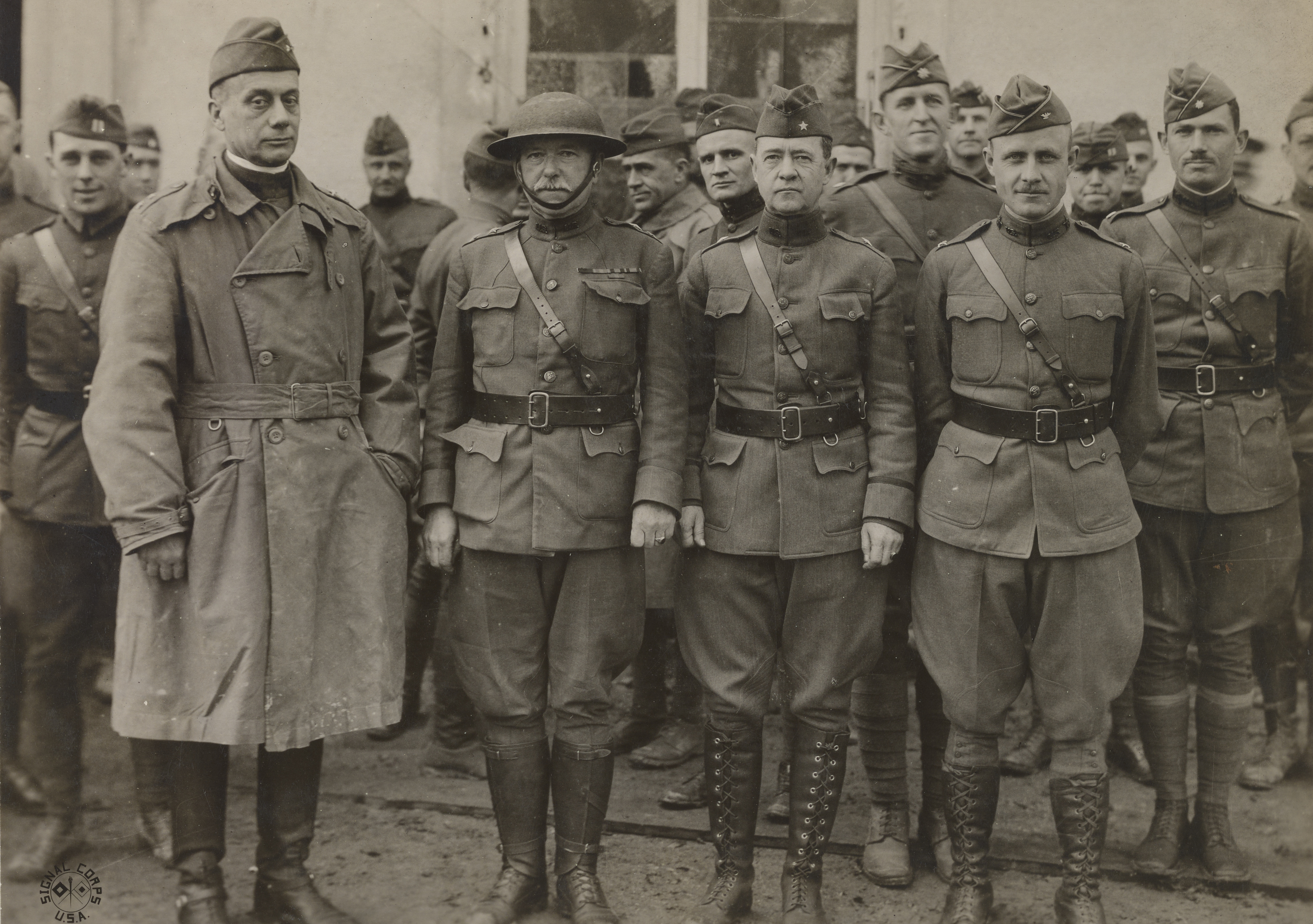
From left to right: Major General William M. Wright, commanding the 89th Division, Major General Frank L. Winn, to succeed Wright in command of the 89th, and Brigadier General Henry D. Todd Jr., commanding the 58th Field Artillery Brigade, Stenay, Meuse, France, November 12, 1918. Standing behind Wright is his aide-de-camp, Captain Charles H. Gerhardt.

In October, the 91st Division was relieved by the 32nd Division, and Todd continued to command the 58th Artillery Brigade in support of the 32nd. After resting and refitting in mid-October, Todd's brigade was assigned to support the 89th Division near Epinonville. On October 30, Todd was wounded by a shell fragment while conducting forward reconnaissance. He was evacuated for treatment, and on November 6, Todd returned to command of the 89th Division Artillery, which he led during combat in the Tailly, Ardennes area until the end of the war.

After the Armistice with Germany on November 11, 1918, Todd and his brigade were based in Luxembourg and performed post-war occupation duty of Germany. In May 1919, Todd led the 58th Artillery Brigade back to the United States, and it was demobilized at Camp Grant, Illinois in June. For his wartime service, Todd received the Purple Heart, three Citation Stars (later converted to the Silver Star medal), and the Army Distinguished Service Medal.

=== Army Distinguished Service Medal citation ===
The President of the United States of America, authorized by Act of Congress, July 9, 1918, takes pleasure in presenting the Army Distinguished Service Medal to Brigadier General Henry Davis Todd, Jr., United States Army, for exceptionally meritorious and distinguished services to the Government of the United States, in a duty of great responsibility during World War I. As Commanding General of the 58th Field Artillery Brigade, 33d Division, General Todd demonstrated marked skill as an artillery officer in the preparations for the attack of the 5th Corps on the Kriemhilde Stellung on 1 November 1918, and in support of the 89th Division in its further advance and crossing of the Meuse River from 6 to 11 November 1918. the Brigade which he commanded effectively supported the 1st, 91st, 32d, and 89th Divisions, during the period of the operations to which it served with them. His services have been of particular value to the American Expeditionary Forces. Service: Army Rank: Brigadier General Division: 33d Division GENERAL ORDERS: War Department, General Orders No. 24 (1920)

=== First Silver Star citation ===
By direction of the President, under the provisions of the act of Congress approved July 9, 1918 (Bul. No. 43, W.D., 1918), Brigadier General Henry Davis Todd, Jr., United States Army, is cited by the Commanding General, American Expeditionary Forces, for gallantry in action and a silver star may be placed upon the ribbon of the Victory Medals awarded him. Brigadier General Todd distinguished himself by gallantry in action while serving as Commanding General, 58th Field Artillery Brigade, 33d Division, American Expeditionary Forces, in action near Romagne, France, 30 October 1918, in making a personal reconnaissance under heavy machine gun and shell fire. (First Citation)

== Later career ==
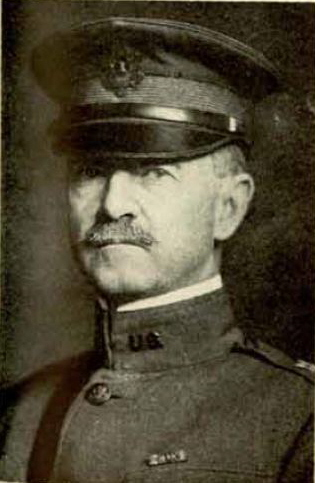
Todd as commandant of the Coast Artillery School

Todd as a retired major general in 1939

After the war, Todd reverted to the permanent rank of colonel. In 1920, he received the honorary degree of Master of Science from the University of Pennsylvania. From August 1919 to June 1920, he attended the Army War College for the second time. He was then assigned as a student at the Naval War College, where he remained until November. In September 1920, Todd was again promoted to temporary brigadier general. He left the Naval War College before completing the program because he was assigned to command the 31st Coast Artillery Brigade at Fort Lewis, Washington, which he led from December 1920 to July 1921. His temporary promotion expired in March 1921, and in April 1921 he received promotion to permanent brigadier general.

In August 1921, Todd was assigned to command the Coast Defenses of Subic Bay and Manila Bay in the Philippines. In 1923, Todd returned to the United States and was assigned to command the Ninth Coast Artillery District in San Francisco. He then commanded the Ninth Corps Area from March to June 1926. In 1926, he was assigned to command the Hawaiian Coast Artillery Brigade and in 1927 he was promoted to major general. From 1929 to 1930, Todd was commandant of the Coast Artillery School at Fort Monroe and commander of the Third Coast Artillery District.

== Death and burial ==
Todd left the Army on August 31, 1930, as a result of having reached the mandatory retirement age of 64. In retirement, his activities included service as a vice president of the West Point Association of Graduates and Washington, D.C. chapter president of the Coast Artillery Association. He died at his daughter's home in Washington, D.C. on January 22, 1964. Todd was buried at Arlington National Cemetery.

== Family ==
In 1897, Todd married Emma Northrop Greene (1869–1955). They were the parents of three children – Henry Poultney (born and died in 1899), Harriet Stewart (1900–1994), and Harrison Tyler (1905–2001).
