= Isaac Mayo =

American naval officer

Commodore Isaac Mayo
- Born: 1794
- Died: May 10, 1861 (aged 67); Anne Arundel, Maryland, US
- Military career
- Branch: United States Navy
- Service years: 1809–1861
- Rank: Commodore
- Commands: USS Poinsett; USS Mississippi; USS Constitution; Africa Squadron
- Conflicts: War of 1812 Second Seminole War; Suppression of the Slave Trade; Mexican–American War: Siege of Veracruz

Commodore Isaac Mayo (1794 – May 10, 1861) was a United States naval officer who served in the War of 1812, Second Seminole War, and Mexican War. Mayo is credited with influencing the location of the United States Naval Academy at Annapolis and is noted for his controversial resignation and Presidential dismissal from the service at the start of the Civil War.

== Life ==
Isaac Mayo was born in 1794 in Anne Arundel County Maryland. He was the nephew of United States Navy Admiral Joseph Mayo. He married Sarah Battaile Fitzhugh Bland, daughter of Theodoric Bland, a federal judge and Chancellor of Maryland, and Sarah Glen in 1835. They had one daughter, Sarah

The Mayos resided in historic Gresham house at Mayo's Neck plantation, parts of which had formerly been known as Cotter's Desire, Love's Neck, and Selby's Marsh. The plantation had previously been owned by the pirate William Cotter and wife Jane Gassaway, who purchased it two years after the death of Jane's father Colonel Nicholas Gassaway (Mysteriously, the Colonel's and his son's gravestones were both found there in different centuries, though both had lived and died at the Love's Neck residence while Gresham house was still owned and occupied by Greshams on rented land). Commodore Mayo also owned a farm in Elkridge and Sarah inherited Blandair from her father in 1846.

Commodore Mayo died of a gunshot wound at Gresham house on or before the morning of May 18, 1861, the same day on which he was dismissed from the Navy by order of President Abraham Lincoln for his eloquent but aggressive letter of resignation. He is buried beneath a tall stone spire in the Strawberry Hill Cemetery at the US Naval Academy.

The 2500+ resident community of Mayo, Maryland, as well as Mayo Road (route 214), the Mayo Peninsula, and Mayo Elementary School all bear his name.

== Military service ==
=== Enlistment and War of 1812 ===
Isaac Mayo entered service in the United States Navy at the age of 16 in 1809. He was first posted to the USS Wasp as a midshipman under Captain James Lawrence. He followed the Captain from the Wasp to the brig Argus and then the USS Hornet where he served during the War of 1812. He was advanced to Lieutenant on February 4, 1815. He received a Congressional Medal of Valor for his actions during the war.

=== Earliest reference to "Uncle Sam" ===
A letter dated May 1, 1810, written by 16-year-old Mayo aboard the USS Wasp, contains the first extant mention of the term "Uncle Sam" as a reference to the United States. In the letter, held in the USS Constitution Museum, Mayo describes how he coped with seasickness shortly after joining the crew of the Wasp, citing "Uncle Sam" as a possible product of Navy slang: ""Oh could I have got on shore in the h[e]ight of it, I swear that uncle Sam, as they call him, would certainly forever have lost the services of at least one sailor."

=== Second Seminole war ===
In 1840, Commander Isaac Mayo was assigned command of the sidewheel steam gunboat USS Poinsett. He later commanded a squadron of gunboats during the campaign in which the Poinsett remained active until August 1842.

=== United States Naval Academy ===
In 1845, Captain Mayo sat on the 5 member board to determine the location of a permanent naval academy for the United States Navy. Knowing the advantages of the Fort Severn location, Mayo is credited with helping steer the board's decision to locate the academy there. He is said to have supported the location from the "first vote to the last". Following the establishment of the academy, Mayo was posted to examine midshipmen until, on the eve of the Mexican War, he was assigned command of USS Mississippi.

=== Mexican War ===
In the 1840s as US General Scott advanced on Veracruz, he requested artillery support from Commodore Matthew C. Perry and the United States Naval forces nearby. On March 23, Captain Mayo was among those who came ashore with 8" guns from his ship. The naval battery deployed consisted of three 68-pound shell guns and three thirty-two pounders firing solid shot, and over 200 seamen and others attached to each in order to transport the massive weapons through knee-deep mud. Officers drew lots for the honor of commanding the sand-bagged battery and after the first day under the command of Captain Aulick, it passed to Captain Mayo on the 25th. While under Mayo's command on the 25th, the battery was able to silence the guns of Veracruz leading to its unconditional surrender on the 28th. On March 30, 1847, General Scott left Captain Mayo and the naval garrison under his command to hold Tlacotalpan and Alvarado, of which Mayo was subsequently appointed governor.

Commodore Mayo buried cannonballs from Veracruz at his Gresham plantation as mementos of his victory there.

=== African Squadron ===
On December 9, 1852, Mayo was assigned to take command of the US African Squadron engaged in the prevention of US-flagged ships participating in the slave trade. He was assigned USS Constitution as his flagship. Mayo, a slave holder himself, whose farm in Elkridge South of Baltimore would experience a runaway slave issue as he departed for this duty assignment, had thus been assigned to further US anti-slavery policy.

It would be during Mayo's command of the squadron, on November 3, 1853, that Constitution would capture the last prize vessel taken by her in combat. That was the H.N. Gambrill, a schooner with no slaves aboard. It would be the only action of Mayo's two-year command of the squadron.

On April 17, 1855, he was relieved along with the USS Constitution by Capt. Thomas Crabbe, whose orders were extensive in the detailing of the intent and desire of the United States to thereby suppress the slave trade and prevent any vessel flying the US flag from engaging in it. In June, the 61-year-old officer was granted three months leave after two and a half years at sea on an 18th-century frigate, before returning to the examination of midshipmen at the academy.

== Resignation and dismissal ==
Following the outbreak of hostilities between the Confederacy and the United States, Commodore Mayo was the oldest and longest-serving of the some 300 Navy officers who chose not to support the union, some 100 of whom resigned their commissions. Mayo wrote to President Abraham Lincoln:

"For more than half a century it has been the pride of my life to hold office under the Government of the United States. For twenty-five, I have engaged in active sea-service and have never seen my flag dishonored, or the American arms disgraced by defeat. It was the hope of my old age that I might die, as I had lived, an officer in the Navy of a free Government. This hope has been taken from me. In adopting the policy of coercion, you have denied to millions of freemen the rights of the Constitution and in its stead you have placed the will of a sectional Party. As one of the oldest soldiers of America, I protest—in the name of humanity—against this "war against brethren!" I cannot fight against the Constitution while pretending to fight for it. You will therefore oblige me by accepting my resignation."

Lincoln, while granting other such requests, ordered Mayo's dismissal from the Navy effective May 18, 1861. However, Commodore Mayo had died May 10, 1861, of a gunshot wound at Gresham house.
