= Blandair =

Historic property in Ellicott City, Maryland

Coordinates: 39°12′44″N 76°50′11″W

Blandair Regional Park
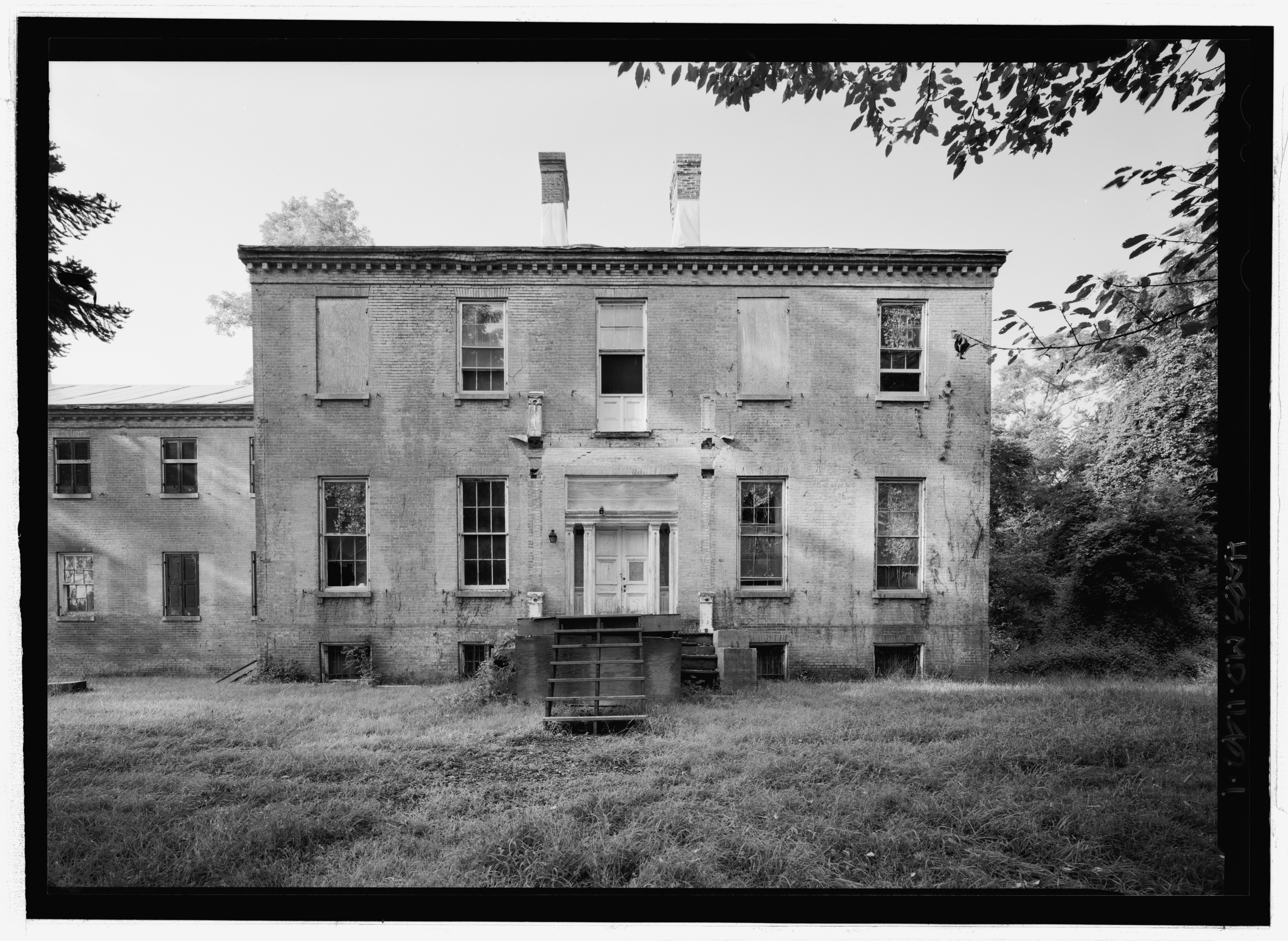
- Interactive map of Blandair Regional Park
- Type: County
- Location: Columbia, Maryland
- Area: 300-acre (1.2 km^{2})
- Created: 2014
- Operator: Howard County
- Status: Open; Ongoing Construction Official website

Blandair, also known as Blandair Farm, Blandair Park, and Blandair Regional Park, is 300 acres of former slave plantation located in Columbia, Maryland. The Blandair Foundation estate of Mrs. Smith was purchased by Howard County, Maryland in the late 1990s and is in the process of being developed as a regional park.

== History ==
In 1689, 1087 acres on Elk Ridge, in what was then colonial Maryland's Anne Arundel County, was surveyed for Edward Talbott. Known as "Talbott's Resolution Manor", Talbott bequeathed the property to his children, John and Elizabeth, who each received half of the property after his death in 1689. The land was patented to John and Elizabeth Talbott in 1714, and by 1716 they had quickly sold off 800 acres of the property. By 1753, four different owners were in possession of the original plot: William Hall (500 acres), Nicholas Gassaway (300 acres), Edward Dorsey (200 acres), and Rachel Norwood (87 acres).

In 1804, John Crompton Weems purchased a portion named "La Grange", which he eventually sold to his daughter-in-law, Martha P. Weems. (Note: Two references suggest that the property was already named "La Grange" when procured by John Crompton Weems, however, one states that Weems was responsible for naming the property "Lagrange".) Between 1828 and 1845, Theodorick Bland purchased the farm from the Weems family and under his ownership, the property became known as "Blandair". (Note: Sources differ and state that Bland acquired Blandair in "1828 or thereabout", 1836, 1843, or 1845.) Sarah Bland Mayo inherited the property upon her father's death and eventually gave the property to her daughter, Sarah Mayo Gaither, as a wedding present in 1857. (Note: Another account states that Thomas Gaither and Sarah Mayo Gaither inherited the property after Isaac Mayo's death.) Bland's descendants owned the property until the Gaithers sold the property in 1867. Another series of owners held the land until it was sold to Baltimore developer Henry E. Smith and his wife, Lillie, in 1937. After Lillie Smith died in 1979, Blandair was inherited by her daughter, Elizabeth, who resided on the property until her death in 1997. In 1997 or August 1998, Blandair was purchased from the Smith family by Howard County, Maryland using State Rural Legacy funds.

Legal challenges delayed planning efforts, but the courts eventually affirmed Howard County's ownership of the property. In 2010 initial construction began on a regional park. The phase I program is part of a series of Howard County projects purchasing historical preservation estates and converting them into a complex of income producing sports fields and facilities such as Troy Hill, and the James and Anne Robinson Nature Center. In 2014, the fields at Blandair were named after Frank S. Turner who helped secure initial open space funding for the $50 million project.

== Structures ==
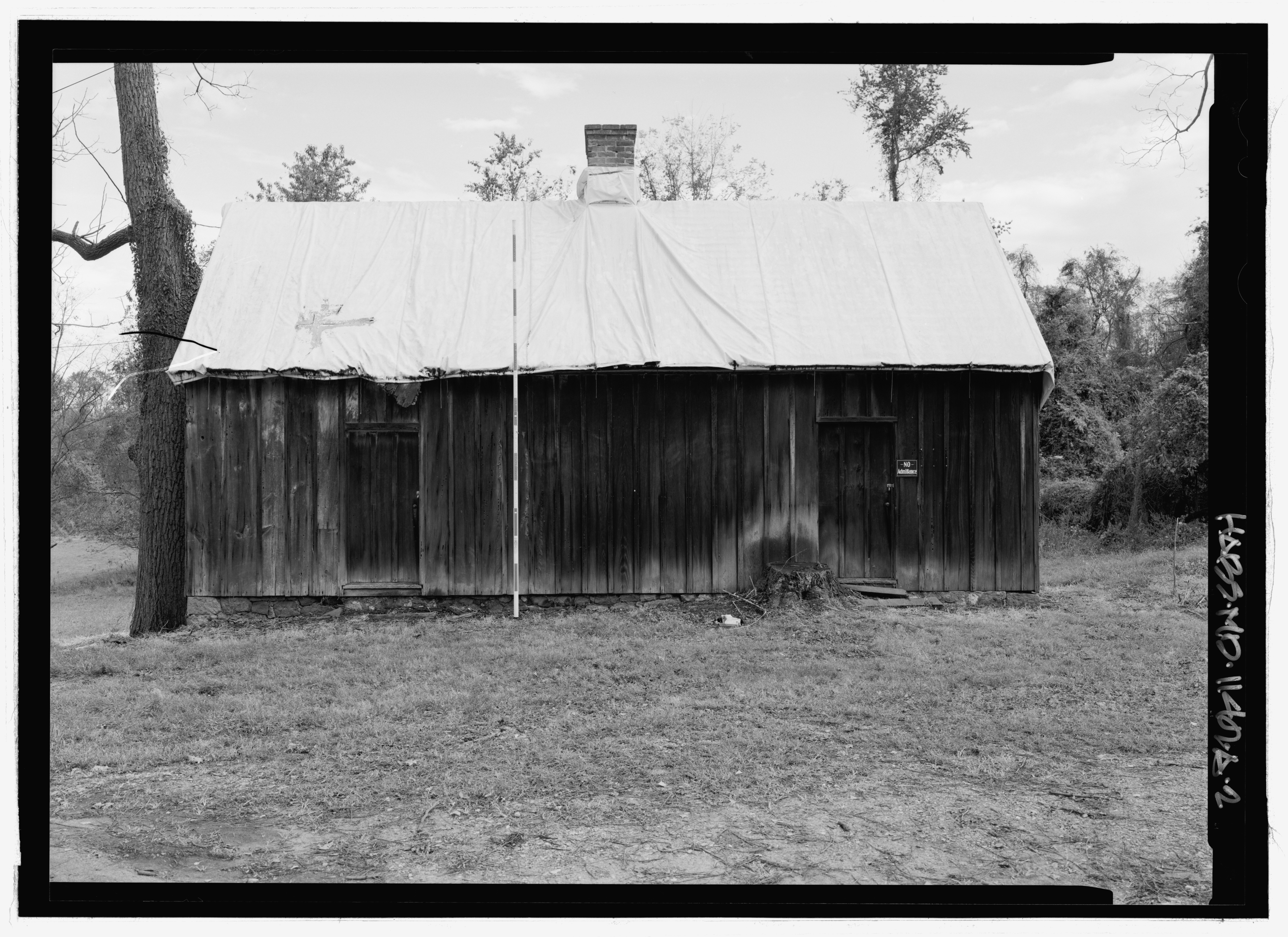
Blandair Slave Quarters

The estate was documented by the National Park Service's Historic American Buildings Survey in 2003. The main house, known as Blandair Mansion, was built by Bland's descendants in the mid-nineteenth century. As of 2011, the mansion is being restored by the Howard County Department of Recreation and Parks with assistance from the NPS's Historic Preservation Training Center and is slated to become the "historical centerpiece" of Blandair Regional Park. A small slave quarter, built around 1845, stands next to the main dwelling.

== See also ==
- List of Howard County properties in the Maryland Historical Trust
