= George Raynor (pirate) =

English pirate (1665-1743)

George Raynor (1665–1743) (Note: Last name also spelled Raynor, Reiner, or Rayner.) (Note: Captain George (and possibly "Josiah") Raynor should not be confused with the George Rayner, a crewman aboard the Adventure (captured by Joseph Bradish in 1698) who died while attempting to return to civilization. He is also not identified as the pirate William Rayner, who sailed with John Quelch and was tried but pardoned in 1704.)) was a pirate and privateer active in the Red Sea. As a pirate he captained the Batchelor’s Delight (or Loyal Jamaica). He story is often conflated with that of Josiah Raynor, an unrelated pirate active in the same time period and in the same areas.

== Biography ==
In 1687 Raynor married Sarah Higby in Lyme CT. Ostensibly sailing as a privateer against the French, Raynor had been elected captain of the Loyal Jamaica (later renamed Bachelor's Delight) in 1690.

He put in at Adam Baldridge’s pirate trading post near Madagascar in late 1691 after capturing a Moorish ship, along with William Cotter. After resupplying and repairing the ship they shared out treasure from their voyage and sailed back to the Province of South Carolina. He and his crew may have captured one last ship before ending their voyage, taking a vessel belonging to Carolina plantation owner Jonathan Amory. (Note: Amory was a friend of William Rhett (Rhett's daughter married Amory's son) who would later be captured by the pirate Hynde before turning pirate hunter to bring in Stede Bonnet.) Raynor ran the ship aground; its guns were seized for use by Charles Town. Absolved of piracy by 1692, he and the crew settled locally. Records show him recognized as a merchant, having been indemnified against accusations stemming from his pirate days. Raynor purchased a series of properties on Kiawah Island. (Note: At least one source (Trinkley) says Raynor got married in Charleston, but other genealogical records say he had been married earlier in Connecticut, to where he eventually returned.) His daughter married the son of former Carolina governor James Moore, and together with some of Moore's other children, eventually moved to Cape Fear.

References to Raynor after he left the Carolinas generally refer to Josiah Raynor, not George. At least one source (Jameson) claims these are the same pirate, but identification is not certain. "Raynor" appears again a few years later as an associate of Thomas Tew and Henry Every. Raynor - that is, Josiah Raynor - may have signed aboard for Thomas Tew's second voyage alongside Every in 1694, which resulted in Tew's death. Eventually making his way back to New York City around 1700, possibly with William Mayes, Raynor was suspected of piracy and had to petition a friend to intercede with Governor Benjamin Fletcher to release his treasure chest. After selling his Long Island property he settled in Connecticut.

== His Ship ==
There are several stories regarding the origin of Raynor's ship, the Loyal Jamaica or Royal Jamaica (or Bachelor's Delight).

According to one account, in 1683 near Guinea, privateer John Cook captured a Dutch merchantman which he named Batchelor’s Delight, which itself had been the Portsmouth when captured by Dutch privateers from its English owners. With Cook were William Dampier and Edward Davis, who would later captain the ship after Cook died in 1684,. Also aboard was Thomas Pinckney, who later joined Raynor's crew. They sailed around South America raiding Spanish shipping and towns in concert with Charles Swan's Cygnet and others.

After modest success and meeting defeat near Panama, the buccaneer fleet broke up in August 1685. Davis took the Batchelor’s Delight back around Cape Horn, eventually returning to the West Indies in 1688 and Philadelphia by that May. Shortly afterwards the 14-gun, 80-man Batchelor’s Delight was sold to its former crew; some sources claim that Raynor had now become Captain of the Batchelor’s Delight, returning to the Indian Ocean to sail against Portuguese and English shipping.

Other sources show the Batchelor's Delight in the hands of former crewman (and associate of Cook's) James Kelley ("James Gilliam") after Raynor's departure; Kelley continued his piracy in the Indian Ocean before he was captured by Moorish pirates in 1692. They burned his ship and killed many of the pirates, but Kelley and a few of his crew escaped their captors and made their way back to Madagascar. There they sailed with Robert Culliford for a time before returning to America alongside William Kidd; soon afterwards they were arrested, transported to London for trial, and executed. It is possible that Raynor and crew abandoned the Batchelor's Delight at Madagascar (where Kelley claimed it), so that the ship Loyal Jamaica in which Raynor returned to the Carolinas may have been a captured prize ship (renamed), or possibly a purchased or hired vessel, and not Davis' original ship.

Some authors claim that there were multiple ships of the same name (Bachelor's Delight / Batchelor's Delight) operating in the same time period.

2021 research by French historian Raynald Laprise has shown that Loyal Jamaica was a prize captured from the French by English privateers (of which Raynor was a crewmember) operating from Jamaica. It was sold to English merchants but the crew mutinied and elected Raynor as captain. They sailed to the Indian Ocean and took prizes, during which the ship was called Bachelor's Delight; James Kelley may have been captain for part of this period. They returned to Carolina, scuttled the ship at Sewee Bay, and took a pardon while paying the ship's original owners for its loss.

== See also ==
- Pirate Round, the route from America to the coast of Africa, to Madagascar, and into the Red Sea or Indian Ocean, attributed to Tew.
