= USS Poinsett (1840) =

Gunboat of the United States Navy

History

United States
- Name: USS Poinsett
- Namesake: Joel Roberts Poinsett
- Acquired: by the U.S. Navy in 1840 from the U.S. War Department
- In service: circa 1840
- Out of service: August 1842
- Fate: returned to the War Department in 1845

General characteristics
- Type: gunboat
- Displacement: 250 tons
- Propulsion: steam engine, sidewheel-propelled
- Armament: Two guns

USS Poinsett was a gunboat acquired by the U.S. Navy from the U.S. War Department for use during the Second Seminole War. Post-war she performed survey duties before being returned to the War Department.

== Service history ==
The first ship to be so named by the Navy, Poinsett, a sidewheel gunboat, was transferred from the War Department to the Navy Department in 1839 by the Secretary of War, Joe Roberts Poinsett, for service in the 2nd Seminole War. Initially commanded by Comdr. Isaac Mayo who reported in a letter dated November 18th, 1839 to the Secretary of Navy that its engine was out of order and stated, "The Poinsett cannot be run upon this station but at a very heavy expense, she is useless on the east coast." and then wrote, "I conceive it to be my duty to recommend the withdrawal of the Poinsett from this station, and to relieve all officers attached to her, from service in Florida." On December 2nd, 1839 The Secretary of Navy wrote in a letter to the John T. McLaughlin that, "Commander Mayo has been ordered to return to the north with the Poinsett, and directed to leave his barges at Tea Table Key, for your use, should you require them."

The Poinsett was later employed against the Seminoles until August 1842 when a large percentage of the tribe was relocated in the west. Then assigned to survey activities, Poinsett remained in the waters off Florida, primarily in the Tampa area, until returned to the War Department in 1845.
