= Thomas Jones (Maryland judge) =

American judge (–1812)

Thomas Jones (March 12, 1735 – September 12, 1812) was a justice of the Maryland Court of Appeals from 1778 to 1806.

== Early life and career ==
Born in Baltimore, Maryland, Jones was the only surviving son of Philip Jones Jr., a commissioner of the peace and surveyor in that county, and Anne Rattenbury. Jones read law to gain admission to the bar on motion before the Baltimore County Court in March 1757, and was recorded as counsel of record in cases in that county. He did not regularly attended the courts at Annapolis, Maryland, but farmed a large tidewater plantation "on Patapsco Neck, in Baltimore". Jones was "the last Deputy Commissary of Baltimore County, for probate of wills and administration of estates, and when the Orphans Court system replaced the Prerogative Court and the commissaries, in 1777, he had become the first Register of Wills of Baltimore County".

== Judicial service ==
Jones was one of the first group of five judges appointed to the Maryland Court of Appeals by the Maryland General Assembly in October 1778, and commissioned by Governor Thomas Johnson Jr., on December 22, 1778.

Due to the circumstances of the ongoing American Revolutionary War, the court did not actually meet for several years after its institution. "The qualification of Judge Jones is not recorded in the minutes, but his attendance was noted for the first time on November 20, 1781". Even after the war, the work of the court was frequently interrupted or delayed, with Jones noting in an 1885 letter to his wife that there was little chance of the court being able to work that week.

In 1806, the state courts were restructured so that district court judges would also constitute the court of appeals, and Jones received an appointment to serve as a trial court judge in the Sixth District of Maryland. In 1810, an effort was made in the legislature to remove Jones from the bench due to alleged non-attendance to his duties, but the effort failed, and Jones "held a seat on the trial bench until his death in 1812". after which he was succeeded on the court by Theodorick Bland.

== Personal life and death ==
Jones married Elizabeth Baxter, daughter of James Baxter, sheriff of Cecil County, Maryland, and Elizabeth Waugh, with whom he had three sons and three daughters. Jones fell ill and died while visiting one of his daughters at Fort McHenry, Maryland, at the age of 77.

Political offices
Preceded by Newly established court	Judge of the Maryland Court of Appeals; 1778–1806	Succeeded by Theodorick Bland
