= William Cotter (pirate) =

Colonial American pirate (c. 1670–1702)

Pirate William Cotter
- Born: c. 1670; England (possibly)
- Died: 1702 (aged 31–32); Anne Arundel County, Maryland
- Occupations: Pirate and plantation owner
- Known for: Being a pirate and owning the Gresham Estate in Maryland
- Spouse: Jane Gassaway
- Children: 4
- Relatives: Nicholas Gassaway b.1634 d.1691 (father-in-law)
- Piratical career
- Allegiance: None
- Years active: 1690-1692
- Rank: Unknown
- Base of operations: Jamaica and the Red Sea
- Commands: Bachelors Delight (crewman only)

William Cotter (c. 1670 – 1702) was a former pirate who lived in Maryland in the late 17th century. He became notable due to his association with the Gresham Estate.

== Biography ==
William Cotter is believed to have been born in England around 1670. He was an active pirate from 1690 to 1692 and sailed under George Raynor, the captain of the Bachelor's Delight, described as a "man of war." Cotter sailed from Jamaica to the Red Sea for two years attacking ships before returning to the colonies.

In 1691, Cotter was sailing under Raynor when they arrived at Adam Baldridge's pirate trading post in Madagascar after they had attacked a Moorish ship. They resupplied there and renamed their ship the Loyal Jamaica. Cotter and Raynor shared the looted treasure and then headed to the Providence of South Carolina.

After arriving in South Carolina, Raynor's crew attacked a ship that belonged to plantation owner Jonathan Amory. Once in the colonies, Cotter migrated to Maryland where, in 1693, he married Jane Gassaway, the daughter of Nicholas Gassaway, a prominent colonial official.

Following the death of Nicholas Gassaway around 1692, Cotter inherited the Gresham estate. He renamed it "Cotter's Desire." The estate reverted to the name Gresham when it fell back into the hands of the Gresham family many years later.

In 1698, Cotter's past as a pirate was disclosed. He confessed to having sailed on a private man-of-war vessel under Raynor and was convicted of piracy in court. Cotter was described by the English Crown to "be of good behavior as to any acts of piracy." Nothing further came of this piracy conviction.

In 1702, Cotter died of natural causes. He left his estate to his four children.
