= All Hallows Church (South River, Maryland) =

Historic church in Maryland, United States

- All Hallows' Church
- U.S. National Register of Historic Places
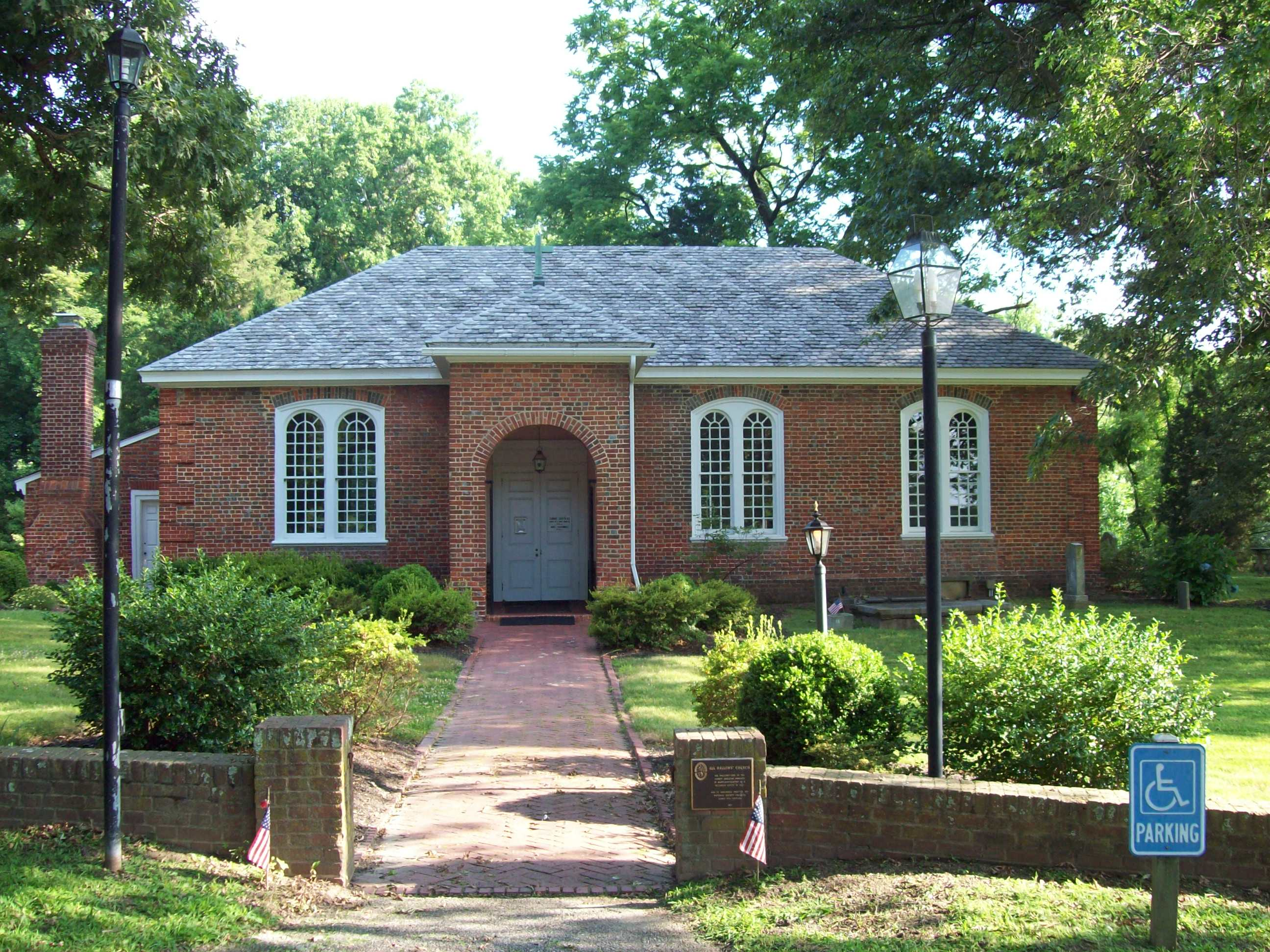
- All Hallows' Church, July 2009

- Location within Maryland Location within the United States
- Nearest city: Davidsonville, Maryland
- Coordinates: 38°54′38″N 76°34′52″W
- Built: 1710
- NRHP reference No.: 69000060
- Added to NRHP: May 15, 1969

All Hallows Church, also known as The Brick Church, is a historic church located at 3604 Solomon's Island Road, in Edgewater, Anne Arundel County, Maryland, United States. Parish records date back to 1682, indicating that it existed prior to the Act of Establishment (1692) passed by the General Assembly of Maryland laying off the Province into 30 Anglican parishes.

The church building is a low, rectangular Flemish bond brick structure with a hip roof. The building was constructed about 1710 as the parish church of All Hallows' or South River Parish, now called All Hallows Parish, South River. The interior was gutted by fire in 1727. It was modernized in 1825 and again in 1885. After a fire in 1940, reconstruction restored the building to its 1710 appearance.

The ancient cemetery, shaded by a grove of oak trees, surrounds the church. It contains the graves of many local families. One is Provincial Justice, Deputy-Governor and Lord High Sheriff of Anne Arundel Colonel William Burgess (1622–1686), who donated 100 acres of his lands for the establishment of Londontowne. Among the descendants of pioneer planter/politician Colonel Nicholas Gassaway is his son, the Lord High Sheriff Captain Thomas Gassaway (1683–1739), amidst whose plantations the church itself was built.

The bell in the rustic tower bears the date 1727.

All Hallows' Church was listed on the National Register of Historic Places in 1969.

In addition to the Brick Church, the parish maintains a chapel-of-ease at 864 West Central Avenue, in Davidsonville. The Chapel was constructed from 1860 to 1865 because the parish's Brick Church was too far away at 5 miles (8.0 km) distant. The parish's rectory is diagonally across the street from the Chapel.

All Hallows Parish, South River, is still an active parish in the Episcopal Diocese of Maryland. The Rev. Jeffrey C. Hual is the current rector.

== Gallery ==
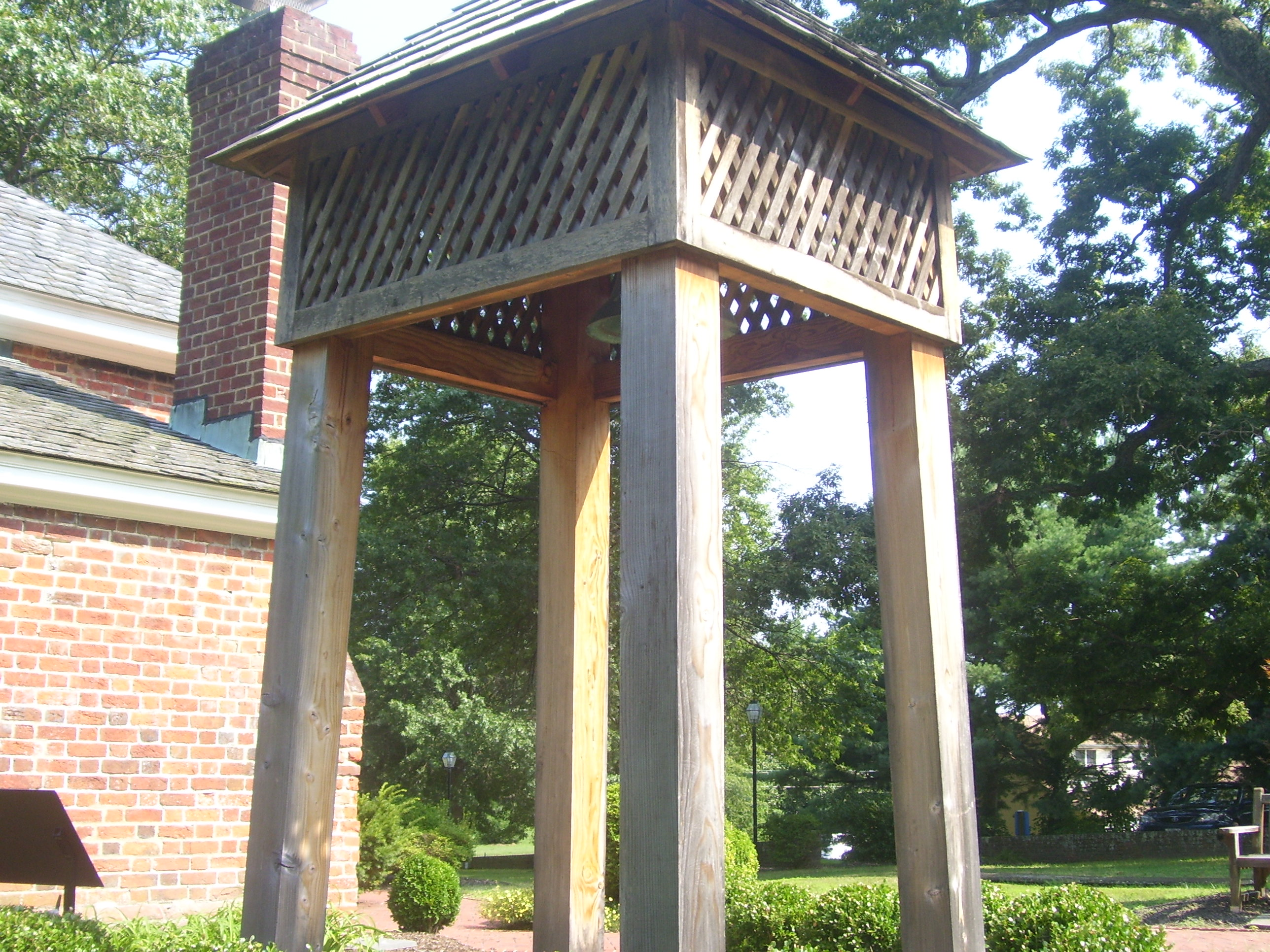
Bell Tower at All Hallow's Brick Church, Completed in Spring 2006 by C. R. Bennett Construction, September 2009
