= Gresham (Edgewater, Maryland) =

Historic house in Maryland, United States

- U.S. National Register of Historic Places
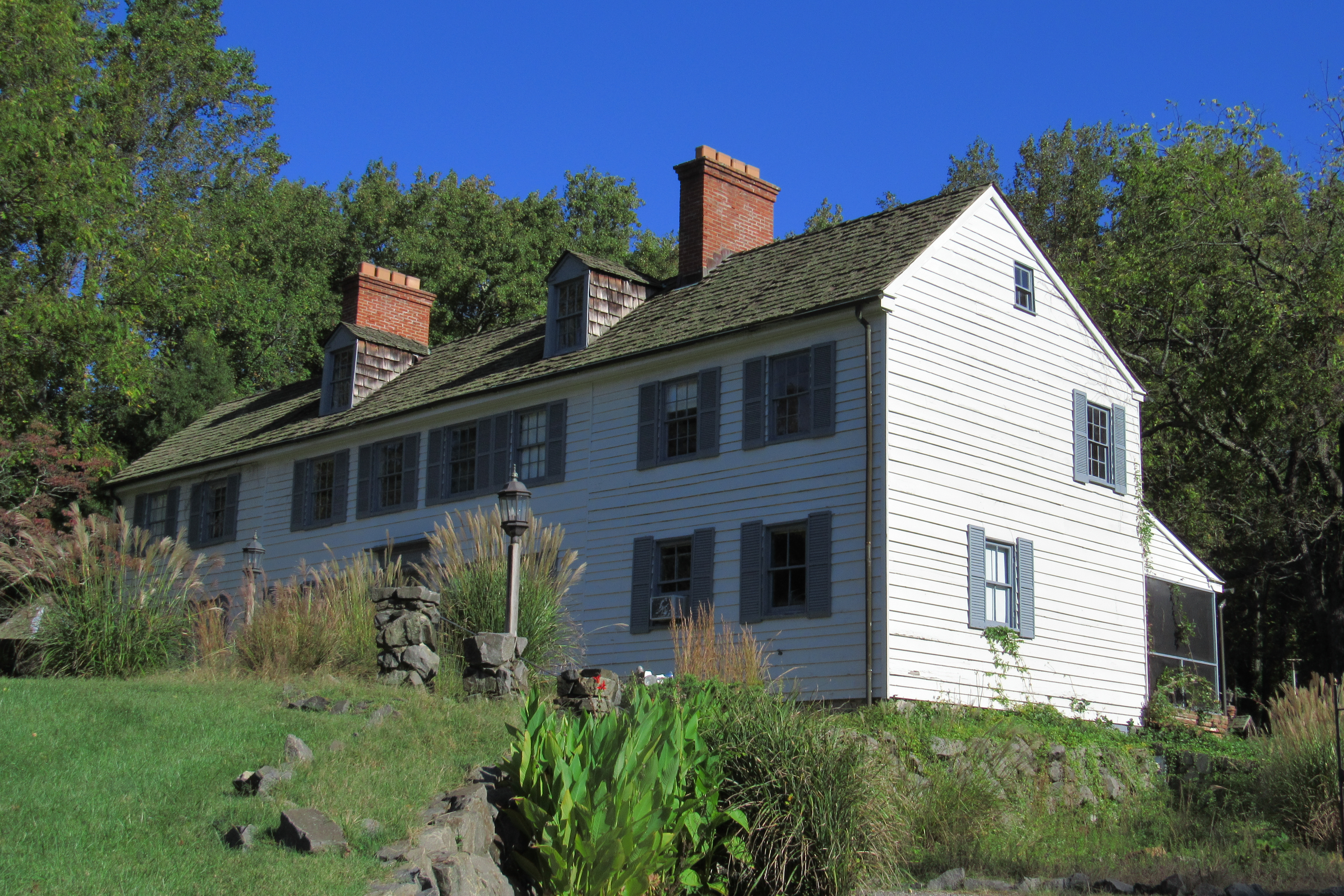
- Front view of Gresham House

- Location within Maryland Location within the United States
- Location: 784 Mayo Rd., Edgewater, Maryland
- Coordinates: 38°54′36″N 76°31′44″W
- Built: late 1700s
- Architectural style: Colonial Revival, Greek Revival
- NRHP reference No.: 84001342
- Added to NRHP: September 7, 1984

Gresham is a historic home near Edgewater, Maryland. It is a large 2 1/2-story frame dwelling built in the late 1700s.

John Gresham II lived at Gresham after 1686 on land owned by land-grant pioneer Captain Edward Selby.

After the Selby heirs suffered financial setbacks, the plantation was owned briefly by the pirate William Cotter and then by assorted members of Colonel Nicholas Gassaway's family (his daughter Jane having married Cotter), including the sons of Captain John Gassaway, Lord High Sheriff of Annapolis. The Gresham family continued to own the house on rented Gassaway land then known as Cotter's Desire. Gresham is most associated with Commodore Isaac Mayo, who received it from his uncle who had purchased the property and house from the Cotter/Gassaway heirs around 1765. He occupied the property beginning in the early 19th century until his controversial death there in 1861 at the dawn of the Civil war he openly opposed.

It was listed on the National Register of Historic Places in 1990.

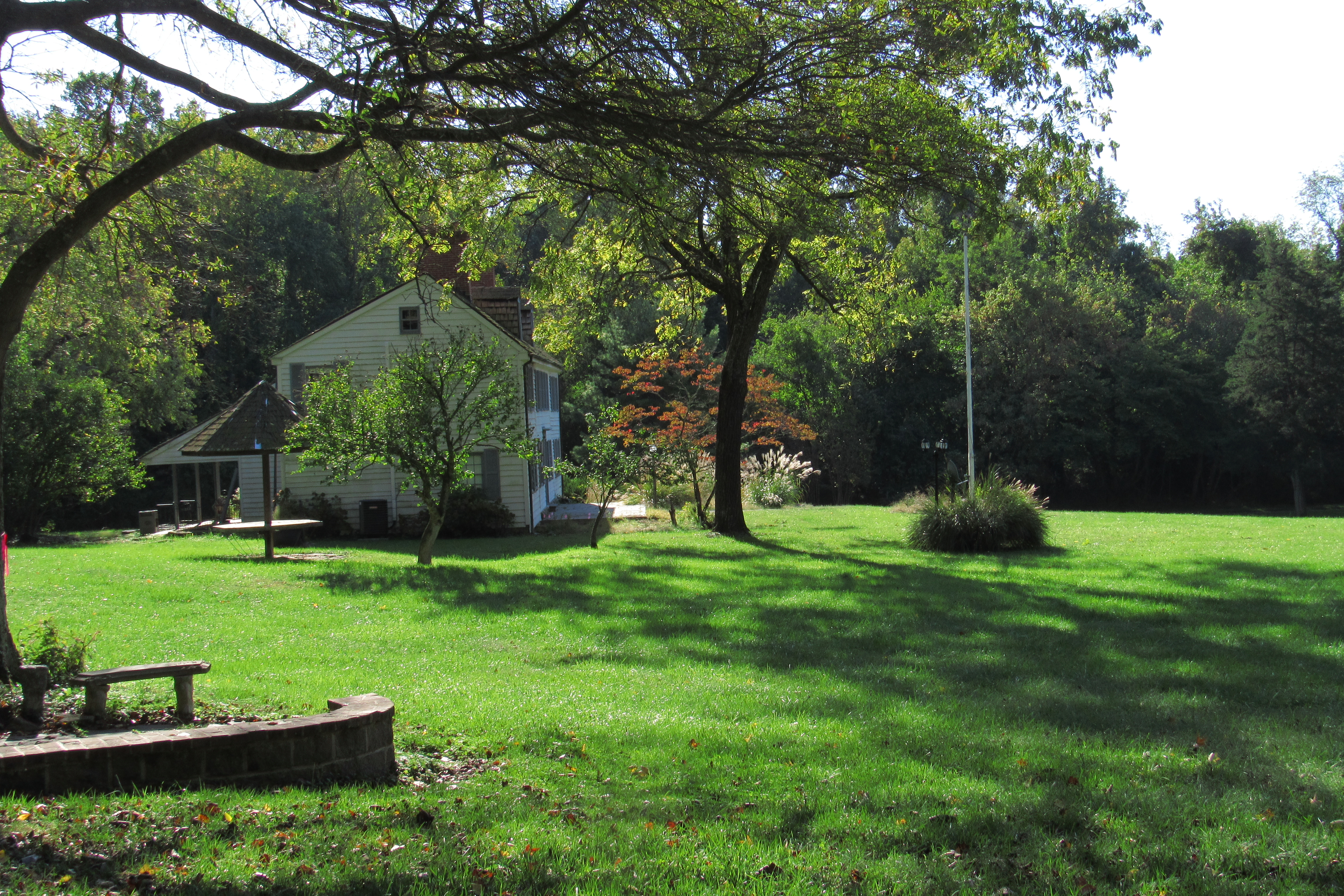
Gresham property

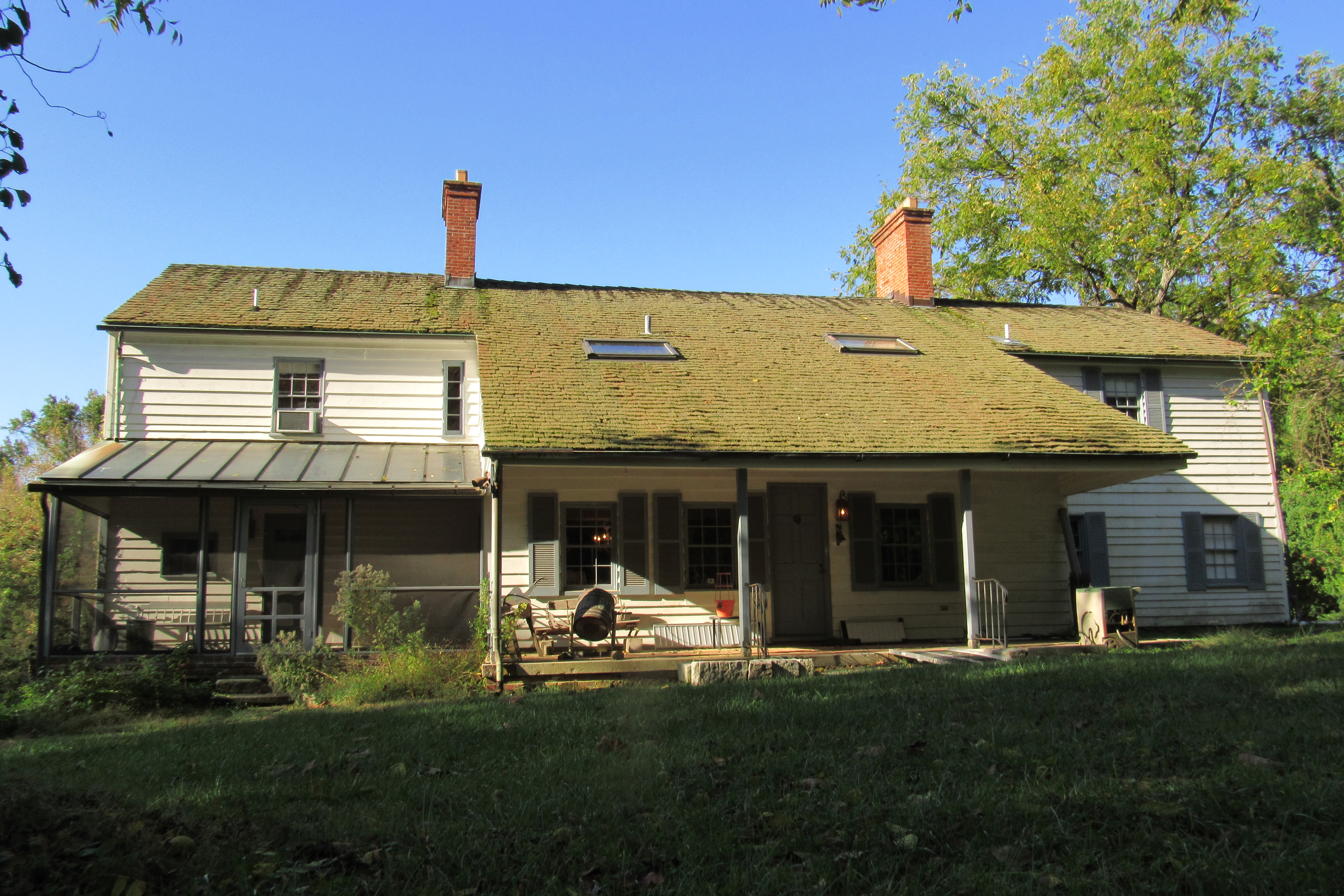
Rear view
