= John Johnson Jr. =

American judge (1798–1856)

6th Chancellor of Maryland
- In office 1846–1851
- Preceded by: Theodorick Bland
- Succeeded by: None

Personal details
- Born: 8 August 1798 Annapolis, Maryland
- Died: 4 October 1856 (aged 58)
- Spouse: Mary Tyler
- Parent(s): John Johnson Sr. Deborah Ghieselen
- Relatives: Reverdy Johnson (brother)
- Education: St. John's College

John Johnson Jr. (August 8, 1798 – October 4, 1856) was an American politician who was the last Chancellor of Maryland, serving in that office from to 1846 to 1851.

== Early life ==
Born in Annapolis, Maryland, Johnson was the son of John Johnson Sr. (a prominent attorney who also served as Chancellor of Maryland) and Deborah Johnson. His older brother was Reverdy Johnson (1796–1876), who married Mary Mackall Bowie (1801–1873), the sister of Thomas Fielder Bowie.

== Career ==
As a young man, he clerked in a mercantile house in Baltimore, and after attending St. John's College for short period, he decided in 1813 to move to New Orleans and embark on a career as a merchant. However, he was unsuccessful in business, and found that the southern climate taxed his health, and therefore decided to return to Maryland to enter the legal profession. He read law under the supervision of his brother, Reverdy, and was admitted to the bar in 1820 or 1821. He then practiced in Upper Marlborough, despite periodic health problems, until he was appointed Clerk of the Court of Appeals, in Annapolis, in 1829. He was well regarded in that office, from which he resigned in the fall of 1836 to return to practice, primarily before the Courts of Chancery and Appeals at Annapolis.

He was also elected to represent Anne Arundel County in the Maryland House of Delegates, during a period of financial crisis in the state. He was named Chairman of the Committee on Ways and Means, and was noted to have worked tirelessly to address the crisis. He was not reelected, and a subsequent candidacy for the State Senate also failed, leaving Johnson to return to his legal practice. Upon the death of Chancellor Bland in 1846, Johnson was appointed to succeed him as Chancellor of Maryland, despite reservations from friends and family about the effects that the work might have on Johnson's health. Johnson served in that office until it was abolished by adoption of the New Constitution of the State in 1851, thus making him the last of the Chancellors. Johnson returned to private practice for several more years until his death.

Throughout his legal career, Johnson maintained an interest in the welfare of St. John's college, advocating for it before the legislature and the public. He delivered at least one address to the alumni, and actively served on the board of visitors and governors.

== Personal life ==
Johnson was married to Mary Tyler (1804–1858). Together, they were the parents of several children, including:

- Mary Tyler Johnson (1833–1854)
- John Johnson III (1835–1912), who married Ellen Armistead Hemsley (1836–1904), a descendant of William Hemsley, in 1860.
- Flora Johnson Todd (1845-1933), the wife of Navy officer Henry D. Todd and mother of Army officer Henry D. Todd Jr.

In 1856, his health quickly deteriorated, leading to his death on October 4, 1856.
