= John Rogers (Continental Congress) =

American Founding Father, lawyer, and judge (1723–1789)

- Born: 1723
- Died: September 23, 1789 (aged 65–66); Annapolis, Maryland, U.S.
- Known for: Founding Father of the United States

John Rogers (1723 – September 23, 1789) was a Founding Father of the United States, who served as military officer in the American Revolutionary War, lawyer and judge from Upper Marlboro, Maryland. Rogers was a delegate for Maryland to the Continental Congress in 1775—1776, when he voted for the Declaration of Independence but became ill before he could sign it. Rogers also served as Chancellor of Maryland, a judicial office, from 1778 until his death 11 years later.

== Revolutionary career ==
Rogers was a member of the committee of safety in 1774 and 1775, and a member of the Maryland provincial conventions in 1774, 1775, and 1776, in addition to being a member of the Continental Congress. He was the "second major of battalion" for Prince George's County. In 1776 he was a judge of the court of admiralty. He was one of three Maryland delegates to the Congress who voted in July 1776, to declare America's independence from Great Britain and to approve the Declaration of Independence. Because of his subsequent illness, Rogers' signature does not appear on the actual Declaration document. He is the only delegate who voted for the Declaration, but did not sign it.

In 1777 Rogers was a member of the executive council on the organization of the state government and was elected as a United States Presidential elector from Maryland in 1788.

== Judicial career ==
From 1778 until his death Rogers was Chancellor of Maryland.

== Personal life ==
Rogers married Margaret Lee (Alice) Clarke, the daughter of Alice Lee (of the powerful Lee family of Virginia and Maryland) and stepdaughter of Continental Congressman Meriwether Smith. They had a daughter, Margaret, who married Walter Story Chandler of Charles County, Maryland, and lived in the Georgetown area of the District of Columbia. They had two sons and a daughter (Lucy). Although Walter S. Chandler Jr. graduated from the U.S. Military Academy in 1830, he died in 1835, but his brother William Chandler (1812-1892) survived the Civil War and ultimately died in New Jersey).

== Death and legacy ==
Rogers died in Annapolis in September, 1789, survived by his widow, who is buried in Annapolis. Although the site of his grave is unknown, a memorial marker honoring him is on the grounds of the Prince George's County administration building.
