= James Houston (judge) =

American judge (1767–1819)

Judge of the United States District Court for the District of Maryland
- In office April 21, 1806 – June 8, 1819
- Appointed by: Thomas Jefferson
- Preceded by: James Winchester
- Succeeded by: Theodorick Bland

Personal details
- Born: James Houston; October 10, 1767 Chestertown, Maryland
- Died: June 8, 1819 (aged 51) Chestertown, Maryland
- Education: read law

James Houston (October 10, 1767 – June 8, 1819) was a United States district judge of the United States District Court for the District of Maryland.

== Education ==
Born in Chestertown, Maryland, Houston read law to enter the bar in 1806.

== Federal judicial service ==
Houston was nominated by President Thomas Jefferson on April 19, 1806, to a seat on the United States District Court for the District of Maryland vacated by Judge James Winchester. Houston was confirmed by the United States Senate and received his commission, on April 21, 1806. He served until his death on June 8, 1819, in Chestertown.

== Sources ==
Legal offices
Preceded by James Winchester	Judge of the United States District Court for the District of Maryland; 1806—1819	Succeeded by Theodorick Bland
