= John Johnson Sr. =

American judge (1770–1824)

John Johnson

4th Chancellor of Maryland
- In office 1821–1824
- Preceded by: William Kilty
- Succeeded by: Theodorick Bland

5th Attorney General of Maryland
- In office 1806–1811
- Governor: Robert Wright; Edward Lloyd
- Preceded by: John Thomson Mason
- Succeeded by: John Montgomery

Personal details
- Born: 12 September 1770 Annapolis, Maryland
- Died: 30 July 1824 (aged 53) Hancock, Maryland
- Spouse: Deborah Ghiselen (m. 1794)
- Children: Reverdy Johnson; John Johnson Jr. George Johnson

John Johnson Sr. (September 12, 1770 – July 30, 1824) was an American attorney and judge who was the fourth Chancellor of Maryland from 1821 to 1824.

== Early life ==
Johnson was born in Annapolis, Maryland, on September 12, 1770. He was the son of Anne and Robert Johnson, who was said to have been a revolutionary officer, though this cannot be positively ascertained. The incidents of Johnson's early life "seem to be lost in obscurity".

== Career ==
He settled in Annapolis and there practiced his profession. He was appointed Attorney-General of Maryland on October 18, 1806, to succeed John Thomson Mason, his predecessors in that office having also included Luther Martin and William Pinkney. Chief Justice Roger B. Taney, in his Autobiography, mentions John Johnson along with Luther Martin, Philip Barton Key, John Thomson Mason, Arthur Scharff, James Winchester as a leader of the bar when he went to Annapolis to study law in the first decade of the last century. In other places he speaks of him with honor.

He was Attorney-General March 25, 1811, when he was appointed Judge of the Maryland Court of Appeals to fill a vacancy caused by the death of Judge Gantt. Johnson held this position for ten years, where he authored many well-regarded opinions. He was a Presidential Elector in 1816.

=== Chancellor of Maryland ===
Upon the death of William Kilty, Johnson was the sole candidate considered for the office of Chancellor of Maryland. He was immediately appointed and accepted. He was appointed to this position on October 15, 1821, but his term was comparatively short and few of his opinions are given in the reports of the Court of Appeals, most of the cases that went up on appeal containing the bare decree of the Chancellor below. He was one of the Boundary Commissioners to settle the dispute between Maryland and Virginia.

== Personal life ==
On January 9, 1794, he married Deborah (née Ghiselen) Johnson (1773–1847), the daughter of Reverdy Ghiselin. Together, they were the parents of:

- Reverdy Johnson (1796–1876), who married Mary Mackall Bowie (1801–1873), the sister of Thomas Fielder Bowie
- John Johnson Jr. (1798–1856) who would become the last Chancellor of Maryland.
- Mary Johnson (b. 1802)
- George Johnson (1817–1892), who married Henrietta E. Harwood (1819–1895)
- William Johnson

He died at Hancock, Maryland on July 30, 1824 of fever while in discharge of his duties in the western part of the State. At the time of his death, he owned a house in Annapolis and a farm in Prince George's County. His estate was valued at $4,174, and he owned 10 slaves.

Legal offices
Preceded by John Thomson Mason	Attorney General of Maryland; 1806–1811	Succeeded by John Montgomery
Preceded by John Mackall Gantt	Judge of the Maryland Court of Appeals; 1811–1821	Succeeded by John Stephen
