= William Kilty =

American judge

Chief Judge of the United States Circuit Court of the District of Columbia
- In office March 23, 1801 – January 26, 1806
- Appointed by: Thomas Jefferson
- Preceded by: position established
- Succeeded by: William Cranch

Chancellor of Maryland
- In office January 26, 1806 – October 10, 1821
- Appointed by: Robert Bowie
- Preceded by: Alexander Contee Hanson
- Succeeded by: John Johnson Sr.

Personal details
- Born: 1757 London, England
- Died: October 10, 1821 (aged 63–64) Annapolis, Maryland
- Education: College of St Omer; Read law

William Kilty (1757 – October 10, 1821) was an American lawyer who was the Chief Judge of the United States Circuit Court of the District of Columbia from 1801 to 1806 and the 3rd Chancellor of Maryland from 1806 to 1821. He served as a surgeon during the American Revolutionary War. As Chancellor of Maryland, he wrote an influential summary of the British Statutes still in force in Maryland, and served on a committee established to address a British blockade of American vessels.

== Education and military career ==
Born in 1757, in London, England, Kilty emigrated to the Maryland colony with at least his Scottish-born father John Kilty (1730-1785) and brother John Kilty Jr. (1751-1811). He studied medicine under Edward Johnson of Annapolis.

During the American Revolutionary War, Kilty served in the 5th Maryland Regiment as a surgeon's mate from April 1778 to April 1780, when he was promoted to the regimental surgeon. His elder brother John Kilty was Captain of Dragoons in the Maryland Line of the Continental Army (and later Brigadier General of the Maryland militia). Taken prisoner at the Battle of Camden, Kilty returned to Annapolis in the spring of 1781. He served until 1783 and was admitted as an original member of The Society of the Cincinnati in the state of Maryland when it was established near the end of that year. Kilty sailed to France where he received a degree from the College of St. Omer, then returned to Maryland and read law.

== Legal career ==
After admission to the Maryland bar, Kilty had a private legal practice. He also wrote several essays condemning the anarchic state of affairs under the Articles of Confederation, which governed until the ratification of the Constitution of the United States in 1787. He was appointed compiler of the laws of Maryland from 1798 to 1800. He published the two volumes known as "Kilty's Laws", then moved to the new federal city (established in 1790), and settled in Washington, D.C., in 1800.

== Federal judicial service ==
Shortly after taking office, President Thomas Jefferson on March 23, 1801, offered Kilty a recess appointment to the new Chief Judge seat on the United States Circuit Court of the District of Columbia authorized by the controversial Judiciary Act of 1801, 2 Stat. 103. President Jefferson formally nominated Chief Judge Kilty to the same seat on January 6, 1802. The United States Senate confirmed the appointment on January 26, 1802, and Kilty received his commission the same day. On January 27, 1806, Kilty resigned to become Chancellor of Maryland as discussed below.

== Chancellor of Maryland ==
When Chancellor Alexander Contee Hanson died in office, the Governor of Maryland, Robert Bowie had first offered the position as Chancellor of Maryland to Gabriel Duvall (then serving as the federal Comptroller of the Treasury), who declined, and then to Robert Smith (the acting Attorney General of the United States), who also declined. Gov. Bowie then appointed Kilty, and he accepted, taking his seat on January 26, 1806.

His opinions as Chancellor were noted to be "generally very concise, not laden with citations of authorities like Bland's, but showing close familiarity with English equity jurisprudence". His most important work as Chancellor was his 1811 report on the British Statutes in force in Maryland. The work received high commendation from the Court of Appeals and the profession generally, but the Assembly took no action on his report other than ordering the printing of one thousand copies. In Dashiell vs. Attorney-General, 5 H. & J., 403, the court said that "the book was compiled, printed and distributed under the sanction of the State for the use of its officers and is a safe guide in exploring an otherwise very dubious path". Kilty also undertook other public activities during his Chancellorship. In 1807, he was appointed to a committee of prominent citizens to address a British blockade of American vessels; and in January 1808 he assisted in drafting a resolution further condemning British actions against U.S. shipping.

Kilty held that office until his death on October 10, 1821, in Annapolis. A memorial was held on October 11, 1821, in the Baltimore County Court, and the National Intelligencer for October 17, 1821, reported an account of the action of the Bar of the District of Columbia on the death of Kilty.

This morning, shortly after the meeting of the court, Colonel Ashton, a member of the bar, stated to the court that the death of William Kilty, late Chancellor of Maryland, had just been announced to the public; that penetrated with deep regret himself at the loss of a citizen and officer of such distinguished talents and such eminent virtues and usefulness, he could not forbear to hope that this court, of which Chancellor Kilty had been formerly the chief judge, and this bar, which could bear such ample testimony to his work and excellence, would not deem it out of place to show, by some public act, their general sorrow for the melancholy event, and their high respect for the memory of the deceased. The court, upon the motion being seconded by Mr. Swann, the District Attorney, and carried, adjourned. It was resolved that the members of the bar of the court wear crape on their left arm for a month.

== Personal life ==
Kilty married Elizabeth Middleton (1757-1807) In 1790, Kilty lived with her and a slave in Prince George's County, Maryland. In the 1810 federal census, Chancellor Kilty's Annapolis household included three slaves. The following year his brother died, and that widow petitioned to receive his Revolutionary War pension.

== Death and legacy ==
Kilty died in Annapolis, Maryland, on October 10, 1821, and, like his brother Capt. John Kilty, is buried at historic St. Anne's Church there. John Johnson Sr. succeeded him as Chancellor. His former house at 133 Charles Street in Annapolis was photographed in the Historic American Buildings Survey.

== Sources ==
- William J. Marbury, "The High Court of Chancery and the Chancellors of Maryland", Report of the Tenth Annual Meeting of the Maryland State Bar Association, (1905), p. 137-155.

Legal offices
| Preceded by Seat established by 2 Stat. 103 | Chief Judge of the United States Circuit Court of the District of Columbia; 1801–1806 | Succeeded by William Cranch |
