= Nicholas Gassaway =

Colonel, Maryland Provincial Forces (1634–1691)

Member of the Committee of the Twenty
- In office < 1690 – 1691
- Constituency: Maryland Colony

Gentleman Justice of the Quorum, later Justice of the (Maryland) Provincial Court

Commissioner of Londontown, Commissioner of the Peace, & Colonel, Maryland Provincial Forces
- Incumbent
- Assumed office 1683 & 1686

Personal details
- Born: 1634 London, England
- Died: 1691 (aged 56–57) Anne Arundel, Maryland
- Spouse: Anne Besson
- Relations: Ancestor of Henry G. Davis
- Children: Ann Gassaway Watkins (2nd Burgess, 3rd Jones), Captain Nicholas Gassaway, Captain John Gassaway, Jane Gassaway Cotter (2nd Sanders), Lord Sheriff Captain Thomas Gassaway, Margaret Gassaway Larkin, and Hester Gassaway Groce (2nd Warman)
- Occupation: Plantation owner, provincial military officer, justice and politician

Colonel Nicholas Gassaway (baptized 11 March 1634 – between 10 and 27 January 1691 Julian Calendar) was a colonial military and political leader and justice in early Maryland. He is the progenitor of the some five and a half thousand Americans who bear the family name in the 2000 census.

== Family name ==
Col. Gassaway is also notable for having settled on "Gassaway" as the family name (also spelled Gasaway, Gasway and Gazaway), a variant of his father Thomas Gaswaie’s family name. The "Gassaway" spelling had already appeared sporadically in England, as in a baptismal record of 1620, and Nicholas's own baptismal record, in the registers of St. Margaret's, Westminster, has "Gasway." Several spellings are used in the records for his siblings. Mary (1622) and Thomas (1628) have "Gaswaie"; Joyce (1626) has "Gasway"; Jane (1636) and Anne (1639) have "Gassaway"; but when Ann dies as a young child, in 1632, her burial record has "Gaswaie.". Sister Hester's baptismal record (1642) has "Gassoway", while a second Anne, baptized in 1644, has "Gaseaway."

== Career ==
Nicholas Gaswaie was born to a Welsh merchant family belonging to St. Margaret's Parish Westminster in London England. He emigrated to the colony as a professional plantation manager around 1650 and settled south of Londontowne, a southerly district of Annapolis, Maryland, today. Within a decade he was the owner of a sizable tobacco plantation exporting to his Gaswaie family back in England from his dock at the neck of the South River on Chesapeake Bay. He served as an officer in the Maryland Provincial military quickly rising to the rank of major during skirmishes with local Indigenous peoples. He died one of the largest landholders in the Maryland colony.

Nicholas Gassaway was a politician and jurist in addition to his military role in the colony. He was named a Gentleman Justice of the Quorum while still a Major. He was promoted to colonel in 1672 and was named as a Commissioner of Londontowne in 1683. He became a Commissioner of the Peace in 1686 and was appointed one of the Committee of Twenty who governed the Maryland Colony pending the arrival of a Royal Governor from late 1689 to 1691. Additionally, he sat as a Justice of the Provincial Court in his final years.

Nicholas’ son Captain Thomas Gassaway, who provided Gassaway land for the Old South River Club and All Hallows Church, would carry on the family tradition of both military and civilian leadership serving as Lord High Sheriff for Anne Arundel County from 1711 through 1714. His son, Captain John Gassaway, in turn served as High Sheriff of Annapolis.

== Family ==
Colonel Nicholas Gassaway was baptized Nicholas Gaswaie at St. Margaret’s Parish Westminster, London, England, 11 March 1634. He was the son of Thomas Gaswaie and Ann Collingwood, who were married there 6 January 1631. He emigrated to North America arriving around 1650.

Nicholas Gassaway married the daughter of Captain Thomas Besson, Anne. She was transported into Maryland by her father Thomas Besson in 1649. Nicholas Gassaway had 7 children including Captain Nicholas (1668–1699), Ann (1670–1742), Hester (1672 – < 1735), John (1674–1697), Jane (1678–1736), Margaret (1680–1724), and Captain Thomas (1683–1739). All of those holding rank followed Colonel Nicholas as officers in the Maryland Provincial Forces.

Three of Colonel Nicholas Gassaway’s great-grandchildren continued the tradition of colonial military service as officers in the Maryland Line of the Continental Army. They were Lieutenant Henry Gassaway, Lieutenant Nicholas Gassaway and Captain John Gassaway. Great-great grandson Colonel Gassaway Watkins of Daniel Morgan’s riflemen also gained distinction in the revolution and served as President of the Maryland chapter of the prestigious Society of the Cincinnati in which the most direct descendant of each of the four is eligible for membership.

One of many notable descendants of Colonel Nicholas Gassaway is Henry Gassaway Davis, a railroad tycoon from West Virginia who served as Senator from that state (1871–83) and ran for Vice President of the United States in 1904. The town of Gassaway, West Virginia is named after the late Senator.

Another is the sculptor Rudulph Evans.

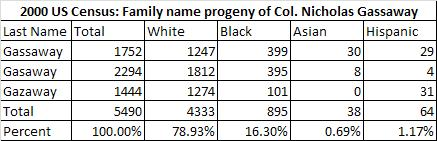

As of the Census of 2000, there were 5599 persons in the United States named Gassaway, Gasaway, Gasway or Gazaway. Of those roughly 79% were identified as white, 16% African-American, 1% Hispanic and less than 1% Asian-American.

== Burial mystery ==
Colonel Nicholas Gassaway owned large tracts of land alongside Chesapeake Bay south of modern Annapolis, Maryland. His lands abutted those of the Selby family, Called Selby's Marsh, a part of which was rented to family attorney John Gresham II who built what became known as Gresham house. In 1690, Nicholas’ daughter Jane married the pirate William Cotter who came to own part of Selby's Marsh in 1693 including the rental parcel, but it was not in the hands of any of Nicholas’ family at the time of his late 1691 death. Their plantation, renamed "Cotter's Desire", passed to their nephew Captain John's three sons and was later sold along with Gresham house to the family of Commodore Isaac Mayo, for whom much of the area is today named. Colonel Nicholas left to his son Captain Nicholas the Love's Neck plantation and his residence there in 1691. Gresham house was owned by Greshams on rented land until sometime after 1723. The wife of Mayo's grandson Thomas Gaither Jr. relocated the gravestone of Captain Nicholas Gassaway (died 1699), found at Gresham house, to St. Anne's sometime before the house passed out of the Mayo family in 1915. In the 1960s, it was discovered that a footstep at Gresham was in fact the downturned grave marker of Colonel Nicholas Gassaway and it too was relocated to St. Anne’s Church in Annapolis. How Colonel Nicholas’ and his son's gravestones came to be at Gresham house and where their remains actually lie is a mystery.
