= James Winchester (Maryland judge) =

American judge (1772–1806)

Judge of the United States District Court for the District of Maryland
- In office October 31, 1799 – April 5, 1806
- Appointed by: John Adams
- Preceded by: William Paca
- Succeeded by: James Houston

Personal details
- Born: James Winchester; September 13, 1772 Shawan, Province of Maryland, British America
- Died: April 5, 1806 (aged 33) Shawan, Maryland

James Winchester (September 13, 1772 – April 5, 1806) was a United States district judge of the United States District Court for the District of Maryland.

== Education and career ==
Born on September 13, 1772, in Shawan, Province of Maryland, British America, Winchester was a member of the Maryland House of Delegates from 1794 to 1796. He was the Federalist nominee for the 5th congressional district in 1798, losing to Democratic-Republican incumbent Samuel Smith.

== Federal judicial service ==
Winchester received a recess appointment from President John Adams on October 31, 1799, to a seat on the United States District Court for the District of Maryland vacated by Judge William Paca. He was nominated to the same position by President Adams on December 5, 1799. He was confirmed by the United States Senate on December 10, 1799, and received his commission the same day. His service terminated on April 5, 1806, due to his death in Shawan, Maryland.

== Sources ==
Legal offices
Preceded by William Paca	Judge of the United States District Court for the District of Maryland; 1799–1806	Succeeded by James Houston
