= Reverdy Johnson =

American politician (1796–1876)

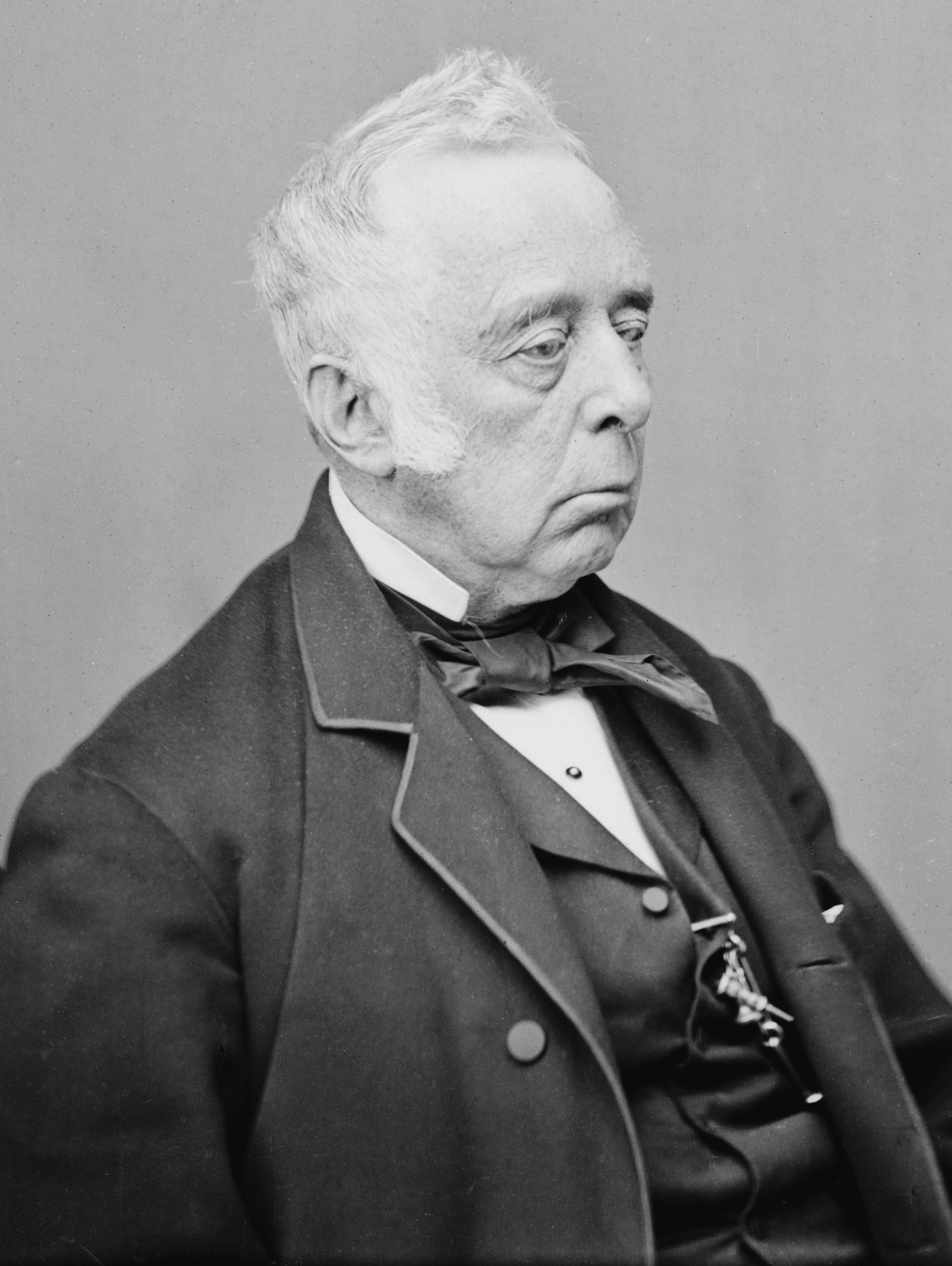
- Johnson c. 1855–1865

23rd United States Minister to the United Kingdom
- In office September 14, 1868 – May 13, 1869
- President: Andrew Johnson; Ulysses S. Grant
- Preceded by: Charles Adams
- Succeeded by: John Motley

Member of the Maryland House of Delegates
- In office 1861–1862

United States Senator from Maryland
- In office March 4, 1863 – July 10, 1868
- Preceded by: Anthony Kennedy
- Succeeded by: William Whyte
- In office March 4, 1845 – March 7, 1849
- Preceded by: William Merrick
- Succeeded by: David Stewart

21st United States Attorney General
- In office March 8, 1849 – July 21, 1850
- President: Zachary Taylor; Millard Fillmore
- Preceded by: Isaac Toucey
- Succeeded by: John J. Crittenden

Member of the Maryland State Senate
- In office 1821–1825

Chief Commissioner of Insolvent Debtors in Maryland
- In office 1817

Deputy Attorney General of Maryland
- In office 1816–1817
- Governor: Levin Winder; Charles Carnan Ridgely

Personal details
- Born: May 21, 1796 Annapolis, Maryland, U.S.
- Died: February 10, 1876 (aged 79) Annapolis, Maryland, U.S.
- Resting place: Green Mount Cemetery
- Party: Whig (before 1860); Democratic (1860–1872)
- Spouse: Mary Mackall Bowie (m. 1819; died 1871)
- Children: 15
- Parent: John Johnson (father)
- Relatives: John Johnson Jr. (brother)
- Education: St. John's College, Maryland (BA)

Military service
- Branch/service: Maryland Militia
- Years of service: 1814
- Rank: Private
- Unit: 22nd Maryland Regiment; 36th Maryland Regiment
- Battles/wars: War of 1812; Battle of Bladensburg

Reverdy Johnson (May 21, 1796 – February 10, 1876) was an American politician, statesman, and jurist from Annapolis, Maryland. He gained fame as a defense attorney, defending notables such as Sandford of the Dred Scott case, Maj. Gen. Fitz John Porter at his courts-martial, and Mary Surratt, conspirator in the assassination of Abraham Lincoln. A former Whig, he was a strong supporter of the Union war effort. At first he opposed wartime efforts to abolish slavery until 1864, and in 1865 supported the 13th Amendment banning slavery.

Johnson served as United States Minister to the United Kingdom from 1868 to 1869.

== Early life ==
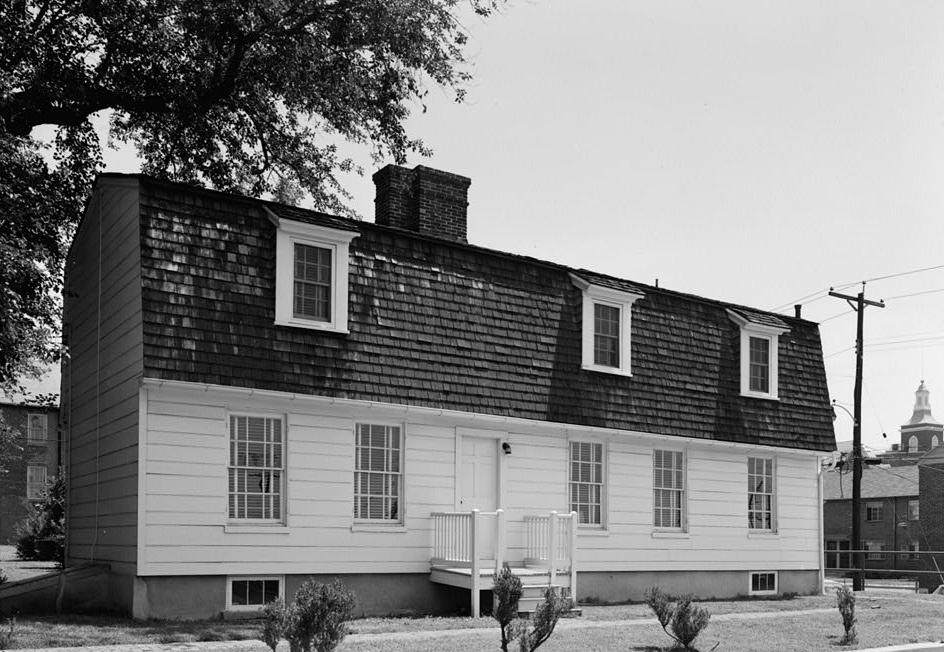
Reverdy Johnson's house in Annapolis, Maryland, relocated onto the campus of St. John's College.

Johnson was born on May 21, 1796, in Annapolis, Maryland. He was the son of a distinguished Maryland lawyer and politician, John Johnson (1770–1824), who served as Attorney General of Maryland from 1806 to 1811 and later Chancellor of Maryland, and Deborah (née Ghieselen) Johnson (1773–1847). His younger brothers were John Johnson Jr. (1798–1856), the last Chancellor of Maryland, and George Johnson (1817–1892).

He graduated from St. John's College in 1812 and then studied law. He was admitted to the bar in 1815. In August 1814, he served as a private in Ens. William Brewer's detachment of the 36th Maryland Militia, fighting at the Battle of Bladensburg.

== Career ==
In 1816, he was appointed as Deputy Attorney General of Maryland, a position he held until 1817. In 1817, Johnson moved to Baltimore, where he became a legal colleague of Luther Martin, William Pinkney and Roger B. Taney, the Attorney General and later Chief Justice of the United States from 1835 until 1864. He was appointed chief commissioner of insolvent debtors of Maryland in 1817. From 1821 until 1825 he served in the Maryland State Senate and then returned to practice law for two decades.

In 1842, while helping North Carolina Congressman Edward Stanly to ready himself for a duel with Virginia Congressman Henry Wise, Johnson fired a pistol at a tree, from which the ball rebounded and hit Johnson's left eye, blinding that eye and triggering the gradual onset of a sympathetic deterioration of the other eye that worsened over the rest of his life, eventually leaving him almost completely blind.

=== Federal politics ===
From 1845 to 1849, Johnson represented Maryland in the United States Senate as a Whig.

From his confirmation by the Senate in March 1849 until July 1850, Johnson was Attorney General of the United States under President Zachary Taylor. He resigned on July 21, 1850, shortly after Millard Fillmore took office on July 9, 1850.

While U.S. Attorney General, he was allowed to help Virginians Charles W. Russell and Alexander H. H. Stuart defend the Wheeling Suspension Bridge in his private capacity, that bridge also connecting two sections of the National Road as the first bridge crossing a major river west of the Appalachian Mountains. Although the plaintiffs technically won twice based on their argument that the bridge obstructed a navigable river, the bridge was never demolished (only repaired after wind damage) and further bridges were then constructed, including one over the Mississippi River at Rock Island in 1856.(which also led to litigation).

In November 1856, a large crowd, armed with guns and clubs, burned an effigy of Johnson on the railing of the Battle Monument in front of his house to protest a speech he made in New York against President Fillmore.

A conservative Democrat, Johnson supported Stephen A. Douglas in the presidential election of 1860. He represented the slave-owning defendant in the controversial 1857 case Dred Scott v. Sandford. However, Johnson was personally opposed to slavery and became a key figure in the effort to keep Maryland from seceding from the Union during the American Civil War.

He served as a Maryland delegate to the Peace Convention of 1861 and from 1861 to 1862 served in the Maryland House of Delegates. During this time he represented Maj. Gen. Fitz John Porter at his court-martial, arguing that Porter's distinguished record of service ought to put him beyond question. The officers on the court-martial, all handpicked by Secretary of War Edwin Stanton, voted to convict Porter of cowardice and disobedience.

After the capture of New Orleans, President Abraham Lincoln commissioned Johnson to revise the decisions of the military commandant, General Benjamin F. Butler, in regard to foreign governments, and reversed all those decisions to the entire satisfaction of the administration. After the war, reflecting the diverse points of view held by his fellow statesmen, Johnson argued for a gentler Reconstruction effort than that advocated by the Radical Republicans.

=== Return to the U.S. Senate ===
In 1863, he again took a seat in the United States Senate, serving through 1868. "The antislavery amendment caught Johnson's eye, however, because it offered an indisputable constitutional solution to the problem of slavery." In 1864, in a speech on the Senate floor, Johnson "cut loose from all Pro-Slavery associations by a bold declaration of strongest Anti Slavery sentiments", speaking in favor of the immediate and universal emancipation, and advocated the proposed amendment to the Constitution forever prohibiting slavery in the United States.

In 1865, he defended Mary Surratt before a military tribunal. Surratt was convicted and executed for plotting and aiding Lincoln's assassination. In 1866, he was a delegate to the National Union Convention which attempted to build support for President Johnson. Senator Johnson's report on the proceedings of the convention was entered into the record of President Johnson's impeachment trial. In the Senate, he also served on the Joint Committee on Reconstruction which drafted the Fourteenth Amendment to the United States Constitution, but he voted against passage of the amendment.

In 1866, he addressed the Senate regarding the appointment of provisional governors in the Southern States. In 1867, Johnson voted for the Reconstruction Act of 1867, the only Democrat to vote for a Reconstruction measure in 1866 or 1867.

=== Ambassador to the United Kingdom ===
On June 12, 1868, he was appointed minister to the United Kingdom, beginning his term on September 14, 1868. While in England, he was criticized for fraternizing with the Lairds, Wharncliffes, Roebucks, and Gregorios, of England, which was considered a blunder in diplomacy.

Soon after his arrival in England negotiated the Johnson-Clarendon Treaty for the settlement of disputes arising out of the Civil War, including the Alabama Claims. The Senate, however, refused to advise and consent to ratification, and he returned home on the accession of General Ulysses S. Grant to the presidency.

=== Later career ===
Again resuming his legal practice, he defended Ku Klux Klan members against indictments brought under the Ku Klux Klan Act of 1871.

Even though out of office, Johnson continued to offer his opinion on public matters. In December 1874, he wrote to The New York Times, stating that he hoped that after the next Presidential Election, "the General Government will thereafter be brought back into the part of the Constitution, that the limits of its powers will be maintained, that the reserved authority of the States will be recognized, and that the rights of its citizens will be faithfully preserved." In December 1875, he wrote a letter to the Baltimore Sun discussing the potential impact of England's purchase of a controlling interest in the Suez Canal.

In early 1876, Johnson was in Annapolis arguing the case of Baker v. Frick in the Court of Appeals and was a guest at the Maryland Governor's Mansion. On February 10, during a dinner party at the mansion, he fell near a basement door, possibly after tripping, and was killed instantly after hitting his head on a sharp corner of the mansion's granite base course and then again on the cobblestone pavement. He was the last surviving member of Taylor's cabinet. Upon Johnson's death, the Supreme Court Bar unanimously issued a statement that praised Johnson for his contributions to the Court, and expressed their condolences for his sudden passing.

== Personal life ==
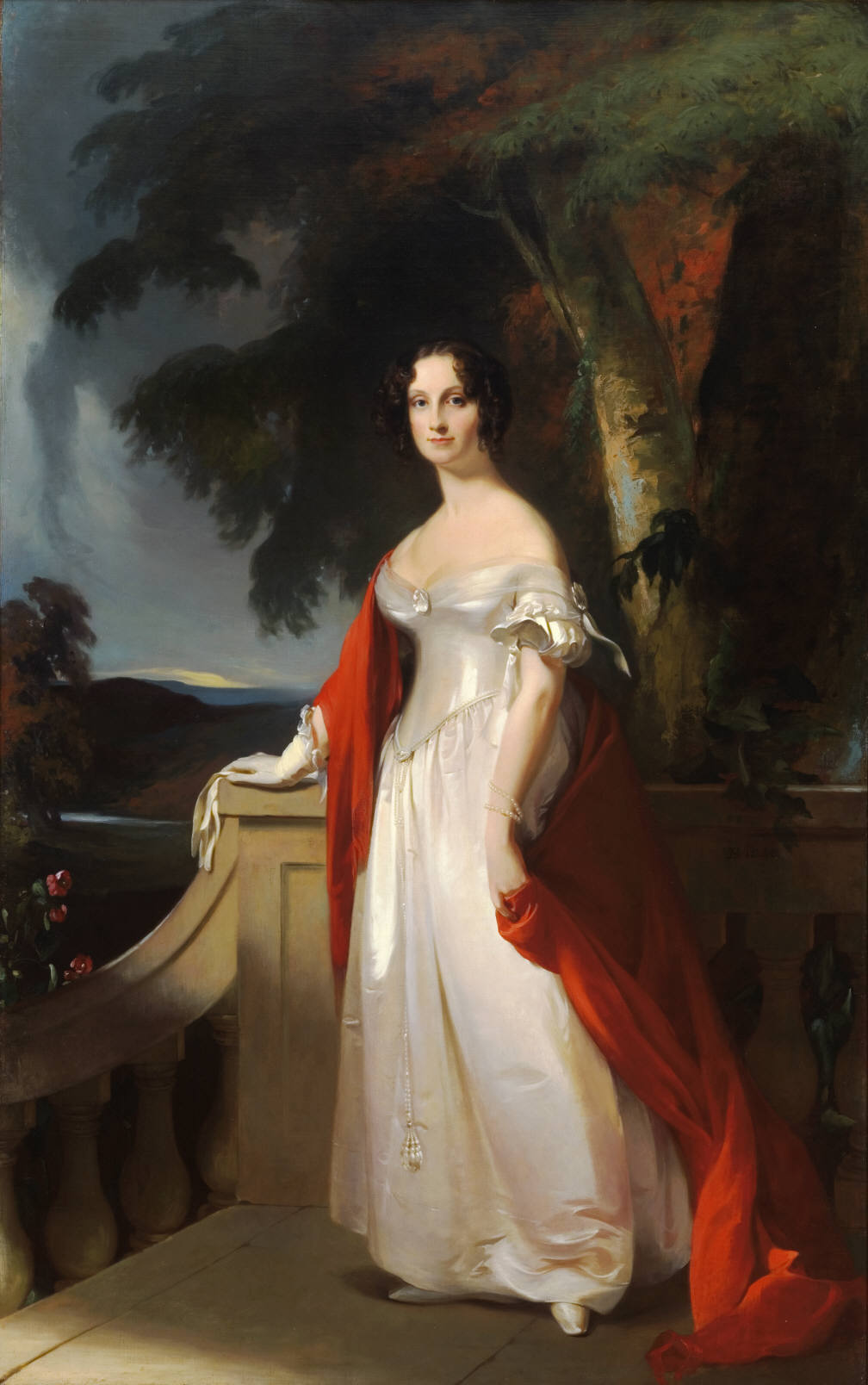
Mrs. Reverdy Johnson by Thomas Sully, ca. 1840, Princeton University Art Museum

On November 16, 1819, Johnson married Mary Mackall Bowie (1801–1873), the sister of Rep. Thomas Fielder Bowie and the daughter of Thomas Contee Bowie (1771–1813) and Mary Mackall (née Bowie) Wootton (1776–1825), who were third cousins. Her mother was the widow of Turnor Wootton (d. 1797), whom she married in 1794 and had one child with, William Turner Wootton, and was the daughter of Maryland Gov. Robert Bowie (1750–1818). Together, Reverdy and Mary had 15 children, of which five daughters and three sons survived, including:

- Mary Johnson (1822–1915), who married Thomas Hollingsworth Morris (1817–1872), the son of John Boucher Morris (1785–1874)
  - Mary Johnson Morris and Thomas Hollingsworth Morris had the daughter Lydia Hollingsworth Morris (1857–1936) who married Hollins McKim (1825–1911). Their daughter Mary Camilla McKim married Huntington Williams MD.
- Eliza Ridgely Johnson (1823–1897), who married Henry Daingerfield (d. 1866), the son of William H. Daingerfield (1808–1878)
- Reverdy Johnson Jr. (1826–1907), who married Caroline Patterson (1828–1863)
- Maria Louisa Johnson (1827–1893), who married William Riggin Travers (1819–1887)
- Matilda Elizabeth Bowie Johnson (1829–1911), who married Charles John Morris Gwinn (1822–1894), the Attorney General of Maryland
- Emily Contee Johnson (1832–1909), who married George Washington Lewis (1829–1885), brother of Edward Lewis (1837–1892) and grandson of Lawrence Lewis (1767–1839)
- Louis E Johnson (1837–1905), who married Marie May Bostick (1856–1942). He was the United States Marshal of South Carolina.
- Edward Contee Johnson (1843–1905), who married Kate Moore (1871–1922)

After his death on February 10, 1876, Johnson was buried at the Green Mount Cemetery in Baltimore, MD. Johnson had been the last surviving member of the Taylor Cabinet.

== In popular culture ==
In the 2011 film The Conspirator, Johnson is portrayed by actor Tom Wilkinson.

== See also ==
- Baltimore bank riot
- James Nesmith
- Thirteenth Amendment to the United States Constitution

== Notes ==
Notes

== Writings ==
- Johnson, Reverdy, The Dangerous Conditions of the Country, the Causes Which Have Led to It, and the Duty of the People (Baltimore; The Sun Printing Establishment, 1867)
- Johnson, Reverdy, A Further Consideration of the Dangerous Conditions of the Country, the Causes Which Have Led to It, and the Duty of the People (Baltimore; The Sun Printing Establishment, 1867)

U.S. Senate
Preceded by William D. Merrick	U.S. senator (Class 1) from Maryland; March 4, 1845 – March 7, 1849; Served alongside: James A. Pearce	Succeeded by David Stewart
Preceded by Anthony Kennedy	U.S. senator (Class 1) from Maryland; March 4, 1863 – July 10, 1868; Served alongside: Thomas Holliday Hicks, John A. J. Creswell and George Vickers	Succeeded by William Pinkney Whyte
Legal offices
Preceded by Isaac Toucey	U.S. Attorney General; Served under: Zachary Taylor, Millard Fillmore; March 8, 1849 – July 21, 1850	Succeeded by John J. Crittenden
Diplomatic posts
Preceded by Charles Francis Adams Sr.	U.S. Minister to Great Britain; 1868–1869	Succeeded by John Lothrop Motley
