= Chancellor of Maryland =

Former government position in the US state

The Chancellor of Maryland was the highest judicial office in the state of Maryland from before the American Revolution until the state's High Court of Chancery ceased to exist, on June 4, 1854.

The High Court of Chancery of Maryland was organized around the time of the American Revolution to take the place of its prototype, the High Court of Chancery of England. During the colonial period, Charles I of England had granted Cecil Calvert, 2nd Baron Baltimore, the authority to establish judicial tribunals in the Province of Maryland. Calvert appointed his brother, Leonard Calvert, to this office. Leonard Calvert's successors were appointed by the Lords Proprietary, and exercised powers and functions similar to those of its English counterpart.

When America declared independence, the citizens of Maryland opted to retain this judicial structure, the only change being that the Chancellor would be appointed by the Governor of the State, by and with the consent of the council, and should hold his office during good behavior. Section 30 of the Maryland Declaration of Rights adopted at that time discusses the role of the Chancellor:

That the independency and uprightness of Judges are essential to the impartial administration of justice, and a great security to the rights and liberties of the people; wherefore the Chancellor and all Judges ought to hold commissions during good behavior, and the said Chancellor and Judges shall be removed for misbehavior, on conviction in a court of law, and may be removed by the Governor upon the address of the General Assembly, provided that two-thirds of all the members of each House concur in said address. That salaries liberal, but not profuse, ought to be 'secured to the Chancellor and the Judges during continuance of their commissions. * * * No Chancellor or Judge ought to hold any other office, civil or military, or receive fees or perquisites of any kind.

The first Chancellor of Maryland, Richard Sprigg, was directly appointed by the Maryland General Assembly, on April 3, 1777, as a governor had not yet been elected at that time. Sprigg was sworn into office on April 21, 1777. Sprigg resigned on March 20, 1778, having never issued a decree (in part because the courts saw little activity during the war), and was replaced by John Rogers of Prince George's County, who assumed office on the day of Sprigg's resignation.

Other notable holders of this office include Alexander Contee Hanson Sr., William Kilty, and Theodorick Bland. The High Court of Chancery ceased to exist on the June 4th, 1854.

== List of chancellors ==
Name	Term start	Term end
John Rogers	1778	1789
Alexander Contee Hanson Sr.	1789	1806
William Kilty	1806	1821
John Johnson Sr.	1821	1824
Theodorick Bland	1824	1846
John Johnson Jr.	1846	1854
