= London Town Publik House =

Historic building in Maryland, USA

- William Brown House
- U.S. National Register of Historic Places
- U.S. National Historic Landmark
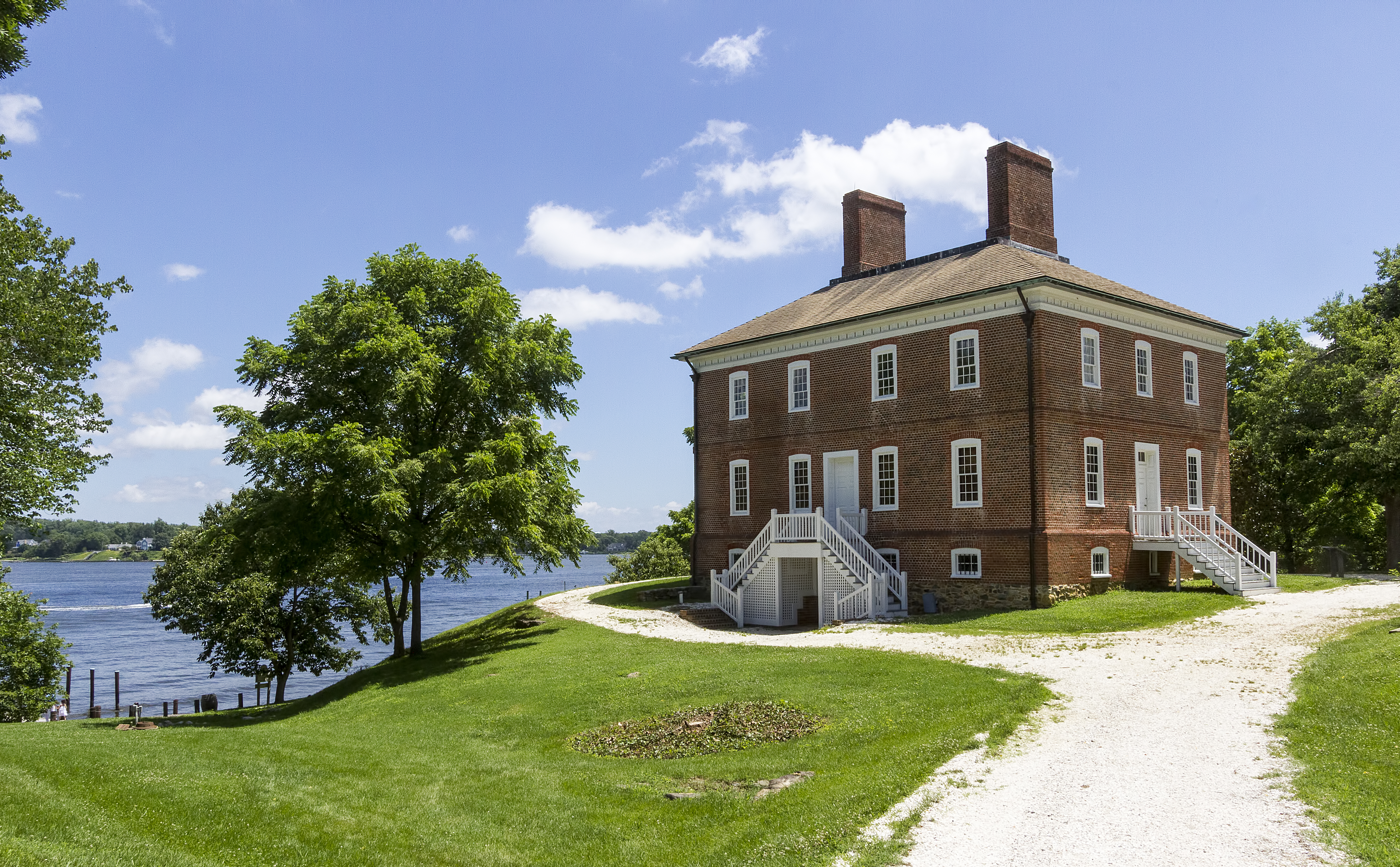
- William Brown House, South and West Facades, July 2013

- Location within Maryland Location within the United States
- Location: Historic London Town and Gardens, Woodland Beach, Maryland
- Coordinates: 38°56′30″N 76°32′25″W
- Area: 1 acre (0.40 ha)
- Built: 1745
- Architectural style: Georgian
- NRHP reference No.: 70000262

Significant dates
- Added to NRHP: April 15, 1970
- Designated NHL: April 15, 1970

The William Brown House, also known as London Town Publik House or Londontowne Public House, is a former Colonial tavern located in the Historic London Town and Gardens museum complex in Woodland Beach, Anne Arundel County, Maryland. Completed in 1764, it is one of the best-preserved examples of a colonial-era brick tavern house. From 1828 to 1965 the structure was used as a county alms house. It was declared a National Historic Landmark in 1970.

== Description ==
The William Brown House is located northeast of the Woodland Beach community in Edgewater, Maryland, at the end of Londontown Road on the south bank of South River, about four miles from Annapolis. Woodland Beach is now also known locally as Londontowne.

The William Brown House is a two-story brick structure with an elevated basement, seven bays wide and three deep. The hipped roof is cut off to form a deck or terrace with a massive chimney at each end. Windows in the front (south) facade are topped by brick flat arches, while windows in the rear and ends have segmental arches. Windows are nine-over-nine sashes at the first floor and nine-over-six at the second floor. A three-bay-wide pedimented pavilion projects from the center of the main facade, containing the main entrance and approached by a flight of brick and stone steps. The house is unique in its use of all-header-bond on all four sides.

The interior features a wide living hall extending from front to back, intersected at its midpoint by smaller side halls leading to doors in the ends of the house. The rear (north) portion of the hall contains a fireplace and was used as a living space, while the front portion contains the stairs. Four equal-sized rooms are located in the corners formed by the hall arrangement. There are doors in each of the four elevations.

== History ==
The William Brown House was built by William Brown between 1758 and 1764. It was located on the main road connecting Williamsburg, Virginia and Philadelphia, Pennsylvania. The South River was crossed at that point by a ferry, which was also owned by Brown. It was part of a community of about 100 lots, of which it is the only substantial survivor. The house was an extravagance for Brown, and his debts eventually caused him to convey the house and property to the estate of James Dick, who had lent Brown the money for the house and lots. The house was acquired by the county for use as a poorhouse in 1828, a role it served until 1965. It is presently a museum, operated by the London Town Foundation.

== See also ==
- Upton Scott House in Annapolis, also built by Brown, which closely resembles this building
- List of National Historic Landmarks in Maryland
- National Register of Historic Places listings in Anne Arundel County, Maryland

== Gallery ==
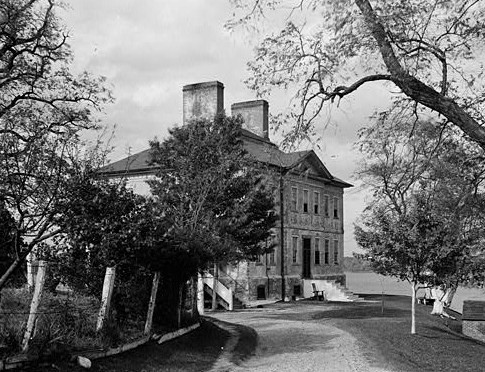
Almshouse at London Town, London Town Road, South River vicinity (Anne Arundel County, Maryland), November 1936

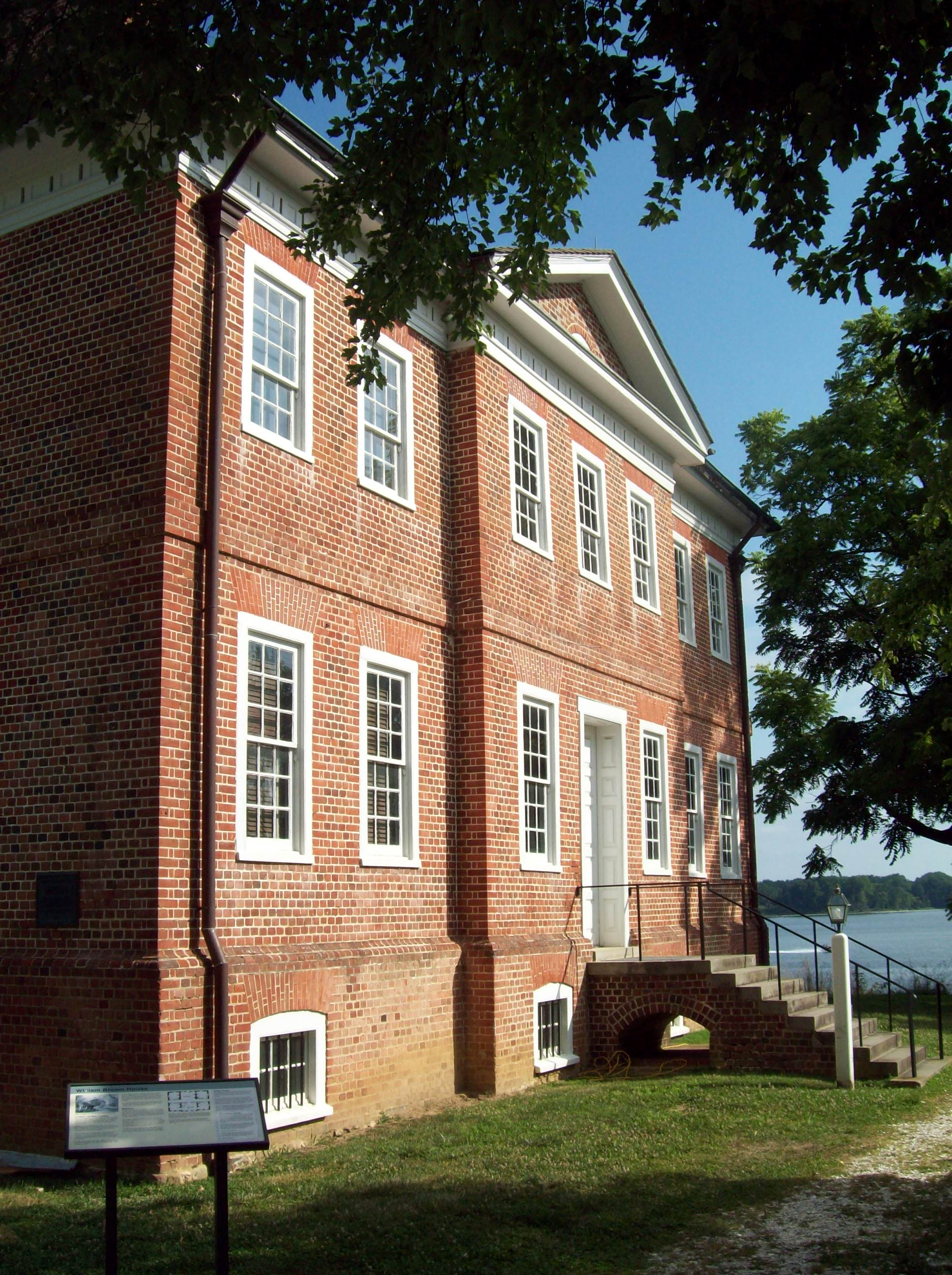
William Brown House, East Facade, July 2009

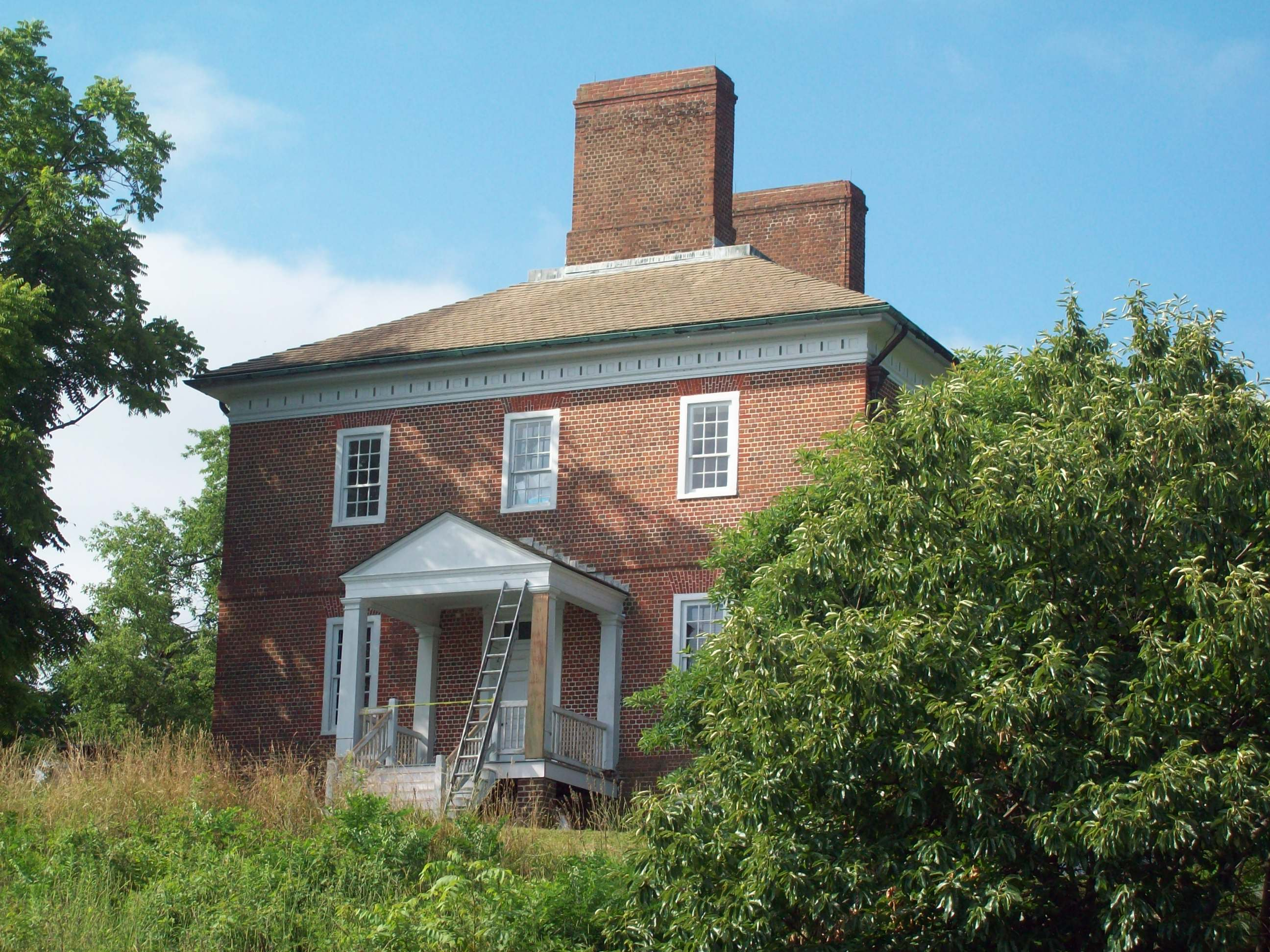
William Brown House, North Facade, July 2009 (View from Dock)
