= Upton Scott House =

Historic house in Maryland, United States

- U.S. National Register of Historic Places
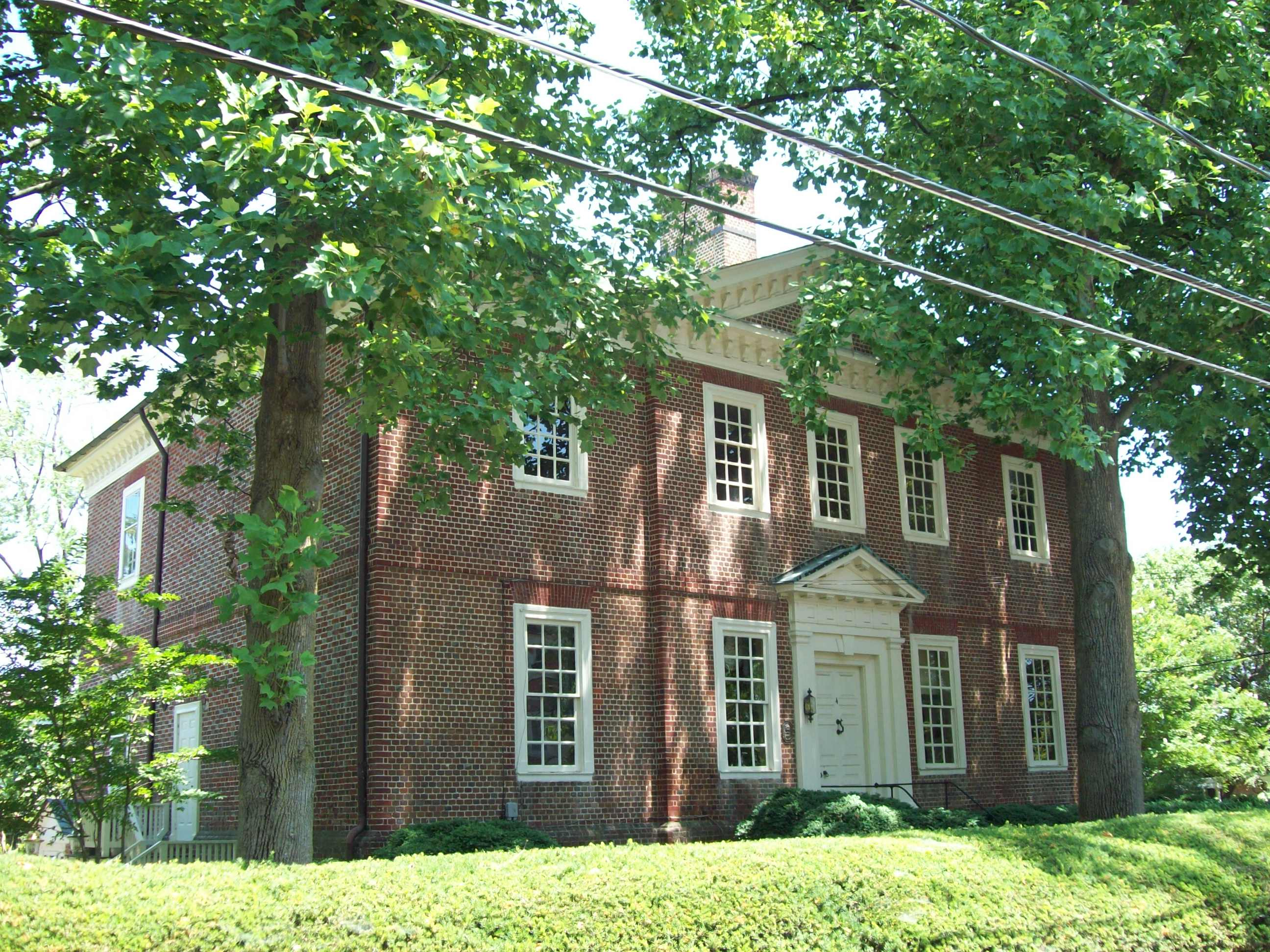
- Upton Scott House, July 2009

- Location within Maryland Location within the United States
- Location: 4 Shipwright St., Annapolis, Maryland
- Coordinates: 38°58′29.6″N 76°29′23.6″W
- Built: 1762
- Architectural style: Georgian
- NRHP reference No.: 75000863
- Added to NRHP: June 5, 1975

The Upton Scott House is a historic home in Annapolis, Anne Arundel County, Maryland, United States. It is a 2 1/2-story, rectangular brick house. The interior is lavish, and the house has sustained only minor alterations in the 20th century. The house was built for Dr. Upton Scott, the personal physician to the Royal Governor of the Province of Maryland, and is of the transitional Georgian style. The house was built by William Brown, and closely resembles Brown's house on the South River, now known as the London Town Publik House.

The Upton Scott House was listed on the National Register of Historic Places in 1975.
