= Living shoreline =

Coastal protection

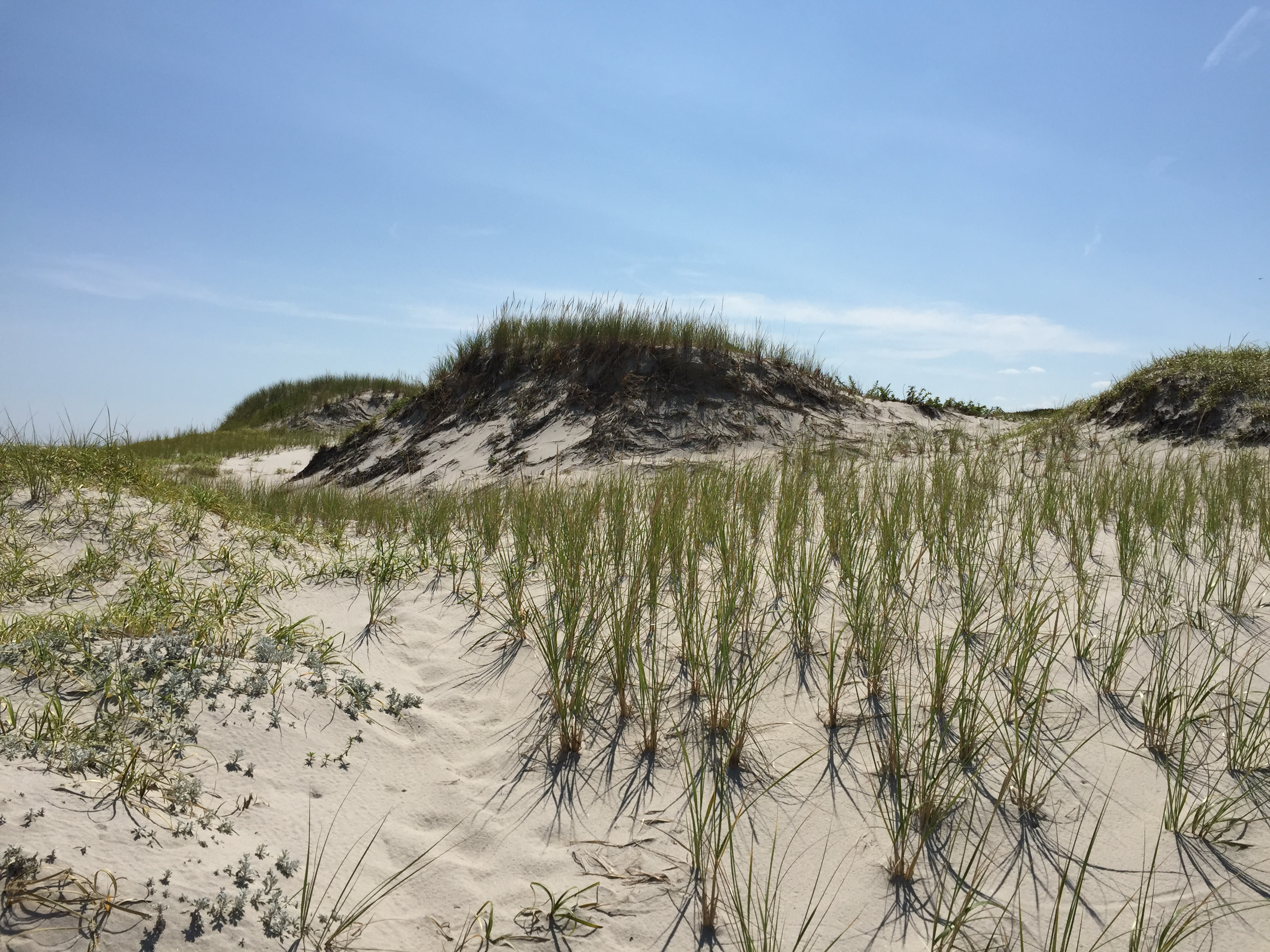
Beach grasses planted to prevent erosion at Island Beach State Park, New Jersey

A living shoreline is a coastal defense designed to utilize natural processes for the prevention of shoreline erosion and the protection of marshes. Unlike structures such as bulkheads or seawalls which deflect wave energy and may increase adjacent shoreline erosion, living shorelines aim to create buffers for absorbing wave impacts.

The process of creating a living shoreline is referred to as soft engineering, which utilizes techniques that incorporate ecological principles in shoreline stabilization. The natural materials used in the construction of living shorelines create and maintain valuable habitats. Structural and organic materials commonly used in the construction of living shorelines include sand, wetland plants, sand fill, oyster reefs, submerged aquatic vegetation, stones and coir fiber logs.

== Benefits and ecosystem services ==
- Shoreline stabilization
- Riparian and intertidal protection
- Water quality improvements from upland run-off filtration
- Terrestrial and aquatic habitat creation
- Absorption of wave energy, leading to reduced erosion rates
- Preservation of natural shoreline exchanges
- Enhancement of fisheries feeding and breeding habitat
- Adaptability and use in a wide range of environments
- Potential for less associated costs compared to traditional structures such as seawalls and bulkheads
- Creates and preserves nursery and critical feeding habitats for aquatic life
- Allows for a more natural aesthetic display than traditional structures

== Design ==
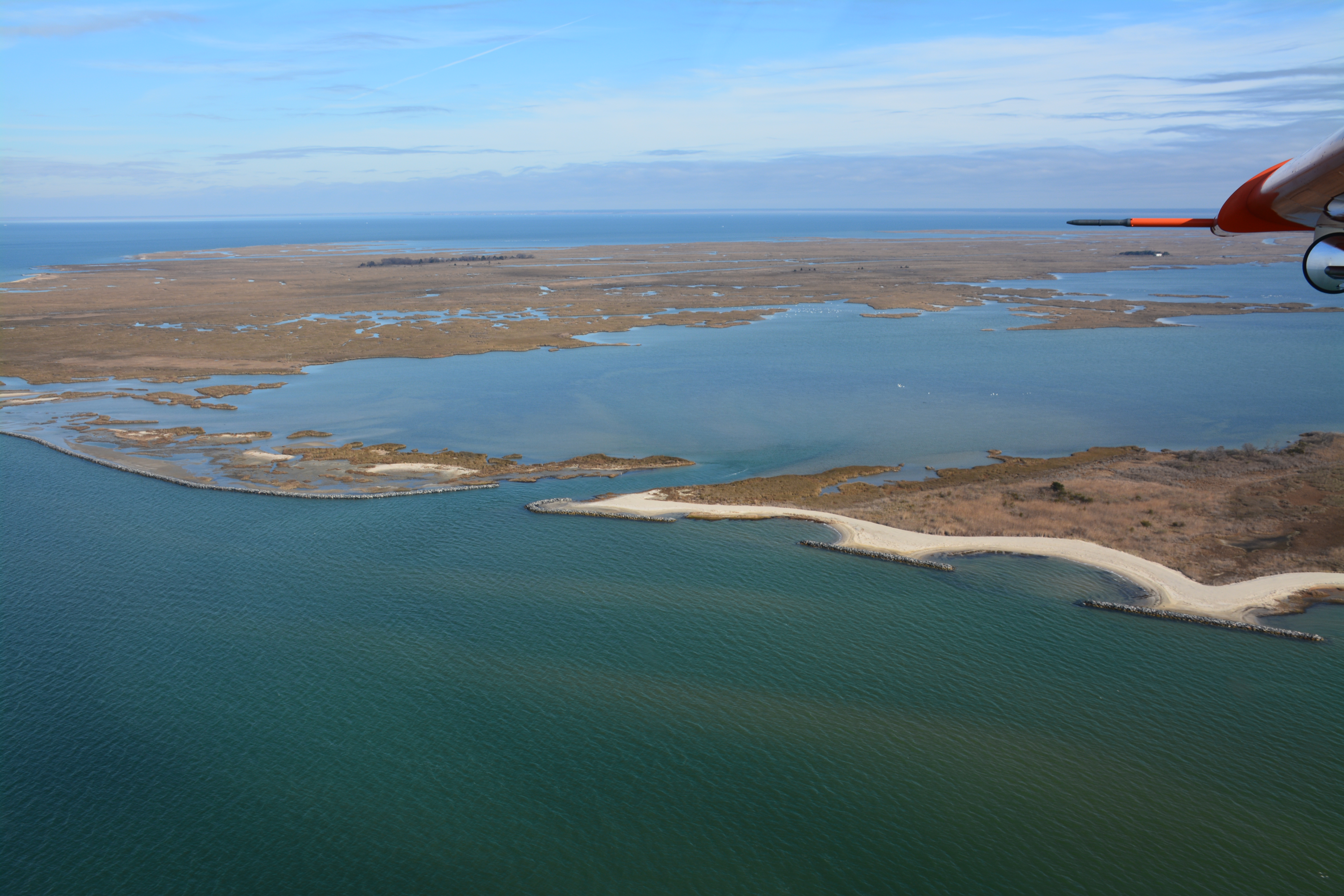
A completed living shoreline project at Glenn Martin National Wildlife Refuge, Smith Island, Maryland

Many factors need to be addressed when preparing a living shoreline project. Permitting requirements and appropriate restoration strategies for a particular habitat are two critical topics for consideration before construction begins.

=== Planning and implementation steps ===
1. Analysis of the site: The bank erosion rate, elevation level, vegetation, wave energy, wind patterns, wave activity and soil type of the proposed site need to be examined to determine if it is an appropriate area for living shoreline stabilization. Restoration plans of stabilization activities are designed upon completion of the initial site analysis.

2. Permitting: Before any implementation begins, permits should be applied for and obtained through the appropriate regulatory agencies. All project plans need to be in compliance with local, state and federal laws before any construction begins to avoid legal issues and ensure long-term sustainability.

3. Site preparation: Once the necessary permits are obtained, preparation begins by clearing all debris, unstable trees and existing failing structures, such as bulkheads, from the site. In addition, any issues regarding stormwater runoff must also be addressed prior to the installation of a living shoreline.

4. Project installation: Generally, living shoreline structures will include planting marsh, riparian, or other types of aquatic vegetation. Bio-logs, organic fiber mats and oyster shells are also readily used materials throughout installation.

5. Maintenance and monitoring: The restored habitat area should be regularly monitored upon completion to obtain data on project successes. The collection of such data will improve construction and implementation strategies of future projects. The site should also be maintained by replanting necessary vegetation, removing debris and adding sand fill when appropriate. The materials should also be monitored to ensure they are staying in place and achieving desired shoreline stabilization goals.

=== Materials ===
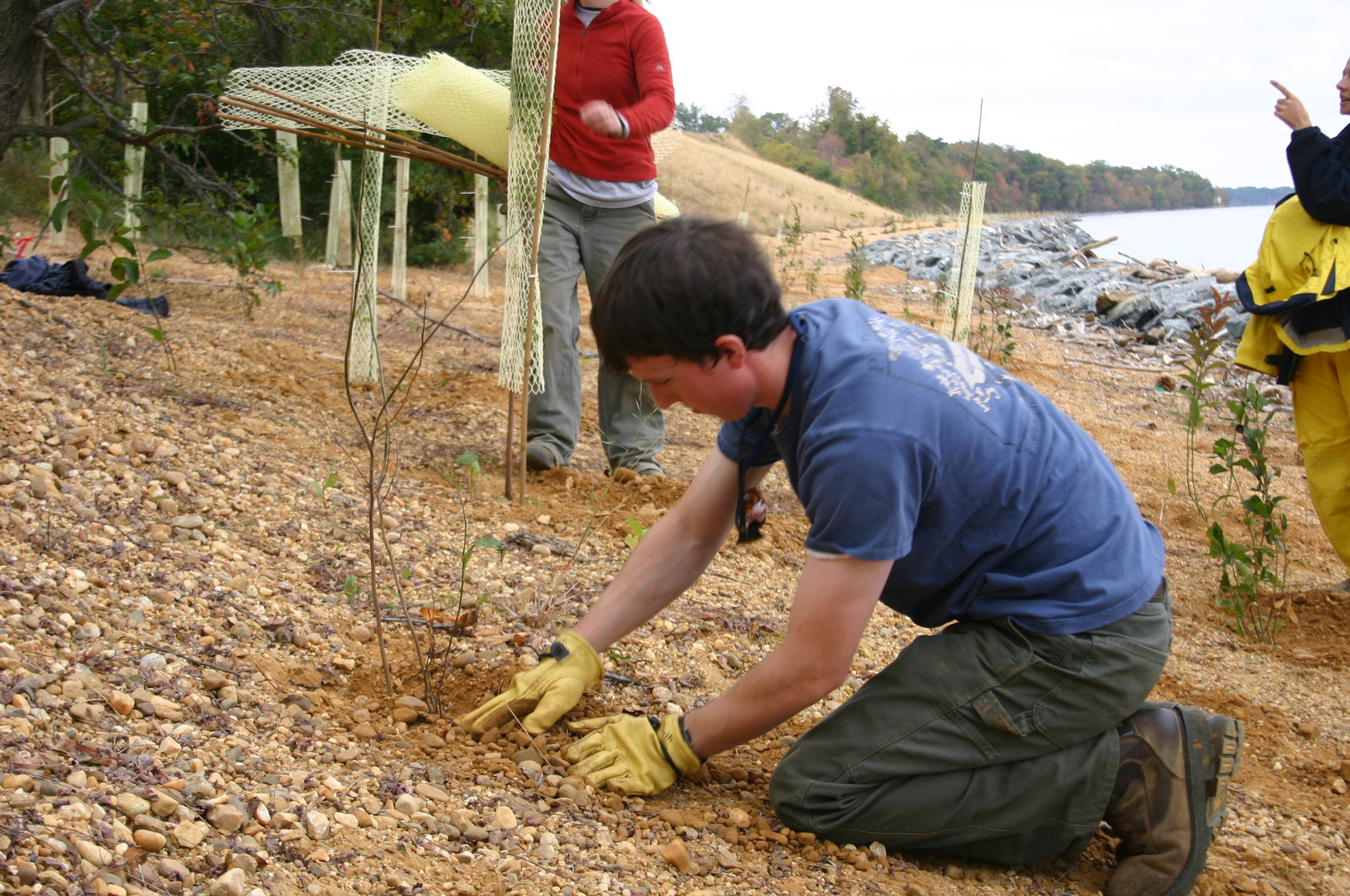
Planting trees and shrubs for a Potomac River stabilization project in Maryland

==== Vegetation zone ====
- Clean dredge material and sand fill are generally used to construct a rolling slope to weaken wave energy and provide an area to plant vegetation. Regrading, filling and replanting native vegetation can occur on sites that do not have a bulkhead or on sites where bulkheads have been removed. If removing the bulkhead is not feasible, another option is to fill sand in front of the structure and regrade and replant vegetation on the shoreline and embankment.
- Roots from trees and grass stabilize the riparian area above high tide by gripping the soil. Such activity results in bank erosion minimization, wildlife habitat creation and upland runoff filtration. The type of plants that make up common riparian zones typically include grasses, shrubs and woody trees but the species of each are dependent on the naturally occurring vegetation of the area.

==== Wetland and beach areas ====
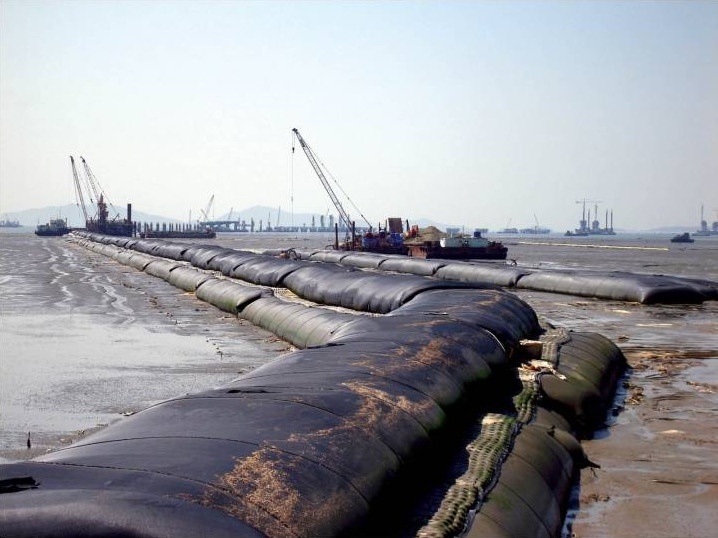
Geotextile tubes filled with sand

- Breakwaters provide erosion control and facilitate habitat development by breaking up wave activity in open-water areas. These structures, made with rock and oyster spat, should be placed in areas of medium to high wave energy and arranged parallel to the bank. Once implemented, the area around the shoreline should be calmer than before which can allow for the creation of marsh and intertidal habitat through the replanting of marsh grasses and other submerged aquatic plants.
- Filter fabric is a key element in minimizing soil loss under rocks. This porous material made from natural elements is commonly implemented under breakwaters and rock sills or other hybrid living shoreline locations.
- Geotextile material tubes measure about 12 feet in diameter, are filled with sediment and aligned with the shoreline to weaken wave energy and protect against erosion. These tubes facilitate oyster reef development and create areas to dispose of new dredge material.
- Low-crested rock sills are formed by the parallel arrangement and underwater placement of single rocks along shorelines and marshes. The rocks decrease erosion rates in these areas by dispelling oncoming wave energy. The placement of these sills are no greater than 6 to 12 inches over the mean high water mark and typically divided into sections to allow for the passing of boats, large waves and wildlife.
- Mangroves play a critical role in shoreline stabilization through the trapping of nutrients and sediments and dissipation of wave energy administered by their extensive root system. The incorporation of mangroves with living shorelines could play a large role in decreasing erosion rates since they naturally occur in subtropical and estuarine tropical areas. More specifically, mangroves are typically found in southern Florida, the Caribbean and some areas of southern Louisiana.
- Marsh grasses are generally planted up to the mean high tide line and in the water of the intertidal zones to break up wave energy, provide fish and wildlife habitat and improve water quality through upland runoff filtration. Studies show that plantings may show more success when administered in the spring in areas with existing marsh, mild wind conditions and surrounding areas of less than 3 miles of open water.

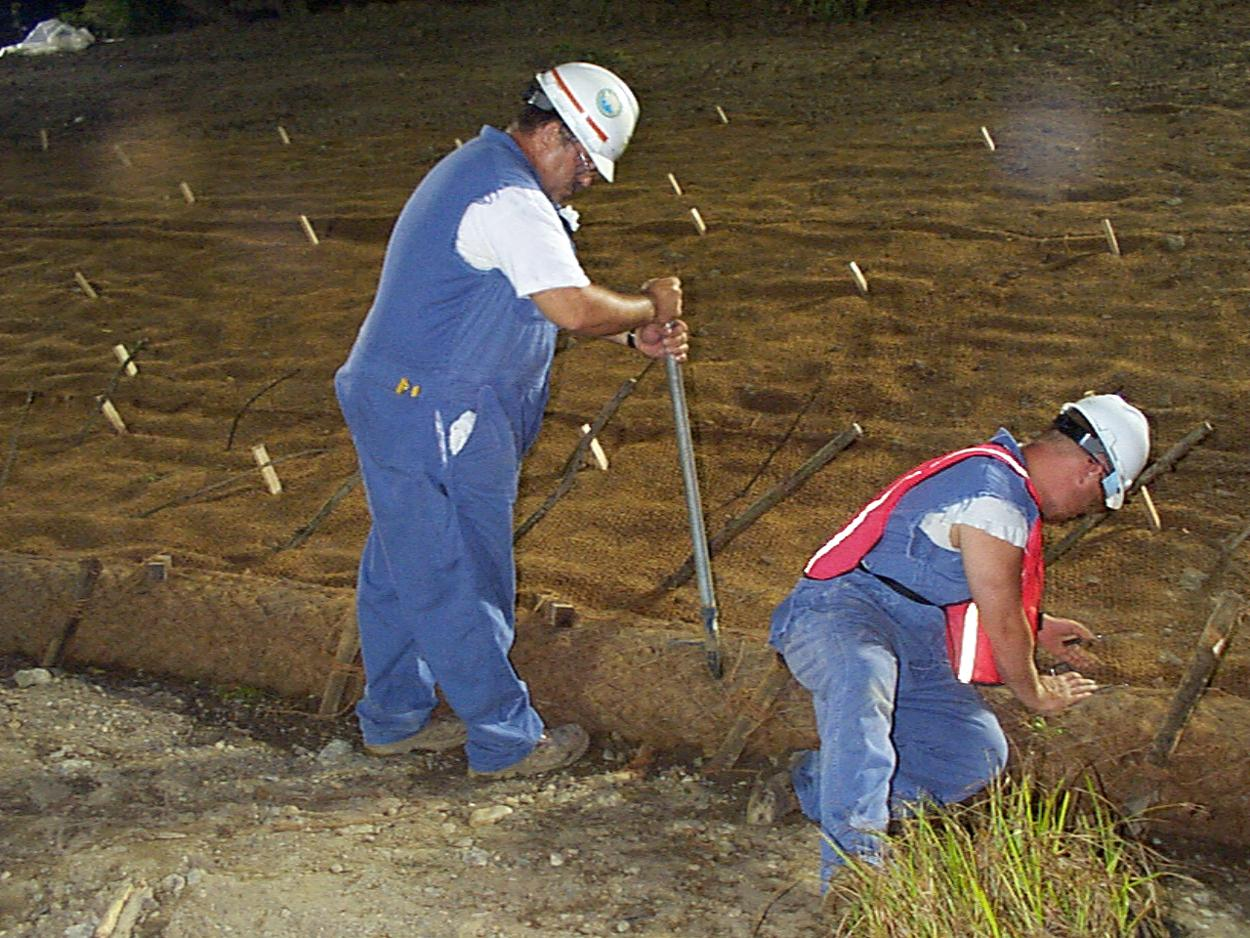
Coir fiber log installation

- Natural bio-logs/fiber logs can be used to reduce bank erosion and stabilize inclines by implementation at the bottom of a slope or in the water which is formed to the bank line and secured in place. The coconut fiber and netting are biodegradable and work to grab sediment, hold moisture to facilitate vegetative growth, and allow stability of the bank while roots develop.
- Natural fiber matting can be made from a combination of biodegradable, organic mediums but is primarily made from jute, straw, coir fiber or wood. Placing such matting over an abrupt eroding slope minimizes sediment loss and catches sediments otherwise transported by wave dynamics. Natural fiber matting can also be implemented with riparian vegetation or marsh grass plantings to improve bank stabilization.
- Rock footers are small quantities of boulder or rock intended to enhance bank stabilization and add additional support to bio-logs. Rock footers can also be used to support the structure of the biodegradable fiber logs, so that they do not fall out into steeper areas of the bank.
- Rubble and recycled concrete can be used to form a breakwater offshore of a living shoreline site to refract wave energy before it hits the area. The addition of oyster spat these breakwaters can simultaneously enhance water quality and facilitate habitat growth.

==== Submerged aquatic zone ====
- Oyster shell reefs are another option when creating living shorelines. Oysters are critical in enhancing water quality and providing habitat to fish species, so creation of oyster reefs to decrease shoreline erosion rates have many added benefits. In addition, the establishment of oyster reefs play a role in protecting valuable aquatic vegetation of the marine ecosystem. To ensure a healthy reef, only clean oyster shells that have been sitting in the sun for adequate time should be used in the construction process.
- Reef balls of oysters can achieve similar outcomes as oyster shell reefs but have a different implementation process. This type of artificial reef is made up of small, hallow concrete balls that facilitates the build-up of oyster shells as oyster spat take hold on the outside of the structure. An advantage of this implementation strategy is that it decreases poaching of oysters which can be a common obstacle in living shoreline construction that use oyster shells.
- Seagrass beds create natural buffer zones against shoreline erosion when implemented in association with living shorelines. In addition, seagrass beds enhance water quality, improve sediment stabilization, supply habitat and food for aquatic organisms and dissipate high-energy waves.
- Wave Attenuation Devices (WADs) act as a "wave muffler" reducing the wave energy before reaching shore. These WADs also provide essential marine habitat for corals, oysters and fish while rebuilding the shore naturally by re-depositing the suspended sand back upon the shore.

== Selected projects ==
- VIMS teaching marsh, Gloucester Point, Virginia
- Jamestown 4-H Camp, James River, James City County, Virginia
- The Hermitage Museum and Gardens, Norfolk, Virginia
- Longwood University's Hull Springs Farm, Westmoreland County, Virginia
- Jefferson Patterson Park & Museum, Calvert County, Maryland
- South River Federation, MD
- St John's College, Annapolis, Maryland
- Magothy Beach Road, Pasadena, Maryland
- San Francisco Bay
- Piscataway Park, Potomac River, Maryland
- Delaware
- Havre de Grace, Maryland
