= Thomas Point Shoal Light =

Lighthouse in Maryland, United States

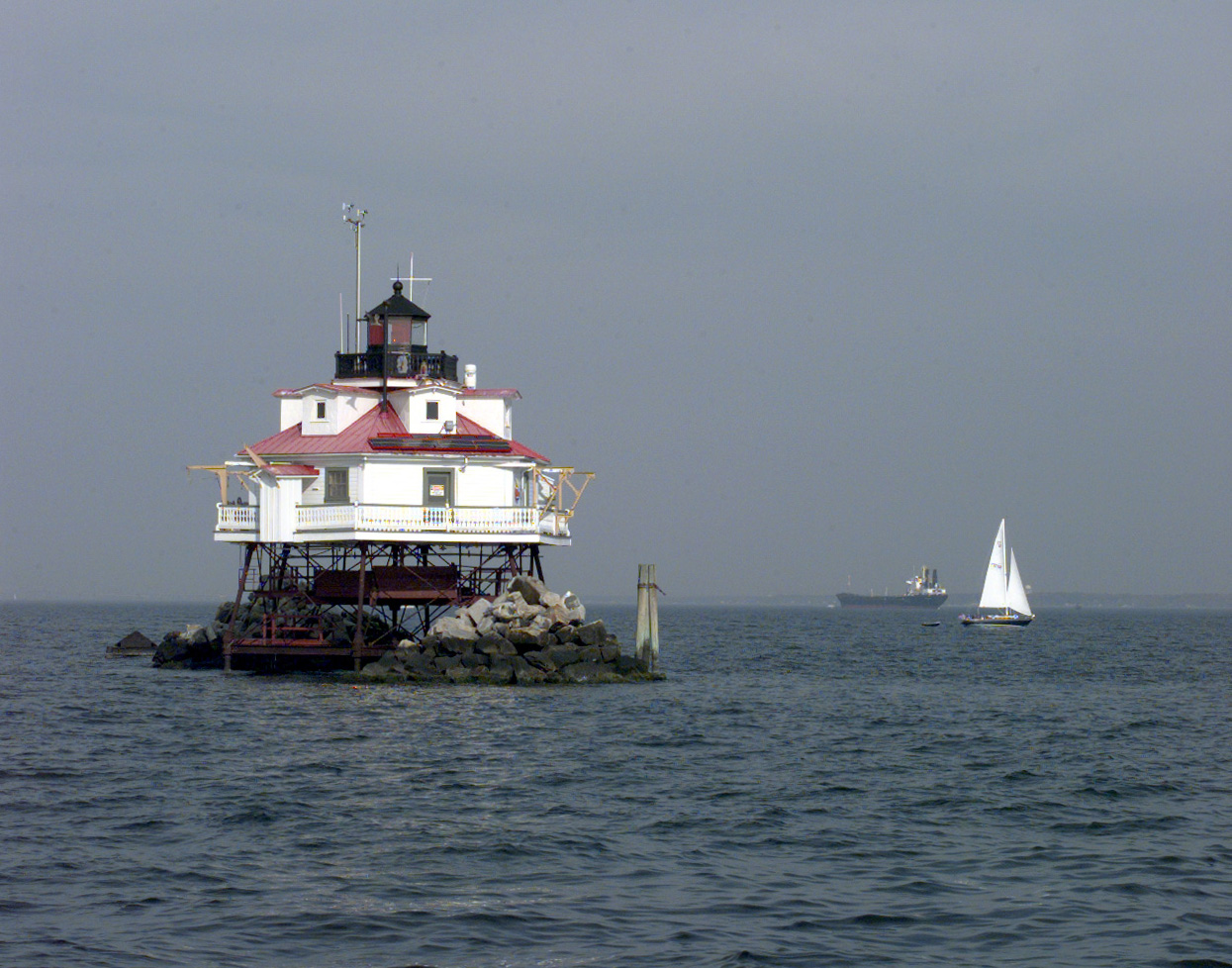
- Location: off Thomas Point at the mouth of the South River in the Chesapeake Bay
- Coordinates: 38.899°N 76.436°W

Tower
- Constructed: 1875
- Foundation: screw-pile
- Construction: cast-iron/wood
- Automated: 1986
- Height: 15 m (49 ft)
- Shape: Square lantern on hexagonal house
- Markings: White with red roof and black lantern
- Heritage: National Historic Landmark, National Register of Historic Places listed place
- Fog signal: Horn: 1 every 15 sec

Light
- First lit: 1875
- Focal height: 43 feet (13 m)
- Lens: fourth-order Fresnel lens (original), 9.8 inches (250 mm) solar-powered lens (current)
- Range: White 16 nautical miles (30 km; 18 mi); Red 11 nautical miles (20 km; 13 mi)
- Characteristic: Flashing white 5 sec, with two red sectors
- Thomas Point Shoal Light Station
- U.S. National Register of Historic Places
- U.S. National Historic Landmark
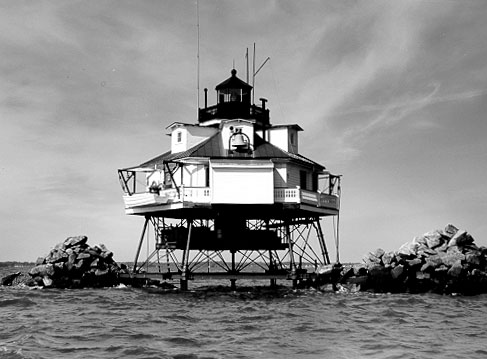
- Location: Kent Island, Chesapeake Bay, Annapolis, Maryland
- Area: 5 acres (2.0 ha)
- Architect: U.S. Lighthouse Service
- Architectural style: Screwpile design
- NRHP reference No.: 75000864

Significant dates
- Added to NRHP: February 20, 1975
- Designated NHL: January 20, 1999

The Thomas Point Shoal Light, also known as Thomas Point Shoal Light Station, is a historic lighthouse in the Chesapeake Bay on the east coast of the United States, and the most recognized lighthouse in Maryland. It is the only screw-pile lighthouse in the bay which stands at its original site. The current structure is a 1½ story hexagonal wooden cottage, equipped with a foghorn as well as the light.

== History ==
A stone lighthouse was constructed in 1825 on shore at Thomas Point by John Donahoo, Thomas Point Light. It was replaced in 1838 by another stone tower. The point was subject to continuing erosion (which would eventually bring down the lighthouse on the point in 1894), and in 1873 Congress appropriated $20,000 for the construction of a screw-pile structure out in the bay, Thomas Point Shoal Light. With an additional $15,000 appropriation in 1875, the light was built and activated in November of that year. It took 30 workers to set each cast iron beam 12 ft (3.7 m) into the Chesapeake Bay's bottom.

Ice was a perpetual threat to screw-pile lights on the Chesapeake, and in 1877 the original lens was destroyed when it toppled by shaking from ice floes. This lens was replaced, and the additional piles and riprap were placed around the foundation in order to protect it. By 1964 it was the last staffed light in the Chesapeake Bay, and it was not automated until 1986. It is currently the last unaltered screwpile cottage-type lighthouse on its original foundation in the Chesapeake Bay.

== Preservation ==
Concerns for its preservation brought it a National Register of Historic Places listing in 1975 and National Historic Landmark status in 1999.

In 2004, ownership of the lighthouse passed to the city of Annapolis, Maryland, which now maintains the structure in conjunction with Anne Arundel County, Maryland, the Annapolis Maritime Museum, and the Chesapeake Chapter of the U.S. Lighthouse Society. In 2019, a Lighthouse Society spokesman said that the steel substructure, last replaced in the 1980s, is severely rusted and requires $300,000 in repairs. Fortunately, the cast iron screw pilings remain in sound condition, "as good today as they were 144 years ago", said the Baltimore Sun in reporting on the needed funding in August 2019.

The United States Coast Guard continues to maintain the navigational aids at the Lighthouse. The lighthouse keeper's former living quarters are open to the public three months out of the year, through boat tours departing from Annapolis, organized by the U.S. Lighthouse Society. Tickets are purchased on their web site.

== Sources ==
- "Thomas Point Shoal Lighthouse: History". thomaspointlighthouse.org. Archived from the original on June 28, 2007.
- Thomas Point Shoal Lighthouse - from Lighthousefriends.com
- de Gast, Robert (1973). The Lighthouses of the Chesapeake. Baltimore: Johns Hopkins University Press. p. 79.
