= Londontowne, Maryland =

- Former census-designated place
- Location of Londontowne, Maryland
- Coordinates: 38°56′10″N 76°33′15″W
- Country: United States
- State: Maryland
- County: Anne Arundel

Area
  - Total: 3.8 sq mi (9.8 km^{2})
  - Land: 3.0 sq mi (7.8 km^{2})
  - Water: 0.77 sq mi (2.0 km^{2})
- Elevation: 26 ft (8 m)

Population (2000)
  - Total: 7,595
  - Density: 2,517/sq mi (971.9/km^{2})
- Time zone: UTC−5 (Eastern (EST))
  - Summer (DST): UTC−4 (EDT)
- FIPS code: 24-47925
- GNIS feature ID: 0588901

Londontowne is an unincorporated area and former census-designated place (CDP) in Anne Arundel County, Maryland, United States, and the site of a former colonial seaport founded on the South River in 1683. The population was 7,595 at the 2000 census. At the 2010 census, the area was delineated as the Edgewater CDP.

== Geography ==
According to the United States Census Bureau, the CDP had a total area of 3.8 square miles (9.8 km^{2}), of which 3.0 square miles (7.8 km^{2}) was land and 0.8 square mile (2.0 km^{2}) (20.11%) was water.

== History ==
London Town was a colonial seaport settlement founded in 1683 near Annapolis. The original wharf was built by Colonel William Burgess, one of the area's original settlers. He parceled his land and sold it and it was established as a town by an act of 1683. It was once considered as the site for the Province of Maryland and was for a time as prominent in trade as Annapolis and Williamsburg, Virginia. It declined and disappeared by the 19th century for reasons including its non-selection as a tobacco inspection station, economic depression, and the Revolutionary War.

Speculation exists that the South River Club's first clubhouse was built here.

== Historic London Town and Gardens ==
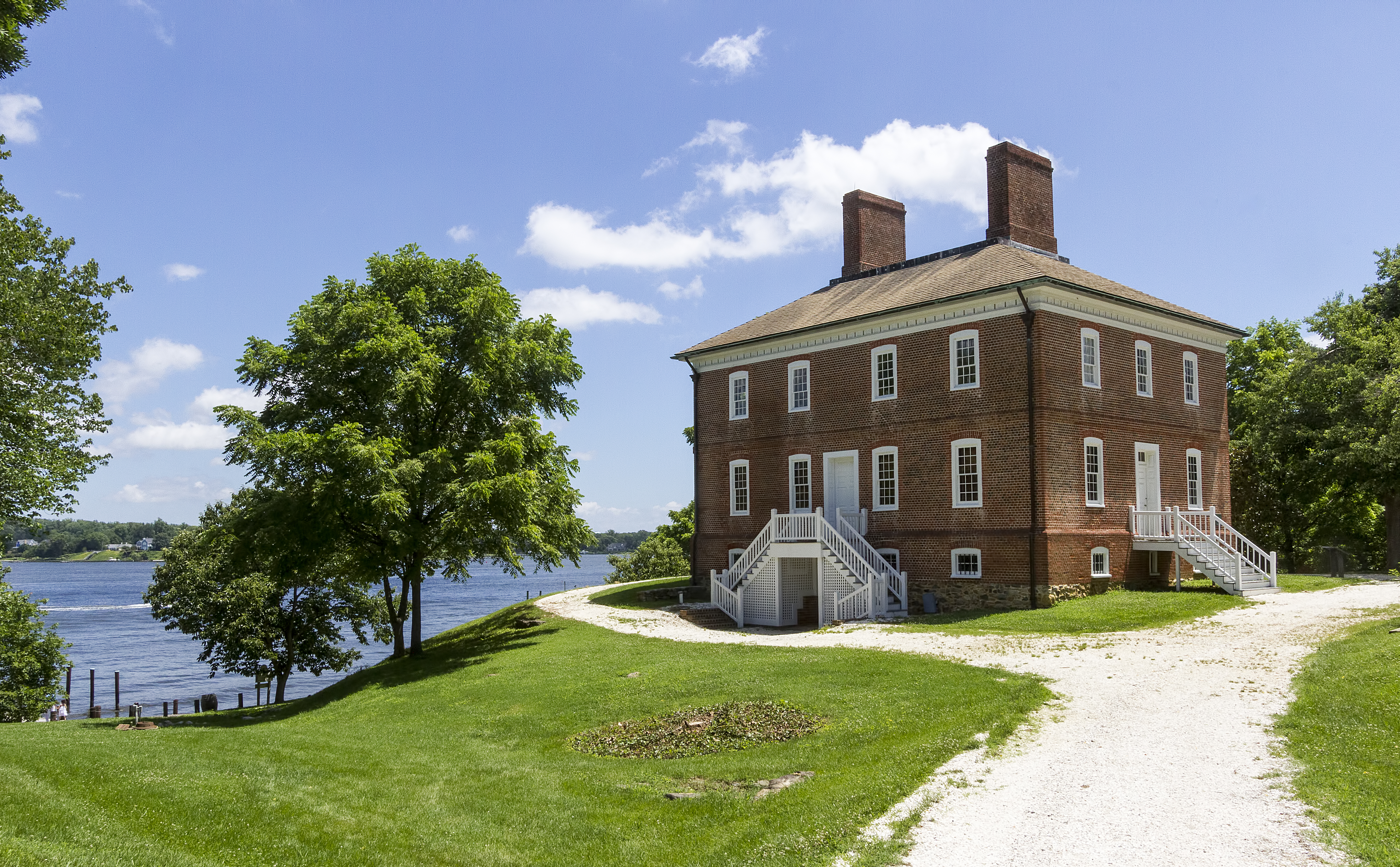
The London Town Publik House (William Brown House) and grounds

Today, the area of the old town comprises the 23-acre (9.3 ha) Historic London Town and Gardens, owned by Anne Arundel County and operated by the London Town Foundation, a 501(c)(3) non-profit. The park includes the London Town Publik House, listed on the National Register of Historic Places and designated a National Historic Landmark, as well as reconstructed period buildings, a public museum, an archaeology lab, and extensive gardens. The park offers guided tours, musket fire demonstrations, and various other educational events, and its facilities may be rented as an event venue.

London Town's 8-acre (3.2 ha) woodland gardens began in the late 1960s as naturalized shade gardens. Today they include an azalea glade with both deciduous and evergreen plantings; a camellia walk with winter blooming camellias; a holly collection; and a winter garden featuring plants of winter interest, with evergreens such as mountain laurel (Kalmia latifolia).

== Demographics ==
At the 2000 census there were 7,595 people, 2,927 households, and 2,040 families in the CDP. The population density was 2,517.3 inhabitants per square mile (971.9/km^{2}). There were 3,095 housing units at an average density of 1,025.8 per square mile (396.1/km^{2}). The racial makup of the CDP was 95.89% White, 1.97% African American, 0.32% Native American, 0.49% Asian, 0.01% Pacific Islander, 0.16% from other races, and 1.16% from two or more races. Hispanic or Latino people of any race were 1.95%.

Of the 2,927 households 31.8% had children under the age of 18 living with them, 55.2% were married couples living together, 10.1% had a female householder with no husband present, and 30.3% were non-families. 22.9% of households were one person and 6.6% were one person aged 65 or older. The average household size was 2.56 and the average family size was 3.02.

The age distribution was 23.5% under the age of 18, 6.7% from 18 to 24, 33.3% from 25 to 44, 25.6% from 45 to 64, and 11.0% 65 or older. The median age was 38 years. For every 100 females, there were 98.7 males. For every 100 females age 18 and over, there were 95.9 males.

The median household income was $63,021 and the median family income was $68,190. Males had a median income of $45,589 versus $34,555 for females. The per capita income for the CDP was $31,245. About 2.5% of families and 3.3% of the population were below the poverty line, including 2.6% of those under age 18 and 4.5% of those age 65 or over.

== See also ==
- List of botanical gardens in the United States
- Colonel Nicholas Gassaway, Commissioner of Londontowne 1683
