= North River (Maryland) =

River in Maryland, USA

Coordinates: 38°58′58″N 76°36′29″W

The North River is a tributary of the South River in Maryland.
