= Twin Lakes Beach, Manitoba =

Beach and community in Manitoba, Canada

Coordinates: 50°20′12″N 97°57′42″W

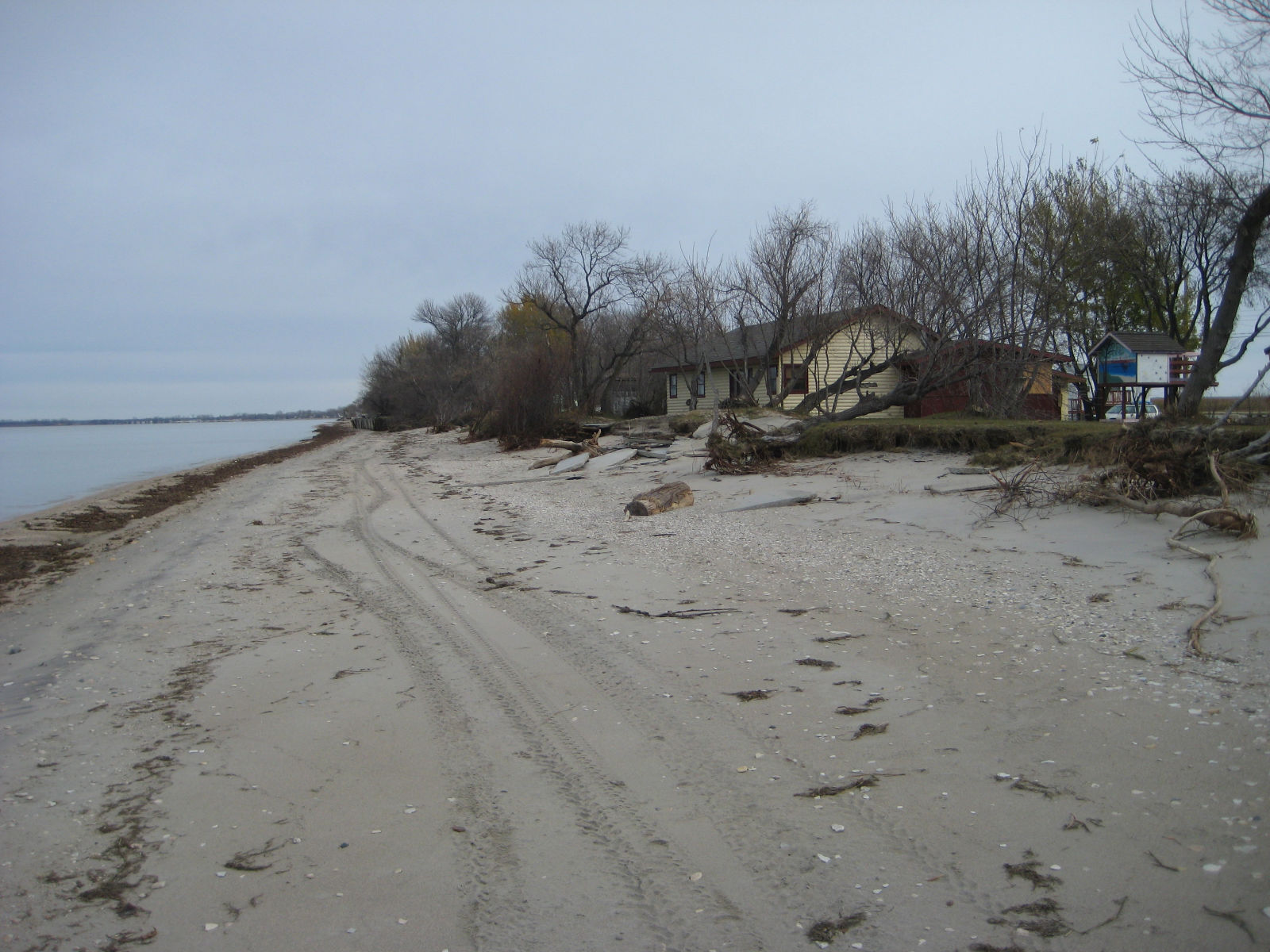
The sandy beaches of Twin Lakes Beach

Twin Lakes Beach (French: Plage Twin Lakes), also known locally by many as simply Twin Beaches, is a beach and community in the Canadian province of Manitoba. On Lake Manitoba, it is about 100 kilometres (62 mi) north-west of the provincial capital, Winnipeg. Twin Lakes Beach is in both the Rural Municipality of St. Laurent (French: la Municipalité Rurale de Saint-Laurent) and the Rural Municipality of Woodlands, and it is in the town of St. Laurent.

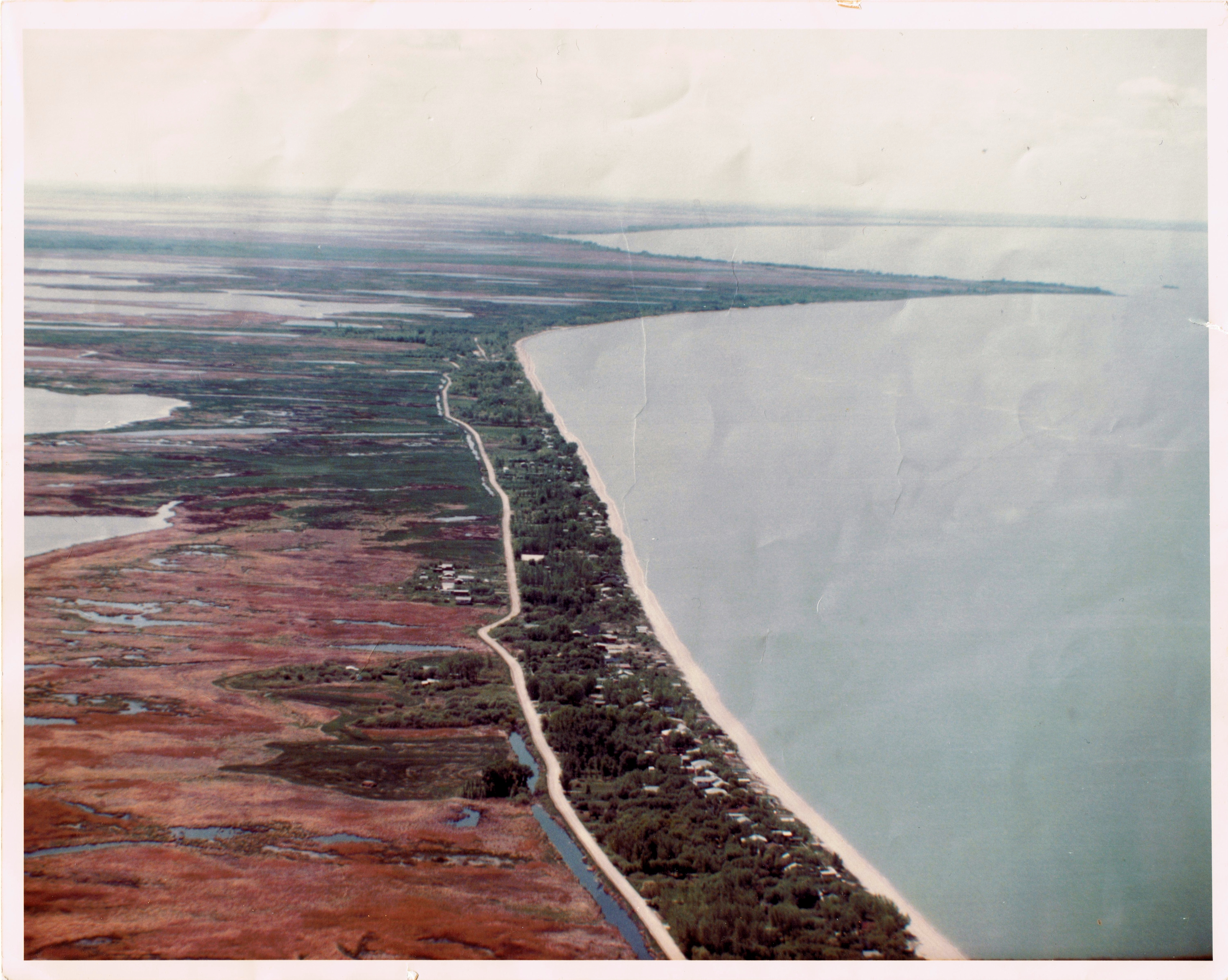
Twin Lakes Beach from the air in the late 1970s or the early 1980s. Note the beach and the dry marshland.

On a natural isthmus dividing Lake Francis and Lake Manitoba, Twin Lakes Beach was formed by the natural process of sand accumulating between the two bodies of water over a period of years of being transferred from the bank of one lake to the bank of another lake by wind and water. The sand then continued to build up and eventually formed a sand dune. Plants can strive on the natural dune because after a storm occurs on the lake, the water levels increase, washing dead seaweed and other organic matter, onto the sand. After many years of decomposition, the compost turns to soil and acts as a fertilizer for local plant life. As a result, grass, plants, and wildlife are now to the area. The water, however, continuously laps the shore, due to moving air and currents, leaving a section of the dune eroded where sand remains, forming a beach.

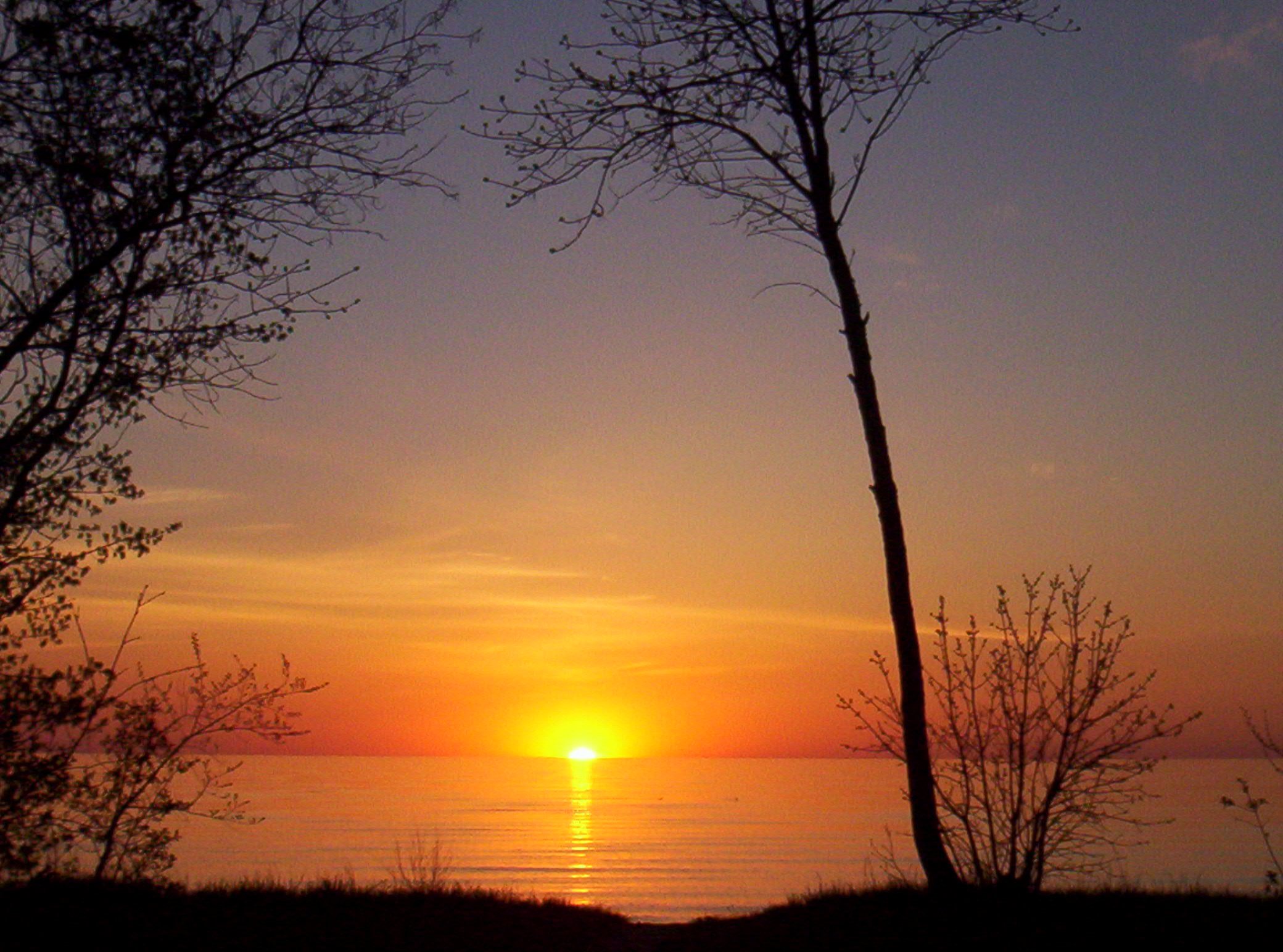
Sunset at Twin Lakes Beach

Lake Francis is a relatively small lake, with a high percentage of water area being marsh and wetlands. Lake Manitoba, however, is Manitoba's third-largest lake and can be described as a long, wide, but shallow hyposaline lake, which does not support a wetland ecosystem but is home to many species of fish and waterfowl which dwell in the area. Lake Manitoba boasts a high number of cottage dwellings and sandy beaches, mainly occupied in the summer months. The area around Twin Lakes Beach and St. Laurent is composed of reasonably-fertile land, which is suitable for crops. The land that is not as fertile is used for pastures, grasslands, or land to be surveyed into future private properties. There are also an abundance of trees and forests around the area.

The earliest records of civilization (of course long after Aboriginal peoples inhabited Manitoba, prior to dated history) around the Twin Lakes Beach and St. Laurent area began in the early 19th century, when the McKay family, of Metis descent, were one of the first families to settle in St. Laurent, on the shores of Lake Manitoba. The family found all the resources that they found important to them - fishing, hunting, and agriculture. The community grew, attracting new immigrants to the province who were looking for an affordable, resourceful way of life.

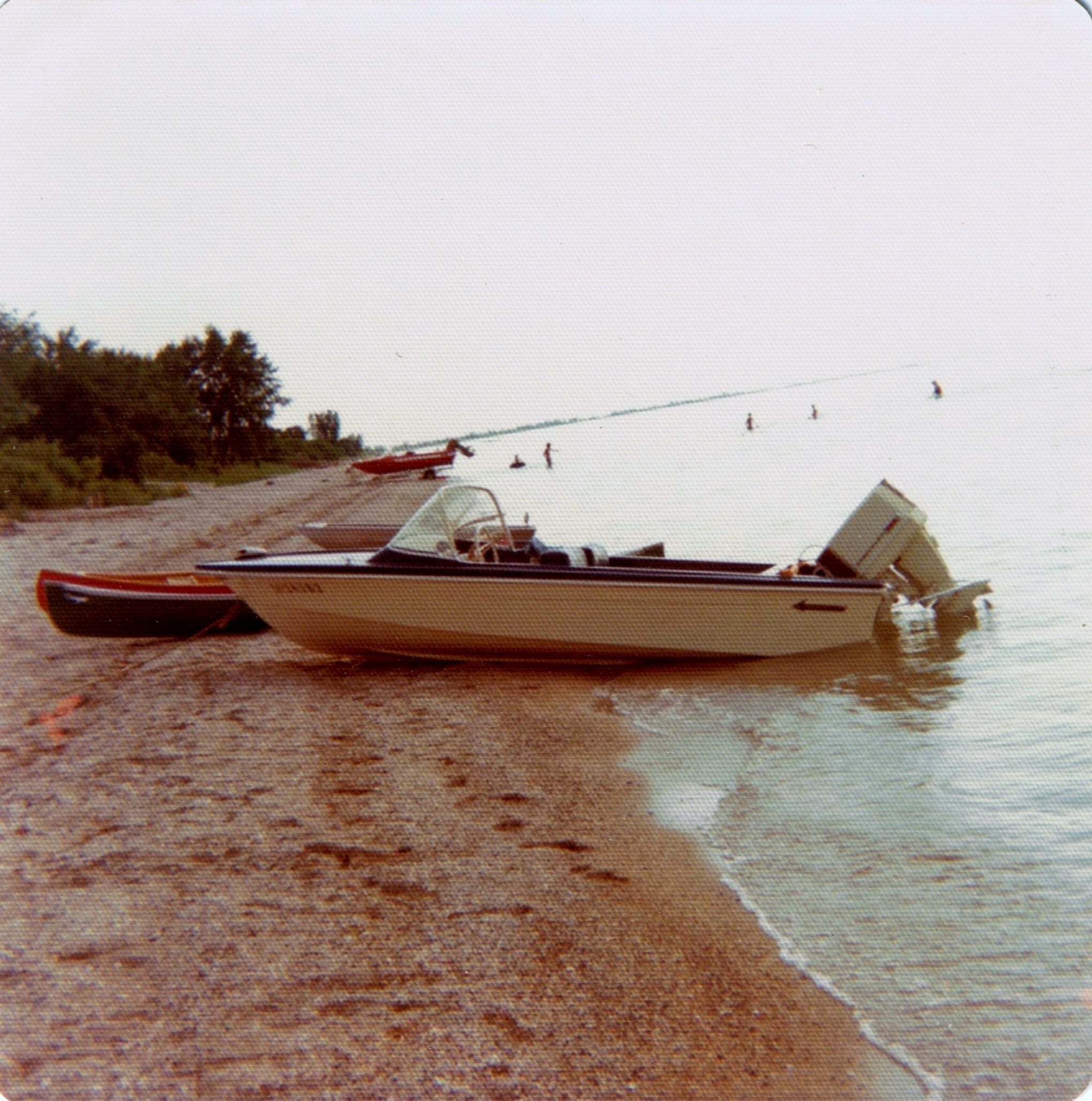
Twin Lakes Beach in the summer of 1975

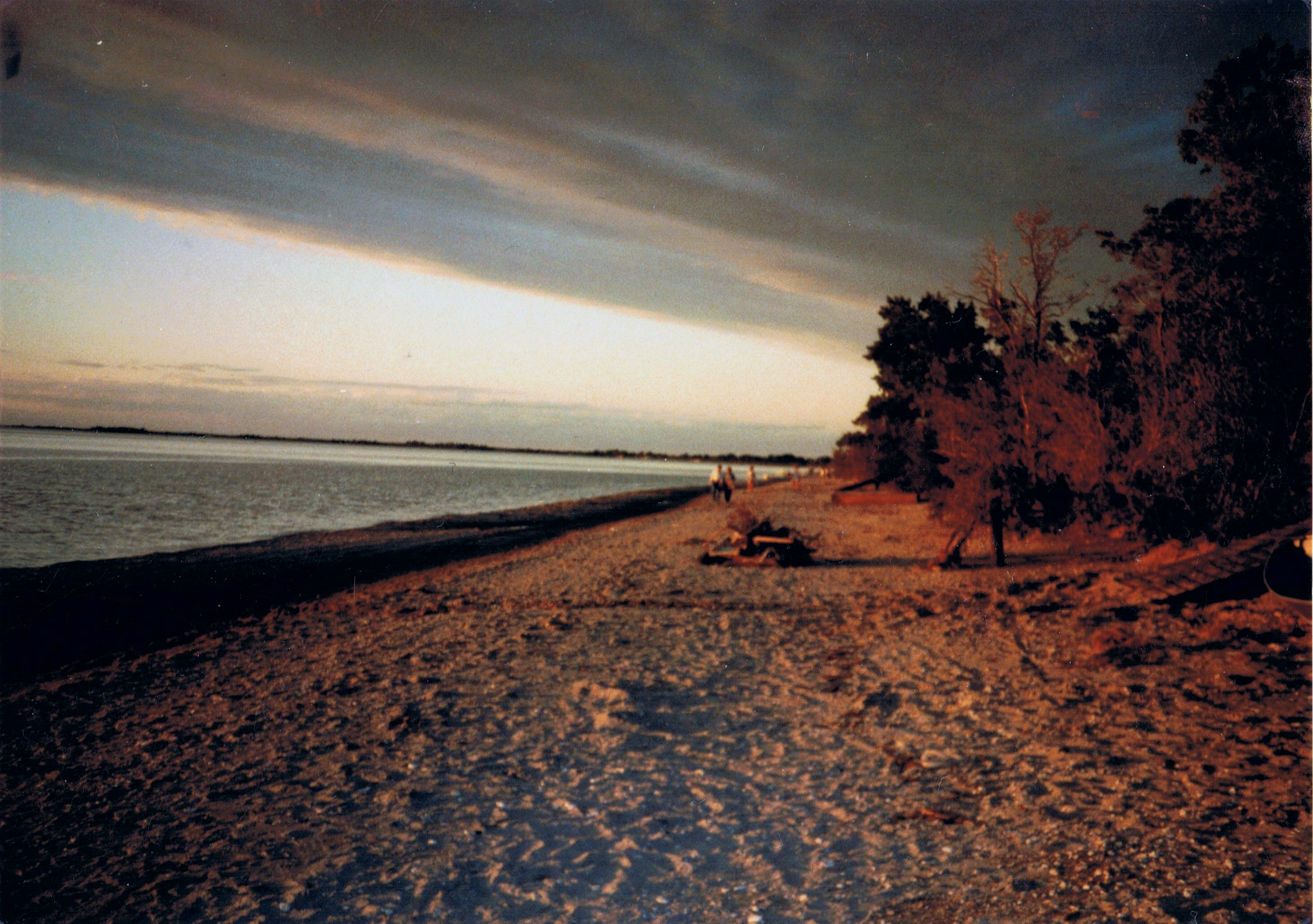
Twin Lakes Beach around 1980 before major erosion occurred. Note that there are no retaining walls.

The history of Twin Lakes Beach as a recreational area began around 1911 when Meindl built a hunting lodge, as hunting was the primary activity of the beach at the time. The lodge and others over time were used in the summer for fishing and holidays as well. About six or seven other medical doctors also used the area for hunting including Howden and Lambert. Over time Howden and Meindl acquired the land that comprises most of the present day beach from a local farmer with Howden acquiring over one mile of land in the Rural Municipality of Woodlands while Meindl acquired approximately 3 miles of land in the Rural Municipality of St. Laurent. It was after this time that the land was subdivided and many people began to purchase lakefront properties in the area initially mainly for summer homes and cottages, but also for permanent residences later on. Meindl donated 580 feet of beach front land for the local Metis people of St. Laurent for recreational use, which later became Meindl Park (French: Parc Meindl), named in his honour. Prior to the flooding of 2011, the highest recorded water level on Lake Manitoba was during the summer of 1955 when the water level gauge at nearby Delta Beach recorded 816.32 feet above sea level, although the readings were subject to wind setup due to the long fetch length of the lake to the north. During this year some residents were forced to boat to their properties as the road was underwater.

The desire to purchase a beachfront property has drastically increased even in the past decade, spiking the interests of many Manitoban citizens, and attracting them to the province's beautiful beaches and lakes. Cottage living has become popular amongst people who are retiring, wanting to enjoy outdoor leisure, or people wanting to enjoy the peaceful, yet exciting aspect of the beach or the lake, escaping the everyday buzz of urban living. The permanent population of Twin Lakes Beach is less than 50 residents year round but the population swells to over 1000 people at times during the summer as there are over 300 properties.

Twin Lakes Beach is one of the cleanest and best-preserved beaches in the province, not recognized by many people of Manitoba. Some cottage owners from Winnipeg and parts of the Interlake are familiar with the beach, however. The beach is located approximately one hour north of Winnipeg on Provincial Hwy 6, just a few kilometers off the highway.

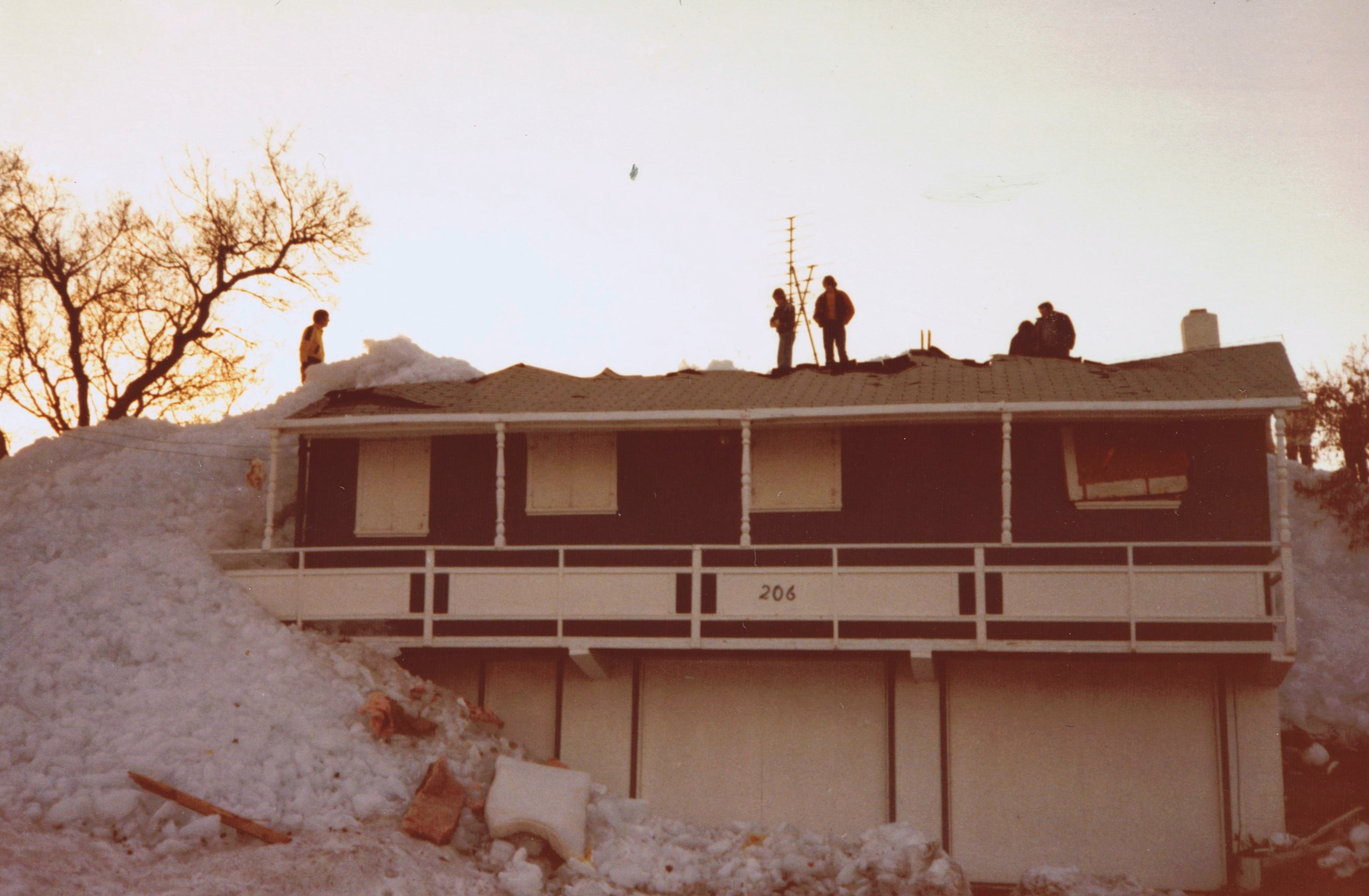
A cottage damaged by shoreline ice pile-up in 1981

The fact that the beach is actually located inside two rural municipalities (Rural Municipality of Woodlands and the Rural Municipality of St. Laurent), makes it difficult to understand the different by-laws issued within the lakefront community. Twin Beach Road, the main thoroughfare running to the community, splits in two directions near the lake, with one end heading north to the North section of the beach as Twin Lakes Beach Road North, with the other end continuing south through the main section of the beach as Twin Lakes Beach Road South. It also runs past MacKenzie Bay North and MacKenzie Bay South, which are two residential streets branching off of the main road. Sunshine operated a store from 1969 until closing in fall of 2003. A boat launch is now available where the store was once located.

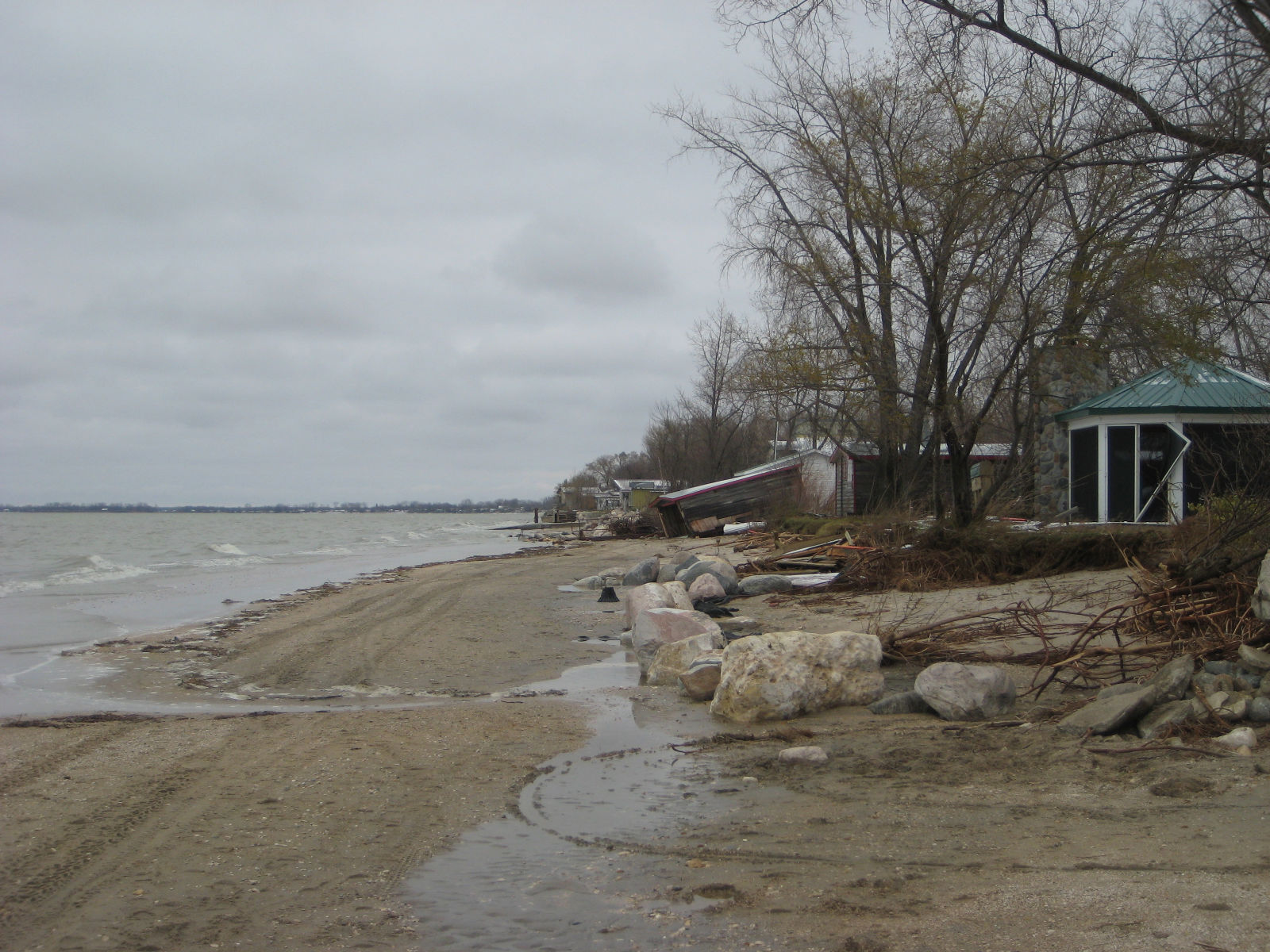
Twin Lakes Beach after the 2010 "weather bomb". This picture was taken from approximately the same place as the 1980s picture. Note how much beach has been lost as retaining walls in the distance marked the approximate beginning of the old beach.

The Twin Lakes Beach Association was formed and founded in 1955, the same year as the flooding, to discuss current issues and problems in and around the beach as well as provide representation of the cottagers in the Rural Municipalities of Woodlands and St. Laurent to discuss local issues well as representation at the provincial level to discuss issues such as the lake level.

Twin Lakes Beach was once a wide beach, wide enough in fact that cars and off-road vehicles were able to drive on it prompting the Rural Municipality of St. Laurent to pass a by-law in 1987 prohibiting the operation of off-road vehicle on the beaches within the municipality from May 1 to October 15. In more recent years the width of the beach has been reduced in many areas due to a number of factors. According to some residents they have lost as much as 100 feet (30 m) of beach and property combined. One factor is that Manitoba is currently experiencing a wet cycle which is causing lakes all across the province to experience high levels, such as the nearby Shoal Lakes which have now become a single lake. There is also the fact that many cottagers have not allowed the natural vegetation to grow which traps the sand. The regulation of Lake Manitoba may also be a factor. The lake is to be regulated between 810.5–812.5 ft (247.0–247.7 m) above sea level. This involves holding up water at the Fairford Dam in times of low water. While this may benefit some industries and cottagers, in places like Twin Lakes Beach it does not allow the sand to build up dunes around vegetation as it would in a drought. Also, in times of high water on the Assiniboine River, the Portage Diversion is opened normally diverting up to 25,000 cu ft/s (710 m^{3}/s), which is the designed channel capacity, of water into the lake that would otherwise be directed towards Winnipeg and the Red River. This has in the past resulted in an increase in lake levels in which the most evident case was during the 1976 flood on the Assiniboine River (1,420,000 acre-feet (1.75 km^{3}) of water diverted, 1.22 feet (0.37 m) direct rise in water levels). This was passed in terms of volume of water in 2011 as the Portage Diversion took on up to 34,804 cu ft/s (985.5 m^{3}/s) in a desperate attempt to prevent major flooding downstream. Also in 2011, the duration of use of the Portage Diversion was longer than ever before in as it was in operation from April 6 to August 5 running for a total of 122 days due to continued precipitation in the spring and into the summer.

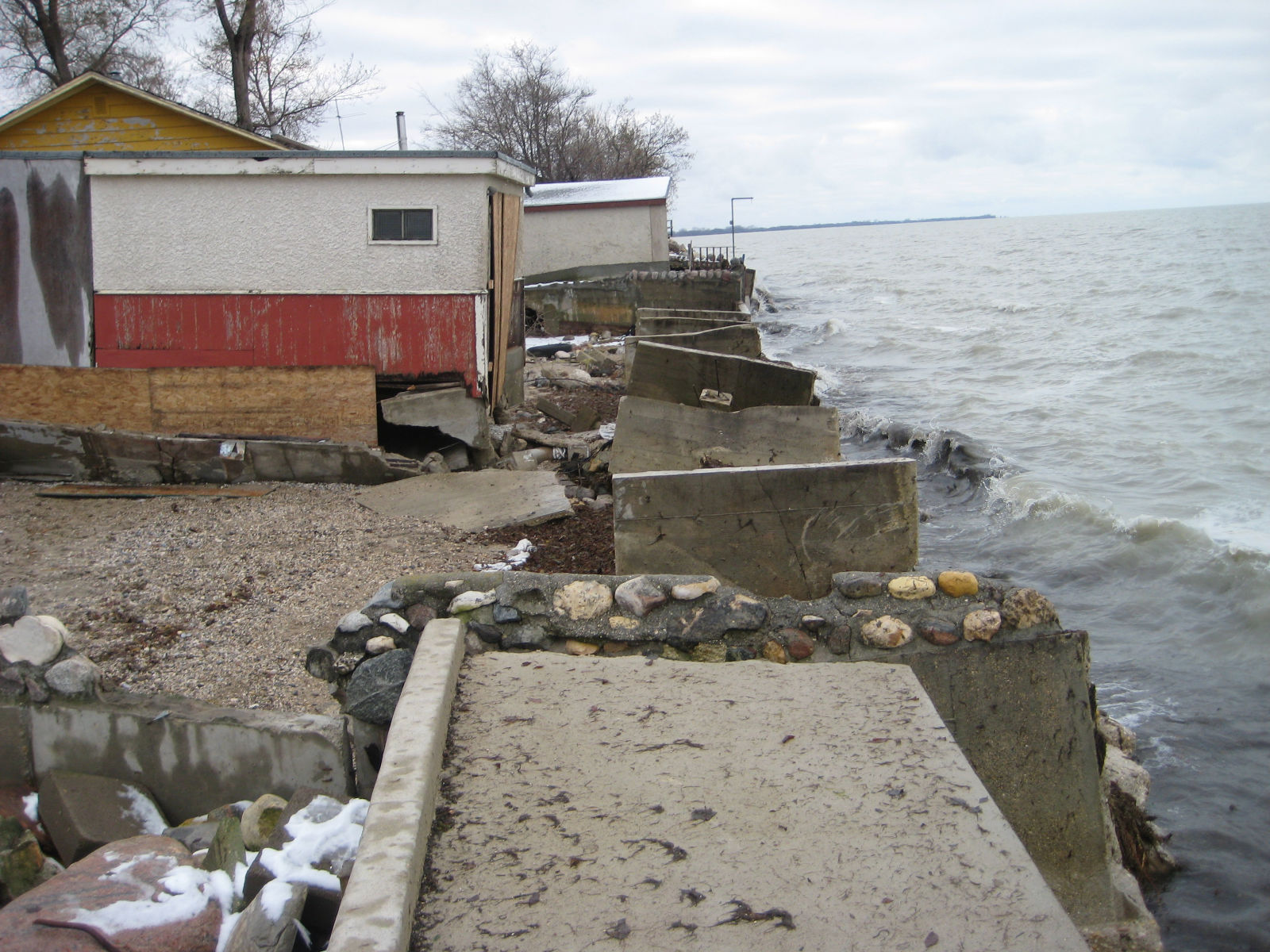
Retaining walls built to prevent erosion

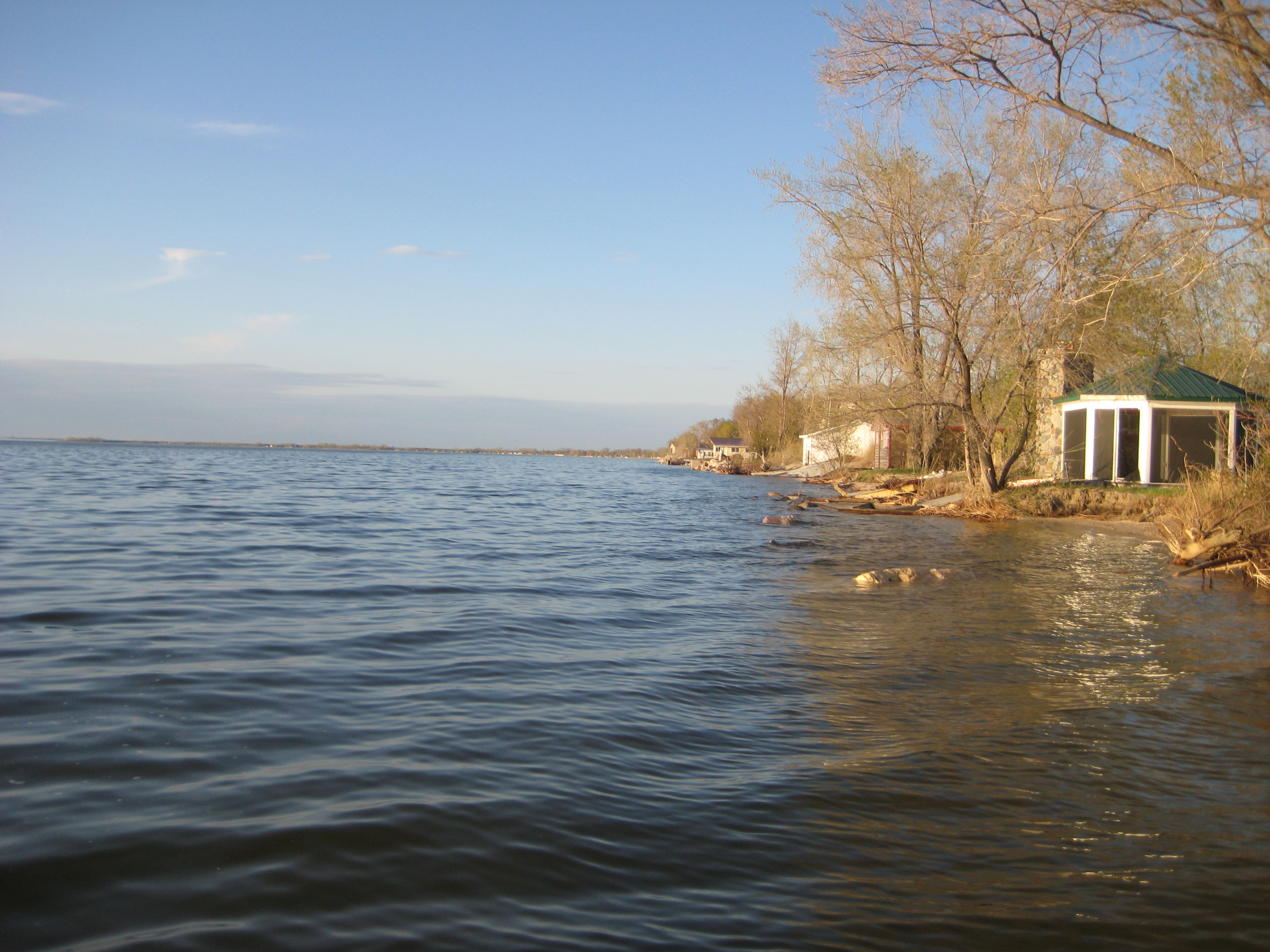
Twin Lakes Beach in May during the 2011 flooding. This picture was taken from approximately the same place from the last two pictures. Note the rocks in the water.

After closing on August 5, just under 4,700,000 acre-feet (5.8 km^{3}) (4.1 feet (1.2 m) rise) of water was directed toward Lake Manitoba rather than Winnipeg and the Red River, this number being more than three times the volume of the 1976 flood. After considering the fact that without the existence of the Portage Diversion, some water would flow into Lake Manitoba near Delta Beach through oxbow lakes and channels which were at one time the original channels of the Assiniboine River when it flowed to Lake Manitoba naturally around 2000 years ago, it is estimated that the Portage Diversion contributed to at least 3 feet (0.91 m) of a rise in water levels on Lake Manitoba, accounting for most of the rise of the lake. The volume of water diverted through the Portage Diversion in 2011 dwarfs the annual normal contributions of the two major tributaries of Lake Manitoba as the Waterhen and Whitemud Rivers contribute 1,900,000 acre-feet (2.3 km^{3}) and 149,000 acre-feet (184,000,000 m^{3}) respectively on average to the lake, although the contributions of these two rivers are higher in 2011 as there has been above average precipitation in the watersheds of Lake Manitoba's major tributaries. Even when average precipitation of about 1,800,000 acre-feet (2.2 km^{3}) and average local flows of about 108,000 acre-feet (133,000,000 m^{3}) are added to inflows, the expected total normal inflows would still be less than the roughly 4,700,000 acre-feet (5.8 km^{3}) that the Portage Diversion contributed by the end of the flood season in 2011 when it ceased operation on August 5.

Twin Lakes Beach has been the recipient of many storms causing shoreline erosion, flooding and property damage. Most notably are the storms of the fall of 1999, especially the storm on November 1 , as well as the fall of 2010 "weather bomb" both of which involved wind gusts of over 100 km/h and high winds for an extended period of time with the result being a shift in the lake of water from the north basin of Lake Manitoba to the south basin of the lake and large waves. Both storms resulted in considerable shoreline erosion, property damage, and some flooding. The 1999 storm caused an estimated $1 million in damage and was a catalyst for establishing new regulation of lake levels. Also in 1981 and 1992 cottages were destroyed as a result of shoreline ice pile-up. On July 29, 2012, a thunderstorm occurred at Twin Lakes Beach causing widespread damage to property including complete destruction of homes due to heavy rain, hail, and plow winds with gusts up to 150 km/h recorded on radar.

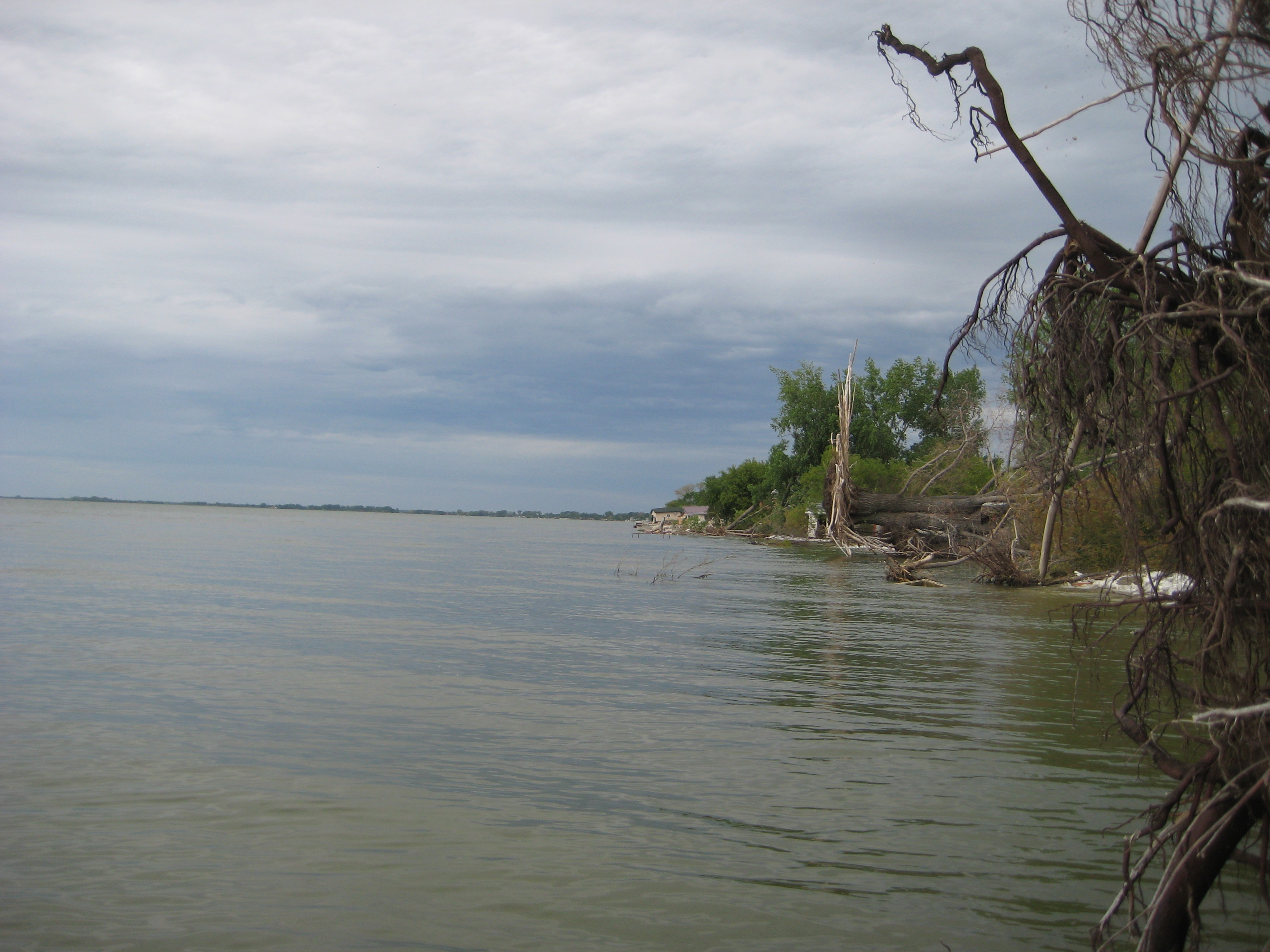
Twin Lakes Beach in July during the 2011 flooding after multiple storms. This picture was taken from approximately the same place from the last few pictures. Note the missing and damaged buildings as well as the damaged trees and shoreline.

== Climate ==
Twin Lakes Beach experiences a humid continental climate (Köppen Dfb) with warm to hot summers and cold windy winters. The climate is also influenced by Lake Manitoba. Due to the fact that Twin Lakes Beach lies on its shores, the community experiences temperature moderation during the ice-free months of year, and thus has reduced diurnal temperature variation during these months, resulting in cooler high temperatures in the summer, but also warmer nighttime lows in the summer and fall compared to nearby locations. In the spring, when the ice has not yet melted, any wind off the lake can also depress temperatures compared to nearby locations. Comparison with relatively nearby weather stations located off of the lake such as Lundar, Manitoba to the north and Marquette, Manitoba to the southeast illustrates the moderation provided by Lake Manitoba. In the fall and early winter before freeze-up Twin Lakes Beach also experiences periodic lake-effect snow. Wind coming off the lake also tends to be stronger than nearby locations due to less resistance, and this can lead to extreme windchills and snow drifts in the winter. Data is from Oak Point located about 20 kilometres (12 mi) to the north.

Climate data for Oak Point, Manitoba (1994-2020)
Month	Jan	Feb	Mar	Apr	May	Jun	Jul	Aug	Sep	Oct	Nov	Dec	Year
Mean daily maximum °C (°F)	−12.1 (10.2)	−9.9 (14.2)	−2.9 (26.8)	6.5 (43.7)	14.8 (58.6)	21.2 (70.2)	24.1 (75.4)	23.3 (73.9)	17.6 (63.7)	8.5 (47.3)	−1.1 (30.0)	−8.8 (16.2)	6.8 (44.2)
Mean daily minimum °C (°F)	−21.1 (−6.0)	−20.1 (−4.2)	−13.1 (8.4)	−3.5 (25.7)	4.5 (40.1)	11.9 (53.4)	14.9 (58.8)	13.4 (56.1)	8.4 (47.1)	1.1 (34.0)	−7.7 (18.1)	−16.7 (1.9)	−2.3 (27.8)
Source: Environment Canada

Data is also provided from Delta Beach located about 30 kilometres (19 mi) to the south-west.

Climate data for Delta Marsh CS (1981-2010)
Month	Jan	Feb	Mar	Apr	May	Jun	Jul	Aug	Sep	Oct	Nov	Dec	Year
Record high °C (°F)	7.5 (45.5)	11.5 (52.7)	18.3 (64.9)	34 (93)	37.5 (99.5)	37 (99)	36 (97)	37.5 (99.5)	35 (95)	31 (88)	22.8 (73.0)	11.1 (52.0)	37.5 (99.5)
Mean daily maximum °C (°F)	−10.7 (12.7)	−7.6 (18.3)	−0.8 (30.6)	8.6 (47.5)	16.8 (62.2)	22.4 (72.3)	25.1 (77.2)	24.2 (75.6)	18.2 (64.8)	10.4 (50.7)	−0.2 (31.6)	−8.1 (17.4)	8.2 (46.8)
Daily mean °C (°F)	−16.2 (2.8)	−13.6 (7.5)	−6.4 (20.5)	2.9 (37.2)	10.9 (51.6)	16.8 (62.2)	19.3 (66.7)	18.1 (64.6)	12.3 (54.1)	4.9 (40.8)	−4.9 (23.2)	−13.0 (8.6)	2.6 (36.7)
Mean daily minimum °C (°F)	−21.7 (−7.1)	−19.4 (−2.9)	−11.9 (10.6)	−2.9 (26.8)	4.9 (40.8)	11.2 (52.2)	13.5 (56.3)	11.9 (53.4)	6.3 (43.3)	−0.7 (30.7)	−9.5 (14.9)	−17.8 (0.0)	−3.0 (26.6)
Record low °C (°F)	−41 (−42)	−41.5 (−42.7)	−36.7 (−34.1)	−29.5 (−21.1)	−8.5 (16.7)	−1 (30)	4.5 (40.1)	−0.5 (31.1)	−7.1 (19.2)	−20.5 (−4.9)	−36 (−33)	−37.2 (−35.0)	−41.5 (−42.7)
Average precipitation mm (inches)	22.3 (0.88)	16.0 (0.63)	27.3 (1.07)	31.9 (1.26)	57.3 (2.26)	86.4 (3.40)	76.6 (3.02)	59.8 (2.35)	50.4 (1.98)	38.1 (1.50)	31.3 (1.23)	28.4 (1.12)	525.7 (20.70)
Source: Environment Canada

== 2011 Flooding ==
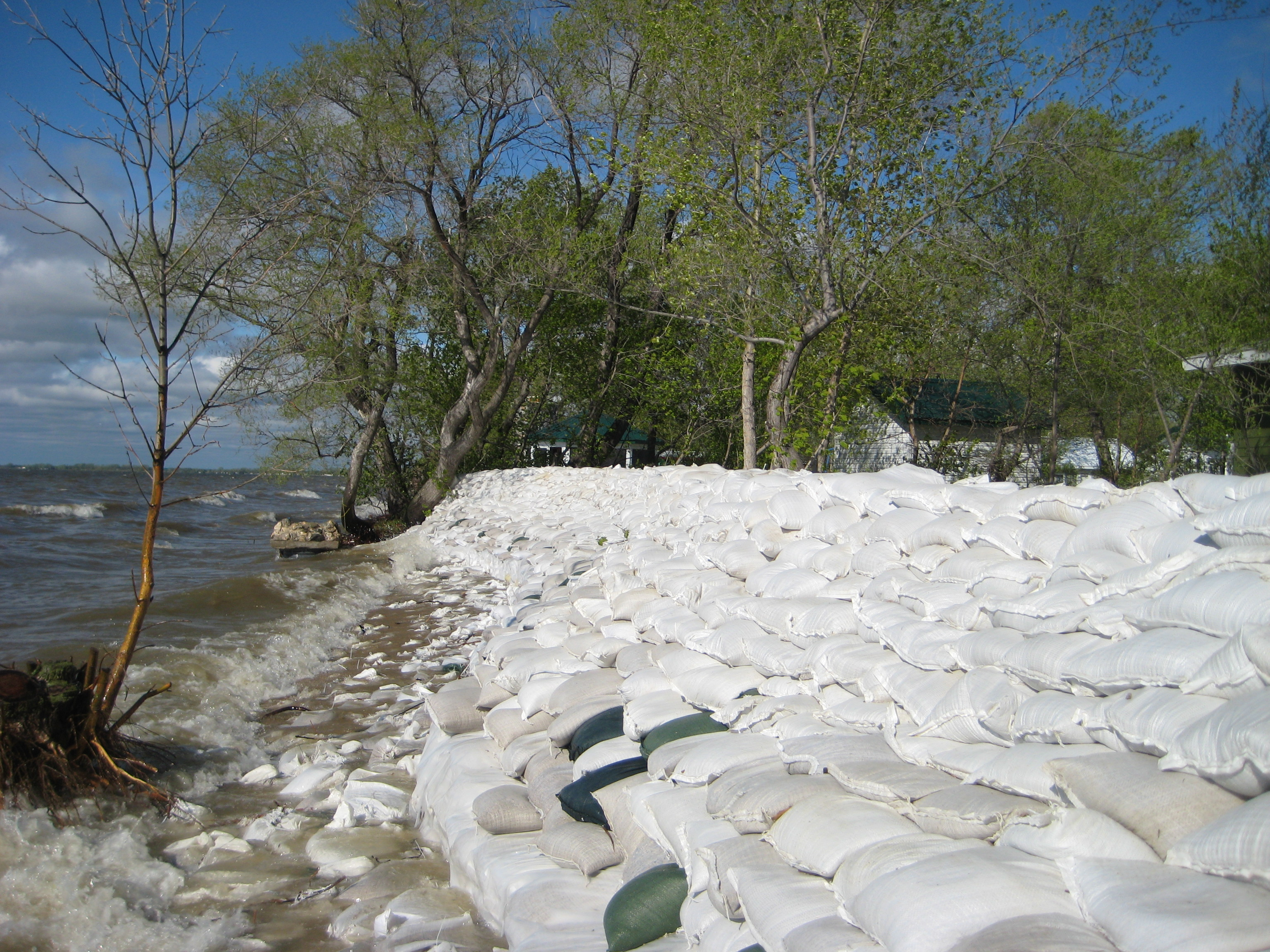
A sandbag wall built to prevent erosion, wave damage and flooding

As a result of a wet year Manitoba Water Stewardship forecasted the lake to reach a level of 814 feet (248 m) above sea level. However, the forecast was revised upwards numerous times due to precipitation and the extended use of the Portage Diversion to an eventual predicted peak as high as 817.81 feet (249.27 m) above sea level, well above the regulated range as well as the flood stage of 814 feet (248 m) above sea level, at the end of July. This was higher than 1955, prior to regulation, when the lake reached 816.25 feet (248.79 m) above sea level at Steep Rock. There is however, evidence that the lake exceeded 817.0 feet (249.0 m) above sea level in 1882 due to major floods on the Assiniboine River for two consecutive years in 1881 and 1882 causing river water to flow into Lake Manitoba, some of which in turn flowed out of the lake from the southeast corner and back into the Assiniboine River. Due to the topography of the land to the south of the lake, this could have only happened if the lake had in fact exceeded 817.0 feet (249.0 m) above sea level.

As a result of the record or near-record low precipitation levels combined with above average temperatures for the month of July, the lake peaked at a calculated wind eliminated level of 817.15 feet (249.07 m) for a period of time in mid to late July. However, according to Government flood sheets, Lake Manitoba peaked at 817.7 feet (249.2 m) at the Westbourne gauge and 817.5 feet (249.2 m) at the less variable Steep Rock gauge respectively. The flooding led to serious problems to cottagers who had already tried to prevent erosion and property damage through such methods as retaining walls, natural vegetation, rocks and rock cages, and some even resorted to moving their cottages back. These problems were not just localized to Twin Lakes Beach and also occurred on many parts of the lake. According to the Government of Manitoba Water Stewardship department, many areas around Twin Lakes Beach are not even above 814 feet (248 m) above sea level according to forecasted lake inundation maps released. This led to major flooding in the area from the flooded Lake Francis from behind, as well as damage due to high winds, waves, and storms. A State of Emergency was declared in Woodlands and St. Laurent and cattle around the lake were evacuated. A sandbagging machine was assembled in St. Laurent and produced sandbags for use by cottagers and residents in both Woodlands and St. Laurent. Sandbags were also trucked in from the surplus stock from Winnipeg.

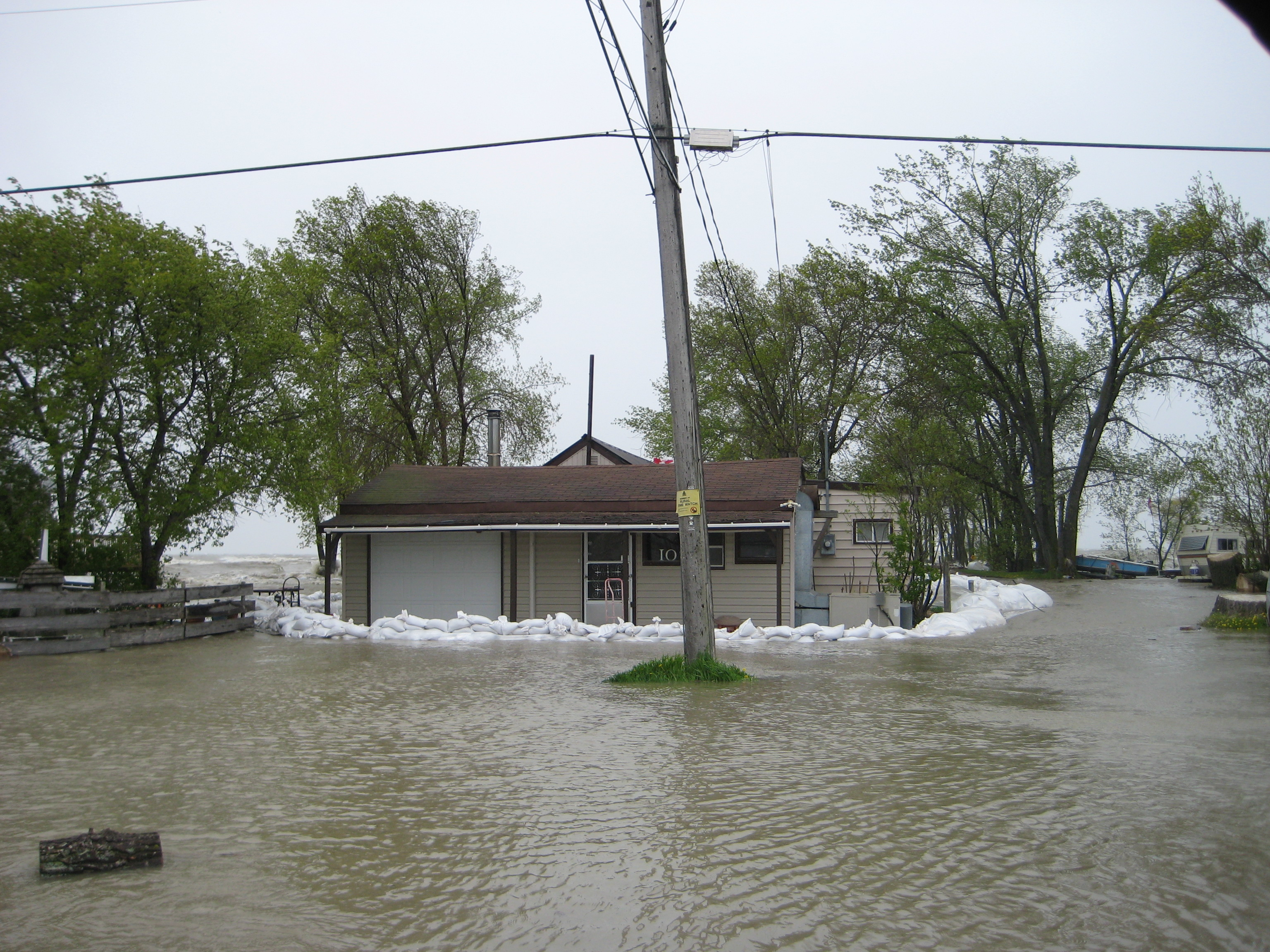
Twin Lakes Beach Road South near Sunshine Beach Campground during the May 31, 2011 storm

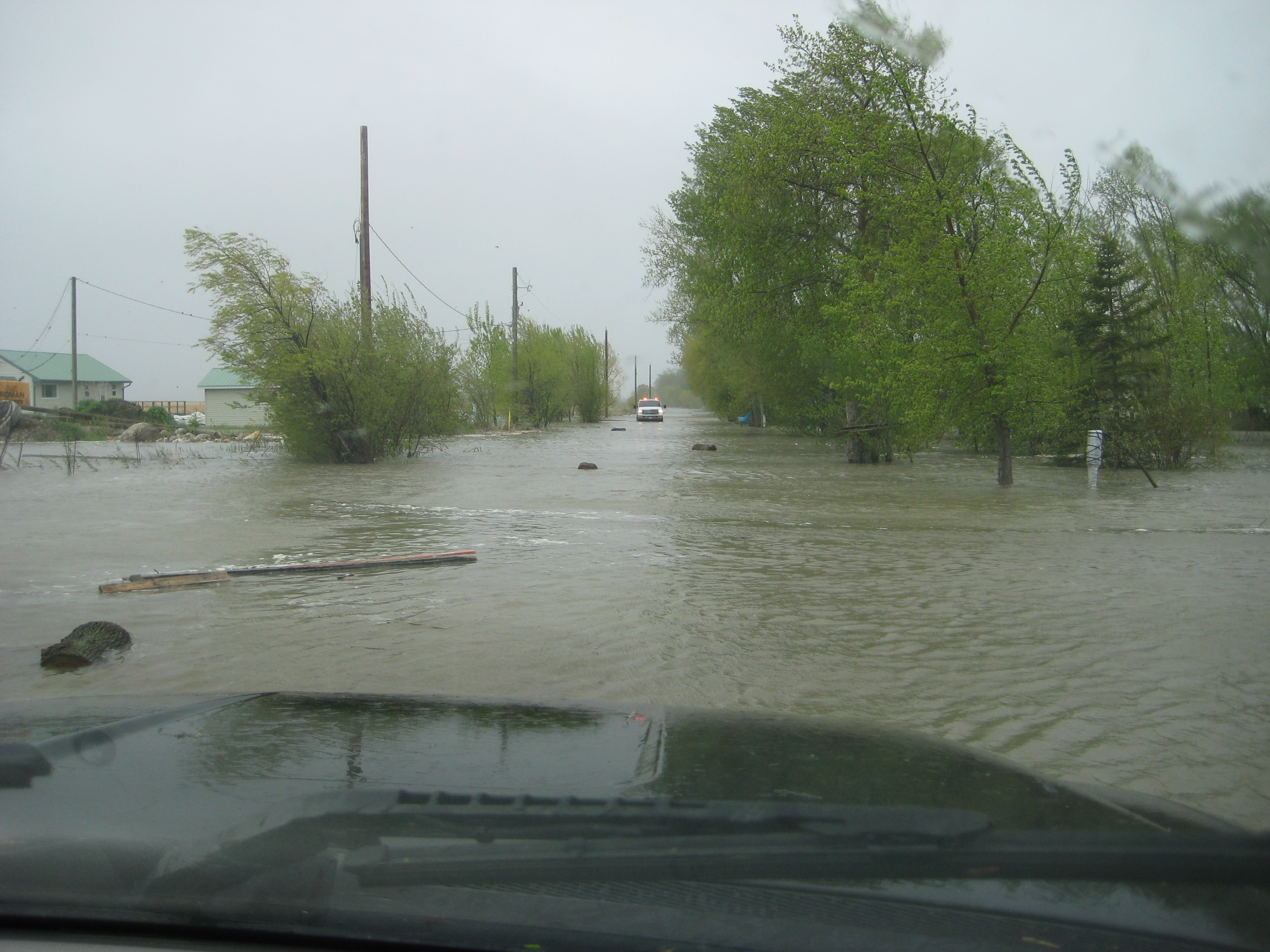
Water flowing across Twin Lakes Beach Road South during the May 31, 2011 storm

On May 31 , strong winds from the northwest which reached at times over 100 km/h occurred on Lake Manitoba, causing waves as high as 7 feet (2.1 m) which resulted in major flooding at Twin Lakes Beach and the surrounding beaches such as Laurentia Beach and Sandpiper Beach, as well as other locations on the lake including Delta Beach and St. Ambroise. The strong wind caused water from the north basin of Lake Manitoba to transfer to the south basin causing lake to surge (seiche effect) from 816.29 feet (248.81 m) above sea level in the morning to an estimated level of 820.37 feet (250.05 m) above sea level, a rise of over 4 feet (1.2 m). The result was overland flooding occurring on property and roads as well as damage to residences. Mandatory evacuations were ordered by the Rural Municipalities of Woodlands and St. Laurent to all cottagers and permanent residents on Twin Lakes Beach. Many cottages and homes were damaged and destroyed as a result of the storm. While the community remained under mandatory evacuation orders, structural experts were brought into the Twin Lakes Beach area to inspect every building on each property to assess the structural integrity of them and determine whether or not each building was structurally sound, and whether or not residents would be able to enter their homes and cottages. Buildings were rated on a scale of level of destruction from 1 to 4 with 4 being the worst, meaning that the building cannot be rehabilitated, cannot be entered, and must be demolished.

In some of the more northern properties of Twin Lakes Beach, beginning on the weekend of June 11, including all of Twin Lakes Beach North and some of Twin Lakes Beach South, residents were allowed to return if they had vehicles that were high riding and were all wheel drive, but for most residences including all of the Woodlands part, residents and cottagers were not allowed entry.

The Manitoba Urban Search and Rescue Team (USAR) was deployed to Twin Lakes Beach beginning Friday June 17, 2011 to help residents and cottagers safely access their residences to retrieve important possessions by stabilizing damaged buildings. Flex-Track vehicles from Manitoba Hydro were brought into use as transportation on the flooded road. USAR was stationed out of St. Laurent. USAR had planned to stabilize many of the damaged residences, but the damage was too extensive along the beach and left after a few weeks.

As much of the main roads on both the north and south parts of Twin Lakes Beach were under water, residents were also escorted to their residences using a pontoon boat, as well as a barge brought in from the Canadian Coast Guard. The construction of the entire sections of Twin Beach Road North and South in both Woodlands and St. Laurent was completed on August 24 to a level no lower than 818.5 feet (249.5 m) above sea level.

Beginning in early September with construction running into October, TITANTubes (sometimes referred to as geotubes or geotextile tubes) manufactured by Flint Industries(USA) were installed along most of the shoreline of the section of the beach in the Rural Municipality of Woodlands. Woodlands was given a $2 million grant from the province of Manitoba to complete the wave breaker trial project. The geotextile tubes were built to a level of 824 feet (251 m) above sea level to provide protection against waves and storm surges often seen on the lake. Geotextile tubes were also installed on parts of Delta Beach as well as nearby Sandpiper Beach. The goal was to have completed 17 kilometres (11 mi) of Geotextile tubes, but only 3.8 kilometres (2.4 mi) were installed around the lake. This includes the 6,614 feet (2,016 m) installed along Twin Lakes Beach.

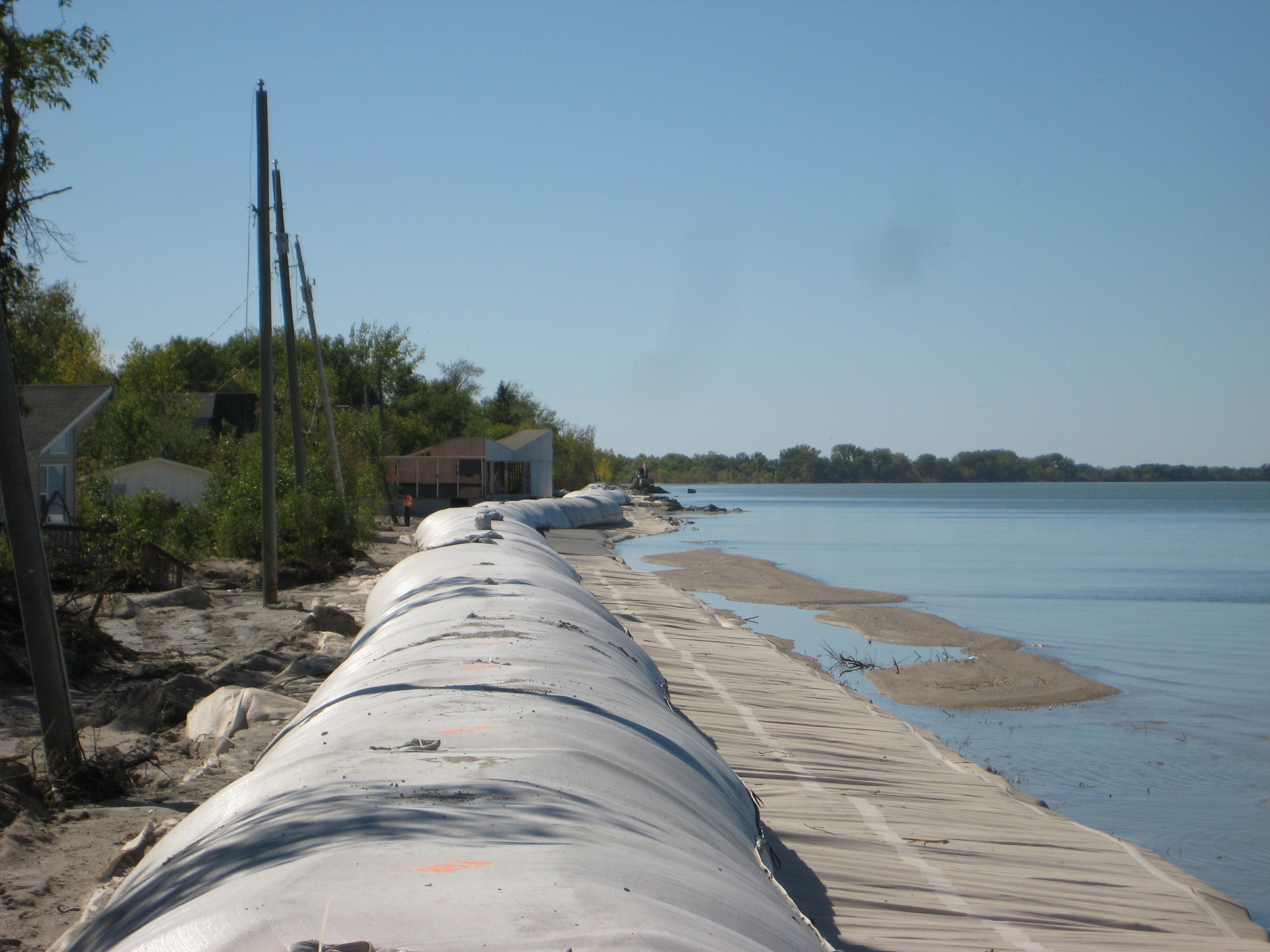
Geotextile tubes along the shores of Twin Lakes Beach

Also in the fall, demolition crews were brought in to demolish those residences in Woodlands that were classified as Level 4 as a result of the May 31 and subsequent storms. In total there were approximately 25 residences demolished in the RM of Woodlands. The mandatory evacuation continued until December 31, 2011, when local state of emergencies for Woodlands and St. Laurent were not renewed. However, some residents who were fortunate to have little or no damage from the flooding were conditionally allowed to return to their residences on a permanent basis after meeting a defined criteria from their respective municipality beginning in late October or early November.

On November 1, 2011, the $100 million, 6.5 kilometres (4.0 mi) Lake St. Martin Emergency channel was opened to help lower the high flood waters on Lake St. Martin by flowing at rates as high as 9,000 cu ft/s (250 m^{3}/s). This in turn, allows the Fairford Dam to stay open at full capacity all winter rather than have reduced outflows from Lake Manitoba, which normally happens in the late fall as some of the gates are normally closed on Fairford. The channel allows this as it reduces the risk of frazil ice buildup on most of the Dauphin River and after the extended reach extension of the Emergency Channel is completed, the risk of ice jams along the entire Dauphin River will be reduced. With favourable conditions, the channel would help bring the chance of Lake Manitoba staying below the flood stage of the lake of 814 feet (248 m) above sea level up to 90%, but this is still higher than the desired level for Twin Lakes Beach of 810.5 feet (247.0 m) above sea level. Due to persistent high water levels on Lake Winnipegosis causing sustained high inflows into Lake Manitoba through the Waterhen River, there has been concern by residents and organizations over the effectiveness of the Emergency Channel in draining Lake Manitoba as it adds no additional outlet capacity from Lake Manitoba.

== Notable residents ==
- Craig Millar, former NHL player
