= Geotextile tube =

Tube-shaped bag used to form an artificial dune or levee

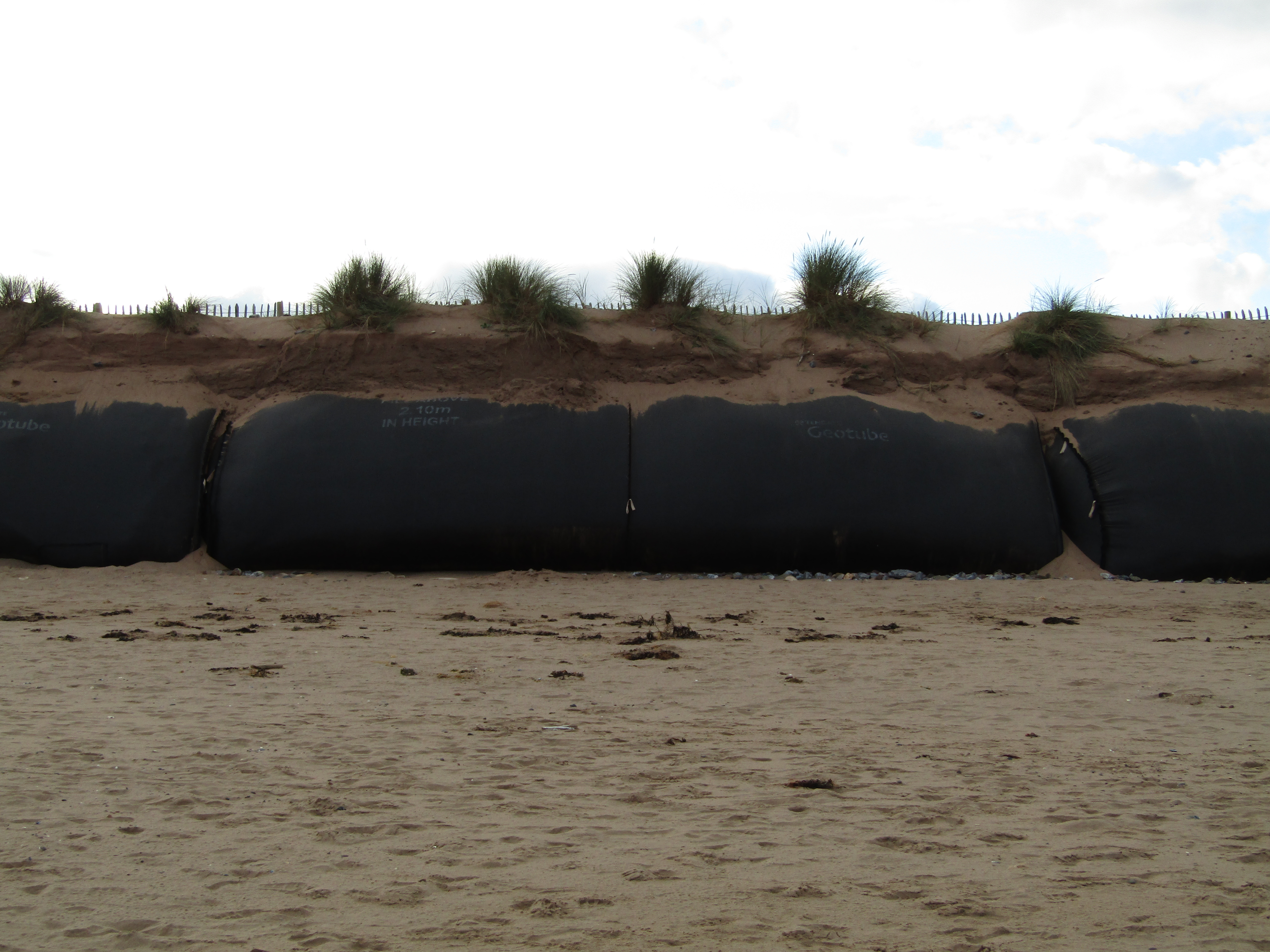
Geotextile tubes defend the dunes at Dawlish Warren in Devon, England.

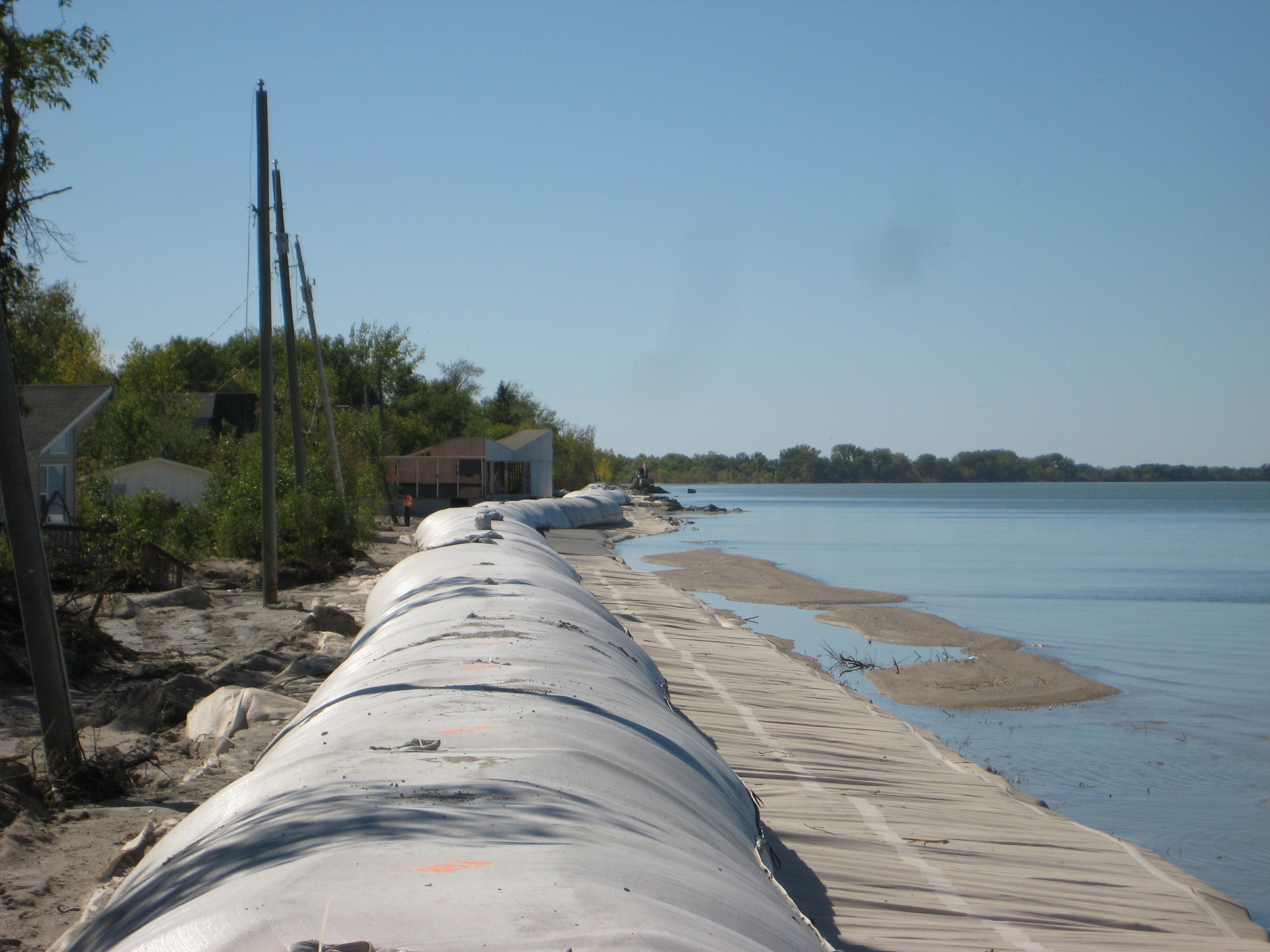
Geotextile tubes at Twin Lakes Beach, Manitoba.

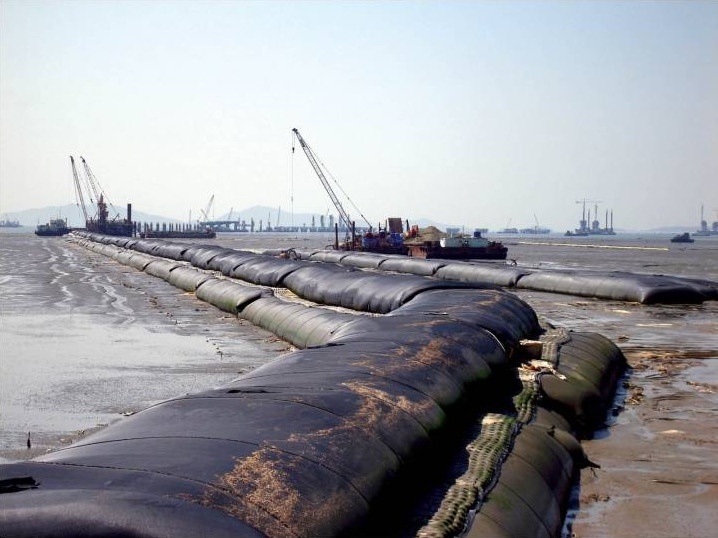
Geotextile tubes being filled with sand.

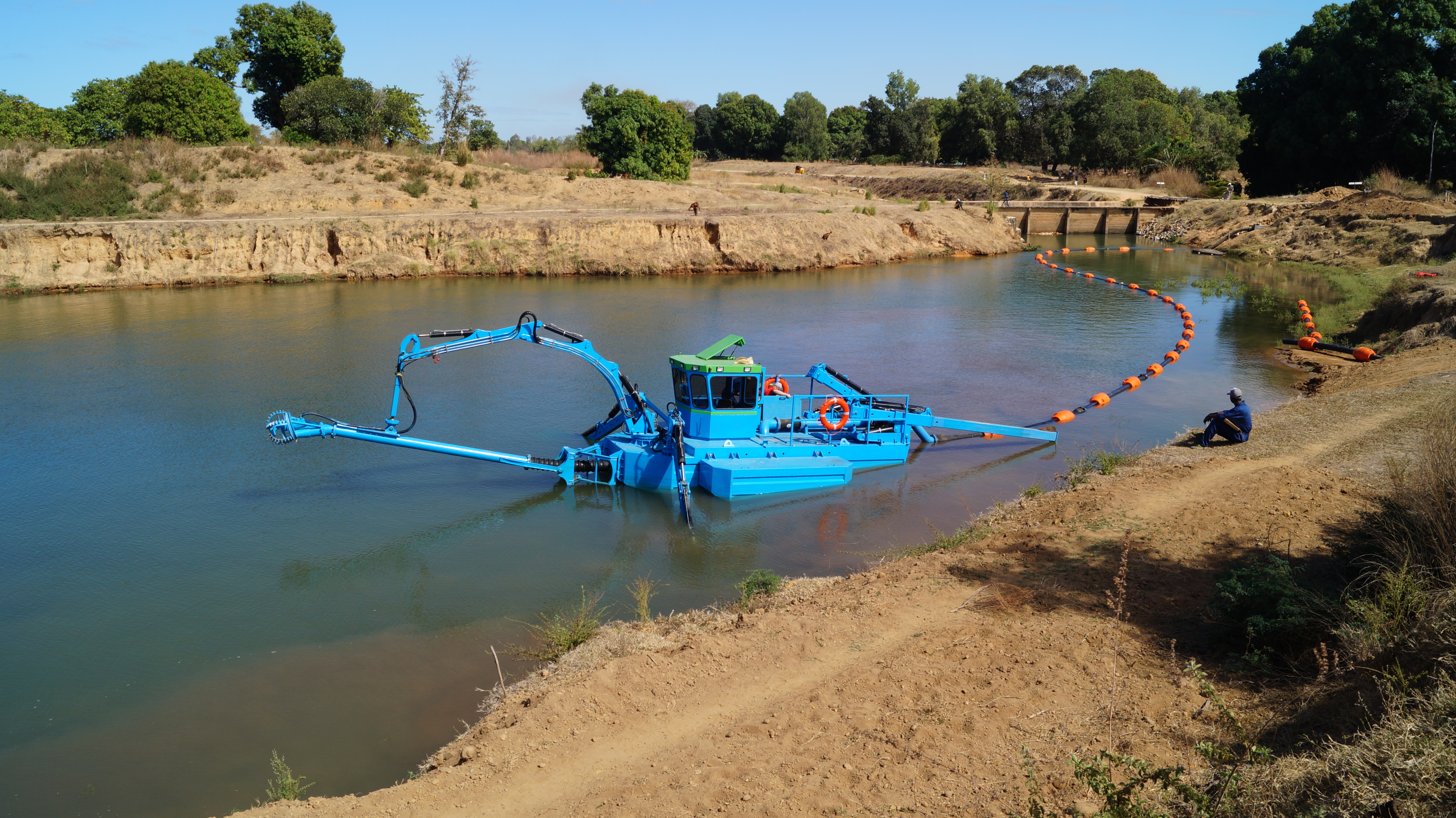
Amphibious dredge boat collecting sediment by using a cutting head, transporting it to geotubes

A geotextile tube is a large, tube-shaped bag made of porous, weather-resistant geotextile and filled with a sand slurry, to form an artificial coastal structure such as a breakwaters, dune or levee. Geotextile tubes are a component of the living shorelines approach to coastal management.

They are aligned with the shoreline to weaken wave energy and protect against coastal erosion. The tubes facilitate oyster reef development and create areas to dispose of new dredge material. Geotextile tubes are also installed for land reclamation and temporarily installed during the dewatering phase of a dredging operation.

Major manufacturers of geotextile tubes include Solmax's Geotube, based in Canada; Belgium's BontexGeo Group; and China's Best Materials Group. Geotextile tubes date back to hydraulic engineering in the 1950s.

If a geotextile tube is exposed to the elements, it can be vulnerable to bursting.

== Notable installations ==
- Grand Isle, Louisiana ("Burrito Levee")

== See also ==
- Breakwater (structure)
- Cellular confinement
- Groyne
