= Woodland Beach, Maryland =

Unincorporated community in Maryland, United States

- Unincorporated community
- Location within the state of Maryland Woodland Beach, Maryland (the United States)
- Coordinates: 38°55′56″N 76°33′12″W
- Country: United States
- State: Maryland
- County: Anne Arundel
- Time zone: UTC-5 (Eastern (EST))
  - Summer (DST): UTC-4 (EDT)

Woodland Beach is an unincorporated community in Anne Arundel County, Maryland, United States.

== History ==
The London Town Publik House was listed on the National Register of Historic Places in 1970.
