= South River, Maryland =

Unincorporated community in Maryland, United States

South River
- Unincorporated community
- Location within the state of Maryland South River (the United States)
- Coordinates: 38°54′11″N 76°33′38″W
- Country: United States
- State: Maryland
- County: Anne Arundel
- Time zone: UTC-5 (Eastern (EST))
  - Summer (DST): UTC-4 (EDT)

South River is an unincorporated community in Anne Arundel County, Maryland, United States. South River Club was listed on the National Register of Historic Places in 1969.

== See also ==
- South River Federation
