= South River (Maryland) =

Coordinates: 38°55′14″N 76°30′9″W

Location
- Country: United States
- State: Maryland
- Cities: Annapolis, South River, Riva, Edgewater, Mayo, Selby-on-the-Bay

Physical characteristics
- Source
  - location: Crownsville, Maryland
- Source confluence: North River
- Mouth: Chesapeake Bay
  - location: Thomas Point
  - elevation: 0 ft (0 m)

Basin features
- Tributaries
  - left: Broad Creek, Gingerville Creek, Church Creek, Crab Creek, Aberdeen Creek, Harness Creek, Duvall Creek
  - right: Flat Creek, Beards Creek, Warehouse Creek, Almshouse Creek, Glebe Bay, Selby Bay

The South River is a 10-mile-long (16 km) tributary of the Chesapeake Bay in Anne Arundel County, Maryland in the United States. It lies south of the Severn River, east of the Patuxent River, and north of the West River and Rhode River, and drains to the Chesapeake Bay.

Total watershed area is 66 square miles (170 km^{2})(including water surface), 56 square miles (150 km^{2}) (or 85%) of it land. From its headwaters in western Anne Arundel County in Crofton, the river enters the Chesapeake Bay south of the historic port city of Annapolis, hence the name South River. Its major non-tidal branches include the North River, which is the non-tidal portion of the South River, and Bacon Ridge Branch, which drains the area east of the North River. Their confluence is between Maryland Route 450 (Defense Highway) and US 50 (John Hanson Highway). Some of the creeks on its north shore drain highly developed portions of Annapolis, especially Church Creek, which drains much of the Parole and Annapolis Harbour shopping centers.

The navigable portion of the South River is crossed by two bridges, one carrying Maryland Route 2 (Solomons Island Road), known as the South River Bridge, and the other carrying Riva Road, known as the Riva Bridge. A bridge carrying US 50 crosses its upper tidal reaches.

== History ==
Although there are currently no major towns on the river other than Annapolis and Edgewater, a "lost town" called London Town (also known as Londontowne or Londontown) was established on the south shore of the river in 1683, and was once the county seat and a major port. It was located between Almshouse Creek (named because London Town's only surviving house was used as the county almshouse until 1965) and Glebe Bay, and across the river from Ferry Point (before the bridges were built, ferries to Annapolis ran between London Town and Ferry Point). The one surviving house, the William Brown house, built between 1758 and 1764, has been restored and is open to the public as part of Historic London Town and Gardens. Another historic structure near the South River, the well-known and frequently photographed Thomas Point Shoal Lighthouse, is just outside the mouth of the South River.

== See also ==
- List of rivers of Maryland
- South River Federation
