= Arundel Rivers =

Maryland environmental organization

Coordinates: 38°57′21″N 76°33′14″W

In 2019, Arundel Rivers was formed by joining South River Federation with the West Rhode Riverkeeper, Inc. Located in Edgewater, Maryland, USA, the Arundel Rivers Federation, Inc. is a grassroots organization of more than 500 members whose goal is to "preserve, protect and celebrate" the South River and its ecosystem through:

- monitoring and assessment
- education and enforcement
- large scale restoration
- outreach and promotion of responsible stewardship

Full-time staff includes the South, West, and Rhode RiverKeeper, who monitor and document the health of the rivers via weekly bacteria testing and water quality sampling from May through September.
