= Maryland Route 424 =

State highway in Maryland, United States

Maryland Route 424
- Davidsonville Road
- Maryland Route 424 highlighted in red

Route information
- Maintained by MDSHA
- Length: 8.24 mi (13.26 km)
- Existed: 1930–present

Major junctions
- South end: MD 214 in Davidsonville
- US 50 / US 301 near Davidsonville; MD 450 in Crofton
- North end: MD 3 in Crofton

Location
- Country: United States
- State: Maryland
- Counties: Anne Arundel

Highway system
- Maryland highway system; Interstate; US; State; Scenic Byways
← MD 423	→ MD 425

Maryland Route 424 (MD 424) is a state highway in the U.S. state of Maryland. Known as Davidsonville Road, the highway runs 8.24 miles (13.26 km) from MD 214 in Davidsonville north to MD 3 in Crofton. MD 424 connects U.S. Route 50 (US 50)/US 301 with the two communities in central Anne Arundel County. The highway was constructed from Davidsonville to what is now MD 450 in the late 1920s. MD 424 was extended to what is now MD 3 in the late 1940s. The highway's interchange with US 50 opened in the early 1950s when Route 50 was relocated between Bowie and Annapolis. MD 424 temporarily extended south to MD 2 in the early to mid-1950s and north to the Little Patuxent River in the 1970s and early 1980s.

== Route description ==
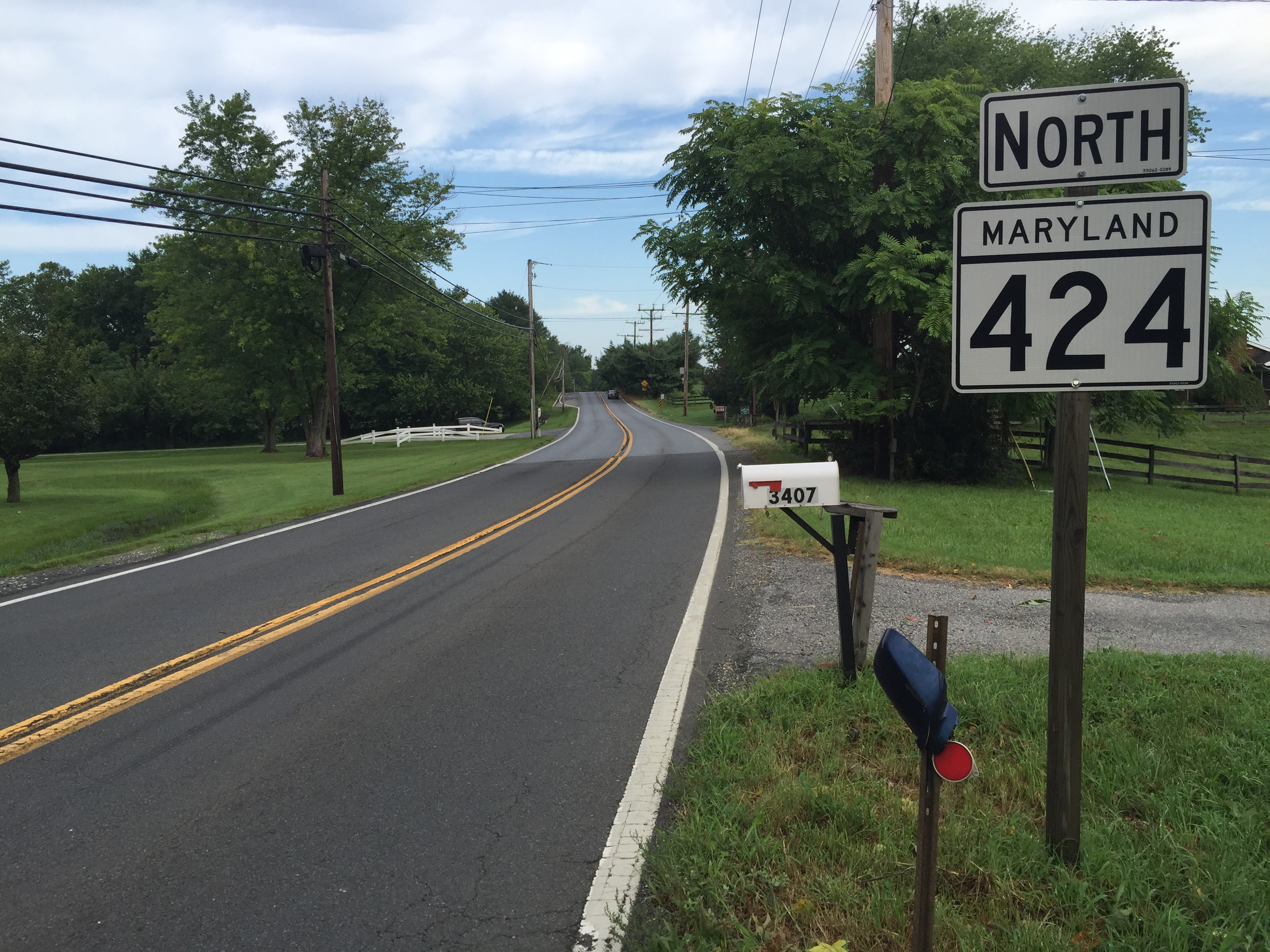
View towards the north, near the south end of MD 424 at MD 214 in Davidsonville

MD 424 begins at an intersection with MD 214 (Central Avenue) within the Davidsonville Historic District. The south leg of the intersection is county-maintained Birdsville Road. MD 424 heads northwest out of Davidsonville as a two-lane undivided road and passes to the east of the historic homes Mount Airy and Indian Range, which are located along Mount Airy Road. The highway curves north and intersects Governors Bridge Road, which heads west toward the historic one-lane Governor's Bridge across the Patuxent River. MD 424 veers northwest, expands to a four-lane divided highway, and has a four-ramp partial cloverleaf interchange with John Hanson Highway, a freeway that carries US 50/US 301 and unsigned Interstate 595. A park and ride lot serving MTA Maryland commuter buses is located at the southeast corner of this interchange. MD 424 reduces to two lanes, veers north, and passes to the west of the historic home Rosehill before intersecting MD 450 (Defense Highway) on the southeastern edge of Crofton. The highway passes by the historic home Linthicum Walks and along the northeastern edge of the planned community. MD 424 expands to a four-lane undivided highway at Riedel Road before reaching its northern terminus at MD 3 (Robert Crain Highway). The west leg of the intersection is Conway Road, a county highway that crosses the Little Patuxent River a short distance to the west.

MD 424 is a part of the National Highway System as a principal arterial from MD 450 north to MD 3 in Crofton.

== History ==
MD 424 was constructed as a 16-foot (4.9 m) wide gravel highway from what was then MD 254 (now MD 214) in Davidsonville north to US 50 (now MD 450) in 1929 and 1930. By 1934, the Maryland State Roads Commission recommended the highway be expanded to a width of 20 feet (6.1 m) for its whole length. Much of the highway was expanded from 16 to 24 feet (4.9 to 7.3 m) in 1944. MD 424 was extended northwest to US 301 (now MD 3) at a place called Conaways in 1949. The state highway's interchange with the Annapolis–Washington Expressway, which became part of US 50, was constructed between 1950 and 1952 concurrent with the portion of the freeway between Bowie and Parole.

The MD 424 designation was extended south along Birdsville Road to MD 2 in 1951 but truncated at Davidsonville by 1956. During that period, Birdsville Road was improved with a bituminous stabilized gravel surface in 1953 and 1954. Signage on MD 2 at Birdsville Road still reads "TO MD 424". MD 424 was extended north from MD 3 along Conway Road to the highway's bridge across the Little Patuxent River by 1978; the bridge itself was constructed in 1966. The highway's northern terminus returned to MD 3 by 1985. MD 424 was expanded to a divided highway when a pair of new bridges were constructed at its interchange with US 50 and US 301 in 1994. The highway was expanded to four lanes on its northernmost mile in Crofton by 1999.

== Junction list ==
The entire route is in Anne Arundel County.

Location	mi	km	Destinations	Notes
Davidsonville	0.00	0.00	MD 214 (Central Avenue) / Birdsville Road south – Largo, Edgewater	Southern terminus
	3.32	5.34	US 50 / US 301 (John Hanson Highway) – Bay Bridge, Annapolis, Washington, Richmond	US 50 Exit 16; US 50 and US 301 run concurrently with unsigned I-595
Crofton	5.85	9.41	MD 450 (Defense Highway) – Bowie, Annapolis	
Crofton	8.24	13.26	MD 3 (Robert Crain Highway) / Conway Road west – Bowie, Baltimore, Odenton	Northern terminus
1.000 mi = 1.609 km; 1.000 km = 0.621 mi
