= Wilglory Tanjong =

American businesswoman

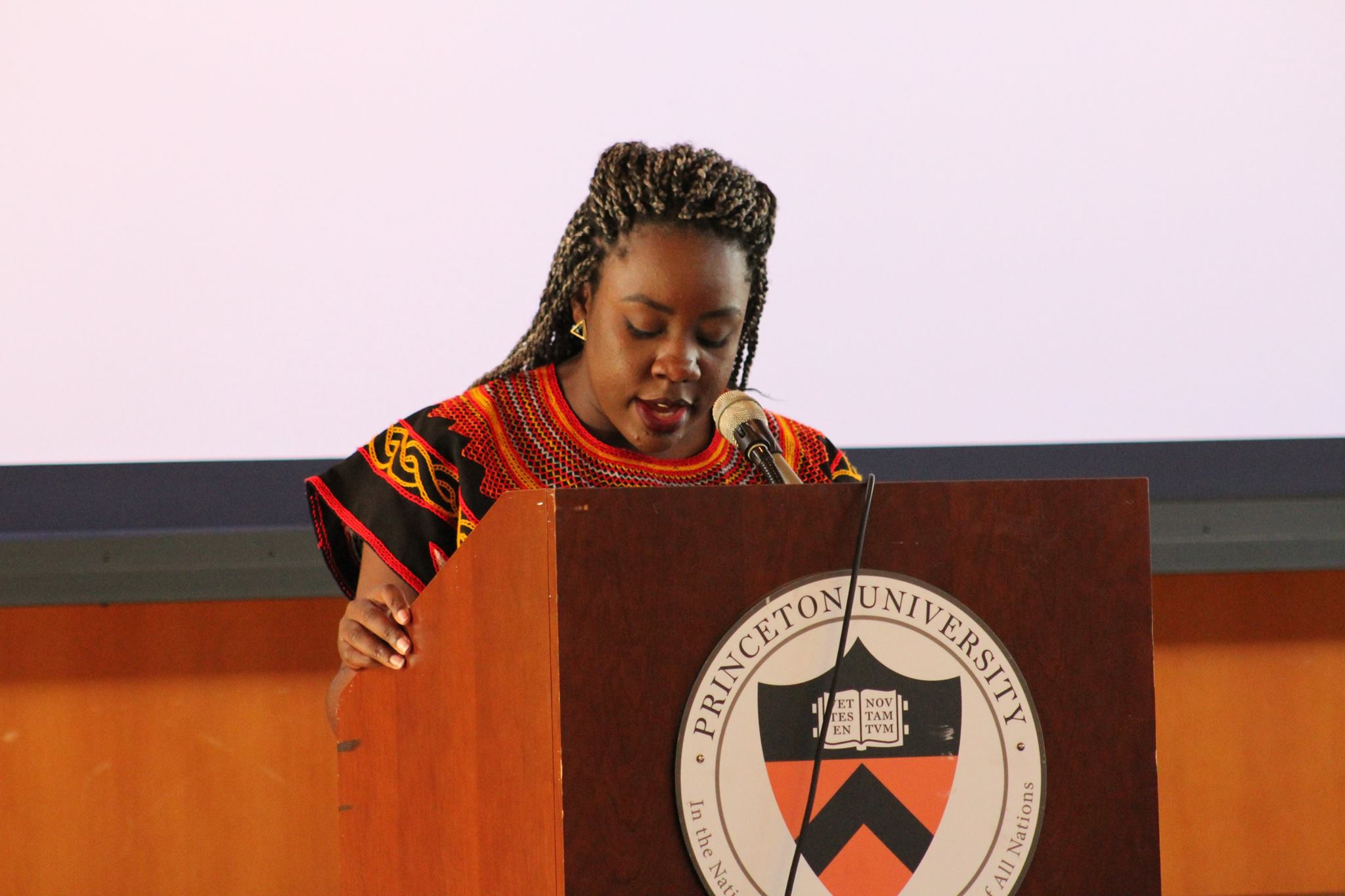
- Wilglory Tanjong speaking at the Okwele Conference.
- Born: Cameroon
- Education: Princeton University
- Website: www.linkedin.com/in/wilglory

Wilglory Tanjong is an American entrepreneur of Cameroonian descent. She is the founder of Anima Iris, a fashion handbag brand.

== Biography ==
Tanjong is from Cameroon and moved to Maryland at the age of two. She graduated from Arundel High School in Gambrills in 2014, and then from Princeton University in 2018. She later moved to Atlanta, Georgia where she took a position at a manufacturing and supply company. She left the company to travel around Africa for six months. During that time, she started a community of artisans who made handbags, jewelry and shoes. In February 2020, she launched Anima Iris, a fashion handbag brand.

Tanjong attends Wharton School of the University of Pennsylvania where she is a full-time student pursuing an MBA.
