= Whites Hall =

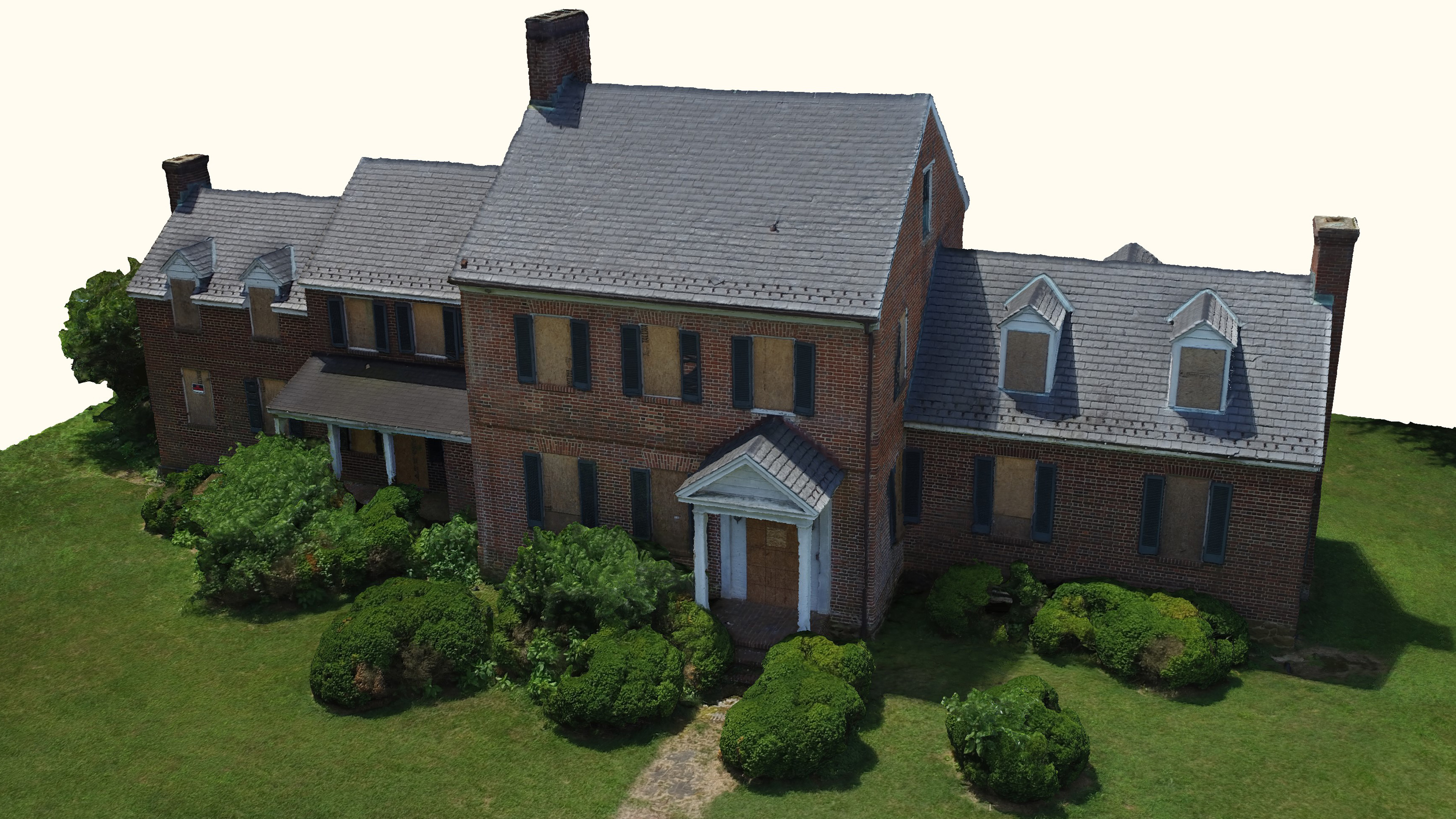
- Drone scan of Whites Hall by Preservation Maryland

- Location within Maryland Location within the United States
- 39°01′15″N 76°40′20″W
- Location: 2173 Johns Hopkins Road; Gambrills, Maryland 21054

History
- Built: 1784

Site notes
- Area: 13 acres (5.3 ha)
- Architectural style: Georgian Architecture
- Governing body: Private

Whites Hall, also referred to as Whiteshall or Whites Hall Farm, is the birthplace and boyhood home of Maryland native Johns Hopkins. Whites Hall is located in Gambrills, Maryland.

== History ==
Whites Hall was originally part of an 1,800-acre land grant to Colonel Jerome White in 1665. The house itself was constructed between 1780 and 1784. The home was designed as a two-story, brick side passage double pile plan dwelling, and was listed on the Maryland Historic Site inventory in 1969.

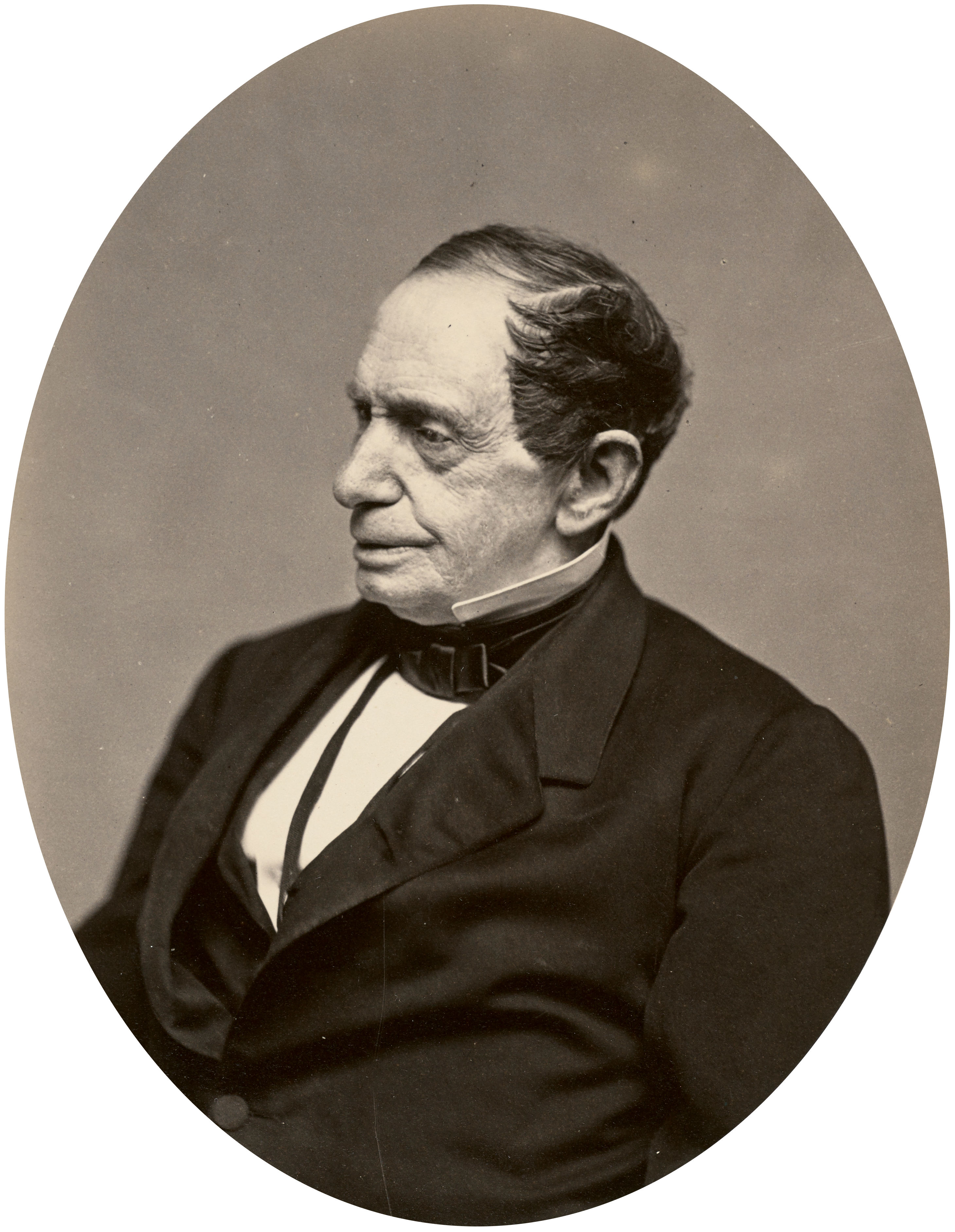
Johns Hopkins

Johns Hopkins was born at the home on May 19, 1795, to Samuel Hopkins (1759–1814) and Hannah Janney (1774–1864). A family of Quakers, the Hopkins family were slaveholders before freeing theirs in 1807 in accordance with their local Quakers' decree. Johns Hopkins lived on the property until 1812, when he left for Baltimore at the age of 17.

The property remained in the Hopkins family until they sold it in 1910. Today, the previous manor house is surrounded by residential development and the Walden Golf Club, and is within the planned community of Crofton.

=== Planned demolition and preservation ===
In 2016, Millersville-based housing developer Polm Companies planned to demolish the historic home for additional space for residential lots. Its potential demolition galvanized an effort by preservation and historic activists, who worked with the developer in an effort to save the mansion.

In 2017, the Maryland nonprofit organization, "The Johns Hopkins House, Inc.," was organized to save and restore Whites Hall. It is recognized as a tax-exempt 501(c)(3) organization by the U.S. Internal Revenue Service.

== See also ==
- Clifton, Hopkins's later home in Baltimore
- Linthicum Walks, another historic home in Crofton
