= Anne Arundel County Free School =

- U.S. National Register of Historic Places
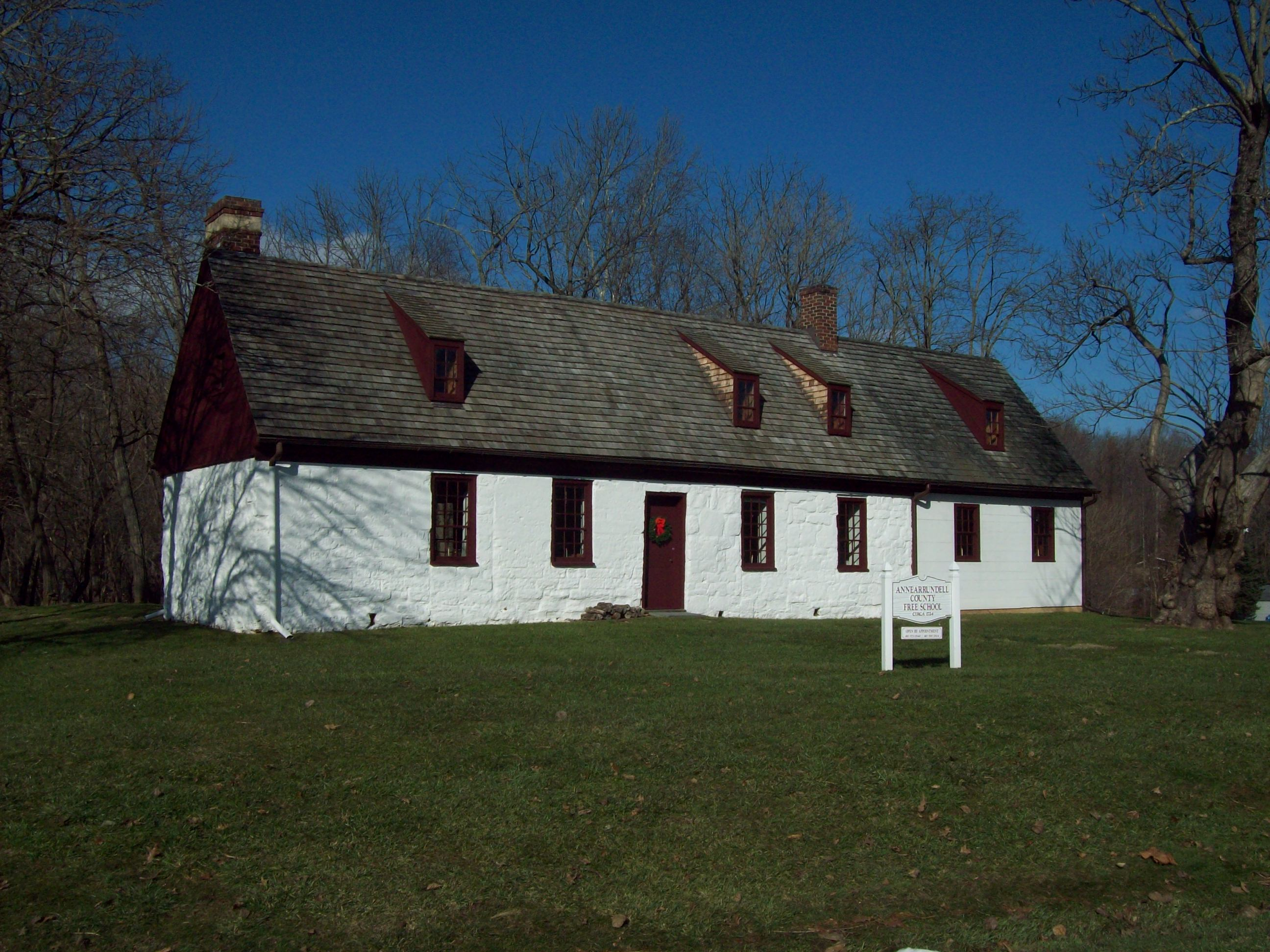
- Anne Arundel County Free School, December 2009

- Location within Maryland Location within the United States
- Location: 1298 Lavall Dr., Davidsonville, Maryland
- Coordinates: 38°58′43″N 76°37′37″W
- Area: 1.4 acres (0.57 ha)
- Built: 1724
- NRHP reference No.: 83002920
- Added to NRHP: June 16, 1983

Anne Arundel County Free School is a historic school building, located in Davidsonville, Anne Arundel County, Maryland. The first Free School of Anne Arundel County was established by an Act of the General Assembly of colonial Maryland in 1723. It was built somewhere between its contractual date of 1724 and 1746 when it was under full operation with John Wilmot as schoolmaster. The existing abandoned building is 49' x 18', and consists of six rooms on two floors. It was built "as near the center of the county as may be, and as may be the most convenient for the boarding of children." The county then included what is now Howard County. It remained in operation until 1912 when the movement toward consolidation forced the closure of many early school buildings. It is the only surviving schoolhouse erected in Maryland in response to the Maryland Free School Act of 1723.

It may have served a prominent role in history as Johns Hopkins likely attended the school from 1806 to 1809. Later, when Hopkins's abolitionist parents freed their slaves, he was forced to quit school and work in their tobacco fields. His great value for education later led to his founding of The Johns Hopkins University.

It was listed on the National Register of Historic Places in 1983.

The school is now a museum owned by the local board of education. It is open for school groups and seasonally on Sunday afternoons. It is taken care of by the Anne Arundel Retired Educators Association.

Recently, there have been improvements made to the building and surrounding grounds. One of these has been the construction of a gravel walkway leading to the building from the road. The walkway was built as part of an Eagle Scout project by a local Boy Scout.

== Gallery ==
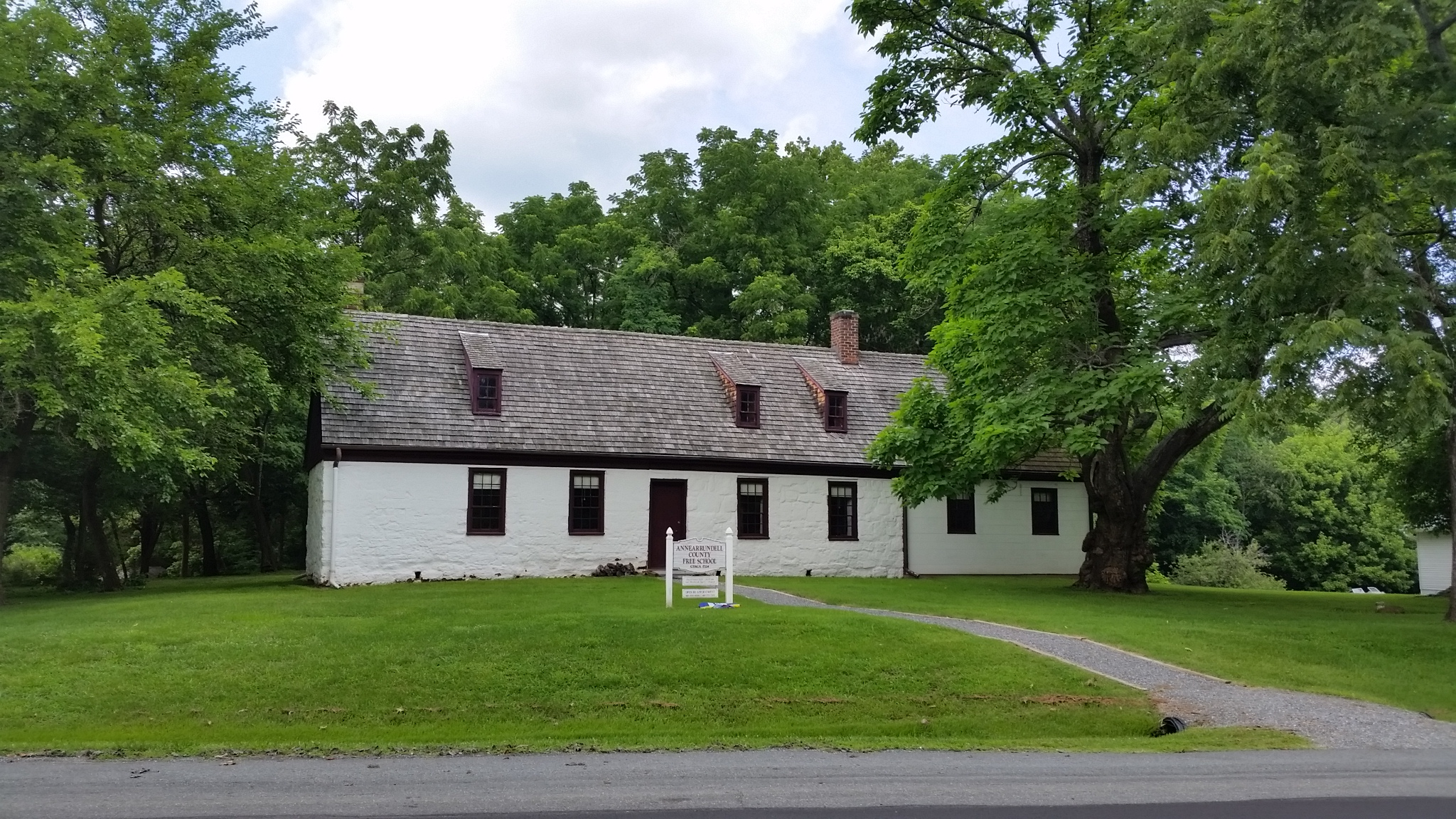
Annearrundell County Free School (original spelling), July 2016

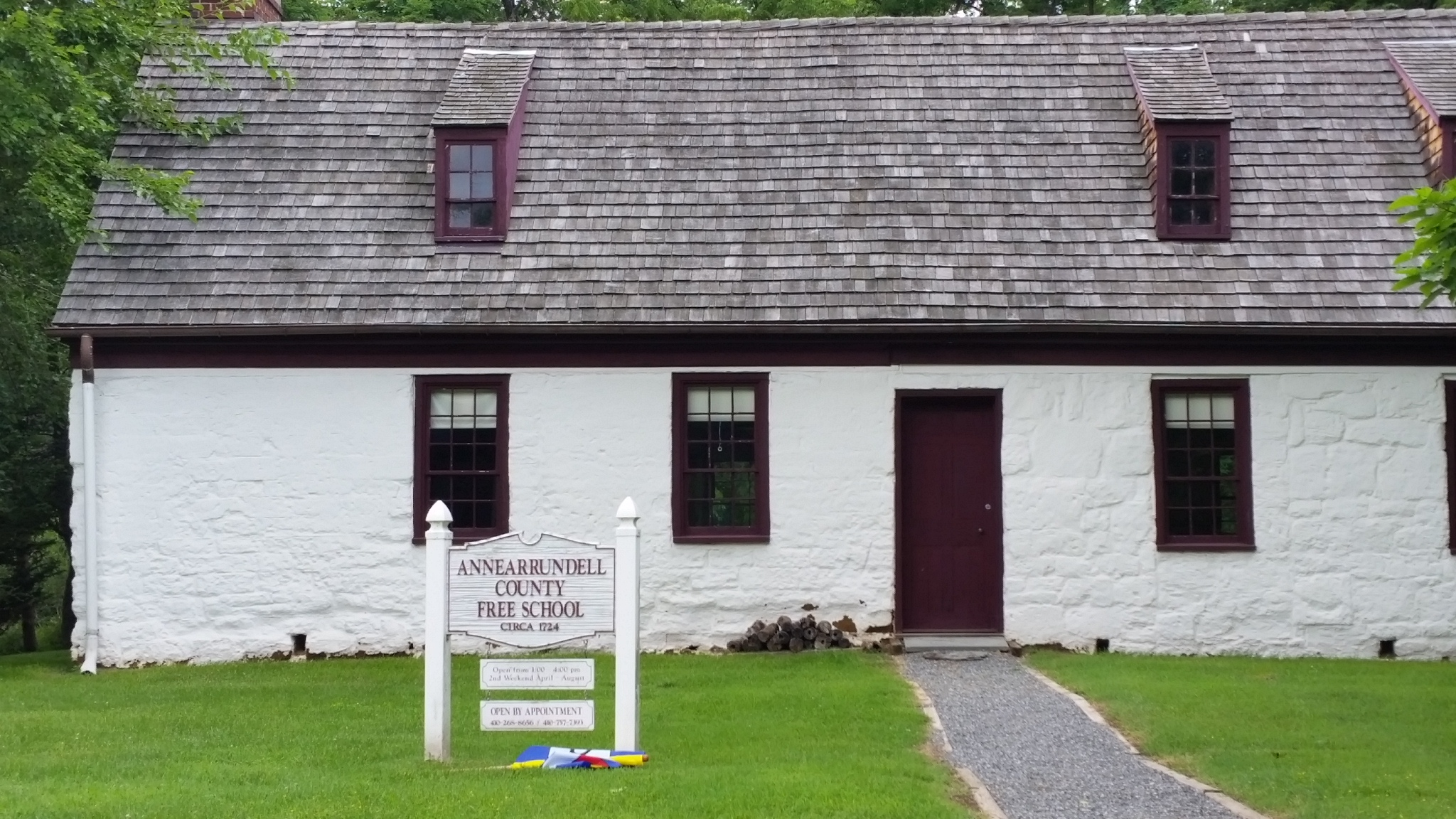
Close-up of Annearrundell County Free School (original spelling), July 2016
