= Davidsonville, Maryland =

Unincorporated community in Maryland, United States

- Unincorporated community
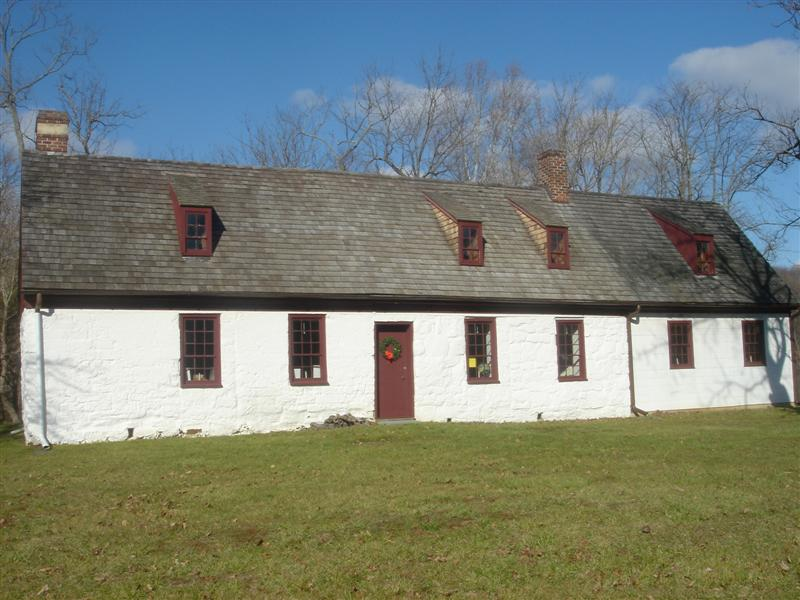
- The Anne Arundel Free School, constructed sometime between 1724 and 1746, is located in Davidsonville in the community of Lavall

- Location within the state of Maryland Davidsonville (the United States)
- Coordinates: 38°55′22″N 76°37′42″W
- Country: United States
- State: Maryland
- County: Anne Arundel
- Time zone: UTC-5 (Eastern (EST))
  - Summer (DST): UTC-4 (EDT)
- ZIP code: 21035

Davidsonville is an unincorporated community in central Anne Arundel County, Maryland, United States. It is a semi-rural community composed mostly of farms and suburban-like developments and is a good example of an "exurb." Davidsonville has relatively little commercial development and no high-density housing. The community is generally not served by public water, sewer or natural gas utilities, so homes generally employ well-and-septic systems. The nominal, if not geographic, center of Davidsonville is the intersection of Maryland routes 424 (Davidsonville Rd.) and 214 (Central Ave.), located at 38.9229°N 76.6284°W. The Davidsonville Historic District was listed on the National Register of Historic Places in 1992.

== Demographics ==
As of the 2010 U.S. census, the Davidsonville ZIP code (21035) had a population of 7,815 and a median annual household income of US$141,011; 1.5 percent of families had incomes below the poverty line. Ethnically, 92 percent of the population was white, four percent was black or African American, two percent was Asian, with the rest other ethnicities. Ninety-four percent of homes were owner-occupied. As of the 2007 United States Census Bureau's Economic Census, 13 year-round retail business establishments and three retail food establishments were located in Davidsonville.

== History ==
=== Native Americans ===
Before European colonists settled in what is now Davidsonville, the area was the home to Algonquian-speaking Native American tribes. By the time Europeans began to arrive in central Anne Arundel County in numbers, the Algonquians may have vacated the area due to persistent raids by more battle-hearty members of the Susquehannock tribe.

=== 18th and 19th centuries ===
Europeans and their descendants settled and developed farms and plantations in and around what came to be known as Davidsonville in the 17th and 18th centuries. Several good examples of 18th century development in the area remain today. One is the Anne Arundel Free School. On October 26, 1723 the Maryland Colonial Assembly, under the Lord Proprietor Charles Calvert, the Fifth Lord Baltimore, and his governor, passed "An Act for the Encouragement of Learning and Erecting Schools in the Several Counties," or the Free School Act. This law, one of the first in colonial America providing for free, publicly supported primary education, mandated the construction of public schools in each of the 12 Maryland counties that existed at the time. The Free School of Anne Arundel County was built in what was to become Davidsonville sometime between 1724 and 1746, when it was under full operation with John Wilmot as schoolmaster. The original structure, expanded and restored, still stands today, is located in the community of Lavall, off Rutland Road, about one-half mile from Maryland Route 450, and is open for tours.

Other examples of development in the 18th century also remain. During the late 18th century, for example, Major William Brogden, once a soldier in the American Revolution, built the Roedown plantation, once the home of the Marlborough Hunt Races, an annual steeplechase event attended by 5,000 spectators until discontinued by new owners. George Washington is reported to have stayed at the house in 1760. Roedown is located off Harwood Rd. in Davidsonville.

Perhaps the most prominent example of 18th century settlement in Davidsonville is the Middle Plantation. The plantation itself dates to a 1664 land grant by Cecil Calvert, 2nd Baron Baltimore to Mareen Duvall, a prominent French immigrant. The current house known as Middle Plantation, located on Davidsonville Rd., includes several stages of construction dating as far back as 1790.

The emergence of Davidsonville as a crossroads community began in the mid-19th century. In 1839, Thomas Davidson, from whose family Davidsonville received its name, married Jane Welch. They built a home at what is now the corner of Davidsonville Road and Central Avenue that still stands today. Davidson, like virtually all plantation owners in central and southern Maryland at the time, owned slaves. However, a staunch Methodist who was instrumental in the founding of what is now the Davidsonville United Methodist Church, Davidson apparently was conflicted as to the morality of slavery.

The Maryland Historical Trust states that "the Davidsonville Historic District is significant as a largely intact representative example of the type of crossroads community which characterized rural Anne Arundel County in the late 19th and early 20th centuries. Davidsonville is among the best-preserved examples of this type of community remaining in the county; other comparable villages have been obliterated by subsequent development. The village has maintained substantial integrity despite increasingly intensive development pressure in the surrounding area."

== Education ==
Davidsonville is home to Davidsonville Elementary School, which has approximately 700 students in kindergarten through fifth grade. Also serving the area are the Free School of Anne Arundel County, the first such school of that county, which then included what is now Howard County and likely school for Johns Hopkins, Central Middle School (Edgewater, Maryland), Crofton Woods Elementary School (Crofton, Maryland), Crofton Middle School (Gambrills, Maryland), Crofton High School (Gambrills, Maryland) and South River High School (Edgewater, Maryland).

== Notable people ==
- Mareen Duvall (1625–1699), French Huguenot and an early American settler who built the Middle Plantation in Davidsonville.
- Larry Hogan, former Governor of Maryland, lives in Davidsonville
- John E. Morrison, US Army major general
- Travis Pastrana, a professional motocross racer and NASCAR driver who represents Red Bull.
- Pat Spencer, a professional basketball player and the Tewaaraton Award winner in 2019

== See also ==
- Watkins Slave Cemetery
