= Crofton, Maryland =

- Census-designated place
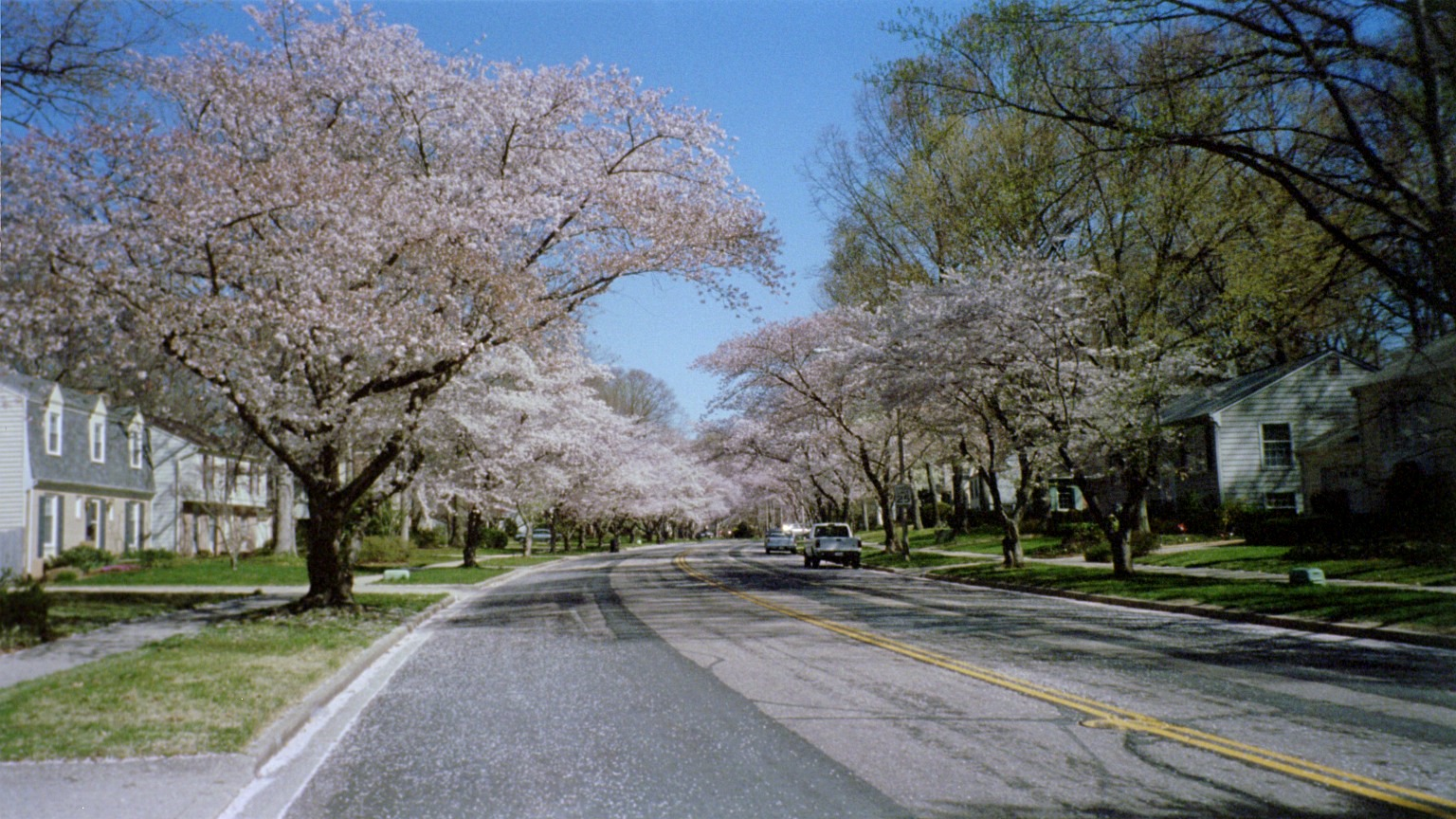
- Crofton Parkway

- Flag

- Location of Crofton, Maryland
- Coordinates: 39°0′15″N 76°41′18″W
- Country: United States
- State: Maryland
- County: Anne Arundel
- Founded: 1964

Government
  - Type: Town Hall

Area
  - Total: 6.61 sq mi (17.12 km^{2})
  - Land: 6.61 sq mi (17.12 km^{2})
  - Water: 0 sq mi (0.00 km^{2})
- Elevation: 98 ft (30 m)

Population (2020)
  - Total: 29,641
  - Density: 4,483.3/sq mi (1,731.01/km^{2})
- Time zone: UTC−5 (Eastern (EST))
  - Summer (DST): UTC−4 (EDT)
- ZIP code: 21114
- Area codes: 410, 443, and 667
- FIPS code: 24-20875
- GNIS feature ID: 0590046
- Website: www.croftoncommunity.org

Crofton is a census-designated place and planned community in Anne Arundel County, Maryland, United States, located 9.8 miles (15.8 km) west of the state capital Annapolis, 24 miles (39 km) south of Baltimore, and 24 miles (39 km) east-northeast of Washington, D.C. The community was established in 1964 and as of the 2020 census, it had a population of 29,136.

== History ==
=== Development ===
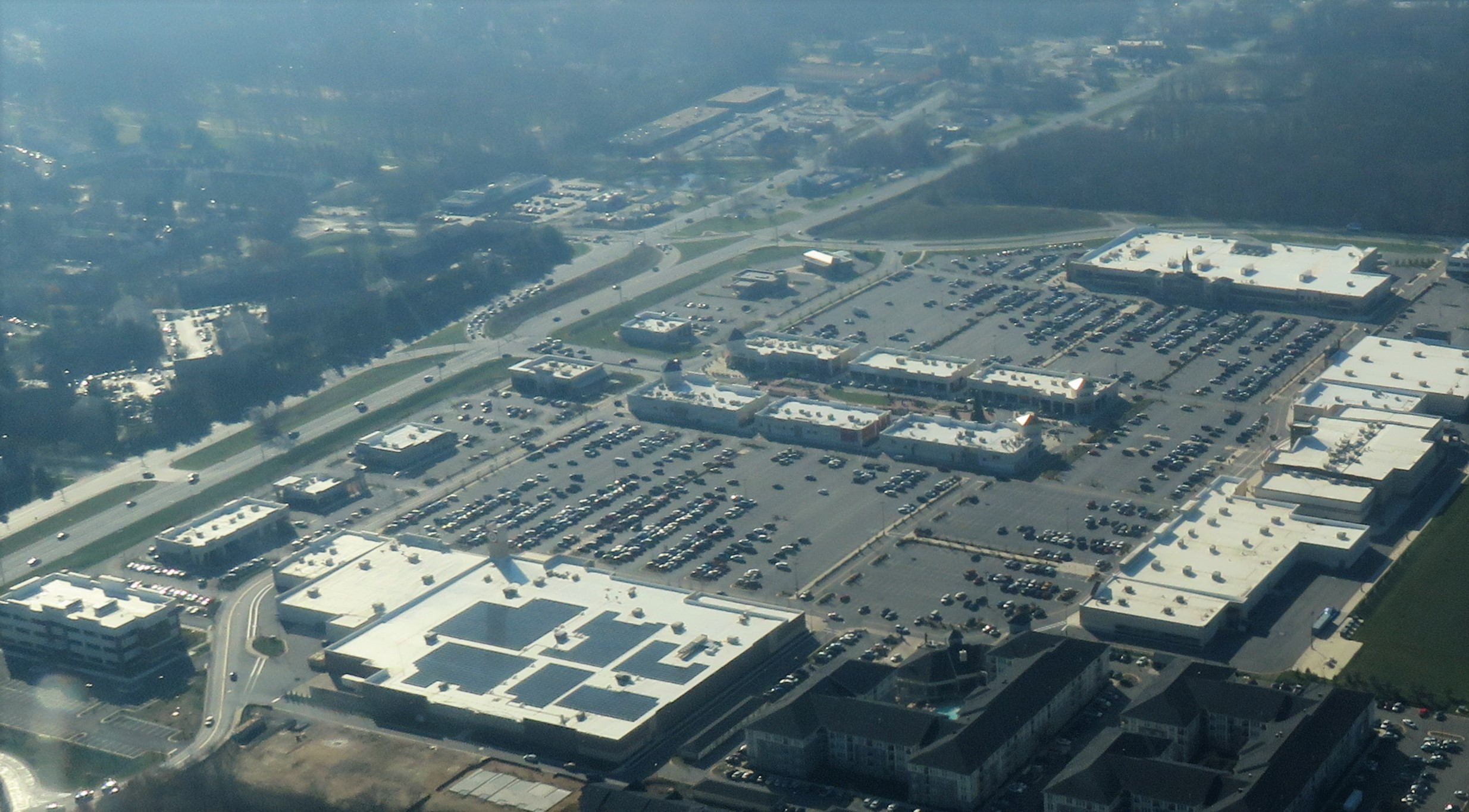
Waugh Chapel Towne Center in 2015

In 1963, after the Crawford Corporation accumulated over 1,600 acres (650 ha) of land, it announced that it would build a new community called Crofton. This new town and planned community was founded at the same time as Reston, Virginia (April 17, 1964) and Columbia, Maryland (1967). Crofton would be anchored by a community golf course, which later became the Crofton Country Club. Crofton was officially founded in the fall of 1964. The company considered picking an English name for the new town that "sounds well and implies that this is a pleasant place to live." It ended up picking the name "Crofton", named after a small township in Cumberland County, England. (Crofton, England was originally called Croft-town, derived from the word "Croft", as the town standing upon the Crofts.) Crofton, Maryland was founded as a community for racial exclusion.

=== Crofton pond snakehead fish incident ===
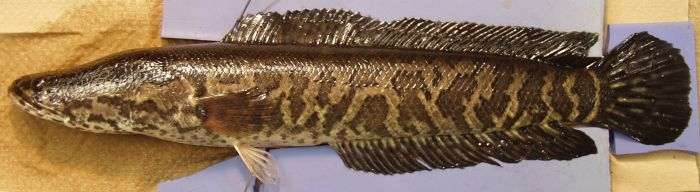
Northern snakehead

Crofton was in the national news in late June and early July 2002 after a fish called the northern snakehead was discovered in a local pond. The infestation was found in water behind the Crofton post office and the adjacent shopping center, across Route 3 from local landmark Lake Louise.

The snakehead species is highly aggressive and voracious. In order to ensure that the fish were eliminated, in September 2002 the main pond and two nearby ponds were dosed heavily with rotenone and subsequently with potassium permanganate. Six adult snakeheads and more than one thousand juvenile fish were found and destroyed.

Ultimately, the incident initiated a national discussion on invasive species. One comparison case was the mute swan, also an invasive and destructive species of the Chesapeake Bay watershed but, in comparison, quite beautiful, and which garnered support from some environmental and animal rights groups.

Several movies were inspired by this incident. Syfy aired two movies in relation to the snakehead outbreak: in March 2004, a movie called Snakehead Terror was featured, and the movie Frankenfish was aired in June 2004. Ten Pound Films also produced a feature film titled Swarm of the Snakehead which related to this incident. In 2007, a documentary titled Fishzilla: Snakehead Invasion aired on the National Geographic Channel, discussing the ecological damage that the snakeheads found in Crofton have done to surrounding areas.

== Geography ==
The original community of Crofton was built on the Duvall family farm located within a triangle formed by three major roads: Crain Highway (Maryland Route 3) to the northwest, Davidsonville Road (Maryland Route 424) to the northeast, and Defense Highway (Maryland Route 450) to the south. Within the triangle, Crofton Parkway, a loop road 3.5 miles (5.6 km) long, encircles the center of the community.

The Crofton CDP now extends north and east from the triangle, including Crofton Park and reaching northeast as far as St. Stephens Church Road.

The Little Patuxent River borders Crofton on its southwest corner at the intersection of Route 3 and Route 450, providing a buffer between Anne Arundel and Prince George's counties.

According to the United States Census Bureau, the Crofton CDP has a total area of 6.6 square miles (17.1 km^{2}), all land.

== Education ==
=== Schools ===
Crofton contains a number of public schools, administered by the Anne Arundel County Public Schools system:

- Crofton Elementary School, grades K-5
- Crofton Meadows Elementary School, grades K-5
- Crofton Woods Elementary School, grades K-5
- Nantucket Elementary School, grades K-5
- Millersville Elementary School, Millersville, Maryland, grades K-5 (serves Crofton area students living along St. Stephens Church Road between Johns Hopkins Road and Route 3)

For grades 6–8, students from all four of these elementary schools attend Crofton Middle School in adjacent Gambrills, Maryland, with the exception of a portion of Nantucket Elementary School students who live along Riedel Road between Route 3 and Nantucket Drive. These students will attend Arundel Middle School

Students residing in communities along St Stephens Church Road between Johns Hopkins Road and Route 3 attend Old Mill Middle School North.

Older students from Crofton attend one of three high schools:

- Crofton High School, grades 9-12, also in adjacent Gambrills, Maryland.. Serves the vast majority of students living in the Crofton area.

- Arundel High School grades 9-12, also in adjacent Gambrills, Maryland. Will serve Crofton area students who reside in communities along Riedel Road between Nantucket Drive and Route 3 beginning in the 2026-2027 school year

- Severn Run High School grades 9-12, located in Severn, Maryland. Serves Crofton area students living along St. Stephens Church Road between Johns Hopkins Road and Route 3.

In response to overcrowding caused by continuing development in Bowie, the historical nemesis of Crofton and BRAC realignments, a redistricting proposal was approved for Crofton schools in 2013 and construction began in late 2018 on Crofton High School. A redistricting committee was formed in late 2018. In April 2019, the school board adopted a redistricting plan under which all students from the four local elementary schools will attend the new high school. Kathryn Feuerherd was appointed principal in May 2019. Crofton High School has been opened as of September 2020.

There are also some private preschools in Crofton:

- Beaver Creek Child Care
- Crofton Children's Centre
- Crofton Day School
- Crofton Nursery School
- Creative Garden Nursery School and Kindergarten

== Demographics ==
Historical population
Census	Pop.	Note	%±
2010	27,348		—
2020	29,641		8.4%
U.S. Decennial Census

=== 2020 census ===
As of the 2020 census, Crofton had a population of 29,641. The median age was 37.1 years. 27.2% of residents were under the age of 18 and 11.5% of residents were 65 years of age or older. For every 100 females there were 92.5 males, and for every 100 females age 18 and over there were 88.9 males age 18 and over.

100.0% of residents lived in urban areas, while 0.0% lived in rural areas.

There were 10,543 households in Crofton, of which 42.1% had children under the age of 18 living in them. Of all households, 56.0% were married-couple households, 13.3% were households with a male householder and no spouse or partner present, and 25.7% were households with a female householder and no spouse or partner present. About 21.0% of all households were made up of individuals and 6.7% had someone living alone who was 65 years of age or older.

There were 10,822 housing units, of which 2.6% were vacant. The homeowner vacancy rate was 0.8% and the rental vacancy rate was 3.5%.

Racial composition as of the 2020 census
Race	Number	Percent
White	19,603	66.1%
Black or African American	4,490	15.1%
American Indian and Alaska Native	65	0.2%
Asian	2,020	6.8%
Native Hawaiian and Other Pacific Islander	21	0.1%
Some other race	661	2.2%
Two or more races	2,781	9.4%
Hispanic or Latino (of any race)	2,176	7.3%

=== 2010 census ===
In 2010, Crofton had grown to 27,348, an increase of 36%. The median age remained at 35 years. Of the 10,203 housing units, most were households of families (71.5%) with an average household size of 2.67 people.

Census data show an increase in the percentage of minorities living in Crofton. In 2000, the racial makeup of the community was 90.21% White, 5.13% African American, 0.23% Native American, 2.33% Asian, 0.04% Pacific Islander, 0.60% from other races, and 1.44% from two or more races; Latino was 2.48% of the population. In the 2010 census, the racial makeup of the community was 79.8% White (−10.4%), 10.3% Black (+5.2%), 4.7% Latino (+2.2%), 3.3% two or more races (+1.9%), 4.9% Asian (+2.6%), .1% Native American (+.1%), and 1.4% "some other race".

=== 2000 census ===
As of the 2000 census, there were 20,091 people, 7,404 households, and 5,478 families residing in the Crofton census-designated place. The population density was 3,998.6 inhabitants per square mile (1,543.9/km^{2}). There were 7,573 housing units at an average density of 1,507.2 units per square mile (581.9 units/km^{2}). There were 7,404 households, out of which 40.9% had children under the age of 18 living with them, 60.9% were married couples living together, 10.0% had a female householder with no husband present, and 26.0% were non-families. 20.1% of all households were made up of individuals, and 3.4% had someone living alone who was 65 years of age or older. The average household size was 2.69 and the average family size was 3.13. In the community the population was spread out, with 28.6% under the age of 18, 6.0% from 18 to 24, 35.6% from 25 to 44, 23.2% from 45 to 64, and 6.5% who were 65 years of age or older. The median age was 35 years. For every 100 females, there were 94.3 males. For every 100 females age 18 and over, there were 90.2 males.

=== Population history ===
The U.S. Census Bureau has recorded the following populations for the Crofton census-designated place.

Year	Total Population
1960	NA
1970	4,478
1980	12,009
1990	12,781
2000	20,091
2010	27,348
2020	29,136

=== Earnings data ===
Crofton has experienced a 33.99% income growth rate since 2000. This exceeds both the Maryland state average rate (30.24%) and the national average rate (19.17%).

According to a 2007 estimate, the median income for a household in the area was $93,198, and the median income for a family was $101,644. Males had a median income of $56,819 versus $41,229 for females. The per capita income for the area was $33,518. About 2.0% of families and 2.7% of the population were below the poverty line, including 3.0% of those under age 18 and 2.3% of those age 65 or over.

Income has risen since then. Based on the American Community Survey for 2008–2012, median incomes in the area were $104,279 for households and $120,316 for families. The per capita income for the area was $43,452. About 1.9% of families and 3.4% of the population were below the poverty line, including 1.9% of those under age 18 and 3.9% of those age 65 or over.

== Governance ==
The original (old) section of Crofton is a Special Community Benefit District (SCBD) governed by the Board of Directors of the Crofton Civic Association. The Crofton SCBD staff includes a Town Manager, Non Governmental Figure Head Mayor Tip Conquick, Police, Recreation Coordinator, Maintenance Technician, A Director to the Office of the Mayor and administrative staff that provide for grounds and park maintenance, public safety, and community recreation programs and events. Town Hall is sometimes located in the older section of Crofton, at the corner of Crofton Parkway and Duke of Kent Drive. The structure was built as the sales center for the original Crawford development; it was donated to the community in 1973. Town Hall contains offices for the town manager, other Crofton SCBD staff, and the police department. Newer sections of Crofton area are not incorporated and include several HOAs.

== Crime and law enforcement ==
The Crofton Special Community Benefit District is policed by the Crofton Police Department, which was founded in 1969. The department operates under the Anne Arundel County Charter, aided by the Anne Arundel County Police Department and Sheriff's Office as directed by authority.

== Landmarks ==
- Katcef Archeological Site – archaeological site with native camp sites ranging from the Paleo-Indian Clovis period to the late Woodland period. It was listed on the National Register of Historic Places in 1991.
- Linthicum Walks – a home built over 200 years ago by Thomas Linthicum III, a member of an influential family in Anne Arundel County. The original grant for the land was to Evan Davis in 1672 and obtained in 1699 by Thomas Linthicum, a Welsh immigrant. It was part of a medium-sized tobacco farm. George Washington stayed here during his travels to and from Annapolis and Philadelphia and his home at Mount Vernon, Virginia. Located next to Crofton Middle School and the new Crofton High School, Linthicum Walks is owned by Anne Arundel County, run by the Department of Recreation and Parks and maintained by the Friends of Linthicum Walks. It was listed on the National Register of Historic Places in 1984.
- White's Hall – birthplace of Johns Hopkins, entrepreneur and philanthropist whose greatest legacy is the funding of Johns Hopkins University. Gerrard Hopkins came to America from England, settling in Crofton in 1660. The Hopkins family was in the Crofton area for 270 years and accumulated more than 1,000 acres (400 ha) of land. The historic house – built in the late 1700s – still exists near the corner of Riedel Road and Johns Hopkins Road. It is privately owned but empty.

== Notable people ==
- Spiro Agnew – Following his resignation as Vice President of the United States, Agnew ran Pathlite, Inc., a consulting firm in Crofton.
- Kyle Beckerman – Major League Soccer player for Real Salt Lake and 2014 World Cup star of the U.S. Team. Raised in Crofton and attended Crofton Woods Elementary School, Crofton Middle School, and DeMatha High School (in Hyattsville, MD) and Arundel High School in Gambrills, MD.
- Bill Belichick – head coach of the New England Patriots was raised in Crofton and went to Annapolis High
- Peter Bondra – hockey player
- Johns Hopkins – businessman involved in the building of the B&O Railroad, founded Johns Hopkins University and Johns Hopkins Hospital
- Chris Kubasik – former president and Chief Operating Officer of Lockheed Martin Corporation, now living in Potomac, MD, was raised in Crofton and went to Arundel High School
- Tom McMillen – former Democratic congressman, Rhodes Scholar, and pro basketball player.
- Gheorghe Mureșan – former pro basketball player for the Washington Bullets (1993–1998), holds the record as being the tallest man ever to play in the NBA.
- Edward Snowden – Leaked sensitive government documents regarding mass surveillance. Attended Crofton Woods Elementary School, Crofton Middle School, and Arundel High School for 1 1/2 years.

== Sources ==
- Browne, Joseph L., From Sotweed to Suburbia: A History of the Crofton, Maryland Area, 40th Anniversary version, 1660–1960. Baltimore: Gateway Press, Inc., published by the Crofton Rotary to fund the restoration of Linthicum Walks.
- "Crofton Small Area Plan", Anne Arundel County Citizens Information Center, Anne Arundel County, February 23, 2001, archived from the original on December 20, 2003
