= Katcef Archeological Site =

- U.S. National Register of Historic Places
- Nearest city: Crofton, Maryland
- MPS: Prehistoric Human Adaptation to the Coastal Plain Environment of Anne Arundel County MPS
- NRHP reference No.: 91001600
- Added to NRHP: November 08, 1991

The Katcef Archeological Site is an archaeological site near Crofton in Anne Arundel County, Maryland. It is a series of overlapping base camp sites dating from the Clovis phase of the Paleoindian period, through to the Late Woodland period. The primary era of site utilization was during the Late Archaic period.

It was listed on the National Register of Historic Places in 1991.
