= Jill E. Brown =

American aviator

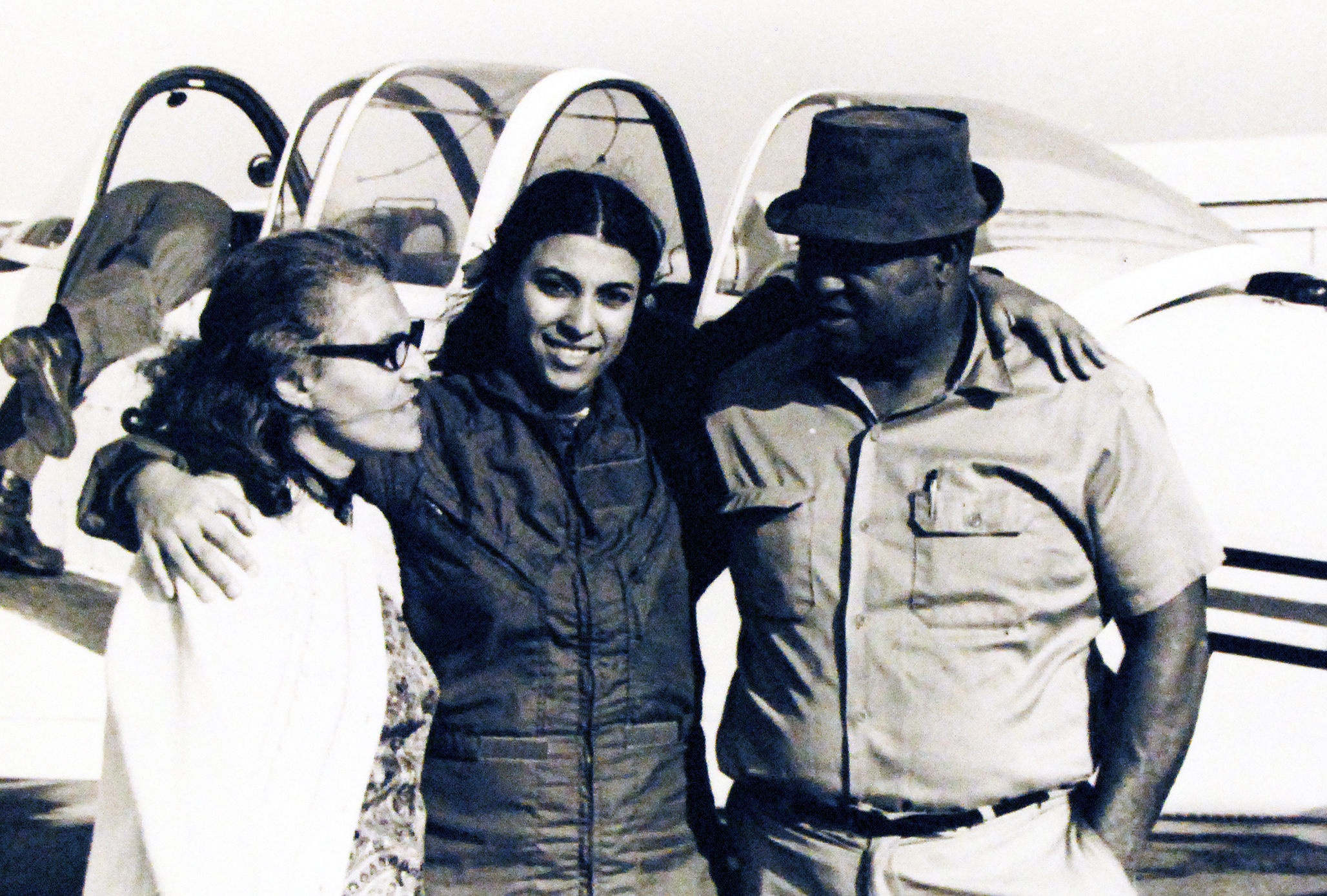
- Brown (center) and her parents stand alongside a T-34B Mentor training aircraft, in 1974
- Born: Jill Elaine Brown; 1950 (age 75–76); Baltimore, Maryland
- Education: University of Maryland
- Known for: First African-American female pilot to be employed by a US airline
- Aviation career
- First flight: 1967

Jill E. Brown (born 1950) is a retired American pilot, who is the first African-American woman to become a pilot for a major American passenger airline.

== Early life and education ==
Jill Elaine Brown was born to Gilbert and Elaine Brown in 1950 in Baltimore, Maryland. By the age of 11, she had begun driving a forklift at her father's construction company, and at the age of 17 joined her other family members in taking flying lessons. She was the first of her family to earn her pilot's licence, with her first solo flight taking place in a Piper J-3 Cub. She then began flying the family owned Piper PA-28 Cherokee, named the Little Golden Hawk.

After attending Arundel High School, she went to the University of Maryland, where she studied home economics at the suggestion of her mother.

== Career ==
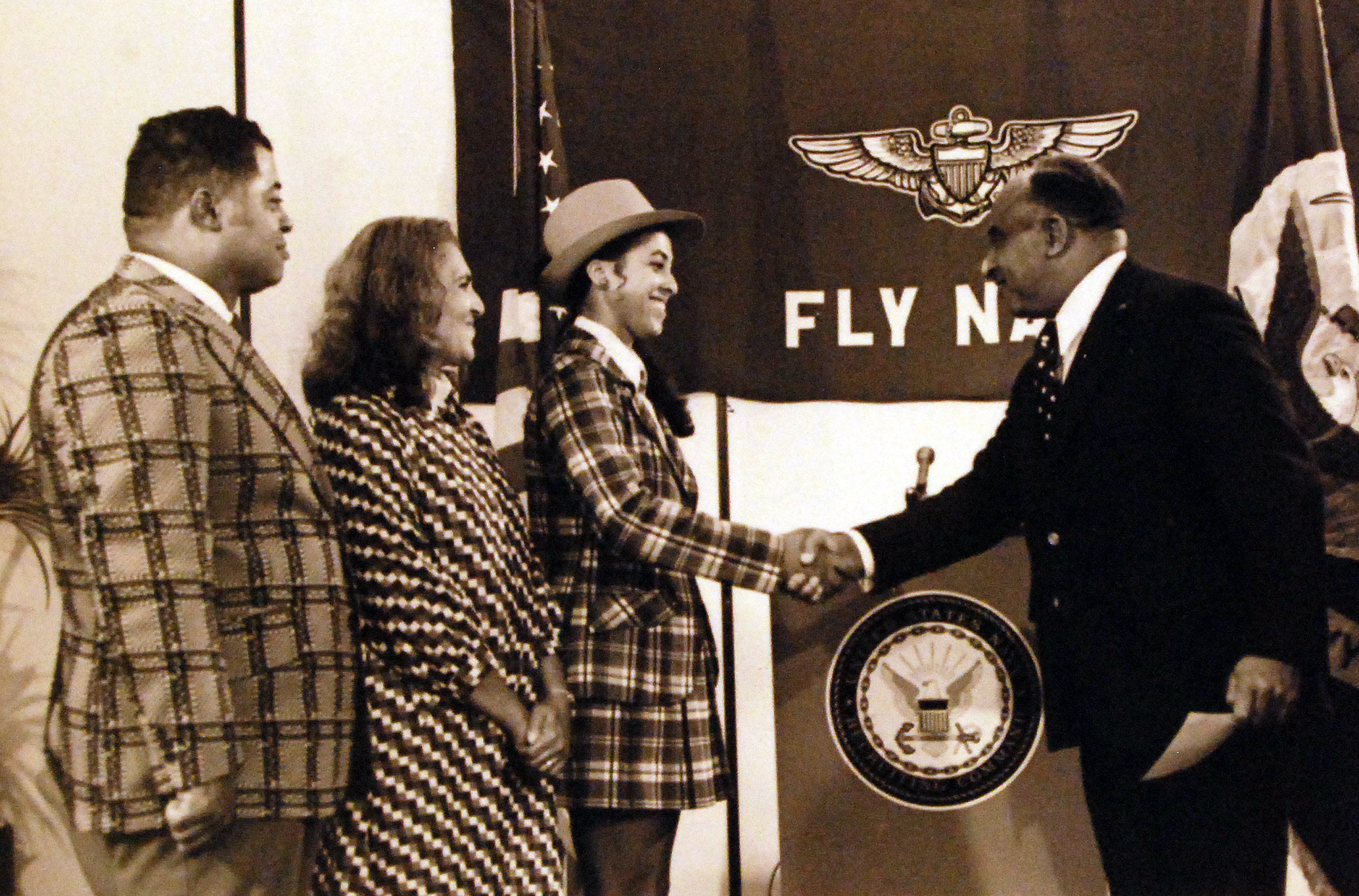
Spann Watson, right, congratulates just sworn in aviation officer candidate Jill Brown, 1974. Looking on are Miss Brown’s parents, Mr. and Mrs. Gilbert Brown.

Afterwards, she began working as a teacher but decided to pursue flying as a career, joining the US Navy in 1974 for flight training. Brown was the first African-American woman to undergo the training. Her admittance, and her swearing in by Tuskegee Airman Spann Watson was heavily covered in the African-American media.

She disliked being in the military, and left with an honourable discharge after six months. Brown admitted that she couldn't "keep her mouth shut" and made some major mistakes. She felt humiliated when she left, and initially refused to leave her home. She convinced Warren H. Wheeler of Wheeler Airlines to give her a job, initially as a ticket-counter clark but Brown as Wheeler had no pilot vacancies. Eventually she worked her way into a pilot's position. From her private hours and working at Wheeler, she managed to amass the 1,200 flying hours required to fly for a major airline. In 1978, she joined Texas International Airlines as a pilot, becoming the first female African-American pilot for a major US airline. However, she felt she was being used for publicity purposes by the airline.

She left Texas after a year, joining the cargo carrier Zantop International Airlines, and worked there until 1985. In 1990, she filed a lawsuit against United Airlines for refusing to hire her on three occasions, but the case was found in favor of the airline even after an appeal.
