= Davidsonville Historic District =

Historic district in Maryland, United States

- U.S. National Register of Historic Places
- U.S. Historic district
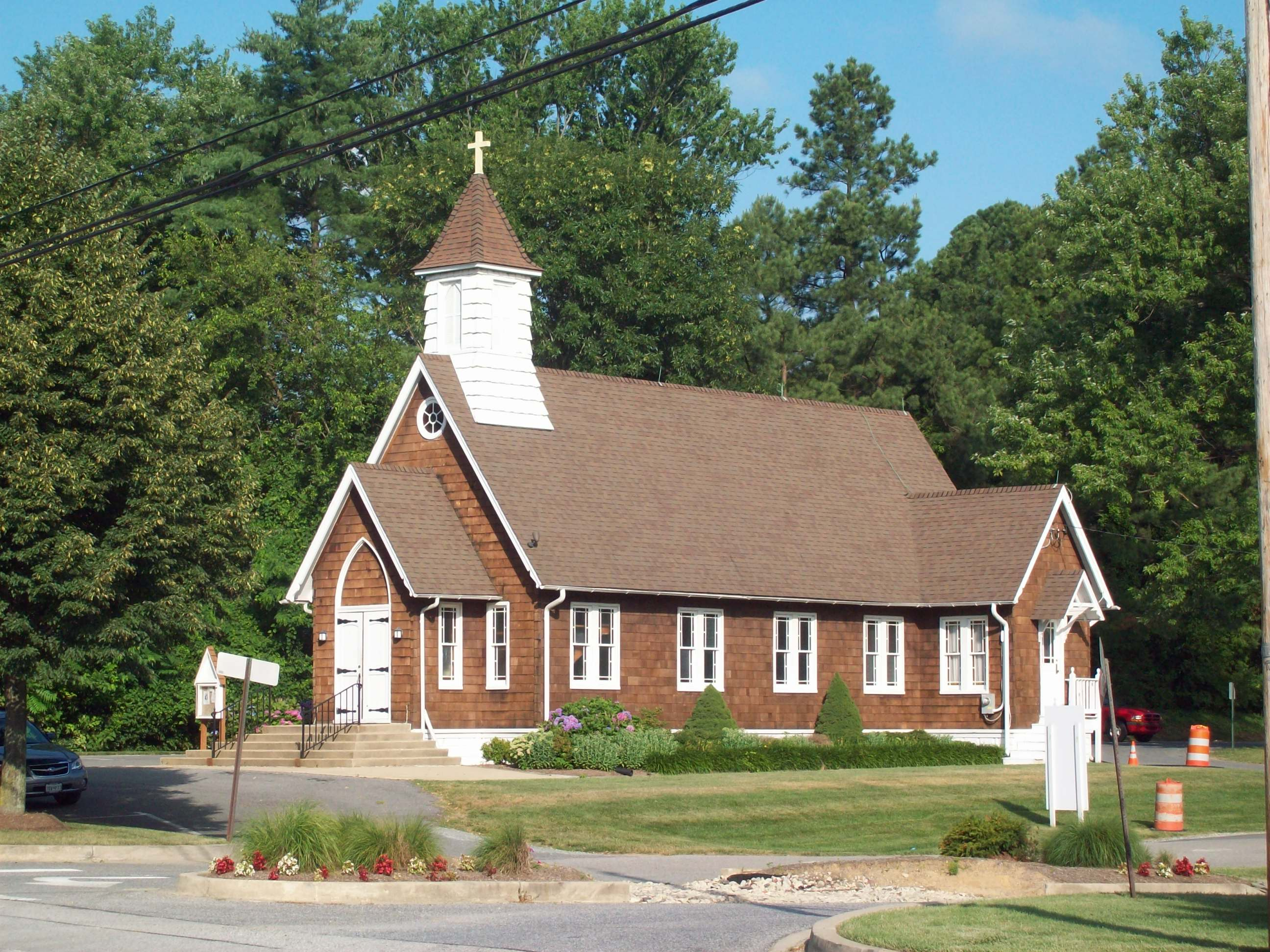
- Historic Holy Family Catholic Church, Davidsonville, MD, July 2009

- Location within Maryland Location within the United States
- Location: Along MD 214 E to jct. with Davidsonville Rd., Davidsonville, Maryland
- Coordinates: 38°55′19″N 76°37′51″W
- Built: 1835
- Architectural style: Bungalow/Craftsman, Late Victorian, Federal
- NRHP reference No.: 92000141
- Added to NRHP: March 27, 1992

Davidsonville Historic District is a national historic district at Davidsonville, Anne Arundel County, Maryland. It is located around a rural crossroads at the intersection of Central Avenue (MD 214) and Davidsonville Road (MD 424). The district consists of fifteen properties: three churches, one commercial building, and eleven houses. They represent the period from the village's initial settlement in about 1835 through the early 20th century.

It was listed on the National Register of Historic Places in 1992.
