= Mount Airy (Davidsonville, Maryland) =

Historic house in Maryland, United States

- U.S. National Register of Historic Places
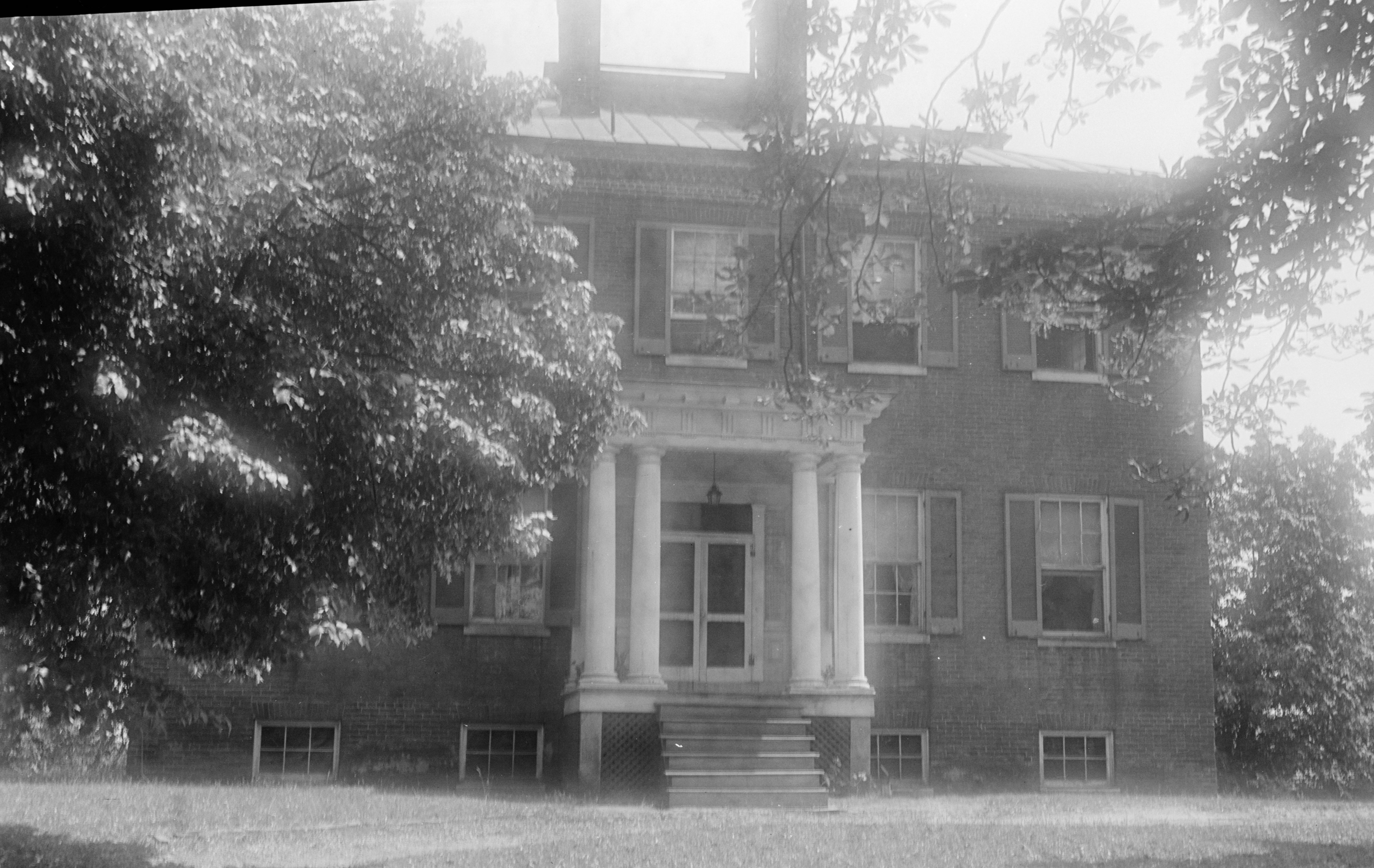
- Mount Airy, HABS Photo, July 1940

- Location within Maryland Location within the United States
- Location: Mount Airy Rd. off MD 424, Davidsonville, Maryland
- Coordinates: 38°55′42″N 76°38′11″W
- Built: 1857
- NRHP reference No.: 73000894
- Added to NRHP: April 13, 1973

Mount Airy is a historic home at Davidsonville, Anne Arundel County, Maryland. It is a two-story, cube-shaped brick Georgian-Federal style, late neo-classical dwelling with a Doric portico on a central hall plan. It was built about 1857 for James Alexis Iglehart, whose children were educated by their French tutor in the family schoolhouse. In addition to the schoolhouse, a mid-19th century frame smokehouse is also on the property.

It was listed on the National Register of Historic Places in 1973.
