= Indian Range =

Historic house in Maryland, United States

- U.S. National Register of Historic Places
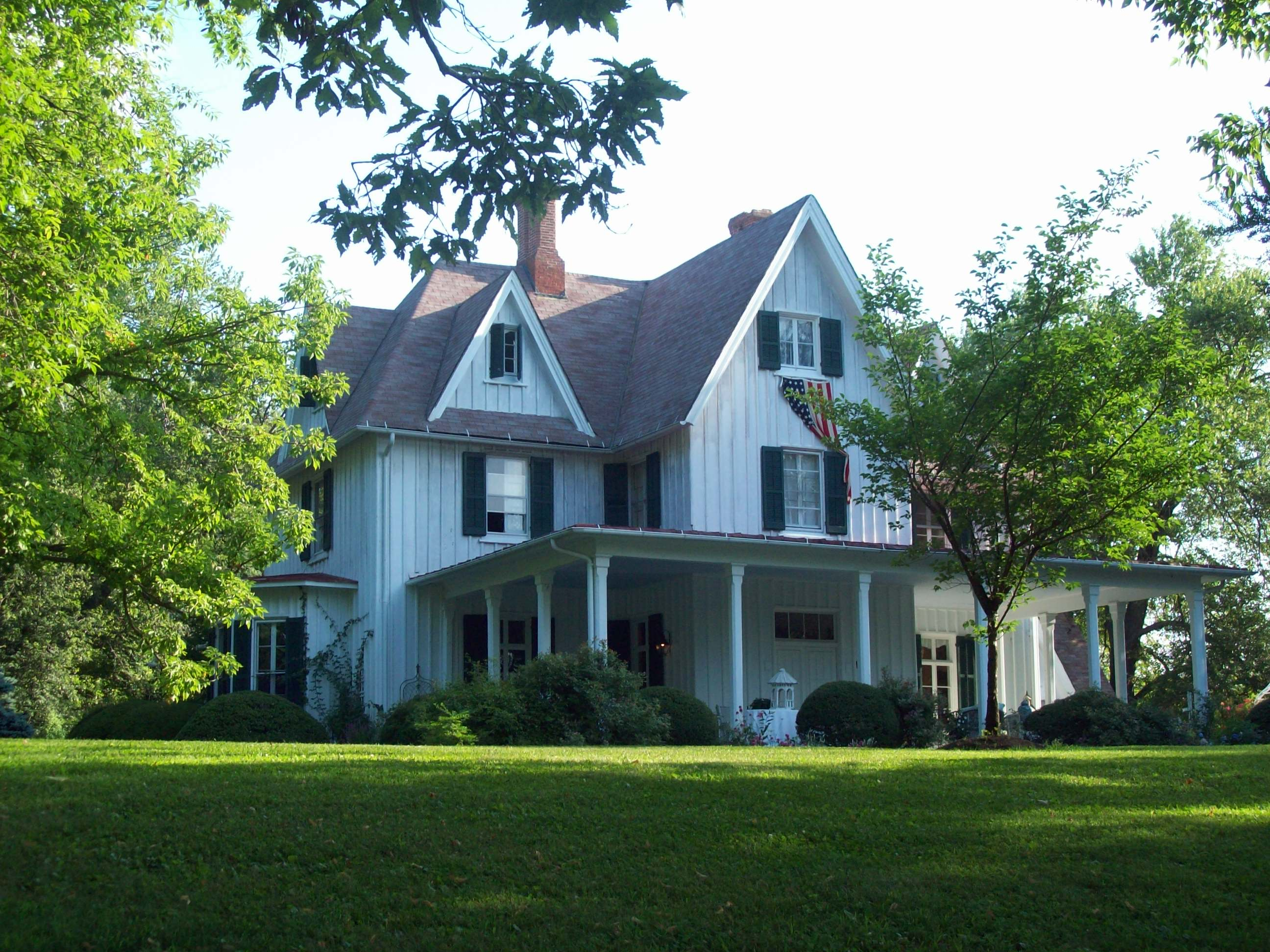
- Indian Range, July 2009

- Location within Maryland Location within the United States
- Location: 1012 Mt. Airy Rd., Davidsonville, Maryland
- Coordinates: 38°55′46″N 76°38′55″W
- Built: c. 1852
- Architectural style: Carpenter Gothic
- NRHP reference No.: 86000255
- Added to NRHP: February 13, 1986

Indian Range is a historic home at Davidsonville, Anne Arundel County, Maryland. It is a 2 1/2-story frame hip-roofed Carpenter Gothic style country "villa" with board and batten siding, steeply pitched cross gables, and tall, chamfered chimneys. It was built about 1852.

It was listed on the National Register of Historic Places in 1986.
