= Crofton High School (Maryland) =

School in Maryland, US

Coordinates: 39°0′7″N 76°40′6″W

Location
- 2291 Davidsonville Road; Gambrills, Maryland 21054; United States

Information
- Type: Public secondary
- Established: 2020
- Principal: Gregory Thomas Ryan
- Grades: 9-12
- Gender: Co-ed
- Enrollment: 1,805 (2023–2024)
- Capacity: 1,696
- Hours in school day: 8:30 am – 3:18 pm
- Campus size: 123.89 acres (50.14 ha)
- Campus type: Suburban
- Colors: Red and Black
- Mascot: Cardinal
- Website: https://www.croftonhigh.com/

Crofton High School is a high school located in the suburban community of Gambrills, Maryland, United States, a suburb of Washington DC and Baltimore located within Anne Arundel County. It serves students from the greater Crofton area, and it is part of the Anne Arundel County Public Schools district.

The school opened its doors (virtually) on September 8, 2020, to students in grades 9 and 10 only. The school began serving grades 9-11 in September, 2021, and added its first senior class in the fall of 2022 (comprising the school's first graduating class, the Class of 2023).

== History ==
Historically, all high school students in Crofton were served by Arundel High School in Gambrills. However, in the 1990s, Arundel High School began experiencing extreme overcrowding issues to the point where the school held split sessions to alleviate the overcrowding. Eventually, community members started pushing for county officials to build a new high school in Crofton. In 1998, instead of building a new high school in Crofton, Anne Arundel County Public Schools officials decided to split Crofton Middle School students between two high schools in the county. The plan redistricted students zoned to Crofton Meadows and Crofton Woods Elementary Schools from Arundel High School to South River High School in Edgewater beginning in the fall of 1998. Crofton residents were told by school district officials that the redistricting of students from Arundel to South River was only a temporary measure until a high school in Crofton would be built in the near future. However, the "temporary" solution became permanent as Crofton Middle School graduates were continuously split between Arundel and South River High Schools for 17 years with no plans of a new Crofton High School. During those 17 years, Crofton residents (as well as residents of nearby towns such as Odenton and other areas in Anne Arundel County) were advocating for a new high school to be built, but many of the attempts were met with no success. The most recent was an activist group called "Build Crofton High School", formed in 2012 by Crofton residents.

In 2015, AACPS hired MGT of America, a Tampa-based consultant, to do a professional study on their facilities. The consultants strongly suggested building a new high school in Crofton. As a result, Anne Arundel County Public Schools later adopted a plan to build a new high school in Crofton. It was decided that the new high school would be built on a portion of the land that belongs to Crofton Park, behind Crofton Middle School. Construction for the new school building began in November 2017.

Attendance boundaries for the school were finalized in April 2019. On August 26, 2019, a community meeting was held at Crofton Middle School with attendance by parents, students, and area residents; the meeting included a ballot on an unofficial name for the new high school, in which voters favored the name "Crofton High School" with 323 out of 402 votes. The name "Crofton High School" was officially approved by the county's Board of Education on September 11, 2019.

== Students ==
Crofton High School is located in Gambrills, Maryland. Crofton High School only has one feeder middle school, which is Crofton Middle School. Crofton Middle School has four feeder elementary schools: Crofton E.S., Crofton Meadows E.S., Crofton Woods E.S., and Nantucket E.S. The Crofton cluster is bordered by the Arundel cluster to the north, the South River cluster to the south, the Bowie cluster to the west (Prince George’s County Public Schools), and the Old Mill cluster to the east.

Crofton High School's grand-opening was not held in person, as Crofton High opened during the midst of the COVID-19 pandemic. Like most other Maryland school districts, Anne Arundel County Public Schools decided to start the first half of the 2020–2021 school year virtually due to the second rise in cases of COVID-19 in July 2020. Thus, Crofton High opened its doors to its first students online.

Crofton High has a theatre department, known amongst the students, for being one of the first High School theatre groups to be allowed to perform the musical SIX: TEEN EDITION

== Academics and rankings ==
Because Crofton High School is still new, it has not yet appeared in some lists of high school rankings—such as US News and World Report's list of best high schools. However, Crofton High School is currently ranked #19 in the entire state of Maryland by SchoolDigger. In addition, Crofton High is rated an 8/10 by GreatSchools and has a 4 out of 5 star rating from the Maryland State Department of Education.
