= Arundel High School =

Public high school in Maryland, USA

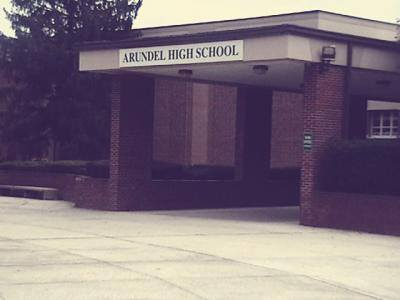

Location
- 1001 Annapolis Road; Gambrills, Maryland 21054; United States; 39°4′27.34″N 76°40′49.31″W

Information
- Type: Public secondary
- Motto: Mihi curui futuri
- Established: 1854
- Principal: Kimberly Winterbottom
- Teaching staff: 92.76 (on an FTE basis)
- Grades: 9–12
- Gender: Co-ed
- Enrollment: 1,778 (2024–25)
- Student to teacher ratio: 17.74
- Hours in school day: 8:30am – 3:18pm
- Campus type: Large suburb
- Colors: Kelly green and white
- Mascot: "Archie the Wildcat"
- Newspaper: The Pulse
- Yearbook: Panorama
- Website: www.arundelhigh.org

Arundel High School is a public high school located in Gambrills, Maryland, a suburb of Baltimore located in Anne Arundel County. The school is part of the Anne Arundel County Public School system, and is the primary high school for Gambrills and portions of the Odenton and Crofton areas.

Originally, the school was the Anne Arundel Academy, a prestigious one-room private school founded in 1854. That institution became Arundel High School in 1926. It is one of the oldest public high schools in the country. The current school building was built in 1949 and first occupied in 1950, with additions/renovations in 1966, 1986, 1987, 2006, and 2008.

== Students ==
=== Attendance ===
Arundel High School's September enrollments, 2004–2022:

Year	Students
2022	1,617
2021	1,733
2020	1,876
2019	2,203
2018	2,132
2017	2,118
2016	2,089
2015	2,043
2014	2,021
2013	1,963
2012	1,949
2011	1,972
2010	1,887
2009	1,910
2008	1,942
2007	1,993
2006	2,095
2005	2,072
2004	1,973

Arundel High School only has one feeder middle school, Arundel Middle School. Arundel Middle School has 6 feeder elementary schools: Four Seasons, Nantucket, Odenton, Piney Orchard, Two Rivers, and Waugh Chapel.

As per the approved Phase II redistricting plan that was approved by the AACPS Board of Education on November 19, 2025, a portion of students attending Nantucket Elementary School in Crofton will feed to Arundel Middle and High Schools beginning in the 2026-2027 school year.

As of 2024 the student body is 37.8% White, 32.4% Black, 13.0% Hispanic and Latino, 5.7% Asian, and 10.7% of students identify as being of two or more races, with 23.8% of students being eligible for free or reduced–price meals.

== Academics and rankings ==
=== Rankings ===
Arundel High School frequently ranks among the top high schools in AACPS and the state of Maryland:

- Currently, in 2023, Arundel High School is ranked as the 18th best high school in the state of Maryland and the 2nd best comprehensive high school in AACPS by schooldigger.com
- As of 2023, Arundel High School is rated a 9/10 overall and has a college readiness rating of 9/10 on GreatSchools, the leading school rating website in the United States.
- In 2013, Newsweek ranked Arundel High School as the 2nd best high school in Anne Arundel County and one of the top 20 high schools in Maryland. Arundel was placed in the top 5% of public high schools in the United States.
- In 2012 and 2013, Arundel High School was ranked as one of the DC area's most challenging high schools by the Washington Post. Arundel ranked in the top 5% of the most challenging high schools in the country. The criteria for the ratings measured college readiness by comparing AP participation rates at different high schools.
- In 2015, Arundel High School was among the top 15 high schools in Maryland and top 1,000 in the country (out of 26,000 public high schools) by U.S. News & World Report and in 2015 was ranked as the 2nd best among high schools in Anne Arundel County.
- In the latest 2019 ratings, Arundel High School received a 4-star rating by the Maryland State Department of Education, which began assigning schools a star rating out of 5 in 2018. Arundel High School, Arundel Middle School, and the four elementary feeder schools (collectively referred to as the “Arundel cluster”) had the third best scores of any cluster in Anne Arundel County. Arundel Middle and Odenton Elementary also received 4-star ratings, while Piney Orchard, Four Seasons, and Waugh Chapel Elementary Schools received 5/5 star ratings. The Severna Park cluster ranked as the best in the county and the Broadneck cluster ranked as the 2nd best in the county.
- As of 2025, Arundel High School was ranked in the top 10% of public high schools in the United States by U.S. News & World Report.
- As of 2021, Arundel High School has the second highest equity rating of all non-charter public high schools in Anne Arundel County on GreatSchools, with the first highest being Severna Park High. The equity section measures the academic performance of underserved students relative to the state average in a given school, as well as how well schools are closing the academic achievement gap.

== Athletics ==
Arundel High School competes in the Anne Arundel County Division of Maryland's 4A subdivision

Arundel High has won 36 State Championships dating back to 1908 in various sports:

- Baseball – 1976, 1977, 1981, 1987, 1991, 1993, 1995, 1998, 2001, 2006
- Boys Basketball – 1964
- Boys Lacrosse – 1980, 1981, 1995
- Boys Soccer – 1987
- Boys Track and Field – 1970, 1971
- Fall Cheerleading – 2016, 2021
- Football – 1976, 2024
- Girls Basketball – 1996, 2000, 2004, 2010
- Golf – 1991, 1992
- Softball – 1983
- Unified Bocce – 2012, 2017
- Wrestling – 1985,1998
- Wrestling Duals – 1997
- Volleyball – 1953, 2019, 2021

== Notable alumni ==
- Anthony Clark Arend (1976) - academic, international relations scholar
- Stephen Bainbridge (1980) – law professor at UCLA Law School, blogger
- Kyle Beckerman (2000) – Major League Soccer midfielder
- Elizabeth Ann Bennett – film and television actress
- Jill E. Brown – first female African-American pilot for a major American passenger airline
- Louis Carter (1971) – National Football League player
- Crystal Chappell (1983) – actress
- Jackson Dean (2019) – country singer
- Zinhle Essamuah (2012) – journalist and news anchor for NBC News Daily
- Steven Thomas Fischer (1990) – two-time Emmy Award nominated filmmaker and cartoonist
- R. J. Harris (2010) – Canadian Football League wide receiver
- Dave Johnson (1982) — play-by-play announcer for the Washington Wizards
- Chris Kubasik (1979) – former president and CEO of Lockheed Martin Corporation
- Alec Lemon (2009) – wide receiver in the NFL, Houston Texans
- Darnerien McCants (1996) – NFL wide receiver
- Mark McEwen (1972) – TV personality
- Denny Neagle (1986) – Major League Baseball pitcher
- Edward Snowden – NSA whistleblower, dropped out midway through the 1998–1999 school year
- Wanda Sykes (1982) – comedian
- Wilglory Tanjong (2014) – businesswoman, CEO/founder of Anima Iris, a handbag company
