= Linthicum Walks =

- U.S. National Register of Historic Places
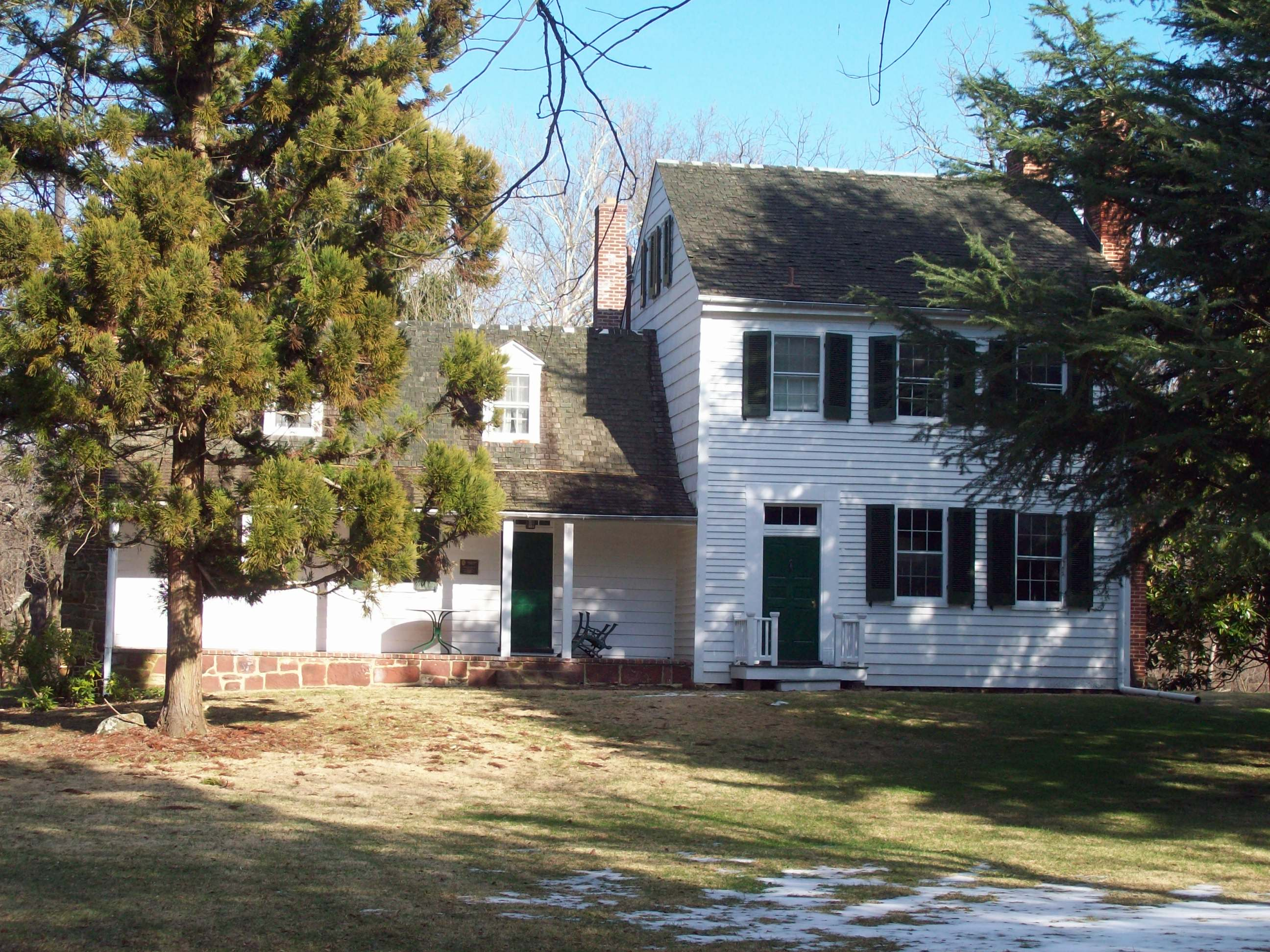
- Linthicum Walks, December 2009

- Location within Maryland Location within the United States
- Location: 2295 Davidsonville Road; Gambrills, Maryland 21054
- Nearest city: Crofton, Maryland
- Coordinates: 38°59′56″N 76°40′15″W
- Area: 5.2 acres (2.1 ha)
- NRHP reference No.: 84001344
- Added to NRHP: August 9, 1984

Linthicum Walks is a historic home and farm complex at Crofton, Anne Arundel County, Maryland, USA. It consists of a 19th-century frame dwelling (part of which may be 18th century), a mid-19th century meathouse, a frame pre-1815 tobacco barn and a family cemetery dating to the mid 19th century.

The complex is representative of the vernacular architecture of rural Tidewater Maryland of the late 18th through mid 19th centuries. The tobacco house is especially noteworthy, as one of only three pre-1815 tobacco houses surviving in the county.

It was listed on the National Register of Historic Places in 1984.

The arboretum at Historic Linthicum Walks was accredited as an ArbNet Level 1 Arboretum in August 2016. Highlights are the Cedrus atlantica (Blue Atlas cedar) and Cryptomeria japonica (Japanese cedar), plus specimens including Chinese elm, dogwood, holly, magnolia and maple.
