= Gambrills, Maryland =

Census-designated place in Maryland, U.S.

- Census-designated place
- Location in Maryland Gambrills (the United States)
- Coordinates: 39°05′06″N 76°39′19″W
- Country: United States
- State: Maryland
- County: Anne Arundel

Area
  - Total: 7.59 sq mi (19.67 km^{2})
  - Land: 7.59 sq mi (19.67 km^{2})
  - Water: 0 sq mi (0.00 km^{2})
- Elevation: 90 ft (27 m)

Population (2020)
  - Total: 3,034
  - Density: 399.4/sq mi (154.22/km^{2})
- Time zone: UTC-5 (Eastern (EST))
  - Summer (DST): UTC-4 (EDT)
- ZIP code: 21054
- FIPS code: 24-31350
- GNIS feature ID: 2583626

Gambrills refers to two neighboring places in Anne Arundel County, Maryland, United States, located in the Annapolis metro area: the unincorporated community of Gambrills, and the Gambrills census-designated place (CDP). The area was named after Augustine Gambrill, a plantation owner. The CDP covers an expansive range that falls within the communities of Crofton, Waugh Chapel, and Odenton. It also borders Davidsonville, Crownsville, Millersville, and Prince George's County, Maryland.

== History ==
The original village of Gambrills was located on Annapolis Road, 2 miles (3 km) southeast of the center of Odenton. Today, it is an unincorporated, census-designated place. It is the location of Whites Hall Farm, the birthplace and boyhood home of Maryland native Johns Hopkins.

== Demographics ==
Historical population
Census	Pop.	Note	%±
2010	2,800		—
2020	3,034		8.4%
2021 (est.)	3,185	▲	5.0%
U.S. Decennial Census

=== 2020 census ===
As of the 2020 census, Gambrills had a population of 3,034. The median age was 42.8 years. 21.1% of residents were under the age of 18 and 15.6% of residents were 65 years of age or older. For every 100 females there were 98.0 males, and for every 100 females age 18 and over there were 97.8 males age 18 and over.

58.5% of residents lived in urban areas, while 41.5% lived in rural areas.

There were 1,055 households in Gambrills, of which 39.5% had children under the age of 18 living in them. Of all households, 66.9% were married-couple households, 12.5% were households with a male householder and no spouse or partner present, and 15.1% were households with a female householder and no spouse or partner present. About 15.1% of all households were made up of individuals and 6.2% had someone living alone who was 65 years of age or older.

There were 1,079 housing units, of which 2.2% were vacant. The homeowner vacancy rate was 0.1% and the rental vacancy rate was 2.9%.

Racial composition as of the 2020 census
Race	Number	Percent
White	2,145	70.7%
Black or African American	347	11.4%
American Indian and Alaska Native	2	0.1%
Asian	196	6.5%
Native Hawaiian and Other Pacific Islander	0	0.0%
Some other race	79	2.6%
Two or more races	265	8.7%
Hispanic or Latino (of any race)	199	6.6%

=== Demographic estimates ===
Unincorporated Gambrills has an estimated population of 3,185 as of 2021. In 2022, the population of the CDP was 2,837.

=== Income and poverty ===
The median-income of residents was $140,238.

== Transportation ==
Gambrills is served by routes 3, 32, and MARC, the Maryland commuter rail service. There is a MARC station in neighboring Odenton. Gambrills is located along Maryland Route 175 (Annapolis Road), and extends south and southeast around the town of Crofton.

== Retail ==
Gambrills is the site of two large power centers adjacent to one another: Waugh Chapel Towne Centre (650,000 sq. ft.) part of a 1.2 million square foot mixed-use development, and the Village at Waugh Chapel (357,000 square feet).

== Schools ==
The area is served by the following schools:

- Crofton Elementary School (Crofton, Maryland)
- Crofton Woods Elementary School (Crofton, Maryland)
- Crofton Meadows Elementary School (Crofton, Maryland)
- Millersville Elementary School (Millersville, Maryland)
- Nantucket Elementary School ((Crofton, Maryland))
- Four Seasons Elementary School (Gambrills, Maryland)
- Odenton Elementary School (Odenton, Maryland)
- Waugh Chapel Elementary School (Odenton, Maryland)
- School of the Incarnation (Gambrills, Maryland)
- Crofton Middle School (Gambrills, Maryland)
- Arundel Middle School (Odenton, Maryland)
- Old Mill Middle School South (Millersville)
- Arundel High School (Gambrills, Maryland)
- Crofton High School (Gambrills, Maryland)
- Old Mill High School (Millersville)

== Notable residents ==
- Johns Hopkins – businessman involved in the building of the B&O Railroad, founded Johns Hopkins University and Johns Hopkins Hospital was born in Gambrills.
