= Live PD season 1 =

Live PD
- Season 1
- Starring: Dan Abrams; Tom Morris Jr.
- No. of episodes: 62 (1 cancelled)

Release
- Original network: A&E
- Original release: October 28, 2016 – August 19, 2017

Season chronology
- Next → Season 2

The first season of the television series Live PD began airing October 28, 2016, on A&E in the United States. The season concluded on August 19, 2017, and contained 62 episodes including one cancelled episode.

== Departments ==
Departments debuting in season one

- Arizona Department of Public Safety
- Bridgeport (CT) Police Department
- Richland County (SC) Sheriff's Office
- Tulsa (OK) Police Department
- Utah Highway Patrol/Utah State Bureau of Investigation
- Walton County (FL) Sheriff's Office
- Warren County (KY) Sheriff's Office
- Mission (TX) Police Department
- Midland County (TX) Sheriff's Office
- Edmonson County (KY) Sheriff's Office
- Calvert County (MD) Sheriff's Office
- Logan County (KY) Sheriff's Department
- St. Tammany Parish (LA) Sheriff's Office
- Clark County (IN) Sheriff's Office
- Santa Rosa County (FL) Sheriff's Office
- Greenville County (SC) Sheriff's Office
- Jeffersonville (IN) Police Department
- Wakulla County (FL) Sheriff's Office
- Spokane County (WA) Sheriff's Office
- Lake County (IL) Sheriff's Office

italics indicates a department returned for season two

== Episodes ==
No. overall	No. in season	Title	Original release date	U.S. viewers (millions)
1	1	"10.28.16"	October 28, 2016	0.776
Analysts: Detective Kevin Jackson and Detective Rich Emberlin from the Dallas Police Department; Departments and officers featured include: Arizona Department of Public Safety, Bridgeport (CT) Police Department (Ofc. Mark Blackwell & Sgt. Stacey Lyons), Richland County (SC) Sheriff's Department (Lt. Danny Brown & Dep. Robert Hook), Tulsa (OK) Police Department (Sgt. Sean Larkin, Ofc. Josh Dupler, & Ofc. Brad Blackwell), Utah Highway Patrol (Sgt. David Moreno), and Walton County (FL) Sheriff's Office (Dep. Chad Biernacki & Sgt. Bart Smith)
2	2	"11.04.16"	November 4, 2016	0.728
Analysts: Detective Kevin Jackson and Detective Rich Emberlin from the Dallas Police Department; Departments and officers featured include: Arizona Department of Public Safety: (Tpr. Andy Reed), Bridgeport (CT) Police Department (Ofc. Mark Blackwell), Richland County (SC) Sheriff's Department (Lt. Danny Brown & Sgt. Steven Tapler), Tulsa (OK) Police Department (Sgt. Sean Larkin, Ofc. Josh Dupler, & Ofc. Brad Blackwell), Utah Highway Patrol (Sgt. Steve Salas with K9 Duke, Sgt. Mary Kaye Morris Lucas, & Cpl. Cody McCoy), and Walton County (FL) Sheriff's Office (Dep. Chad Biernacki, Sgt. Bart Smith, Dep. Damon Byrd, & Sgt. Cory Webster)
3	3	"11.11.16"	November 11, 2016	0.831
Analyst: James Sheppard, former chief of the Rochester Police Department; Departments and officers featured include: Arizona Department of Public Safety (Tpr. James Casey), Bridgeport (CT) Police Department (Ofc. Mark Blackwell, Sgt. Chris Robinson, Ofc. Ashley Taylor, & Sgt. Eddie Golding), Richland County (SC) Sheriff's Department (Sgt. Steven Tapler & Inv. Chavis Hall), Tulsa (OK) Police Department (Sgt. Sean Larkin, Ofc. Josh Dupler, & Ofc. Brad Blackwell), Utah Highway Patrol (Sgt. David Moreno, Sgt. Steve Salas with K9 Duke, & Sgt. Mary Kaye Morris Lucas), and Walton County (FL) Sheriff's Office (Dep. Khaliqa Wheatley, Dep. Chad Biernacki, & Sgt. Bart Smith)
4	4	"11.17.16"	November 17, 2016	0.790
Analyst: James Sheppard, former chief of the Rochester Police Department; Departments and officers featured include: Arizona Department of Public Safety (Tpr. James Casey & Tpr. Todd Poole), Bridgeport (CT) Police Department (Ofc. Mark Blackwell, Sgt. Chris Robinson, Ofc. Ashley Taylor, & Ofc. Jorge Larregui), Richland County (SC) Sheriff's Department (Cap. Michael Pritchett & Lt. Danny Brown), Tulsa (OK) Police Department (Sgt. Sean Larkin, Ofc. Josh Dupler, & Ofc. Brad Blackwell), Utah Highway Patrol (Sgt. David Moreno, Sgt. Mary Kaye Morris Lucas, & Cpl. Cody McCoy), and Walton County (FL) Sheriff's Office (Dep. Chad Biernacki & Dep. Khaliqa Wheatley); Special Thursday episode
5	5	"11.18.16"	November 18, 2016	0.786
Analyst: James Sheppard, former chief of the Rochester Police Department; Departments and officers featured include: Arizona Department of Public Safety (Tpr. James Casey & Tpr. Todd Poole), Bridgeport (CT) Police Department (Ofc. Mark Blackwell, Sgt. Chris Robinson, & Sgt. Paul Scillia), Richland County (SC) Sheriff's Department (Dep. Kevin Lawrence & Sgt. Steven Tapler), Tulsa (OK) Police Department (Sgt. Sean Larkin, Ofc. Josh Dupler, & Ofc. Brad Blackwell), Utah Highway Patrol (Sgt. David Moreno, Sgt. Mary Kaye Morris Lucas, & Sgt. Steve Salas with K9 Duke), and Walton County (FL) Sheriff's Office (Dep. Chad Biernacki, Dep. Khaliqa Wheatley, Dep. Tabitha Lewis, & Sgt. Cory Webster)
6	6	"11.25.16"	November 25, 2016	0.852
Analyst: James Sheppard, former chief of the Rochester Police Department; First three hour episode. All previous episodes were two hours in length.; Departments and officers featured include: Arizona Department of Public Safety (Tpr. James Casey & Tpr. Todd Poole), Bridgeport (CT) Police Department (Ofc. Mark Blackwell & Sgt. Chris Robinson), Richland County (SC) Sheriff's Department (Sgt. Steven Tapler & Dep. Kevin Lawrence), Tulsa (OK) Police Department (Sgt. Sean Larkin, Ofc. Josh Dupler, & Ofc. Brad Blackwell), Utah Highway Patrol (Sgt. Mary Kaye Morris Lucas, & Sgt. Donavan Lucas), and Walton County (FL) Sheriff's Office (Dep. Chad Biernacki, Dep. Khaliqa Wheatley, Sgt. Cory Webster, & Dep. Alyssa Dossey)
7	7	"12.02.16"	December 2, 2016	0.936
Analyst: James Sheppard, former chief of the Rochester Police Department; Departments and officers featured include: Arizona Department of Public Safety (Tpr. James Casey & Tpr. Kristen Wright), Bridgeport (CT) Police Department (Ofc. Mark Blackwell, Sgt. Chris Robinson, & Ofc. Ashley Taylor), Richland County (SC) Sheriff's Department (Lt. Danny Brown & Dep. Kevin Lawrence), Tulsa (OK) Police Department (Sgt. Sean Larkin, Ofc. Josh Dupler, Ofc. Brad Blackwell, Sgt. Brian Hill, & Ofc. Danny Bean), Utah Highway Patrol (Sgt. David Moreno & Sgt. Steve Salas with K9 Duke), and Walton County (FL) Sheriff's Office (Sgt. Bart Smith & Dep. Khaliqa Wheatley)
8	8	"12.09.16"	December 9, 2016	0.894
Analyst: James Sheppard, former chief of the Rochester Police Department; Departments and officers featured include: Warren County (KY) Sheriff's Office (Dep. Aaron Poynter) Bridgeport (CT) Police Department (Ofc. Mark Blackwell, Sgt. Chris Robinson, & Ofc. Ashley Taylor), Richland County (SC) Sheriff's Department (Sgt. Steven Tapler & Dep. Kevin Lawrence), Tulsa (OK) Police Department (Sgt. Sean Larkin, Ofc. Josh Dupler, & Ofc. Brad Blackwell), Utah Highway Patrol (Sgt. David Moreno, Sgt. Steve Salas with K9 Duke, and Sgt. Donavan Lucas), Walton County (FL) Sheriff's Office (Dep. Khaliqa Wheatley & Dep. Josh Bennett), and Arizona Department of Public Safety (Tpr. James Casey & Tpr. Todd Poole)
9	9	"12.16.16"	December 16, 2016	1.192
Tom Morris, Jr., veteran crime reporter and former Washington DC special police officer, makes his first appearance as an analyst; Departments and officers featured include: Arizona Department of Public Safety (Tpr. James Casey & Tpr. Todd Poole), Warren County (KY) Sheriff's Office (Sgt. Bill Stephens, Dep. Sam Scarborough, & Dep. Andrew Stidham), Richland County (SC) Sheriff's Department (Lt. Danny Brown & Dep. Kevin Lawrence), Tulsa (OK) Police Department (Sgt. Sean Larkin, Ofc. Brad Blackwell, Ofc. Josh Dupler, Ofc. Justin Beal, & Ofc. Ryan Rogers), Utah Highway Patrol (Cpl. Cody McCoy, Sgt. Mary Kaye Morris Lucas, & Sgt. Steve Salas with K9 Duke), Walton County (FL) Sheriff's Office (Dep. Chad Biernacki, Dep. Khaliqa Wheatley, & Sgt. Cory Webster), and Bridgeport (CT) Police Department (Ofc. Luis Pomales, Ofc. Mark Blackwell, Ofc. John Cholakian, & Ofc. John Pachera)
10	10	"01.06.17"	January 6, 2017	1.081
Departments and officers featured include: Arizona Department of Public Safety (Tpr. Kristen Wright & Tpr. James Casey), Warren County (KY) Sheriff's Office (Dep. Sam Scarborough), Richland County (SC) Sheriff's Department (Lt. Danny Brown, Dep. Kevin Lawrence & Dep. Chris Mastrianni), Tulsa (OK) Police Department (Sgt. Sean Larkin, Ofc. Brad Blackwell, Ofc. Justin Beal, Ofc. Stephen Blaylock, Ofc. Brent Barnhart, & Ofc. Ryan Rogers), Mission (TX) Police Department (Ofc. Joe Espericueta, Ofc. John Oliva, & Ofc. Randy Davila), Walton County (FL) Sheriff's Office (Dep. Khaliqa Wheatley), and Utah Highway Patrol (Sgt. David Moreno & Cpl. Cody McCoy)
11	11	"01.13.17"	January 13, 2017	1.124
Departments and officers featured include: Arizona Department of Public Safety (Tpr. James Casey & Tpr. Todd Poole), Warren County (KY) Sheriff's Office (Dep. Wes Jenkins, Dep. Aaron Poynter, & Dep. Sam Scarborough), Richland County (SC) Sheriff's Department (Dep. Kevin Lawrence, Dep. Chris Mastrianni, & M/D Mark Laureano), Tulsa (OK) Police Department (Sgt. Sean Larkin, Ofc. Brad Blackwell, & Ofc. Justin Beal), Mission (TX) Police Department (Ofc. Joe Espericueta), and Walton County (FL) Sheriff's Office (Sgt. Cory Webster, Dep. Chad Biernacki, & Dep. Oscar D'Lassalas)
12	12	"01.20.17"	January 20, 2017	1.009
Departments and officers featured include: Arizona Department of Public Safety (Tpr. Todd Poole, Tpr. James Casey, & Tpr. Kristen Wright), Warren County (KY) Sheriff's Office (Dep. Wes Jenkins & Dep. Sam Scarborough), Richland County (SC) Sheriff's Department (Dep. Kevin Lawrence, Dep. Chris Mastrianni, Lt. Danny Brown, & M/D Mark Laureano), Tulsa (OK) Police Department (Sgt. Sean Larkin, Ofc. Brad Blackwell, Ofc. Stephen Blaylock, Ofc. Brent Barnhart, & Ofc. Justin Beal), Midland County (TX) Sheriff's Office (Sgt. Casey O'Donnell), Walton County (FL) Sheriff's Office (Sgt. Bart Smith, Dep. Heather Berbert, & Sgt. Cory Webster), and Mission (TX) Police Department (Ofc. Juan Mercado)
13	13	"01.27.17"	January 27, 2017	1.086
Departments and officers featured include: Arizona Department of Public Safety (Tpr. James Casey & Tpr. Todd Poole), Warren County (KY) Sheriff's Office (Dep. Wes Jenkins, Dep. Shane Montgomery, & Sgt. William Stephens), Richland County (SC) Sheriff's Department (Dep. Kevin Lawrence & Lt. Danny Brown), Tulsa (OK) Police Department (Sgt. Sean Larkin, Ofc. Brad Blackwell, Ofc. Stephen Blaylock, & Ofc. Brent Barnhart), Mission (TX) Police Department (Ofc. Juan Mercado & Ofc. Joe Espericueta), Walton County (FL) Sheriff's Office (Dep. Chad Biernacki, Dep. Khaliqa Wheatley, & Sgt. Cory Webster), and Utah Highway Patrol (Cpl. Cody McCoy & Sgt. Mary Kaye Morris Lucas)
14	14	"02.03.17"	February 3, 2017	0.998
Guest analyst: Sgt. Sean "Sticks" Larkin of the Tulsa (OK) Police Department Gang Unit; Departments and officers featured include: Arizona Department of Public Safety (Tpr. Todd Poole & Tpr. James Casey), Edmonson County (KY) Sheriff's Office (Sheriff Shane A. Doyle), Richland County (SC) Sheriff's Department (Lt. Danny Brown, Sgt. Steven Tapler, & Dep. Chris Mastrianni), Calvert County (MD) Sheriff's Office (Dfc. Tim Mohler, Dfc. JD Denton, & Cpl. Tony Moschetto), Mission (TX) Police Department (Ofc. Juan Mercado & Ofc. John Oliva), Walton County (FL) Sheriff's Office (Sgt. Johnny Whitaker, Dep. Khaliqa Wheatley, Dep. Blaze Miller, Dep. Chad Biernacki, Dep. David Renna, & Sgt. Justin Stevens), and Tulsa (OK) Police Department (Ofc. Justin Beal, Ofc. Stephen Blaylock, Ofc. Brent Barnhart, & Ofc. Josh Dupler)
15	15	"02.04.17"	February 4, 2017	1.036
Guest analyst: Sgt. Sean "Sticks" Larkin of the Tulsa (OK) Police Department Gang Unit; Departments and officers featured include: Arizona Department of Public Safety (Tpr. Steven Jacobs & Tpr. James Casey), Edmonson County (KY) Sheriff's Office (Sheriff Shane A. Doyle & Det. Wally Ritter), Richland County (SC) Sheriff's Department (Dep. Kevin Lawrence, Dep. Chris Mastrianni, & Cpl. Gavin Walmsley), Calvert County (MD) Sheriff's Office (Dfc. JD Denton, Cpl. Tony Moschetto, & Dep. Dean Naughton), Mission (TX) Police Department (Ofc. Juan Mercado), Midland County (TX) Sheriff's Office (Dep. Cassandra Nunez & Dep. Andrew Shephard), Tulsa (OK) Police Department (Ofc. Brent Barnhart & Ofc. Ryan Rogers), Warren County (KY) Sheriff's Office (Dep. Andrew Stidham & Dep. Shane Montgomery), and Walton County (FL) Sheriff's Office (Dep. Blaze Miller); First Saturday episode
16	16	"02.10.17"	February 10, 2017	1.116
Guest analyst: Sgt. Sean "Sticks" Larkin of the Tulsa (OK) Police Department Gang Unit; Departments and officers featured include: Arizona Department of Public Safety (Tpr. James Casey & Tpr. Todd Poole), Logan County (KY) Sheriff's Department (Sgt. Clint Wright), Richland County (SC) Sheriff's Department (Dep. Kevin Lawrence, Dep. Chris Mastrianni, & M/D Marcus Kim), Calvert County (MD) Sheriff's Office (Dfc. JD Denton), St. Tammany Parish Sheriff's Office, Midland County (TX) Sheriff's Office (Dep. Matthew Awbrey & Dep. Cassandra Nunez), Tulsa (OK) Police Department (Ofc. Brent Barnhart & Ofc. Stephen Blaylock), Mission (TX) Police Department (Ofc. John Oliva), and Walton County (FL) Sheriff's Office (Dep. Oscar D'Lassalas)
17	17	"02.11.17"	February 11, 2017	1.076
Guest analyst: Sgt. Sean "Sticks" Larkin of the Tulsa (OK) Police Department Gang Unit; Departments and officers featured include: Arizona Department of Public Safety (Tpr. James Casey, Tpr. Steven Jacobs, Tpr. Kayla Fee, & Tpr. Todd Poole), Mission (TX) Police Department (Ofc. Juan Mercado & Ofc. John Oliva), Richland County (SC) Sheriff's Department (Sgt. Steven Tapler, Lt. Curtis Wilson, Lt. Danny Brown, & Dep. Chris Mastrianni), Calvert County (MD) Sheriff's Office (Dfc. JD Denton), St. Tammany Parish Sheriff's Office (Dep. Jason Walden & Dep. Ricky Steinert), Walton County (FL) Sheriff's Office (Dep. Kristin Pond with K9 Kayne, Dep. Frank Guillory & Sgt. Allen Pullings), Midland County (TX) Sheriff's Office (Dep. Matthew Awbrey & Dep. Cassandra Nunez), Tulsa (OK) Police Department (Sgt. Sean Larkin), and Warren County (KY) Sheriff's Office (Dep. Eric Bull)
18	18	"02.17.17"	February 17, 2017	1.014
Departments and officers featured include: Arizona Department of Public Safety (Tpr. Todd Poole, Tpr. James Casey, & Tpr. Steven Jacobs), Mission (TX) Police Department (Ofc. John Oliva & Ofc. Juan Mercado), Richland County (SC) Sheriff's Department (Dep. Kevin Lawrence, Dep. Chris Mastrianni, Lt. Curtis Wilson, Sgt. Steven Tapler, & Lt. Danny Brown), Calvert County (MD) Sheriff's Office (Dfc. Troy Holt, Dfc. JD Denton, & Cpl. Tony Moschetto), St. Tammany Parish Sheriff's Office (Sgt. Trinity Graves & Dep. Jason Walden), Walton County (FL) Sheriff's Office (Dep. Chad Biernacki), Midland County (TX) Sheriff's Office (Sgt. Casey O'Donnell), Edmonton County Sheriff's Office (Det. Wally Ritter), and Bridgeport (CT) Police Department (Ofc. Mike Paoleti)
19	19	"02.24.17"	February 24, 2017	1.034
Departments and officers featured include: Arizona Department of Public Safety (Tpr. Todd Poole & Tpr. James Casey), Mission (TX) Police Department (Ofc. Juan Mercado), Richland County (SC) Sheriff's Department (Dep. Chris Mastrianni & Dep. Kevin Lawrence), Calvert County (MD) Sheriff's Office (Cpl. Tony Moschetto & Dfc. JD Denton), St. Tammany Parish Sheriff's Office (Dep. Ricky Steinert, Sgt. Jason Prieto & Det. Bill Johnson), Clark County (IN) Sheriff's Office (Cpl. Erik Elliott & Ofc. Wes Harper), and Midland County (TX) Sheriff's Office (Dep. Andrew Shepard, Dep. John Reese, & Dep. Cassandra Nunez)
20	20	"03.03.17"	March 3, 2017	1.081
Departments and officers featured include: Arizona Department of Public Safety (Tpr. James Casey), Mission (TX) Police Department (Ofc. Juan Mercado, Ofc. Rey Garza, & Ofc. John Oliva), Richland County (SC) Sheriff's Department (Dep. Kevin Lawrence, Dep. Chris Mastrianni, Cpl. Gavin Walmsley with K9 Rico, & Sgt. Steven Tapler), Calvert County (MD) Sheriff's Office (Dfc. JD Denton & Cpl. Tony Moschetto), St. Tammany Parish Sheriff's Office (Dep. Ricky Steinert & Sgt. Trinity Graves), and Walton County (FL) Sheriff's Office (Dep. Chad Biernacki, Sgt. Cory Webster, Sgt. Johnny Whitaker, & Dep. Kristin Pond with K9 Kayne)
21	21	"03.04.17"	March 4, 2017	0.989
Departments and officers featured include: Arizona Department of Public Safety (Tpr. James Casey, Tpr. Steven Jacobs, & Tpr. Todd Poole), Clark County (IN) Sheriff's Office (Cpl. Erik Elliott & Lt. Mark Meyer), Richland County (SC) Sheriff's Department (Dep. Keenan Johnson, Sgt. Steven Tapler, & Lt. Danny Brown), Calvert County (MD) Sheriff's Office (Dfc. Troy Holt, Cpl. Tony Moschetto, & Dfc. JD Denton), St. Tammany Parish Sheriff's Office (Dep. Ricky Steinert & Sgt. Trinity Graves), Walton County (FL) Sheriff's Office (Dep. Chad Biernacki & Dep. Oscar D'Lassalas), Midland County (TX) Sheriff's Office (Dep. Robert Strahan), and Mission (TX) Police Department (Ofc. Juan Mercado)
22	22	"03.10.17"	March 10, 2017	1.082
Departments and officers featured include: Arizona Department of Public Safety (Tpr. James Casey, Tpr. Todd Poole, & Tpr. Dave Callister), Mission (TX) Police Department (Ofc. John Oliva & Ofc. Juan Mercado), Richland County (SC) Sheriff's Department (Dep. Kevin Lawrence & Dep. Chris Mastrianni), Calvert County (MD) Sheriff's Office (Dfc. Tim Mohler, Dfc. JD Denton, & Dfc. Troy Holt), St. Tammany Parish Sheriff's Office (Sgt. Trinity Graves & Sgt. Jeremy Church), Walton County (FL) Sheriff's Office (Sgt. Johnny Whitaker & Dep. Kristin Pond with K9 Kayne), Clark County (IN) Sheriff's Office (Lt. Mark Meyer & Ofc. Charlie Scott)
23	23	"03.11.17"	March 11, 2017	1.023
Departments and officers featured include: Arizona Department of Public Safety (Tpr. Steven Jacobs & Tpr. James Casey), Mission (TX) Police Department (Ofc. Juan Mercado & Ofc. John Oliva), Richland County (SC) Sheriff's Department (M/D Phillip Darnell & Cpl. James Abraham), Calvert County (MD) Sheriff's Office (Dfc. JD Denton & Dfc. Tim Mohler), St. Tammany Parish Sheriff's Office (Sgt. Trinity Graves, Sgt. Jeremy Church, & Dep. Justin Guy), Clark County (IN) Sheriff's Office (Cpl. Erik Elliott & Ofc. Barrett Cook), and Utah Highway Patrol (Sgt. Steve Salas with K9 Duke)
24	24	"03.17.17"	March 17, 2017	1.202
Departments and officers featured include: Arizona Department of Public Safety (Tpr. James Casey & Tpr. Todd Poole), Walton County (FL) Sheriff's Office (Dep. Chad Biernacki & Sgt. Cory Webster), Richland County (SC) Sheriff's Department (Dep. Kevin Lawrence & Dep. Keenan Johnson), Calvert County (MD) Sheriff's Office (Cpl. Tony Moschetto, Dfc. JD Denton & Dfc. Tim Mohler), St. Tammany Parish Sheriff's Office (Dep. Justin Guy, Sgt. Trinity Graves, Sgt. David Maki, & Dep. Bryce Morse), Clark County (IN) Sheriff's Office (Lt. Mark Meyer, Ofc. Charles Scott, Cpl. Erik Elliott & Ofc. Wes Harper)
25	25	"03.18.17"	March 18, 2017	1.295
Departments and officers featured include: Arizona Department of Public Safety (Tpr. Steven Jacobs, Tpr. James Casey & Tpr. Todd Poole), Walton County (FL) Sheriff's Office (Sgt. Johnny Whitaker, Dep. Kristin Pond with K9 Kayne & Dep. Chad Biernacki), Richland County (SC) Sheriff's Department (Dep. Chris Mastrianni & M/D Mark Laureano), Calvert County (MD) Sheriff's Office (Cpl. Tony Moschetto & Dfc. Troy Holt), Mission (TX) Police Department (Ofc. John oliva, Ofc Rey Garza, Ofc. Juan Mercado, & Ofc. Joe Espericueta), and Clark County (IN) Sheriff's Office (Cpl. Erik Elliott & Lt. Mark Meyer)
26	26	"03.24.17"	March 24, 2017	1.106
Departments and officers featured include: Arizona Department of Public Safety (Tpr. Todd Poole & Tpr. James Casey), Midland County (TX) Sheriff's Office (Dep. Bobby Neal & Dep. John Reese), Richland County (SC) Sheriff's Department (Dep. Kevin Lawrence & S/D Chris Mastrianni), Calvert County (MD) Sheriff's Office (Cpl. Tony Moschetto, Dfc. Tim Mohler, & Dfc. Dean Naughton), St. Tammany Parish Sheriff's Office (Dep. Ricky Steinert & Sgt. Jeremy Church), and Clark County (IN) Sheriff's Office
27	27	"03.25.17"	March 25, 2017	1.186
Departments and officers featured include: Arizona Department of Public Safety (Tpr. Todd Poole, Tpr. James Casey, & Tpr. Steven Jacobs), Mission (TX) Police Department (Ofc. Elias Munoz, Ofc. John Oliva, & Ofc. Juan Mercado), Walton County (FL) Sheriff's Office (Sgt. Johnny Whitaker, Dep. Kristin Pond with K9 Kayne, Dep. Blaze Miler, Sgt. Bart Smith, & Dep. Savannah Bush), Calvert County (MD) Sheriff's Office (Cpl. Tony Moschetto & Dfc. Tim Mohler), St. Tammany Parish Sheriff's Office (Dep. Justin Guy, Dep. Matthew Nelson, & Dep. Oscar Pacheco), and Clark County (IN) Sheriff's Office (Cpl. Erik Elliott & Lt. Mark Meyer)
28	28	"03.31.17"	March 31, 2017	1.310
Departments and officers featured include: Arizona Department of Public Safety (Tpr. James Casey & Tpr. Todd Poole), Mission (TX) Police Department (Ofc. John Oliva), Richland County (SC) Sheriff's Department (Lt. Danny Brown, Sgt. Steven Tapler, Lt. Curtis Wilson, & M/D Robert Hook) Calvert County (MD) Sheriff's Office (Dfc. Tim Mohler, Dfc. JD Denton, & Dep. Kirk Williamson), Midland County (TX) Sheriff's Office (Dep. Bobby Neal), Walton County (FL) Sheriff's Office (Dep. Chad Biernacki, Sgt. Bart Smith, & Sgt. Cory Webster), and Clark County (IN) Sheriff's Office (Cpl. Erik Elliott & Ofc. Wes Harper)
29	29	"04.07.17"	April 7, 2017	1.267
Departments and officers featured include: Arizona Department of Public Safety (Tpr. Todd Poole & Tpr. James Casey), Clark County (IN) Sheriff's Office (Ofc. Wes Harper & Cpl. Erik Elliott), Richland County (SC) Sheriff's Department (Dep. Kevin Lawrence & S/D Chris Mastrianni) Calvert County (MD) Sheriff's Office (Cpl. Tony Moschetto, Dfc. Tim Mohler, Dfc. JD Denton, & Dfc. Dean Naughton), Midland County (TX) Sheriff's Office (Dep. Bobby Neal, Dep. Chet Thatcher, & Dep. Robert Strahan), Santa Rosa County (FL) Sheriff's Office (Sgt. Roman Jackson, Dep. Chris Mann with K9 Zeus, Dep. Danny Miller, & Dep. Mason Doggette), and Mission (TX) Police Department (Ofc. John Oliva & Ofc. Juan Mercado)
30	30	"04.08.17"	April 8, 2017	1.204
Departments and officers featured include: Arizona Department of Public Safety (Tpr. Steven Jacobs, Tpr. James Casey, Tpr. John Begley, & Tpr. Todd Poole), Mission (TX) Police Department (Ofc. John Oliva, Ofc. Elias Munoz, Ofc. Alex Leal, & Ofc. Juan Mercado), Richland County (SC) Sheriff's Department (M/D Mark Laureano & Sgt. Steven Tapler) Calvert County (MD) Sheriff's Office (Dfc. JD Denton & Dfc. Tim Mohler), Greenville County (SC) Sheriff's Office (Dep. Alex Poag & Dep. Matt Broad), Walton County (FL) Sheriff's Office (Sgt. Johnny Whitaker & Dep. Blaze Miller), and Santa Rosa County (FL) Sheriff's Office (Dep. Chris Mann with K9 Zeus & Dep. Danny Miller)
31	31	"04.14.17"	April 14, 2017	1.301
Guest analyst: Sgt. Sean "Sticks" Larkin of the Tulsa (OK) Police Department Gang Unit; Departments and officers featured include: Logan County (KY) Sheriff's Department (Dep. Kyler Harvey), Mission (TX) Police Department (Ofc. John Oliva), Richland County (SC) Sheriff's Department (Dep. Kevin Lawrence & S/D Chris Mastrianni) Calvert County (MD) Sheriff's Office (Dfc. JD Denton, Cpl. Tony Moschetto, Dep. Kirk Williamson, & Dfc. Dean Naughton), Greenville County (SC) Sheriff's Office (Dep. Sam Thompson & Dep. Ryan Humburg), Walton County (FL) Sheriff's Office (Sgt. Johnny Whitaker & Dep. Kristin Pond with K9 Kayne), and Tulsa (OK) Police Department (Ofc. Chris "B-Real" Beyerl, Ofc. Shawn "Beavis" Hickey, Ofc. Justin Beal, & Ofc. Stephen Blaylock)
32	32	"04.15.17"	April 15, 2017	1.283
Guest analyst: Sgt. Sean "Sticks" Larkin of the Tulsa (OK) Police Department Gang Unit; Departments and officers featured include: Logan County (KY) Sheriff's Department (Sgt. Clint Wright & Dep. Kyler Harvey), Mission (TX) Police Department (Ofc. John Oliva & Ofc. Rey Garza), Richland County (SC) Sheriff's Department (M/D Mark Laureano & Sgt. Steven Tapler) Calvert County (MD) Sheriff's Office (Cpl. Tony Moschetto & 'DFC. JD Denton), Greenville County (SC) Sheriff's Office (Dep. Ryan Humburg), Walton County (FL) Sheriff's Office (Dep. Chad Biernacki), St. Tammany Parish Sheriff's Office (Dep. Oscar Pacheco), and Tulsa (OK) Police Department (Ofc. Justin Beal, Ofc. Kevin Warne, Ofc. Shane Pryce, & Ofc. Danny Bean)
33	33	"04.21.17"	April 21, 2017	1.265
Departments and officers featured include: Arizona Department of Public Safety (Tpr. Todd Poole & Tpr. James Casey), Mission (TX) Police Department (Ofc. John Oliva & Ofc. Juan Mercado), Richland County (SC) Sheriff's Department (Lt. Danny Brown & S/D Chris Mastrianni) Calvert County (MD) Sheriff's Office (Dfc. Troy Holt), Greenville County (SC) Sheriff's Office (Dep. Matt Broad, M/D Jonathan Parris & Dep. Alex Poag), Clark County (IN) Sheriff's Office (Cpl. Erik Elliott & Lt. Mark Meyer), Midland County (TX) Sheriff's Office (Dep. Leith Hill), Santa Rosa County (FL) Sheriff's Office (Dep. Chris Mann with K9 Zeus & Sgt. Roman Jackson), and Walton County (FL) Sheriff's Office (Dep. Chad Biernacki, Sgt. Bart Smith, & Dep. David Renna)
34	34	"04.22.17"	April 22, 2017	1.263
Departments and officers featured include: Arizona Department of Public Safety (Tpr. Todd Poole & Tpr. Steven Jacobs), Mission (TX) Police Department (Ofc. John Oliva & Ofc. Santiago Silva), Richland County (SC) Sheriff's Department (Lt. Danny Brown & Dep. Kevin Lawrence) Calvert County (MD) Sheriff's Office (Cpl. Tony Moschetto), Greenville County (SC) Sheriff's Office (M/D Jonathan Parris), Clark County (IN) Sheriff's Office (Lt. Mark Meyer & Cpl. Erik Elliott), Walton County (FL) Sheriff's Office (Sgt. Cory Webster, Dep. Blaze Miller, & Dep. Chad Biernacki), and Midland County (TX) Sheriff's Office (Dep. Alma Acosta)
35	35	"04.28.17"	April 28, 2017	1.282
Guest analyst: Deputy Kevin Lawrence of the Richland County (SC) Sheriff's Department; Departments and officers featured include: Arizona Department of Public Safety (Tpr. James Casey), Utah Highway Patrol (Sgt. David Moreno, Sgt. Steve Salas with K9 Duke, & Sgt. Mary Kaye Morris Lucas), Richland County (SC) Sheriff's Department (S/D David Farr, S/D Chris Mastrianni, Cpl. James Abraham, & Sgt. Steven Tapler) Calvert County (MD) Sheriff's Office (Cpl. Tony Moschetto), Greenville County (SC) Sheriff's Office (M/D Chad Ayers & Dep. Jimmy Pregel), Jeffersonville (IN) Police Department (Sgt. Denver Leverett with K9 Flex), Mission (TX) Police Department (Ofc. Javier Lara), Midland County (TX) Sheriff's Office (Dep. Alma Acosta), and Walton County (FL) Sheriff's Office (Sgt. Cory Webster, Dep. Blaze Miller, & Dep. Chad Biernacki)
36	36	"04.29.17"	April 29, 2017	1.555
Guest analyst: Deputy Kevin Lawrence of the Richland County (SC) Sheriff's Department; Departments and officers featured include: Arizona Department of Public Safety (Tpr. Steven Jacobs & Tpr. James Casey), Utah Highway Patrol (Sgt. Mary Kaye Morris Lucas & Sgt. Donavan Lucas), Mission (TX) Police Department (Ofc. Miguel Godinez & Ofc. Joe Espericueta) Calvert County (MD) Sheriff's Office (Dfc. Tim Mohler, Cpl. Tony Moschetto, & Dfc. Troy Holt), Greenville County (SC) Sheriff's Office (M/D Chad Ayers & Dep. Jimmy Pregel), Jeffersonville (IN) Police Department (Ofc. Drew Lydon & Ofc. Susan Woodard), and Clark County (IN) Sheriff's Office (Cpl. Erik Elliott)
37	37	"05.05.17"	May 5, 2017	1.426
Guest analyst: Sgt. Sean "Sticks" Larkin of the Tulsa (OK) Police Department Gang Unit; Departments and officers featured include: Arizona Department of Public Safety (Tpr. Steven Jacobs, Tpr. Todd Poole, & Tpr. Kevin Watt), Utah Highway Patrol (Sgt. David Moreno), Richland County (SC) Sheriff's Department (S/D Chris Mastrianni & Dep. Kevin Lawrence) Clark County (IN) Sheriff's Office (Cpl. Erik Elliott, Ofc. Wes Harper, Lt. Mark Meyer, Ofc. Charles Scott, & Ofc. AJ Vissing), Greenville County (SC) Sheriff's Office (Dep. Alex Edwards, Dep. Ryan Gibson, Dep. Mason Hubber, Dep. Matt Broad, & M/D Jonathan Parris), Mission (TX) Police Department (Ofc. Joe Esperacueta), Walton County (FL) Sheriff's Office (Dep. Chad Biernacki), and Midland County (TX) Sheriff's Office (Dep. Timothy Roberts & Dep. Cassandra Nunez)
38	38	"05.06.17"	May 6, 2017	1.466
Guest analyst: Sgt. Sean "Sticks" Larkin of the Tulsa (OK) Police Department Gang Unit; Departments and officers featured include: Arizona Department of Public Safety (Tpr. Todd Poole), Utah Highway Patrol (Sgt. Mary Kaye Morris Lucas & Sgt. Steve Salas with K9 Duke), Richland County (SC) Sheriff's Department (Dep. Kevin Lawrence, S/D Chris Mastrianni, S/D David Farr, & Dep. Jason Cuzzupe) Calvert County (MD) Sheriff's Office (Cpl. Tony Moschetto & Dfc. Tim Mohler), Greenville County (SC) Sheriff's Office (Dep. Matt Broad, Dep. Ryan Gibson, M/D Kevin Azzara & M/D Jonathan Parris), Mission (TX) Police Department (Ofc. Javier Lara, Ofc. John Oliva, & Ofc. Juan Mercado), Midland County (TX) Sheriff's Office (Dep. Jane Aranda)
39	39	"05.12.17"	May 12, 2017	1.198
Guest analysts: Col. Frank Milstead and Trooper James Casey of the Arizona Department of Public Safety; Departments and officers featured include: Jeffersonville (IN) Police Department (Ofc. Alyssa Wright), Utah Highway Patrol (Sgt. Mary Kaye Morris Lucas), Richland County (SC) Sheriff's Department (Dep. Kevin Lawrence, S/D Chris Mastrianni, Lt. Danny Brown, & S/D David Farr) Calvert County (MD) Sheriff's Office (Cpl. Tony Moschetto), Greenville County (SC) Sheriff's Office (M/D Ivan Rodriguez, Dep. Kyle Alexander, Dep. Tim Fuller, & Dep. Jessie Miller), Arizona Department of Public Safety (Det. Brandon Kinser & Tpr. Todd Poole), Clark County (IN) Sheriff's Office (Ofc. Wes Harper & Cpl. Erik Elliott), and Midland County (TX) Sheriff's Office (Dep. Alma Acosta & Dep. John Reese)
40	40	"05.13.17"	Cancelled due to Power Outage	N/A
This episode was scheduled to air on May 13, 2017, but was cancelled after a transformer blew at the Midtown, NY studios, which resulted in a power failure. A&E aired a rerun of Live PD that night, with a crawl message regarding the power failure.
41	41	"06.02.17"	June 2, 2017	1.594
Guest analyst: Sgt. Sean "Sticks" Larkin of the Tulsa (OK) Police Department Gang Unit; Departments and officers featured include: Arizona Department of Public Safety (Tpr. James Casey & Tpr. Todd Poole), Midland County (TX) Sheriff's Office, Richland County (SC) Sheriff's Department (Dep. Kevin Lawrence, S/D Chris Mastrianni, & Cpl. Gavin Walmsley) Calvert County (MD) Sheriff's Office (Cpl. Tony Moschetto & Dfc. Tim Mohler), Greenville County (SC) Sheriff's Office (Dep. Ryan Gibson, Dep. Alex Edwards, & Dep. Kyle Alexander), Jeffersonville (IN) Police Department (Sgt. Denver Leverett with K9 Flex & Ofc. Tom O'Neil), Utah Highway Patrol (Sgt. Mary Kaye Morris Lucas), Walton County (FL) Sheriff's Office (Sup. John Dalton), Mission (TX) Police Department (Ofc. Santiago Silva & Ofc. David Gonzalez) and Clark County (IN) Sheriff's Office (Ofc. Charles Scott)
42	42	"06.03.17"	June 3, 2017	1.442
Guest analyst: Sgt. Sean "Sticks" Larkin of the Tulsa (OK) Police Department Gang Unit; Departments and officers featured include: Arizona Department of Public Safety (Tpr. Steven Jacobs & Tpr. Todd Poole), Midland County (TX) Sheriff's Office (Dep. Andrew Shephard & Sheriff Gary Painter), Richland County (SC) Sheriff's Department (S/D David Farr, M/D Mark Laureano, & M/D John Hawkes) Calvert County (MD) Sheriff's Office (Dep. Nick Buckler & Dep. Joseph Ward), Greenville County (SC) Sheriff's Office (Dep. Ryan Gibson, Dep. Alex Edwards, Dep. Matt Broad & M/D Jonathan Parris), Jeffersonville (IN) Police Department (Sgt. Denver Leverett with K9 Flex), Mission (TX) Police Department (Ofc. Elias Munoz), Clark County (IN) Sheriff's Office (Lt. Mark Meyer), Utah Highway Patrol (Sgt. Steve Salas), and Warren County (KY) Sheriff's Office (Dep. Wes Jenkins)
43	43	"06.09.17"	June 9, 2017	1.322
Departments and officers featured include: Arizona Department of Public Safety (Tpr. Todd Poole & Tpr. Steven Jacobs), Midland County (TX) Sheriff's Office (Dep. John Reese & Dep. Bobby Neal), Richland County (SC) Sheriff's Department (S/D Chris Mastrianni & Cpl. James Abraham with K9 Denzel) Calvert County (MD) Sheriff's Office (Dfc. Tim Mohler), Greenville County (SC) Sheriff's Office (Dep. Kyle Alexander & Dep. Samuel Thompson), Jeffersonville (IN) Police Department (Ofc. Alyssa Wright with K9 Cairo & Ofc. Susan Woodard), Clark County (IN) Sheriff's Office (Ofc. AJ Vissing), Utah Highway Patrol (Sgt. David Moreno & Cpl. Cody McCoy)
44	44	"06.10.17"	June 10, 2017	1.392
Departments and officers featured include: Arizona Department of Public Safety (Tpr. Todd Poole & Tpr. Fred Harvey), Midland County (TX) Sheriff's Office (Dep. Cassandra Nunez, Cpl. Edward Reyes, & Dep. Robert Strahan), Richland County (SC) Sheriff's Department (Dep. Kevin Lawrence, Sgt. Steven Tapler, S/D Chris Mastrianni, & M/D Mark Laureano) Calvert County (MD) Sheriff's Office (Dfc. Steve Moran with K9 Kano & Dfc. Brian Pounsberry), Greenville County (SC) Sheriff's Office (Dep. Kyle Alexander, Dep. Sam Thompson, & Dep. Michael Giovanni), Jeffersonville (IN) Police Department (Ofc. Chris Campbell, Ofc. Alyssa Wright with K9 Cairo, & Ofc. Drew Lydon), Utah Highway Patrol (Sgt. David Moreno & Sgt. Rob Nixon)
45	45	"06.16.17"	June 16, 2017	1.595
Guest analyst: Sgt. Sean "Sticks" Larkin of the Tulsa (OK) Police Department Gang Unit; Departments and officers featured include: Arizona Department of Public Safety (Tpr. Todd Poole), Mission (TX) Police Department (Ofc. Juan Avila), Richland County (SC) Sheriff's Department (M/D Mark Laureano, Cpl. Gavin Walmsley, & Dep. Dave Kopenhaver) Calvert County (MD) Sheriff's Office (Dfc. Steve Moran), Greenville County (SC) Sheriff's Office (Dep. Matt Broad, M/D Jonathan Parris, Dep. Aaron Skinner), Jeffersonville (IN) Police Department (Ofc. Tom O'Neil, Sgt. Denver Leverett with K9 Flex, Ofc. Drew Lydon, & Ofc. Chris Campbell), Walton County (FL) Sheriff's Office (Sgt. Cory Webster) Midland County (TX) Sheriff's Office (Dep. Cassandra Nunez)
46	46	"06.17.17"	June 17, 2017	1.471
Guest analyst: Sgt. Sean "Sticks" Larkin of the Tulsa (OK) Police Department Gang Unit; Guest analyst: Sgt. Sean "Sticks" Larkin of the Tulsa (OK) Police Department Gang Unit; Departments and officers featured include: Arizona Department of Public Safety (Tpr. James Casey & Tpr. Steve Jacobs), Wakulla County (FL) Sheriff's Office (Dep. Matthew Hedges & Dep. Brandon Sheffield), Richland County (SC) Sheriff's Department (M/D Mark Laureano, Cpl. Gavin Walmsley with K9 Rico, & Sgt. Steven Tapler) Calvert County (MD) Sheriff's Office (Cpl. Tony Moschetto & Dep. Nick Buckler), Greenville County (SC) Sheriff's Office (Dep. Matt Broad & M/D Jonathan Parris), and Jeffersonville (IN) Police Department (Ofc. Kasey Cunningham, Ofc. Alyssa Wright with K9 Cairo, & Ofc. Susan Woodard)
47	47	"06.23.17"	June 23, 2017	1.636
Guest analyst: Sgt. Sean "Sticks" Larkin of the Tulsa (OK) Police Department Gang Unit; Departments and officers featured include: Arizona Department of Public Safety (Tpr. James Casey & Tpr. Todd Poole), Spokane County (WA) Sheriff's Office (Dep. John McQuitty & Dep. Veronica Van Patten), Richland County (SC) Sheriff's Department (Dep. Kevin Lawrence, Dep. Josh Newsom with K9 Bali, Lt. Curtis Wilson, & Lt. Danny Brown) Calvert County (MD) Sheriff's Office (Dfc. JD Denton, Dfc. Troy Holt, & Dfc. Tim Mohler), Greenville County (SC) Sheriff's Office (Dep. Samuel Thompson, Dep. Ryan Humburg, & Sgt. Ben Cannon), and Jeffersonville (IN) Police Department (Ofc. Tom O'Neil, Sgt. Denver Leverett with K9 Flex, & Ofc. Alyssa Wright)
48	48	"06.24.17"	June 24, 2017	1.578
Guest analyst: Sgt. Sean "Sticks" Larkin of the Tulsa (OK) Police Department Gang Unit; Departments and officers featured include: Arizona Department of Public Safety (Tpr. Steven Jacobs & Tpr. Todd Poole), Mission (TX) Police Department (Ofc. Juan Avila & Ofc. Elian Munoz), Richland County (SC) Sheriff's Department (Dep. Kevin Lawrence, S/D Chris Mastrianni, & M/D Mark Laureano) Wakulla County (FL) Sheriff's Office (Sgt. Scott Delbeato & Dep. Ashton Lesane), Greenville County (SC) Sheriff's Office (Dep. Samuel Thompson & Dep. Ryan Humburg), Jeffersonville (IN) Police Department (Ofc. Brandon McGhee & Ofc. Susan Woodard with K9 Blitz), and Calvert County (MD) Sheriff's Office (Dfc. Tim Mohler)
49	49	"07.07.17"	July 7, 2017	1.625
Guest analyst: Sgt. Sean "Sticks" Larkin of the Tulsa (OK) Police Department Gang Unit; Departments and officers featured include: Spokane County (WA) Sheriff's Office (Dep. Veronica Van Patten & Dep. John McQuitty), Mission (TX) Police Department (Ofc. Juan Avila & Ofc. John Oliva), Richland County (SC) Sheriff's Department (Dep. Kevin Lawrence, S/D Chris Mastrianni, Lt. Danny Brown, Dep. Dave Kopenhaver, & Dep. Robert Beary) Calvert County (MD) Sheriff's Office (Dfc. JD Denton, Dfc. Tim Mohler, Dfc. Tony Moschetto), Greenville County (SC) Sheriff's Office (Dep. Eric Mackey, Dep. Ryan Humburg, & Dep. Sam Thompson), Jeffersonville (IN) Police Department (Ofc. Tom O'Neil, Sgt. Denver Leverett with K9 Flex, & Ofc. Susan Woodard), and Arizona Department of Public Safety (Tpr. James Casey, Tpr. Todd Poole, & Tpr. Thomas La)
50	50	"07.08.17"	July 8, 2017	1.617
Guest analyst: Sgt. Sean "Sticks" Larkin of the Tulsa (OK) Police Department Gang Unit; Departments and officers featured include: Arizona Department of Public Safety (Tpr. Steve Jacobs & Tpr. Fred Harvey), Wakulla County (FL) Sheriff's Office (Dep. Matthew Hedges & Dep. Brandon Sheffield), Richland County (SC) Sheriff's Department (Dep. Kevin Lawrence, S/D Chris Mastrianni, S/D Katelyn Jasak, & M/D Mark Laureano), Spokane County (WA) Sheriff's Office (Dep. Travis West & Dep. Veronica Van Patten), Greenville County (SC) Sheriff's Office (Dep. Ryan Humburg, Dep. Eric Mackey, Dep. Kyle Alexander, & Dep. Sam Thompson), Jeffersonville (IN) Police Department (Ofc. Drew Lydon, Ofc. Chris Campbell, & Ofc. Ashley Humphreys), and Calvert County (MD) Sheriff's Office (Dep. Joe Ward)
51	51	"07.14.17"	July 14, 2017	1.663
Guest analysts: Dep. Kevin Lawrence and S/D Chris Mastrianni of the Richland County (SC) Sheriff's Department: Departments and officers featured include: Arizona Department of Public Safety (Tpr. James Casey & Tpr. Todd Poole), Spokane County (WA) Sheriff's Office (Dep. Veronica Van Patten & Dep. Nathan Booth), Richland County (SC) Sheriff's Department (Sgt. Steven Tapler & M/D Mark Laureano), Calvert County (MD) Sheriff's Office (Cpl. Tony Moschetto & Dfc. Brian Pounsberry), Greenville County (SC) Sheriff's Office (M/D Jonathan Parris, Dep. Alex Poag, & Dep. Kyle Alexander), Jeffersonville (IN) Police Department (Ofc. Alyssa Wright, Sgt. Denver Leverett with K9 Flex, & Ofc. Tom O'Neil), and Wakulla County (FL) Sheriff's Office (Dep. Gibby Gibson)
52	52	"07.15.17"	July 15, 2017	2.066
Guest analysts: Dep. Kevin Lawrence and S/D Chris Mastrianni of the Richland County (SC) Sheriff's Department: Departments and officers featured include: Arizona Department of Public Safety (Tpr. James Casey & Tpr. Todd Poole), Lake County (IL) Sheriff's Office (Dep. Rebecca Loeb & Dep. John Hird), Richland County (SC) Sheriff's Department (M/D Mark Laureano & Dep. Robert Beary), Wakulla County (FL) Sheriff's Office (Dep. Matthew Hedges, Dep. Brandon Sheffield, & Dep. Gibby Gibson), Greenville County (SC) Sheriff's Office (Dep. Matt Broad & M/D Jonathan Parris), Jeffersonville (IN) Police Department (Ofc. Chris Campbell, Ofc. Susan Woodard with K9 Blitz, Ofc. Kasey Cunningham, & Ofc. Drew Lydon), Calvert County (MD) Sheriff's Office (Dfc. Tim Mohler), and Spokane County (WA) Sheriff's Office (Dep. Nathan Booth)
53	53	"07.21.17"	July 21, 2017	1.857
Guest analyst: Sgt. Sean "Sticks" Larkin of the Tulsa (OK) Police Department Gang Unit; Departments and officers featured include: Arizona Department of Public Safety (Tpr. James Casey & Tpr. Todd Poole), Spokane County (WA) Sheriff's Office (Dep. Veronica Van Patten, Dep. John McQuitty, Dep. Travis West, Dep. Tyler Kullman), Richland County (SC) Sheriff's Department (Sgt. Steven Tapler & Dep. Robert Beary), Calvert County (MD) Sheriff's Office (Dfc. Steve Moran & Cpl. Tony Moschetto), Greenville County (SC) Sheriff's Office (Dep. Ivan Rodriguez, Dep. Madeline Hester, & Dep. Kyle Alexander), Jeffersonville (IN) Police Department (Ofc. Chris Campbell, Sgt. Denver Leverett with K9 Flex, & Ofc. Tom O'Neil), and Wakulla County (FL) Sheriff's Office (Sgt. Scott Delbeato)
54	54	"07.22.17"	July 22, 2017	1.757
Guest analyst: Sgt. Sean "Sticks" Larkin of the Tulsa (OK) Police Department Gang Unit; Departments and officers featured include: Arizona Department of Public Safety (Tpr. Steve Jacobs & Tpr. Todd Poole), Spokane County (WA) Sheriff's Office (Dep. Sam Turner & Dep. John McQuitty), Richland County (SC) Sheriff's Department (Sgt. Steven Tapler, Dep. Robert Beary, Cpl. David Fairbanks, & Dep. Kevin Lawrence), Lake County (IL) Sheriff's Office (Det. Eric Carstensen, Det. Michael Nudi, & Dep. Rebecca Loeb), Greenville County (SC) Sheriff's Office (Dep. Ryan Gibson & Dep. Alex Edwards), Jeffersonville (IN) Police Department (Ofc. Tom O'Neil & Ofc Alyssa Wright with K9 Cairo), and Mission (TX) Police Department (Ofc. John Oliva)
55	55	"07.28.17"	July 28, 2017	1.759
Guest analyst: Sgt. Steven Tapler of the Richland County (SC) Sheriff's Department; Departments and officers featured include: Arizona Department of Public Safety (Tpr. James Casey & Tpr. Todd Poole), Spokane County (WA) Sheriff's Office (Dep. John McQuitty, Dep. Michael Keys, & Dep. Sam Turner), Richland County (SC) Sheriff's Department (Lt. Danny Brown, Dep. Josh Newsom with K9 Bali, & Cpl. David Fairbanks), Lake County (IL) Sheriff's Office (Det. Eric Carstensen, Det. Michael Nudi, & Dep. Rebecca Loeb), Greenville County (SC) Sheriff's Office (Dep. Ryan Gibson & Dep. Alex Edwards), Jeffersonville (IN) Police Department (Ofc. Tom O'Neil & Ofc. Alyssa Wright with K9 Cairo), and Wakulla County (FL) Sheriff's Office (Dep. Andrea Sessor)
56	56	"07.29.17"	July 29, 2017	2.017
Guest analyst: Sgt. Steven Tapler of the Richland County (SC) Sheriff's Department; Departments and officers featured include: Arizona Department of Public Safety (Tpr. Steve Jacobs & Tpr. James Casey), Spokane County (WA) Sheriff's Office (Dep. John McQuitty, Dep. Jason Hunt with K9 Gunner, & Dep. Michael Keys), Richland County (SC) Sheriff's Department (Lt. Danny Brown, Dep. Josh Newsom with K9 Bali, & S/D Katelyn Jasak), Calvert County (MD) Sheriff's Office (Cpl. Tony Moschetto & Dfc. Tim Mohler), Greenville County (SC) Sheriff's Office (Dep. Ryan Gibson & Dep. Alex Edwards), Jeffersonville (IN) Police Department (Ofc. Chris Campbell & Ofc. Alyssa Wright with K9 Cairo), Lake County (IL) Sheriff's Office (Dep. John Hird), and Wakulla County (FL) Sheriff's Office (Dep. Matthew Hedges & Dep. Brandon Sheffield)
57	57	"08.04.17"	August 4, 2017	1.893
Guest analyst: Dfc. Tim Mohler of the Calvert County (MD) Sheriff's Office; Departments and officers featured include: Arizona Department of Public Safety (Tpr. James Casey & Tpr. Todd Poole), Spokane County (WA) Sheriff's Office (Dep. John McQuitty, Dep. Jason Hunt with K9 Gunner, Dep. Veronica Van Patten, & Dep. Travis West), Richland County (SC) Sheriff's Department (Dep. Kevin Lawrence, S/D Chris Mastrianni, & Dep. Dave Kopenhaver), Calvert County (MD) Sheriff's Office (Dfc. Steve Moran with K9 Kano, Cpl. Tony Moschetto, Dfc. Yuri Bortchevsky, & Dep. Joe Ward), Greenville County (SC) Sheriff's Office (Dep. Kyle Alexander & Dep. Ivan Rodriguez), Jeffersonville (IN) Police Department (Ofc. Brandon McGhee & Ofc. Alyssa Wright with K9 Cairo), Wakulla County (FL) Sheriff's Office (Dep. Matthew Hedges & Dep. Brandon Sheffield), and Lake County (IL) Sheriff's Office (Dep. Timothy Fish)
58	58	"08.05.17"	August 5, 2017	1.932
Guest analyst: Dfc. Tim Mohler of the Calvert County (MD) Sheriff's Office; Departments and officers featured include: Arizona Department of Public Safety (Tpr. Steve Jacobs & Tpr. Todd Poole), Spokane County (WA) Sheriff's Office (Dep. Travis West, Dep. Jason Hunt with K9 Gunner, Dep. Randy Watts, & Dep. Veronica Van Patten), Richland County (SC) Sheriff's Department (Lt. Danny Brown & Dep. Robert Beary), Calvert County (MD) Sheriff's Office (Dfc. JD Denton, Dfc. Steve Moran with K9 Kano, Dep. Joe Ward & Cpl. Richard Wilson), Lake County (IL) Sheriff's Office (Dep. Rebecca Loeb, Dep. Al Frank, & Dep. Stephen Semasko ), and Jeffersonville (IN) Police Department (Ofc. Brandon McGhee & Ofc. Alyssa Wright with K9 Cairo)
59	59	"08.11.17"	August 11, 2017	2.042
Guest analyst: Ofc. Alyssa Wright of the Jeffersonville (IN) Police Department; Departments and officers featured include: Arizona Department of Public Safety (Tpr. James Casey, Tpr. Todd Poole, & Tpr. Steven Jacobs), Spokane County (WA) Sheriff's Office (Dep. Nathan Booth, Dep. Amber Tyler, & Dep. Veronica Van Patten), Richland County (SC) Sheriff's Department (Lt. Danny Brown, Sgt. Steven Tapler, & Dep. Josh Newsom with K9 Bali), Lake County (IL) Sheriff's Office (Det. Eric Carstensen, Det. Patricia List, Det. Matt Harmon, & Dep. John Hird), Greenville County (SC) Sheriff's Office (Dep. Ryan Gibson, Dep. Alex Edwards, Dep. Kyle Alexander, & Dep. Aaron Skinner), Jeffersonville (IN) Police Department (Ofc. Brandon McGhee & Ofc. Susan Woodard with K9 Blitz), and Calvert County (MD) Sheriff's Office (Cpl. Richard Wilson)
60	60	"08.12.17"	August 12, 2017	2.005
Guest analyst: Ofc. Alyssa Wright of the Jeffersonville (IN) Police Department; Departments and officers featured include: Arizona Department of Public Safety (Tpr. Steven Jacobs & Tpr. James Casey), Spokane County (WA) Sheriff's Office (Dep. Nathan Booth, Dep. Jason Hunt with K9 Gunner, & Dep. Thomas Wakem), Richland County (SC) Sheriff's Department (M/D Mark Laureano & Dep. Robert Beary), Wakulla County (FL) Sheriff's Office (Dep. Gibby Gibson, Sgt. Scott Delbeato, Dep. Matthew Hedges & Dep. Brandon Sheffield), Greenville County (SC) Sheriff's Office (Dep. Ryan Gibson, Dep. Alex Edwards, Dep. Aaron Skinner, & Dep. Kyle Alexander), Jeffersonville (IN) Police Department (Ofc. Brandon McGhee & Ofc. Chris Campbell), and Calvert County (MD) Sheriff's Office (Dfc. Steve Moran)
61	61	"08.18.17"	August 18, 2017	1.948
Guest analyst: Sgt. Sean "Sticks" Larkin of the Tulsa (OK) Police Department Gang Unit; Departments and officers featured include: Arizona Department of Public Safety (Tpr. James Casey, Tpr. Todd Poole, & Tpr. Steven Jacobs), Spokane County (WA) Sheriff's Office (Dep. John McQuitty, Dep. Jason Hunt with K9 Gunner, & Dep. Michael Keys), Richland County (SC) Sheriff's Department (Dep. Kevin Lawrence, S/D Chris Mastrianni, & Lt. Danny Brown), Lake County (IL) Sheriff's Office (Det. Eric Carstensen, Det. Matt Harmon, & Dep. Chris DeWitt), Greenville County (SC) Sheriff's Office (M/D Ivan Rodriguez, Dep. Bre Kowaleski, & Dep. Ryan Humburg), Jeffersonville (IN) Police Department (Ofc. Tom O'Neil & Sgt. Denver Leverett with K9 Flex), and Calvert County (MD) Sheriff's Office (Dfc. Steve Moran)
62	62	"08.19.17"	August 19, 2017	1.899
Guest analyst: Sgt. Sean "Sticks" Larkin of the Tulsa (OK) Police Department Gang Unit; Departments and officers featured include: Arizona Department of Public Safety (Tpr. James Casey, Tpr. Todd Poole, & Tpr. Hugh Grant), Spokane County (WA) Sheriff's Office (Dep. Veronica Van Patten & Dep. Nathan Booth), Richland County (SC) Sheriff's Department (Dep. Kevin Lawrence & S/D Chris Mastrianni), Wakulla County (FL) Sheriff's Office (Dep. Matthew Hedges, Dep. Brandon Sheffield, Sgt. Scott Delbeato, Dep. Kenneth Miller, & Dep. Gibby Gibson), Greenville County (SC) Sheriff's Office (M/D Ivan Rodriguez, Dep. Bre Kowaleski, & Dep. Ryan Gibson), Jeffersonville (IN) Police Department (Ofc. Kasey Cunningham & Ofc. Susan Woodard with K9 Blitz), Calvert County (MD) Sheriff's Office (Dfc. Yuri Bortchevsky), Lake County (IL) Sheriff's Office (Det. Matt Harmon & Det. Eric Kaechele)
