= CCSO =

CCSO may refer to:

- Cape Cod Symphony Orchestra, the Cape Symphony orchestra
- CCSO Nameserver, Computing and Communications Services Office Ph Nameserver, an early form of database search on the Internet
- One of several law enforcement agencies in the United States
  - Calvert County Sheriff's Office
  - Charles County Sheriff's Office
  - Citrus County Sheriff's Office
  - Cook County Sheriff's Office
