= Live PD season 2 =

Live PD
- Season 2
- Starring: Dan Abrams; Tom Morris Jr.
- No. of episodes: 81

Release
- Original network: A&E
- Original release: October 6, 2017 – August 25, 2018

Season chronology
- ← Previous; Season 1 Next → Season 3

The second season of the television series Live PD began airing October 6, 2017, on A&E in the United States. The season concluded on August 25, 2018 and contained 81 episodes.

== Departments ==
Departments returning from season one

- Richland County (SC) Sheriff's Department
- Utah Highway Patrol/Utah State Bureau of Investigation
- Clark County (IN) Sheriff's Office
- Jeffersonville (IN) Police Department
- Greenville County (SC) Sheriff's Office (taped segments only)
- Spokane County (WA) Sheriff's Office
- Lake County (IL) Sheriff's Office
- Mission (TX) Police Department (Returned S02E75 "08.10.18")

Departments debuting in season two

- El Paso (TX) Police Department
- Pasco County (FL) Sheriff's Office
- Streetsboro (OH) Police Department
- Pinal County (AZ) Sheriff's Office
- Slidell (LA) Police Department
- Nye County (NV) Sheriff's Office
- Fort Bend County (TX) Sheriff's Office
- Greene County (MO) Sheriff's Office
- Gwinnett County (GA) Sheriff's Office
- Warwick (RI) Police Department

italics indicates a department that returned for season three

== Episodes ==
No. overall	No. in season	Title	Original release date	U.S. viewers (millions)
63	1	"10.06.17"	October 6, 2017	1.764
Guest analyst: Sgt. Sean "Sticks" Larkin of the Tulsa (OK) Police Department Gang Unit; Departments and officers featured include: El Paso Police Department (Ofc. Maria Gonzalez & Ofc. Jake Kiesel), Pasco County (FL) Sheriff's Office (Cpl. Steven Walker & Dep. Courtland Harrison), Richland County (SC) Sheriff's Department (Lt. Danny Brown & Dep. Robert Beary), Lake County (IL) Sheriff's Office (Dep. Rebecca Loeb, Det. Matt Harmon, & Dep. Tyler Girmscheid), Utah Highway Patrol (Sgt. Mary Kaye Lucas & Sgt. David Moreno), Jeffersonville (IN) Police Department (Ofc. Tom O'Neil & Sgt. Denver Leverett with K9 Flex), and Greenville County (SC) Sheriff's Office (M/D Ivan Rodriguez)
64	2	"10.07.17"	October 7, 2017	1.637
Guest analyst: Sgt. Sean "Sticks" Larkin of the Tulsa (OK) Police Department Gang Unit; Departments and officers featured include: Pinal County (AZ) Sheriff's Office (Dep. Jackson Deenert & Dep. Ivan Iniguez), Pasco County (FL) Sheriff's Office (Cpl. Steven Walker & Dep. Courtland Harrison), Richland County (SC) Sheriff's Department (Dep. Kevin Lawrence & S/D Garo Brown), Streetsboro (OH) Police Department (Ofc. Art Milner & Ofc. Chris Petro), Utah Highway Patrol (Sgt. David Moreno & Sgt. Zach Randall), Jeffersonville (IN) Police Department (Ofc. Brandon McGhee, Ofc. Chris Campbell, Sgt. Denver Leverett with K9 Flex & Ofc. Alyssa Wright), Lake County (IL) Sheriff's Office (Dep. Rebecca Loeb & Dep. Chris DeWitt), and Greenville County (SC) Sheriff's Office (Dep. Alex Edwards)
65	3	"10.13.17"	October 13, 2017	1.619
Guest analyst: Sgt. Sean "Sticks" Larkin of the Tulsa (OK) Police Department Gang Unit; Departments and officers featured include: El Paso (TX) Police Department (Ofc. Jake Kiesel & Ofc. Maria Gonzalez), Pasco County (FL) Sheriff's Office (Cpl. Enriques Baca, Dep. Sean Logan & Dep. Ashley Frame), Richland County (SC) Sheriff's Department (Lt. Danny Brown & Dep. Addy Perez), Lake County (IL) Sheriff's Office (Dep. Rebecca Loeb & Dep. Steve Campobasso), Pinal County (AZ) Sheriff's Office (Dep. Travis Williams with K9 Troy), and Jeffersonville (IN) Police Department (Ofc. Tom O'Neil & Sgt. Denver Leverett with K9 Flex)
66	4	"10.14.17"	October 14, 2017	1.817
Guest analyst: Sgt. Sean "Sticks" Larkin of the Tulsa (OK) Police Department Gang Unit; Departments and officers featured include: El Paso (TX) Police Department (Ofc. Maria Gonzalez, Ofc. Jake Kiesel, Ofc. Kevin McKinney, Ofc. Russ Wells, & Ofc. Chris Gates), Pasco County (FL) Sheriff's Office (Cpl. Enriques Baca & Dep. Sean Logan), Richland County (SC) Sheriff's Department (Sgt. Steven Tapler, S/D Garo Brown, & Dep. Dave Kopenhaver), Streetsboro (OH) Police Department (Ofc. Tom Ondecker & Ofc. Daniel Mulcahy), Utah Highway Patrol (Sgt. Zach Randall & Tpr. Kade Loveland with K9 Drago), and Jeffersonville (IN) Police Department (Ofc. Drew Lydon, Ofc. Susan Woodard, Ofc. Brandon McGhee, Cpl. Rick Ashabranner, Sgt. Denver Leverett with K9 Flex, & Ofc. Tom O'Neil)
67	5	"10.20.17"	October 20, 2017	1.614
Guest analyst: Sgt. Sean "Sticks" Larkin of the Tulsa (OK) Police Department Gang Unit; Departments and officers featured include: El Paso (TX) Police Department (Ofc. Kevin McKinney, Ofc. Jake Kiesel, Ofc. Jesus Melendez with K9 Johnny Cash, Ofc. Maria Gonzalez), Pasco County (FL) Sheriff's Office (Dep. Courtland Harrison & Dep. Mark Pini with K9 Yogi), Richland County (SC) Sheriff's Department (Lt. Danny Brown, Cpl. James Abraham with K9 Denzel, M/D David Slemp), Streetsboro (OH) Police Department (Ofc. Art Milner, Ofc. Chris Petro & Ofc. Daniel Mulcahy), Utah Highway Patrol (Sgt. Mary Kaye Lucas, Sgt. Donavan Lucas, & Sgt. Zach Randall), and Jeffersonville (IN) Police Department (Ofc. Tom O'Neil, Sgt. Denver Leverett with K9 Flex, & Ofc. Susan Woodard with K9 Blitz)
68	6	"10.21.17"	October 21, 2017	1.601
Guest analyst: Sgt. Sean "Sticks" Larkin of the Tulsa (OK) Police Department Gang Unit; Departments and officers featured include: El Paso (TX) Police Department (Ofc. Kevin McKinney, Ofc. Jake Kiesel, Ofc. Maria Gonzalez), Pasco County (FL) Sheriff's Office (Dep. Joseph Mercado, Cpl. Matt Stritt, & Dep. Courtland Harrison), Richland County (SC) Sheriff's Department (S/D Garo Brown, Dep. Josh Newsom with K9 Bali, M/D Chris Blanding), Lake County (IL) Sheriff's Office (Det. Matt Harmon, Det. Lana LeMons, Dep. Robert Rossetti), Pinal County (AZ) Sheriff's Office (Dep. Ivan Iniguez & Dep. Travis Williams with K9 Troy), and Jeffersonville (IN) Police Department (Ofc. Andrew Wassel, Ofc. Susan Woodard with K9 Blitz, & Ofc. Aaron Olson)
69	7	"10.27.17"	October 27, 2017	1.657
Guest analyst: Deputy Kevin Lawrence of the Richland County (SC) Sheriff's Department; Departments and officers featured include: El Paso (TX) Police Department (Ofc. Kevin McKinney, Ofc. Jake Kiesel, & Ofc. Jesus Melendez with K9 Johnny Cash), Pasco County (FL) Sheriff's Office (Dep. Ashley Frame & Dep. Ryan Lennox with K9 Jango), Richland County (SC) Sheriff's Department (Sgt. Steven Tapler & Dep. DonnyRay Campbell), Lake County (IL) Sheriff's Office (Det. Lana LeMons, Dep. John Willer, & Dep. John Hird), Pinal County (AZ) Sheriff's Office (Dep. Jesus Soto, Dep. Ken Nardelli with K9 Niko & Dep. Travis Williams with K9 Troy), and Jeffersonville (IN) Police Department (Ofc. Tom O'Neil & Sgt. Denver Leverett with K9 Flex)
70	8	"10.28.17"	October 28, 2017	1.513
Guest analyst: Deputy Kevin Lawrence of the Richland County (SC) Sheriff's Department; Departments and officers featured include: El Paso (TX) Police Department (Ofc. Kevin McKinney, Ofc. Jake Kiesel, & Ofc. Maria Gonzalez), Richland County (SC) Sheriff's Department (Dep. DonnyRay Campbell), Pinal County (AZ) Sheriff's Office (Dep. Jesus Soto, Dep. Ken Nardelli with K9 Niko & Dep. Travis Williams with K9 Troy), Jeffersonville (IN) Police Department (Ofc. Tom O'Neil & Sgt. Denver Leverett with K9 Flex), Pasco County (FL) Sheriff's Office (Dep. Joseph Mercado & Dep. John Riyad), and Lake County (IL) Sheriff's Office (Dep. Kyle McManaway)
71	9	"11.03.17"	November 3, 2017	1.716
Guest analyst: Sgt. Sean "Sticks" Larkin of the Tulsa (OK) Police Department Gang Unit; Departments and officers featured include: El Paso (TX) Police Department (Ofc. Kevin McKinney & Ofc. Jake Kiesel), Pasco County (FL) Sheriff's Office (Cpl. Matt Stritt, Dep. Mark Pini with K9 Yogi, & Sgt. Chris Thomas), Richland County (SC) Sheriff's Department (Dep. Kevin Lawrence, S/D Garo Brown, S/D Kelly Smith, & Dep. DonnyRay Campbell), Streetsboro (OH) Police Department (Ofc. Art Milner, Ofc. Chris Petro, & Ofc. Aaron Coates with K9 Bo), Lake County (IL) Sheriff's Office (Dep. John Hird, Dep. Steve Campobasso, & Det. Eric Carstensen), and Clark County (IN) Sheriff's Office (Sgt. Erik Elliott & Ofc. Mark Grube)
72	10	"11.04.17"	November 4, 2017	2.071
Guest analyst: Sgt. Sean "Sticks" Larkin of the Tulsa (OK) Police Department Gang Unit; Departments and officers featured include: El Paso (TX) Police Department (Ofc. Kevin McKinney & Ofc. Jake Kiesel), Pasco County (FL) Sheriff's Office (Cpl. Matt Stritt, Dep. Joseph Mercado, & Dep. James McCabe), Richland County (SC) Sheriff's Department (Lt. Danny Brown & M/D Chris Blanding), Streetsboro (OH) Police Department (Ofc. Chris Petro, Ofc. Gene Larson, & Ofc. Daniel Mulcahy), Pinal County (AZ) Sheriff's Office (Dep. Danny Tabor & Dep. Ivan Iniguez), and Jeffersonville (IN) Police Department (Sgt. Erik Elliott & Ofc. Mark Grube)
73	11	"11.10.17"	November 10, 2017	1.720
Guest analyst: Sgt. Denver Leverett of the Jeffersonville (IN) Police Department with K9 Flex; Departments and officers featured include: El Paso (TX) Police Department (Ofc. Maria Gonzalez, Ofc. Diego Solis, & Ofc. Jake Kiesel), Pasco County (FL) Sheriff's Office (Dep. Ashley Frame, Dep. Ryan Lennox with K9 Jango, & Dep. Courtland Harrison), Richland County (SC) Sheriff's Department (Dep. Kevin Lawrence, S/D Chris Mastrianni, Lt. Danny Brown, & M/D David Slemp), Pinal County (AZ) Sheriff's Office (Dep. Jeff McElwain & Dep. Jesus Soto), Spokane County (WA) Sheriff's Office (Dep. Brandon Wilson & Dep. Joel Gorham), Lake County (IL) Sheriff's Office, (Det. Lana LeMons & Dep. Steve Campobasso), Streetsboro (OH) Police Department (Ofc. Thomas Ondecker & Sgt. Justin Leidel), and Jeffersonville (IN) Police Department (Ofc. Brandon McGhee)
74	12	"11.11.17"	November 11, 2017	2.050
Guest analyst: Sgt. Denver Leverett of the Jeffersonville (IN) Police Department with K9 Flex; Departments and officers featured include: El Paso (TX) Police Department (Ofc. Efrain Carrillo & Ofc. Jesus Melendez with K9 Johnny Cash), Pasco County (FL) Sheriff's Office (Dep. Ashley Frame & Dep. Ryan Lennox with K9 Jango), Richland County (SC) Sheriff's Department (M/D Mark Laureano & Dep. Kelly Smith), Utah Highway Patrol (Sgt. Zach Randall, Tpr. Kade Loveland with K9 Drago, & Sgt. David Moreno), Spokane County (WA) Sheriff's Office (Dep. Jason Hunt & Dep. Joel Gorham), Clark County (IN) Sheriff's Office, (Sgt. Erik Elliot & Capt. Mark Meyer), Streetsboro (OH) Police Department (Ofc. Gene Larson), and Jeffersonville (IN) Police Department (Ofc. Tom O'Neil)
75	13	"11.17.17"	November 17, 2017	1.812
Guest analyst: Sgt. Sean "Sticks" Larkin of the Tulsa (OK) Police Department Gang Unit; Departments and officers featured include: El Paso (TX) Police Department (Ofc. Maria Gonzalez, Ofc. Kevin McKinney, & Ofc. Jake Kiesel), Pasco County (FL) Sheriff's Office (Cpl. Matt Stritt, Dep. Mark Pini with K9 Yogi, & Dep. Joseph Mercado), Richland County (SC) Sheriff's Department (Lt. Danny Brown, Sgt. Steven Tapler, M/D David Slemp & Dep. Addy Perez), Lake County (IL) Sheriff's Office (Det. Matt Harmon & Det. Mike Nudi), Spokane County (WA) Sheriff's Office (Dep. Brandon Wilson & Dep. Byron Zlateff), Utah Highway Patrol (Sgt. David Moreno, Sgt. Cody McCoy, & Tpr. Kade Loveland with K9 Drago), and Streetsboro (OH) Police Department (Ofc. Daniel Mulcahy),
76	14	"11.18.17"	November 18, 2017	1.886
Guest analyst: Sgt. Sean "Sticks" Larkin of the Tulsa (OK) Police Department Gang Unit; Departments and officers featured include: El Paso (TX) Police Department (Ofc. Kevin McKinney, Ofc. Maria Gonzalez, & Ofc. Jake Kiesel), Pasco County (FL) Sheriff's Office (Cpl. Matt Stritt & Dep. Mark Pini with K9 Yogi), Richland County (SC) Sheriff's Department (S/D Garo Brown & Dep. Addy Perez), Pinal County (AZ) Sheriff's Office (Dep. Jeff McElwain & Dep. Ivan Iniguez), Spokane County (WA) Sheriff's Office (Dep. Brandon Wilson & Dep. Byron Zlateff), Clark County (IN) Sheriff's Office (Sgt. Erik Elliot & Ofc. Wes Harper), and Lake County (IL) Sheriff's Office (Det. Lana LeMons)
77	15	"11.24.17"	November 24, 2017	1.908
Guest analyst: Sgt. Sean "Sticks" Larkin of the Tulsa (OK) Police Department Gang Unit; Departments and officers featured include: El Paso (TX) Police Department (Ofc. Efrain Carrillo, Ofc. Heather Ponce, Ofc. Carlos Hacinda, Ofc. Cory Garda, & Ofc. Jesus Melendez with K9 Johnny Cash), Pasco County (FL) Sheriff's Office (Dep. Ashley Frame, Dep. Ryan Lennox with K9 Jango, & Dep. Stephen Gibson), Richland County (SC) Sheriff's Department (Dep. Kevin Lawrence, Sgt. Steven Tapler, & Lt. Danny Brown), Lake County (IL) Sheriff's Office (Det. Matt Harmon & Det. Michael Nudi), Spokane County (WA) Sheriff's Office (Dep. Brandon Wilson & Dep. Joel Gorham), Clark County (IN) Sheriff's Office (Capt. Mark Meyer & Ofc. Charles Scott), and Pinal County (AZ) Sheriff's Office (Dep. Ivan Iniguez)
78	16	"11.25.17"	November 25, 2017	1.802
Guest analyst: Sgt. Sean "Sticks" Larkin of the Tulsa (OK) Police Department Gang Unit; Departments and officers featured include: El Paso (TX) Police Department (Ofc. Efrain Carrillo & Ofc. Andrea Zendejas), Pasco County (FL) Sheriff's Office (Dep. Ashley Frame & Dep. Ryan Lennox with K9 Jango), Richland County (SC) Sheriff's Department (Cpl. Mark Laureano & Dep. DonnyRay Campbell), Utah Highway Patrol (Sgt. David Moreno, Sgt. Cody McCoy, & Tpr. Kade Loveland), Spokane County (WA) Sheriff's Office (Dep. Brandon Wilson & Dep. Clay Hilton with K9 Bane), Pinal County (AZ) Sheriff's Office (Dep. Chris Nardelli & Dep. Ken Nardelli with K9 Niko), and Lake County (IL) Sheriff's Office (Dep. Kyle McManaway)
79	17	"12.01.17"	December 1, 2017	1.720
Guest analyst: Sgt. Sean "Sticks" Larkin of the Tulsa (OK) Police Department Gang Unit; Departments and officers featured include: El Paso (TX) Police Department (Ofc. Kevin McKinney, Ofc. Jake Kiesel, Ofc. Efrain Carrillo, Ofc. Mathew Knight, Ofc. Cory Garda & Ofc. Julian Peña), Pasco County (FL) Sheriff's Office (Dep. Chris Ramos, Dep. Nick Carmack with K9 Shep, Dep. Ryan Lennox, Dep. Sabrina Mathews, & Cpl. Paul Reagan), Richland County (SC) Sheriff's Department (Dep. Kevin Lawrence & S/D Chris Mastrianni), Lake County (IL) Sheriff's Office (Dep. Rebecca Loeb, Det. Matt Harmon, & Dep. Kyle McManaway), Spokane County (WA) Sheriff's Office (Dep. Byron Zlateff & Dep. Joel Gorham), Clark County (IN) Sheriff's Office (Sgt. Erik Elliott & Ofc. Wes Harper), Jeffersonville (IN) Police Department (Ofc. Tom O'Neil & Sgt. Denver Leverett with K9 Flex), and Utah Highway Patrol (Sgt. Nick Street)
80	18	"12.02.17"	December 2, 2017	1.759
Guest analyst: Sgt. Sean "Sticks" Larkin of the Tulsa (OK) Police Department Gang Unit; Departments and officers featured include: El Paso (TX) Police Department (Ofc. Jake Kiesel, Ofc. Kevin McKinney, & Ofc. Heather Ponce), Pasco County (FL) Sheriff's Office (Dep. Chris Ramos, Dep. Mark Pini with K9 Yogi, Cpl. Steven Walker, Dep. Sabrina Mathews, & Dep. Joe Coxon), Richland County (SC) Sheriff's Department (Lt. Danny Brown & Dep. Kelly Smith), Pinal County (AZ) Sheriff's Office (Dep. Jeff McElwain & Dep. Chris Nardelli), Spokane County (WA) Sheriff's Office (Dep. Byron Zlateff & Dep. Joel Gorham), Jeffersonville (IN) Police Department (Ofc. Aaron Olson & Sgt. Denver Leverett with K9 Flex), and Utah Highway Patrol (Tpr. Kade Loveland with K9 Drago & Tpr. Mike Terry)
81	19	"12.08.17"	December 8, 2017	1.711
Guest analyst: Sgt. Sean "Sticks" Larkin of the Tulsa (OK) Police Department Gang Unit; Departments and officers featured include: El Paso (TX) Police Department (Ofc. Jake Kiesel, Ofc. Maria Gonzalez, & Efrain Carrillo), Pasco County (FL) Sheriff's Office (Dep. Sabrina Mathews & Dep. Mike Sentner with K9 Yager), Richland County (SC) Sheriff's Department (Dep. Kevin Lawrence & S/D Chris Mastrianni), Lake County (IL) Sheriff's Office (Dep. Rebecca Loeb & Det. Matt Harmon), Spokane County (WA) Sheriff's Office (Dep. Brandon Wilson, Dep. Byron Zlateff, & Dep. Joel Gorham), Jeffersonville (IN) Police Department (Ofc. Tom O'Neil & Sgt. Denver Leverett with K9 Flex), Clark County (IN) Sheriff's Office (Ofc. Wes Harper), and Utah Highway Patrol (Sgt. Zach Randall)
82	20	"12.09.17"	December 9, 2017	2.040
Guest analyst: Sgt. Sean "Sticks" Larkin of the Tulsa (OK) Police Department Gang Unit; Departments and officers featured include: El Paso (TX) Police Department (Ofc. Efrain Carrillo & Ofc. Andrea Zendejas), Pasco County (FL) Sheriff's Office (Dep. Sabrina Mathews & Dep. Mike Sentner with K9 Yager), Richland County (SC) Sheriff's Department (Cpl. Mark Laureano & Dep. Addy Perez), Pinal County (AZ) Sheriff's Office (Dep. Jeff McElwain, Dep. Jesus Soto, & Dep. Ivan Iniguez), Spokane County (WA) Sheriff's Office (Dep. Brandon Wilson, Dep. Joel Gorham, Dep. Tyler Kullman with K9 Khan, Dep. Jason Hunt with K9 Gunner), Jeffersonville (IN) Police Department (Ofc. Tom O'Neil & Sgt. Denver Leverett with K9 Flex), and Utah Highway Patrol (Sgt. David Moreno, Sgt. Cody McCoy, & Sgt. Donavan Lucas)
83	21	"12.15.17"	December 15, 2017	1.777
Guest analyst: Dep. Rebecca Loeb of the Lake County (IL) Sheriff's Office; Departments and officers featured include: El Paso (TX) Police Department (Ofc. Andrea Zendejas & Ofc. Oscar Gabaldon), Pasco County (FL) Sheriff's Office (Dep. Chris Ramos & Dep. Nick Carmack with K9 Shep), Richland County (SC) Sheriff's Department (Sgt. Steven Tapler, S/D Garo Brown, & Lt. Danny Brown), Utah Highway Patrol (Sgt. Cody McCoy & Sgt. Randy Riches), Spokane County (WA) Sheriff's Office (Dep. Brandon Wilson, Dep. Jason Hunt with K9 Gunnar, & Sgt. Damon Simmons), Lake County (IL) Sheriff's Office (Det. Eric Carstensen, Dep. Dwight Arrowood with K9 Duke, Dep. Robert Rossetti, & Dep. Vince Sciarrone), Clark County (IN) Sheriff's Office (Sgt. Erik Elliott), Jeffersonville (IN) Police Department (Ofc. Kasey Cunningham & Cpl. Rick Ashabranner), and Pinal County (AZ) Sheriff's Office (Dep. Jeff McElwain)
84	22	"12.16.17"	December 16, 2017	1.911
Guest analyst: Dep. Rebecca Loeb of the Lake County (IL) Sheriff's Office; Departments and officers featured include: El Paso (TX) Police Department (Ofc. Heather Ponce, Ofc. Andrea Zendejas & Ofc. Jesus Melendez with K9 Johnny Cash), Pasco County (FL) Sheriff's Office (Dep. Chris Ramos & Dep. Nick Carmack with K9 Shep), Richland County (SC) Sheriff's Department (Lt. Danny Brown, Dep. Addy Perez, & Cpl. Mark Laureano), Pinal County (AZ) Sheriff's Office (Dep. Jeff McElwain, Dep. Ivan Iniguez, & Dep. Jesus Soto), Spokane County (WA) Sheriff's Office (Dep. Brandon Wilson & Dep. Jason Hunt with K9 Gunnar), Jeffersonville (IN) Police Department (Ofc. Cody Richardson & Ofc. Levi James), Clark County (IN) Sheriff's Office (Sgt. Erik Elliott), and Utah Highway Patrol (Sgt. Cody McCoy)
85	23	"01.05.18"	January 5, 2018	2.078
Guest analyst: Sgt. Sean "Sticks" Larkin of the Tulsa (OK) Police Department Gang Unit; Departments and officers featured include: Slidell (LA) Police Department (Ofc. Bryant Estes & Ofc. Justin Stokes with K9 Scout), Pasco County (FL) Sheriff's Office (Dep. Courtland Harrison, Dep. Ashley Frame, Dep. Sabrina Mathews, & Cpl. Adam Gonzalez), Richland County (SC) Sheriff's Department (Lt. Danny Brown & S/D Garo Brown), Utah Highway Patrol (Sgt. David Moreno, Sgt. Cody McCoy, & Tpr. Kade Loveland), Nye County (NV) Sheriff's Office (Dep. Michael Connelly & Dep. James Ramos), Jeffersonville (IN) Police Department (Ofc. Tom O'Neil, Sgt. Denver Leverett with K9 Flex, Ofc. Levi James, & Cpl. Rick Ashabranner), El Paso Police Department (Ofc. Efrain Carrillo), and Spokane County Sheriff's Department (Dep. Spenser Rassier)
86	24	"01.06.18"	January 6, 2018	1.902
Guest analyst: Sgt. Sean "Sticks" Larkin of the Tulsa (OK) Police Department Gang Unit; Departments and officers featured include: El Paso (TX) Police Department (Ofc. Andrea Zendejas, Ofc. Nathan Daniel, & Ofc. Sharon Esparza), Pasco County (FL) Sheriff's Office (Dep. Courtland Harrison, Dep. Ashley Frame, Dep. Stephen Gibson, & Dep. Chris Ramos), Richland County (SC) Sheriff's Department (Sgt. Steven Tapler & Cpl. Mark Laureano), Pinal County (AZ) Sheriff's Office (Dep. Jeff McElwain & Dep. Jesus Soto), Nye County (NV) Sheriff's Office (Dep. Michael Connelly & Dep. James Ramos), Jeffersonville (IN) Police Department (Ofc. Cody Richardson, Ofc. Levi James, & Cpl. Rick Ashabranner), Spokane County Sheriff's Department (Dep. Joel Gorham), Utah Highway Patrol (Sgt. David Moreno), Clark County (IN) Sheriff's Office (Sgt. Erik Elliott)
87	25	"01.12.18"	January 12, 2018	2.093
Guest analyst: Sgt. David Moreno and Commr. Keith D. Squires of the Utah Highway Patrol; Departments and officers featured include: El Paso (TX) Police Department (Ofc. Andrea Zendejas & Ofc. Shaulin Marquez), Pasco County (FL) Sheriff's Office (Dep. Danny Lugo-Felix & Dep. Mark Pini with K9 Yogi), Richland County (SC) Sheriff's Department (S/D Garo Brown, S/D Chris Mastrianni, & Dep. Kyle Oliver), Utah Highway Patrol (Sgt. Cody McCoy & Sgt. Ellis Alexander), Slidell (LA) Police Department (Ofc. Bryant Estes & Ofc. Justin Stokes with K9 Scout), and Nye County (NV) Sheriff's Office (Dep. Michael Connelly, Dep. James Ramos, & Sheriff Sharon Wehrly)
88	26	"01.13.18"	January 13, 2018	2.086
Guest analyst: Sgt. David Moreno of the Utah Highway Patrol; Departments and officers featured include: El Paso (TX) Police Department (Ofc. Andrea Zendejas & Ofc. Shaulin Marquez), Pasco County (FL) Sheriff's Office (Dep. Danny Lugo-Felix, Dep. Mark Pini with K9 Yogi, Dep. Nick Carmack with K9 Shep, Cpl. Steven Walker, & Dep. Courtland Harrison), Richland County (SC) Sheriff's Department (Dep. Kevin Lawrence, Dep. DonnyRay Campbell, Cpl. David Fairbanks, & S/D David Farr), Pinal County (AZ) Sheriff's Office (Dep. Ivan Iniguez, Dep. Zach Wheeler with K9 Oscar, & Dep. Ken Nardelli), Slidell (LA) Police Department (Ofc. Bryant Estes & Ofc. Justin Stokes with K9 Scout), Nye County (NV) Sheriff's Office (Dep. Michael Connelly & Dep. James Ramos), Spokane County (WA) Sheriff's Office (Dep. Jason Hunt with K9 Gunnar, Dep. Brandon Cinkovich, & Dep. Byron Zlateff), Jeffersonville (IN) Police Department (Ofc. Cody Richardson & Ofc. Brian Wyatt), and Lake County (IL) Sheriff's Office (Dep. Marcus Bernardy)
89	27	"01.19.18"	January 19, 2018	1.859
Guest analyst: Sgt. Sean "Sticks" Larkin of the Tulsa (OK) Police Department Gang Unit; Departments and officers featured include: El Paso (TX) Police Department (Ofc. Andrea Zendejas, Ofc. Shaulin Marquez, Ofc. Raul Valdez, Ofc. Felipe Bermudez, & Ofc. David Acosta), Pasco County (FL) Sheriff's Office (Dep. Shannon Henrici, Dep. Ryan Lennox with K9 Jango, & Dep. Chris Ramos), Richland County (SC) Sheriff's Department (Dep. Kevin Lawrence, S/D Chris Mastrianni, & Cpl. Mark Laureano), Utah Highway Patrol (Sgt. Zach Randall & Sgt. Ellis Alexander), Slidell (LA) Police Department (Ofc. Bryant Estes & Ofc. Justin Stokes with K9 Scout), Jeffersonville (IN) Police Department (Ofc. Tom O'Neil, Sgt. Denver Leverett with K9 Flex, Cpl. Rick Ashabranner, Ofc. Ashley Humphreys), and Lake County (IL) Sheriff's Office (Dep. John Hird)
90	28	"01.20.18"	January 20, 2018	1.966
Guest analyst: Sgt. Sean "Sticks" Larkin of the Tulsa (OK) Police Department Gang Unit; Departments and officers featured include: Nye County (NV) Sheriff's Office (Dep. Michael Connelly & Dep. James Ramos), Pasco County (FL) Sheriff's Office (Dep. Shannon Henrici & Dep. Ryan Lennox with K9 Jango), Richland County (SC) Sheriff's Department (Dep. Kevin Lawrence, M/D Chris Blanding, & Cpl. Mark Laureano, Lt. Stacey Davis), Pinal County (AZ) Sheriff's Office (Dep. Jeff McElwain & Dep. Jesus Soto), Slidell (LA) Police Department (Ofc. Charles Escue & Ofc. Justin Stokes with K9 Scout), Jeffersonville (IN) Police Department (Ofc. Levi James, Ofc. Chris Campbell & Ofc Susan Woodard with K9 Blitz), Spokane County (WA) Sheriff's Office (Dep. Joel Gorham), and El Paso (TX) Police Department (Ofc. Nathan Daniel & Ofc. Jesus Melendez)
91	29	"01.26.18"	January 26, 2018	2.031
Guest analyst: Sgt. Sean "Sticks" Larkin of the Tulsa (OK) Police Department Gang Unit; Departments and officers featured include: El Paso (TX) Police Department (Ofc. Andrea Zendejas & Ofc. Felipe Bermudez), Pasco County (FL) Sheriff's Office (Dep. Danny Lugo-Felix, Dep. Nick Carmack with K9 Shep, Dep. Shannon Henrici), Richland County (SC) Sheriff's Department (Cpl. Mark Laureano, Dep. DonnyRay Campbell, M/D Chris Blanding, & Lt. Danny Brown), Pinal County (AZ) Sheriff's Office (Dep. Jeff McElwain & Dep. Jesus Soto), Slidell (LA) Police Department (Ofc. Bryant Estes & Ofc. Justin Stokes with K9 Scout), Jeffersonville (IN) Police Department (Ofc. Tom O'Neil & Sgt. Denver Leverett with K9 Flex), Spokane County (WA) Sheriff's Office (Dep. Joel Gorham), and Lake County (IL) Sheriff's Office (Dep. John Hird)
92	30	"01.27.18"	January 27, 2018	2.095
Guest analyst: Sgt. Sean "Sticks" Larkin of the Tulsa (OK) Police Department Gang Unit; Departments and officers featured include: El Paso (TX) Police Department (Ofc. Andrea Zendejas & Ofc. Nathan Daniel), Pasco County (FL) Sheriff's Office (Dep. Mike Reckmeyer, Dep. Nick Carmack with K9 Shep, Dep. Mike Sentner), Richland County (SC) Sheriff's Department (Lt. Danny Brown & Sgt. Steven Tapler), Utah Highway Patrol (Sgt. Cody McCoy & Sgt. Jeff Adams), Nye County (NV) Sheriff's Office (Dep. Michael Connelly & Dep. James Ramos), Jeffersonville (IN) Police Department (Ofc. Levi James & Ofc. Darin Broady), and Lake County (IL) Sheriff's Office (Det. Matt Harmon)
93	31	"02.02.18"	February 2, 2018	1.798
Guest analyst: Sgt. Sean "Sticks" Larkin of the Tulsa (OK) Police Department Gang Unit; Departments and officers featured include: El Paso (TX) Police Department (Ofc. Andrea Zendejas, Ofc. Felipe Bermudez, & Ofc. Julian Peña), Pasco County (FL) Sheriff's Office (Dep. Justin Pullara, Sgt. Clint Cabbage with K9 Fin, & Dep. April Rodriguez), Richland County (SC) Sheriff's Department (Dep. Kevin Lawrence, S/D Chris Mastrianni, Cpl. Mark Laureano, & S/D Kristy Boyles), Utah Highway Patrol (Sgt. Cody McCoy, Sgt. Ellis Alexander, & Sgt. Zach Randall), Slidell (LA) Police Department (Ofc. Bryant Estes & Ofc. Justin Stokes with K9 Scout), Nye County (NV) Sheriff's Office (Dep. Michael Connelly, Dep. Sedrick Sweet, & Dep. James Ramos), and Jeffersonville (IN) Police Department (Ofc. Cody Richardson)
94	32	"02.03.18"	February 3, 2018	2.097
Guest analyst: Sgt. Sean "Sticks" Larkin of the Tulsa (OK) Police Department Gang Unit; Departments and officers featured include: El Paso (TX) Police Department (Ofc. Andrea Zendejas, Ofc. Shaulin Marquez, Ofc. Efrain Carrillo, & Ofc. Julian Peña), Pasco County (FL) Sheriff's Office (Dep. Jacob Baroff, Sgt. Clint Cabbage with K9 Fin, & Cpl. Chris Crawford), Richland County (SC) Sheriff's Department (Lt. Danny Brown & M/D Chris Blanding), Pinal County (AZ) Sheriff's Office (Dep. Jeff McElwain, Dep. Tanner Farnsworth, & Dep. Ivan Iniguez), Slidell (LA) Police Department (Ofc. Bryant Estes & Ofc. Justin Stokes with K9 Scout), Jeffersonville (IN) Police Department (Ofc. Levi James & Ofc. Darin Broady), and Utah Highway Patrol (Lt. Steve Salas)
95	33	"02.16.18"	February 16, 2018	1.867
Guest analyst: Sgt. Sean "Sticks" Larkin of the Tulsa (OK) Police Department Gang Unit; Departments and officers featured include: El Paso (TX) Police Department (Ofc. Felipe Bermudez, Ofc. Shaulin Marquez, & Ofc. Ramiro Garza), Pasco County (FL) Sheriff's Office (Dep. Shannon Henrici, Dep. Justin Pullara, & Dep. Michael Reckmeyer), Richland County (SC) Sheriff's Department (Dep. Kevin Lawrence, S/D Chris Mastrianni, & Cpl. Mark Laureano), Pinal County (AZ) Sheriff's Office (Dep. Jeff McElwain, Dep. Jesus Soto, & Dep. Tanner Farnsworth), Slidell (LA) Police Department (Ofc. Bryant Estes, Ofc. Jake Morris with K9 Kano, & Det. Scott O'Shaughnessy), Nye County (NV) Sheriff's Office (Lt. David Boruchowitz, Dep. Michael Connelly, & Dep. Eric Anderson), and Utah Highway Patrol (Lt. Steve Salas)
96	34	"02.17.18"	February 17, 2018	2.007
Guest analyst: Sgt. Sean "Sticks" Larkin of the Tulsa (OK) Police Department Gang Unit; Departments and officers featured include: El Paso (TX) Police Department (Ofc. Andrea Zendejas, Ofc. Nathan Daniel, & Ofc. Jonny Longenbaugh), Pasco County (FL) Sheriff's Office (Dep. Justin Pullara, Sgt. Clint Cabbage with K9 Fin, Cpl. Chris Bukowiecki, Dep. Thomas Marrero-Bruno, & Dep. Jacob Baroff), Richland County (SC) Sheriff's Department (Cpl. Mark Laureano, Dep. Addy Perez, & Dep. Jacob Murphy), Fort Bend County (TX) Sheriff's Office (Dep. JD Delgado & Dep. Chris Arias), Slidell (LA) Police Department (Ofc. Bryant Estes, Ofc. Jake Morris with K9 Kano, Ofc. Charles Goleman & Ofc. Justin Stokes with K9 Scout), Clark County (IN) Sheriff's Office (Sgt. Erik Elliott & Ofc. Wes Harper), and Pinal County (AZ) Sheriff's Office (Dep. Jesus Soto)
97	35	"02.23.18"	February 23, 2018	1.697
Guest analyst: Sgt. Sean "Sticks" Larkin of the Tulsa (OK) Police Department Gang Unit; Departments and officers featured include: El Paso (TX) Police Department (Ofc. Andrea Zendejas & Ofc. Shaulin Marquez), Pasco County (FL) Sheriff's Office (Dep. Mike Reckmeyer, Dep. Nick Carmack with K9 Shep, & Dep. Danny Lugo-Felix), Richland County (SC) Sheriff's Department (Lt. Danny Brown, M/D Chris Blanding, Dep. DonnyRay Campbell, & Cpl. David Fairbanks), Pinal County (AZ) Sheriff's Office (Dep. Jeff McElwain & Dep. Jesus Soto), Slidell (LA) Police Department (Det. Scott O'Shaughnessy, Ofc. Clint McCall with K9 Quest, Ofc. Justin Stokes, & Ofc. Joe Hirstius), and Nye County (NV) Sheriff's Office (Lt. David Boruchowitz, Dep. Michael Connelly, Lt. Eric Murphy, Dep. Bryan Cooper, & Dep. Sedrick Sweet)
98	36	"02.24.18"	February 24, 2018	1.831
Guest analyst: Sgt. Sean "Sticks" Larkin of the Tulsa (OK) Police Department Gang Unit; Departments and officers featured include: El Paso (TX) Police Department (Ofc. Andrea Zendejas, Ofc. Felipe Bermudez, & Ofc. John Spencer), Pasco County (FL) Sheriff's Office (Cpl. Chris Bukowiecki, Dep. Mike Reckmeyer, Dep. Justin Pullara, Sgt. Adam Cinelli, & Dep. Mike Toldo), Richland County (SC) Sheriff's Department (Sgt. Steven Tapler, S/D Garo Brown, & Cpl. David Fairbanks), Pinal County (AZ) Sheriff's Office (Dep. Jeff McElwain, Dep. Ivan Iniguez & Dep. Mark Terry), Fort Bend County (TX) Sheriff's Office (Dep. JD Delgado, Dep. Chris Arias, Sgt. Mary Torres, & Dep. John Davis), Clark County (IN) Sheriff's Office (Sgt. Erik Elliott, Ofc. Wes Harper, & Ofc. Charles Scott), Nye County (NV) Sheriff's Office (Dep. Josh Teter), and Slidell (LA) Police Department (Ofc. Jake Morris)
99	37	"03.02.18"	March 2, 2018	1.687
Guest analyst: Dep. Jeff McElwain of the Pinal County (AZ) Sheriff's Office; Departments and officers featured include: El Paso (TX) Police Department (Ofc. Andrea Zendejas, Ofc. Shaulin Marquez, Ofc. Ray Priego, Ofc. Julian Peña), Pasco County (FL) Sheriff's Office (Dep. Justin Pullara, Cpl. Mike Barrow, Dep. Cliff Baltzer with K9 Tundra, Dep. Mike Reckmeyer, & Dep. Nick Carmack with K9 Shep), Richland County (SC) Sheriff's Department (S/D Garo Brown, Dep. DonnyRay Campbell & Dep. Josh Newsom with K9 Bali), Pinal County (AZ) Sheriff's Office (Dep. Jesus Soto, Dep. Ali Martinez, & Dep. Zachary Wheeler), Slidell (LA) Police Department (Ofc. Charles Esque & Ofc. Jake Morris with K9 Kano), Fort Bend County (TX) Sheriff's Office (Dep. JD Delgado & Dep. Chris Arias), and Nye County (NV) Sheriff's Office (Dep. Sedrick Sweet)
100	38	"03.03.18"	March 3, 2018	1.876
Guest analyst: Dep. Jeff McElwain of the Pinal County (AZ) Sheriff's Office; Departments and officers featured include: El Paso (TX) Police Department (Ofc. Andrea Zendejas, Ofc. Sergio Salcido, & Ofc. Albert Daugherty), Pasco County (FL) Sheriff's Office (Dep. Justin Pullara & Cpl. Mike Barrow), Richland County (SC) Sheriff's Department (Cpl. Mark Laureano, Dep. Addy Perez, Dep. Robert Beary, & S/D Chris Mastrianni), Nye County (NV) Sheriff's Office (Lt. David Boruchowitz, Lt. Eric Murphy, Sheriff Sharon Wehrly, Dep. Mark Murphy, Det. Alex Cox, Dep. Sedrick Sweet, & Dep. Michael Connelly), Slidell (LA) Police Department (Ofc. Charles Esque & Ofc. Jake Morris with K9 Kano), Clark County (IN) Sheriff's Office (Sgt. Erik Elliott & Ofc. Charles Scott), and Spokane County (WA) Sheriff's Office (Dep. Jason Hunt)
101	39	"03.09.18"	March 9, 2018	1.852
Guest analyst: Sgt. Sean "Sticks" Larkin of the Tulsa (OK) Police Department Gang Unit; Eight departments were followed for the first time to celebrate the 100th episode; Departments and officers featured include: El Paso (TX) Police Department (Ofc. Andrea Zendejas, Ofc. Shaulin Marquez, & Ofc. Julian Peña), Pasco County (FL) Sheriff's Office (Dep. Mike Reckmeyer & Dep. Nick Carmack with K9 Shep), Richland County (SC) Sheriff's Department (Dep. Kevin Lawrence, S/D Chris Mastrianni, Cpl. Mark Laureano, & Cpl. David Fairbanks), Jeffersonville (IN) Police Department (Ofc. Tom O'Neil & Sgt. Denver Leverett with K9 Flex), Nye County (NV) Sheriff's Office (Lt. David Boruchowitz & Dep. Sedrick Sweet), Slidell (LA) Police Department (Ofc. Justin Stokes with K9 Scout, Ofc. Bryant Estes, Ofc. Clint McCall with K9 Quest, & Ofc. Jake Morris), Fort Bend County (TX) Sheriff's Office (Dep. JD Delgado), and Pinal County (AZ) Sheriff's Office (Dep. Jeff McElwain)
102	40	"03.10.18"	March 10, 2018	1.959
Guest analyst: Sgt. Sean "Sticks" Larkin of the Tulsa (OK) Police Department Gang Unit; Departments and officers featured include: El Paso (TX) Police Department (Ofc. Andrea Zendejas, Ofc. Felipe Bermudez, Ofc. Isaac Rodriguez, Ofc. Julian Peña, & Ofc. Luigi Garcia), Pasco County (FL) Sheriff's Office (Cpl. Chris Bukowiecki & Dep. Nick Carmack with K9 Shep), Richland County (SC) Sheriff's Department (Dep. Addy Perez, Cpl. Mark Laureano, & Dep. DonnyRay Campbell), Jeffersonville (IN) Police Department (Ofc. Levi James & Ofc. Chris Campbell), Nye County (NV) Sheriff's Office (Lt. David Boruchowitz, Lt. Eric Murphy & Dep. James Ramos), Slidell (LA) Police Department (Ofc. Justin Stokes with K9 Scout, Ofc. Bryant Estes, & Ofc. Charles Goleman), Fort Bend County (TX) Sheriff's Office (Dep. JD Delgado & Dep. Chris Arias), and Pinal County (AZ) Sheriff's Office (Dep. Ivan Iniguez & Dep. Zachary Wheeler with K9 Oscar)
103	41	"03.16.18"	March 16, 2018	1.953
Guest analyst: Sgt. Sean "Sticks" Larkin of the Tulsa (OK) Police Department Gang Unit and Marcia Clark; Departments and officers featured include: El Paso (TX) Police Department (Ofc. Andrea Zendejas, Ofc. Felipe Bermudez, Ofc. Jorge Carreon, & Ofc. Susan Granados), Pasco County (FL) Sheriff's Office (Dep. David Schaub, Sgt. Clint Cabbage with K9 Fin, Dep. Mike Reckmeyer, & Cpl. Chris Bukowiecki), Richland County (SC) Sheriff's Department (Cpl. Mark Laureano & Dep. DonnyRay Campbell), Pinal County (AZ) Sheriff's Office (Sheriff Mark Lamb & Dep. Jeff McElwain), Greene County (MO) Sheriff's Office (Dep. Jordan Lilley, Dep. Morgan Rudderham, & Sheriff Jim Arnott), Nye County (NV) Sheriff's Office (Lt. David Boruchowitz, Dep. James Ramos, & Lt. Eric Murphy), Slidell (LA) Police Department (Ofc. Bryant Estes, Ofc. Jake Morris with K9 Kano, Ofc. Charles Esque & Ofc. Joe Hirstius), and Clark County (IN) Sheriff's Office (Capt. Mark Meyer & Sgt. Erik Elliott)
104	42	"03.17.18"	March 17, 2018	1.986
Guest analyst: Sgt. Sean "Sticks" Larkin of the Tulsa (OK) Police Department Gang Unit; Departments and officers featured include: El Paso (TX) Police Department (Ofc. Andrea Zendejas, Ofc. Shaulin Marquez, Ofc. Daniel Monge, Ofc. Brenda De La Riva, & Ofc. Julian Peña), Pasco County (FL) Sheriff's Office (Dep. David Schaub & Dep. Mike Sentner with K9 Yager), Richland County (SC) Sheriff's Department (Lt. Danny Brown & M/D Chris Blanding), Pinal County (AZ) Sheriff's Office (Sheriff Mark Lamb & Dep. Jeff McElwain), Greene County (MO) Sheriff's Office (Dep. Jordan Lilley & Dep. Morgan Rudderham), Nye County (NV) Sheriff's Office (Lt. Eric Murphy, Dep. James Ramos, & Dep. John Powell), Fort Bend County (TX) Sheriff's Office (Dep. Jordan Smith & Dep. JD Delgado), and Clark County (IN) Sheriff's Office (Sgt. Erik Elliott & Ofc. Wes Harper)
105	43	"03.23.18"	March 23, 2018	2.008
Guest analyst: Sgt. Sean "Sticks" Larkin of the Tulsa (OK) Police Department Gang Unit; Departments and officers featured include: El Paso (TX) Police Department (Ofc. Felipe Bermudez & Ofc. Brenda De La Riva), Pasco County (FL) Sheriff's Office (Dep. Tiffany Bronson, Dep. Mark Pini with K9 Yogi, Dep. Nick Carmack with K9 Shep, & Dep. Mike Reckmeyer), Richland County (SC) Sheriff's Department (Dep. Addy Perez, Sgt. Steven Tapler & Cpl. David Fairbanks), Slidell (LA) Police Department (Ofc. Shawn Chopin, Ofc. Clint McCall with K9 Quest, & Ofc. Jake Morris), Greene County (MO) Sheriff's Office (Dep. Jordan Lilley, Dep. Morgan Rudderham, & Cpl. James Craigmyle with K9 Lor), Nye County (NV) Sheriff's Office (Lt. James McRae & Dep. Michael Connelly), Pinal County (AZ) Sheriff's Office (Dep. Jeff McElwain & Dep. Tanner Farnsworth) and Clark County (IN) Sheriff's Office (Ofc. Charles Scott)
106	44	"03.24.18"	March 24, 2018	2.053
Guest analyst: Sgt. Sean "Sticks" Larkin of the Tulsa (OK) Police Department Gang Unit; Departments and officers featured include: El Paso (TX) Police Department (Ofc. Lugardo Garcia, Ofc. Sergio Salcdio, Ofc. Christopher Davis, & Ofc. Hector Garcia), Pasco County (FL) Sheriff's Office (Dep. Mike Reckmeyer, Dep. Mark Pini with K9 Yogi, Dep. Justin Pullara & Cpl. Chris Bukowiecki), Richland County (SC) Sheriff's Department (S/D Garo Brown & Dep. Addy Perez), Slidell (LA) Police Department (Ofc. Theresa Simon, Ofc. Clint McCall with K9 Quest, & Ofc. Jake Morris), Greene County (MO) Sheriff's Office (Dep. Morgan Rudderham, & Cpl. James Craigmyle with K9 Lor), Nye County (NV) Sheriff's Office (Lt. David Boruchowitz, Lt. Eric Murphy, Dep. James Ramos, & Ofc. Susan Ryhal), Fort Bend County (TX) Sheriff's Office (Dep. JD Delgado & Dep. Chris Arias), Clark County (IN) Sheriff's Office (Ofc. Wes Harper), and Utah Highway Patrol (Sgt. Nick Street)
107	45	"04.06.18"	April 6, 2018	1.900
Guest Analyst: Sgt. Sean "Sticks" Larkin of the Tulsa (OK) Police Department Gang Unit; Departments and officers featured include: El Paso (TX) Police Department (Ofc. Andrea Zendejas, Ofc. Felipe Bermudez, Ofc. Lugardo Garcia, & Ofc. Jorge Carreon), Pasco County (FL) Sheriff's Office (Dep. Tiffany Bronson & Dep. Mark Pini with K9 Yogi), Richland County (SC) Sheriff's Department (S/D Garo Brown, Dep. Kelly Smith, & S/D Chris Mastrianni), Slidell (LA) Police Department (Ofc. Clint McCall with K9 Quest & Ofc. Theresa Simon), Greene County (MO) Sheriff's Office (Sheriff Jim Arnott & Cpl. James Craigmyle with K9 Lor), Nye County (NV) Sheriff's Office (Det. Alex Cox, & Dep. Jason Yelle), Pinal County (AZ) Sheriff's Office (Dep. Jeff McElwain & Dep. Tanner Farnsworth) and Fort Bend County (TX) Sheriff's Office (Dep. Jordan Smith)
108	46	"04.07.18"	April 7, 2018	2.150
Guest Analyst: Sgt. Sean "Sticks" Larkin of the Tulsa (OK) Police Department Gang Unit; Departments and officers featured include: Fort Bend County (TX) Sheriff's Office (Dep. JD Delgado, Dep. Chris Arias & Dep. Justin Cloud), Pasco County (FL) Sheriff's Office (Dep. Mike Reckmeyer, Dep. Nick Carmack with K9 Shep, & Dep. Chris Ramos), Richland County (SC) Sheriff's Department (Cpl. Mark Laureano, M/D Chris Blanding & Dep. Jacob Murphy), Slidell (LA) Police Department (Ofc. Clint McCall with K9 Quest, Ofc. Theresa Simon & Ofc. Shawn Chopin), Greene County (MO) Sheriff's Office (Sheriff Jim Arnott, Cpl, James Craigmyle with K9 Lor, & Dep. Morgan Rudderham), Nye County (NV) Sheriff's Office (Lt . James McRae, Dep. Michael Connelly & Dep. Bryan Cooper), Pinal County (AZ) Sheriff's Office (Dep. Dalton Gay & Dep. Steve Hall), and El Paso (TX) Police Department (Ofc. Shaulin Marquez)
109	47	"04.13.18"	April 13, 2018	1.808
Guest Analyst: Sgt. Sean "Sticks" Larkin of the Tulsa Police Department Gang Unit; Departments and officers featured include: El Paso (TX) Police Department (Ofc. Andrea Zendejas, Ofc. Felipe Bermudez, Ofc. Lugardo Garcia, Ofc. Jorge Carreon, & Ofc. Gus Sias), Pasco County (FL) Sheriff's Office (Dep. Michael Sudler, & Dep. Mike Sentner with K9 Yager), Richland County (SC) Sheriff's Department (Lt. Danny Brown, Sgt. Steven Tapler, & Cpl. David Fairbanks), Nye County (NV) Sheriff's Office (Lt. David Boruchowitz & Lt. Eric Murphy) Greene County (MO) Sheriff's Office (Dep. Morgan Rudderham, Cpl. James Craigmyle with K9 Lor, & Dep. Tommy Connell), Slidell (LA) Police Department (Ofc. Theresa Simon & Ofc. Bryant Estes), and Fort Bend County (TX) Sheriff's Office (Dep. JD Delgado & Dep. Justin Cloud with K9 Duco)
110	48	"04.14.18"	April 14, 2018	1.913
Guest Analyst: Sgt. Sean "Sticks" Larkin of the Tulsa Police Department Gang Unit; Departments and officers featured include: El Paso (TX) Police Department (Ofc. Andrea Zendejas, Ofc. Felipe Bermudez, Ofc. Arturo Flores, Ofc. Sergio Salcido, & Ofc. Jorge Carreon), Pasco County (FL) Sheriff's Office (Dep. Michael Sudler, Dep. Brain Hernandez with K9 Doc, & Dep. Danny Lugo-Felix), Richland County (SC) Sheriff's Department (S/D Garo Brown, Dep. Kelly Smith, & Lt. Danny Brown), Nye County (NV) Sheriff's Office (Dep. Michael Connelly, & Dep. James Ramos), Greene County (MO) Sheriff's Office (Dep. Morgan Rudderham, Cpl. James Craigmyle with K9 Lor, & Dep. Tim Haynes), Slidell (LA) Police Department (Ofc. Theresa Simon & Ofc. Jake Morris with K9 Kano), and Pinal County (AZ) Sheriff's Office (Sheriff Mark Lamb & Dep. Jeff McElwain)
111	49	"04.20.18"	April 20, 2018	1.909
Guest Analyst: Sgt. Sean "Sticks" Larkin of the Tulsa Police Department Gang Unit; Departments and officers featured include: El Paso (TX) Police Department (Ofc. Andrea Zendejas & Ofc. Filipe Bermudez), Pasco County (FL) Sheriff's Office (Cpl. Chris Bukowiecki, Dep. Nick Carmack with K9 Shep, & Dep. Mike Reckmeyer), Richland County (SC) Sheriff's Department (Dep. Addy Perez, Cpl. Mark Laureano, & Lt. Danny Brown), Slidell (LA) Police Department (Ofc. Clint McCall with K9 Quest & Ofc. Brad Peck), Greene County (MO) Sheriff's Office (Dep. Tommy Connell & Cpl. James Craigmyle with K9 Lor), Nye County (NV) Sheriff's Office (Lt. James McRae, Dep. Jason Yelle, & Dep. Eric Anderson), & Pinal County (AZ) Sheriff's Office (Sheriff Mark Lamb & Dep. Jeff McElwain)
112	50	"04.21.18"	April 21, 2018	1.858
Guest Analyst: Sgt. Sean "Sticks" Larkin of the Tulsa Police Department Gang Unit; Departments and officers featured include: El Paso (TX) Police Department (Ofc. Andrea Zendejas, Ofc. Felipe Bermudez, & Ofc. Jorge Carreon), Pasco County (FL) Sheriff's Office (Dep. Chris Bukowiecki, Dep. Danny Lugo-Felix, & Dep. Scott Cochrane), Richland County (SC) Sheriff's Department (Dep. Kevin Lawrence & Dep. DonnyRay Campbell), Slidell (LA) Police Department (Ofc. Clint McCall with K9 Quest, Ofc. Brad Peck, & Ofc. Jake Morris with K9 Kano), Greene County (MO) Sheriff's Office (Dep. Tommy Connell & Cpl. James Craigmyle with K9 Lor), Nye County (NV) Sheriff's Office (Dep. Jason Yelle & Dep. James Ramos), and Fort Bend (TX) Sheriff's Office (Dep. JD Delgado & Dep. Justin Cloud with K9 Duco)
113	51	"04.27.18"	April 27, 2018	1.871
Departments and officers featured include: El Paso (TX) Police Department (Ofc. Andrea Zendejas, Ofc. Felipe Bermudez), Pasco County (FL) Sheriff's Office (Dep. Michael Sudler & Cpl. Mike Barrow), Richland County (SC) Sheriff's Department (Lt. Danny Brown & S/D Garo Brown), Greene County (MO) Sheriff's Office (Dep. Jason Miller & Cpl. James Craigmyle with K9 Lor), Nye County (NV) Sheriff's Office (Dep. Jason Yelle & Det. Alex Cox), Pinal County (AZ) Sheriff's Office (Sheriff Mark Lamb & Dep. Ali Martinez), and Fort Bend (TX) Sheriff's Office (Dep. JD Delgado & Dep. Justin Cloud with K9 Duco)
114	52	"04.28.18"	April 28, 2018	1.984
Departments and officers featured include: El Paso (TX) Police Department (Ofc. Andrea Zendejas & Ofc. Jorge Carreon), Pasco County (FL) Sheriff's Office (Dep. Michael Sudler & Dep. David Straub), Richland County (SC) Sheriff's Department (Sgt. Steven Tapler & Dep. Addy Perez), Greene County (MO) Sheriff's Office (Dep. Tommy Connell & Cpl. James Craigmyle with K9 Lor), Nye County (NV) Sheriff's Office (Dep. Jason Yelle & Dep. James Ramos), Pinal County (AZ) Sheriff's Office (Sheriff Mark Lamb & Dep. Ali Martinez), Slidell (LA) Police Department (Ofc. Jake Morris with K9 Kano & Ofc. Brad Peck), and Fort Bend (TX) Sheriff's Office (Dep. JD Delgado & Dep. Justin Cloud with K9 Duco)
115	53	"05.04.18"	May 4, 2018	1.769
Departments and officers featured include: El Paso (TX) Police Department (Ofc. Andrea Zendejas & Ofc. Sergio Salcido), Pasco County (FL) Sheriff's Office (Cpl. Chris Bukowiecki & Dep. Danny Lugo-Felix), Richland County (SC) Sheriff's Department (Dep. Addy Perez & Cpl. Mark Laureano), Greene County (MO) Sheriff's Office (Cpl. James Craigmyle with K9 Lor & Dep. Tommy Connell), Nye County (NV) Sheriff's Office (Det. Alex Cox & Dep. Jason Yelle), Slidell (LA) Police Department (Ofc. Jake Morris with K9 Kano & Ofc. Brad Peck), Gwinnett County (GA) Sheriff's Office (M/D Mike Baker & M/D Lance Laraby)
116	54	"05.05.18"	May 5, 2018	1.915
Departments and officers featured include: El Paso (TX) Police Department (Ofc. Andrea Zendejas & Ofc. Brenda De La Riva), Pasco County (FL) Sheriff's Office (Cpl. Chris Bukowiecki & Dep. Danny Lugo-Felix), Richland County (SC) Sheriff's Department (M/D Chris Blanding & Deputy Josh Newson with K9 Bali), Greene County (MO) Sheriff's Office (Cpl. James Craigmyle with K9 Lor & Dep. Tommy Connell), Nye County (NV) Sheriff's Office (Lt. Eric Murphy & Dep. Bryan Cooper), Slidell (LA) Police Department (Ofc. Jake Morris with K9 Kano & Ofc. Brad Peck), and Pinal County (AZ) Sheriff's Office (Sheriff Mark Lamb & Dep. Steve Hall)
117	55	"05.11.18"	May 11, 2018	1.839
Departments and officers featured include: El Paso (TX) Police Department (Ofc. Felipe Bermudez & Ofc. Thomas Sneed), Pasco County (FL) Sheriff's Office (Dep. Michael Sudler & Dep. David Shaub), Richland County (SC) Sheriff's Department (Dep. Kevin Lawrence & S/D Garo Brown), Greene County (MO) Sheriff's Office (Dep. Tommy Connell & Dep. Tim Haynes), Nye County (NV) Sheriff's Office (Det. Alex Cox & Lt. James McRae), Slidell (LA) Police Department (Ofc. Jake Morris with K9 Kano & Det. Daniel Seuzeneau), and Pinal County (AZ) Sheriff's Office (Sheriff Mark Lamb & Dep. Jeff McElwain)
118	56	"05.12.18"	May 12, 2018	1.738
Departments and officers featured include: El Paso (TX) Police Department (Ofc. Andrea Zendejas & Ofc. Susan Granados), Pasco County (FL) Sheriff's Office (Dep. Michael Sudler & Dep. Brian Hernandez with K9 Doc), Richland County (SC) Sheriff's Department (Dep. Addy Perez & Cpl. Mark Laureano), Greene County (MO) Sheriff's Office (Cpl. James Craigmyle with K9 Lor & Dep. Tim Haynes), Nye County (NV) Sheriff's Office (Det. Alex Cox & Dep. Jason Yelle), Slidell (LA) Police Department (Ofc. Clint McCall with K9 Quest & Det. Daniel Seuzeneau), and Gwinnett County (GA) Sheriff's Office (M/D Mike Baker & M/D Lance Laraby)
119	57	"06.01.18"	June 1, 2018	2.044
Departments and officers featured include: El Paso (TX) Police Department (Ofc. Andrea Zendejas & Ofc. Felipe Bermudez), Pasco County (FL) Sheriff's Office (Dep. Mike Reckmeyer & Dep. Nick Carmack with K9 Shep), Richland County (SC) Sheriff's Department (Dep. Addy Perez & Sgt. Steven Tapler), Greene County (MO) Sheriff's Office (Dep. Dustin Kendrick with K9 Stark & Dep. Natalia Bailey), Nye County (NV) Sheriff's Office (Det. Alex Cox & Dep. Jason Yelle), Warwick (RI) Police Department (Sgt. John Curley & Ofc. Aaron Steere with K9 Viking), Pinal County (AZ) Sheriff's Office (Sheriff Mark Lamb & Dep. Jeff McElwain), and Gwinnett County (GA) Sheriff's Office (M/D Mike Baker & M/D Lance Laraby)
120	58	"06.02.18"	June 2, 2018	2.051
Departments and officers featured include: El Paso (TX) Police Department (Ofc. Andrea Zendejas & Ofc. Felipe Bermudez), Pasco County (FL) Sheriff's Office (Dep. Chris Ramos & Dep. Nick Carmack with K9 Shep), Richland County (SC) Sheriff's Department (Dep. Kevin Lawrence & Cpl. Mark Laureano), Greene County (MO) Sheriff's Office (Dep. Dustin Kendrick with K9 Stark & Dep. Natalia Bailey), Nye County (NV) Sheriff's Office (Lt. David Boruchowitz & Dep. James Ramos), Warwick (RI) Police Department (Sgt. John Curley & Ofc. Aaron Steere with K9 Viking), Pinal County (AZ) Sheriff's Office (Dep. Catherine Rybka & Dep. Steve Hall), and Gwinnett County (GA) Sheriff's Office (M/D Mike Baker & M/D Lance Laraby)
121	59	"06.08.18"	June 8, 2018	1.957
Departments and officers featured include: El Paso (TX) Police Department (Ofc. Felipe Bermudez & Ofc. Thomas Sneed), Pasco County (FL) Sheriff's Office (Dep. Justin Lawless & Dep. Chris Stockton with K9 Jango), Richland County (SC) Sheriff's Department (M/D Chris Blanding & Dep. Josh Newsom[e?] with K9 Bali), Greene County (MO) Sheriff's Office (Dep. Dustin Kendrick with K9 Stark & Dep. Morgan Rudderham), Nye County (NV) Sheriff's Office (Lt. David Boruchowitz & Lt. Eric Murphy), Warwick (RI) Police Department (Sgt. John Curley & Ofc. Aaron Steere with K9 Viking), Pinal County (AZ) Sheriff's Office (Sheriff Mark Lamb & Dep. Jeff McElwain), and Gwinnett County (GA) Sheriff's Office (M/D Mike Baker & M/D Lance Laraby)
122	60	"06.09.18"	June 9, 2018	1.908
Departments and officers featured include: El Paso (TX) Police Department (Ofc. Felipe Bermudez & Ofc. Jessica Costa), Pasco County (FL) Sheriff's Office (Dep. Justin Lawless & Dep. Chris Stockton with K9 Jango), Richland County (SC) Sheriff's Department (Lt. Danny Brown & Dep. Jacob Murphy), Greene County (MO) Sheriff's Office (Dep. Dustin Kendrick with K9 Stark & Cpl. James Craigmyle with K9 Lor), Nye County (NV) Sheriff's Office (Det. Alex Cox & Lt. James McRae), Warwick (RI) Police Department (Sgt. John Curley & Ofc. Aaron Steere with K9 Viking), Pinal County (AZ) Sheriff's Office (Sheriff Mark Lamb & Dep. Jeff McElwain), and Gwinnett County (GA) Sheriff's Office (M/D Mike Baker & M/D Lance Laraby)
123	61	"06.15.18"	June 15, 2018	2.014
Departments and officers featured include: El Paso (TX) Police Department (Ofc. Felipe Bermudez & Ofc. Tony Montenegro), Pasco County (FL) Sheriff's Office (Dep. Mike Reckmeyer & Dep. Mark Pini with K9 Yogi), Richland County (SC) Sheriff's Department (Dep. Addy Perez & Cpl. Mark Laureano), Greene County (MO) Sheriff's Office (Dep. Dustin Kendrick with K9 Stark & Cpl. James Craigmyle with K9 Lor), Nye County (NV) Sheriff's Office (Dep. Jason Yelle & Dep. James Ramos), Warwick (RI) Police Department (Ofc. Tim Lipka & Ofc. Aaron Steere with K9 Viking), Pinal County (AZ) Sheriff's Office (Dep. Jeff McElwain & Dep. Ali Martinez), and Gwinnett County (GA) Sheriff's Office (M/D Mike Baker & M/D Lance Laraby)
124	62	"06.16.18"	June 16, 2018	1.884
Departments and officers featured include: El Paso (TX) Police Department (Ofc. Felipe Bermudez & Ofc. Jessica Costa), Pasco County (FL) Sheriff's Office (Dep. Chris Ramos & Dep. Nick Carmack with K9 Shep), Richland County (SC) Sheriff's Department (Dep. Donnyray Campbell & Dep. Josh Newsom[e?] with K9 Bali), Greene County (MO) Sheriff's Office (Dep. Dustin Kendrick with K9 Stark & Cpl. James Craigmyle with K9 Lor), Nye County (NV) Sheriff's Office (Lt. Eric Murphy & Dep. Mike Connelly), Warwick (RI) Police Department (Sgt. John McAniff & Ofc. Aaron Steere with K9 Viking), Pinal County (AZ) Sheriff's Office (Dep. Steve Hall & Dep. Michael Fender), and Gwinnett County (GA) Sheriff's Office (M/D Mike Baker & M/D Lance Laraby)
125	63	"06.22.18"	June 22, 2018	2.078
Departments and officers featured include: El Paso (TX) Police Department (Ofc. Felipe Bermudez & Ofc. Thomas Sneed), Pasco County (FL) Sheriff's Office (Dep. Justin Lawless & Dep. Chris Stockton with K9 Jango), Richland County (SC) Sheriff's Department (M/D Chris Blanding & Dep. Addy Perez), Greene County (MO) Sheriff's Office (Dep. Dustin Kendrick with K9 Stark & Cpl. James Craigmyle with K9 Lor), Nye County (NV) Sheriff's Office (Det. Alex Cox & Dep. Jason Yelle), Warwick (RI) Police Department (Sgt. John Curley & Ofc. Aaron Steere with K9 Viking), Pinal County (AZ) Sheriff's Office (Dep. Jeff McElwain & Dep. Tanner Farnsworth), and Gwinnett County (GA) Sheriff's Office (M/D Mike Baker & M/D Lance Laraby)
126	64	"06.23.18"	June 23, 2018	2.152
Departments and officers featured include: El Paso (TX) Police Department (Ofc. Felipe Bermudez & Ofc. Tony Montenegro), Pasco County (FL) Sheriff's Office (Dep. Justin Lawless & Dep. Chris Stockton with K9 Jango), Richland County (SC) Sheriff's Department (Dep. Kevin Lawrence & Dep. Addy Perez), Greene County (MO) Sheriff's Office (Dep. Dustin Kendrick with K9 Stark & Cpl. James Craigmyle with K9 Lor), Nye County (NV) Sheriff's Office (Det. Alex Cox & Dep. James Ramos), Warwick (RI) Police Department (Sgt. John Curley & Ofc. Aaron Steere with K9 Viking), Pinal County (AZ) Sheriff's Office (Dep. Jeff McElwain & Dep. Ali Martinez), and Gwinnett County (GA) Sheriff's Office (M/D Mike Baker & M/D Lance Laraby)
127	65	"06.29.18"	June 29, 2018	1.919
Departments and officers featured include: El Paso (TX) Police Department (Ofc. Andrea Zendejas & Ofc. Tony Montenegro), Pasco County (FL) Sheriff's Office (Dep. Chris Ramos & Dep. Mark Pini with K9 Yogi), Richland County (SC) Sheriff's Department (S/D Garo Brown & Dep. Kelly Smith), Greene County (MO) Sheriff's Office (Dep. Dustin Kendrick with K9 Stark & Cpl. James Craigmyle with K9 Lor), Nye County (NV) Sheriff's Office (Lt. Eric Murphy & Dep. Mike Connelly), Warwick (RI) Police Department (Sgt. John Curley & Ofc. Aaron Steere with K9 Viking), Pinal County (AZ) Sheriff's Office (Dep. Jeff McElwain & Dep. Ali Martinez), and Gwinnett County (GA) Sheriff's Office (M/D Mike Baker & M/D Lance Laraby)
128	66	"06.30.18"	June 30, 2018	2.093
Departments and officers featured include: El Paso (TX) Police Department (Ofc. Tony Montenegro & Ofc. Jessica Costa), Pasco County (FL) Sheriff's Office (Dep. Mike Reckmeyer & Dep. Mark Pini with K9 Yogi), Richland County (SC) Sheriff's Department (Lt. Danny Brown & M/D Chris Blanding), Greene County (MO) Sheriff's Office (Dep. Dustin Kendrick with K9 Stark & Cpl. James Craigmyle with K9 Lor), Nye County (NV) Sheriff's Office (Lt. James McRae & Det. Alex Cox), Warwick (RI) Police Department (Sgt. John Curley & Ofc. Aaron Steere with K9 Viking), Pinal County (AZ) Sheriff's Office (Sheriff Mark Lamb & Dep. Dalton Gay), and Gwinnett County (GA) Sheriff's Office (M/D Mike Baker & M/D Lance Laraby)
129	67	"07.13.18"	July 13, 2018	1.917
Departments and officers featured include: El Paso (TX) Police Department (Ofc. Andrea Zendejas & Ofc. Thomas Sneed), Pasco County (FL) Sheriff's Office (Dep. Alex Mason & Dep. Nick Carmack with K9 Shep), Richland County (SC) Sheriff's Department (Dep. Kevin Lawrence & S/D Garo Brown), Greene County (MO) Sheriff's Office (Dep. Tim Haynes & Cpl. Jason Flora), Nye County (NV) Sheriff's Office (Dep. Jason Yelle & Dep. James Ramos), Warwick (RI) Police Department (Sgt. John Curley & Ofc. Aaron Steere with K9 Viking), Pinal County (AZ) Sheriff's Office (Sheriff Mark Lamb & Dep. Jeff McElwain), and Gwinnett County (GA) Sheriff's Office (M/D Mike Baker & M/D Lance Laraby)
130	68	"07.14.18"	July 14, 2018	1.842
Departments and officers featured include: El Paso (TX) Police Department (Ofc. Andrea Zendejas & Ofc. Thomas Sneed), Pasco County (FL) Sheriff's Office (Cpl. Steven Walker & Dep. Nick Carmack with K9 Shep), Richland County (SC) Sheriff's Department (Dep. Jacob Murphy & Sgt. Steven Tapler), Greene County (MO) Sheriff's Office (Cpl. Tim Haynes & Cpl. Jason Flora), Nye County (NV) Sheriff's Office (Dep. Jason Yelle & Dep. James Ramos), Warwick (RI) Police Department (Sgt. John Curley & Ofc. Paul Wells with K9 Fox), Pinal County (AZ) Sheriff's Office (Sheriff Mark Lamb & Dep. Michael Fender), and Gwinnett County (GA) Sheriff's Office (M/D Mike Baker & M/D Lance Laraby)
131	69	"07.20.18"	July 20, 2018	1.992
Guest Analyst: Sheriff Mark Lamb of the Pinal County (AZ) Sheriff's Office; Departments and officers featured include: El Paso (TX) Police Department (Ofc. Andrea Zendejas & Ofc. Dominic Chacon), Pasco County (FL) Sheriff's Office (Dep. Justin Lawless & Dep. Chris Stockton with K9 Jango), Richland County (SC) Sheriff's Department (M/D Chris Blanding & Cpl. Josh Robinson), Greene County (MO) Sheriff's Office (Dep. Morgan Rudderham & Cpl. Jason Flora), Nye County (NV) Sheriff's Office (Lt. Boruchowitz & Det. Alex Cox), Warwick (RI) Police Department (Sgt. Jed Pineau & Ofc. Matt Moretti), Pinal County (AZ) Sheriff's Office (Dep. Catherine Rybka & Dep. Zach Wheeler with K9 Oscar), and Gwinnett County (GA) Sheriff's Office (M/D Mike Baker & M/D Lance Laraby)
132	70	"07.21.18"	July 21, 2018	2.064
Guest Analyst: Sheriff Mark Lamb of the Pinal County (AZ) Sheriff's Office; Departments and officers featured include: El Paso (TX) Police Department (Ofc. Andrea Zendejas & Ofc. Ramiro Garza), Pasco County (FL) Sheriff's Office (Dep. Justin Lawless & Dep. Chris Stockton with K9 Jango), Richland County (SC) Sheriff's Department (Dep. Addy Perez & Cpl. Mark Laureano), Greene County (MO) Sheriff's Office (Cpl. Tim Haynes & Dep. Carl Scharpf), Nye County (NV) Sheriff's Office (Dep. Michael Connelly & Dep. James Ramos), Warwick (RI) Police Department (Sgt. Jed Pineau & Ofc. Paul Wells with K9 Fox), Pinal County (AZ) Sheriff's Office (Dep. Patrick Palomar & Dep. Brandi Jackson), and Gwinnett County (GA) Sheriff's Office (M/D Mike Baker & M/D Lance Laraby)
133	71	"07.27.18"	July 27, 2018	2.028
Departments and officers featured include: El Paso (TX) Police Department (Ofc. Arturo Flores & Ofc. Ramiro Garza), Pasco County (FL) Sheriff's Office (Cpl. Steven Walker & Dep. Nick Carmack with K9 Shep), Richland County (SC) Sheriff's Department (Lt. Danny Brown & Dep. Kenny Fitzsimmons), Greene County (MO) Sheriff's Office (Dep. Tommy Connell & Cpl. Jason Flora), Nye County (NV) Sheriff's Office (Lt. David Boruchowitz & Dep. Michael Mokeski), Warwick (RI) Police Department (Sgt. John Curley & Ofc. Aaron Steere with K9 Viking), Pinal County (AZ) Sheriff's Office (Sheriff Mark Lamb & Dep. Brandi Jackson), and Gwinnett County (GA) Sheriff's Office (M/D Mike Baker & M/D Lance Laraby)
134	72	"07.28.18"	July 28, 2018	2.065
Departments and officers featured include: El Paso (TX) Police Department (Ofc. Andrea Zendejas & Ofc. Jessica Costa), Pasco County (FL) Sheriff's Office (Cpl. Steven Walker & Dep. Nick Carmack with K9 Shep), Richland County (SC) Sheriff's Department (Lt. Danny Brown & Cpl. Kristy Boyles), Greene County (MO) Sheriff's Office (Cpl. Tim Haynes & Dep. Carl Scharpf), Nye County (NV) Sheriff's Office (Det. Alex Cox & Lt. James McRae), Warwick (RI) Police Department (Sgt. John Curley & Ofc. Jill Marshall), Pinal County (AZ) Sheriff's Office (Sheriff Mark Lamb & Dep. Michael Fender), and Gwinnett County (GA) Sheriff's Office (M/D Jason Cotton with K9 Armo & M/D Lance Laraby)
135	73	"08.03.18"	August 3, 2018	1.962
Departments and officers featured include: El Paso (TX) Police Department (Ofc. Andrea Zendejas & Ofc. Ramiro Garza), Pasco County (FL) Sheriff's Office (Dep. Justin Lawless & Dep. Mike Sentner with K9 Yager), Richland County (SC) Sheriff's Department (Lt. Danny Brown & M/D Chris Blanding), Greene County (MO) Sheriff's Office (Cpl. Tim Haynes & Dep. Morgan Rudderham), Nye County (NV) Sheriff's Office (Lt. David Boruchowitz & Dep. James Ramos), Warwick (RI) Police Department (Sgt. John Curley & Ofc. Jill Marshall), Pinal County (AZ) Sheriff's Office (Dep. Brandi Jackson & Dep. Zach Wheeler with K9 Oscar), and Gwinnett County (GA) Sheriff's Office (M/D Mike Baker & M/D Lance Laraby)
136	74	"08.04.18"	August 4, 2018	2.002
Departments and officers featured include: El Paso (TX) Police Department (Ofc. Andrea Zendejas & Ofc. Jessica Costa), Pasco County (FL) Sheriff's Office (Dep. Justin Lawless & Dep. Mike Sentner with K9 Yager), Richland County (SC) Sheriff's Department (Cpl. Josh Robinson & Cpl. Mark Laureano), Greene County (MO) Sheriff's Office (Cpl. James Craigmyle with K9 Lor & Dep. Carl Scharpf), Nye County (NV) Sheriff's Office (Dep. Josh Bissell & Dep. James Ramos), Warwick (RI) Police Department (Ofc. Tim Lipka & Ofc. Aaron Steere with K9 Viking), Pinal County (AZ) Sheriff's Office (Dep. Brandi Jackson & Dep. Zach Wheeler with K9 Oscar), and Gwinnett County (GA) Sheriff's Office (M/D Mike Baker & M/D Lance Laraby)
137	75	"08.10.18"	August 10, 2018	2.041
Guest Analysts: Cpl. James Craigmyle and K9 Lor of the Greene County (MO) Sheriff's Office; Departments and officers featured include: El Paso (TX) Police Department (Ofc. Andrea Zendejas & Ofc. Ramiro Garza), Pasco County (FL) Sheriff's Office (Dep. Alex Mason & Dep. Mike Reckmeyer), Richland County (SC) Sheriff's Department (Dep. Donnyray Campbell & Cpl. Kristy Boyles), Greene County (MO) Sheriff's Office (Dep. Morgan Rudderham & Dep. Kyle Winchell), Nye County (NV) Sheriff's Office (Lt. James McRae & Sgt. Corey Fowles), Warwick (RI) Police Department (Sgt. John Curley & Ofc. Matt Moretti), Mission (TX) Police Department (Ofc. Juan Mercado & Ofc. John Oliva), and Gwinnett County (GA) Sheriff's Office (M/D Mike Baker & M/D Lance Laraby)
138	76	"08.11.18"	August 11, 2018	2.015
Guest Analysts: Cpl. James Craigmyle and K9 Lor of the Greene County (MO) Sheriff's Office; Departments and officers featured include: El Paso (TX) Police Department (Ofc. Andrea Zendejas & Ofc. Jessica Costa), Pasco County (FL) Sheriff's Office (Cpl. Steven Walker & Dep. Mark Pini with K9 Yogi), Richland County (SC) Sheriff's Department (S/D Garo Brown & Cpl. David Fairbanks), Greene County (MO) Sheriff's Office (Cpl. Tim Haynes & Dep. Carl Scharpf), Nye County (NV) Sheriff's Office (Sgt. Corey Fowles & Dep. Josh Bissell), Warwick (RI) Police Department (Sgt. Jed Pineau & Ofc. Paul Wells with K9 Fox), Mission (TX) Police Department (Ofc. Juan Mercado & Ofc. John Oliva), and Gwinnett County (GA) Sheriff's Office (M/D Mike Baker & M/D Lance Laraby)
139	77	"08.16.18 (8PM - 10PM EDT) & (10:56PM - 12AM EDT)"	August 16, 2018	1.550
Departments and officers featured include: El Paso (TX) Police Department (Ofc. Andrea Zendejas & Ofc. Jessica Costa), Pasco County (FL) Sheriff's Office (Cpl. Steven Walker & Dep. Nick Carmack with K9 Shep), Richland County (SC) Sheriff's Department (Lt. Danny Brown & M/D Chris Blanding), Greene County (MO) Sheriff's Office (Cpl. Tim Haynes & Cpl. Jason Flora), Nye County (NV) Sheriff's Office (Dep. Jason Yelle & Dep. Bryan Cooper), Warwick (RI) Police Department (Ofc. Mark Jandreau & Ofc. Paul Wells with K9 Fox), Mission (TX) Police Department (Ofc. Juan Mercado & Ofc. John Oliva), and Gwinnett County (GA) Sheriff's Office (M/D Mike Baker & M/D Lance Laraby)
140	78	"08.17.18"	August 17, 2018	1.842
Departments and officers featured include: El Paso (TX) Police Department (Ofc. Andrea Zendejas & Ofc. Dominic Chacon), Pasco County (FL) Sheriff's Office (Dep. Michael Sudler & Cpl. Mike Barrow), Richland County (SC) Sheriff's Department (Sgt. James Abraham with K9 Denzel & Dep. Kenneth Fitzsimmons), Greene County (MO) Sheriff's Office (Dep. Kyle Winchell & Cpl. Jason Flora), Nye County (NV) Sheriff's Office (Lt. David Boruchowitz & Sgt. Corey Fowles), Warwick (RI) Police Department (Sgt. John Curley & Sgt. Jed Pineau), Mission (TX) Police Department (Ofc. Juan Mercado & Ofc. John Oliva), and Gwinnett County (GA) Sheriff's Office (M/D Mike Baker & M/D Lance Laraby)
141	79	"08.18.18"	August 18, 2018	2.035
Departments and officers featured include: El Paso (TX) Police Department (Ofc. Arturo Flores & Ofc. Ramiro Garza), Pasco County (FL) Sheriff's Office (Dep. Justin Lawless & Cpl. Chris Bukowiecki), Richland County (SC) Sheriff's Department (M/D Chris Blanding & Cpl. Mark Laureano), Greene County (MO) Sheriff's Office (Dep. Tommy Connell & Dep. Carl Scharpf), Nye County (NV) Sheriff's Office (Sgt. Corey Fowles & Dep. Jason Yelle), Warwick (RI) Police Department (Sgt. John Curley & Ofc. Aaron Steere with K9 Viking), Mission (TX) Police Department (Ofc. Juan Mercado & Ofc. John Oliva), and Gwinnett County (GA) Sheriff's Office (M/D Mike Baker & M/D Lance Laraby)
142	80	"08.24.18"	August 24, 2018	2.054
Departments and officers featured include: El Paso (TX) Police Department (Ofc. Jessica Costa & Ofc. Dominic Chacon), Pasco County (FL) Sheriff's Office (Dep. Alex Mason & Dep. Nick Carmack with K9 Shep), Greene County (MO) Sheriff's Office (Cpl. James Craigmyle & K9 Lor & Dep. Morgan Rudderham), Nye County (NV) Sheriff's Office (Det. Alex Cox & Dep. Jason Yelle), Warwick (RI) Police Department (Sgt. John Curley & Sgt. Jed Pineau), Mission (TX) Police Department (Ofc. Juan Mercado & Ofc. John Oliva), and Gwinnett County (GA) Sheriff's Office (M/D Mike Baker & M/D Lance Laraby)
143	81	"08.25.18"	August 25, 2018	2.076
Departments and officers featured include: El Paso (TX) Police Department (Ofc. Andrea Zendejas & Ofc. Ramiro Garza), Pasco County (FL) Sheriff's Office (Dep. Alex Mason & Dep. Nick Carmack with K9 Shep), Greene County (MO) Sheriff's Office (Cpl. James Craigmyle & K9 Lor, Cpl. Tim Haynes, Cpl. Jason Flora, & Dep. Carl Scharpf), Nye County (NV) Sheriff's Office (Dep. Josh Bissell & Dep. Bryan Cooper), Warwick (RI) Police Department (Ofc. Matt Moretti & Ofc. Aaron Steere with K9 Viking), Mission (TX) Police Department (Ofc. Juan Mercado & Ofc. John Oliva), and Gwinnett County (GA) Sheriff's Office (M/D Mike Baker & M/D Lance Laraby)
