= St. Tammany Parish Sheriff's Office =

Coordinates: 30°28′48.90″N 90°5′46.31″W

- Abbreviation: STPSO

Agency overview
- Formed: 1812

Jurisdictional structure
- Operations jurisdiction: St. Tammany, Louisiana, US
- Map of St. Tammany Parish Sheriff's Office's jurisdiction
- Area: 1,124 square miles (2,910 km^{2})
- Population: 233,740
- General nature: Local civilian police

Operational structure
- Headquarters: Slidell, Louisiana
- Agency executive: Randy Smith, Sheriff

Website
- http://www.stpso.com/

The St. Tammany Parish Sheriff's Office (STPSO) is the chief law enforcement agency of St. Tammany Parish, Louisiana. It falls under the authority of the Sheriff, an elected official who is the chief law enforcement officer of the parish.

== The Sheriff ==
The sheriff of St. Tammany Parish is Randy Smith, Sheriff Smith was sworn in as Sheriff of St. Tammany Parish on July 1, 2016. He has over 28 years of experience in the field of law enforcement. He previously served as chief of police for Slidell, Louisiana.

Employees of the office are amongst the highest-paid in the region.

== Facilities ==
The Sheriff's Office operates the following facilities:

- Headquarters - The headquarters is located within the St. Tammany Parish Justice Center, at 701 North Columbia Street, in Covington.
- St. Tammany Parish Jail - The St. Tammany Parish Jail is located at 1200 Champagne Street in Covington. Opened in 1985, the jail currently houses 872 inmates, and employs 207 people at full operation. The jail is operating under a Memorandum of Agreement with the US Dept of Justice.
- Administration Building - Many of the agency's administrative divisions operate out of the complex at 300 Brownswitch Road, Slidell.
- Training Center - The agency's training and education center is located on Pine Street in Pearl River.

== Fallen officers ==
Since the formation of the St. Tammany Parish Sheriff's Office, four deputies have been killed in the line of duty. The most common cause of line of duty deaths to date is gunfire.

Officer	Date of death	Details
Sergeant Louis Henry Wagner, II	Saturday, June 3, 1978	Gunfire
Sergeant John William Bonnell, III	Tuesday, July 10, 1979	Gunfire
Deputy First Class Hilery A. Mayo, Jr.	Saturday, June 9, 2007	Automobile accident
Sergeant Linden "Beau" Raimer	Wednesday, June 13, 2007	Weather/Natural disaster

== Corruption and Sexual Abuse Allegations ==
In 2019, former Sheriff Jack Strain was investigated by the FBI for bribery and sexual abuse of minors both before and while in office. Strain was arrested on June 11, 2019 for the allegations. He was found guilty on all charges of sexual crime on November 8, 2021. Strain was sentenced to four consecutive life sentences without the opportunity of parole. He is serving his time at the state prison in Homer, Louisiana.

In 2018, local law enforcement arrested, strip-searched and jailed a local man, Jerry Rogers Jr. Rogers had criticized the fruitless police investigation of a murder in an email. The Sheriff's Office charged Rogers under a state defamation law that the district attorney's office pointed out was long before ruled unconstitutional. The matter is the subject of a lawsuit.

== See also ==
- List of law enforcement agencies in Louisiana
