= Calvert County Sheriff's Office =

Primary law enforcement agency in Calvert County, Maryland, US

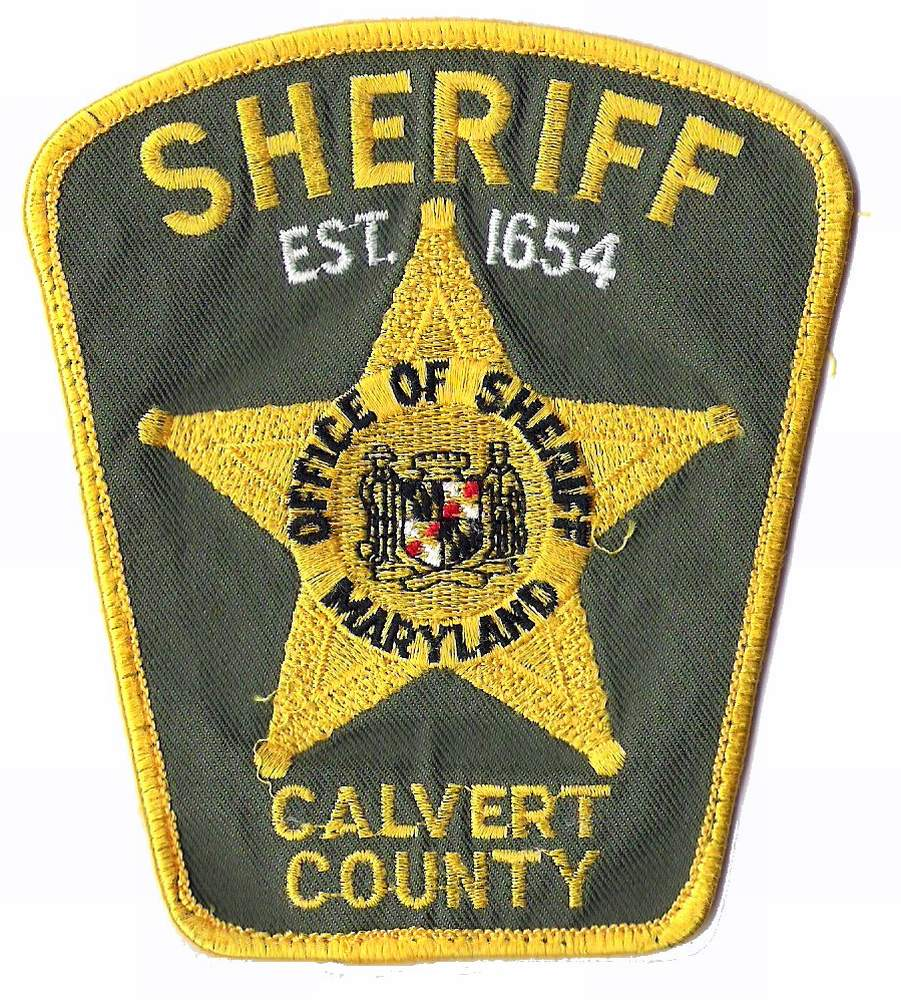
- Patch of the Calvert County Sheriff's Office
- Abbreviation: CCSO

Agency overview
- Formed: 1654; 372 years ago

Jurisdictional structure
- Operations jurisdiction: Calvert County, Maryland, US
- Map of Calvert County Sheriff's Office's jurisdiction
- Area: 213 square miles (550 km^{2})
- Population: 88,737 (2010)
- General nature: Local civilian police

Operational structure
- Headquarters: Prince Frederick, Maryland
- Agency executive: Ricky Cox, Sheriff

Website
- Calvert County Sheriff's Office

The Calvert County Sheriff's Office (CCSO) is the primary law enforcement agency servicing over 87,000 residents and 213 square miles (550 km^{2}) in Calvert County, Maryland.

== History ==
The CCSO was founded in 1654.

In 2001, Sheriff Vonzell R. Ward resigned while under investigation for misconduct. That same year, the county explored the idea of creating a county police department to take over law enforcement duties from the sheriff's department, mentioning Ward and the previous sheriff Adrian Joy, described as "an absentee sheriff, his love for fishing was so strong."

In 2004, the Special Operations Division became only the second local law enforcement agency to be trained by the elite Navy Seals in Special Waterborne Operations. Given the presence of two major facilities along the shores of the Chesapeake Bay (Calvert Cliffs Nuclear Power Plant and the Cove Point liquified natural gas facility) the sheriff's office has a unique need for maritime law enforcement skills. In 2008, the Special Operations team took part in the seizing of a cargo ship in the Chesapeake Bay that was involved in a bizarre incident of drunk sailors violating several Coast Guard regulations.

In 2014, Sheriff Mike Evans appeared in a music video for a local female singer: the video was criticized as sexist and a waste of county funds.

In 2022, the ACLU sued the CCSO after the office charged them $12,000 to receive police records related to searches of Black residents, stating that the charge was "burdensome".

== Organization ==
The current Sheriff is Ricky Cox, a 19-year veteran of law enforcement.

The Sheriff's office has several divisions:

Administrative & Judicial Services -Consists of the Civil Process Unit, Courthouse Security Unit, Accreditation, and the Southern Maryland Criminal Justice Academy.

Criminal Investigations consists of the Calvert Investigative Team, Warrant Unit, Crime Scene Unit, and the Evidence/Property Unit.

Patrol consists of the K-9 Unit, Community Action Team, Motorcycle Unit and Twin Beaches Patrol.

Special Operations & Homeland Security -Consists of the Special Operations Team and the Homeland Security function.

Detention Center -The Detention Center is responsible for detaining pre-trial suspected offenders to adequately assure their appearance at trial or other judicial proceedings and to hold those offenders serving short-term sentences until legally released

== Authority ==
All CCSO deputies' authority is constitutional in origin and are sworn law enforcement officers with full arrest authority as governed under the Maryland Police and Correctional Training Commission.

== See also ==
- List of law enforcement agencies in Maryland
