= List of Maryland fire departments =

Fire departments in the U.S. state of Maryland function in the principal cities, towns and communities in each county.

== Allegany County ==
Fire Department	Town/City	Station Number
Cumberland Fire Department	Cumberland	Station 1
La Vale Volunteer Fire Department	La Vale	Station 2
Bedford Road Volunteer Fire Department	Cumberland	Station 3
Baltimore Pike Volunteer Fire Department	Pleasant Grove	Station 4
Corriganville Volunteer Fire Department	Corriganville	Station 5
Ellerslie Volunteer Fire Department	Ellerslie	Station 6
District 16 Volunteer Fire Department & Ambulance Service	Mexico Farms	Station 7
Bowling Green Volunteer Fire Department	Bowling Green	Station 8
Cresaptown Volunteer Fire Department	Cresaptown	Station 9
Bowmans Addition Volunteer Fire Department	Bowmans Addition	Station 11
Flintstone Volunteer Fire Department	Flintstone	Station 12
Oldtown Volunteer Fire Department	Oldtown	Station 13
Mt. Savage Volunteer Fire Department	Mt. Savage	Station 15
Frostburg Fire Department	Frostburg	Station 16
Shaft Volunteer Fire Department	Borden Shaft	Station 17
Midland Volunteer Fire Department	Midland	Station 18
Barton Volunteer Fire Department	Barton	Station 19
Good Will Volunteer Fire Department	Lonaconing	Station 20
Potomac Volunteer Fire Department	Westernport	Station 22
Bloomington Volunteer Fire Department	Bloomington	Station 36
New Creek Volunteer Fire Department	New Creek	Station 38
Little Orleans Volunteer Fire Department	Little Orleans	Station 43
Rawlings Volunteer Fire Department	Rawlings	Station 47
Tri-Town EMS	Westernport	Station 50
La Vale Rescue Squad	La Vale	Station 52
Frostburg Emergency Medical Services	Frostburg	Station 51
George's Creek Rescue Squad	George's Creek	Station 55

- The borough of Wellersburg is in Somerset County, Pennsylvania where The Wellersburg District Volunteer Fire Company provides coverage as Station 630, but does provide primary fire protection and first responder service to portions of Allegany County as Station 630.
- The CDP of Bloomington is in Garrett County, Maryland where it provides coverage as Station 100, but does provide primary fire protection to portions of Allegany County as Station 36.
- The community of New Creek is in Mineral County, West Virginia, but does provide primary fire protection to portions of Allegany County, serving both counties as Station 38.

== Anne Arundel County ==
All volunteer stations in Anne Arundel County have at least 4 career firefighter on staff 24x7, with the exception of Ferndale.

Fire Department	Battalion	Equipment	Town/City	Station Number
Galesville Volunteer Fire Company (Career)	3	Engine 11, Tanker 1, Rescue Squad 1, Brush 1, Utility 1, Medic 1, EMS-3	Galesville	Station 1
Edgewater Volunteer Fire Department (Career/Volunteer)^{[A]}	3	Engine 21, Engine 22, Rescue Squad 2, Brush 2, Utility 2, Ambulance 29, Medic 2, Fireboat 2, Chief 2	Woodland Beach	Station 2
Arundel Volunteer Fire Department - Riva Station (Career/Volunteer)^{[B]}	3	Rescue Engine 3, Engine 32, Tanker 3, Brush 3, Utility 3, Medic 3, Battalion Chief 3	Riva	Station 3
Severn Fire Station (Career - Special Operations)	1	Rescue Engine 4, Rescue Squad 4, Utility 4, Medic 4, Quality Improvement (QI) 4, Mobile Command & Communications Unit (MCCU) 1, HazMat 4, Technical Rescue (TR) 4, Collapse (CLPS) 4, Confined Space (CSPC) 4, Trench Rescue (TRCH) 4, Boat 4, Swift Water Team (SWT) 4	Severn	Station 4
Waugh Chapel Fire Station (Career)	4	Engine 51, Tower 5, Medic 5, Battalion Chief 4	Gambrills	Station 5
Herald Harbor Volunteer Fire Department (Career/Volunteer)	4	Engine 61, Tanker 6, Brush 6, Utility 6, Special Unit 6, Ambulance 69, Medic 6, Chief 6	Herald Harbor	Station 6
Arundel Volunteer Fire Department (Career/Volunteer)	4	Engine 71, Engine 73, Rescue Squad 7, Brush 7, Utility 7, Ambulance 79, Chief 7, Assistant Chief 7	Gambrills	Station 7
Annapolis Neck Fire Station (Career)	3	Engine 84, Medic 48, Dive Unit 8, Special Unit 8	Annapolis	Station 8
Harwood/Lothian Fire Station (Career)	3	Engine 91, Brush 9, Utility 9, Medic 9, Tanker 9	Lothian	Station 9
Jacobsville Fire Station (Career)	2	Engine 101, Medic 10	Pasadena	Station 10
Orchard Beach Volunteer Fire Department (Career/Volunteer)	2	Engine 113, Engine 114, Rescue Squad 11, Brush 11, Utility 11, Ambulance 119, Medic 11, Chief 11, Assistant Chief 11	Orchard Beach	Station 11
Earleigh Heights Volunteer Fire Company(Career/Volunteer)	2	Engine 121, Engine 122, Rescue Squad 12, Special Unit 12, Utility 12, Ambulance 129, Medic 12, Chief 12	Severna Park	Station 12
Riviera Beach Volunteer Fire Company(Career/Volunteer)	2	Engine 131, Truck 13, Brush 13, Utility 13, FireBoat 13, Ambulance 139, Medic 13, Chief 13, Asst Chief 13	Riviera Beach	Station 13
Arnold Volunteer Fire Department (Career/Volunteer)	2	Engine 171, Engine 172, Brush 17, Utility 17, Medic 17, Chief 17, Assistant Chief 17	Arnold	Station 17
Marley Fire Station (Career)	1	Engine 181, Brush 18, Medic 18, Medic 18B,	Glen Burnie	Station 18
Cape St. Claire Volunteer Fire Company (Career/Volunteer)	2	Engine 191, Engine 194, Brush 19, Utility 19, Ambulance 199, FireBoat 19, Chief 19	Cape St. Claire	Station 19
Lake Shore Volunteer Fire Company (Career/Volunteer)	2	Engine 201, Engine 204, Rescue Engine 20, Brush 20, Utility 20, Ambulance 209, Admin 20, Chief 20	Lake Shore	Station 20
Harmans/Dorsey Fire Station (Career)	1	Engine 211, Medic 21, Ambulance 219, Mini-Pumper 21, EMS-1	Hanover	Station 21
Jones Station Fire Station (Career - Special Operations)	2	Rescue Engine 23, Truck 23, Medic 23, Special Unit 23, HazMat 23, Technical Rescue (TR) 23, Collapse (CLPS) 23, Confined Space (CSPC) 23, Trench Rescue (TRCH) 23, Boat 23, Swift Water Team (SWT) 23	Severna Park	Station 23
South Glen Burnie Fire Station (Career)	1	Engine 261, Tower Ladder 26, Medic 26	Glen Burnie	Station 26
Maryland City Volunteer Fire Department(Career/Volunteer)	4	Rescue Engine 27, Engine 272, Brush 27, Utility 27, Ambulance 279, Medic 27, Chief 27	Maryland City	Station 27
Odenton Volunteer Fire Company (Volunteer/Career)	4	Rescue Engine 28, Engine 282, Truck 28, Brush 28, Utility 28, Ambulance 289, Chief 28, Assistant Chief 28	Odenton	Station 28
Jessup Volunteer Fire Department (Career/Volunteer)	4	Engine 291, Truck 29, Utility 29, Medic 29	Jessup	Station 29
Armiger Fire Station (Career)	2	Engine 301, Tower 30, Medic 30, BC-2, EMS-2	Pasadena	Station 30
Brooklyn Volunteer Fire Company (Career)	1	Engine 311, Truck 31, Medic 31	Brooklyn Park	Station 31
Linthicum Volunteer Fire Company (Career/Volunteer)	1	Engine 321, Medic 32, Medical Ambulance Bus (MAB) 32	Linthicum	Station 32
Glen Burnie Volunteer Fire Department (Career/Volunteer)	1	Engine 331, Engine 332, Rescue Squad 33, Utility 33, Ambulance 339, Medic 33, Medic 33B, Chief 33, Battalion Chief 1	Glen Burnie	Station 33
Ferndale Volunteer Fire Company (Volunteer)	1	Engine 342, Engine 343, Rescue Squad 34, Brush 34, Utility 34, Ambulance 349, Chief 34	Ferndale	Station 34
Forest Drive Fire Station (Career)	35	Engine 351, Engine 352, Medic 35, Special Unit 35, Utility 35, Emergency Services Unit (ESU) 35, Special Operations Chief 35, Battalion Chief 35, EMS 35	Annapolis	Station 35
Eastport Fire Station (Career)	35	Engine 361, Engine 362, Truck 36, Medic 36, Medic 36B, EMS 36, EMS 36B, FireBoat 36, All Terrain Vehicle (ATV) 36, Utility Terrain Vehicle (UTV) 36, Bike Medic 36	Annapolis	Station 36
Taylor Avenue Fire Station (Career)	35	Engine 381, Rescue Squad 38, Truck 39, Medic 39, Special Unit 38, HazMat 39, Technical Rescue (TR) 39, Collapse (CLPS) 39, Confined Space (CSPC) 39, Trench Rescue (TRCH) 39, Boat 39, Swift Water Team (SWT) 39	Annapolis	Station 38
West Annapolis Volunteer Fire Department (Career)	3	Engine 401, Engine 402, Truck 40, Brush 40, Utility 40, Tanker 40, Ambulance 409, Medic 40, Chief 40	Annapolis	Station 40
Avalon Shores Volunteer Fire Company (Career)	3	Engine 411, Brush 41, Utility 41, Medic 41, FireBoat 41	Shady Side	Station 41
Deale Volunteer Fire Department (Career/Volunteer)	3	Engine 421, Engine 422, Truck 42, Brush 42, Utility 42, Ambulance 429, Medic 42, Boat 42, Chief 42, Tanker 42	Deale	Station 42
BWI Fire Rescue Services (Career)	43	Engine 431, Quint 43, Tower 43, Rescue Squad 43, Special Operations 43, Tanker 43, Brush 43, Utility 43, Paramedic 43, Paramedic 44, HazMat 43, Crash 431, Crash 432, Crash 434, Crash 435, Crash 436, Deputy Chief 1, Deputy Chief 2, Deputy Chief 3, Division Chief 43, Shift Commander 43, HazMat 43, Mass Casualty Trailer	BWI Airport	Station 43
Fort Meade Fire Department (Career - Federal)	45	Engine 451, Engine 452, Engine 453, Engine 455, Truck 45, HazMat 45, Brush 45, Paramedic 45, Paramedic 45B, Reserve Paramedic 45, Special Unit 45, Decon 45, EMS 45, Chief 45, Division Chief 45, Utility 45	Fort George G. Meade	Station 45
Naval District Washington Fire Department (Career - Federal)	46	Quint 46, Paramedic 46, Battalion Chief 46, Special Events 46, ATV 46, ATV 46-2	US Naval Academy	Station 46
Naval District Washington Fire Department (Career - Federal)	46	Rescue Engine 47, Engine 461, Medic 47, Special Unit 47, UTV 47	Naval Support Activity - Annapolis	Station 47
US Coast Guard Fire Department-Baltimore (Military)		Engine 22, Squad 2, Utility 2, ASAP 1	Curtis Bay	

- A The Edgewater Volunteer Fire Department was known as the Woodland Beach Volunteer Fire Department from its founding until October 2, 2024 when a rebranding was announced.
- B The Arundel Volunteer Fire Department merged with the Riva Volunteer Fire Department on June 12, 2024 with the Arundel VFD taking over the Riva corporation. Prior to this date, the Riva Volunteer Fire Department had been Station 3.

== Baltimore County ==
Stations 1-19, 54-58, and 60 are fully staffed by career members of the Baltimore County Fire Department. Stations 20-51, 53, 74, 85, and 156 are independent companies staffed solely by volunteers. Station 175 is staffed by the Maryland Air National Guard.

Fire Department	Battalion	Equipment	Town/City	Station Number
Towson Fire Station	1	Engine 1, Engine 101, Truck 1, Medic 1, Medic 101, Brush 1, Bariatric 1, Division Chiefs (1/2/3/4)	Towson	Station 1
Pikesville Fire Station	2	Engine 2, Medic 2, Medic 102, Brush 2	Pikesville	Station 2
Woodlawn Fire Station	2	Engine 3, Medic 3, Medic 103, Brush 3, EMS 8	Woodlawn	Station 3
Catonsville Fire Station	2	Engine 4, Engine 41, Medic 4, Brush 4	Catonsville	Station 4
Halethorpe Fire Station	2	Engine 5, Truck 5, Medic 5, Brush 5, EMS 2	Halethorpe	Station 5
Dundalk Fire Station	3	Engine 6, Engine 61, Medic 6, Medic 106, Brush 6	Dundalk	Station 6
Essex Fire Station	3	Engine 7, Engine 71, Medic 7, Medic 107, Brush 7	Essex	Station 7
Fullerton Fire Station	1	Engine 8, Truck 8, Medic 8, Brush 8, EMS 6	Fullerton	Station 8
Edgemere Fire Station	3	Engine 9, Medic 9, Brush 9, Bariatric 9	Edgemere	Station 9
Parkville Fire Station	1	Engine 10, Medic 10, Medic 110, Brush 10	Parkville	Station 10
Hillendale Fire Station	1	Engine 11, Medic 11, Brush 11, ATV 11, EMS 1	Towson	Station 11
Middle River Fire Station	3	Engine 12, Medic 12, Medic 112, Brush 12, EMS 4	Middle River	Station 12
Westview Fire Station	2	Engine 13, Truck 13, HazMat Satellite 13, Medic 13, Medic 113, Brush 13, Battalion Chiefs (21/22/23/24)	Woodlawn	Station 13
Brooklandville Fire Station	1	Engine 14, HazMat 114, Foam 14, Air Unit 14, Medic 14, Brush 14	Lutherville	Station 14
Eastview Fire Station	3	Engine 15, Truck 15, HazMat Satellite 15, Medic 15, Brush 15, EMS 3	Dundalk	Station 15
Golden Ring Fire Station	3	Engine 16, Medic 16, Medic 116, Brush 16, Battalion Chiefs (31/32/33/34)	Rosedale	Station 16
Texas Fire Station	1	Engine 17, Tower 17, USAR 17 (Urban Search and Rescue), Boat 17, Boat 117, Medic 17, Medic 117, Utility 17, Brush 17, EMS 7	Cockeysville	Station 17
Randallstown Fire Station	2	Engine 18, Truck 18, Medic 18, Medic 118, Brush 18	Randallstown	Station 18
Garrison Fire Station	2	Engine 19, Air Unit 19, Medic 19, Brush 19, EMS 5	Owings Mills	Station 19
White Marsh Volunteer Fire Company^{[A]}	3	Engine 201, Engine 202, Medic 203, Brush 204, Utility 205, Utility 206, Rehab 20, Canteen 20	White Marsh	Station 20
Bowleys Quarters Volunteer Fire Department	3	Engine 211, Squad 213, Special Unit 214, Utility 215, Marine Unit 217, Brush 218, Marine Unit 219	Bowleys Quarters	Station 21
North Point-Edgemere Volunteer Fire Company	3	Engine 261, Engine 263, Squad 262, Utility 265, Brush 266, Special Unit 267, Marine Unit 268, Marine Unit 269	Edgemere	Station 26
Wise Avenue Volunteer Fire Department	3	Engine 271, Engine 272, Ambulance 275, Brush 276, Utility 277	Dundalk	Station 27
Rosedale Volunteer Fire Company	3	Engine 281, Engine 282, Medic 285, Special Unit 283, Brush 286	Rosedale	Station 28
Providence Volunteer Fire Company	1	Engine 291, Brush 294, Truck 297, Utility 298, Utility 299	Towson	Station 29
Lutherville Volunteer Fire Company	1	Engine 301, Engine 302, Engine 307, Squad 303, Utility 304, Utility 306	Lutherville	Station 30
Owings Mills Volunteer Fire Company	2	Engine 312, Truck 313, Medic 315, Brush 314, Utility 318, Utility 319	Owings Mills	Station 31
Pikesville Volunteer Fire Department	2	Engine 321, Squad 322, Tower 323, Medic 325, Utility 329	Pikesville	Station 32
Woodlawn Volunteer Fire Company	2	Engine 331, Medic 335, Utility 333	Woodlawn	Station 33
Arbutus Volunteer Fire Department	2	Engine 351, Engine 352, Squad 354, Medic 355, Medic 356, Utility 357, Swiftwater 358, ATV 35	Arbutus	Station 35
Lansdowne Volunteer Fire Department^{[B]}	2	Engine 361, Engine 362, Medic 365, Special Unit 342, Utility 368, Utility 369	Lansdowne	Station 36
English Consul Volunteer Fire Company	2	Engine 371, Engine 372, Medic 375, Brush 377, Utility 374, Utility 378, Bus 37	Baltimore Highlands	Station 37
Long Green Volunteer Fire Company	1	Engine 381, Engine 382, Brush 384, Special Unit 386, Utility 387	Glen Arm	Station 38
Cockeysville Volunteer Fire Company	1	Engine 391, Engine 392, Special Unit 393, Tanker Support 394, Medic 395, Utility 397	Cockeysville	Station 39
Glyndon Volunteer Fire Department	2	Engine 401, Truck 404, Ambulance 405, Special Unit 407, Utility 408	Glyndon	Station 40
Reisterstown Volunteer Fire Company	2	Engine 412, Engine 413, Squad 414, Medic 415, Special Unit 418, Utility 419	Reisterstown	Station 41
Hereford Volunteer Fire Company	1	Engine 441, Squad 442, Brush 443, Tanker Support 444, Tanker 446, Special Unit 448, ATV 44	Hereford	Station 44
Maryland Line Volunteer Fire Company	1	Engine 451, Engine 452, Brush 453, Tanker 454, Ambulance 455, Utility 457	Maryland Line	Station 45
Liberty Road Volunteer Fire Company	2	Engine 461, Engine 464, Medic 465, Special Unit 468, Brush 462, Utility 463	Randallstown	Station 46
Jacksonville Volunteer Fire Company	1	Engine 471, Engine 473, Brush 472, Medic 475, Special Unit 476, Utility 477, ATV 47	Jacksonville	Station 47
Kingsville Volunteer Fire Company	3	Engine 481, Squad 483, Tanker 488, Medic 485, Special Unit 486, Swiftwater 489, ATV 48	Kingsville	Station 48
Butler Volunteer Fire Company	1	Engine 494, Tanker Support 491, Brush 492, Utility 497	Butler	Station 49
Chestnut Ridge Volunteer Fire Company	1	Engine 501, Engine-Tanker 503, Medic 505, Brush 506, Tanker Support 504, Utility 502, Utility 507, ATV 50, SORT 50 (Special Operations Response Team)	Owings Mills	Station 50
Essex Volunteer Fire Company^{[C]}	3	Engine 511, Engine 512, Brush 514, Ambulance 515, Special Unit 513, Utility 516	Essex	Station 51
Hereford Volunteer Ambulance Association	1	Medic 535, Utility 532, ATV 53	Hereford	Station 53
Chase Fire Station	3	Engine 54, Decon 54, Medic 54, Brush 54	Chase	Station 54
Perry Hall Fire Station	1	Engine 55, Medic 55, Brush 55	Perry Hall	Station 55
Franklin Fire Station	2	Engine 56, Medic 56, Brush 56	Reisterstown	Station 56
Sparrows Point Fire Station^{[D]}	3	Engine 57, Air Unit 57, Brush 57	Sparrows Point	Station 57
Back River Neck Fire Station	3	Medic 58	Essex	Station 58
Parkton Fire Station	1	Engine 60, Medic 60, Brush 60	Parkton	Station 60
Middle River Volunteer Fire & Rescue Company^{[E]}	3	Truck 741, Engine 742, Squad 743, Engine 744, Medic 745, Medic 746, Utility 747, Dive Unit 748, Utility 749, Special Unit 74	Middle River	Station 74
Upperco Volunteer Fire Company^{[F]}	2	Engine 851, Engine 852, Medic 855, Brush 858, Utility 857, Utility 859, ATV 85	Upperco	Station 85
Box 234 Association	2	Canteen 156, Rehab 157	Pikesville	Rehab 156
Maryland Air National Guard Fire Station (175th Wing Fire Department)	3	Rescue 3, RIV 4, Tanker 5, Engine 7, Engine 7-2, Crash 8, RIV 9	Martin State Airport	Station 175

- A Central Alarmers (Rehab 155) was absorbed by the White Marsh Volunteer Fire Company in 2015.
- B Violetville Volunteer Fire Company (Station 34) was absorbed by Lansdowne Volunteer Fire Department (Station 36) on February 1, 2017.
- C Middleborough Volunteer Fire Company (Station 23), Rockaway Beach Volunteer Fire Company (Station 24), and Hyde Park Volunteer Fire Company (Station 25) merged on November 21, 2017 forming the Essex Volunteer Fire Company (Station 51).
- D Sparrows Point Fire Department (Station 51) was a fire station operated at the former site of the Bethlehem Steel mill. Station 51 was disbanded with the closing of the mill and the fire station became a part of Baltimore County Fire Department as Station 57. The Baltimore County Fire-Rescue Academy is adjacent to the station.
- E Middle River Volunteer Fire Company (Station 22) and Middle River Volunteer Ambulance Rescue Company (Station 52) merged on August 31, 2016, forming the Middle River Volunteer Fire & Rescue Company (Station 74).
- F Boring Volunteer Fire Company (Station 42) and Arcadia Volunteer Fire Company (Station 43) merged on September 1, 2017, forming the Upperco Volunteer Fire Company (Station 85).

== Baltimore City ==
Baltimore City Fire Department

== Calvert County ==
Fire Department	Equipment	Town/City	Station Number
North Beach Volunteer Fire Department	Ambulance 18, Ambulance 19, Engine 11, Engine 12, Rescue Squad 1, Tower 1	North Beach	Company 1
Prince Frederick Volunteer Fire Department	Engine 21, Engine 22, Rescue Squad 2, Tanker 2, Tower 2	Prince Frederick	Company 2
Solomons Volunteer Rescue Squad & Fire Department	Ambulance 37, Ambulance 38, Ambulance 39, Rescue Engine 3, Engine 31, Engine 33, Engine 34, Truck 3, EMS 3	Solomons	Company 3
Prince Frederick Volunteer Rescue Squad	Ambulance 47, Ambulance 48, Ambulance 49	Prince Frederick	Company 4
Dunkirk Volunteer Fire Department	Ambulance 58, Ambulance 59, Engine 51, Engine 52, Rescue Squad 5, Truck 5, Tanker 5, Chief 5, Deputy Chief 5	Dunkirk	Company 5
Huntingtown Volunteer Fire Department & Rescue Squad	Ambulance 68, Engine 61, Engine 62, Rescue Squad 6, Tanker 6	Huntingtown	Company 6
Saint Leonard Volunteer Fire Department & Rescue Squad	Ambulance 77, Ambulance 78, Ambulance 79, Engine 71, Engine 72, Brush 7, Jeep 7, Rescue Squad 7, Tanker 7, Mass Casualty 7	Saint Leonard	Company 7
Calvert Advanced Life Support	Medic 101, Medic 102, Medic 103, Medic 104, Medic 105 (ALS chase cars)	Prince Frederick	Company 10
Calvert County Dive Team	Boat 12 Utility 12	Prince Frederick	Company 12
Calvert Cliffs Nuclear Power Plant	Engine 171, Engine 175	Calvert Cliffs Nuclear Power Plant	Company 17

== Caroline County ==
Fire Department	Town/City	Station Number
Marydel Volunteer Fire Company, Inc.	Marydel	Station 56
Federalsburg Volunteer Fire Company, Inc.	Federalsburg	Station 100
Preston Volunteer Fire Company, Inc.	Preston	Station 200
Denton Volunteer Fire Company, Inc.	Denton	Station 300
Ridgely Volunteer Fire Company, Inc.	Ridgely	Station 400
Greensboro Volunteer Fire Company, Inc.	Greensboro	Station 600
Goldsboro Volunteer Fire Company, Inc.	Goldsboro	Station 700

- The town of Marydel is in Caroline County, Maryland but the fire company is physically located across the state line in Kent County, Delaware, where it also provides coverage, causing the discrepancy in the numbering system.
- A portion of the county is covered by Queen Anne-Hillsboro Volunteer Fire Co. from Queen Anne's County. The town of Hillsboro is in Caroline County, while the town of Queen Anne lies in both Queen Anne's and Talbot Counties.

== Carroll County ==
Fire Department	Equipment	Town/City	
Mount Airy Volunteer Fire Company	Engine 12, Rescue 1, Tanker 1, Truck 1, Brush 15, Ambulance 18, Ambulance 19, Utility 1, Utility 1-1, Medic 1	Mount Airy	Station 1
Hampstead Volunteer Fire Company	Engine 21, Engine-Tanker 24, Truck 2, Brush 25, Ambulance 28, Ambulance 29, Utility 2, Utility 2-1, Duty 2	Hampstead	Station 2
Westminster Fire Engine & Hose Company	Engine 31, Engine 32, Engine 33, Tower 3, Ambulance 37, Ambulance 38, Ambulance 39, Brush 35, Utility 3, Duty 3	Westminster	Station 3
Manchester Volunteer Fire Department	Engine 43, Engine-Tanker 44, Rescue Squad 4, Ambulance 48, Ambulance 49, Brush 46, Utility 4, ATV 4, Duty 4	Manchester	Station 4
Taneytown Volunteer Fire Company	Engine 52, Engine-Tanker 54, Ladder 5, Rescue 5, Ambulance 58, Ambulance 59, Brush 55, Utility 5	Taneytown	Station 5
Pleasant Valley Community Fire Company	Engine 61, Engine 63, Rescue Squad 6, Tanker 6, Ambulance 69, Special Unit 6, Brush 65, Utility 6, Life Support 6, ATR 30, ATR Trailer 30	Westminster	Station 6
Lineboro Volunteer Fire Department	Engine 72, Engine-Tanker 73, Tanker 7, Ambulance 79, Brush 76, Life Support 7	Lineboro	Station 7
Union Bridge Volunteer Fire Company	Engine 81, Engine-Tanker 84, Rescue Squad 8, Brush 85, Ambulance 89, Utility 8, Utility 8-1	Union Bridge	Station 8
Reese & Community Volunteer Fire Company	Engine 91, Engine 92, Engine-Tanker 94, Rescue Squad 9, Brush 95, Ambulance 99, Utility 9	Westminster	Station 9
New Windsor Fire & Hose Company	Engine 101, Rescue-Engine 102, Brush 105, Ambulance 109, Utility 10, Utility 10-1, Hazmat 30, Decon 30, Spill Trailer 30	New Windsor	Station 10
Harney Volunteer Fire Company	Engine 111, Engine-Tanker 112, Brush 115, Special Unit 11	Taneytown	Station 11
Sykesville-Freedom District Fire Department	Engine 123, Engine 124, Tower 12, Rescue Squad 12, Brush 125, Ambulance 127, Ambulance 128, Ambulance 129, Utility 12, ATV 12	Sykesville	Station 12
Gamber & Community Volunteer Fire Company	Engine 131, Engine-Tanker 133, Engine 134, Brush 136, Ambulance 139, Dive Unit 13, Boat 13, Boat 13-1, Utility 13, Utility 13-1	Finksburg	Station 13
Winfield & Community Volunteer Fire Department	Engine 141, Engine 142, Tanker 14, Brush 145, Ambulance 149, Utility 14, Utility 14-1	Sykesville	Station 14

== Cecil County ==
Fire Department	Town/City	Engines	Special Services	Tankers	Field Pieces/ Traffic Units	Transport Units	ALS Chase Vehicles	Station Number
Cecilton Volunteer Fire Company, Inc.	Cecilton	Engine 1	Truck 1, Rescue 1, Boat 1	Tanker 1	Brush 1	191 ALS, 192 ALS, 193 ALS	EMS Chief 1	Station 1
Volunteer Fire Company No. 1 of Chesapeake City	Chesapeake City	Engine 2	Boat 2	Tanker 2	Utility 2	291 ALS	EMS Chief 2	Station 2
Volunteer Fire Company No. 1 of Chesapeake City	Chesapeake City	Engine 12	Rescue 12	Tanker 12	Brush 12	292 ALS		Station 12
The William M. Singerly Steam Fire Engine and Hook and Ladder Company #1 of Elkton, MD	Elkton	Engine 3	Tower 3, Boat 3		Traffic 3			Station 3
The William M. Singerly Steam Fire Engine and Hook and Ladder Company #1 of Elkton, MD	Elkton	Engine 13, Engine 312	Rescue 13	Tanker 13	Brush 13, Traffic 13	391 ALS, 392 ALS, 393, ALS, 394 ALS	EMS Assistant 3	Station 13
The William M. Singerly Steam Fire Engine and Hook and Ladder Company #1 of Elkton, MD	Elkton	Engine 14						Station 14
North East Volunteer Fire Company, Inc.	North East	Engine 4	Rescue 4, Ladder 4, Boat 4	Tanker 4	Brush 4, Traffic 4	491 ALS, 492 ALS, 493 ALS	EMS Deputy 4	Station 4
North East Volunteer Fire Company, Inc.	North East	Engine 44			Brush 44			Station 44
Charlestown Volunteer Fire Company, Inc.	Charlestown	Engine 511, Engine 512	Truck 5, Boat 5, Boat 5-1		Brush 5	591 ALS		Station 5
The Community Fire Company of Perryville, Maryland, Inc.	Perryville	Engine 6	Rescue 6, Truck 6	Tanker 6	Brush 6, Traffic 6	691 ALS, 692 ALS		Station 6
The Community Fire Company of Perryville, Maryland, Inc.	Perryville	Engine 16						Station 16
Water Witch Volunteer Fire Company, Inc.	Port Deposit	Engine 7	Rescue Boat 71		Brush 7	791 ALS	EMS Chief 7, EMS Deputy 7	Station 7
Water Witch Volunteer Fire Company, Inc.	Port Deposit		Rescue 72, Truck 72	Tanker 72		792 ALS		Station 72
Water Witch Volunteer Fire Company, Inc.	Port Deposit	Engine 73	Boat 73			793 ALS		Station 73
Community Fire Company of Rising Sun, Inc.	Rising Sun	Engine 812, Engine 813	Rescue 8, Truck 8	Tanker 8	Brush 8, Traffic 8	891 ALS, 892 ALS	EMS Chief 8	Station 8
Community Fire Company of Rising Sun, Inc.	Rising Sun	Engine 18				893 ALS		Station 18
Community Fire Company of Rising Sun, Inc.	Rising Sun	Engine 28				894 ALS		Station 28
Hacks Point Volunteer Fire Company, Inc.	Earleville	Engine 9	Rescue 9, Boat 9	Tanker 9	Brush 9	991 BLS, 992 BLS		Station 9
Department of Veterans Affairs Fire Department	Perry Point	Engine 1111, Engine 1112	Rescue 11, Boat 11			1191 ALS, 1192 ALS		Station 11
Cecil County Department of Emergency Services	Colora	HAZMAT-Engine 10	Hazmat 2, Hazmat 3			101 ALS	Paramedic 1, Paramedic 5, EMS 2 (Shift Lieutenant)	Paramedic Station 1
Cecil County Department of Emergency Services	Elkton		Hazmat 1, Hazmat 4, Gator 10, DES 50				Paramedic 2, Paramedic 6, EMS 1 (Shift Captain)	Paramedic Station 2
Cecil County Department of Emergency Services	Chesapeake City					103 ALS	Paramedic 3, Paramedic 7	Paramedic Station 3

== Charles County ==
Fire Department	Town/City	Engines	Special Services	Tankers	EMS Vehicles	Miscellaneous	Station Number
La Plata Volunteer Fire Department	La Plata, MD	Engine 11, Engine 12, Rescue Engine 13, Engine 14	Truck 1, Collapse 1, Brush 1	Foam Tanker 1	None, Fire only	Command 1, Car 1, Vehicle 1, Utility 1, Admin Car 1	Station 1
Hughesville Volunteer Fire Department	Hughesville, MD	Engine 22, Engine 24	Squad 2, Brush 2	Engine Tanker 2	Ambulance 27, Ambulance 28, Career ALS Staffing	Command 2, Car 2, Utility 2, EMS Utility 2	Station 2
Waldorf Volunteer Fire Department	Waldorf, MD	Engine 31, Engine 32, Engine 33, Engine 34	Tower 3, Squad 3, Brush 3, EMS Division - Mass Casualty 3	None	EMS Division - Ambulance 37, Ambulance 38, Ambulance 39, Ambulance 399, Career ALS Staffing	Command 3, Utility 3, EMS Division - EMS Command 3	Station 3
Najemoy Volunteer Fire Department	Nanjemoy, MD	Rescue Engine 41, Engine 42, Engine 44	Fire Boat 4, Brush 4	Tanker 4	None, Fire only	Command 4, Marine Support Unit 4, Utility 4	Station 4
Benedict Volunteer Fire Department	Benedict, MD	Engine 51, Rescue Engine 52, Engine 54, Engine 55	Fire Boat 5	Foam Tanker 5	Ambulance 58	Command 5, Marine Support Unit 5, EMS Car 5, Utility 5, EMS Utility 5	Station 5
Cobb Island Volunteer Fire Department	Cobb Island, MD	Engine 61, Rescue Engine 62, Engine 64	Fire Boat 6, Inflatable Boat 6, Brush 6	Tanker 6	Ambulance 68, Ambulance 69, Career ALS Staffing	Command 6, Marine Support Unit 6, Utility 6, EMS Utility 6	Station 6
Potomac Heights Volunteer Fire Department	Potomac Heights, MD	Engine 72, Engine 73, Engine 74	Fire Boat 7, Squad 7, Collapse Support 7, Brush 7	Tanker 7	Ambulance 78, Ambulance 79	Command 7, Marine Support Unit 7, Utility 7	Station 7
Tenth District Volunteer Fire Department	Marbury, MD	Engine 82, Engine 83, Engine 84	Fire Boat 8, Airboat 8, Inflatable Boat 8, Squad 8, Brush 8, ATV 8	Tanker 8	Ambulance 87, Paramedic Ambulance 89, Career ALS Staffing	Command 8, Marine Support Unit 8, Boat Support Unit 8, Car 8, Vehicle 8, Utility 8, EMS Utility 8	Station 8
Indian Head Volunteer Fire Department	Indian Head, MD	Engine 91, Engine 92, Engine 94	Tower 9, Special Unit 9 (HazMat Support), Brush 9	None	Ambulance 98	Command 9	Station 9
Bel Alton Volunteer Fire Department	Bel Alton, MD	Engine 101, Engine 102, Engine 104	Squad 10, Brush 10	Foam Tanker 10	Ambulance 109	Command 10	Station 10
Bryans Road Volunteer Fire Department	Bryans Road, MD	Engine 112, Rescue Engine 113, Engine 114	Truck 11, Brush 11	Engine Tanker 11	Ambulance 118, Ambulance 119, Career ALS Staffing	Command 11, Utility 11	Station 11
Waldorf Volunteer Fire Department (Westlake)	St. Charles, MD	Engine 121, Rescue Engine 123, Engine 124	Truck 12, Brush 12	Foam Tanker 12	Ambulance 127, Ambulance 129	Command 12, Utility 12	Station 12
Charles County Dive Rescue	Pomfret, MD	None, Dive Rescue only	Rescue Boat 13, Dive Boat 13, Dive Boat 13A, Dive Boat 13B	None, Dive Rescue only	None, Dive Rescue only	Dive Support 13, Dive Rescue 13, Marine Support Unit 13, Utility 13	Station 13
Newburg Volunteer Fire Department	Newburg, MD	Rescue Engine 141, Engine 143, Engine 144	Fire Boat 14, Brush 14	Tanker 14	Ambulance 148, Ambulance 149	(Unknown)	Station 14
Dentsville EMS, Fire & Auxiliary	La Plata, MD	Engine 151, Engine 154	None	None	Ambulance 158	EMS Utility 15	Station 15
Charles County Department of Emergency Services (Career ALS)	La Plata, MD	None	HazMat 16, HazMat Support 16, Mass Casualty 16, ATV 16	None	Ambulance 167, Ambulance 168, Ambulance 169, North Medical Duty Officer, South Medical Duty Officer	(Unknown)	Station 16
Charles County Volunteer Fire and EMS Association	La Plata, MD	None	None	None	None	Chief 17, Chief 17A, EMS Chief 17, EMS Chief 17A, Spec Operations Chief 17, Spec Operation Chief 17A, Car 17	Station 17
Naval District of Washington Fire Department	Naval Surface Warfare Center Indian Head	Engine 201	Truck 20, HazMat 20, Boat 20, Boat 20B	None	Paramedic Ambulance 209	Utility 20	Station 20
Naval District of Washington Fire Department	Naval Surface Warfare Center Stump Neck	Engine 211	Brush 21	None	None, Fire only	Utility 21	Station 21
Charles County Volunteer Rescue Squad	La Plata, MD	None, EMS only	None, EMS only	None, EMS only	Ambulance 517, Ambulance 518, Ambulance 519, Career ALS Staffing	Command 51, EMS Utility 51	Station 51
Ironsides Volunteer Rescue Squad	Ironsides, MD	None, EMS only	Mass Casualty 58	None, EMS only	Ambulance 588, Ambulance 589	(Unknown)	Station 58
Charles County Mobile Intensive Care Unit	White Plains, MD	None, EMS only	None, EMS only	None, EMS only	Ambulance 607, Ambulance 608, Ambulance 609, Medic 60, Medic 60A, Career ALS Staffing	Utility 60	Station 60

== Dorchester County ==
Fire Department	Town/City	Station Number
Rescue Fire Company, Inc.	Cambridge	Station 1
Hurlock Volunteer Fire Company	Hurlock	Station 6
Vienna Volunteer Fire Company	Vienna	Station 11
Secretary Volunteer Fire Company	Secretary	Station 16
East New Market Volunteer Fire Company	East New Market	Station 21
Eldorado Brookview Fire Company	Eldorado	Station 26
Neck District Volunteer Fire Company	Neck District	Station 31
Lakes & Straits Volunteer Fire Department, Inc.	Wingate	Station 41
Church Creek Volunteer Fire Company	Church Creek	Station 46
Hoopers Island Volunteer Fire Department	Fishing Creek	Station 51
Madison Volunteer Fire Department	Madison	Station 56
Linkwood Salem Volunteer Fire Department	Linkwood	Station 61
Taylor's Island Volunteer Fire Department	Taylors Island	Station 66
Elliott's Island Volunteer Fire Department	Elliott's Island	Station 71

== Frederick County ==
Fire Department	Town/City	Station Number
Independent Hose Company	Frederick	Station 1
Junior Fire Company	Frederick	Station 2
United Steam Engine Company	Frederick	Station 3
Citizens Truck Company	Frederick	Station 4
Brunswick Volunteer Fire Department	Brunswick	Station 5
Vigilant Hose Company	Emmitsburg	Station 6
Middletown Volunteer Fire Department	Middletown	Station 7
Myersville Volunteer Fire Department	Myersville	Station 8
New Midway Volunteer Fire Department	New Midway	Station 9
Guardian Hose Company	Thurmont	Station 10
Walkersville Volunteer Fire Department	Walkersville	Station 11
Braddock Heights Volunteer Fire Department	Braddock Heights	Station 12
Rocky Ridge Volunteer Fire Department	Rocky Ridge	Station 13
Carroll Manor Volunteer Fire Department	Adamstown	Station 14
New Market District Volunteer Fire Department	New Market	Station 15
Woodsboro Volunteer Fire Department	Woodsboro	Station 16
Libertytown Volunteer Fire Department	Libertytown	Station 17
Brunswick Volunteer Ambulance & Rescue Company	Brunswick	Station 19
Jefferson Volunteer Fire Department	Jefferson	Station 20
Wolfsville Volunteer Fire Department	Wolfsville	Station 21
Lewistown Volunteer Fire Department	Lewistown	Station 22
Urbana Volunteer Fire Department	Urbana	Station 23
Walkersville Volunteer Rescue Company	Walkersville	Station 24
New Market District Volunteer Fire Department - Green Valley Sub-station	Green Valley	Station 25
Carroll Manor Volunteer Fire Department - Point of Rocks Sub-station	Point of Rocks	Station 28
Frederick County Fire Rescue	Northgate	Station 29
Thurmont Community Ambulance Company	Thurmont	Station 30
United Steam Engine Company - Westview Substation	Frederick	Station 31
United Steam Engine Company - Spring Ridge Substation	Frederick	Station 33
Fort Detrick Fire and Emergency Services	Frederick	Station 50
Naval Support Facility Thurmont Fire and Emergency Services	Thurmont	Station 51

Graceham Volunteer Fire Company Station 18, voted to dissolve in July 2024

== Garrett County ==
Fire Department	Town/City	Station Number
Northern Garrett County Rescue Squad	Grantsville	Station 1
Northern Garrett County Rescue Squad	McHenry	Station 2
Northern Garrett County Rescue Squad	Friendsville	Station 3
Southern Garrett County Rescue Squad	Mountain Lake Park	Station 9
Deer Park Community Volunteer Fire Department	Deer Park	Station 20
Deep Creek Volunteer Fire Company	McHenry	Station 30
Oakland Volunteer Fire Department	Oakland	Station 40
Accident Volunteer Fire Department	Accident	Station 50
Grantsville Volunteer Fire Department	Grantsville	Station 60
Eastern Garrett County Vol. Fire & Rescue Dept.	Frostburg	Station 80
Bittinger Volunteer Fire Department	Bittinger	Station 90
Bloomington Volunteer Fire Department	Bloomington	Station 100
Friendsville Vol. Fire & Rescue Dept.	Friendsville	Station 110
Gorman Volunteer Fire Department	Gorman	Station 120

== Harford County ==
Fire Department	Equipment	Town/City	Station Number	Number of Stations
Level Volunteer Fire Company	Rescue Engine 1, Engine 112, Engine 113, Tanker 1, Brush 1, Rescue 1, Supply 1, Ambulance 1-1, Ambulance 1-2, Utility 1-9	Havre de Grace	Company 1	1
Aberdeen Fire Department	Engine 211, Engine 212, Engine 213, Engine 214, Engine 215, Truck 2, Brush 2, Rescue 2, Utility 2-1, Utility 2-2, Ambulance 2-1, Ambulance 2-2	Aberdeen	Company 2	2
Bel Air Volunteer Fire Company	Engine 312, Engine 313, Engine 314, Engine 315, Engine 316, Tower 3, Quint 3, Brush 3-1, Brush 3-2, Rescue 3, Medic 3-1, Medic 3-2, Medic 3-3, Medic 3-4, Medic 3-5, Medic 3-6, Utility 372, Utility 373, Utility 388 (Rehab Unit), Utility 383 (ATV), Utility 399	Bel Air	Company 3	3
Abingdon Fire Company	Engine 411, Engine 412, Engine 413, Engine 415, Truck 4, Brush 4-1, Rescue 4, Rescue Boat 4, Utility 4-1, Utility 4-2, Ambulance 4-1, Ambulance 4-2, Ambulance 4-3, Ambulance 4-4, Utility 4-7, Utility 4-8	Abingdon	Company 4	3
Susquehanna Hose Company	Engine 511, Engine 512, Engine 513, Engine 514, Engine 515, Tower 5, Quint 5, Rescue Engine 5, Marine 5, Dive Unit 5, Swiftwater Unit 5, Utility 5-1, Utility 5-2, Utility 5-3, Utility 5-4, Utility 5-5,	Havre de Grace	Company 5	5
Havre de Grace Ambulance Corps	Ambulance 591, Ambulance 592, Ambulance 593, Utility 595, Special Unit 598	Havre de Grace	Company 5-9	1
Whiteford Volunteer Fire Company	Rescue Engine 6, Engine 612, Truck 6, Brush 6, Utility 6-1, Special Unit 688,	Whiteford	Company 6	1
Jarrettsville Volunteer Fire Company	Engine 711, Engine 712, Engine 713, Brush 7-1, Brush 7-2, Rescue 7, Utility 7-2, Supply 7, Ambulance 7-1, Ambulance 7-2	Jarrettsville	Company 7	2
Joppa Magnolia Volunteer Fire Company	Engine 811, Engine 812, Engine 814, Truck 8, Medic 8-1, Medic 8-2, Medic 8-3, Medic 8-4, Medic 8-5	Joppa	Company 8	3
Darlington Volunteer Fire Company	Engine 911, Engine 912, Engine 913, Brush 9-1, Rescue 9, Boat 9-1, Boat 9-2, Air 9, Utility 9-1, Special Unit 9-5, Ambulance 9-1, Ambulance 9-2	Darlington	Company 9	2
Norrisville Volunteer Fire Company	Engine 1011, Engine 1013, Tanker 10, Brush 10, Rescue 10, Utility 10-1, Medic 10-1, Utility 10-9	Pylesville	Company 10	1
Aberdeen Proving Ground Fire & Emergency Services	Quint 12, Engine 1211, Engine 1212, Engine 1213, Engine 1214, Crash 1281, Special Unit 1282, Tanker 12, Haz-Mat 12, Command 1202, Brush 1241, Rescue 1251, Utility 1263, Utility 1266, Utility 1267, Utility 1274, Medic 1292, Medic 1293	APG	Station 12	3
Fallston Volunteer Fire and Ambulance	Engine 1311, Engine 1312, Tanker 13, Truck 13, Rescue 13, Utility 13-1, Special Unit 13, Ambulance 13-1, Ambulance 13-2, Ambulance 13-3	Fallston	Company 13	2

== Howard County ==
No.	Station	Battalion	Equipment	Responses
1	Elkridge	1	Engine (2), Tower, Brush Truck, ALS Transport, BLS Transport	4757
2	Ellicott City	2	Engine (2), Aerial Tower, Truck, Brush Truck, ALS Transport, BLS Transport	7498
3	West Friendship	2	Engine (2), Aerial Tower, Tanker (2), Brush Truck, ALS Transport, BLS Transport	2686
4	Lisbon	2	Engine (2), Rescue Engine, Engine-Tanker, Brush Truck(2), ALS Transport	2090
5	Clarksville	2	Engine (2), Tanker, Brush Truck, Boat, ALS Transport, BLS Transport	2939
6	Savage	1	Engine, Squad, Aerial Ladder, Brush Truck, ALS Transport (2) Medic 66	6656
7	Banneker	2	Engine, Aerial Ladder, Brush Truck, ALS Transport	8427
8	Bethany	2	Engine (2), Brush Truck, ALS Transport, BLS Transport	4435
9	Long Reach	1	Engine (2), ALS Transport, BLS Transport	9914
10	Rivers Park	1	Engine, Aerial Tower, Special Operations, ALS Transport	6100
11	Scaggsville	1	Engine, Tanker, Brush Truck, Boat, ALS Transport	3024

12 Waterloo 7645 Port Capital Dr. Jessup MD Engine 121, P125, B128, BC 1

13 {Glenwood in Woodbine Maryland 1 Engine 1 ALS transport Tanker Brush Truck

14 Merriweather in Columbia Maryland 6025 Symphony Woods Rd, Columbia, MD 21044

== Kent County ==
Fire Department	Town/City	Station Number
Community Fire Company	Millington	Station 2
Galena Volunteer Fire Department	Galena	Station 3
Kennedyville Volunteer Fire Department	Kennedyville	Station 4
Betterton Volunteer Fire Department	Betterton	Station 5
Chestertown Volunteer Fire Department	Chestertown	Station 6
Rock Hall Volunteer Fire Department	Rock Hall	Station 7
Kent & Queen Anne's Rescue Squad	Chestertown	Station 8

== Montgomery County ==
See Montgomery County Fire and Rescue Service.

Fire Department	Town/City	Station Number
Silver Spring Volunteer Fire Department	Downtown Silver Spring	Station 1
Takoma Park Volunteer Fire Department	Takoma Park	Station 2
Rockville Volunteer Fire Department	Rockville	Station 3
Sandy Spring Volunteer Fire Department	Sandy Spring	Station 4
Kensington Volunteer Fire Department	Kensington	Station 5
Bethesda Volunteer Fire Department	Downtown Bethesda	Station 6
Chevy Chase Fire Company	Chevy Chase	Station 7
Gaithersburg-Washington Grove Volunteer Fire Department	Gaithersburg/Montgomery Village	Station 8
Hyattstown Volunteer Fire Department	Hyattstown	Station 9
Cabin John Park Volunteer Fire Department	Cabin John	Station 10
Glen Echo Fire Department	Glen Echo	Station 11
Hillandale Volunteer Fire Department	Hillandale	Station 12
Damascus Volunteer Fire Department	Damascus	Station 13
Upper Montgomery County Volunteer Fire Department	Beallsville	Station 14
Burtonsville Volunteer Fire Department	Burtonsville	Station 15
Silver Spring Volunteer Fire Department	Four Corners	Station 16
Laytonsville District Volunteer Fire Department	Laytonsville	Station 17
Kensington Volunteer Fire Department	Glenmont	Station 18
Silver Spring Volunteer Fire Department	Montgomery Hills	Station 19
Bethesda Volunteer Fire Department	Cedar Lane	Station 20
Kensington Volunteer Fire Department	Veirs Mill Village	Station 21
Montgomery County Fire & Rescue	Kingsview	Station 22
Rockville Volunteer Fire Department	Twinbrook	Station 23
Hillandale Volunteer Fire Department	Colesville	Station 24
Kensington Volunteer Fire Department	Aspen Hill	Station 25
Bethesda Volunteer Fire Department	Democracy Boulevard	Station 26
Gaithersburg-Washington Grove Volunteer Fire Department	Derwood	Station 28
Germantown Volunteer Fire Department	Germantown	Station 29
Cabin John Park Volunteer Fire Department	Potomac	Station 30
Rockville Volunteer Fire Department	North Potomac	Station 31
Montgomery County Fire & Rescue	Travilah	Station 32
Rockville Volunteer Fire Department	Falls Road	Station 33
Montgomery County Fire & Rescue	Milestone	Station 34
Montgomery County Fire & Rescue	Clarksburg	Station 35
Sandy Spring Volunteer Fire Department	Olney	Station 40
Bethesda-Chevy Chase Rescue Squad	Bethesda	Rescue Company 1
Wheaton Volunteer Rescue Squad	Wheaton	Rescue Company 2
Naval Support Activity Bethesda	Walter Reed National Military Medical Center	Station 50
National Institutes of Health	National Institutes of Health	Station 51
Naval Support Facility Carderock	Carderock Division of the Naval Surface Warfare Center	Station 52
National Institute of Standards and Technology	National Institute of Standards and Technology	Station 53
Fort Detrick Forest Glen Annex	Fort Detrick Forest Glen Annex	Station 54

== Prince George's County ==
Prince George's County Fire/EMS Department

Fire Department	Town/City	Battalion	Engines	Special Services	Tankers	EMS Vehicles	Miscellaneous	Station Number
Hyattsville Volunteer Fire Department	Hyattsville	4th	Engine	Rescue Squad, Truck		Ambulance		Station 801
Prince George's County Fire/EMS Department - Shady Glen	Capitol Heights	3rd	Engine	Truck		Paramedic Ambulance		Station 802
Capitol Heights Volunteer Fire Department	Capitol Heights	3rd	Paramedic Engine			Paramedic Ambulance		Station 805
Prince George's County Fire/EMS Department - Springdale	Springdale	1st	Engine	Rescue Squad		Ambulance, Paramedic Ambulance	Technical Rescue Unit	Station 806
Riverdale Volunteer Fire Department	Riverdale	4th	Engine	Tower		Ambulance		Station 807
Bladensburg Volunteer Fire Department & Rescue Squad	Bladensburg	4th	Engine	Truck		Ambulance		Station 809
Laurel Volunteer Fire Department	Laurel	6th	Engine	Tower		Ambulance, Medic Unit		Station 810
Branchville Volunteer Fire Company & Rescue Squad	College Park	6th	Engine			Ambulance		Station 811
College Park Volunteer Fire Department	College Park	4th	Engine	Truck		Ambulance, Medic Unit	HazMat Unit, Foam Unit	Station 812
Riverdale Heights Volunteer Fire Department	Riverdale	4th	Engine			Ambulance		Station 813
Berwyn Heights Volunteer Fire Department & Rescue Squad	Berwyn Heights	6th		Truck, Rescue Squad		Ambulance		Station 814
Prince George's County Fire/EMS Department - Northview	Bowie	2nd	Engine			Paramedic Ambulance	Air Unit, HazMat Unit	Station 816
Boulevard Heights Volunteer Fire & Rescue Department	Capitol Heights	3rd	Engine			Ambulance		Station 817
Glenn Dale Fire Association	Glenn Dale	2nd	Engine, Rescue Engine	Rescue Squad, Tower		Ambulance, Paramedic Ambulance		Station 818
Bowie Volunteer Fire Department & Rescue Squad	Bowie	2nd	Engine			Ambulance		Station 819
Marlboro Volunteer Fire Department	Upper Marlboro	7th	Engine	Rescue Squad	Tanker	Paramedic Ambulance	Brush	Station 820
Oxon Hill Volunteer Fire & Rescue Company	Oxon Hill	5th	Engine	Truck		Paramedic Ambulance		Station 821
Forestville Volunteer Fire Department	Forestville	3rd	Engine		Tanker	Ambulance, Paramedic Ambulance	Brush	Station 823
Accokeek Volunteer Fire Department	Accokeek	5th	Engine	Tower		Ambulance	Brush, Mini-Pumper	Station 824
Clinton Volunteer Fire Department	Clinton	7th	Engine	Truck	Water Supply Unit	Ambulance, Paramedic Ambulance		Station 825
District Heights Volunteer Fire Department	District Heights	3rd	Engine	Truck		Ambulance, Paramedic Ambulance		Station 826
Morningside Volunteer Fire Department	Morningside	3rd	Engine, Rescue Engine	Rescue Squad		Ambulance		Station 827
West Lanham Hills Volunteer Fire Department	Lanham	1st	Engine	Truck			Mini-Pumper	Station 828
Silver Hill Volunteer Fire Department & Rescue Squad	Silver Hill	3rd	Engine	Truck		Ambulance, Paramedic Ambulance		Station 829
Landover Hills Volunteer Fire Department	Landover Hills	1st	Engine, Paramedic Engine			Ambulance, Paramedic Ambulance		Station 830
Beltsville Volunteer Fire Department	Beltsville	6th	Engine	Truck		Ambulance	Brush	Station 831
Allentown Road Volunteer Fire Department	Fort Washington	5th	Engine	Truck		Ambulance, Paramedic Ambulance	Brush	Station 832
Kentland Volunteer Fire Department	Kentland	1st	Engine, Rescue Engine	Tower		Ambulance	Mini-Pumper	Station 833
Chillum-Adelphi Volunteer Fire Department	Langley Park	4th	Engine	Truck		Ambulance		Station 834
Greenbelt Volunteer Fire Department & Rescue Squad	Greenbelt	6th	Engine			Ambulance, Paramedic Ambulance		Station 835
Baden Volunteer Fire Department	Baden	7th	Paramedic Engine		Engine-Tanker, Tanker	Ambulance	Brush	Station 836
Ritchie Volunteer Fire Department	Capitol Heights	1st	Engine				Mini-Pumper	Station 837
Chapel Oaks Volunteer Fire Company	Capitol Heights	1st	Engine			Ambulance, Paramedic Ambulance		Station 838
Bowie Volunteer Fire Department & Rescue Squad	Bowie	2nd	Engine	Tower		Ambulance	Brush	Station 839
Volunteer Fire Department of Brandywine	Brandywine	7th	Paramedic Engine, Rescue Engine	Rescue Squad	Tanker	Paramedic Ambulance	Brush	Station 840
Prince George's County Fire/EMS Department - Calverton	Calverton	6th	Paramedic Engine			Paramedic Ambulance	HazMat Unit	Station 841
Oxon Hill Volunteer Fire & Rescue Company	Glassmanor	5th	Engine, Paramedic Engine			Paramedic Ambulance		Station 842
Bowie Volunteer Fire Department & Rescue Squad	Bowie	2nd	Engine	Truck	Tanker	Ambulance		Station 843
Prince George's County Fire/EMS Department - Chillum	Chillum	4th	Paramedic Engine			Ambulance, Paramedic Ambulance		Station 844
Prince George's County Fire/EMS Department - Croom	Croom	7th	Engine		Tanker	Paramedic Ambulance	HazMat Unit	Station 845
Kentland Volunteer Fire Department	Largo	1st	Paramedic Engine			Ambulance, Paramedic Ambulance		Station 846
Prince George's County Fire/EMS Department - Fort Washington	Fort Washington	5th	Engine	Rescue Squad		Paramedic Ambulance	Boat, Technical Rescue Support Unit	Station 847
West Lanham Hills Volunteer Fire Department	Lanham	1st	Engine, Paramedic Engine			Ambulance, Paramedic Ambulance	Brush	Station 848
Laurel Volunteer Rescue Squad	Laurel	6th	Engine, Rescue Engine	Rescue Squad		Ambulance	Boat, Water Rescue	Station 849
Prince George's County Fire/EMS Department - Bunker Hill	Brentwood	4th	Engine			Ambulance	Mass-Casualty Unit, Mini-Pumper	Station 855
Prince George's County Volunteer Marine Fire and Rescue - Water Rescue	Baden						Air Boat	Station 856
Prince George's County Volunteer Marine Fire and Rescue - Dive Rescue	Fort Washington						Dive Unit, Fire Boat	Station 857
Prince George's County Fire/EMS Department - National Harbor	National Harbor	5th				Ambulance	Cart, Fire Boat	Station 858

== Queen Anne's County ==
Fire Department	Town/City	Engines	Special Services	Tankers	EMS Vehicles	Miscellaneous	Station Number
Kent Island VFD	Stevensville, MD	Engine 12, Engine 14	Rescue 1, Tower 1	Engine Tanker 1	Ambulance 1, Ambulance 10	Fire Boat 1, Utility 1, UTV 1, Hazmat 1, Decon 1, Chief 1, Chief 10	Station 1
Grasonville VFD	Grasonville, MD	Engine 22, Engine 25	Rescue 2, Truck 2	Engine Tanker 2	Ambulance 20	Fire Boat 2, Utility 2, Brush 2, Chief 2	Station 2
Queenstown VFD	Queenstown, MD	Engine 32, Engine 33	Rescue 3	Engine Tanker 3	Ambulance 3	Brush 3, UTV 3, Chief 3	Station 3
Goodwill VFD	Centerville, MD	Engine 44, Engine 45	Squad 4, Tower 4	Engine Tanker 4	Ambulance 4, Ambulance 40	Brush 4, Special Unity 49, Chief 4, Chief 40	Station 4
Church Hill VFD	Church Hill, MD	Engine 55,	Squad 5, Tower Ladder 5	Engine Tanker 5	Ambulance 5	Special Unit 59, Brush 5, Chief 5	Station 5
Sudlersville VFD	Sudlersville, MD	Engine 64,	Rescue 6, Quint 6	Tanker 6		Special Unit 69, Brush 6, Utility 6, Utility 60, Gator 6, Chief 6	Station 6
Crumpton VFD	Crumpton, MD	Engine 71,	Rescue Engine 7	Engine Tanker 7	Ambulance 70	Special Unit 79, Brush 7, Chief 7	Station 7
Queen Anne-Hillsboro VFD	Queen Anne-Hillsboro, MD	Engine 85,	Rescue 84	Tanker 86	Ambulance 80	Brush 87, Utility 83, Chief 80	Station 80
United Communities VFD	United Communities, MD	Engine 91, Engine 92		Tanker 9	Ambulance 9, Ambulance 90	Fire Boat 9, Brush 9, Utility 9, Special Unit 99, Chief 9	Station 9
Queen Anne's County Department of Emergency Services	Stevensville, MD				Paramedic 100		Station 100
Queen Anne's County Department of Emergency Services	Stevensville, MD				Paramedic 200	EMS 4	Station 200
Queen Anne's County Department of Emergency Services	Queenstown, MD				Paramedic 300		Station 3 (Stationed at Queenstown Vol. Fire Department)
Queen Anne's County Department of Emergency Services	Centreville, MD				Paramedic 400	EMS 3	Station 400
Queen Anne's County Department of Emergency Services	Church Hill, MD				Paramedic 500		Station 5 (Stationed at Church Hill Vol. Fire Department)
Queen Anne's County Department of Emergency Services	Sudlersville, MD				Paramedic 600		Station 6 (Stationed at Sudlersville Vol. Fire Department)

== St. Mary's County ==
Fire Department	Town/City	Station Number	Engines	Special Service	Tankers	Support and Command
Leonardtown Volunteer Fire Department	Leonardtown	Company 1	Engine 10, Engine 11	Truck 1, Rescue Squad 1	Engine(T) 14	Brush 1, Jeep 1, ATV 1, Command 1, Utility 1
Mechanicsville Volunteer Fire Department	Mechanicsville	Company 2/Station 22	Engine 21, Engine 23	Rescue Engine 222, Rescue Squad 2	Engine(T) 24, Tanker 2	Brush 2, Utilities 2/2A, Command 2, Car 2, MSU 22, Raft 22
Bay District Volunteer Fire Department	Lexington Park	Company 3	Engine 32	Truck 3, Rescue Squad 3	Engine(T) 33	Brush 3, Utility 3, Command 3, Car 3
Ridge Volunteer Fire Department	Ridge	Company 4	Engine 43	Rescue Engine 42	Engine(T) 44, Tanker 4	Brush 4, Jeep 4, Utilities 4/4A, Command 4, MSU 4, Boat 4
Seventh District Volunteer Fire Department	Avenue	Company 5	Engine 52, Engine 54	Rescue Squad 5	Engine 51(T), Tanker 5	Brush 5/5A, Water Supply 5, Utility 5/5A, Command 5, MSU 5, Boat 5, Raft 5, UTV 5.
Second District Volunteer Fire Department And Rescue Squad	Valley Lee	Company 6	Engine 61	Squad 6	Engine(T) 63	Brush 6, Jeep 6, Command 6, MSU 6, Boat 6
Hollywood Volunteer Fire Department	Hollywood	Company 7	Engine 73	Rescue Engine 72, Truck 7, Rescue Squad 7	Engine(T) 74	Brush 7, Jeep 7, Utility 7, Command 7, Car 7
Bay District Volunteer Fire Department	California	Company 9	Engine 91	Rescue Engine 92, Tower 9	Engine(T) 93	Brush 9, Utility 9, Command 9
Naval District Washington Fire Department	NAS Patuxent River	Company 13	Engine 131, Engine 132, Engine 134	Truck 13, Hazmat 13	0	Foam 135, Foam 136, Foam 137, Foam 138, Battalion Chief 13, Chief 13A
Naval District Washington Fire Department	NAS Webster Field	Company 14	Engine 141		0	Foam 143, Foam 144, Foam 145
St. Mary's County Hazmat Team	St. Mary's County	Company 18	0	Hazmat 181, Hazmat 182, Hazmat 183	0	Command 18

== Somerset County ==
Fire Department	City	Station number
Ewell Fire Company	Ewell, Smith Island	Station 1
Crisfield Fire Department	Crisfield	Station 2
Marion Fire Department	Marion Station	Station 3
Deal Island-Chance Fire Company	Deal Island	Station 4
Princess Anne Fire Company & EMS	Princess Anne	Station 5
Mount Vernon Fire Company	Mount Vernon	Station 6
Tylerton Fire Company	Tylerton, Smith Island	Station 7
Lower Somerset EMS	Crisfield	Station 8
Fairmount Fire Company	Fairmount	Station 9
Somerset Swiftwater Team	County-Wide	Station 10

== Talbot County ==
Fire Department	Town/City	Station Number	Engines	Rescue	Tower/Ladder	Tankers	Brush	EMS Vehicles	Special Services	Boat	Miscellaneous
Oxford Fire Co. Inc.	Oxford	Station 20	Engine 25, Engine 28		Truck 23	Tanker 20	Brush 26	Ambulance 20, Ambulance 21		Boat 20	
Trappe Vol. Fire Co. Inc.	Trappe	Station 30	Engine 38, Engine 39	Rescue 32		Tanker 36	Brush 35				
St. Michaels Fire Co. Inc.	St. Michaels	Station 40	Engine 48, Engine 49		Truck 40	Tanker 44	Brush 47	Ambulance 40	Utility 40	Boat 40	
Cordova Volunteers Firemen's Association	Cordova	Station 50	Engine 51, Engine 52, Engine 54			Tanker 53	Brush 56	Ambulance 51	Utility 57		
Easton Vol. Fire Dept. Inc.	Easton	Station 60	Engine 63, Engine 64, Engine 65, Engine 67, Engine 68,	Rescue 61	Tower 61	Tanker 61	Brush 66, Brush 69	Ambulance 60	Utility 61, Utility 62, Chief 60, Chief 61,		
Easton Vol. Fire Dept. Inc. Substation	Easton	Station 66									Substation on Matthewstown Road
Tilghman Vol. Fire Co. Inc.	Tilghman	Station 70	Engine73, Engine 77			Tanker 74			Chief 70	Boat 70	
Queen Anne Hillsboro Vol. Fire Co.	Queen Anne	Station 80	Engine 84	Rescue 84		Tanker 86	Brush 87	Ambulance 80	Utility 83, UTV 80		

- Queen Anne-Hillsboro Volunteer Fire Co. from Talbot County. The town of Hillsboro is in Caroline County, while the town of Queen Anne lies in both Queen Anne's and Talbot Counties.

== Washington County ==
Fire Department	Town/City	Station Number
Sharpsburg Vol. Fire Co.	Sharpsburg	Station 1
Williamsport Vol. Fire Co.	Williamsport	Station 2
Clear Spring Vol. Fire Co.	Clear Spring	Station 4
Hancock Vol. Firemens Assoc.	Hancock	Station 5
First Hose Company of Boonsboro	Boonsboro	Station 6
Smithsburg Vol. Fire Co.	Smithsburg	Station 7
Leitersburg Vol. Fire Co.	Leitersburg	Station 9
Funkstown Vol. Fire Co.	Funkstown	Station 10
Potomac Valley Vol. Fire Co.	Sharpsburg	Station 11
Fairplay Vol. Fire Co.	Fairplay	Station 12
Maugansville Vol. Fire Co.	Maugansville	Station 13
Mount Aetna Vol. Fire Co.	Mt Aetna	Station 16
Sharpsburg Area EMS	Sharpsburg	Station 19
Vol. Fire Co. of Halfway	Halfway	Station 26
Long Meadow Vol. Fire Co.	Hagerstown	Station 27
Williamsport Ambulance Co.	Williamsport	Station 29
Clear Spring Ambulance Squad	Clear Spring	Station 49
Hancock Rescue Squad	Hancock	Station 59
Boonsboro Ambulance Squad	Boonsboro	Station 69
Community Rescue Service	Hagerstown	Station 75
Smithsburg Ambulance	Smithsburg	Station 79
Washington County Rehab Unit	Halfway	Station 25
Washington County Air Unit	Halfway	Station 25
Washington County HazMat	Hagerstown	Station 20

Hagerstown Fire Departments	Equipment	Station Number
First Hagerstown Hose Company	Engine 1	1
Antietam Fire Company	Engine 2	2
Independent Hose Company	Engine 3	3
Western Enterprise Fire Company	Engine 4, Truck 4	4
South Hagerstown Fire Company	Engine 5	5
Pioneer Hook & Ladder	Truck 1	6

== Wicomico County ==
Fire Department	Town/City	Station Number
Salisbury Fire Department	Salisbury	Station 1
Salisbury Fire Department	Salisbury	Station 2
Fruitland Volunteer Fire Company	Fruitland	Station 3
Delmar Fire Department	Delmar	Station 74¹
Hebron Fire Department	Hebron	Station 5
Parsonsburg Volunteer Fire Company	Parsonsburg	Station 6
Pittsville Fire Department, Inc.	Pittsville	Station 7
Willards Volunteer Fire Company, Inc.	Willards	Station 8
Mardela Springs Volunteer Fire Company	Mardela	Station 9
Salisbury-Wicomico Regional Airport	Salisbury	(Station 10)²
Powellville Volunteer Fire Company	Powellville	Station 11
West Side Volunteer Fire Department	Bivalve	Station 12
Sharptown Fire Department	Sharptown	Station 14
Allen Fire Department	Allen	Station 15
Salisbury Fire Department	Salisbury	Station 16

- 1 - The town of Delmar, Maryland is in Wicomico County, Maryland but the fire company is physically located across the state line in Delmar, Delaware, in Sussex County, Delaware, where it also provides coverage.
- 2 - Informal designation/placeholder, not officially numbered.

== Worcester County ==
Fire Department	Town/City	Station Number
Pocomoke City Volunteer Fire Company, Inc.	Pocomoke	Station 100
Stockton Volunteer Fire Company	Stockton	Station 200
Girdletree Volunteer Fire Company	Girdletree	Station 300
Snow Hill Volunteer Fire Company	Snow Hill	Station 400
Newark Volunteer Fire Company	Newark	Station 500
Berlin Fire Company	Berlin	Station 600
Ocean City Volunteer Fire Company	Ocean City	Station 700
Showell Volunteer Fire Department	Showell	Station 800
Bishopville Volunteer Fire Department, Inc.	Bishopville	Station 900
Ocean Pines Volunteer Fire Department	Ocean Pines	Station 1100

== Defunct ==
Fire Department	Town/City	County	Station Number	Years of Operation	Notes
Bainbridge Naval Training Center Fire Department	Port Deposit	Cecil County	Station 12	1943 - 1976	
Clarysville Volunteer Fire Department	Clarysville	Allegany County	Station 14	? - 2014	Embezzlement
Frostburg Area Ambulance Service	Frostburg	Allegany County	Station 51		Operations taken over by Allegany Department of Emergency Services, re-designated Frostburg Emergency Medical Services
Gibson Island Fire Department	Gibson Island	Anne Arundel County			Private fire brigade for the island
Green Haven Volunteer Fire Company	Green Haven	Anne Arundel County	Station 14	? - 1990	Merged with Powhatan Beach Volunteer Fire Co. in 1990 to form Armiger Volunteer Fire Company
Independent Fire Company #2	Annapolis	Anne Arundel County	Station 37		
Lloyds Volunteer Fire Department	Lloyds	Dorchester County	Station 36		Defunct in 2001 after embezzlement, assets purchased by Rescue Fire Co of Cambridge after Sheriff's sale in October 2001, now operates as a substation of Rescue FC, but no longer their own corporation
Lombardee Beach Volunteer Fire Company	Pasadena	Anne Arundel County	Station 16	? - July 1, 1988	Merged into Orchard Beach Volunteer Fire Co.
Mayo EMS Station	Mayo	Anne Arundel County	Station 22	May 2018 - January 2023	
McCoole Volunteer Fire Department	McCoole	Allegany County	Station 23	1938 - April 2013	Bankruptcy
U.S. Naval Academy Dairy	Gambrills	Anne Arundel County			The US Naval Academy opened their own dairy 14 miles NW of the Naval Academy in 1910 due to a typhoid outbreak, it was finally authorized to close by Congress in 1998. The dairy had its own fire station.
Powhatan Beach Volunteer Fire Company	Pasadena	Anne Arundel County	Station 15	? - 1990	Merged with Green Haven Volunteer Fire Co. in 1990 to form Armiger Volunteer Fire Company
Riva Volunteer Fire Company	Riva	Anne Arundel County	Station 3	1941 - Jun 12, 2024	Merged with the Arundel Volunteer Fire Department, officially taken over as a corporation by the Arundel Volunteer Fire Department, but with the station and apparatus retaining the Riva branding
Seventh District Volunteer Rescue Squad	Shady Side	Anne Arundel County	Station 24		
Singer Fire Department - Job Corps Center	Port Deposit	Cecil County	Station 12	1976 - 1991	
Sparrows Point Fire Department - Bethlehem Steel	Sparrows Point	Baltimore County	Station 51		
Water Witch Hook and Ladder Company, Inc.	Annapolis	Anne Arundel County	Station 39		

== See also ==
- Engine House No. 8 (Baltimore, Maryland)
- Great Baltimore Fire
- Howard County Fire and Rescue (Maryland)
- Maryland State Fire Marshal
- Montgomery County Fire and Rescue Service
- Poppleton Fire Station
