= Montgomery County Fire and Rescue Service =

Public safety agency in Montgomery County, Maryland

Montgomery County Department of Fire and Rescue Services
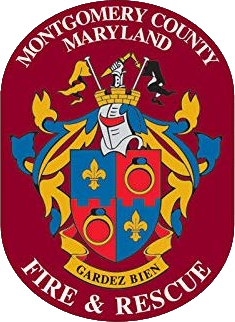

Agency overview
- Annual calls: ~134,000
- Employees: ~1,270 career; ~1165 volunteer; ~100 support staff
- Annual budget: ~$262,000,000
- Staffing: Combination
- Fire chief: Corey Smedley
- EMS level: ALS and BLS
- IAFF: 1664
- Motto: French: Gardez Bien; (in English) Guard Well

Facilities and equipment
- Divisions: 4
- Battalions: 5
- Stations: 39
- Engines: 35
- Trucks: 15
- Rescues: 6
- Ambulances: 45
- HAZMAT: 2
- Light and air: 2

Website
- MontgomeryCountyMD.gov/MCFRS
- https://www.iafflocal1664.org/

The Montgomery County Fire and Rescue Service (MCFRS), officially the Montgomery County Department of Fire and Rescue Services (DFRS), is the public safety agency that provides fire protection and emergency medical services for Montgomery County, Maryland. The services are provided by a combination of paid county personnel and volunteer members of the various independent, non-profit volunteer fire and rescue corporations located throughout the county.

== History ==
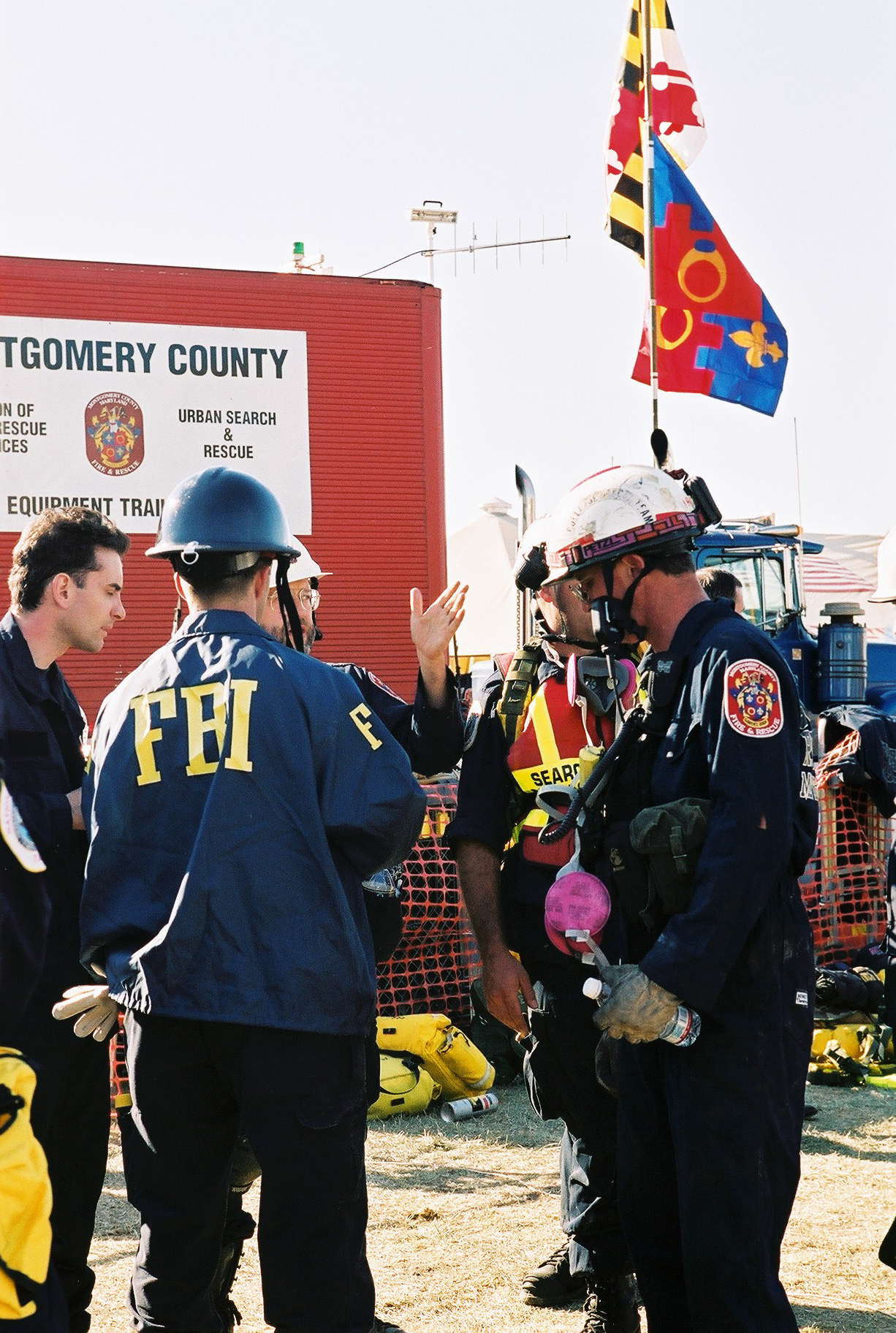
MCFRS personnel with FBI agents at the Pentagon a day after the September 11 attacks in 2001.

Recruit Class 1 for MCFRS began on 2/29/1988.

The MCFRS went to Oklahoma City in 1995 to conduct USAR operations after the Oklahoma City bombing.

In 2001, the MCFRS went to Pentagon in Arlington County, Virginia aboard RideOn buses to assist in urban search and rescue (USAR) efforts immediately after the September 11 attacks.

In 2004, the County Council passed legislation to reorganize the Fire & Rescue Service by placing all personnel, career and volunteer, under the command of a single fire chief. However, actual services are delivered most commonly from career personal operating out of volunteer owned stations across the county with volunteers serving in the evening hours and on weekends to increase manpower during periods of high call volume. This system is due to the population size of the county and need for round the clock services. The county uses the standard incident command system to coordinate the efforts of career and volunteer personnel at the scenes of emergencies.

Montgomery County also works closely with and has mutual aid agreements with DC Fire & EMS, Fairfax County Fire & Rescue, Frederick County Fire & Rescue, Howard County Fire & Rescue, and Prince George's County Fire/EMS.

In April 2020, MCFRS implemented a COVID-19 Surge Plan which included the staffing of more BLS ambulances, as well as moving ALS providers from AFRA and medic units to chase cars. This, paired with a continuous Blue Alert, which goes in effect when an EMS jurisdictional system is temporarily taxed to its limits in providing pre hospital care and ambulance transportation due to extraordinary situations that contribute to high demand for ambulance service, and decontamination teams stationed at each of the main hospitals in the county enabled proper patient distribution and lessoned the burden on the system. The Plan was ended in June 2020.

On June 30, 2023, Fire Chief Scott Goldstein left MCFRS for a fire and rescue department in Cowlitz County, Washington. Goldstein had been chief since June 2015. On July 9, 2024 Montgomery County Council confirmed Corey Smedley appointment as Chief of MCFRS.

== Ranks ==
Fire Chief, Division Chief, Assistant Chief, Battalion Chief, Captain, Lieutenant, Master Firefighter, Firefighter 3, Firefighter 2, Firefighter 1, Recruit, Candidate

== Stations and Apparatus ==
The county is broken into five battalions, with a total of 37 fire stations and 2 rescue squads.

Station	Company	Battalion	Engine Company or Paramedic Engine Company	Special Service Units	EMS Units	Other units	
1	Silver Spring VFD	1st Battalion	PE701		M701, A701, A701B	DCN701	
2	Takoma Park VFD	1st Battalion	PE702, E702B		A702, A702B		
3	Rockville VFD	3rd Battalion	PE703, PE703B	AT703, RS703	M703, A703, A703B, A703C, ALS703	SU703, UT703B, UT703C	
4	Sandy Spring VFD	4th Battalion	PE704		A704	W704	
5	Kensington VFD - Old Town	4th Battalion	PE705, PE705B		A/M705, A/M705B,	B705, CT705, UT705	CH705, CH705B
6	Bethesda FD	2nd Battalion	PE706	T706	A706	UT706	
7*	Chevy Chase FD	2nd Battalion	PE707		A/M707 (BCCRS Staffed)	HM707, UT707	
8	Gaithersburg-Washington Grove VFD	3rd Battalion	PE708	PAT708	M708, A708, A708B, A708C, ALS708	CT708, B708, UT708, UT708B, UTV708, BUTV708	
9	Hyattstown VFD	5th Battalion	PRE709, RE709B			B709, B709B, W709, UT709, UTV709	
10*	Cabin John Park VFD	2nd Battalion	PE710, E710B	T710	A/M710, ALS710	SW710, SW710B, UT710	
11	Glen Echo FD	2nd Battalion	PE711		A711, A/M711B, ALS711	UT711, UTV711	
12	Hillandale VFD	1st Battalion	PE712		M712, A712	BC701, UT712, UTV712	
13	Damascus VFD	5th Battalion	PE713, E713B, BE713	M713, A713	B713, W713		
14*	Upper Montgomery County VFD	5th Battalion	PRE714, BE714		M714, A714	UT714, UTV714, B714, CT714, BT714, SW714, W714	
15	Burtonsville VFD	1st Battalion	PE715, PE715B	T715, RS715	M715, A715	B715, UT715	
16	Silver Spring VFD - Four Corners	1st Battalion	PE716	T716	A716	MAU716	
17	Laytonsville VFD	5th Battalion	PE717, EW717, BE717	RS717	A717	B717, CT717, W717	
18	Kensington VFD - Glenmont	4th Battalion	PE718	AT718	A718	CP718	
19	Silver Spring VFD - Montgomery Hills	1st Battalion	PE719	AT719		EMS701	
20*	Bethesda FD - Midtown Bethesda	2nd Battalion	PE720			BC702	
21	Kensington VFD - Viers Mill Village	4th Battalion	PE721		A721		
22	Kingsview	5th Battalion	PE722, BE722		A722	MAB722, MCSU722, W722, B722	
23*	Rockville VFD - Twinbrook	3rd Battalion	PE723	AT723	M723, A723		
24	Hillandale VFD - Colesville	1st Battalion	PE724, E724B	AT724	A724, A724B	B724	
25*	Kensington VFD - Aspen Hill	4th Battalion	PE725	PT725	A725, A725B,	BC704, EMS704, SU725, BT725	
26	Bethesda FD - North Bethesda	2nd Battalion	PE726		A/M726 (BCCRS staffed)	MAB726, MCSU726	
27	Public Safety Training Academy	X	E727, E727B	T727		CP727	
28*	Gaithersburg-Washington Grove VFD - Derwood	3rd Battalion	PE728		A728	HM728	
29	Germantown VFD	5th Battalion	PE729, PE729B	RS729	M729, A729	BT729, SU729	
30*	Cabin John Park VFD - Potomac	2nd Battalion	PE730		A730	W730, B730, SW730, SW730B, UT730	
31*	Rockville VFD - Quince Orchard	3rd Battalion	PE731	T731	M731	BT731, W731, TR700, TR700B, SU731, UT731, UTV731	
32	Travilah	3rd Battalion	PE732		A732, M732	BC703, EMS703, SA700, DC700, CP732	
33	Rockville VFD - Potomac	3rd Battalion	PE733		A733, A733B	B733, CT733, MAU733	
34	Milestone	5th Battalion	PE734	T734	A734	DCN734, BC705, EMS705	
35	Clarksburg	5th Battalion	PE735	AT735	A735	W735	
40	Sandy Spring VFD - Olney	4th Battalion	PE740	AT740	A740	B740, BT740, CT740, UT740, UTV740, BUTV740	
Rescue Co. 1	Bethesda-Chevy Chase Rescue Squad	2nd Battalion		RS741, RS741B	M741, A741B, A/M741C, A/M741D, ALS741	UT741	
Rescue Co. 2	Wheaton Volunteer Rescue Squad	4th Battalion		RS742, RS742B	A742, A742B, A742C, A742D, ALS742, ALS742B	UT742, UTV742, SU742	

Stations 36 and 39 are not listed as they are not in service as of September 2025.

* Denotes Special Operations Station

- Stations 7, 20, 28, 25 - Hazmat Response Team
- Stations 10, 30, 14 - Swift Water Rescue Team
- Stations 25, 29, 31 - Technical Rescue Team (TRT)
- Station 23 - Emergency Response Team (ERT)

Abbreviations

- A - Ambulance
- ALS - Paramedic Chase Vehicle
- AT - Aerial Tower
- B - Brush
- BC - Battalion Chief
- BE - Brush Engine
- BS - Boat Support
- BT - Boat
- BUTV - Brush Utility Task Vehicle
- CP - Command Post
- CT - Canteen
- DC - Duty Operations Chief
- E - Engine
- EMS - EMS Duty Officer
- EW - Engine Tanker
- HM - HazMat Unit
- M - Medic Unit
- MAB - Medical Ambulance Bus
- MAU - Mobile Air Unit
- MCSU - Medical Care Support Unit
- PAT - Paramedic Aerial Tower
- PBE - Paramedic Brush Engine
- PE - Paramedic Engine
- PRE - Paramedic Rescue Engine
- PT- Paramedic Truck
- RE - Rescue Engine
- RS - Rescue Squad
- SA - Safety Officer
- SU - Support Unit
- SW - Swift Water
- T - Truck
- TR - Technical Rescue
- UTV - Utility Task Vehicle
- W - Tanker

== See also ==
- Fire departments in Maryland
- Urban Search and Rescue Maryland Task Force 1
