= Maryland State Fire Marshal =

Office of the State Fire Marshal
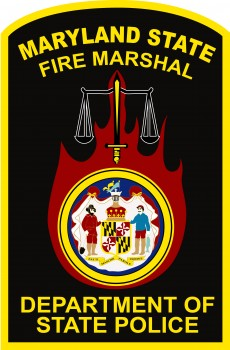

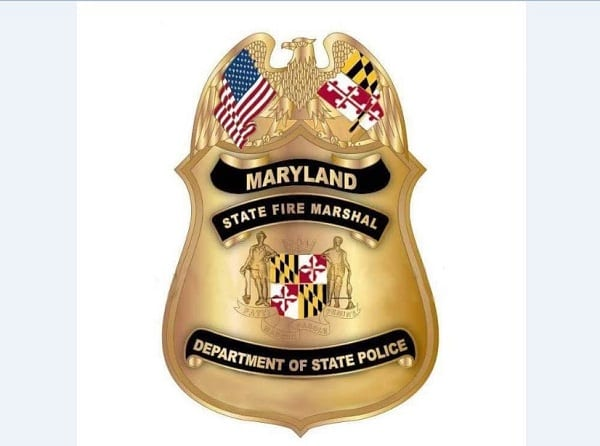
- Abbreviation: OSFM
- Motto: One Mission. One Goal. A Safer Maryland

Agency overview
- Formed: 1894
- Employees: 75
- Volunteers: 0
- Annual budget: $15 m USD (2025)

Jurisdictional structure
- Operations jurisdiction: Maryland, United States
- Area: 12,407
- Population: 6.3 million
- Legal jurisdiction: State of Maryland
- General nature: Civilian police

Operational structure
- Headquarters: Pikesville, Maryland
- Deputy State Fire Marshals: 45
- Fire Protection Engineer, Fire Safety Inspector, Administrative Specialist, Public Affairs Officers: 30
- Agency executive: Jason M. Mowbray, Acting State Fire Marshal
- Parent agency: Department of State Police

Facilities
- Regional offices: Western; Northeast; Southern; Upper Eastern; Lower Eastern; Bomb Squad
- Accelerant Detection K9s: 4
- Explosive Detection K9s: 2
- Facility K9s: 1

Website
- Official website

The Maryland Office of the State Fire Marshal actively works in 17 of 23 Maryland counties. It works under the Department of State Police. The State Fire Marshal shall appoint Assistant State Fire Marshals, Special Assistant State Fire Marshals, and Deputy State Fire Marshals as he/she deems appropriate.

The State Fire Marshal is appointed by the Secretary of the Department of State Police from a list of three candidates given by the state fire prevention commission.

== See also ==
- List of law enforcement agencies in Maryland
- Fire departments in Maryland
