= Maryland State Police =

Official state police force of the U.S. state of Maryland

Maryland Department of State Police
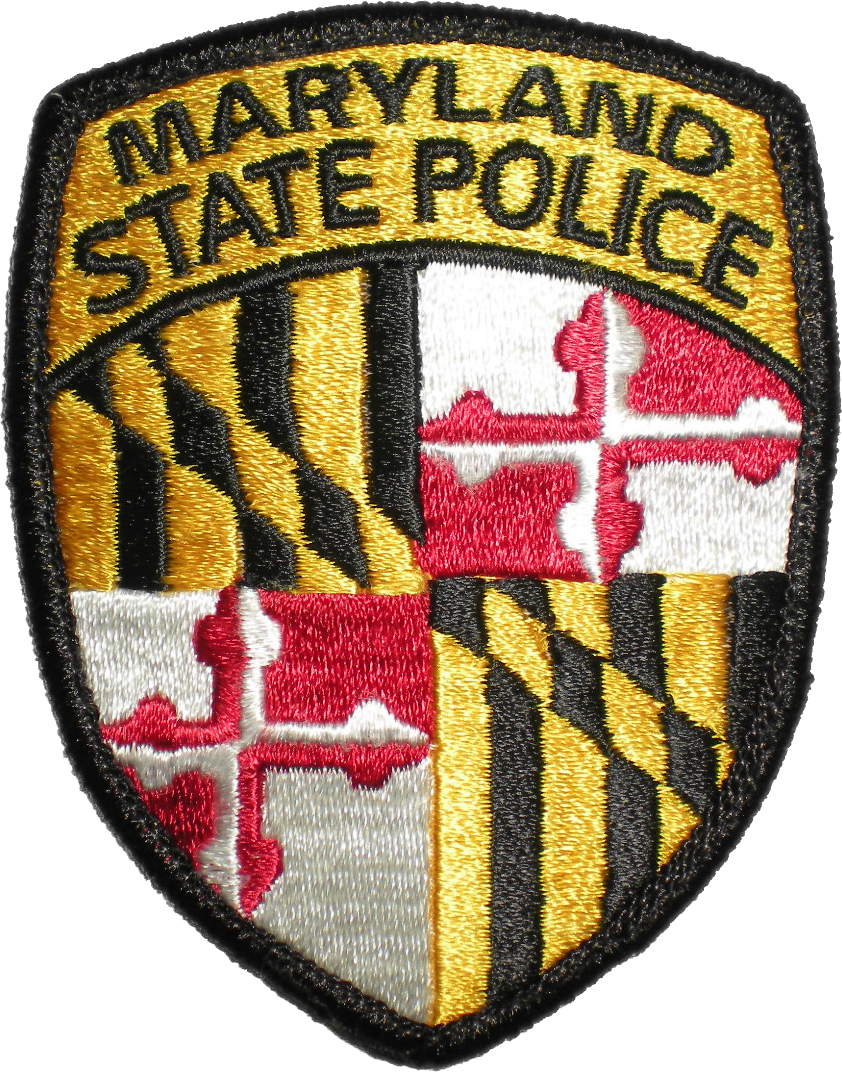
- Patch of the Maryland State Police

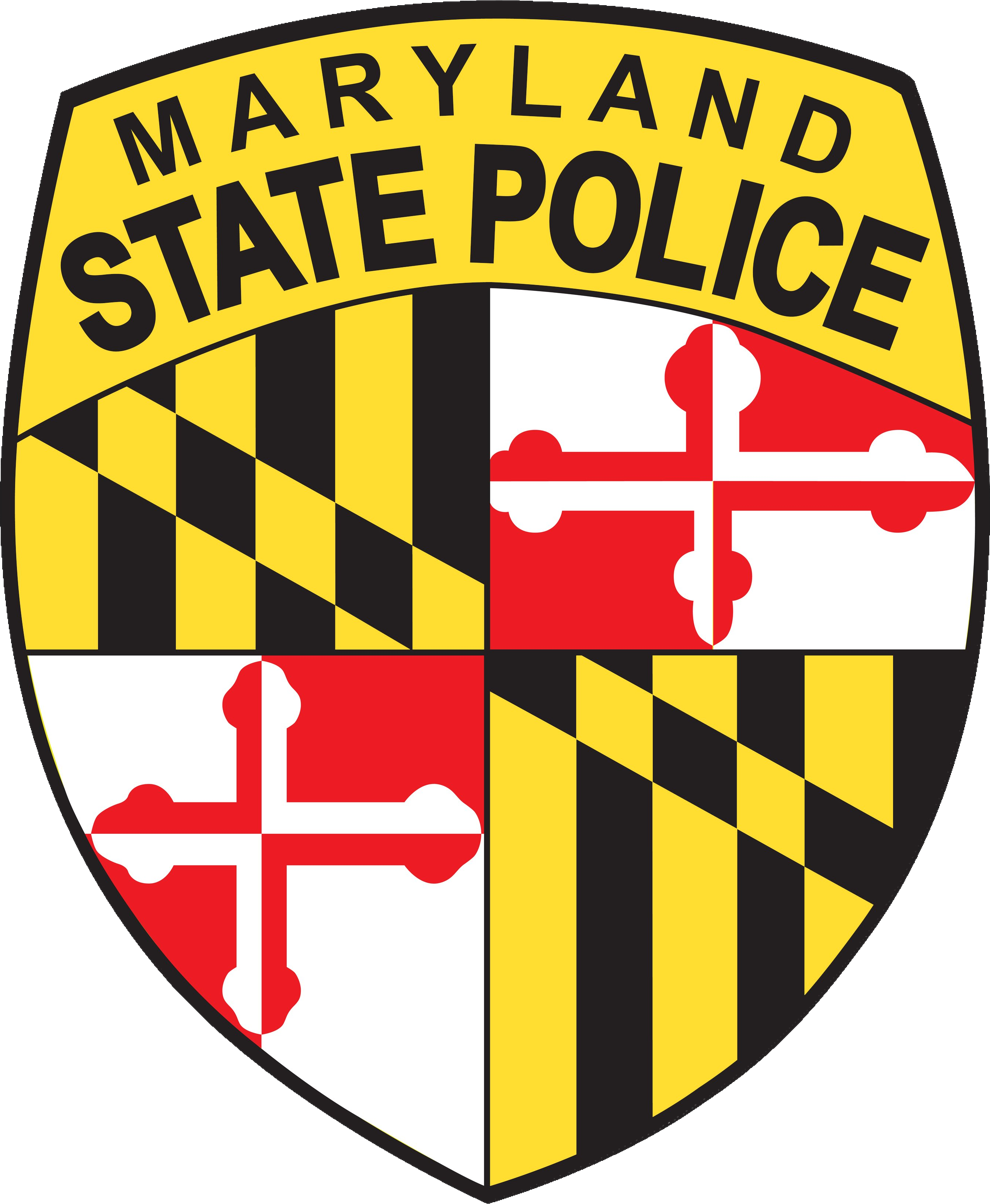
- Seal of the Maryland State Police

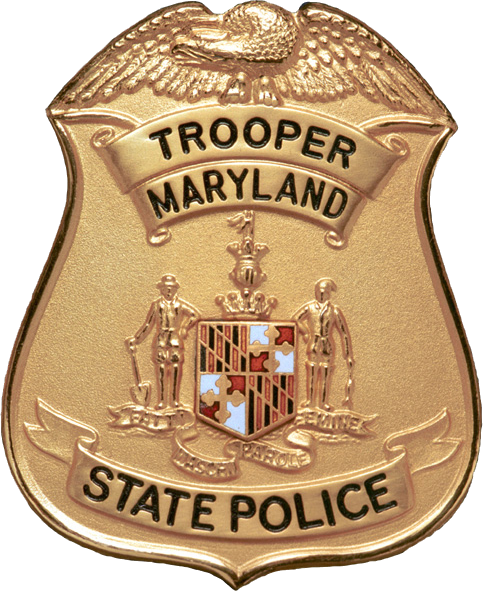
- Badge of a Maryland state trooper

- Flag of the State of Maryland
- Common name: Maryland State Police
- Abbreviation: MSP
- Motto: Maryland's Finest

Agency overview
- Formed: February 10, 1921; 105 years ago
- Employees: 2,189 (as of 2014) personnel

Jurisdictional structure
- Operations jurisdiction: Maryland, U.S.
- Maryland State Police Troops
- Area: 12,407 square miles (32,130 km^{2})
- Population: 6,045,680 (2019)
- Legal jurisdiction: State of Maryland
- Governing body: State of Maryland
- General nature: Civilian police

Operational structure
- Headquarters: 1201 Reisterstown Road, Pikesville, Maryland, U.S., 21208; 39.374948°N 76.722973°W
- Troopers: 1,474 (as of 2014)
- Civilian members: 715 (as of 2014)
- Agency executive: Colonel Michael A. Jackson, Superintendent
- Child agency: Maryland State Fire Marshal

Facilities
- Barracks: 23: Barrack A; Barrack B; Barrack C; Barrack D; Barrack E; Barrack F; Barrack G; Barrack H; Barrack I; Barrack J; Barrack L; Barrack M; Barrack N; Barrack O; Barrack P; Barrack Q; Barrack R; Barrack S; Barrack T; Barrack U; Barrack V; Barrack W; Barrack X
- Helicopters: 10
- Airplanes: 2

Website
- mdsp.maryland.gov

The Maryland State Police (MSP), officially the Maryland Department of State Police (MDSP), is the official state police force of the U.S. state of Maryland. The Maryland State Police is headquartered at 1201 Reisterstown Road in the Pikesville CDP in unincorporated Baltimore County.

== Organizational structure ==
The Maryland State Police is organized into a structure based on the United States military, composed of:

- Department of State Police (commanded by the Superintendent)
- Bureaus (commanded by a Lieutenant Colonel)
- Commands (commanded by a Major)
- Troops (commanded by a Captain)
- Divisions (commanded by a Captain or Civilian Director)
- Barracks (commanded by a Lieutenant)
- Sections (commanded by a Captain or Lieutenant, or Civilian Director)
- Units (commanded by a First Sergeant)

The Maryland State Fire Marshal is a division of the department responsible for investigating suspicious fires, explosions, and arson, as well as enforcing state fire prevention laws and regulations across Maryland.

All sworn members are organized into 1 of 4 bureaus or are assigned to the Office of the Superintendent.

=== Office of the Superintendent ===
The Office of the Superintendent includes staff and units that directly support the administrative responsibilities of the Secretary. Those units and staff report to the chief of staff. Some of the main functions of the Office of the Superintendent include:

==== Strategic Planning Command ====
The Strategic Planning Command deals with all planning within the department. The command manages the Budget and Finance Division, Government Affairs Unit, Policing Division, Staff Inspections Section, and Planning and Research Division. Within the Planning and Research Division are the Property Unit and the Accreditation Section. The Accreditation Section is responsible for authoring, reviewing, and issuance of all departmental directives. In addition, this section manages all aspects of the MSP's CALEA accreditation. The MSP received CALEA's coveted Tri-Arc award in November 2014 and is accredited in Law Enforcement, Training Academy, and Communications.

==== Criminal Intelligence Section ====
The section collects, analyzes, and coordinates the acquisition and dissemination of criminal intelligence information.

==== Department Prosecutor Section ====
The section has overall responsibility for the prosecution of all sworn disciplinary cases.

==== Executive Protection Section ====
The Executive Protection Section provides security for executive branch leaders in the State of Maryland, such as the Governor, Lieutenant Governor, Attorney General, Comptroller, and Treasurer.

==== Legislative Security Section ====
The Legislative Security Section is charged with ensuring the safety and security of the President of the Senate, Speaker of the House, and all members of the General Assembly while in session.

==== Office of Diversity, Equity and Inclusion ====
The section is responsible for ensuring compliance with the Governor's Code of Fair Practices; state and federal discrimination laws; and administering an equal employment practices program consistent with the requirements of federal and state laws governing equal employment opportunity and the State Personnel and Pensions Article.

==== Internal Affairs Division ====
The section ensures thorough and objective investigations of allegations and complaints of misconduct against employees so that proper defensive or appropriate disciplinary actions are processed.

==== Legal Counsel Section ====
The legal advisor represents the superintendent on legal issues and handles all matters referred by the superintendent.

==== Office of Media Communications ====
The office is responsible for the daily dissemination of information to the media and public, and the facilitation of internal communication from the Office of the Superintendent.

==== Vehicle Theft Prevention Council ====
Subtitle 2-702 of the Public Safety Article established the Vehicle Theft Prevention Council and Vehicle Theft Prevention Fund to assist in the prevention and deterrence of vehicle theft and related crimes, including vandalism and theft of property from vehicles.

=== Field Operations Bureau ===
The Field Operations Bureau is the most visible part of the Maryland State Police since it includes all troopers who regularly interact with the public. Within the Bureau are two commands: the Northern Command and Southern Command, which together encompass the 22 barracks. The Northern Command is divided into the Central, Northern, and Western troops and the Southern Command is divided into the Eastern, Southern, and Washington Metro troops. In addition to the traditional law enforcement services, each Barrack also provides additional services to assist the public. These services include salvage inspections and car seat safety checks.

The Automotive Safety Enforcement Division is responsible, by law, for the State's vehicle safety inspection program and all safety equipment repair orders issued by law enforcement agencies. The Division also supervises more than 1,600 inspection stations throughout the State. The Commercial Vehicle Enforcement Division operates weigh and inspection stations. It also focuses efforts on safety inspections of commercial motor vehicles traveling in the State, while also concentrating on the prevention of commercial vehicles being used as weapons of terror. The Special Operations Division includes many specialized units and teams that provide safety and rescue assistance to the citizens of Maryland.

The Field Operations Bureau is currently commanded by Lieutenant Colonel Daniel C. Pickett, Chief.

==== State Police Impaired Driving Reduction Effort ====
A component of the Field Operations Bureau, SPIDRE was launched in May 2013 and focuses on reducing alcohol related crashes in Maryland by targeting areas across the state with high crash rates involving impaired drivers. The program complements the MSP's extensive efforts to improve highway safety and help Maryland achieve the goal of zero deaths on our roadways. It is funded by the Maryland Department of Transportation's Highway Safety Office. In 2013, 152 people were killed in alcohol related crashes, accounting for 33 percent of all traffic fatalities in 2013. Using data to identify high-risk areas, the elite team of seven specially trained Maryland state troopers and their partners continue to make arrests in these concentrated areas to further reduce the number of deaths and injuries caused by impaired driving. Maryland state troopers will continue to collaborate with law enforcement partners in an effort to reduce the number of alcohol related crashes in Maryland.

=== Criminal Investigation Bureau ===
The Criminal Investigation Bureau provides the investigative functions for the department in partnership with allied law enforcement agencies. It consists of the Criminal Investigation Command and the Drug Enforcement Command. The Criminal Investigation Command includes the Criminal Enforcement Division and the Forensic Sciences Division. It will often assist local municipalities that lack extensive crime scene investigation capabilities.

The Criminal Enforcement Division is composed of special investigative groups that work on criminal enforcement, gang and firearms enforcement, computer crimes, missing children, homicides, fugitive apprehension, vehicle theft, insurance fraud and environmental crimes. The Forensic Sciences Division provides forensic laboratory analysis and expert testimony.

The Drug Enforcement Command includes the Drug Enforcement Division. Their responsibility is to lead the Maryland State Police drug control strategy by focusing on the disruption of drug trafficking at every level. Through a variety of investigative techniques, personnel attempt to identify, infiltrate, and dismantle drug organizations operating in Maryland. The bureau underwent a realignment in 2013. Barrack investigators were placed into regional commands scattered geographically throughout the state. Investigators assist allied agencies with both minor and major investigations. A primary focus of the bureau is on those crimes having an inter-jurisdictional nexus (crimes which cross local, county, or state borders).

The Criminal Investigation Bureau is currently commanded by Lieutenant Colonel Rosemary K. Chappell, Chief.

=== Support Services Bureau ===
The Support Services Bureau is divided into three commands: Logistics, Personnel, and Technology and Information Management. It provides materials and services to the Department of State Police and allied law enforcement agencies to enable them to meet their obligations and responsibilities. The Bureau's responsibilities also include managing the department's information technology and communications systems.

The Aviation Command transports critically injured citizens to trauma centers. The Command also provides aerial support for the department and allied public safety agencies, conducts search and rescue operations, and aids in criminal investigation and traffic control.

The Support Services Bureau is currently commanded by Lieutenant Colonel

==== Aviation Command ====
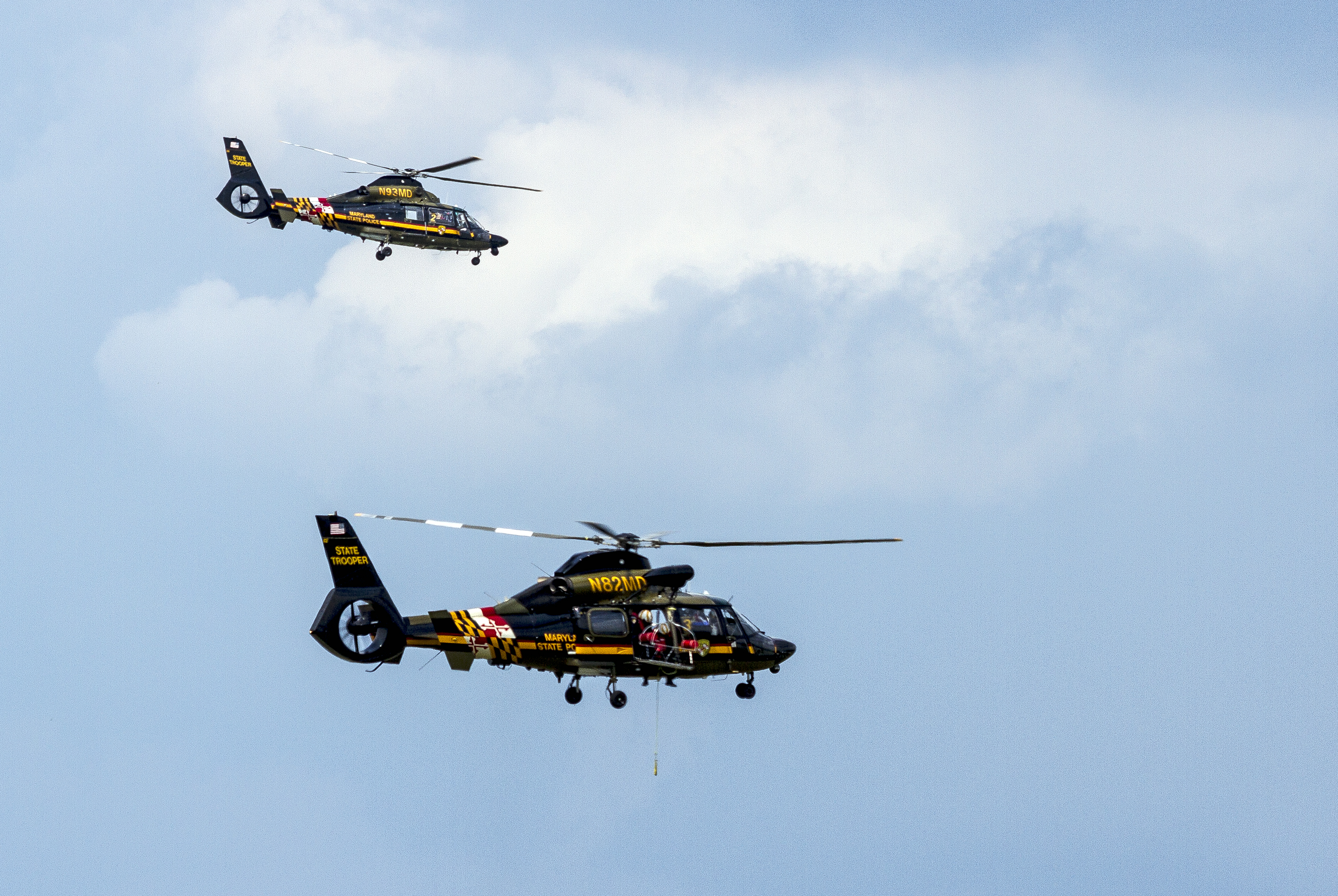
Trooper 3 (foreground) practicing hoist operations with Trooper 2 in background climbing out on a medical evacuation

The agency operates a large Aviation Command focusing on medevac operations. Aviation also supports ground units of the state and local police. Funding comes from a vehicle registration surcharge ($17.00 per vehicle per year as of 2015) collected by the Maryland Motor Vehicle Administration.

Based out of seven strategically located sections, the Aviation Command operates two types of aircraft. The command operates as a multi-role helicopter unit conducting all scene-based medevac operations in the State of Maryland. Crews on the helicopter consist of two pilots and two Trooper/Flight Paramedics. Inter-facility (hospital to hospital) remain the responsibility of private medevac providers. The only exception is neonatal transports which are still handled by the State Police through an agreement with the Maryland Neonatal Transport Team.

Call Sign	Section Name	Base Location	Status
Trooper 1	Baltimore	Martin State Airport	Operational.
Trooper 2	Washington	Joint Base Andrews	Operational.
Trooper 3	Frederick	Frederick Municipal Airport	Operational as of August 1973; originally located at the Frederick Barracks; relocated to current location shortly thereafter; Trooper 3 has completed more hoist missions than all other sections combined.
Trooper 4	Salisbury	Salisbury Regional Airport	Operational as of summer 1977 (weekends only); originally located at the Berlin Barracks; relocated to current location in summer 1978; full time operation began January 1979; operated JetRanger originally; transitioned to UH-1B in 1979; transitioned back to JetRanger in 1980; transitioned to the Dauphin in 1989.
Trooper 5	Cumberland	Cumberland Regional Airport	Operational.
Trooper 6	Easton	Easton Airport	Operational.
Trooper 7	Southern Maryland	St. Mary's County Regional Airport	Operational as of July 1987; originally located at Hangar 101 of Pax River NAS in Lexington Park operating Bell 206B; relocated to current location in 1992; transitioned to the Dauphin in 1994 and the AW-139 in 2014.
Trooper 8	Norwood	Norwood Heliport	Reserve

In addition to medevacs, the Aviation Command provides advanced search-and-rescue services and airborne hoisting in emergency situations through the deployment of highly trained crews. The command routinely assists allied law enforcement agencies by providing a robust airborne law enforcement platform through the use of advanced camera and searchlight capabilities.

On October 20, 2010, Maryland State Police awarded a $71 million contract to AgustaWestland to provide six AW139 helicopters. In 2013, the contract totaled 10 AW139s at a price of $121.7 million.

As of December 31, 2014, all seven of the Aviation Command's sections were operational using the new AW139 aircraft. All 11 of the Eurocopter Dauphins were subsequently retired and sold at auction.

Current fleet (As of May 10, 2020):

Aircraft	Type	Number	Introduced	Notes
AgustaWestland AW139	Rotary Wing	10	February 2013	Option for 2 additional aircraft not exercised; option expired June 2016
Piper PA-32-301 Saratoga	Fixed Wing	1	July 3, 2017	N9111G, Ser. No. 3206003, Mfg. 1986; replaced Cessna P210N Pressurized Centurion; not painted in MSP colors

AW139 Fleet Data:

N-Number	Serial number	Certificate Issue Date
N381MD	41276	03/14/2013
N382MD	41287	03/14/2013
N383MD	41289	03/14/2013
N384MD	41290	03/14/2013
N385MD	41291	03/14/2013
N386MD	41292	03/14/2013
N387MD	41327	06/13/2013
N388MD	41336	09/13/2013
N389MD	41338	12/19/2013
N390MD	41377	08/15/2014

Retired Fleet:

Aircraft	Type	Number	Introduced	Retired	Notes
Aerospatiale SA365N-1	Rotary Wing	12	1988	2013–2019	Hull loss crash on 9/27/2008 N92MD Trooper 2, Ser. No. 6311, with 4 souls lost (CFIT); fleet replaced by AW139s following crash of Trooper 2
Bell 206 JetRanger	Rotary Wing	Unknown	1960s	1988–1994	VFR only; First Medevac flight on 3/19/1970; Hull loss crash on 1/19/1986 with 2 souls lost operating as Trooper 3 (VFR flight into IMC conditions); Hull loss crash on 9/18/1973 with 2 souls lost (emergency landing following engine failure); Hull loss crash on 10/28/1972 with 2 souls lost (VFR flight into IMC conditions); fleet replaced by Dauphins following crash of Trooper 3; officially retired November 3, 1994
UH-1B "Huey"	Rotary Wing	Unknown	Unknown	Unknown	former military aircraft; aircraft shown in photos do not appear to have a civil registration number
Hiller UH-12E	Rotary Wing	1	Oct. 1960	1960s	
Cessna P210N Pressurized Centurion	Fixed Wing	1	Unknown	Unknown	Retired sometime after May 2016; replaced by Piper PA-32-301 Saratoga
Beechcraft B300 King Air 350	Fixed Wing	1	Unknown	Unknown	Retired sometime after May 2016

Dauphin Fleet Data:

N-Number	Serial number	Model	Entry Date or Year of Mfg	Retirement Date
N57MD	6252	Aerospatiale SA365N-1 Dauphin	1988	05/30/2018
N92MD	6311	Aerospatiale SA365N-1 Dauphin	05/07/1989	Lost 9/27/2008 with 4 souls
N93MD	6316	Aerospatiale SA365N-1 Dauphin	1989	05/04/2018
N94MD	6317	Eurocopter AS365N3	1989	03/02/2016
N95MD	6320	Eurocopter AS365N3	1989	05/04/2018
N96MD	6321	Eurocopter AS365N3	11/28/1989	03/07/2019
N97MD	6330	Eurocopter AS365N3	unknown	03/25/2018
N38MD	6335	Eurocopter AS365N3	1989	03/22/2016
N79MD	6352	Eurocopter AS365N3	09/25/1990	07/21/2016
N61MD	6462	Eurocopter AS365N2 Dauphin	1993	03/09/2016
N65MD	6464	Eurocopter AS365N2 Dauphin	unknown	03/26/2018
N82MD	6550	Eurocopter AS365N3	1998	02/11/2016

JetRanger Fleet Data (Incomplete Fleet Information):

N-Number	Serial number	Model	Certificate Issue Date	Retirement Date
N6294N	154	206A	10/06/1971	11/28/1973
N4069G	232	206A	08/01/1968	06/22/1973
N2282W	453	206A	01/26/1970	05/29/1973
N59477	1088	206B	02/27/1980(?)	04/09/1980(?)
N83108	1217	206B	08/10/1977	Unknown
N59474	1434	206B	Unknown	Unknown
N5757M	3668	206B	1980s	08/24/1995
N3189T	3814	206B	Unknown	Unknown
N45662	Unknown	206A	Unknown	Unknown
N16717	Unknown	206A	Unknown	Unknown
N49662	Unknown	206A	Unknown	Unknown
N88992	61-0718	UH-1B	Mfg 1961	Unknown

The Aviation Command was instrumental in the support of the first trauma center in the US, the R Adams Cowley Shock Trauma Center at the University of Maryland Medical Center in Baltimore.

== History ==
Until 1921, Maryland had no state-wide police force. In that year, in response to increasing crime, the Commissioner of Motor Vehicles organized a team of police officers who were given statewide jurisdiction to enforce traffic and criminal laws. They gained jurisdiction through deputization by county sheriffs. An associated plainclothes investigative unit became known as the "State Police Force."

In 1935, the Maryland State Police was established as a separate unit of state government, funded out of revenues from the Department of Commissioner of Motor Vehicles. It was granted additional statewide police powers to enforce fish, oyster, game and other conservation laws and maintain a training school. It was made part of the Department of Public Safety and Correctional Services in 1970.

In 1994, the Department of Maryland State Police was formed as a separate executive department; it was renamed the Department of State Police in 1995. Recent superintendents have included David B. Mitchell from 1995 to 2003, Ed Norris from 2003 to 2004, Thomas E. Hutchins from 2004 to 2007, Terrence Sheridan from 2007 to 2011, Marcus L. Brown from 2011 to 2015, William M. Pallozzi from 2015 to 2020, and Woodrow W. Jones III from 2020 to 2022.

Colonel Roland L. Butler Jr. was sworn in as Secretary of the Maryland Department of State Police by Governor Wes Moore on April 11, 2023. In 2024, he served as Maryland's on-scene coordinator for the Key Bridge Response Unified Command, in which he was responsible for the deployments of the Underwater Recovery Team, Aviation Command, Forensic Sciences Division and the Criminal Enforcement Division. Butler retired on October 10, 2025. Lieutenant Colonel Danile C. Pickett is serving as acting Secretary of the Maryland Department of State Police until his successor, Michael Jackson, is confirmed by the Maryland Senate.

In the history of the force, forty-three state troopers have been killed in the line of duty.

== Jurisdiction ==
The Maryland State Police has jurisdiction throughout Maryland and may, in its discretion or at the request of any municipal agency, or when ordered by the Governor of Maryland, exercise and enforce statewide laws without regard to jurisdiction within the boundaries of the State of Maryland. Otherwise, except under certain conditions as defined by statute, the agency does not enforce criminal laws within the jurisdiction of those incorporated municipalities which have their own police force.

The department also has the authority and jurisdiction to investigate allegations of police corruption concerning any municipal agency within the state. The department also enforces controlled substance laws throughout the state.

== Uniform and equipment ==
The police uniform has remained the same since 1951. The standard uniform consists of olive pants with a black stripe down the side, a tan colored button-up shirt is worn, with long sleeves in winter and short sleeves in summer. A black tie is worn with the long-sleeve shirt. Some also wear black sweaters in cold weather. Class A uniforms consist of a dress blouse and Sam Browne belt. The ranks of trooper first class, corporal, sergeant, and first sergeant wear yellow chevrons showing their rank on both sleeves. Members of certain specialized units wear a military camouflage work uniform.

A felt Stetson hat is worn in the winter months with a long sleeve shirt and tie, and a straw Stetson is worn in the summer months with the short sleeve shirt.

Maryland State Police troopers are issued the Glock 17 chambered in 9mm, replacing the Glock 22 and the Beretta Px4 Storm, which were both chambered in .40 S&W. The Remington 870 is the standard issue patrol shotgun. Qualified troopers are also issued the LWRC semi-automatic rifle.

== Vehicles ==
Troopers patrol in marked or unmarked vehicles. Early marked patrol units were olive green with black fenders. Beginning in 1972, vehicles (including helicopters) were painted yellow. Beginning in about 1984 new vehicles were painted tan with black and olive side stripes from front to rear. In approximately 1996, the agency changed back to the historic colors, and painted vehicles with most horizontal surfaces olive green and most vertical surfaces black.

MSP currently operates a fleet consisting of the Ford Police Interceptor Utility, Ford Police Interceptor Sedan, Chevrolet Caprice 9C1, and Chevrolet Tahoe PPV, with the Ford Crown Victoria Police Interceptor being phased out of service. Most newer vehicles are painted in the traditional green over black paint schemes, however, some are painted all black with traditional MSP lettering. All marked patrol vehicles contain the Maryland State Police Shield on both the driver and passenger door as well as "State Trooper" decals on the fenders and rear of the vehicle. Trooper's vehicles are not equipped with prisoner cages. Prisoners, by policy, are transported in the front seat.

Most vehicles assigned to patrol functions are equipped with mounted radar units, in-car mobile data terminals, printers, and barcode scanners that allow troopers to access various law enforcement databases as well as provide the hardware support for the MSP's Etix electronic citation program. This setup enables troopers to spend more time on patrol as they are able to complete reports through an internet-based computer-aided dispatch / report management system.

== Training ==
The Maryland State Police Training Academy is in Sykesville, Maryland, along with the Maryland Police and Correctional Training Commission. The academy is live-in and consists of twenty-six weeks of basic instruction.

Candidates take college-level academic classes for which they receive 45 college credits. Training includes instruction in the use of the agency's firearms as well as in criminal law, motor vehicle law and emergency vehicle operation. Vehicle training is conducted on the training commission's course.

Upon completion of training, troopers are assigned to one of twenty-three barracks located around Maryland. There troopers will complete an additional eight weeks of field training under the supervision of a Field Training Trooper (FTT).

== Barracks ==
Barrack ID	Location	Area served
Barrack A	Waterloo	Howard County
Barrack B	Frederick	Frederick County
Barrack C	Cumberland	Allegany County
Barrack D	Bel Air	Harford County
Barrack E	Salisbury	Wicomico County
Barrack F	North East	Cecil County
Barrack G	Westminster	Carroll County
Barrack H	La Plata	Charles County
Barrack I	Easton	Caroline County, Dorchester County, Talbot County
Barrack J	Annapolis	Anne Arundel County
Barrack L	Forestville	Prince George's County (south of U.S. 50)
Barrack M	JFK Memorial Highway	Interstate 95 in Cecil County, Harford County, Baltimore County
Barrack N	Rockville	Montgomery County
Barrack O	Hagerstown	Washington County
Barrack P	Glen Burnie	Anne Arundel County
Barrack Q	College Park	Prince George's County (north of and including U.S. 50)
Barrack R	Golden Ring	Baltimore County
Barrack S	Centreville	Kent County, Queen Anne's County
Barrack T	Leonardtown	St. Mary's County
Barrack U	Prince Frederick	Calvert County
Barrack V	Berlin	Worcester County
Barrack W	McHenry	Garrett County
Barrack X	Princess Anne	Somerset County

== Rank structure ==
The Maryland State Police is a paramilitary organization with a rank structure modeled after the United States military. The ranks of corporal through captain are based on promotional testing; majors and above are appointed by the superintendent.

The Maryland State Police rank structure is as listed:

Rank	Insignia	Description
Colonel/Superintendent		The Rank Of Colonel is held by the Superintendent of the Maryland State Police.He is the Secretary of the Department of State Police and a member of the governor's cabinet.
Lieutenant Colonel		There are three officers with the rank of Lieutenant Colonel.Each is responsible for overseeing one of the three bureaus within the state police.
Major		Majors are responsible for a command within the state police.
Captain		The specific responsibilities of a captain vary depending upon where they are assigned within the agency. For example, a captain may be a troop commander in the Field Operations Bureau or a division commander in one of the other bureaus.
Lieutenant		A lieutenant is the commander of each barrack. Other Lieutenants may command a unit.
First Sergeant		First sergeants are assistant barrack commanders or may perform administrative functions in other areas.
Detective Sergeant		Detective sergeants are in charge of all criminal investigations at a barracks, or may be assigned to other investigative functions.
Sergeant		Sergeants act as shift commanders or duty officers.
Corporal		Corporals are the first-line supervisors and are usually assigned as road supervisors within barracks. In the absence of a sergeant, they may act as the duty officer.
Master Trooper		Troopers who complete 15 years of satisfactory or exceptional service are promoted to the rank of Master Trooper.
Senior Trooper		Troopers who complete 10 years of satisfactory or exceptional service are promoted to the rank of Senior Trooper.
Trooper First Class		Troopers who complete three years of satisfactory or exceptional service are promoted to the rank of TFC.
Trooper		Candidates successfully completing the academy and field training are appointed as troopers.

== Demographics ==
- Male: 90%
- Female: 10%
- White: 78%
- African-American/Black: 15%
- Hispanic: 2%
- Asian: 1%

== Specialized units ==
- Homeland Security and Intelligence Division (HSID) – Focuses on intelligence gathering and counterterrorism efforts.
- Criminal Enforcement Division (CED) – Conducts investigations into major crimes and supports law enforcement operations.
- Executive Protection – Provides security for the Governor and other high-ranking officials.
- S.T.A.T.E. Team – The department's SWAT unit, handling high-risk tactical operations including hostage situations and terrorism-related incidents. S.T.A.T.E stands for "Special Tactical Assault Team Element".
- Aviation Command – Operates helicopters and fixed-wing aircraft for law enforcement and emergency services.
- D.A.R.E. – Drug Abuse Resistance Education program, delivering drug education to youth.
- Accident Reconstruction – Investigates serious traffic collisions to determine causes and responsibilities.
- Canine Unit (K9) – Utilizes trained dogs for drug detection, tracking, and apprehension.
- Crime Lab – Provides forensic analysis to support criminal investigations.
- Media Communications – Manages public information and media relations.
- Computer Crimes Unit – Investigates cybercrimes and digital offenses.
- Automotive Safety Enforcement Division – Enforces vehicle safety laws and regulations.
- Police Academy / Training Division – Provides training and development for MSP personnel.
- Motorcycle Unit – Troopers patrol using motorcycles and all-terrain vehicles (ATVs).
- Licensing Division – Oversees the issuance of licenses and permits.
- Commercial Vehicle Enforcement Division – Enforces laws related to commercial vehicle operations.
- Underwater Recovery Team (MSP URT) – Specializes in underwater search and recovery operations.

== Trooper 2 crash ==
On the night of September 27, 2008, around 11:37 PM, Maryland State Police (MSP) helicopter Trooper 2, a Eurocopter AS 365N1 Dauphin (N92MD), crashed in Walker Mill Regional Park, District Heights, Maryland, during a medical evacuation mission.

=== Crew and casualties ===
Four of the five people aboard were killed:

- Pilot Stephen H. Bunker (retired Corporal)
- Trooper First Class Mickey C. Lippy (paramedic)
- EMT Tonya M. Mallard (Waldorf Volunteer Fire Department)
- Ashley J. Younger, one of the two patients

The second patient, Jordan A. Wells, survived with serious injuries.

=== Incident ===
The helicopter encountered instrument meteorological conditions (IMC) en route and diverted to Andrews Air Force Base to transfer patients. Shortly before midnight, it crashed several miles short of the runway in Walker Mill Regional Park.

=== Investigation ===
The National Transportation Safety Board (NTSB) determined the probable cause of the crash was the pilot's attempt to regain visual conditions by performing a rapid descent and failure to arrest the descent at the minimum descent altitude during a non-precision approach.

=== Aftermath ===
- All MSP Aviation Division aircraft were grounded until the investigation was completed, with allied agencies providing statewide coverage.
- Memorials were established in Walker Mill Regional Park to honor the fallen personnel.
- The crash prompted fleet upgrades, including the transition to AW139 helicopters to improve safety and operational capabilities.

== Controversies ==
=== Former superintendents (secretaries) of state police ===
Col. Edward T. Norris (Secretary of State Police 2003) pled guilty to federal corruption and tax charges. Federal prosecutors said he used the money, in part, to pay for extramarital encounters with six women. He served 6 months in federal prison, followed by three years of supervised probation and was ordered to perform 500 hours of community service.

Col. Marcus L. Brown (Secretary of State Police 2011–2015) after leaving the Maryland State Police, was appointed acting head of the Pennsylvania State Police by Pennsylvania Governor Tom Wolf. Brown became the subject of a Hampden Township, PA Police misdemeanor theft investigation after Brown was caught on video attempting to remove opponents' political signs. Many Republican senators expressed concern, "the incident calls into question Brown's judgment and ability to handle controversy and difficult situations within the bounds of the law."

Brown apologized, admitting, he "made a mistake in judgment", adding his actions didn't reflect well on himself or the state police. Brown lost his appointment for commissioner of the Pennsylvania State Police confirmation vote, mostly along party lines, and subsequently withdrew his name from consideration. Gov. Tom Wolf recalled Brown's nomination June 8, 2015, and later appointed him to another position that didn't require confirmation.

=== Racial profiling ===
In 1998 several individual plaintiffs, were joined by the NAACP, and the ACLU in filing a federal lawsuit alleging Maryland State Troopers were continuing to engage in racial profiling and discrimination. In 2003, the Maryland State Police entered into a Consent Decree with the US Department of Justice to resolve major portions of the case. The consent decree required, among other things; implementation of a policy against racial profiling, audio visual recording of traffic stops and searches, a 24-hour toll free hotline to receive discrimination complaints, and increased training.

In 2008 the State Police finally settled what had become known as the "driving while black" case, by agreeing to pay $300,000 in damages and legal costs, and up to $100,000 to retain an independent consultant to implement policy and practices changes.

=== Domestic Spying ===
In 2008, it was revealed through Freedom of Information Act requests that the Maryland State Police had been engaged in domestic spying of anti-war, anti-death penalty and environmental activists, and classified 53 of them as "terrorists," although none of them committed a violent crime. The police admitted that there was never any evidence linking these individuals with any intention to commit any acts of violence. Among those listed as terrorists were two Roman Catholic nuns living in Baltimore.

=== Search tactics questioned ===
On the morning of March 11, 2014, officers from the Montgomery County Police Department, Maryland State Police, Rockville City Police, and Prince George's County Police acting on a tip set up a roadblock on across all 12-lanes on Interstate 270 and walked car to car with pistols, shotguns and semiautomatic rifles searching for three armed bank robbery suspects. The incident brought hundreds of cars and thousands of motorists on the interstate to a standstill for 45-minutes as dozens of police officers conducted vehicle-to-vehicle searches. The search tactics came into question, with reports of officers walking down I-270 between stopped cars with guns drawn, telling people to get back in their vehicles, and open their trunks. One woman was reportedly shouted at by police with weapons drawn after she'd opened her car door to throw up, having gotten carsick from sitting in traffic. MCPD Chief Manger defended the incident. Don Troop, a motorist in the traffic, told the Washington Post that a group of officers made its way to his car and other cars around him. "They were just walking along saying: "Pop the trunk! Pop the trunk!" Troop said he overheard a man in a truck next to him call out to another motorist: "The police are looking for bank robbers." A short time later, about nine officers approached his car — including state police in tan uniforms, county police in dark uniforms and at least one plainclothes officer wearing a yellow tie. Among their commands to motorists that Troop heard: "Stay in your car." "Pop the trunk." "Get your hands on the steering wheel. Get you hands up where we can see them." Cpl. Aaron Smith, a pilot flying a Prince George's County helicopter dispatched to assist stated "We saw that they were searching traffic and going vehicle to vehicle." Montgomery County Police spokesman Captain Paul Starks described the incident as a "systematic check of trunks and rear hitches" of detained vehicles. Three suspects were identified in the traffic and taken into custody without incident. One handgun and bank currency were recovered. No legal action was filed against any police department due to the incident.

== See also ==
- List of law enforcement agencies in Maryland
- State Police (United States)
- State Patrol
- Highway Patrol
- Maryland State Police Museum - Pikesville, Maryland
