= Mexico, Allegany County, Maryland =

Unincorporated community in Maryland, United States

Mexico, Maryland
- Unincorporated community
- Location within the State of Maryland Mexico, Maryland (the United States)
- Coordinates: 39°36′13″N 78°44′34″W
- Country: United States
- State: Maryland
- County: Allegany
- Elevation: 604 ft (184 m)
- Time zone: UTC-5 (Eastern (EST))
  - Summer (DST): UTC-4 (EDT)
- GNIS feature ID: 1713487

Mexico is an unincorporated community, in Allegany County, Maryland, United States.
