= Howard County Department of Fire and Rescue Services =

American municipal fire department

Operational area
- Country: United States
- State: Maryland
- County: Howard

Agency overview
- Employees: ~900
- Staffing: Career & Volunteer
- Fire chief: Louis Winston
- EMS level: ALS

Facilities and equipment
- Battalions: 3
- Stations: 14
- Engines: 25
- Trucks: 3
- Platforms: 4
- Squads: 4
- Ambulances: 19
- Tenders: 5
- HAZMAT: 1

Website
- Official website

The Howard County Department of Fire and Rescue Services provides fire protection, rescue, and emergency medical services to Howard County, Maryland.

== History ==
On July 10, 1888, Ellicott City citizens formed The Volunteer Fire Company of Ellicott City No. 1. On August 24, 1888, authorization was granted to purchase a hand-drawn ladder wagon from the Charles T. Holloway Company, Baltimore, Maryland. The wagon arrived on October 5, 1888, and was based in the old foundry. The first firehouse built in Ellicott City was constructed in 1896 with a cupola to house a firebell donated by the B&O railroad to summon firemen.

In 1924, the Howard County Volunteer Fireman's Association was formed operating out of a new combination firehouse and transit terminal on Main street in Ellicott City with an $10,500 600 gallon American LaFrance triple combination engine. Insurance agent Benjamin Mellor became the first fire chief serving until 1934. In April 1940, a new fire station was dedicated in Ellicott City.

On 18 April 1959, the Central Alarm went into operation in an office above the Ellicott City Jail.

In 1991, the department implemented a customer service program, more commonly found in the commercial industry. In 1996, Fire Chief Joseph Herr is replaced by Bill Goddard. In 2014 the criteria for contingent firefighters that supplement volunteer stations without benefits changed to require the same qualifications as career staff, promoting the departure of 33 of 34 contingent staff primarily from Lisbon and West Friendship.

== Stations & Apparatus ==
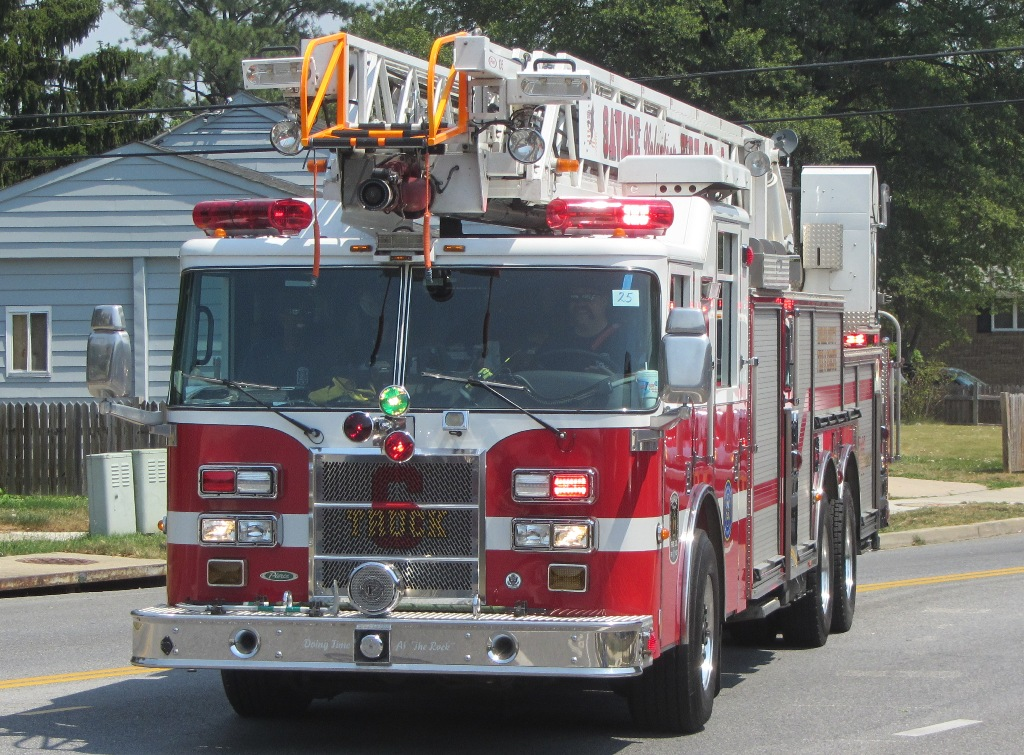
Truck 6

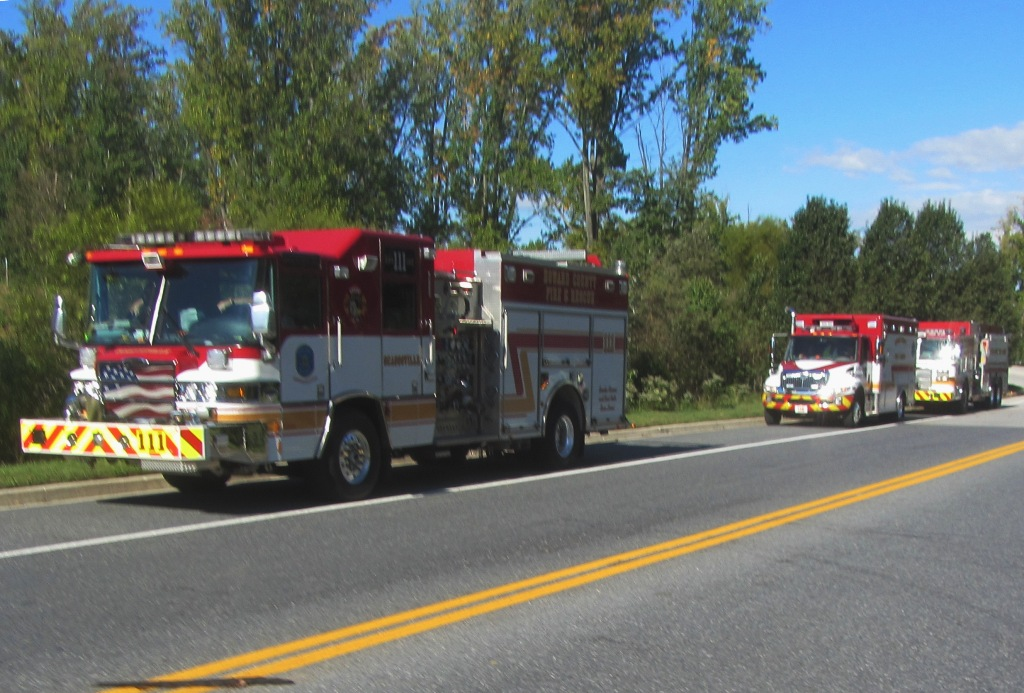
Engine 111

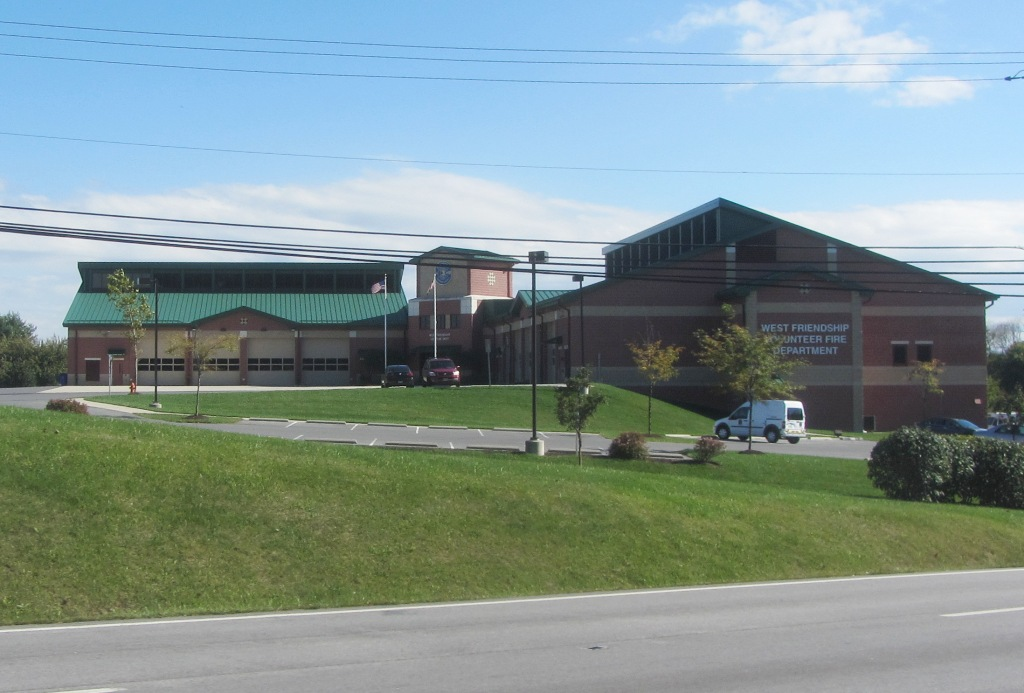
Station 3 West Friendship VFD 12535 Old Frederick Road

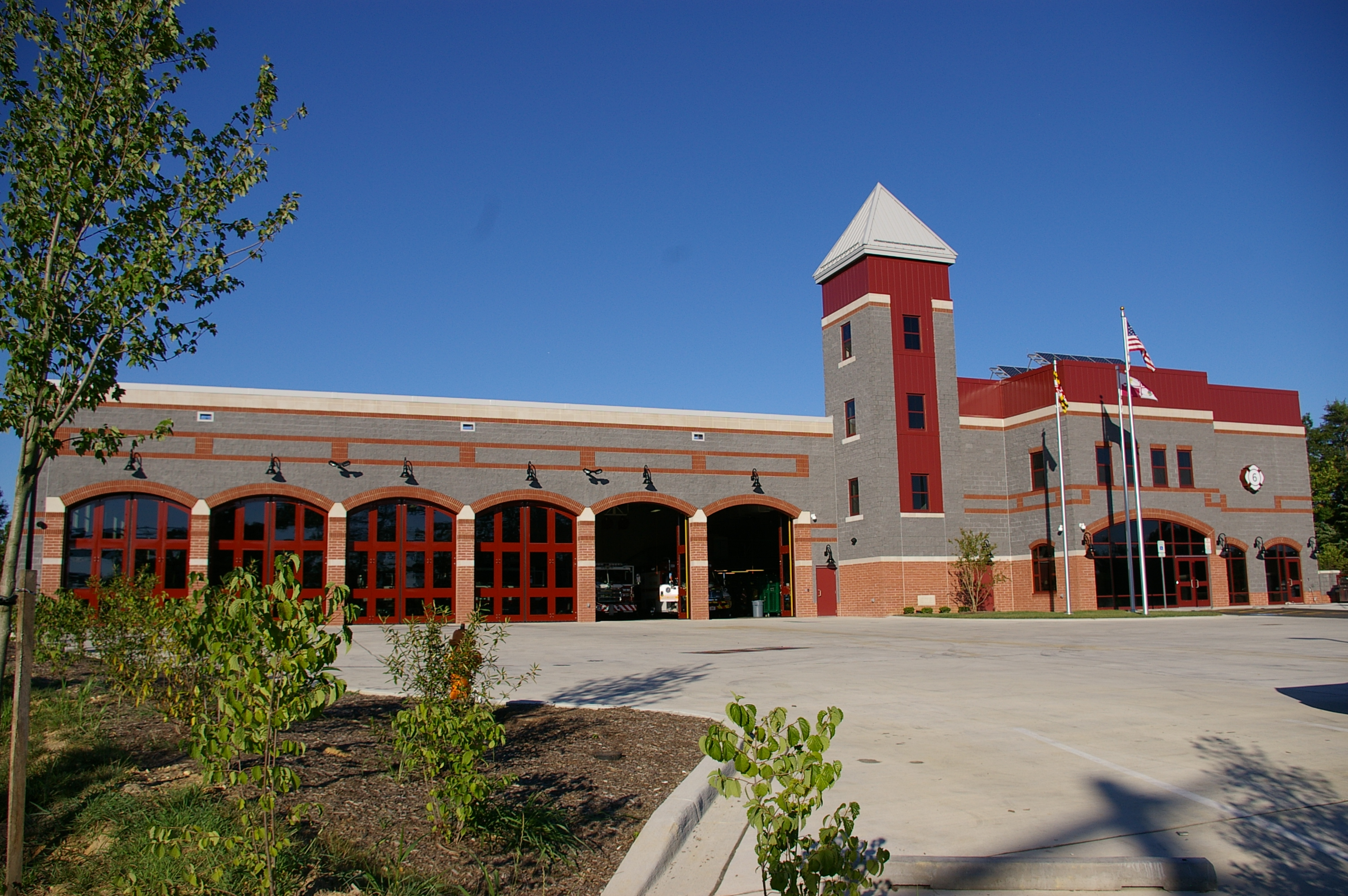
Station 6 Savage Volunteer Fire Company 8521 Corridor Road

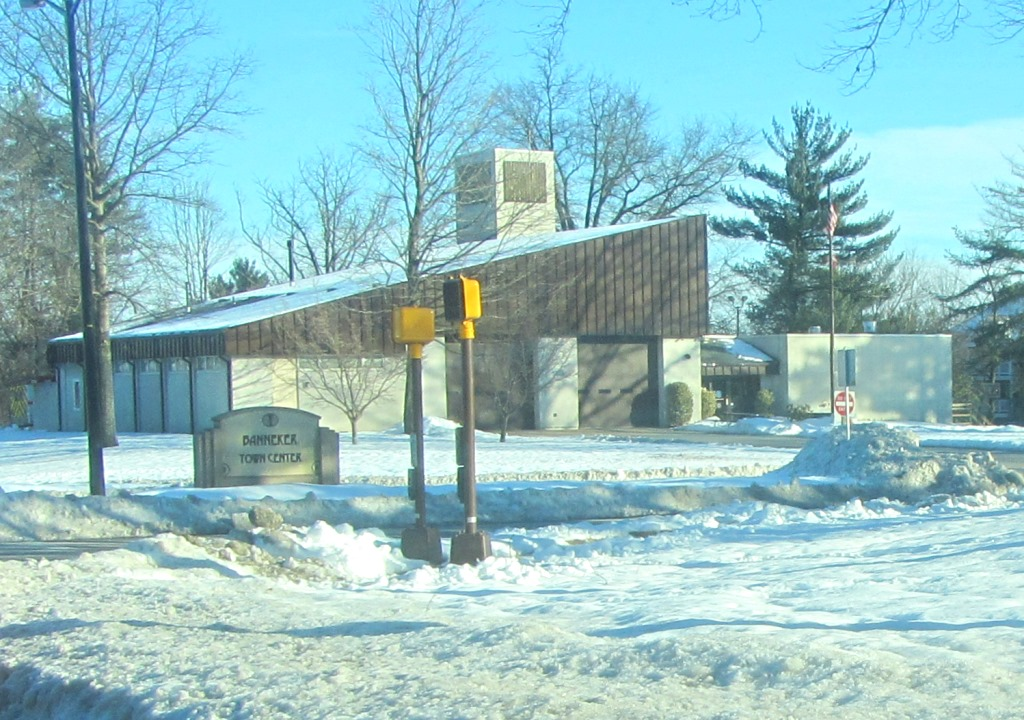
Station 7 5815 Banneker Road Columbia, Maryland

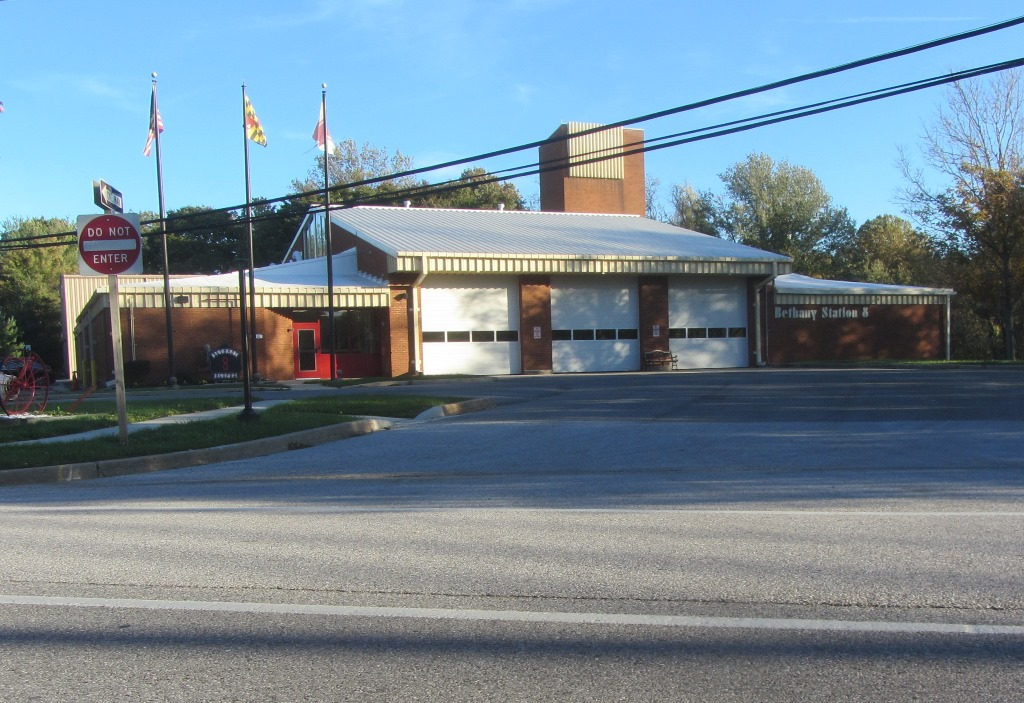
Bethany Station 8 9601 Old Frederick Road

There are a total of 14 stations under the umbrella of the department, 7 of which are fully county staffed. The remaining 7 are career/volunteer combination stations. These firehouses are staffed with a combination of both paid personnel and volunteers. The volunteer departments, which are marked below with a V are as follows:

- Elkridge Volunteer Fire Department - Station 1
- Ellicott City Volunteer Fire Department - Stations 2 & 8
- West Friendship Volunteer Fire Department - Station 3
- Lisbon Volunteer Fire Company - Station 4
- Fifth District Volunteer Fire Department Clarksville - Station 5
- Savage Volunteer Fire Department - Station 6

Fire Station Number	City	Engine Companies or Engine-Tanker Company	Squad Company, Tower Company, Truck Company or Rescue Engine Company	Paramedic, Ambulance or EMS Units	Brush Units	Chief Units	Special Units
1V	Elkridge	Engine 11, Engine 12	Tower 1	Paramedic 15; Ambulance 16	Brush 18	Chief 1, Chief 1A, Chief 1B	Utility 1, Utility 1A, Utility 1B, ATV1S, ATV1M
2V	Ellicott City	Engine 21, Engine 22	Tower 2 Truck 21	Paramedic 25; Ambulance 26	Brush 27	Battalion Chief 2, Chief 2, Chief 2A, Chief 2B	Utility 2, Utility 2A, Utility 2B, Water rescue 2, Boat 2
3V	West Friendship	Engine 31, Engine 32	Tower 3	Paramedic 35; Ambulance 36	Brush 37, Brush 38	Chief 3, Chief 3A, Chief 3B	Tankers 3, Tanker 34
4V	Lisbon	Engine 41, Engine 42, Engine-Tanker 44	Rescue Engine 4	Paramedic 45, Ambulance 46	Brush 47, Brush 48	Chief 4, Chief 4A, Chief 4B	Utility 4, Utility 4A, Utility 4B
5V	Clarksville	Engine 51, Engine 52		Paramedic 55; Paramedic 56	Brush 58		Tanker 5, Utility 5, Dive 5, Boat 5, Bariatric 5
6V	Savage	Engine 61, Engine 62	Truck 6, Squad 6	Paramedic 65; Ambulance 66 EMS 1	Brush 68	Chief 6, Chief 6A, Chief 6B	Utility 6, Canteen 6
7	Columbia	Engine 71	Truck 7	Paramedic 75, Ambulance 76			Utility 7
8V	Bethany	Engine 81, Engine 82		Paramedic 85, Ambulance 86, EMS 2	Brush 87	Chief 8B	Air Unit 17, Utility 8, MAB 13, MAB Support Trailer
9	Long Reach	Engine 91		Paramedic 95, Ambulance 96	Brush 97		Safety 1, Utility 9, Public Education Unit
10	Rivers Park	Engine 101	Tower 10	Paramedic 105, Reserve Ambulance 106		Special Operations Battalion Chief 10	Transport 10, Transport 12, Utility 10, Water Rescue 10, Boat 10, ATV10
11	Scaggsville	Engine 111		Paramedic 115			Tanker 11, Boat 11, Decon 13, Utility 11
12	Waterloo	Engine 121		Paramedic 125	Brush 128	Battalion Chief 1	
13	Glenwood	Engine 131		Paramedic 135	Brush 137	EMS/Battalion Chief 3	Tanker 13, Utility 13
14	Merriweather	Engine 141		Paramedic 145			Utility 14, ATV14
