= 2015 Baltimore protests =

Protests against police brutality in Baltimore, Maryland

2015 Baltimore protests and riots
- Part of the Black Lives Matter movement and reactions to the Killing of Freddie Gray
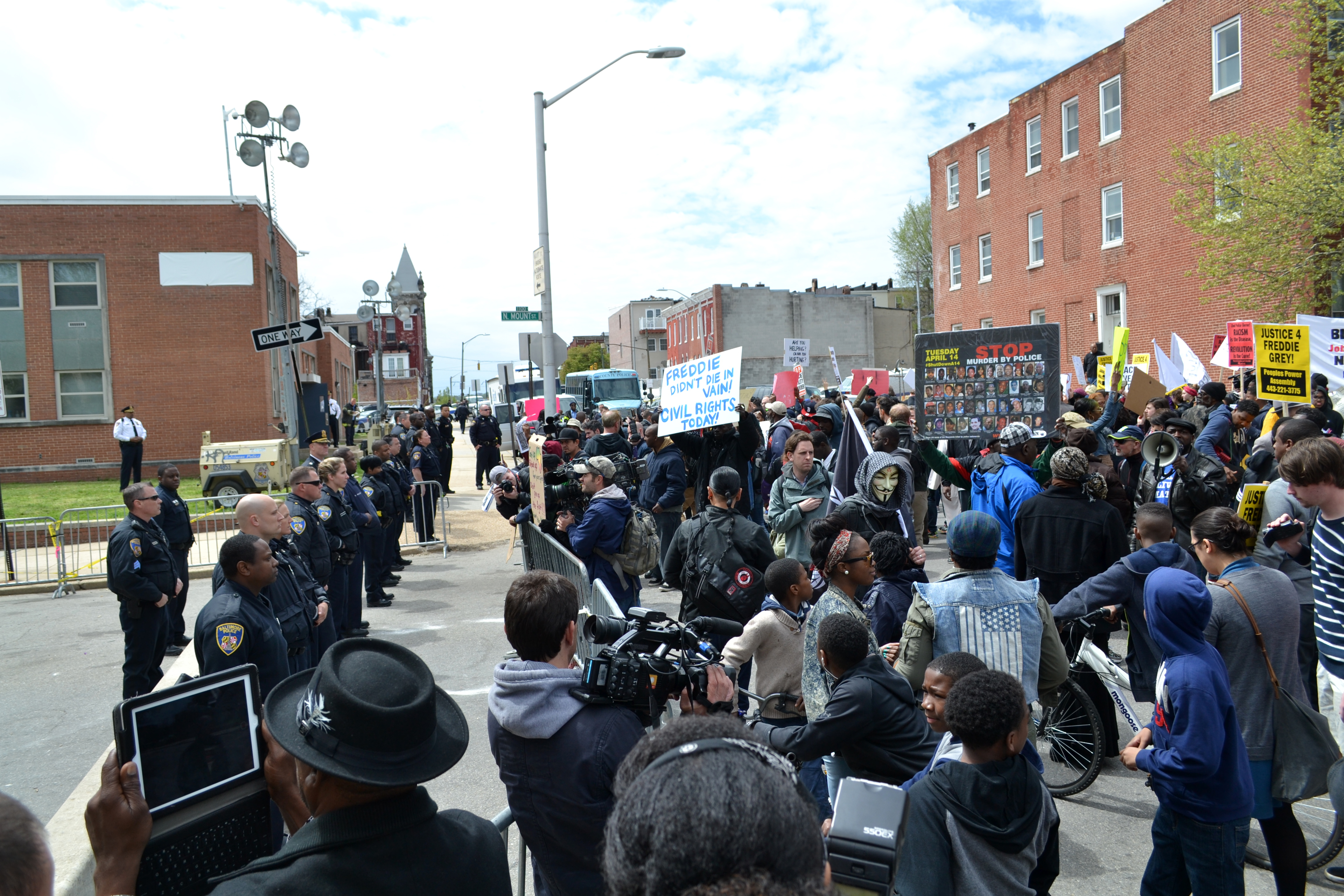
- Protesters demonstrating at the Baltimore Police Department's Western District building.
- Location: Baltimore, Maryland, U.S. 39.290860°N 76.611024°W
- Caused by: The hospitalization and death of Freddie Gray
- Goals: Legal prosecution of those allegedly responsible for Gray's death; an end to police brutality.
- Methods: Protests, rioting, arson, vandalism
- Status: Ended, movement still active.
- Result: 350+ businesses and homes damaged

Parties
Maryland; Baltimore Police Department; Baltimore County Police Department; Baltimore City Sheriff's Office; Maryland Army National Guard; Maryland Air National Guard; Maryland Defense Force; Maryland State Police; Howard County Police Department; Harford County Sheriff's Office; Prince George's County Police Department; Anne Arundel County Police Department; Montgomery County Police Department; Maryland Transit Administration Police; Maryland Transportation Authority Police; Ocean City Police Department; Bel Air Police Department; Aberdeen Police Department; Montgomery County Sheriff's Office; Frederick Police Department; New Jersey; New Jersey State Police; Pennsylvania; Pennsylvania State Police	Black Lives Matter protesters

Lead figures
Mayor Stephanie Rawlings-Blake; Commissioner Anthony Batts, BCPD; Governor Larry Hogan	Unknown

Number
1,000+ police; 2,500 National Guard	

Injuries and arrests
- Injuries: 113 police officers injured, 2 people shot. One fire victim in critical condition.
- Arrested: 486
- Charged: Greg Bailey: charged with obstructing firefighting operations, malicious destruction of property and reckless endangerment.
- State of emergency declared effective on April 27; rescinded May 6. A mandatory curfew was ordered beginning April 28 and ended May 3.

On April 12, 2015, Baltimore Police Department officers arrested Freddie Gray, a 25-year-old African American resident of Baltimore, Maryland. Gray's neck and spine were injured while he was in a police vehicle and he went into a coma. On April 18, protests occurred in front of the Western district police station. Gray died on April 19.

Further protests were organized after Gray's death became public knowledge, amid the police department's continuing inability to adequately or consistently explain the events following the arrest and the injuries. Spontaneous protests started after the funeral service, although several included violent elements. Civil unrest continued with at least twenty police officers injured, at least 250 people arrested, 285 to 350 businesses damaged, 150 vehicle fires, 60 structure fires, 27 drugstores looted, thousands of police and Maryland National Guard troops deployed, and with a state of emergency declared in the city limits of Baltimore. The state of emergency was lifted on May 6. The series of protests took place against a historical backdrop of racial and poverty issues in Baltimore.

On May 1, 2015, Gray's death was ruled by the medical examiner to be a homicide. Six officers were charged with various offenses, including second-degree murder, in connection with Gray's death. Three officers were subsequently acquitted; in July 2016, following the acquittals, Baltimore City State's Attorney Marilyn Mosby dropped charges against the remaining three officers.

== Events ==
=== April 12: Gray's arrest ===
On April 12, 2015, Freddie Carlos Gray Jr., a 25-year-old African-American man, was arrested by the Baltimore City Police Department for possession of a "switchblade," in the 1700 block of Presbury Street in the Sandtown-Winchester neighbourhood. Two weeks later, State's Attorney Marilyn Mosby stated that Gray had been carrying a legal pocketknife, not an illegal switchblade as alleged by police. However, court opinions later recognized the knife as being a spring-assisted knife and that the police officers correctly identified it as illegal under the Baltimore City Code, including in an officers' defamation suit filed against Mosby. Gray was seen to be in good health at the time of the arrest.

While being transported in a police van, Gray sustained injuries to his neck, including his vocal box and spinal cord. He fell into a coma and was taken to a trauma center. The BCPD could not immediately account for the injuries and released contradictory and inconsistent information regarding the timeline of the arrest, transportation and whether Gray had received appropriately prompt medical treatment. On May 23, 2016, officer Edward Nero was found not guilty of all charges against him in connection with the death of Freddie Gray. Shortly after that, the remaining officers who had not yet stood trial had all charges against them dropped.

=== April 18–24: Protests begin ===
On April 18, 2015, immediately outside the Western District police station, hundreds of Baltimore citizens protested against the apparent mistreatment of Freddie Gray as well against inadequate and inconsistent information on police actions during the arrest and transport. Gray died at approximately 7am on April 19, 2015. Later that day, in response to Gray's death, Baltimore City Police Commissioner, Anthony Batts said, "I extend my deepest sympathies to his family" while also saying, "All Lives Matter" in a nod to the "Black Lives Matter" mantra shouted at protests.

Protests continued during six nights in Baltimore's streets. On April 21, 2015, the Baltimore City Police Department released the identities of the six officers involved in Gray's arrest. That evening, protesters marched from the site of Gray's arrest to the Western District police station. On April 23, two people were arrested. Tensions flared, but according to the Baltimore City Police Department, the remaining protesters that day were peaceful. On April 24, a coalition of organizations including the ACLU, the NAACP, CASA de Maryland, and Leaders of a Beautiful Struggle requested Governor Larry Hogan to act and address issues of police brutality.

=== April 25: Violence escalates ===
Rioters breaking the windows of a McDonald's restaurant on the evening of April 25, 2015

On April 25, 2015, protests were organized in downtown Baltimore. Protesters marched from the Baltimore City Hall to the Inner Harbor. After the final stage of the official protest event, some people became violent, damaging at least five police vehicles and pelting police with rocks. Near Oriole Park at Camden Yards, some groups of violent protesters also smashed storefronts and fought with baseball fans arriving at the stadium for a scheduled game between the Baltimore Orioles and the Boston Red Sox. As a result of the violence, those attending the baseball game were forced to remain inside the stadium for their safety. At least 34 people were arrested during the riots, and six police officers were injured.

J.M. Giordano, a photographer for Baltimore City Paper, was taking pictures of the protest when he was "swarmed" and beaten by two police officers in riot gear. Sait Serkan Gurbuz, a Reuters photographer with visible press credentials, who photographed the scuffle from a public sidewalk, was tackled, handcuffed and walked to the Western District station. He was cited for failure to obey and later released. Subsequently, City Paper published a video on its website documenting the violence.

During a press conference, Baltimore mayor Stephanie Rawlings-Blake said, "most protesters were respectful but a small group of agitators intervened". She also stated that "It's a very delicate balancing act. Because while we try to make sure that they were protected from the cars and other things that were going on, we also gave those who wished to destroy space to do that as well. And we worked very hard to keep that balance and to put ourselves in the best position to de-escalate." The phrase "we also gave those who wished to destroy space to do that as well" was interpreted by some conservative-leaning news sources as an indication that the mayor was giving permission to protesters to destroy property.

Two days later, the mayor's Director of Strategic Planning and Policy, Howard Libit, released a statement clarifying the mayor's remarks:

What she is saying within this statement was that there was an effort to give the peaceful demonstrators room to conduct their peaceful protests on Saturday. Unfortunately, as a result of providing the peaceful demonstrators with the space to share their message, that also meant that those seeking to incite violence also had the space to operate. The police sought to balance the rights of the peaceful demonstrators against the need to step in against those who were seeking to create violence. The mayor is not saying that she asked police to give space to people who sought to create violence. Any suggestion otherwise would be a misinterpretation of her statement.

Documentaries
Part 1 of a documentary video of the protests produced for WEAA during the day of April 25, before rioting started

Part 2 of the WEAA documentary video

An independent documentary video of the protests during the day of April 25, before rioting started

=== April 27 ===
==== Funeral ====
A funeral service was held for Freddie Gray at the New Shiloh Baptist Church on April 27 at 11a.m., after a one-hour public viewing. A large attendance included civil rights leaders, families of other people killed by police, and politicians including Congressman Elijah Cummings, Cabinet Secretary Broderick Johnson, White House adviser Heather Foster, and Elias Alcantara of the Office of Intergovernmental Affairs.

Gray is buried at Woodlawn Cemetery in Baltimore County, Maryland.

==== Preemptive actions ====
A photograph of the April 25 protesters standing on a Baltimore police car was superimposed with the text "All HighSchools Monday @3 We Are Going To Purge From Mondawmin To The Ave, Back To Downtown #Fdl" ("Purge" being a reference to the film series) and distributed on social media and as flyers. In response, Mondawmin Mall was closed at 2:15 p.m. and police in riot gear were deployed to the area. In preparation for the 'purge' police shut down the Mondawmin metro stop and also blockaded many of the nearby streets. As a result, students from Frederick Douglass High School, which is across the street from Mondawmin Mall, had considerable difficulty leaving the area via public transportation when their classes ended an hour after the "purge" began, and contributed to the swelling crowd.

According to eyewitness reports, expecting the "purge" to start at 3 p.m., Baltimore police pre-emptively de-boarded all buses going through the area, shut down the nearby Mondawmin Metro station and cordoned off the area around the mall. Eyewitnesses saw police detain students in that general area. The police, in full riot gear, detained the students for a full half-hour before the first brick was thrown. Meghann Harris, a teacher in the Baltimore school system, said on Facebook, "If I were a Douglass student that just got trapped in the middle of a minefield BY cops without any way to get home and completely in harm's way, I'd be ready to pop off, too."

Other closings in preparation or response to the riot included the University of Maryland Baltimore, which closed its campus in downtown Baltimore at 2:00 p.m. citing a police warning regarding "activities (that) may be potentially violent and UMB could be in the path of any violence", Baltimore City Community College, Coppin State University, the Lexington Market, the National Aquarium, and the Enoch Pratt Free Library system. The Baltimore Kinetic Sculpture Race was rescheduled from May 2 to June 14. A Baltimore Orioles baseball game against the Chicago White Sox scheduled for the evening at Oriole Park at Camden Yards, and the first of a three-game series, was also postponed due to the unrest.

==== Spread of violence ====
Initially 75–100 people who appeared to be high school students began throwing bricks and bottles at police near Mondawmin Mall after police refused high school students access to their primary means of getting home (the transportation hub at Mondawmin Mall), while ordering them to disperse and go home. The violence rapidly spread, and by later that day two patrol cars were destroyed and fifteen officers were injured. A police cruiser was destroyed, and some officers suffered broken bones. A CVS Pharmacy location in West Baltimore was looted and burned by rioters; no one in the CVS was hurt because employees had been evacuated before the CVS was looted and burned. In East Baltimore, the Mary Harvin Senior Center, an under-construction senior housing and services project, burned to the ground; it was rebuilt and opened in April 2016.

=== April 28 ===
==== Morning ====
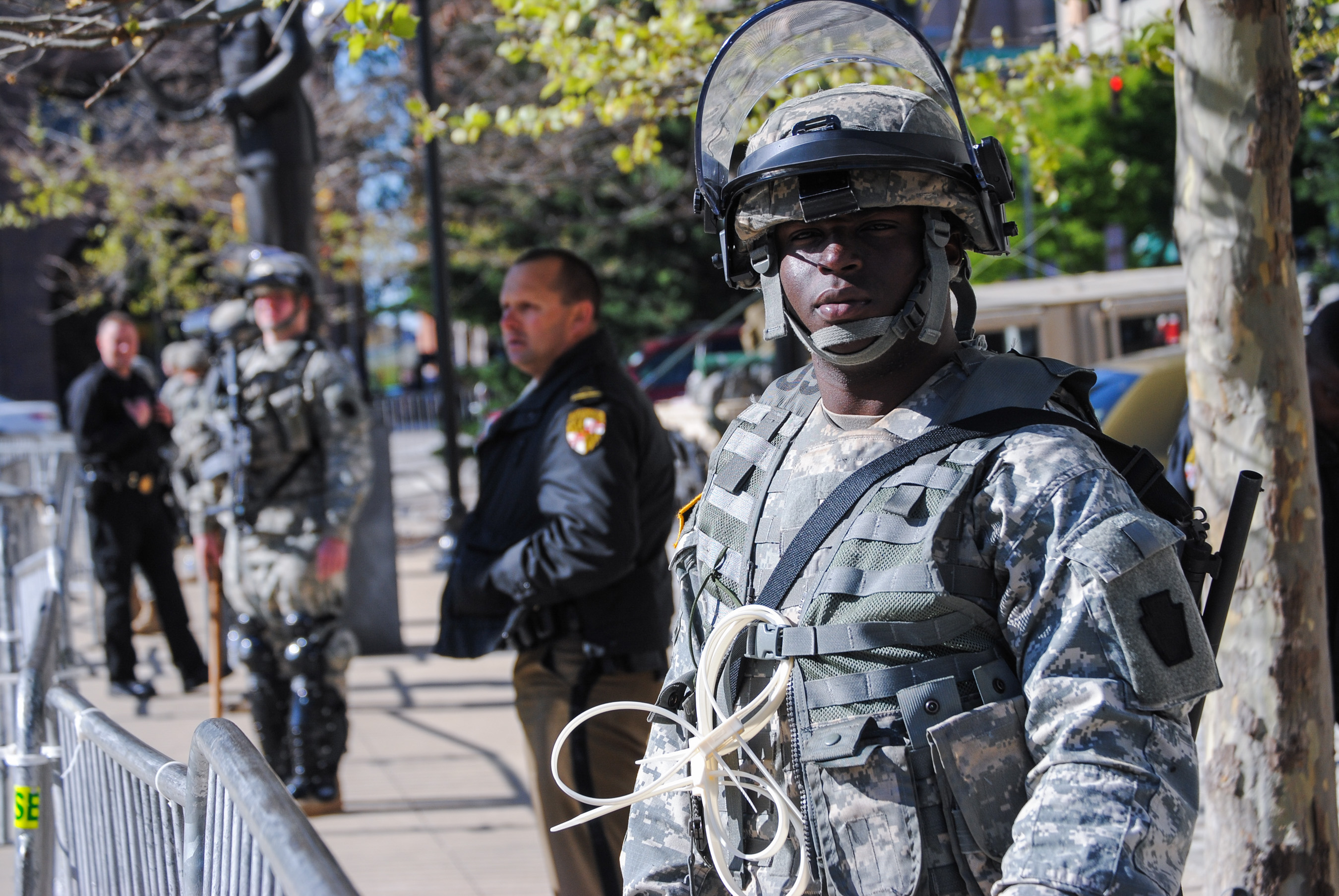
A soldier from 1st Battalion, 175th Infantry Regiment keeps watch in front of Baltimore City Hall on April 28

At about 6 a.m., firefighters extinguished flames and helped residents cleaning up after the overnight rioting. Soldiers from the 1st Battalion, 175th Infantry Regiment, Maryland Army National Guard arrived in Baltimore to provide security to vital infrastructure and to give additional support to police. At about 7:35 a.m., the Baltimore mayor's office reported that there were 144 vehicle fires, 15 structural fires, and nearly 200 arrests. One person had been badly hurt due to an arson.

At 8:25 a.m., it was announced that Maryland Gov. Larry Hogan was temporarily moving his office from Annapolis to Baltimore and that Hogan would visit scenes around Baltimore. At approximately 9:00 a.m., Hogan visited an intersection on West Baltimore that was heavily affected by the rioting with damaged vehicles and a looted convenience store, thanking those in the area for help cleaning up the streets.

In one incident that went viral during the previous night, Baltimore mother, Toya Graham, repeatedly struck and berated her son on TV for throwing rocks at police. Graham stated that she didn't want her son to end up like Freddie Gray, but also that he shouldn't seek justice by rioting. At 11:15 a.m. on April 28, Baltimore Police Commissioner Anthony Batts praised Graham, stating, "I wish I had more parents that took charge of their kids out there."

Baltimore County police spokesman Cpl. John Wachter also announced that Security Square Mall was going to be closed for the rest of the day following the spreading of rumours that planned actions were going to occur there. The Social Security Administration and the Centers for Medicare and Medicaid Services also closed.

==== Afternoon and evening ====
At noon, in the area where Freddie Gray was arrested, hundreds of volunteers were seen cleaning up debris left from the rioting. Police blocked off some of the area to assist with the clean up while hardware stores in the neighbourhood donated trash bags and brooms and city workers drove in trucks to carry away piles of trash and shattered glass.

At 12:55 p.m., President Obama stated that there had been too many worrying interactions between police and black citizens, but said there was "no excuse" for the violence of rioters in Baltimore. At about 1:30 p.m., crowds gathered at a damaged drug store where Rev. Jesse Jackson was visiting, with Jackson saying, "It was painful because it destroyed a lot of neighbourhood businesses and hurt a lot of people, but the violence is driven by that alienation." At a 2:30 p.m. speaking event by Capt. Eric Kowalczyk discussing incidents that occurred on April 27, demonstrators gathered peacefully, though one individual was arrested and pepper spray was used when some protesters became disorderly. At 3 p.m., Mayor Stephanie Rawlings-Blake took back comments calling rioters "thugs", saying that occasionally, "my little anger interpreter gets the best of me." Baltimore religious leaders announced that 14 churches throughout the city were open to give food to children that relied on schools to provide daily meals.

At 8:30 p.m., the CEO of Baltimore City Public Schools, Gregory Thornton, announced that Baltimore City Public School classes and after-school events would occur on April 29. Just before 9:00 p.m., several hundred protesters gathered around the CVS store that was looted, with some individuals separating the protesters and police, while a local pastor told demonstrators over a loud speaker to respect the curfew, saying, "Let's show the world, because the eyes of the world are on Baltimore right now." A police spokesman, Captain Eric Kowalczyk, stated that authorities were attempting to inform Baltimore residents of the 10 p.m. curfew in multiple ways, through police in patrol cars, sending messages through a police helicopter over the city and by calling residents through a Reverse 911 system.

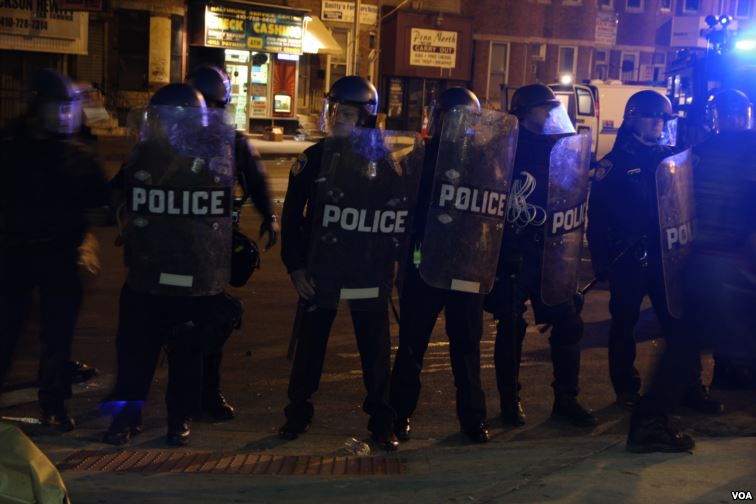
Baltimore riot police form a line to push back protesters and media members on April 28

At 10:15 p.m., hundreds of demonstrators, some throwing bottles at police, remained in the streets while police in riot gear began to move the crowds with speakers from helicopters overhead broadcasting, "You must go home. You cannot remain here. You will be subject to arrest." Tensions began to grow after individuals began to throw objects at police. Shortly after 10:30 p.m., smoke bombs or fireworks were thrown from the crowd and police equipped with riot shields began to slowly advance on the gathering with some people beginning to disperse. At 10:32 p.m., Baltimore Police tweeted that "Officers are now deploying pepper balls at the aggressive crowd". They then tweeted at 10:34 p.m. "People who remain on the street – who do not meet the exceptions – are now in violation of the emergency curfew" with police moving across the intersection and the crowd dispersing down side streets away from the area. At 10:50 p.m., military vehicles were seen driving through the streets to disperse the remaining crowd numbered with dozens of people. At 11:00 p.m., the CVS intersection was clear except for police and media workers who were exempt from the curfew. At 11:40 p.m., Baltimore Police Commissioner Anthony Batts stated that the curfew seemed to work and that ten people were arrested; seven for violating the curfew, two people for looting and one for disorderly conduct.

Between start of curfew and late night, 35 people, including one juvenile, had been arrested for violating the curfew.

=== April 29 – May 3 ===
After the riots, many small business owners struggled to clean up. Over 200 small businesses were unable to reopen by April 29. Residents of all ages, genders, and races came together to help clean Baltimore's streets. Eighteen were arrested for curfew violations on April 29.

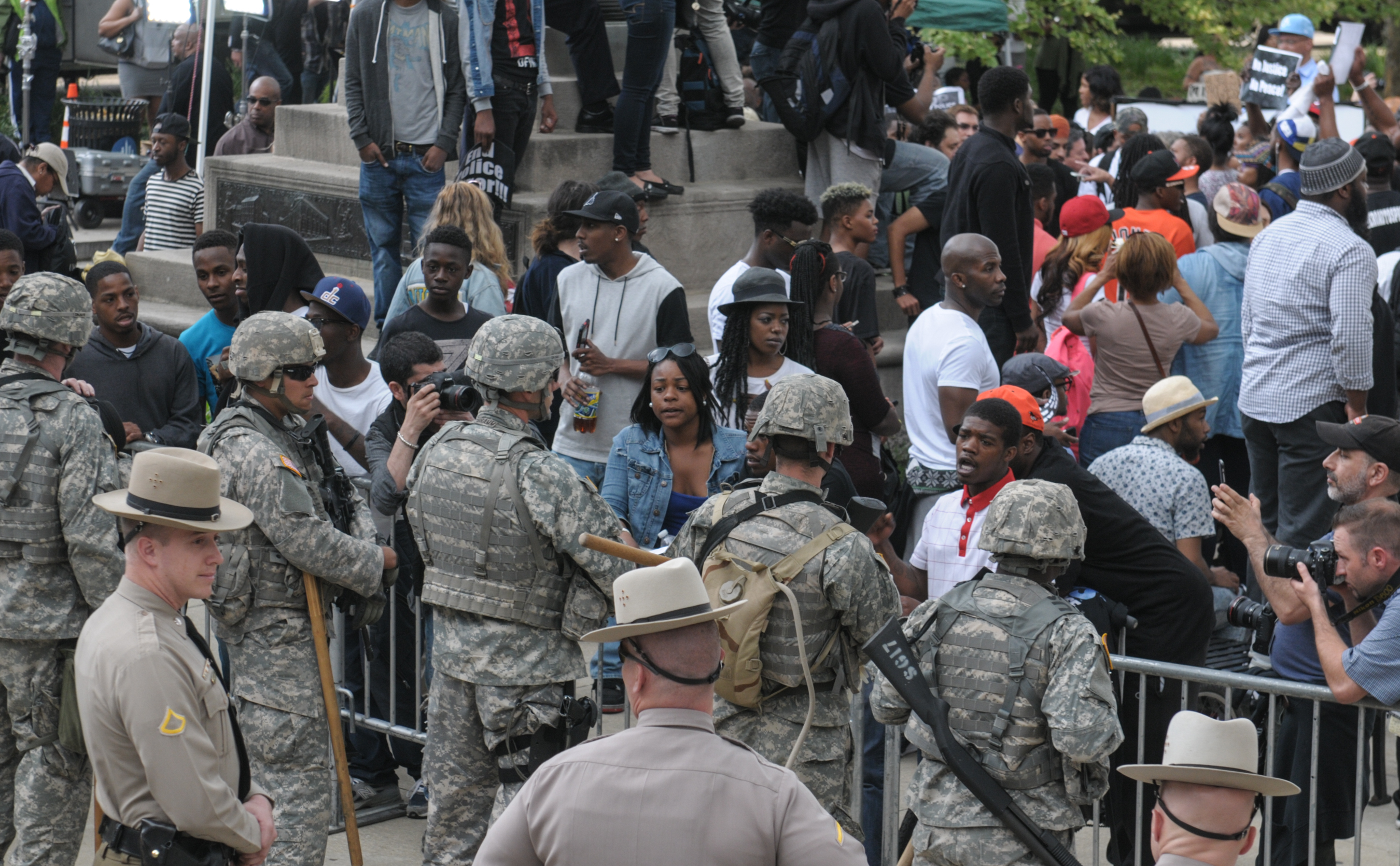
Protesters gathered in front of Baltimore City Hall on April 30

Still from FBI aerial surveillance footage of the April 29 protest

From April 29 to May 3, 2015, FBI surveillance aircraft used FLIR cameras to record video of civil unrest. In August 2016, 18 hours of footage was released following a FOIA request from the American Civil Liberties Union.

By April 30, over forty Korean American-owned businesses had been damaged by the riots. Chinese American and Arab American owned stores were also targeted, with looters directed by African American gangs towards those businesses.

Forty people were arrested for such night violations on May 1.

After the largest peaceful rally on Saturday, May 2, 2015, 46 people were arrested during the night time curfew.

One person arrested on May 2 was News2Share journalist Ford Fischer. He was handcuffed and initially charged with violating curfew, despite the police confirming that he was credentialed media. After confirming the charge as "curfew violation" to another journalist, the police changed it to a civil citation for "Disorderly Conduct." As of May 21, he still faces that citation. This all came after the police department had confirmed that media are exempt from the curfew via Twitter.

The night curfew on the city was lifted on May 3. Meanwhile, all charges against violators were dropped. It was found that in section 14-107 of the state's public safety code, only the governor and not the mayor has the authority to issue a curfew. It was decided that the arrests of violators were punishment enough. Those who committed violations of the law other than curfew violations have still been prosecuted.

The Maryland National Guard withdrew completely from Baltimore on May 4.

=== Result of investigation ===
Initially, the Baltimore Police Department suspended six officers with pay pending an investigation of Gray's death. The six officers involved in the arrest were identified as Lieutenant Brian Rice, Sergeant Alicia White, Officer William Porter, Officer Garrett Miller, Officer Edward Nero, and Officer Caesar Goodson. On April 24, 2015, Police Commissioner Anthony Batts said, "We know our police employees failed to get him medical attention in a timely manner multiple times." Batts also acknowledged police did not follow procedure when they failed to buckle Gray in the van while he was being transported to the police station. The U.S. Department of Justice also opened an investigation into the case.

== Charges filed, acquittals, and charges dropped ==
On May 1, 2015, after receiving a medical examiner's report ruling Gray's death a homicide, state prosecutors said that they had probable cause to file criminal charges against the six officers involved. Mosby said that the Baltimore police had acted illegally and that "No crime had been committed [by Freddie Gray]". Mosby said that Gray "suffered a critical neck injury as a result of being handcuffed, shackled by his feet and unrestrained inside the BPD wagon." Mosby said officers had "failed to establish probable cause for Mr. Gray's arrest, as no crime had been committed", and charged officers with false imprisonment, because Gray was carrying a pocket knife of legal size, and not the switchblade police claimed he had possessed at the time of his arrest. All six officers were taken into custody and processed at Baltimore Central Booking and Intake Center.

The trial of Officer William G. Porter, a black officer and the first of the six charged officers to go to trial, ended in a mistrial. The Prosecution had intended to have Porter testify against both his supervisor on the day, Sgt. Alicia White, and the driver of the van, Officer Caesar Goodson Jr. The trials ran into significant delays due to multiple motions being filed by both sides in the cases. On May 23, 2016, Officer Edward Nero was found not guilty on all four counts he was charged with, including two counts of misconduct in office, misdemeanor reckless endangerment, and misdemeanor assault in the second degree.

In addition to Nero, two others officers were subsequently acquitted. In July 2016, following the acquittals, Baltimore City State's Attorney Marilyn Mosby dropped charges against Porter and the remaining two officers.

== Related protests ==
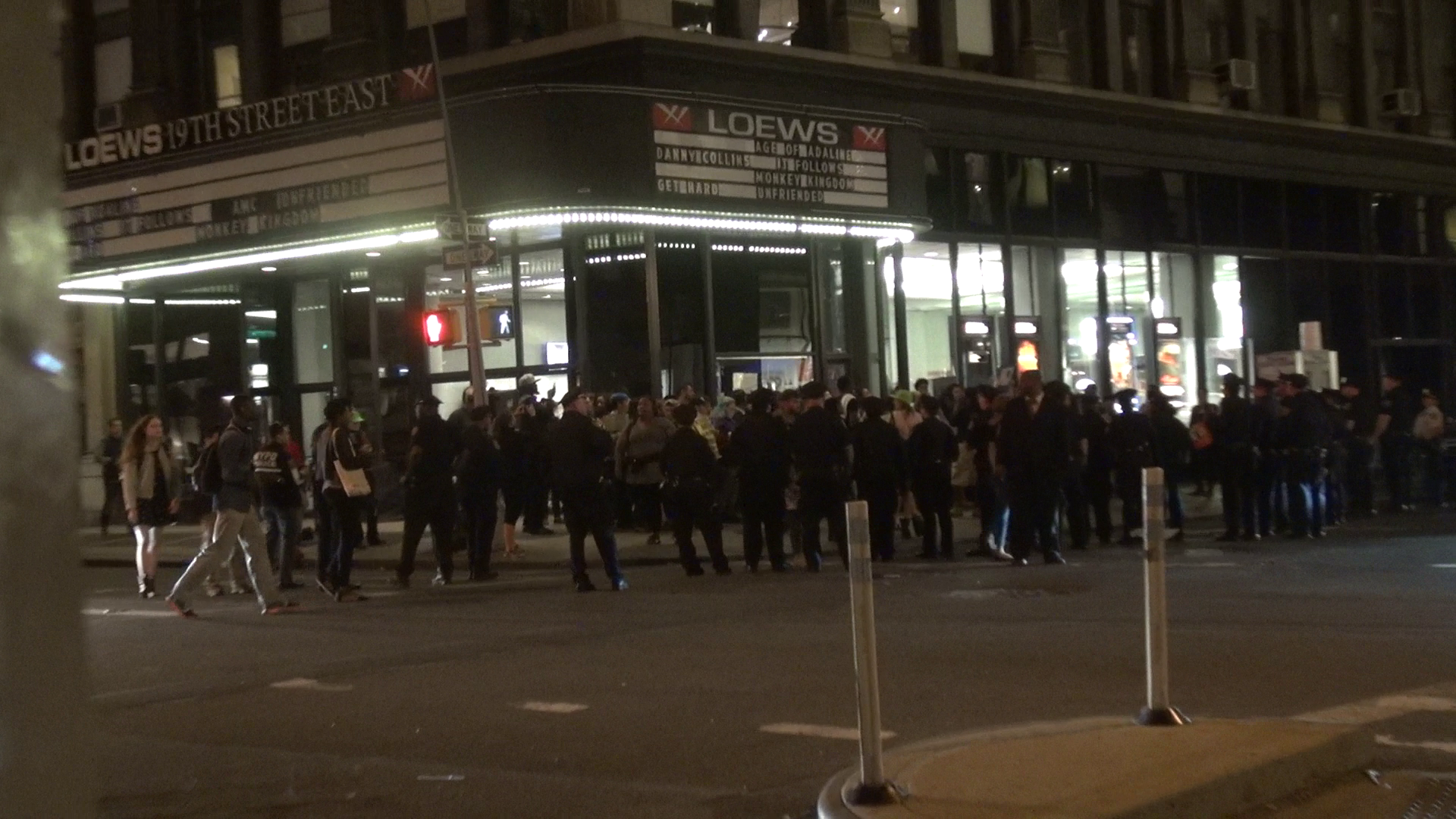
Police surround protesters at East 19th Street in New York City

On April 29, 2015, protesters marched through New York City, blocking off traffic in key areas, including the Holland Tunnel and West Side Highway. Carmen Perez, director of the criminal justice reform group Justice League, said, "It's all about solidarity, We're here to spread the message of peace from Baltimore's initial protests." More than 100 people were arrested, and the police did not allow the protest to take form before making arrests.

Anti-police brutality protests were also held in Denver in solidarity with the Baltimore protests. Eleven people were arrested on April 29, 2015, following physical altercations in which police used pepper spray on protesters who rallied around Colfax Avenue and Broadway street. The confrontation occurred shortly after 7 p.m. when an officer was knocked off his motorcycle by a protester and assaulted by five others. Police reported force was used in response to the incident. By 7:40 p.m., Broadway street was cleared for traffic as protesters relocated to the 16th Street Mall.

There were also solidarity protests in the cities of Ann Arbor, Albuquerque, Boston, Cincinnati, Minneapolis, Oakland, Philadelphia, Seattle, and Washington, D.C.

== Reactions ==
=== Preventive actions ===
==== Government actions ====
At a press conference in the evening, the mayor announced there would be a citywide curfew of 10 p.m. to 5 a.m. starting April 28. The Baltimore solicitor's office stated that a limitation of the curfew to only certain neighbourhood could potentially be viewed as racial discrimination. neighbouring Anne Arundel and Baltimore Counties cancelled school field trips and activities scheduled in Baltimore City until May 3. Officials also announced that Baltimore's city schools would be closed on Tuesday.

Maryland Governor Larry Hogan declared a state of emergency and activated the Maryland National Guard. Major General Linda Singh of the Maryland National Guard commented that there would be a "massive number" of soldiers in Maryland on the night of April 27, and that up to 5,000 soldiers could be deployed. Maryland State Police activated 500 officers for duty in Baltimore, and requested an additional 5,000 state police officers from other states.

Business owners in the city complained that the curfew required establishments with later hours to close their doors early, thereby costing them revenue from later hours customers and hurting their employees by forcing them to work fewer hours. Some businesses complained that the curfew cost them as much as $50,000. While those with night jobs were given an exemption to be allowed to travel to work, early closing hours continued to cost employees work hours. Despite criticism of curfew enforcement, Mayor Rawlings-Blake stood by the curfew, saying it was necessary to maintain control.

U.S. Attorney General Loretta Lynch requested an independent civil rights investigation into the Freddie Gray case in hopes of calming the violence in Baltimore.

==== Sports actions ====
The Baltimore Ravens had cancelled their NFL Draft party in response to the riots.

After consulting with Major League Baseball, the Baltimore Orioles announced that their second game in a series against the Chicago White Sox would also be postponed, and that their game on April 29 would be played in the afternoon behind closed doors. This was believed to be the first behind closed doors game in Major League Baseball history (it is occasionally seen in soccer as punishment for spectator behaviour). The attendance for the game was officially recorded as zero, thus breaking the previous record (of six, set in 1882) for the lowest attendance at a Major League Baseball game. The two cancelled games were made up as a doubleheader on May 28. The team also moved its May 1–3 series against the Tampa Bay Rays from Camden Yards to Tropicana Field, but still played as the home team (despite the Rays hosting it).

==== Gang involvement ====
After Baltimore police determined there was a "credible threat" of gang violence against police officers across the country, many departments across the US heightened their security in response: for example the Los Angeles Police Department ordered their officers to ride in pairs. Baltimore police claimed evidence to support the idea that the Black Guerrilla Family, the Bloods, and the Crips were "teaming up" to target police officers. Later, however, leaders of both the Bloods and the Crips denied the allegations, released a video statement asking for calm and peaceful protest in the area, and joined with police and clergy to enforce the curfew. At one occasion, gang members helped to prevent a riot at the Security Square Mall by dispersing would-be rioters. On other occasions, rival gang members helped each other to protect black-owned businesses, black children, and reporters, diverting rioters to Korean-, Chinese-, and Arab-owned businesses instead. On yet another occasion, the Bloods, the Crips, and the Nation of Islam were seen taking a picture together and working together to dispel violence while peacefully demonstrating.

=== Critical opinions ===
On April 28, President Barack Obama strongly condemned the violence during a White House press conference, saying, "There's no excuse for the kind of violence that we saw yesterday. It is counterproductive. ... When individuals get crowbars and start prying open doors to loot, they're not protesting. They're not making a statement. They're stealing. When they burn down a building, they're committing arson. And they're destroying and undermining businesses and opportunities in their own communities. That robs jobs and opportunity from people in that area." Obama went on to applaud the actions of peaceful protesters who he felt were being undermined by the violence, and called upon the nation to take meaningful action to collectively solve poverty and law enforcement issues fueling what he described as "a crisis".

On social media and elsewhere, Mayor Rawlings-Blake and President Obama were criticized for calling the rioters "thugs" on April 28.

When asked about the postponement of the Baltimore Orioles game, the Orioles' chief operating officer, John P. Angelos, said:

My greater source of personal concern, outrage and sympathy ... is focused neither upon one night's property damage nor upon the acts, but is focused rather upon the past four-decade period during which an American political elite have shipped middle class and working class jobs away from Baltimore and cities and towns around the U.S. to third-world dictatorships ... plunged tens of millions of good hard working Americans into economic devastation and then followed that action around the nation by diminishing every American's civil rights protections in order to control an unfairly impoverished population living under an ever-declining standard of living and suffering at the butt end of an ever-more militarized and aggressive surveillance state. The innocent working families of all backgrounds whose lives and dreams have been cut short by excessive violence, surveillance, and other abuses of the Bill of Rights by government pay the true price, an ultimate price, and one that far exceeds the importance of any kids' game played tonight, or ever....

=== Online reaction ===
The protests were originally covered on social media with the hashtag #BaltimoreRiots. However, by April 28, the more popular hashtag to cover the protests became #BaltimoreUprising. The change may have occurred in response to a decline in violent actions, or may have been the promotion of a new political narrative by social media users.

Dr. Denise Meringolo, an associate professor and public historian at the University of Maryland, Baltimore County, and Joe Tropea, Curator of Films and Photographs at the Maryland Historical Society, co-founded the Preserve the Baltimore Uprising digital archive to capture images and oral histories related to the protests directly from the local community.

=== Increase in violence and decrease in policing ===
Baltimore recorded 43 homicides in the month of May, the second deadliest month on record and the worst since December 1971 when 44 homicides were recorded. There have also been more than 100 non-fatal shootings in May 2015. Police commissioner Anthony Batts blames looted drugs, stolen from 27 pharmacies and two methadone clinics, as well as street distribution and turf wars for the spike in crime.

The increase in shootings has occurred along with a 50% decline in arrests since the charging of six officers in Gray's death in custody. The heavy police presence in crime-ridden neighbourhoods is no longer apparent with one resident stating, "Before it was over-policing. Now there's no police." One officer speaking anonymously stated, "After the protests, it seems like the citizens would appreciate a lack of police presence, and that's exactly what they're getting." Batts stated that his officers are "not holding back" despite encountering hostility in the Western District whenever they make an arrest with "30 to 50 people surrounding them at any time;" he also stated that his officers feel "confused and unsupported" in the wake of the charges. The president of the police union said his members are "afraid of going to jail for doing their jobs properly."

According to media reports, looting at 27 drugstores and two methadone clinics resulted in an increase in black market access to opiates.

== See also ==
- List of incidents of civil unrest in Baltimore
- List of incidents of civil unrest in the United States
- Ferguson unrest
- George Floyd protests
- Baltimore Rising
