= List of law enforcement agencies in Maryland =

This is a list of law enforcement agencies in the state of Maryland.

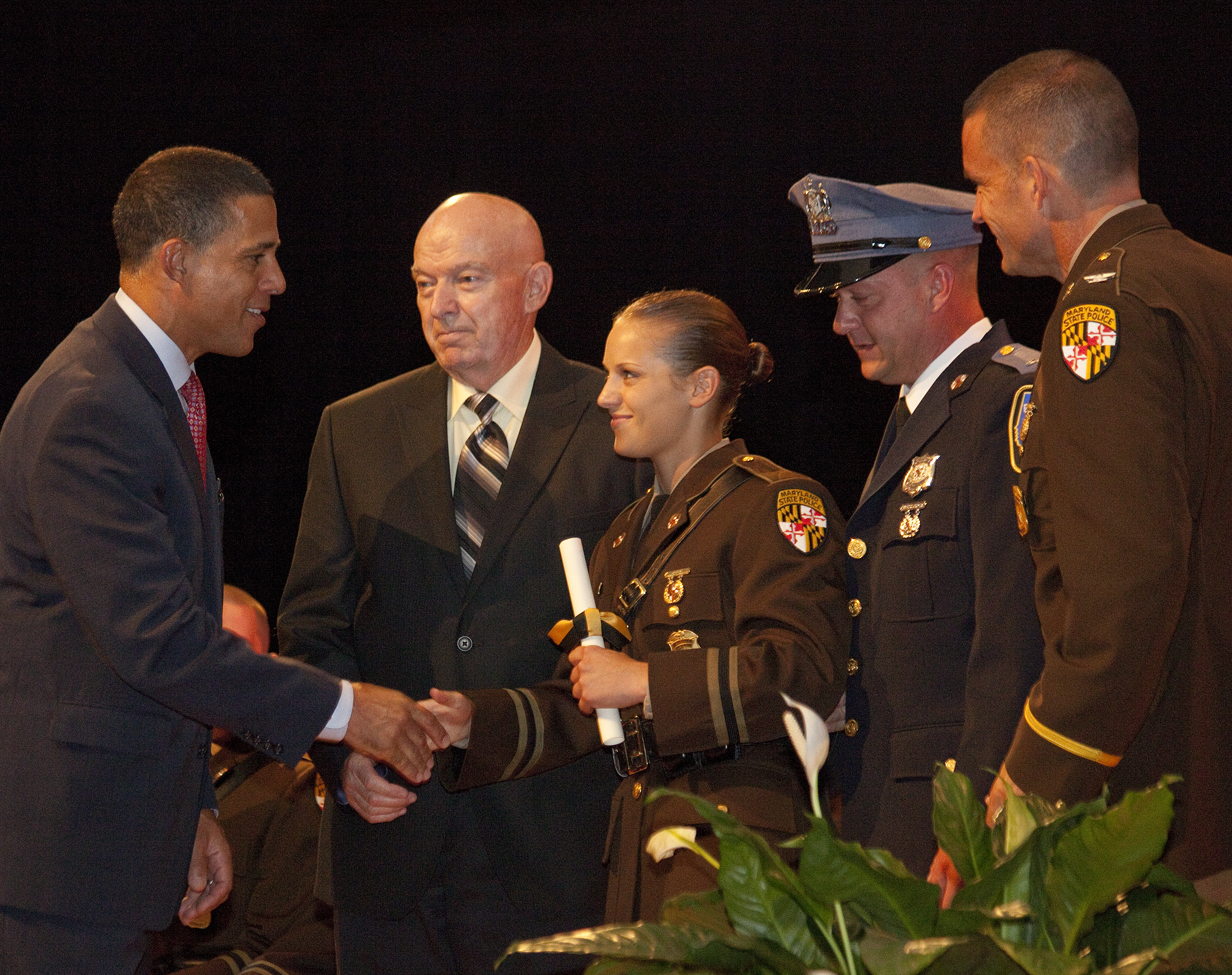
Former Lt. Governor Anthony Brown delivers Commencement Address at the 138th Maryland State Police Trooper Graduation in 2012

According to the U.S. Bureau of Justice Statistics' 2008 Census of State and Local Law Enforcement Agencies, the state had 142 law enforcement agencies employing 16,013 sworn police officers, about 283 for each 100,000 residents.

== State agencies ==
Policing zones of the Maryland State Police

- Maryland Capitol Police
- Maryland Department of Health Police
- Maryland Department of Labor Police
- Maryland Natural Resources Police
- Maryland-National Capital Park Police
- Maryland Motor Vehicle Administration Police Department
- Maryland Office of the Comptroller
- Maryland Department of Public Safety and Correctional Services
- Maryland State Police
  - Maryland State Fire Marshal
- Maryland Transit Administration Police
- Maryland Transportation Authority Police
- Washington Suburban Sanitary Commission Police

== County agencies ==
- Allegany County Sheriff's Office
- Allegany County Bureau of Police (disbanded)
- Anne Arundel County Police Department
- Anne Arundel County Sheriff's Office
- Baltimore County Police Department
- Baltimore County Sheriff's Office
- Calvert County Sheriff's Office
- Carroll County Sheriff's Office
- Caroline County Sheriff's Department
- Cecil County Sheriff's Office
- Charles County Sheriff's Office
- Dorchester County Sheriff's Office
- Frederick County Sheriff's Office
- Garrett County Sheriff's Office
- Harford County Sheriff's Office
- Howard County Police Department
- Howard County Sheriff's Office
- Kent County Sheriff's Office
- Montgomery County Police Department
- Montgomery County Sheriff's Office
- Prince George's County Police Department
- Prince George's County Sheriff's Office
- Queen Anne's County Sheriff's Office
- St. Mary's County Sheriff's Office
- Somerset County Sheriff's Office
- Talbot County Sheriff's Office
- Washington County Sheriff's Office
- Wicomico County Sheriff's Office
- Worcester County Sheriff's Office

== Municipal agencies ==
- Aberdeen Police Department
- Annapolis Police Department
- Baltimore Police Department
- Baltimore City Schools Police
- Baltimore City Sheriff's Office
- Baltimore City Environmental Police
- Bel Air Police Department
- Berlin Police Department
- Berwyn Heights Police Department
- Bladensburg Police Department
- Boonsboro Police Department
- Bowie Police Department
- Brentwood Police Department
- Brunswick Police Department
- Cambridge Police Department
- Capitol Heights Police Department
- Centreville Police Department
- Chestertown Police Department
- Cheverly Police Department
- Chevy Chase Village Police Department
- Colmar Manor Police Department
- Cottage City Police Department
- Crofton Police Department
- Crisfield Police Department
- Cumberland Police Department
- Delmar Police Department
- Denton Police Department
- District Heights Police Department
- Easton Police Department
- Edmonston Police Department
- Elkton Police Department
- Fairmont Heights Police Department
- Federalsburg Police Department
- Forest Heights Police Department
- Frederick City Police Department
- Frostburg City Police Department
- Fruitland Police Department
- Gaithersburg Police Department
- Gibson Island Police
- Glenarden Police Department
- Greenbelt Police Department
- Greensboro Police Department
- Hagerstown Police Department
- Hampstead Police Department
- Hancock Police Department
- Havre De Grace Police Department
- Hurlock Police Department
- Hyattsville City Police Department
- Landover Hills Police Department
- La Plata Police Department
- Laurel Police Department
- Manchester Police Department
- Morningside Police Department
- Mount Airy Police Department
- Mount Rainier Police Department
- New Carrollton Police Department
- North East Police Department
- Oakland Police Department
- Ocean City Police Department
- Ocean Pines Police Department
- Oxford Police Department
- Perryville Police Department
- Pokomoke City Police Department
- Princess Anne Police Department
- Ridgley Police Department
- Rising Sun Police Department
- Riverdale Park Police Department
- Rockville City Police Department
- Rock Hall Police Department
- St. Michaels Police Department
- Salisbury Police Department
- Seat Pleasant Police Department
- Smithsburg Police Department
- Snow Hill Police Department
- Sykesville Police Department
- Takoma Park Police Department
- Taneytown Police Department
- Thurmont Police Department
- University Park Police Department
- Upper Marlboro Police Department
- Westminster Police Department

== University agencies ==
- Anne Arundel Community College, Department of Public Safety & Police
- Baltimore City Community College Department of Public Safety
- Bowie State University, Department of Public Safety
- Breakthrough Bible College Police Office of Law Enforcement & Public Safety
- Carroll Community College Campus Police Department
- Cecil College Public Safety
- Chesapeake College Department of Public Safety
- Community College of Baltimore County Department of Public Safety
- Coppin State University Police Department
- Frostburg State University Police Department
- Harford Community College Department of Public Safety
- Hood College Department of Campus Safety
- Johns Hopkins University Campus Safety and Security
- Loyola University Maryland Department of Public Safety
- McDaniel College Department of Campus Safety & Campus Police Unit
- Montgomery College Public Safety
- Morgan State University Police Department
- Prince George's Community College Campus Police Department
- Salisbury University Police Department
- St. Mary's College of Maryland Office of Public Safety
- St. Johns College Public Safety
- Towson University Police Department
- United States Naval Academy - Naval Support Activity - Annapolis Police
- University of Baltimore Police Department; Defunct
- University of Maryland, Baltimore Police Department
- University of Maryland, Baltimore County Police Department
- University of Maryland, College Park Police Department
- University of Maryland, Eastern Shore Department of Public Safety
- Washington College Department of Public Safety Campus Police

== Law enforcement units within fire agencies ==
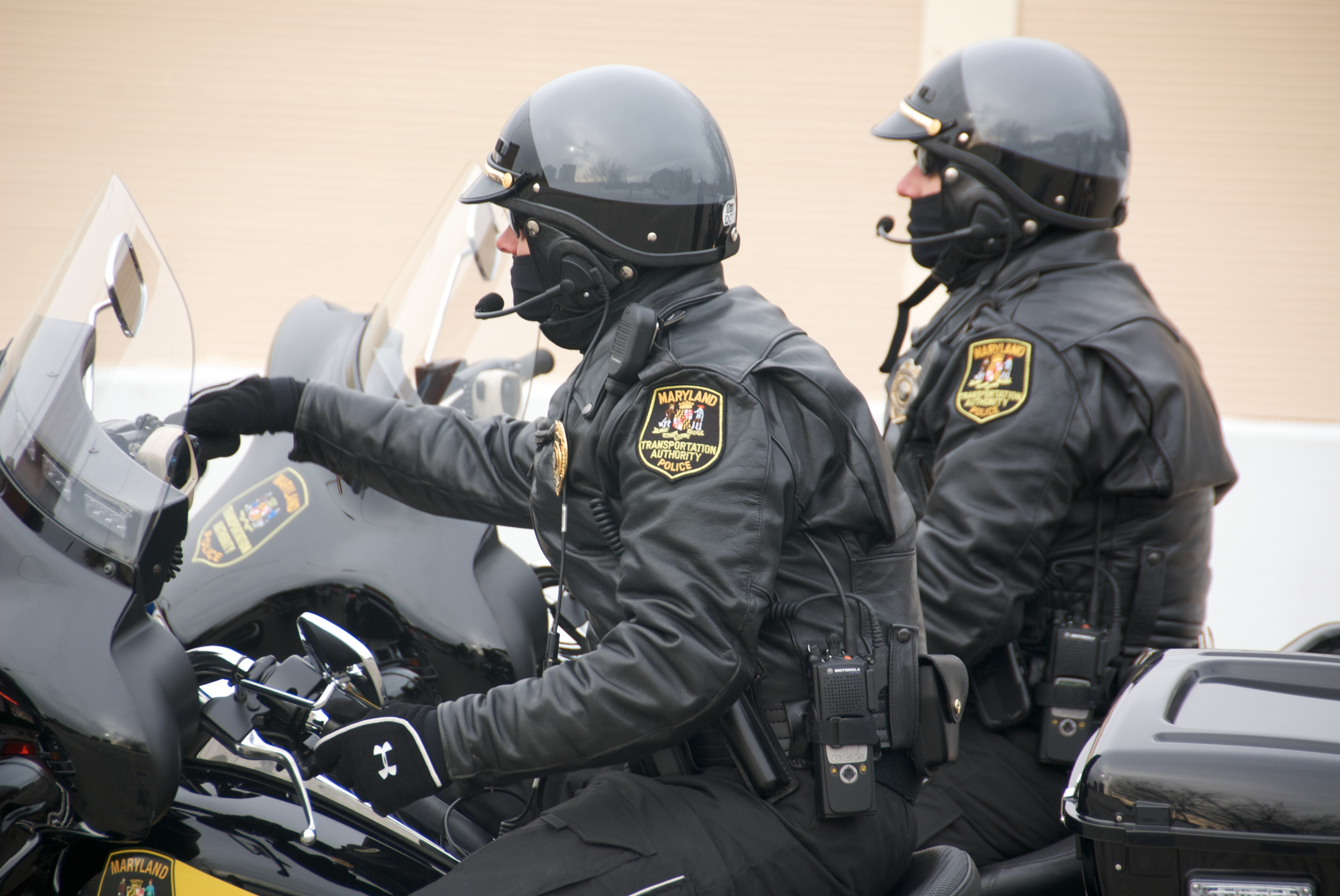
Maryland Transportation Authority Police.

- Annapolis Fire Department - Office of the Fire Marshal
  - Bomb Squad
- Anne Arundel County Fire Department - Office of the Fire Marshal
- Montgomery County Fire and Rescue Service - Fire & Explosive Investigations
  - Bomb Squad
- Prince George's County Fire/EMS Department - Office of the Fire Marshal
  - Bomb Squad
- Howard County Department of Fire and Rescue Services - Office of the Fire Marshal
- City of Hagerstown Fire Department - Office of the Fire Marshal
- Ocean City Fire Marshal Office
  - Bomb Squad

== Other agencies ==
- Aberdeen Proving Ground Police
- Amtrak Police
- CSX Railroad Police
- Federal Protective Service
- Fort Detrick Police
- Fort Meade Police
- Gibson Island Police
- Metro Transit Police Department
- National Institutes of Health Police
- National Institute of Standards and Technology Police
- National Security Agency Police
- Office of the United States Marshal for the District of Maryland
- United States Naval District of Washington Police - Naval Support Activity - Annapolis & US Naval Academy
- United States Park Police
- United States Special Investigation Service
- National Park Service Law Enforcement Rangers
- United States Coast Guard Police Department, Baltimore
- United States Department of Veterans Affairs Police
- United States Naval District of Washington Police - Naval Support Activity - Bethesda
- United States Naval District of Washington Police - Naval Support Facility - Indian Head
- United States Naval District of Washington Police - Naval Air Station - Patuxent River
- Naval Criminal Investigative Service
- United States Army Criminal Investigations Division Command

== Defunct agencies ==
- Housing Authority of Baltimore City Police Force
- Baltimore City Park Police
- Barton Police Department
- Charlestown Police Department
- Chesapeake Beach Police Department
- Clear Spring Police Department
- Emmitsburg Police Department
- Goldsboro Police Department
- Kitzmiller Police Department
- Leonardtown Police Department
- Lonaconing Police Department
- Luke Police Department
- North Beach Police Department
- New Windsor Police Department
- Port Deposit Police Department
- Sparrows Point Police Department
- Trappe Police Department
- Union Bridge Police Department
- University of Baltimore Police Department
- Westernport Police Department
- Williamsport Police Department
- Willards Police Department
- Woodland Beach Police Department
- Allegany County Bureau of Police
- Naval Station Annapolis Police Department (Merged with US Naval Academy PD to form NDW - NSA-Annapolis)
- US Naval Academy Police Department (Merged with NAVSTA Annapolis PD to form NDW - NSA-Annapolis)

== See also ==
- Maryland Department of Public Safety and Correctional Services

Crime:

- Crime in Maryland

General:

- Law enforcement in the United States
