= Maryland state budget =

The Maryland state budget for each fiscal year, covering a period ending on June 30, is approved by the Maryland General Assembly. For the fiscal year ending June 30, 2018, Maryland had a budget of $43.6 billion.

Income for the Maryland budget is received from corporate tax, sales tax, individual income tax, and property tax.

== Budget by counties ==
Maryland's budget is invested in the following departments:

- Maryland Department of Health
- Maryland State Police
- Maryland Department of Transportation ($5 billion annual budget)
- Maryland Department of Natural Resources and its Maryland Department of Natural Resources Police (NRP)
- Maryland Department of General Services
- Maryland Department of Aging
- Maryland Department of Agriculture
- Maryland Department of Public Safety and Correctional Services
- Maryland Office of the Comptroller
- Maryland Police and Correctional Training Commission
- Maryland Transit Administration Police

=== Budget for the University System of Maryland ===
The portion of Maryland's budget invested in University System of Maryland is $5.48 billion. USM is a public corporation and charter school system comprising 12 Maryland institutions of higher education, this budget is distributed among its universities:

- University of Maryland, College Park ($2.1 billion)
- University of Maryland, Baltimore County ($404.9 million)
- University of Maryland, Baltimore ($1.1 billion )
- University of Maryland Eastern Shore ($100 million).
- Frostburg State University ($100 million).
- Coppin State University ($100 million).
- Bowie State University
- Universities at Shady Grove
- University System of Maryland at Hagerstown
- Salisbury University
- Towson University
- University of Maryland Global Campus
- University of Maryland Center for Environmental Science).
- University of Maryland Biotechnology Institute (Located in Inner Harbor).

=== Budget for Maryland counties ===
Another portion of the budget is invested in the State of Maryland's 23 counties:

For example, FY 2018 Maryland state budget included $2.3 billion for Montgomery County, of which $1.48 billion was invested in Montgomery County Public Schools and $128 million in Montgomery College. Montgomery County Public Libraries received $40.6 million of the budget. Other departments receiving a share of the FY 2018 budget included Montgomery County Police Department, Montgomery County Fire and Rescue Service, and Department of Recreation.

== Government budget balance ==
Government budget balance in 2018 presents a gap between budget proposed and Maryland income of US$250 million. In 2018, there was no surplus in Maryland finances. By 2025, there was budget deficit of more than US$3 billion.

== See also ==
- List of counties in Maryland
