= Annapolis Police Department =

Coordinates: 38°58′43.66″N 76°30′20.21″W

- Annapolis Police patch
- Abbreviation: APD

Agency overview
- Formed: 1867

Jurisdictional structure
- Operations jurisdiction: Maryland, USA
- General nature: Civilian police

Operational structure
- Headquarters: Annapolis, Maryland
- Officers: 131
- Agency executive: Amy Miguez, Acting Chief Of Police

The Annapolis Police Department (APD) is a full-service law enforcement agency servicing a population of over 38,000 residents in 7.1 square miles (18 km^{2}) of the municipality of Annapolis, Maryland.

== History ==
The APD started as "city watchmen" with the granting of the city royal charter in 1708. At the time, the Anne Arundel County Sheriff's Office held concurrent jurisdiction within Annapolis proper for the first six years, after which the city would elect its own Sheriff (as is the case still today in Baltimore). The term "police officer" was not used until 1861. Like today, these police officers answered to the mayor of the city. It wasn't until 1867 that the Annapolis Police Department was officially created by an act of legislation by the Maryland General Assembly. Today, 131 sworn officers protect a thriving city of 39,000 permanent residents and over 2 million annual visitors. Officers responded to more than 41,000 calls for service in 2007. The department is located at 199 Taylor Avenue.

== List of chiefs ==
- 1867 - 1869 Thomas Basil
- 1869 - 1870 Nicholas J. Deal
- 1871 - 1872 Elijah J. Russell
- 1873 - 1875 Benjamin F. Cadell
- 1875 - 1879 Henry Burlinghame
- 1880 - 1882 James B. Thomas
- 1883 John E. Brown
- 1883 - 1886 James T. Small
- 1887 - 1895 Arthur Martin
- 1896 - 1901 Howard B. Taylor
- 1901 - 1902 Travers T. Brown
- 1903 Howard B. Taylor
- 1904 - 1907 George Hahn, Jr.
- 1907 - 1925 Charles H. Oberry
- 1926 - 1935 Richard B. Holliday
- 1935 - 1949 William R. Curry, Sr.
- 1949 - 1961 George W. Rawlings
- 1961 - 1973 Anthony W. Howes
- 1973 - 1980 Bernard Kalnoske
- 1980 Samuel A. Cyrus
- 1980 - 1990 John C. Schmitt
- 1990 Cassin B. Gittings
- 1990 - 1994 Harold M. Robbins, Jr.
- 1994 - 2008 Joseph S. Johnson
- 2008 - 2017 Michael Pristoop
- 2017 - 2019 Scott Baker
- 2019 - 2019 Paul Herman (Acting)
- 2019 - 2026 Edward Jackson
- 2026 - present Amy Miguez (acting)

== Thumbnails ==
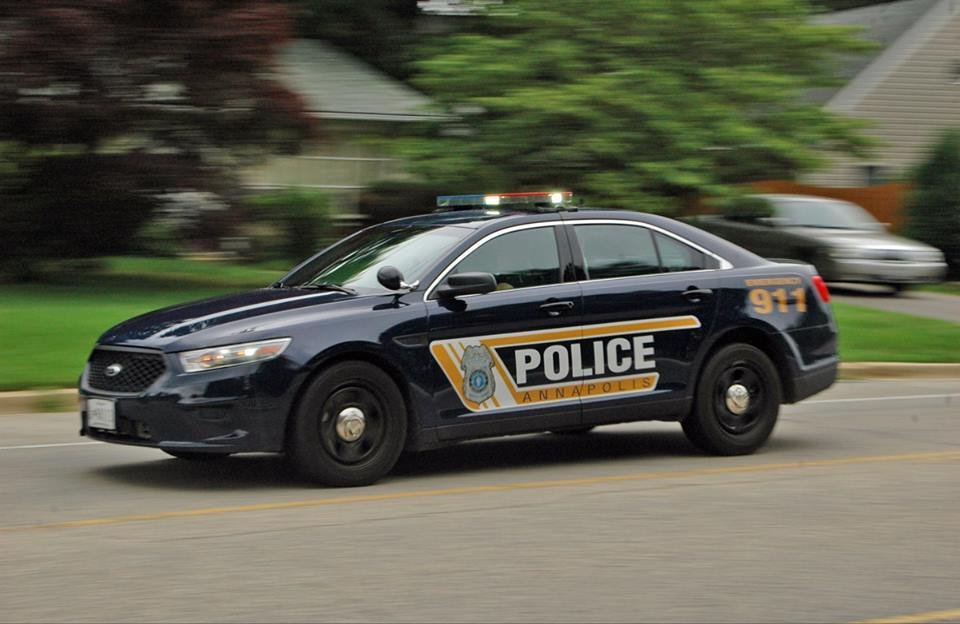

== See also ==
- List of law enforcement agencies in Maryland
