= OCPD (disambiguation) =

OCPD may refer to:

- Obsessive–compulsive personality disorder, a personality disorder involving orderliness
- Oklahoma City Police Department, the municipal police department of Oklahoma City, Oklahoma, USA
- Ocean City Police Department, the municipal police department of Ocean City, Maryland, USA
