= Charles County Sheriff's Office =

Law enforcement agency in Charles County, Maryland, US

- Abbreviation: CCSO

Agency overview
- Formed: 1658; 368 years ago

Jurisdictional structure
- Operations jurisdiction: Charles, Maryland, United States
- Map of Charles County Sheriff's Office's jurisdiction
- Area: 457.8 square miles (1,186 km^{2})
- Population: 166,617
- General nature: Local civilian police

Operational structure
- Headquarters: La Plata, Maryland
- Agency executive: Troy Berry, Sheriff

Website
- https://www.ccso.us/

The Charles County Sheriff's Office (CCSO) is a nationally accredited, full-service law enforcement agency servicing a population of 166,617 within 457.8 square miles (1,186 km^{2}) of Charles County, Maryland, United States.

== History ==
The CCSO was created in 1658 with the appointment of Nicholas Gwyther as dual Sheriff of Charles County and Saint Mary's County.

Sheriff Troy Berry retired in October 2022, although he remained on the ballot for the election in November.

== Organization ==
In 2008, the sheriff was Troy Berry. The agency employs more than 900 sworn and civilian employees. The CCSO is divided into nine divisions and the office of the sheriff.

- Patrol Division- is responsible for answering 9-1-1 calls, traffic enforcement, and other duties as directed by authority. The patrol division divides the county into four districts:
  - La Plata
  - Indian Head
  - Waldorf
  - Saint Charles
- Special Operations Division (SOD)- is responsible for specialized services and is divided into two sections:
  - Special Operations Section- contains the Tactical Response Squad, K-9, Traffic Operations Unit, Emergency Services Team (SWAT), Hostage Negotiations, and Marine Security Response Vessel.
  - Community Services Section- contains the Community Policing Unit (COPS), Juvenile Resource, Crime Prevention, Teen Court, Alcohol Enforcement Detail, and Honor Guard.
- Criminal Investigation Division (CID)- is responsible for the investigation of felonious crimes such as murder, sexual assault, felonious assault, and other such offenses. The Division is divided into three sections:
  - Investigations Section- which includes the Detective Bureau, Special Victims Unit (SVU), Forensics (CSI), Auto theft (WAVE), and Financial Crimes.
  - Narcotics Enforcement Section- which includes the Drug Task Force (co-op with the DEA, Major Narcotics Unit, and Vice.
  - Homeland Security and Intelligence Section- investigates gang violence and crimes, organized crime, and domestic and foreign terrorism.
- Corrections Division- is responsible for housing and transporting inmates within the Charles County court system. The detention facility spans 135,000 square feet (12,500 m^{2}) and contains 203 cells. The division is divided into two sections:
  - Custody and Security- maintains the housing proper on a constant basis and also has an in-house Emergency Response Team (a specialized corrections-style "SWAT" unit) to handle disturbances as directed by authority.
  - Support Services- is responsible for central processing ("booking") and inmate services. The section also provides the inmates with a formal library, commissary, and security maintenance services.
- Information Services Division- is a largely civilian support division that contains three sections:
  - Communications (9-1-1 and emergency dispatch)
  - Management Information Services- Information Technology (IT) support
  - Records- contains Teletype (TTY), stores police reports, traffic citations/warnings/SERO's, and court records (e.g., warrants, court processes, etc.)
- Special Services Division- is responsible for providing police property storage and acting as the enforcement arm of the court system. This division contains two sections:
  - Judicial Services Section- which is responsible for maintaining the safety and security of the courthouse and surrounding property. This section also holds temporary housing facilities for in-custody defendants attending trial at the court house. This section also contains the Warrant/Fugitive Unit, Domestic Violence Unit, and the Civil Unit.
  - Property Management Section- is responsible for uniform, fleet maintenance, equipment, and for holding and safeguarding the chain-of-custody of police property.
- Executive Services Division- responsible for accreditation, chaplain services, cadet/explorer program, and criminal justice program.
- Administrative Services Division- is responsible for civilian and sworn human resources (recruitment), pre-employee screening and investigations, and the agency's fiscal responsibility.
- Training Division- is responsible for training and maintaining the certification of the agency's employees. This division also maintains and commands the Southern Maryland Criminal Justice Academy in cooperation with the St. Mary's and Calvert County Sheriff's Offices

== See also ==
- List of law enforcement agencies in Maryland
