= MPTC =

MPTC may refer to:

- Mandal Parishad Territorial Constituency, a political subdivision in India
- Maryland Police and Correctional Training Commission
- Ministry of Posts and Telecommunications, Cambodia, a ministry in the government of Cambodia
- Moraine Park Technical College, in the Wisconsin Technical College System

== See also ==
- MPTCP, multipath TCP
