= Takoma Park Police Department =

Law enforcement agency

- Abbreviation: TPPD
- Motto: "You never know"

Jurisdictional structure
- Operations jurisdiction: Maryland, USA
- Area: 2.5 square miles
- Population: 18,000 appx.
- General nature: Civilian police

Operational structure
- Headquarters: 7500 Maple Ave Takoma Park, Maryland; 38°58′53″N 77°0′36″W
- Officers: 43 Approx ( as of 2017)
- Civilians: 17 Approx ( as of 2017)
- Agency executive: Antonio "Tony" DeVaul, Chief Of Police

The Takoma Park Police Department (TPPD) is the primary law enforcement agency servicing a population of approximately 17,670 (2014 est.), within 2.5 square miles (6.5 km^{2}) of the municipality of Takoma Park, Maryland. Until July 1, 1997, the TPPD was aided by both the Prince George's County Police and the Montgomery County Police as the city was divided within the two counties. After that date, the municipality was moved to become contained entirely within Montgomery County by a move of the Maryland General Assembly.

== Organization ==
The TPPD is a full-service agency consisting of 43 sworn officers (not including the chief), dispatchers, and a support staff consisting of civilians. The TPPD is divided into three divisions and is the only full service Municipal agency operating in Montgomery County Md with designated detectives, K-9, and an Emergency Response Team:

- Patrol Division
- Support Services Division
- Administration Division

The primary vehicle of the Takoma Park Police Department is the Ford Police Interceptor Utility SUV. TPPD previously used the Ford Crown Victoria and Taurus until they were discontinued. Takoma Park Police officers carry the Glock 17/19 9mm pistol and wear black uniforms.

== Ranks ==
Rank	Insignia
Chief	
Deputy Chief	
Captain	
Lieutenant	
Sergeant	3 white chevrons.
Corporal	2 white chevrons.
Private First Class	1white chevron.

== See also ==
- List of law enforcement agencies in Maryland
