= Allegany County Sheriff's Office =

Primary law enforcement agency for Allegany County, Maryland, US

Coordinates: 39°36′29″N 78°49′7.5″W

Allegan County Sheriff's Office
- Patch of the Allegany County Sheriff's Office
- Abbreviation: ACSO

Agency overview
- Formed: 1791; 235 years ago

Jurisdictional structure
- Operations jurisdiction: Allegany, Maryland, US
- Map of Allegan County Sheriff's Office's jurisdiction
- Area: 430 square miles (1,100 km^{2})
- Population: 73,639 (2005)
- General nature: Local civilian police

Operational structure
- Headquarters: Cumberland, Maryland
- Agency executive: Craig Robertson (R), Sheriff

Website
- Allegany County Sheriff's Office

The Allegany County Sheriff's Office (ACSO) is the primary law enforcement agency for Allegany County, Maryland. The ACSO is a nationally accredited law enforcement agency servicing 430 square miles (1,100 km^{2}) and a population of 75,300.

== History ==
The Allegany County was created in 1789 when Allegany County was created from a portion of Washington County by the Acts of 1789. The Allegany County Sheriff's Office began when John C. Beatty was elected the first sheriff in 1791. The current sheriff is Craig Robertson Who was elected in November 2010 after the retirement of longtime Sheriff David A. Goad.

== Organization ==
The ACSO is divided into four divisions:

- The Patrol Division - Is currently only responsible for the service of court orders (e.g., Protective Orders, Peace Orders, Criminal Summons, Warrants, etc.) However full patrol duties are expected to be returned to the Patrol Division after the Allegany County Bureau of Police is dissolved by the Allegany County Commissioners sometime during 2011.
- The Correctional Division - Responsible for housing offenders and transportation.
- The Judicial Division - Responsible for lesser offenses, offenders not deemed a threat to public safety. Monitors community service programs.
- The Court Security Division - Responsible for the security of the courthouse and all personnel.

== Allegany County Bureau of Police ==
Created in 2008 and disbanded in 2011, the "Bureau of Police" (BOP) was created by the Allegany County Board of Commissioners who were largely in disagreement with then-Sheriff Goad as to how to police the county. Patrol and detective services were taken from the sheriff and given to the BOP. The Sheriff's Office continued court security, court order service, and jail duties. The creation of the BOP and their relationship with the Sheriff's Office were subjects of discontent with the citizens of the county, who in turn, voted out of office the three commissioners who voted in favor of the creation of the BOP. Subsequently, all patrol and detective services were returned to the Sheriff's Office in 2011.

== Administration ==
Sheriff-Craig Robertson

Major Randy Cutter Administration Supervisor

Captain David Morgan Administrative and Judicial Supervisor

Lieutenant Israel Sibley Patrol Administrator/Shift Supervisor

Lieutenant Brett Lysinger Patrol Administrator/Shift Supervisor

Sergeant Chris Hill K-9 Judicial Supervisor

Sergeant Vincent Benson Road Supervisor

Sergeant Jon Dowden Road Supervisor

Sergeant Justin Gordon Road Supervisor

Patrol Administrative Assistants:

Sherri Thompson

Tammi Mann

Detention Center - Assistant Administrator

Captain: Daniel B. Lasher

Training Director

Lieutenant: Rhonda L. Downton

Operations Director

Lieutenant: Betsy Shoemake

Security Director

Lieutenant: William Greise

Administrative Assistant

Linda Greise

Alternative Sentencing

Labor Unit Manager: James Bone

Judicial Unit Manager: Chapin Jewell

== Patrol Division ==
The Allegany County Sheriffs Patrol is a sworn full service Patrol Law Enforcement Agency serving the citizens of Allegany County. Sheriffs Deputies are responsible for the enforcement of all criminal and civil laws of the State of Maryland which includes the investigation of any crimes, traffic violations and vehicle accidents. Sheriffs Deputies are servants of the Circuit and District Courts and serve both criminal and civil process generated by the courts and a Deputy is assigned full-time to warrant service in the County. Sheriffs Deputies are also responsible for the security of the Allegany County Circuit Court and Getty Annex. Deputies are also assigned to the Allegany County Combined Criminal Investigations Unit (C3i) and Drug Task Force which investigates all major crimes and drug activity in the County.

- Division

== List of Sheriffs ==
Sheriffs of the Allegany County Sheriff's Office
In office		Name	Party
1946	1958	Edward R. Muir	
1958	1970	Paul C. Haberlein	Republican
1970	1974	William E. Orr, Jr.	
1974	1978	Francis D. Michaels	
1978	1990	Donald R. Wade	Republican
1990	1994	Gary Simpson	Republican
1994	2010	David Goad	Democratic
2010	Incumbent	Craig Robertson	Republican

== See also ==
- List of law enforcement agencies in Maryland
