= Greenbelt Police Department (Maryland) =

Coordinates: 39°0′23″N 76°53′30″W

- Greenbelt Police Department patch
- Abbreviation: GPD

Agency overview
- Employees: 69

Jurisdictional structure
- Operations jurisdiction: Greenbelt, Maryland, USA
- Population: 23,541 (2012 est)
- General nature: Local civilian police

Operational structure
- Officers: 55
- Civilian employees: 14
- Agency executive: Richard Bowers, Chief of Police

Facilities
- Headquarters: 550 Crescent Road, Greenbelt, MD 20770

The Greenbelt Police Department (GPD) is the primary law enforcement agency servicing a population of 21,972 within 6.5 square miles (17 km^{2}) of the city of Greenbelt.

== Organization ==
The GPD is a nationally accredited law enforcement agency. The current chief of police is Richard Bowers. The GPD has an authorized strength of over 70 officers and is divided into three sections:

- Patrol Division- has sworn 31 officers and is divided within the following:
  - Communications
  - Bike Unit
  - Honor Guard
  - Traffic
  - Crash Reconstruction
- Special Operations- was created in July 1987 with a (then) Tactical Unit and has grown to include the following:
  - Emergency Response Unit (SWAT)
  - K-9
  - Criminal Investigation
  - Evidence Unit (fingerprinting)
  - Narcotics Task Force
  - School Resource (SRO)
- Administrative Services
  - Media Relations

== See also ==
- List of law enforcement agencies in Maryland
- City of Greenbelt, Maryland
- Prince George's County
