= Maryland Transportation Authority Police =

- Abbreviation: MDTA Police

Agency overview
- Formed: 1994 (Origin in 1957)
- Employees: approx. 450 (as of 2026)

Jurisdictional structure
- Operations jurisdiction: Maryland, USA
- General nature: Civilian police

Operational structure
- Headquarters: Dundalk, Maryland
- Officers: approx. 450 (as of 2026)
- Civilians: approx. 100 (as of 2026)
- Agency executive: Colonel Nicholas Augustine, Chief of Police

Facilities
- Detachments: 12

Website
- mdta.maryland.gov/police

The Maryland Transportation Authority Police is the eighth-largest law enforcement agency in the U.S. state of Maryland and is charged with providing law enforcement services on Maryland Transportation Authority highways and facilities throughout the state, in addition to contractual services that are provided at Baltimore–Washington International Thurgood Marshall Airport, and the Port of Baltimore.

== History ==
The Maryland Transportation Authority Police trace their beginnings to the opening of the new Baltimore Harbor Tunnel and the Harbor Tunnel Thruway connecting highways (now part of Interstate 895) which crosses under the Patapsco River of Baltimore's Harbor in 1957, when the municipal "Harbor Tunnel Thruway Special Police Force" was established. In 1971, this force developed a State-authorized Police Academy, Commercial Vehicle Safety Division, police-apprenticeship program, and an Honor/Color Guard. An additional under-harbor tunnel was added in the mid-1980s with the construction of the parallel Fort McHenry tunnel for Interstate 95. In 1998, by act of the Maryland General Assembly the previous Maryland Port Administration Police was abolished and the members were merged into the larger Maryland Transportation Authority Police under the new Maryland Department of Transportation. The new police force assumed law enforcement responsibilities for the Helen Delich Bentley Port of Baltimore facilities including the Canton, Seagirt, Dundalk, Clinton Street, Fairfield and Locust Point Marine Terminals, as well as the downtown Baltimore World Trade Center on East Pratt Street at the "Inner Harbor". Today the MDTA Police force has grown to encompass law enforcement responsibilities at all of Maryland's transportation facilities projects, also including the Baltimore–Washington International Thurgood Marshall Airport, and the Helen Delich Bentley Port of Baltimore.

== Chiefs of Police ==
- Chief Nicholas Augustine, 2026–Present
- Chief Joseph F. Scott, 2024–2026
- Chief Kevin Anderson, 2020–2023
- Chief Jerry Jones, 2015–2020
- Chief Michael Kundrat, 2013–2015
- Chief Marcus L. Brown, 2007–2011
- Chief Gary McLhinney, 2003–2007
- Chief Larry Harmel, 1997–2003
- Chief Edward Hechmer, 1982–1997

== Overview ==
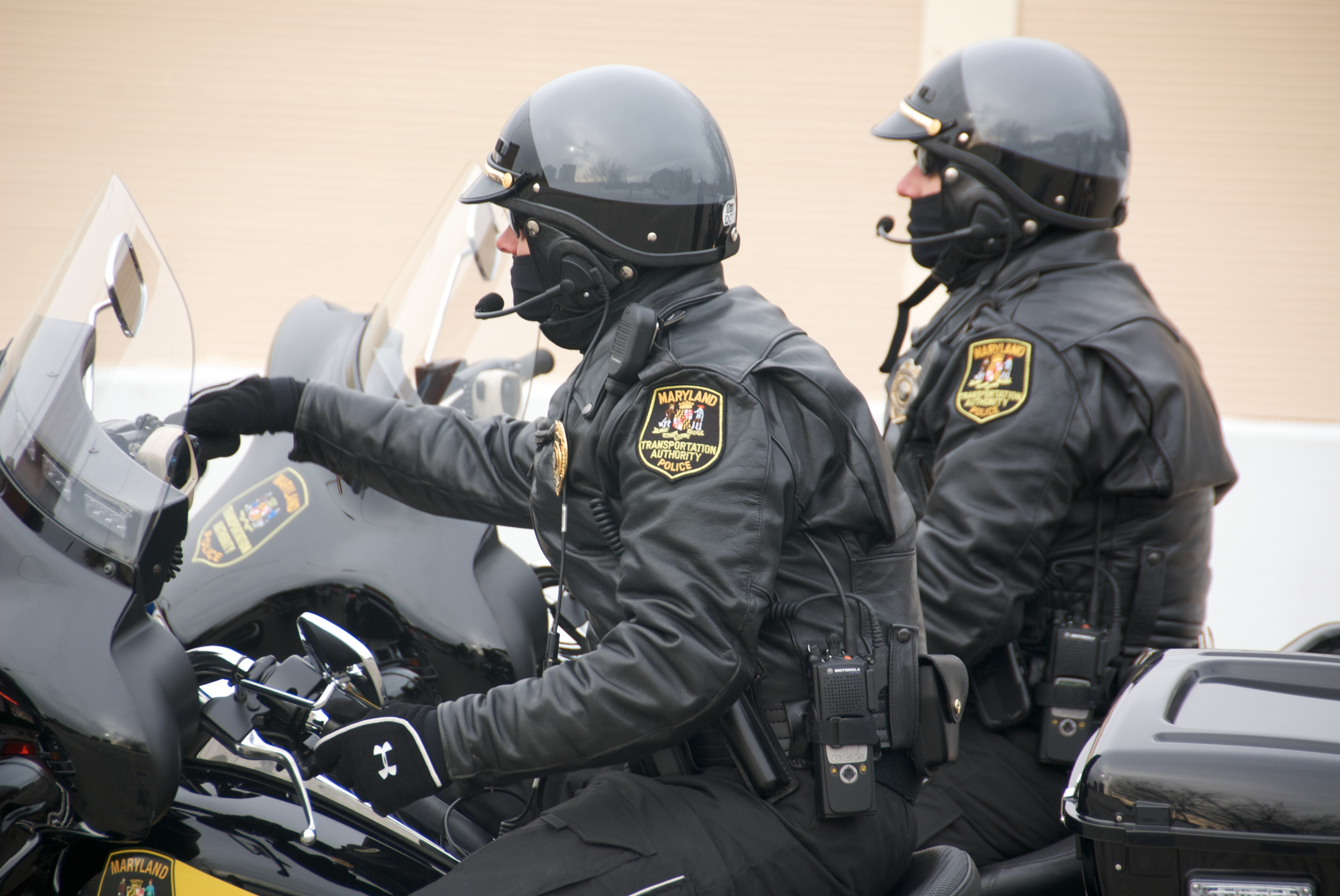
Maryland Transportation Authority Police

The Maryland Transportation Authority Police, the first state law enforcement agency to be nationally accredited in the state of Maryland, is the second-largest state law enforcement agency and the eighth-largest law enforcement agency in Maryland, with approx. 500 sworn officers and 100 civilian law enforcement professionals.

The Maryland Transportation Authority Police provide law enforcement services to some of the most critical transportation infrastructures in the state of Maryland. These areas include all Maryland Transportation Authority highways, such as Interstate 95 within the city of Baltimore north to the Delaware state line, Interstate 895, portions of Interstate 695, U.S. Routes 40, 50, 301, and the Intercounty Connector (MD 200).

In addition to these responsibilities the Maryland Transportation Authority Police also handle the law enforcement services at the Baltimore Washington International/Thurgood Marshall Airport and the Port of Baltimore. The Maryland Transportation Authority Police also provide law enforcement services and inspections related to commercial vehicle truck safety on Interstate 95 (JFK Highway), Interstate 895, Interstate 695, US-50, US-40 and US-301.

The Maryland State Police, under contract with the Maryland Transportation Authority, provides law enforcement services along the John F. Kennedy Memorial Highway (IS 95 from northern Baltimore County to the Delaware state line).

== Organizational structure ==
Special Operations Division

Patrol Division

Support Services Division

Logistics Division

== Rank structure ==
The Maryland Transportation Authority Police is a paramilitary organization with a rank structure similar to the United States military. The ranks of corporal through lieutenant are based on promotional testing. Captains and above are appointed by the chief of police.

The Maryland Transportation Authority Police rank structure is as listed:

Rank	Insignia	Description
Chief Of Police		The Chief of Police for the Maryland Transportation Authority Police currently holds the rank of Colonel. The Chief is the Agency Executive of the Maryland Transportation Authority Police and is appointed by the board members of the Maryland Transportation Authority approved by the Governor for the state of Maryland.
Lieutenant Colonel		The rank of Lieutenant Colonel is appointed by the Chief of Police and generally serves as the Assistant Chief of Police for the agency. However the rank of Lieutenant Colonel may be appointed to more than one person at any given time and may serve in another capacity within the agency.
Major		Majors are responsible for commanding a specific division/bureau within the Maryland Transportation Authority Police.
Captain		The specific responsibilities of a captain vary depending upon where they are assigned within the agency. For example, a captain may be a detachment commander at a specific detachment. Captains also may be assigned to work within another division/bureau of the agency.
Lieutenant		A lieutenant is generally the assistant commander to a detachment. However, lieutenants have held detachment commands as the primary commanding officer. Lieutenants also may be assigned to work within another division/bureau of the agency.
First Sergeant		First Sergeants are generally unit commanders, or assistant detachment commanders. First Sergeants also may be assigned to work within another division/bureau of the agency.
Sergeant		Sergeants serve as shift commanders or duty officers. At smaller detachments sergeants are generally assistant detachment commanders. Sergeants also may be assigned to work within another division/bureau of the agency.
Corporal		Corporals are the first line supervisors and are usually assigned as road supervisors within detachment. In the absence of a sergeant, they may act as the duty officer.
Senior Officer		Officers who complete ten years of satisfactory service are promoted to the rank of Senior Officer (OFC.III)
Officer First Class		Officers who complete two years of satisfactory service are promoted to the rank of Officer First Class (OFC.II).
Officer		Officer Candidates successfully completing the academy and field training are appointed as an Officer (OFC.I).

== Training Academy ==
Members of the Maryland Transportation Authority Police are professional law-enforcement officers who must meet established standards and successfully complete a rigorous training program as required by the Maryland Police Training Commission. Officer candidates receive this training at the Maryland Transportation Authority's Police Training Academy, a fully accredited police-training facility located near the "Francis Scott Key Memorial Bridge" Baltimore Beltway, Interstate 695. Officer candidates are expected to maintain physical and mental discipline throughout the academy.

The standard training course covers subjects such as criminal and motor-vehicle law, accident investigation, first aid, abnormal psychology, traffic control, criminal investigation, defensive tactics, weapons qualifications and court procedures. In addition, college credits are available at the Community College of Baltimore County's Dundalk campus.

Academy students are required to maintain a high academic standing during their seven-month classroom training. Upon graduation, officers will be assigned to field training officers for an additional eight weeks of training. Thereafter, officers are eligible for assignment to any of the Maryland Transportation Authority Police detachments located throughout Maryland.

== Detachments ==
Detachment	Location	Region
Headquarters/Training Academy (Soller's Point)	Baltimore County	Central
Thomas J. Hatem Memorial Bridge	Harford / Cecil Counties (U.S. Route 40)	Northern
John F. Kennedy Memorial Highway	Harford / Cecil Counties ( Interstate 95)	Northern
Commercial Vehicle Safety Unit - J.F.K. Highway	Harford / Cecil Counties (Interstate 95 & US Route 40)	Northern
Central Command/ Fort McHenry/ Baltimore Harbor Tunnels/ Francis Scott Key Bridge	Baltimore, Baltimore, Anne Arundel, Howard Counties, (Interstate 95 & Interstate 895), (Interstate 395 & Martin Luther king Jr Blvd.), (Interstate 695)	Central
Commercial Vehicle Safety Unit Metro	Baltimore, Anne Arundel, (Interstate 95, Interstate 895, Interstate 695 & US Route 50)	Central
Helen Delich Bentley Port of Baltimore	Baltimore	Central
Baltimore-Washington International/Thurgood Marshall Airport	Anne Arundel County	Central
Harry W. Nice Memorial Bridge	Charles County	Southern
William Preston Lane Jr. Memorial Bridge, ("Chesapeake Bay Bridge")	Anne Arundel County / Queen Anne's County	Southern
Intercounty Connector	Montgomery / Prince George's Counties	Southern

== Specialized Units ==
Maryland Transportation Authority Police Specialized Units are:

- Visibility Integrity Prevention Education Recovery (VIPER)
- Motor Unit
- K-9 Unit
- Marine Unit
- Commercial Vehicle Safety Unit (CVSU)
- Commercial Enforcement and Response Team (CERT)
- Criminal Investigations Unit (CIU)
- Internal Affairs Unit (IAU)
- Crisis Negotiations Team (CNT)
- Collision Reconstruction Unit (CRU)
- Special Response Team (SRT)
- Drug Recognition Expert (DRE)
- Bicycle Patrol
- Honor Guard
- Honor Guard Rifle Team
- Information and Technology Law Enforcement Unit (ITLE)
- Recruitment Section
- Public Affairs Unit
- Training Unit

== Equipment ==
Weapons

Maryland Transportation Authority Police Officers are currently issued a Glock 45 9mm, with a red dot sight. ("Safe Action") pistol. Some officers are also issued an 870 Remington 12-gauge shotgun, but all officers are certified to operate both weapons. Additionally officers are issued an ASP collapsible baton, OC Spray, Taser 7, handcuffs, flashlights and a radio.

Patrol Vehicles

The Maryland Transportation Authority Police currently use the police package Chevrolet Tahoe, Ford Police Interceptor (sedan and utility models), Dodge Charger, Chevrolet Impala, and Chevrolet Caprice as their primary patrol vehicles. Chevrolet Express vans are used for prisoner transport. As of July 1, 2025 all sworn MDTA Police Personnel are issued an assigned Personal Patrol Vehicle for on-duty and off-duty use upon completion of Academy and Field Training.

== Maryland Transportation Authority Police Awards ==
The Maryland Transportation Authority Police presents a number of awards to its members for meritorious service. The awards that the Maryland Transportation Authority Police awards to its officers are as follows:

- Award of Excellence
- Life Saving Award
- Distinguished Service Award
- Chief's Commendation
- Unit Commendation
- Motor Carrier Inspector of the Year
- Law Enforcement Supervisor of the Year
- Detachment Law Enforcement Officer of the Year
- Law Enforcement Officer of the Year

== Fallen officers ==
Eight officers have died while on duty.

== See also ==
- List of law enforcement agencies in Maryland
