= Anne Arundel County Sheriff's Office =

Law enforcement arm of the court, in Anne Arundel County, Maryland, US

- Abbreviation: AACOSO

Agency overview
- Formed: 1650

Jurisdictional structure
- Operations jurisdiction: Maryland, USA
- Map of Anne Arundel County Sheriff's Office's jurisdiction
- Area: 588 square miles (1,520 km^{2})
- Population: 510,878

Operational structure
- Headquarters: Annapolis, Maryland
- Agency executives: Everett L. Sesker, Sheriff; Col James Williams, Chief Deputy Sheriff

Website
- http://www.aacounty.org/Sheriff/index.cfm

The Anne Arundel County Sheriff's Office (AACOSO) is the law enforcement arm of the court, serving the citizens of Anne Arundel County, Maryland, population 588,261. All deputy sheriffs are certified law enforcement officials with full authority of arrest. The constitution of Maryland, Article IV, Section 44, establishes the Office of an elected Sheriff in each County and Baltimore City. The duties of the Sheriff are those established by common law, judicial opinion and the Maryland General Assembly. (e.g., Prince George's County V. Aluisi, MD Court of Appeals, June 8, 1999).

== History ==
The AACOSO is the oldest Law Enforcement agency in Anne Arundel County and was organized in 1650. John Norwood was appointed the first sheriff and was paid in pounds of tobacco for services rendered (e.g., serving any writ such as a warrant, tending prisoners, collecting taxes, etc.). In 1776, with the formation of the Maryland Constitution, the sheriff became an elected position with an initial term lasting one year. The term was then changed to three years, then two, and finally four years in 1926 where it remains today.

In 2016, county leaders asked sheriff Ron Bateman to resign after he was charged with assault following a domestic dispute with his wife. He stayed on until 2018.

In 2022, a sergeant allegedly assaulted a woman in a parking lot. Despite being aware of the allegations, the Sheriff's Office took no action. After a few days a deputy informed the Anne Arundel County Police of the incident and the police arrested the sergeant.

Office of the Sheriff Service Record

Dates Served	Sheriff
1658-1663	John Norwood
1663-1664	Samuel Chew
1664-1665	Capt. William Burgess
1665-1666	Richard Ewen
1666-1670	Capt. Thomas Stockett
1670-1673	unknown
1673-1676	Henry Stockett
1676-1678/9	John Welsh
1678/9-1682	Robert ffranklin
1683-1685	George Burgess
1685-1690	Capt. Henry Hanslap
1690-1692	Abel Brown
1692-1694	Benjamin Scrivener
1694-1697	Capt. William Holland
1697-1699	Richard Beard
1699-c.1701	Thomas Reynolds
c. 1701-1705	John Gresham, Jun
1705/6-1708	Josiah Wilson
1708-1711	John Gresham, Jun
1711-1714	Thomas Gassaway
1714-1717	Thomas Reynolds
1714-1718	Benjamin Tasker
1718-1721	Stephen Warman
1721-1723	Henry Lazenby
1723	John Gresham
1724-1725	Zachariah Maccubbin
1725-1726	John Gresham
1726-1727	Daniel Mariartee
1727-1730	James Govane
1731-1733	Zachariah Maccubbin
1733	John Welsh
1733-1736	Nicholas Maccubbin
1736-1739	Zachariah Maccubbin
1739-1742	John Darnell
1742-1745/6	Samuel Smith
1745/6-1748	William Thornton
1748/9-1751	John Gassaway
1751-1755	Maj. Nathan Hammond
1755-1757	John Raitt
1757-1760	Upton Scott
1761-1763	Kensey Johns
1763	Lancelot Jacques
1764-1766	Joseph Galloway
1767-1769	William Stewart
1770-1772	John Clapham
1773-1775	William Noke
1776-1778	Thomas Deale
1778	William Harwood
1778-1779	John Burgess
1779-1782	Capt. Thomas Harwood
1782-1785	Richard Harwood
1785-1788	David Stewart
1788-1791	Benjamin Howard
1791	Nicholas Watkins
1791	Richard Wells
1791	James Williams
1791-1794	William Goldsmith
1794-1797	Richard Harwood
1797-1800	John Welch
1800-1803	Henry Howard
1803-1805	Jasper E. Tilly
1805-1809	John McCeney
1809-1812	John Cord
1812-1815	Solomon Groves
1815-1818	Robert Welch of Benjamin
1818-1821	Benjamin Gaither
1821-1824	William O'Hara
1824-1827	Robert Welch of Benjamin
1827-1830	Richard Iglehart
1830-1833	Bushrod W. Marriott
1833-1836	Robert Welch of Benjamin
1836-1841	John P. Selby
1842-1845	Benjamin T. Pindle
1845-1848	Richard Welch of Benjamin
1848-1851	William Bryan
1851-1853	Nicholas I. Worthington
1853-1855	Thomas Ireland
1855-1856	Ezekiel E. Bell
1856-1859	Edwin W. Duvall
1859-1861	Thomas Ireland
1861-1863	William Bryan
1863-1865	P. M. McCullough
1865-1867	R. S. Woodward
1867-1869	P. Dorsey Carr
1869-1871	Edwin W. Duvall
1871-1873	Henry Chaire
1873-1875	P. Dorsey Carr
1875-1877	Thomas S. Nutwell
1877-1879	J. B. Wells
1879-1881	Thomas S. Nutwell
1881-1883	H. S. Anderson
1883-1885	Joseph O. Fowler
1885-1887	R. P. Sellman
1887-1889	John G. Crane
1889-1891	James S. Armiger
1891-1893	H. Clement Claude
1893-1895	Thomas I. Linthicum
1895-1897	Joseph W. Fowler
1897-1899	Frank S. Revell
1899-1901	John Boure
1901-1903	George T. Beasley
1903-1905	Samuel B. Hardy
1905-1907	Joshua Linthicum
1907-1909	James E. Williams
1909-1911	Frank S. Revell
1911-1913	George T. Beasley
1913-1915	John E. Potee
1915-1917	J. Carson Boush
1917-1919	Joseph H. Bellis
1919-1921	Thomas S. Dove
1921-1923	Harry T. Levely
1923-1926	John Bowie
1926-1930	Michael F. Carter
1930-1934	R. Glenn Prout
1934-1938	Joseph W. Alton
1938-1942	Russell C. Turner
1942-1946	Joseph C. Griscom
1946-1949	Joseph W. Alton
1949-1950	Charles M. Russell
1950-1962	Joseph W. Alton, Jr.
1962-1990	William R. Huggins
1990-1994	Robert G. Pepersack, Sr.
1994-2006	George F. Johnson
2006-2018	Ronald S. Bateman
2018-2022	James Fredericks
2022-	Everett L. Sesker

== Duties ==
The duties of the AACOSO are to enforce writs of the court, maintain Circuit Court warrants for the county, extradite prisoners from foreign jurisdictions, transport prisoners between holding facilities and the courts, and maintain courtroom decorum. The AACOSO is also charged with assisting other law enforcement agencies as needed.

== Organization ==
The current sheriff is Everett L. Sesker, serving his first term. He is the first Black sheriff of Anne Arundel County.

The AACOSO is divided into three bureaus:

- The Bureau of Field Operations

The Bureau of Field Operations is responsible for the oversight of the following sections: Warrant Squads, Civil Squads, Domestic Violence Squad and K9 Squad.

- The Bureau of Court Security

The Bureau of Court Security is responsible the following sections: Transportation Squads and Security Squads.

- The Bureau of Administration

The Bureau of Administration is responsible for the oversight of the following sections: Personnel, Finance, Training, Procurement, Community Relations, Communications and Document Control.

== Rank structure and insignia ==
Title	Insignia	Duties
Sheriff		The sheriff is the head of the Anne Arundel County Sheriff's Office
Colonel		The colonel is the Chief Deputy Sheriff of the Anne Arundel County Sheriff's Office
Captain		Captains are Bureau Commanders
Lieutenant		Lieutenants are Shift Commanders/Assistant Bureau Commanders
Sergeant		Sergeants are first line supervisors.
Corporal		Corporals are usually assigned to Criminal Apprehension, Civil Process, or as Court Officers.
Deputy first class		Deputy first class are usually assigned to Criminal Apprehension, Civil Process, or as Court Officers
Deputy	No insignia	Deputies are usually assigned to Criminal Apprehension, Civil Process, or as Court Officers

== Fallen deputies - killed in the line of duty ==
January 10, 1967 – Deputy Sheriff Clarence Johnson succumbed to inquires sustained in an automobile accident on Ritchie Highway while transporting a prisoner to the Anne Arundel County Jail. The prisoner had previously resisted arrest for service of a bench warrant. Both Deputy Johnson and the prisoner were killed after it was reported that the subject may have begun to struggle with Deputy Johnson during transport. Deputy Johnson was survived by his wife and six children.

August 15, 2022 – Deputy Sheriff Scott C. McArdle had reported to duty for his assigned shift with the Domestic Violence Unit. He began to feel unwell shortly after and immediately sought aid at the Anne Arundel Medical Center. He died during treatment from a heart attack.

== See also ==
- List of law enforcement agencies in Maryland
