= Kent County Sheriff's Office (Maryland) =

Primary law enforcement agency servicing Kent County

- Abbreviation: KCSO

Agency overview
- Formed: 1648

Jurisdictional structure
- Operations jurisdiction: Maryland, U.S.
- Area: 279.43 square miles (723.7 km^{2})
- Population: 19,983
- Legal jurisdiction: Kent County, Maryland
- General nature: Local civilian police

Operational structure
- Deputies: 22, including the sheriff (as of 2022)
- Agency executive: Dennis Hickman, Sheriff

The Kent County Sheriff's Office (KCSO) is the primary law enforcement agency servicing a population of 19,983 people within 279.43 square miles (723.7 km^{2}) of jurisdiction within Kent County located on Maryland's eastern shore. As of 2022, the department has 22 sworn deputies, including the sheriff.

== History ==
The KCSO was created in 1648 with Henry Morgan appointed as the first sheriff.

In 1994, the KCSO had 17 deputies.

In 2003, the KCSO was accredited by the Commission on Accreditation for Law Enforcement Agencies.

== Organization ==
Nationally accredited by the Commission on Accreditation for Law Enforcement Agencies, the KCSO is full-service organization. The current sheriff of the KCSO is Dennis Hickman. The agency is sub-divided into six units:

- Administrative
- Victim Services
- School Resource
- Patrol Division - Consisting of 12 deputies within the Patrol Division, there are three units:
  - K-9 Unit
  - Community Policing Unit
  - Bicycle Patrol Unit
- Services Division
- Kent Bureau of Investigation

The KCSO lacks extensive crime scene investigation capabilities and thus relies on the Maryland State Police for such assistance.

== See also ==
- List of law enforcement agencies in Maryland
