= Aberdeen Police Department (Maryland) =

Coordinates: 39°30′41.49″N 76°09′52.16″W

- Aberdeen Police patch
- Abbreviation: APD

Agency overview
- Formed: 1900; 126 years ago

Jurisdictional structure
- Operations jurisdiction: Maryland, USA
- General nature: Civilian police

Operational structure
- Headquarters: Aberdeen, Maryland
- Agency executive: Henry G. Trabert, Chief Of Police

The Aberdeen Police Department (APD) is the primary police agency servicing a population of 14,130 within 6.4 square miles (17 km^{2}) of the municipality of Aberdeen, Maryland.

== History ==
The Bailiff provided the police function for the Town. Apparently there had been some provision for law enforcement prior the incorporation of the Town because a jail, known as “The Dungeon” had been erected previously at the corner of Howard Street and Walnut Alley. It was a two cell affair constructed of stone; it stood to the rear of what became the Town Hall.

The position of bailiff remained a fixture in the town through the late nineteenth century. The position was held by the following individuals: Charles Thompson, Frank Doyle, John Temple, Charlie Shears, John Bowman and Mack Bowman. The title of bailiff evolved into that of chief of police. In a photograph dated “about 1900” John Temple is identified as chief of police. Appointed in 1919, James B. “Ben” Ray became one of the longest-serving police chiefs in America, retiring in 1965. Ben was something of a character. In the 1950s and 1960s it was not uncommon to see him “walking his beat” in uniform Bermuda shorts, knee-high black socks and carrying a swagger stick.

In 1936 the town erected a stone building at the corner of W. Bel Air Avenue and Philadelphia Boulevard (Rt. 40); its original purpose was to serve as a comfort station for travelers. Apparently the town fathers realized that the building was being under-utilized and moved the town offices and the police department there. The old jail was abandoned in 1948 when new cell and court space was made available in the rear of the firehouse located at W. Bel Air Avenue and Parke Street. The police department took over the remainder of that building when the fire department constructed a larger facility at Rogers and Franklin Streets in 1973.

Through the mid-twentieth century the police department grew as the town's population grew. During World War II the department numbered three; by 1967 the department numbered fifteen full-time officers and three part-time. The chief of police at that time was Chester Roberts. He was succeeded by William P. Krouse, a veteran of the department for over twenty-five years. The next chief was also a veteran officer, Arthur B. “Whitey” Elliott who served until August, 1981. By now the department had grown to thirty-eight officers. Retired Maryland State Police colonel Lemuel Porter took over and remained chief until 1989. He was followed by John R. “Jack” Jolley, a retired US Army major and former provost marshal on the Aberdeen Proving Grounds. During his term of office, Aberdeen went from being a town to becoming a city. Chief Jolley left the department in December, 1994 and was succeeded by Michael Zotos, a retired deputy commissioner from the Baltimore City Police Department. Chief Zotos retired four years later in 1999. Retired MSP captain Randy Rudy became chief of the department in February, 2000. During his tenure the department moved into new facilities located in the north wing of City Hall. In 2006 the department reached its largest authorized complement of 46 sworn officers, but, as a result of the Great Recession of 2008, budget cuts caused a reduction in force.

== Overview ==
The department is currently authorized 43 officers. In October, 2010 Chief Rudy retired from the agency. Captain Henry G. Trabert was appointed Chief, the first officer to rise through the ranks to that position since Arthur Elliott in the 1970s. The Aberdeen Police Department is a full service police agency. It consists of a Patrol Division staffed by 24 patrolmen and overseen by a lieutenant. The Criminal Investigation Division has three full-time investigators and a crime scene technician; three additional detectives (including a K-9) are assigned to the Special Operations Unit and are responsible for street level narcotics and vice investigations. A fourth detective is assigned full-time to the Harford County Task Force, a county wide multi-jurisdictional unit investigating mid- and upper level drug trafficking organizations. CID is supervised by a lieutenant. The Administrative lieutenant is responsible for procurement, quartermaster inventory, fleet maintenance, records management, police communications and numerous other related activities. He supervises and is assisted by an administrative sergeant, who oversees two School Resource officers and crossing guards and a civilian clerical supervisor. The department also deploys a Special Weapons and Tactics Team, an Honor Guard and a Vehicle Accident Reconstruction Team. Under the Office of the Chief is a Deputy Chief, who is responsible for the day-today operations of the department and a civilian CALEA manager. Lieutenant Kirk L. Bane was promoted to captain and named the Deputy Chief of Police in July, 2014. And to think, it all started with a Town Bailiff.

== See also ==
- List of law enforcement agencies in Maryland
- Harford County Sheriff's Office
