= Carroll County Sheriff's Office =

Primary law enforcement agency for Carroll County, MD, US

- Abbreviation: CCSO

Agency overview
- Formed: 1837; 189 years ago

Jurisdictional structure
- Operations jurisdiction: Carroll County, Maryland, USA
- Map of Carroll County Sheriff's Office's jurisdiction
- General nature: Civilian police

Operational structure
- Headquarters: 100 North Court Street, Westminster, Maryland 21157
- Agency executive: Jim DeWees, Sheriff

Website
- http://ccgovernment.carr.org/ccg/sheriff/index.htm

The Carroll County Sheriff's Office (CCSO) was created in 1837 and is the primary law enforcement agency for Carroll County, MD. It services a population of 170,260 people within 449.13 square miles.

== History ==
In 1926, a local newspaper editor described Carroll County sheriffs as "listless" and complained that the Attorney General had taken on too many of their responsibilities.

In 2013, a Major of the Sheriff's Office was charged with misconduct in office after he allegedly gave false testimony in a homicide case.

In 2022, the National Association of School Resource Officers gave the Sheriff's Office the Model Agency Award for its school resource officer program.

== Organization ==
The current Sheriff of the Carroll County Sheriff's Office is Jim DeWees. Sheriff DeWees was elected as Sheriff in November 2014 and is the 58th Sheriff to serve as the Sheriff for the Carroll County Sheriff's Office. The Carroll County Sheriff's Office took over county wide jurisdiction in June 2011. Before June 2011 the Maryland State Police assisted the Carroll County Sheriff's Office with some of the primary duties that would be normally handled by the Sheriff's Office. The Carroll County Sheriff's Office divides the county into two districts: Northern and Southern. Each patrol district is sub-divided into two patrol sectors. There are three bureaus:

Operations Division-

- Patrol Section- Consists of Road Patrol, K-9, Traffic Enforcement, and School Resource Officers.

Support Operations Division-

- Major Crimes Section- provides investigative services for major felonies (e.g., homicide, rape, etc.) through Criminal Investigation. It also manages the Drug Task Force, the Repeat Offender Unit, and the Warrant/Fugitive Team.

Warrant/Fugitive Taskforce - Part of the US Marshall Task Force, also includes Child Support Enforcement

- Child Advocacy and Investigations Center (CCAIC)- Provides victim services, investigates child and adult sex offenses, child pornography cases, and child abuse allegations.
- Court Security Section- Provides security for the District and Circuit courts, as well as prisoner transportation.
- Civil Section- Consists of civilian constables that serve criminal and civil writs.
- Administrative Division- Provides financial services, human resources/recruiting, public information (PIO), and applicant investigations.
- Support Division- Provides service to the Police Academy, vehicle maintenance (Fleet Services), supply, and training

== Specialized Units ==
- Canine Unit (K9)
- Special Enforcement Team
- Community Deputy Program
- Bike Patrol Program
- Crisis Response Team
- Crisis Negotiations Team

== See also ==
- List of law enforcement agencies in Maryland
