= Baltimore City Sheriff's Office =

- Abbreviation: BCSO

Agency overview
- Formed: 1845

Jurisdictional structure
- Operations jurisdiction: Baltimore, Maryland, USA
- Map of Baltimore City Sheriff's Office's jurisdiction
- Area: 92.1 square miles (239 km^{2})
- Population: 620,961
- General nature: Local civilian police

Operational structure
- Headquarters: Baltimore, Maryland
- Agency executive: Sam Cogen, Sheriff

Website
- http://sheriff.baltimorecity.gov

The Baltimore City Sheriff's Office (BCSO) is the law enforcement arm of the Circuit Court of Maryland, serving Baltimore, Maryland. The office is headquartered in Courthouse West of the Baltimore City Circuit Courthouses, which also serves as the sites for Baltimore City branch of the Circuit Court of Maryland.

The Sheriff is an elected office without terms limits. The current Sheriff is Sam Cogen, having been in the position since 2022.

== Functions ==
Baltimore City Deputy Sheriffs have the same full law enforcement powers as officers in the Baltimore City Police Department. As law-enforcement officers, sworn members must meet established standards and successfully complete a rigorous training program as required by the Maryland Police and Correctional Training Commission. The Sheriff is directly responsible to the citizenry, thus only the Sheriff and Deputy Sheriffs have the authority to enforce Civil, Criminal, and Traffic Laws on behalf of the state. All sworn members of the Sheriff's Office are agents of the state of Maryland and thus have authority throughout the entire state, although their direct jurisdictional boundary is the eighth Judicial Circuit of Maryland which is also known as the Circuit Court of Maryland for Baltimore City (prior to the constitutional amendments and court reorganization in the early 1970s, previously known as the "Supreme Bench of Baltimore City").

- Traffic Enforcement - All deputy sheriffs are issued moving violation ticket books and enforce motor vehicle laws. Many deputies have received specialized traffic training and regularly participate in DWI and seatbelt enforcement checkpoints.
- Court Assignment - Deputies assigned to court have the responsibility of maintaining the custody of the prisoners as they are escorted to and from the courtrooms during their trial. Should a jury be requested overnight, a deputy is required to provide 24-hour security, which includes transportation to and from overnight accommodations.
- Court Security Officers are responsible for the security in both Baltimore City Circuit Court buildings (Mitchell and Courthouse East on Battle Monument Square) and the Juvenile Justice Center (on North Gay Street). They provide security to the judges, employees, citizens, and prisoners entering the courthouses. The primary duty of the security officer assigned to court is the safety of the judge. Should an incident occur, the officer is to get the judge to safety and then respond to the disturbance. They also maintain order and decorum in the courtrooms and hallways. Each courthouse is equipped with a metal detector to scan all visitors for weapons and the buildings are regularly patrolled by K9 dogs and officers.
- Accounting Department - Processes and collects all fines and court costs set by the courts.
- Domestic Violence Efforts - A team of deputies and civilian support staff maintain an extremely high service and the arrest rate for the enforcement and service of orders for protection relating to domestic violence. as well as other peace orders.

== History ==
The Baltimore City Sheriff's Office is unique among the other sheriff's offices in Maryland in that it was established with the sole purpose to be the enforcement arm of the court system in Baltimore City. Every other jurisdiction in the colonial Province of Maryland was established with a sheriff who had the responsibility to be fully responsible for the keeping of public peace as derived from the English "Common Law" system. With a growing port was established in 1706 and a town was founded in 1729 and laid out the following year. With the merger of three distinct villages of Jones's Town (1732) with Baltimore Town in 1745 along with Fells Point (1763) annexed in 1773. Recognizing its quick growth, the town was later incorporated as a city in 1797. The position of Sheriff of Baltimore City was created by a constitutional amendment passed in 1844. At this time Baltimore City was still a part of Baltimore County and had been served by the sheriff for the entire County of which Baltimore Town and later City was the county seat (since relocated in 1767 from old Joppa) and the central location of the courts and other law enforcement activities in Baltimore County since it was "erected" (created) in 1659. (Baltimore County Sheriff's Office). In 1845, the Baltimore City Sheriff's Office began operation and the Baltimore City Police Department was later authorized in 1853. Prior to this time a guard force of constables and night watchmen since the early 1780s were authorized to enforce town laws and arrest those in violation. In 1851, by action of the General Assembly of Maryland, the city was separated as a distinct jurisdiction and independent city within the state with the status of a county unto itself. The new county seat was moved to the town of Towson, just north of the new independent City of Baltimore and all county functions were centered there with the construction in 1854 of a new Baltimore County Court House on a square facing Washington Avenue between Pennsylvania and Chesapeake Avenues.

Term	Portrait	Name	Notes
1845-1848		John Kettlewell	
1848-1851		Charles F. Cloud	
1851-1853		John Hayes	
1853-1855		John Hyndes	
1855-1857		Samuel Gaskins	
1857-1859		Thomas Creamer	
1859-1861		George D. Hutton	
1861-1863		Edward R. Sparks	
1863-1865		John J. Daneker	
1867-1869		William Thompson	
1865-1867		Augustus Albert	
1869-1871		John W. Davis	
1871-1873		George P. Kane	
1873-1875		Augustus Albert	
1875-1877		Samuel S. Mills	
1877-1879		Philip Snowden	
1879-1881		Alfred E. Smyrk	
1881-1883		John F. Hunter	
1883-1885		William F. Airey	
1885-1887		H. D. Fledderman	
1887-1889		George May	
1889-1891		George MacCaffray	
1891-1893		Isaac S. Sanner	
1893-1895		Timothy Maloney	
1895-1897		Stephen R. Mason	
1897-1899		Edmund M. Hoffman	
1899-1901		John B. Schwatka	
1901-1903		Samuel G. Davis	
1903-1905		William H. Green	
1905-1907		George W. Padgett	
1907-1909		Robert J. Padgett	
1909-1911		John J. Hanson	
1911-1913		Theodore P. Weis	
1913-1923		Thomas F. McNulty	
1923-1930		John E. Potee	
1930-1963		Joseph C. Deegan	
1963-1974		Frank J. Pelz	
1974-1986		George W. Freeberger	
1986-1989		Shelton J. Stewart	
1989-2022		John W. Anderson	
2022–present		Sam Cogen	

== Sections & Specialty Units ==
=== Field Enforcement Section ===
Baltimore City is divided into 21 districts. Each district is assigned a deputy to serve and execute all legal documents and orders issued for respondents living within these district areas. In addition, deputies are assigned to execute all sheriffs' sales for real property and chattels.

=== District Court Section ===
Deputies in this section are charged with the execution of all procedures originating from the Rent Court including Eviction Orders.

=== Child Support Section ===
Deputies assigned to this section serve and execute all documents received from the Child Support Enforcement Administration which deals with non-support cases.

=== Child Support Warrant Unit ===
Deputies assigned to this unit locate and arrest individuals wanted on Child Support warrants in Baltimore City.

=== Transportation Unit ===
Within this unit deputy sheriff's are responsible for providing transportation for the transfer of prisoners on a daily basis from the sheriff's holding facility to the place of incarceration, to which prisoners have been remanded.

=== Criminal Warrant Unit ===
Deputies are assigned to this unit to execute arrest warrants, such as Failure to Appear (FTA), Violation of Probation (VOP), Body Attachments and Paternity. These warrants are issued out of the Circuit Court of Maryland for Baltimore City.

Miles/Warrant Control- Baltimore City Circuit Court Warrants are housed and entered in a national and local database, which enables every law enforcement agency, throughout the State to verify criminal and warrant information quickly. This unit is staffed at all times by operators working 3 shifts.

=== K-9 Unit ===
Trained explosive detection dogs and their handlers patrol the two Circuit Courthouses and the Baltimore Juvenile Justice Center on a regular basis as part of the Sheriff's Homeland Security initiative.

=== Witness Protection Unit ===
Deputies from this unit assist the Baltimore City State's Attorney Office in the movement, safekeeping and protection of witnesses.

== See also ==
- List of law enforcement agencies in Maryland
- Sheriff
