= Thomas A. Robinson (politician) =

American politician (born 1862)

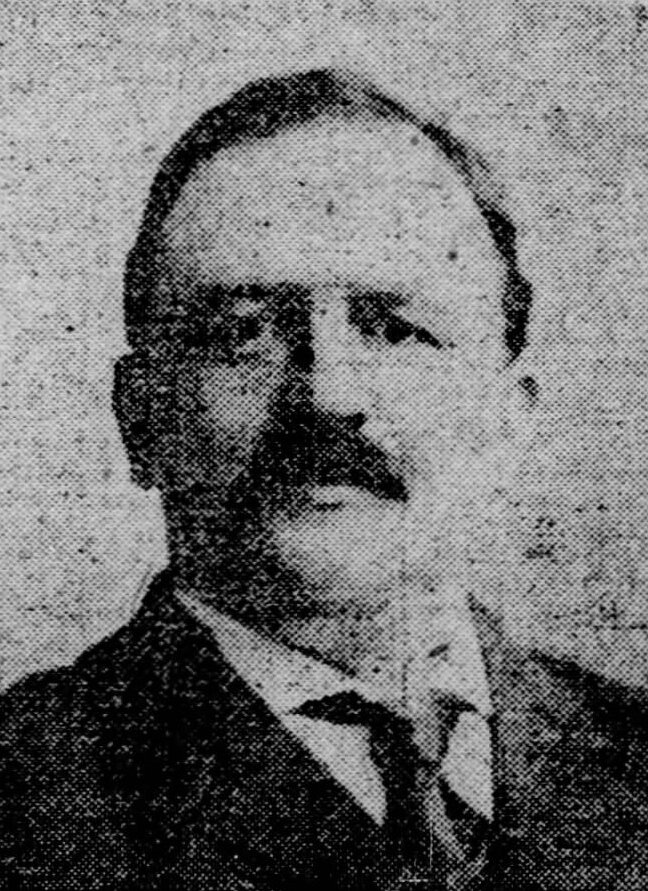
- Robinson in a 1902 newspaper

Member of the Maryland House of Delegates from the 1st district
- In office 1898–1900 Serving with Aquilla A. Baldwin, Emanuel H. Jacobi, William F. Pentz, Frank H. Quast, Chauncey T. Scudder
- Preceded by: Charles W. H. Burns, Charles E. Cunningham, Samuel Smith Ford, John A. Janetzke, George W. Padgett, William H. Schilling
- Succeeded by: Forrest Bramble, George R. Brown, Christopher J. Dunn, Frank J. Gately, August C. Mencke, Harold B. Scrimger

Personal details
- Born: November 22, 1862 Baltimore, Maryland, U.S.
- Party: Republican
- Occupation: Politician

Thomas A. Robinson (born November 22, 1862) was an American politician from Maryland. He served as a member of the Maryland House of Delegates from 1898 to 1900.

== Early life ==
Thomas A. Robinson was born on November 22, 1862, on South Ann Street in Baltimore, Maryland, to Sarah J. and William Robinson. His father was general manager of the Baltimore and Ohio Railroad Iron and Steel Works in Cumberland. Robinson attended public schools in Baltimore.

== Career ==
Robinson was senior member of the oyster business T. A. Robinson & Co. He was cashier of the clerk's office of the Court of Common Pleas for three years.

Robinson was a Republican. He served as a member of the Maryland House of Delegates, representing the 1st district, from 1898 to 1900. He was chairman of the committee on Chesapeake Bay and tributaries and a member of the ways and means and organization committees. He was a member of the Republican State Central Committee for six years. In 1901, he was elected as clerk of Circuit Court No. 2 in Baltimore. He served as clerk until his retirement in November 1907. He ran again for clerk of Circuit Court No. 2 in 1915, but lost.

== Personal life ==
Robinson lived at South Ann Street in Baltimore throughout his life.
