= Garrett County Sheriff's Office =

Primary law enforcement agency in Garrett County, Maryland, US

The Garrett County Sheriff's Office (GCSO) is the primary law enforcement agency servicing 30,097 people within 647.96 square miles (1,678.2 km^{2}) of jurisdiction within Garrett County, MD.

== History ==
The GCSO was created in 1872 with Thomas Coddington elected as the first sheriff. In over 130 years, there has only been one execution with the county. John Herbert Smith was convicted of 1st degree murder and put to death by hanging on November 16, 1883.

On January 18, 1979, Deputy David G. Livengood was killed in the line of duty while responding to a silent alarm at a military surplus store in Oakland, MD.

== Organization ==
The agency is currently headed by Sheriff Bryson Meyers. The GCSO currently has 30 sworn law enforcement personnel (including the sheriff), and is organized into patrol, civil service, and courthouse security.

=== Garrett County Detention Center ===
The GCSO is also responsible for housing, controlling, and transporting inmates at the Garrett County Detention Center. The detention center has a capacity of 64 inmates (including 8 females and 4 juveniles). The detention center holds inmates serving time of 18 months or less.

== See also ==
- List of law enforcement agencies in Maryland
