= Cecil County Sheriff's Office =

Primary law enforcement agency in Cecil County, Maryland, US

- Abbreviation: CCSO

Agency overview
- Formed: 1674; 352 years ago

Jurisdictional structure
- Area: 348.13 square miles (901.7 km^{2})
- Population: more than 100,000
- Legal jurisdiction: Cecil County, Maryland
- General nature: Local civilian police

The Cecil County Sheriff's Office (CCSO) is the primary law enforcement agency servicing a population of more than 100,000 people within Cecil County, Maryland's 348.13 square miles (901.7 km^{2}). The CCSO was established in 1674 and is responsible for the protection of life and property, enforcing orders of the court, and maintaining the detention facility for Cecil County.

== History ==
In 1676, sheriff Charles James was impeached for perjury.

In 1905, Cecil Kirk was elected sheriff. The Principio farmer moved his family to Elkton, as the elected lawman lived above the jail. His many duties included keeping criminals behind bars, serving the courts, and enforcing the law. To perform all these duties, Sheriff Kirk was assisted by one deputy, Myron Miller.

In 1968, the Cecil County Commissioners provided the Sheriff's Office with automobiles. For the first time in the history of the Constitutional Office, Sheriff Thomas H. Mogle, Jr. and his four deputies had two police vehicles. Before this the officers used their personal cars, and the county reimbursed them for mileage.

== Organization ==
The current sheriff is Scott Adams. Sheriff Adams is the first sheriff in the history of the agency to start his law enforcement career as a member of the Cecil County Sheriff's Office. The Chief Deputy is Gerald Widdoes, Esq. The agency is divided into three sections:

- Law Enforcement- includes patrol, criminal investigations division (CID), K-9, School Resource Officers, Community Resources (Community Policing) Street Level Crime and Civil. This division is under the command of Major George Stanko
- Corrections- consists of housing, controlling, and transportation of inmates. This division is under the command of Major Matthew Carr
- Community Corrections consists of the management and partial housing of adult criminal subjects that continue to work in their respective careers while serving their term of incarceration. Prisoners not otherwise employed are placed on work details.

== See also ==
- List of law enforcement agencies in Maryland
