= George W. Padgett =

American politician (1858–1916)

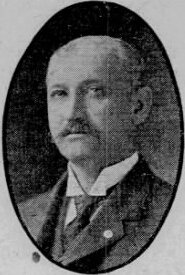
- Padgett in a 1908 newspaper

Sheriff of Baltimore
- In office 1905–1907
- Preceded by: William H. Green
- Succeeded by: Robert J. Padgett

Member of the Maryland House of Delegates from the 1st district
- In office 1896–1898 Serving with Charles W. H. Burns, Charles E. Cunningham, Samuel Smith Ford, John A. Janetzke, William H. Schilling
- Preceded by: Samuel E. Atkinson, Edward D. Fitzgerald, William H. B. Fusselbaugh, Joseph W. Hazell, George E. Keenan, George A. Vernetson
- Succeeded by: Aquilla A. Baldwin, Emanuel H. Jacobi, William F. Pentz, Frank H. Quast, Thomas A. Robinson, Chauncey T. Scudder

Personal details
- Born: February 1, 1858 Baltimore, Maryland, U.S.
- Died: December 24, 1916 (aged 58) Baltimore, Maryland, U.S.
- Resting place: Loudon Park Cemetery
- Party: Republican
- Spouse: Theresa Florence Schoolden (m. 1878)
- Children: 4
- Education: Baltimore City College; Maryland Institute College of Art
- Occupation: Businessman; politician

George W. Padgett (February 1, 1858 – December 24, 1916) was an American politician and businessman from Maryland. He served as a member of the Maryland House of Delegates from 1896 to 1898. He later served as sheriff of Baltimore from 1905 to 1907.

== Early life ==
George W. Padgett was born on February 1, 1858, on Gay Street near Aisquith in Baltimore, to Esther and W. H. Padgett. He was educated in public schools and later graduated from Baltimore City College. He then took a course in mechanical drawing at the Maryland Institute College of Art.

== Career ==
Padgett worked in his father's fish and seafood business. After his father died, he continued his business and later became a partner with his brother John R. Padgett. In 1886, Padgett and William F. Stone formed the Pioneer Republican Association of the Eighth Ward of Baltimore. He served as its president. The group would later be absorbed into the Union League Club.

In 1895, Padgett was elected as a Republican to the Maryland House of Delegates. He represented district 1 in the body from 1896 to 1898. In 1896, he was made Republican executive in the 8th ward and was chairman of the Republican City Central Committee.

In 1905, Padgett was elected as sheriff of Baltimore. He was succeeded by his cousin Robert J. Padgett. He later ran for clerk of the Criminal Court and lost the election. In July 1910, he was appointed as head of the United States Marshal's office in Baltimore, succeeding John F. Langhammer. He served as treasurer of the Monumental Printing Company until his death.

== Personal life ==
Padgett married Theresa Florence Schoolden in 1878. They had three daughters and one son, Mrs. A. B. Wright, Mrs. R. F. Holdefer, Blanche E., and William H.

Padgett died of Bright's disease on December 24, 1916, at his home on North Broadway in Baltimore. He was buried in Loudon Park Cemetery.
