= Wicomico County Sheriff's Office =

Primary law enforcement agency servicing Wicomico County, Maryland, US

Agency overview
- Formed: 1867
- Employees: 142

Jurisdictional structure
- Operations jurisdiction: Wicomico, Maryland, USA
- Map of Wicomico County Sheriff's Office's jurisdiction
- Area: 400 square miles (1,000 km^{2})
- Population: 102,923
- General nature: Local civilian police

Operational structure
- Headquarters: Salisbury, Maryland
- Deputys: 91
- Civilian Personnels: 51
- Agency executives: Michael A. Lewis, Sheriff; Gary Baker, Chief Deputy

Website
- http://www.wicomicosheriff.com/

The Wicomico County Sheriff's Office (WCSO) is the primary law enforcement agency servicing Wicomico County, Maryland. The WCSO was established in 1867 and is responsible for the protection of life and property, enforcing orders of the court, and maintaining the detention facility.

The current sheriff is Mike A. Lewis. Lewis has attracted national news attention for stating that he will not enforce state gun bans, and proclaiming Wicomico County a "Second Amendment sanctuary". He is a "Sheriff Fellow" of the Claremont Institute.

== Organization ==
The agency is divided into two bureaus with many divisions:

- Sheriff deputy's patrol car
  Special Operations Bureau
  - Budget and Finance Division
  - Internal Affairs Division
  - Administrative Hearings Section
  - Human Resources Division
  - Sheriff's Emergency Response Team
  - Polygraph/VSA Section
  - Administrative Resources Division
  - Special Investigations Division
- Field Operations Bureau
  - Road Patrol Division
  - Judicial Protection Division
  - School Resource Division

== History ==
In late 2022, Sheriff's Deputy Steven Abreu was arrested and charged with nine counts of first degree rape against a total of five women, using his power to assault them while on duty. An affidavit filed against Abreu accused him of manipulating his vehicle and body-worn cameras during the interactions.

Since 1867, there have been 41 elected sheriffs:

Sheriffs of Wicomico County
Name	From	To
William Howard	1867	1869
John Johnson	1869	1871
William Twilley	1871	1873
William Moore	1873	1875
L. R. Dorman	1875	1877
Joshua Trader	1877	1879
William Moore	1879	1881
V.J. Collier	1881	1883
William Gordy	1883	1885
E. L. Austin	1885	1887
Isaac White	1887	1889
James Jones	1889	1891
Thomas Roberts	1891	1893
J. W. Farlow	1893	1895
James Johnson	1895	1897
John Dashiell	1897	1899
Jesse Bratton	1899	1901
George Fooks	1901	1903
William Gillis	1903	1905
Elmer Bradley	1905	1907
W W. Larmore	1907	1909
Josiah Kelley	1909	1911
Roy E. Smith	1911	1913
William Brary	1913	1915
William Dryden	1915	1917
James Chatham	1917	1919
William W Lawrence	1919	1921
John H. Farlow	1921	1923
G. Murray Phillips	1923	1926
Ralph C. Duffy	1926	1930
G. Murray Phillips	1930	1934
Charles H. Truitt	1934	1938
Marvin B. Gordy	1938	1942
Leroy Brewington	1942	1946
Jesse M. Pollitt	1946	1958
Samuel Graham	1958	1968
Eugene Carey	1968	1970
William Shockley	1970	1982
John Baker	1982	1984
R. Hunter Nelms	1984	2007
Michael A. Lewis	2007	

== See also ==
- List of law enforcement agencies in Maryland
