= Worcester County Sheriff's Office =

Primary law enforcement agency of Worcester County, Maryland, US

The Worcester County Sheriff's Office (WCSO) is the primary law enforcement agency of Worcester County, and serves a population of 46,543 residents in 473 square miles (1,230 km^{2}) of Worcester County, Maryland. The current sheriff is Matt Crisafulli, having been first elected to the office in 2018.

== History ==
The WCSO was created when Worcester County was created from a section of Somerset County on December 10, 1742. John Martin was appointed first sheriff of the new county and placed his office in the county courthouse. The courthouse (and the Sheriff's Office) subsequently burned down twice (once in 1834 and again 1893).

The Worcester County Sheriff's Office has a Civil Division, Patrol Division, Criminal Bureau of Investigation, Criminal Enforcement Unit, K-9 Unit, Collision Reconstruction Unit, and a School Safety Unit.
