= Ocean City Police Department (Maryland) =

Full-time-service law enforcement agency

Coordinates: 38°23′19″N 75°4′7″W

- Patch of Ocean City Police Department
- Abbreviation: OCPD

Agency overview
- Formed: 1898; 128 years ago
- Employees: 157
- Volunteers: 12
- Annual budget: $ 28,043,463

Jurisdictional structure
- Area: 36.4 square miles
- Population: 7,031
- General nature: Local civilian police

Operational structure
- Headquarters: Public Safety Building
- Sworn members: 130

Facilities
- Police Canines: 5
- Police Horses: 5

The Ocean City Police Department (OCPD) is a full-time-service law enforcement agency providing police services to a population of 7,031 people within 36.4 square miles (94 km^{2}) of the municipality of Ocean City, MD.

== History ==
The OCPD began its tenure in the summer of 1898 with the appointment of a single officer, Cyrus Purnell. In 1900, the mayor and town council approved the expansion of the department to include two more officers and the appointment of Purnell to the position of chief of police. Because of its summertime population swell, the OCPD historically has hired summertime police to supplement its full-time force. In 1965, with the professionalization of the department, the town's officers were attending an officially sanctioned "police academy." This "academy" had officers attending formal classes twice weekly for three weeks which totaled 18 hours of instruction. In contrast, today's police recruits attend the Eastern Shore Criminal Justice Academy for 24 weeks with a total of over 800 hours of instruction.

== Equipment ==
Full time sworn officers employed with the Ocean City Police Department carry the Walther PDP (Service Pistol) which is a 9×19mm Parabellum semi-automatic pistol designed in 2021 by Walther Arms as a replacement for the Walther PPQ. Their duty gun is also mounted with an Aimpoint Acro red dot optic.

== Organization ==
The current chief of police is Raymond J. Austin. Apart from traditional duties of 9-1-1 response and traffic enforcement, the OCPD has other specialized units:

- Quick Response Team (SWAT)
- Traffic Safety Unit
- Bike Unit
- K-9 Unit
- Mounted Unit
- Crisis Negotiation Team
- Breath Test Operator (Intox)
- Defensive Tactics Unit
- Firearms Training Unit
- Emergency Vehicle Operations Unit
- Drug Recognition Expert
- Narcotics/Vice Unit
- Major Crimes Detectives Unit
- Domestic Violence Unit
- Criminal Intelligence Unit
- Crime Analysis Unit
- Forensic Services Unit

== See also ==
- List of law enforcement agencies in Maryland
