= Maryland Office of the Comptroller =

Coordinates: 39.301312°N 76.622047°W

The Maryland Office of the Comptroller is a state agency charged with the fiscal responsibilities of the state of Maryland. It is the state equivalent of the United States Internal Revenue Service.

== Organization ==
- The chief executive officer is the comptroller, which is an elected position of four years.
  - The current Comptroller of Maryland is Brooke Lierman (D), currently serving her term (2023–present).
  - The comptroller appoints two deputy comptrollers and a chief of staff.
- The Field Enforcement Unit (FEU) is the enforcement arm of the office. The FEU employs state agents, who are fully certified police officers, comparable to IRS agents.
  - The Field Enforcement Unit enforces the laws of the State of Maryland as it pertains to the following: alcoholic beverages, tobacco, motor fuels, business licenses, and the sales and use tax.
