= Bel Air Police Department =

Police department in Bel Air, Maryland, US

Coordinates: 39°32′19.69″N 76°20′53.76″W

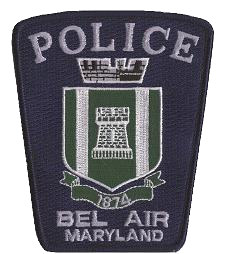
- Bel Air Police Patch

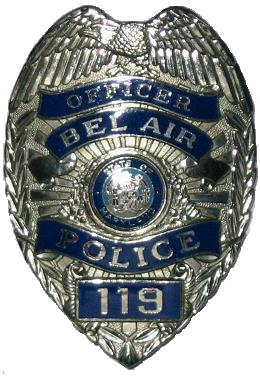
- Shield of the Bel Air Police Department
- Common name: Bel Air Police Department
- Abbreviation: BAPD
- Motto: We Value and Protect Life and Property

Agency overview
- Formed: 1874; 152 years ago
- Preceding agency: Municipal Police

Jurisdictional structure
- Operations jurisdiction: Bel Air, Maryland, USA
- Population: 10,264 (2014)
- Legal jurisdiction: Incorporated Bel Air, MD
- General nature: Local civilian police

Operational structure
- Headquarters: 39 N. Hickory Avenue
- Agency executives: Charles A. Moore, Chief of Police; Major David Hughes, Deputy Chief

Website
- BAPD official site: www.belairmd.org/departments/police.asp

The Bel Air Police Department (BAPD) is the public police department of Bel Air, Maryland, the county seat of Harford County. Its offices are at 39 North Hickory Avenue, Bel Air. BAPD is Bel Air's primary law enforcement agency. It was established in 1874.

== Chief ==
Charles A. Moore Overseeing the department is Charles Moore, lifelong Harford County resident and former Maryland State Police captain.

== Divisions ==
The department consists of the following Divisions & Specialized Units:

- Patrol
- Criminal Investigations Division
- Narcotics Task Force*
- K-9
- SWAT*
- Training Division
- Community / School Policing
- Honor Guard
- Communications
- Records
- Parking Enforcement
- Cadet Program
- Auxiliary Unit
- Explorer Post #9010

*The Narcotics Task Force & SWAT Team are both multi-jurisdictional and composed of members from the Bel Air Police Department and other local police agencies.

== Fleet ==
The Bel Air Police Department utilizes a patrol fleet of Chevrolet Impalas, Chevy Trailblazers and Chevy Tahoes. Motorcycle: Harley Davidson Electra Glide. Incident Command Vehicle: Ford E350.

In the fall of 2012, the Bel Air Police Department began purchasing Ford Police Interceptors which are now built with the Taurus chassis and body. With the new vehicles, BAPD also changed the color scheme to black with white lettering, different from the traditional white with green stripes.

See picture.

== Rank structure and insignia ==
To promote within the department, members must perform a written exam and an oral board. Based on scores in both categories, a member will be selected for the open position. The process is similar for lateral positions, i.e. Detective, Community Police Officer, K-9 Handler, etc. Below are sworn personnel ranks used by the Bel Air Police Department. The rank insignia are worn on the collar, or the sleeve just below the department patch. Although not currently in use, the department also recognizes the lieutenant rank.

Title	Insignia	Duties
Chief		Directs Police Department
Deputy Chief (D/C)		Patrol & Operations Commander
Lieutenant		Intermediate supervisory rank recognized but not actively used
Sergeant (SGT)		Specialized Unit / Shift Supervisor
Corporal (CPL)		First Line Supervisor
Officer First Class (OFC)		Road Patrol / Specialized Units
Detective (DET)		Investigates Serious Crime
Officer (OFF)		Road Patrol

== Website ==
The official site of the BAPD: www.belairmd.org/departments/police.asp
