= Harford County Sheriff's Office =

Second largest sheriff's office in Maryland, US

The Harford County Sheriff's Office (HCSO) is the largest sheriff's office in Maryland and is the primary law enforcement agency servicing a population of 241,402 people within 440.35 square miles (1,140.5 km^{2}) within Harford County, Maryland.

== History ==
The HCSO was created on March 22, 1774, after an act of the Maryland General Assembly in 1773 as Baltimore County was divided in half creating the new county of Harford. Thomas Miller was appointed the first sheriff by the Lord Proprietor of the Province, Henry Harford (the county's namesake). Although initially appointed, all subsequent Sheriffs were elected to two-year terms until 1914 when the term was extended to four years.

In 2016, the Sheriff's Office joined ICE's 287(g) program.

In 2022, Harford County deputies fatally shot a suicidal man: under state law, police killings must be investigated by the state attorney general's office. The attorney general stated that Sheriff Jeffrey Gahler was impeding the investigation, and was eventually forced to obtain a restraining order against him so the investigation could continue.

== Organization ==
The current sheriff is Jeff Gahler. The HCSO employs over 500 sworn and civilian support staff and has three basic duties: general law enforcement, court-order enforcement, and correctional services. The HCSO also has a myriad of special operations such as K-9, SWAT, and Accident Investigation among others.

In 2013, the sheriff's office opened an aviation unit with the granting of a Bell OH-58 helicopter. In 2015 the aviation program was discontinued.

== Rank structure and insignia ==
| Title | Insignia | Duties |
|---|---|---|
| Sheriff | | The sheriff is the Director of Harford County Sheriff's Office |
| Colonel | | The colonel is Deputy Director of Harford County Sheriff's Office |
| Major | | Majors are Bureau Chiefs |
| Captain | | Captains are Precinct/Division Commanders |
| Lieutenant | | Lieutenants are Unit/Shift Commanders |
| Sergeant | | Sergeants are Specialty Unit/Sector Commanders |
| Corporal | | Corporals are First Line Supervisors |
| Deputy first class | | Deputy first class are usually assigned to Road Patrol, Civil Process, or as Court Officers |
| Detective | | |
| Deputy | | |

== See also ==
- List of law enforcement agencies in Maryland
