= Maryland Police and Correctional Training Commissions =

State oversight agency for all law enforcement and correctional agencies in Maryland

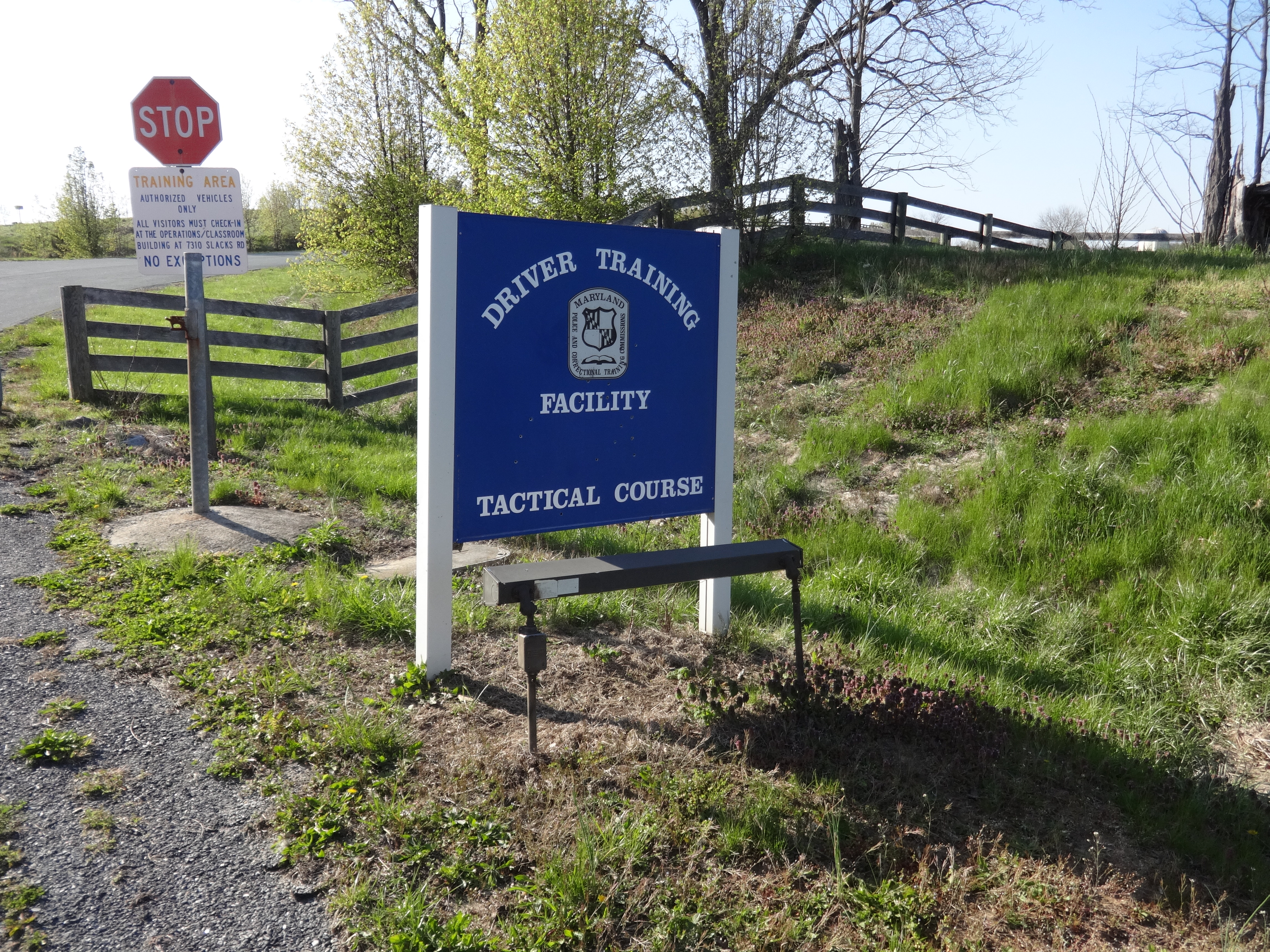
Driving Training Facility, Police & Correctional Training, April 2016.

Headquartered in Sykesville, MD, the Maryland Police And Correctional Training Commissions (MPCTC) is a state oversight agency for all law enforcement agencies in Maryland.

== Duties ==
The MPCTC is responsible for setting minimum hiring standards as well as training objectives for all personnel hired by law enforcement agencies in Maryland. The MPCTC also maintains training records, mandates in-service training, and operates the Maryland Natural Resources Police Training Academy.

== History/Authority ==
The MPCTC was created in 1966 by an act of legislation by the Maryland General Assembly (Ann. Code of Md., Art. 41, §4-201. In 1971, following the police lead, correctional organizations encouraged the creation of a Correctional Training Commission, Ann. Code of Md., Correctional Services Article, §8-201 et seq.) Per the afore mentioned articles, the MPCTC is authorized by the Maryland Department of Public Safety and Correctional Services to govern law enforcement services within the boundaries of the state.
