= Maryland Route 239 =

State highway in Maryland, United States

Maryland Route 239
- Bushwood Wharf Road

Route information
- Maintained by MDSHA
- Length: 1.64 mi (2.64 km)
- Existed: 1927–present

Major junctions
- West end: Dead end at the Wicomico River
- MD 520 near Bushwood
- East end: MD 242 near Bushwood

Location
- Country: United States
- State: Maryland
- Counties: St. Mary's

Highway system
- Maryland highway system; Interstate; US; State; Scenic Byways
← MD 238	→ MD 242

Maryland Route 239 (MD 239) is a state highway in the U.S. state of Maryland. Known as Bushwood Wharf Road, the state highway runs 1.64 miles (2.64 km) from a dead end at the Wicomico River east to MD 242 near Bushwood in western St. Mary's County. MD 239 was constructed in the late 1920s.

== Route description ==
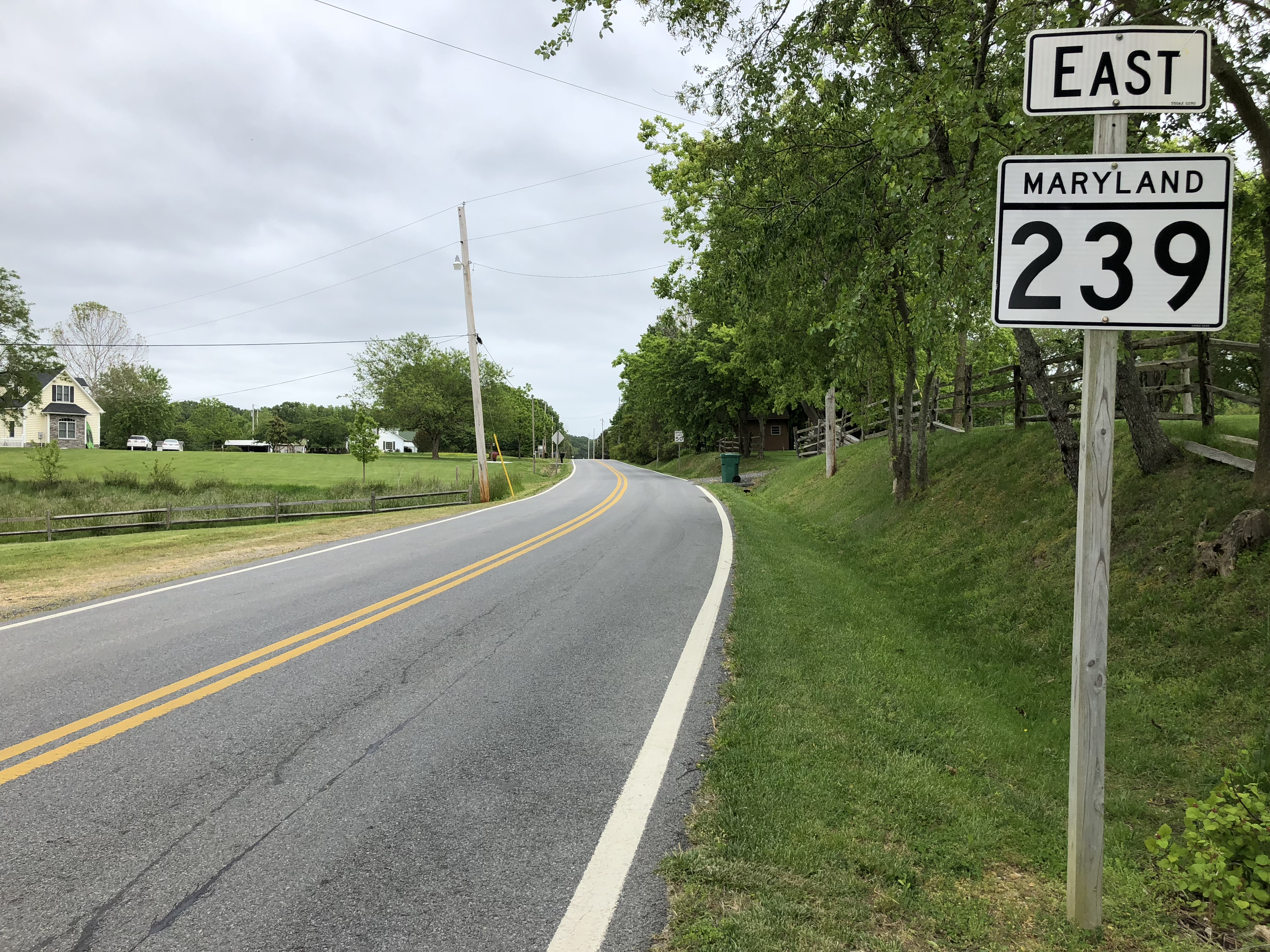
View east from the west end of MD 239 at the Wicomico River

MD 239 begins at a dead end next to a boat ramp on Bushwood Cove of the Wicomico River at a spot historically known as Bushwood Wharf. The state highway heads east as a 18-foot (5.5 m) two-lane undivided road past the historic home Ocean Hall located to the south. At Bushwood Road, MD 239 curves to the southeast, passing through farmland and crossing Whites Neck Creek before intersecting the northern terminus of MD 520 (Whites Neck Road). MD 239 continues east to its own terminus at MD 242 (Colton Point Road).

== History ==
MD 239 was constructed as a 15-foot (4.6 m) gravel road starting in 1926. The state highway was built from MD 242 to Bushwood Road in 1927 and to the western terminus on the Wicomico River in 1928. MD 239 was widened and resurfaced with asphalt in 1956. The state highway has changed very little since then.

== Junction list ==
The entire route is in Bushwood, St. Mary's County.

mi	km	Destinations	Notes
0.00	0.00	Dead end at Wicomico River	Western terminus
1.33	2.14	MD 520 south (Whites Neck Road)	Northern terminus of MD 520
1.64	2.64	MD 242 (Colton Point Road) – Clements, Coltons Point	Eastern terminus
1.000 mi = 1.609 km; 1.000 km = 0.621 mi
