= Hurry =

Hurry may refer to:

- Hurry (EP), a 2001 EP by Tin Foil Phoenix
- Hurry (band), an indie rock band from Philadelphia, Pennsylvania
- Hurry (surname)
- Hurry, Maryland, a community in the United States
- Hurry Inlet in Greenland
- Hurrying, a child employed in a coal mine to transport coal
- Hurry, a curling term
- Quarterback hurry, a type of defensive pressure in American football

== See also ==
- Hurri (disambiguation)
