= Maryland Route 520 =

State highway in Maryland, United States

Maryland Route 520
- Whites Neck Road

Route information
- Maintained by MDSHA
- Length: 2.61 mi (4.20 km)
- Existed: 1933–present

Major junctions
- South end: Dead end near Bushwood
- North end: MD 239 near Bushwood

Location
- Country: United States
- State: Maryland
- Counties: St. Mary's

Highway system
- Maryland highway system; Interstate; US; State; Scenic Byways
← MD 518	→ MD 521

Maryland Route 520 (MD 520) is a state highway in the U.S. state of Maryland. Known as Whites Neck Road, the state highway runs 2.61 miles (4.20 km) from a dead end at a boat ramp north to MD 239 near Bushwood in western St. Mary's County. MD 520 was constructed in 1933.

== Route description ==
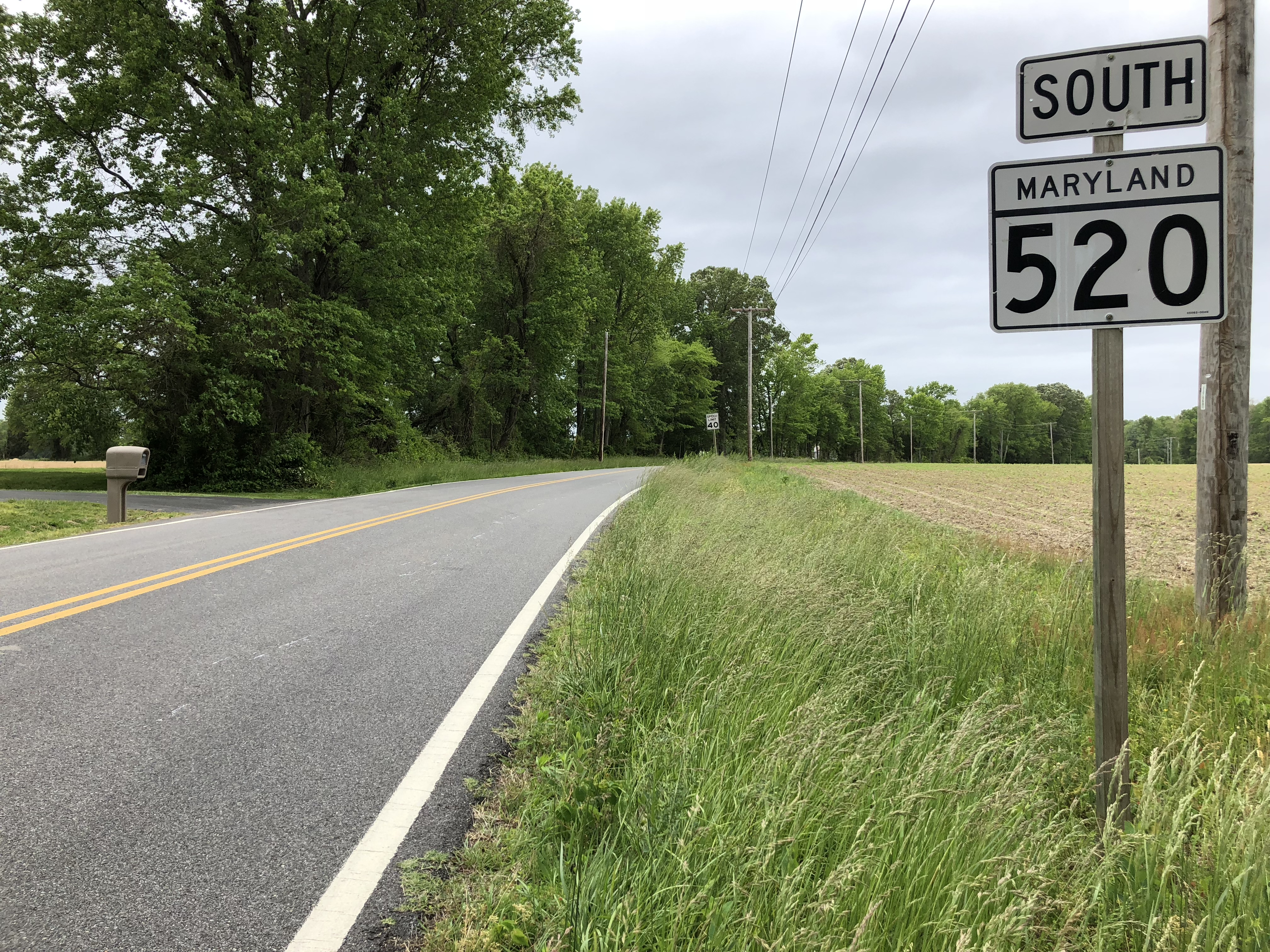
View south from the north end of MD 520 at MD 239 in Bushwood

MD 520 begins at a boat ramp at the southern end of Whites Neck adjacent to the mouth of Whites Neck Creek at St. Catherine Sound, an embayment of the Wicomico River. The 18-foot (5.5 m) wide two-lane undivided state highway heads west then north through farmland. MD 520 veers northeast through a forested area before crossing Whites Neck Creek and reaching its northern terminus at MD 239 (Bushwood Wharf Road) near the community of Bushwood.

== History ==
MD 520 was constructed as a gravel road in 1933. The state highway was widened and resurfaced with bituminous concrete in 1956. MD 520 has changed very little since then.

== Junction list ==
The entire route is in Bushwood, St. Mary's County.

mi	km	Destinations	Notes
0.00	0.00	Dead end at boat ramp	Southern terminus
2.61	4.20	MD 239 (Bushwood Wharf Road)	Northern terminus
1.000 mi = 1.609 km; 1.000 km = 0.621 mi
