= St. Ignatius Roman Catholic Church (St. Inigoes, Maryland) =

Historic church in Maryland, United States

- U.S. National Register of Historic Places
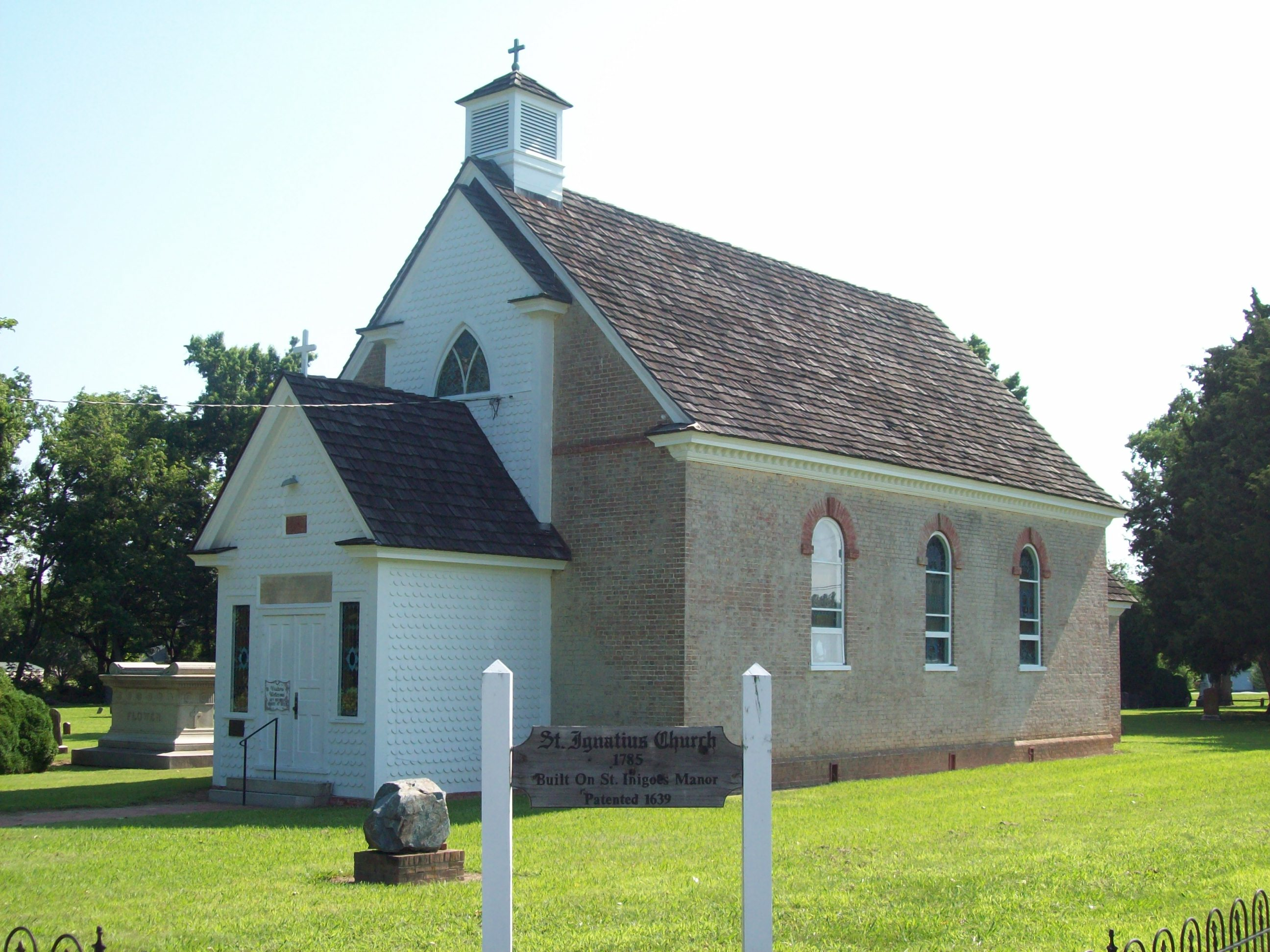
- St. Ignatius Roman Catholic Church, July 2009

- Location within Maryland Location within the United States
- Nearest city: St. Inigoes, Maryland
- Coordinates: 38°9′1.2″N 76°25′25.0″W
- Built: 1785
- NRHP reference No.: 75002086
- Added to NRHP: November 03, 1975

St. Ignatius Roman Catholic Church, also known as St. Inigoes Church or The Cove Church, is a historic Catholic parish located in St. Inigoes, St. Mary's County, Maryland. It is a direct descendant of Maryland's first Catholic chapel, in St. Mary's City, whose communicants formed the first nucleus of American Catholicism. The parish fell under the umbrella of the first establishment of religious freedom in America by George Calvert and his sons, who established the Maryland colony as a refuge for persecuted Catholics.

St. Ignatius and its adjacent burial ground are situated on about two acres of land that are enclosed within a late 19th-century iron fence. The church was constructed between 1785 and 1787, with the sacristy added in 1817. The church walls are 21 inches thick, of brick laid in Flemish bond. Atop the roof is a small wooden belfry that in 1933 replaced a larger one in this same location.

The church was listed on the National Register of Historic Places in 1975.

== Colonial relics ==
The church contains artifacts from the original "The Ark" and "The Dove" sailing ships, which bore the first settlers to the Maryland colony in 1633–34.

== Stained glass depiction of local Indian chief in battle ==
The church also has a very old stained glass depiction of the local paramount Indian Chief in battle with rival Indians. That Chief later converted to Christianity and was a member of the parish in the 1640s.

== Gallery ==
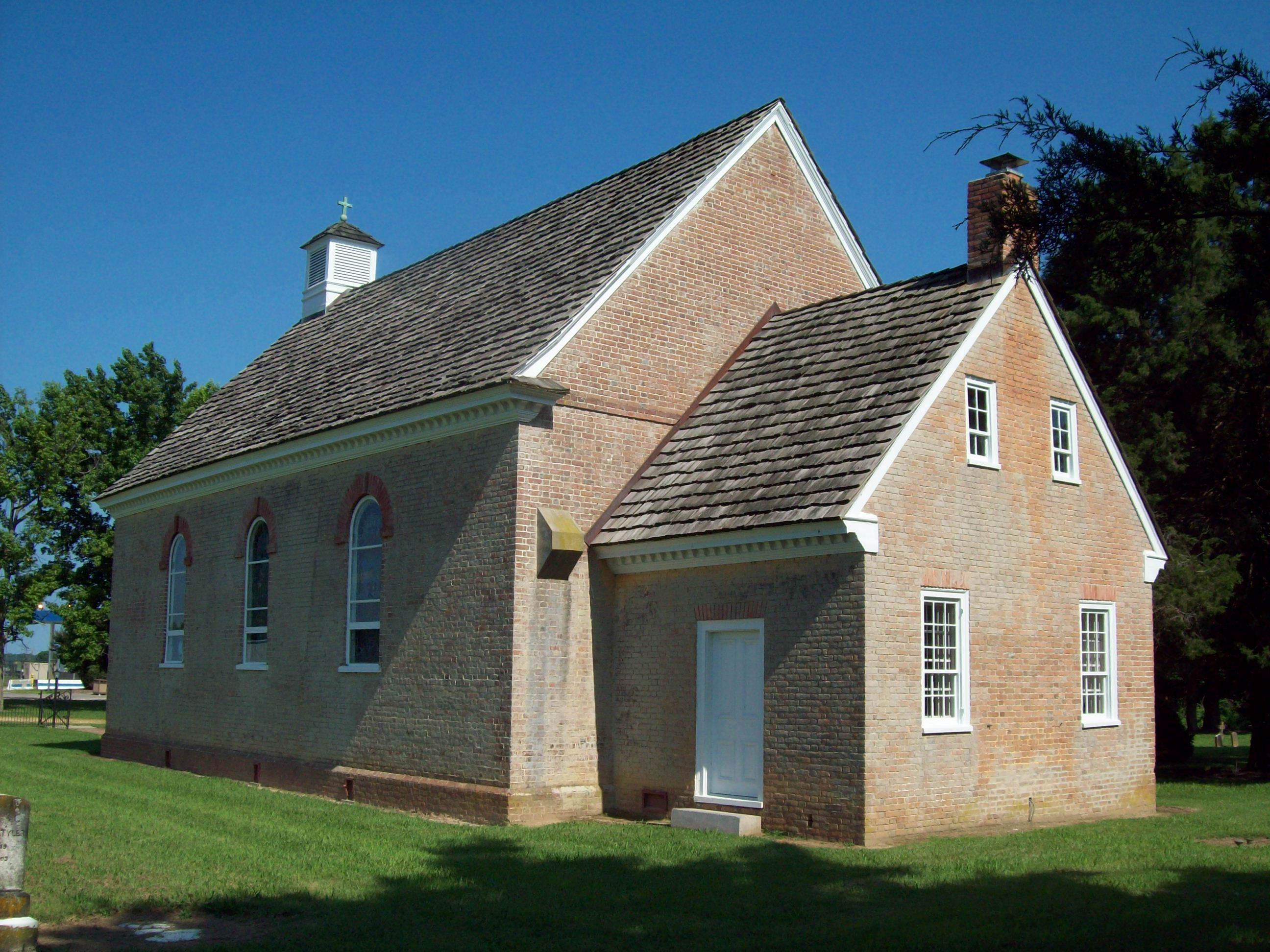
St. Ignatius Roman Catholic Church, Rear View, July 2009

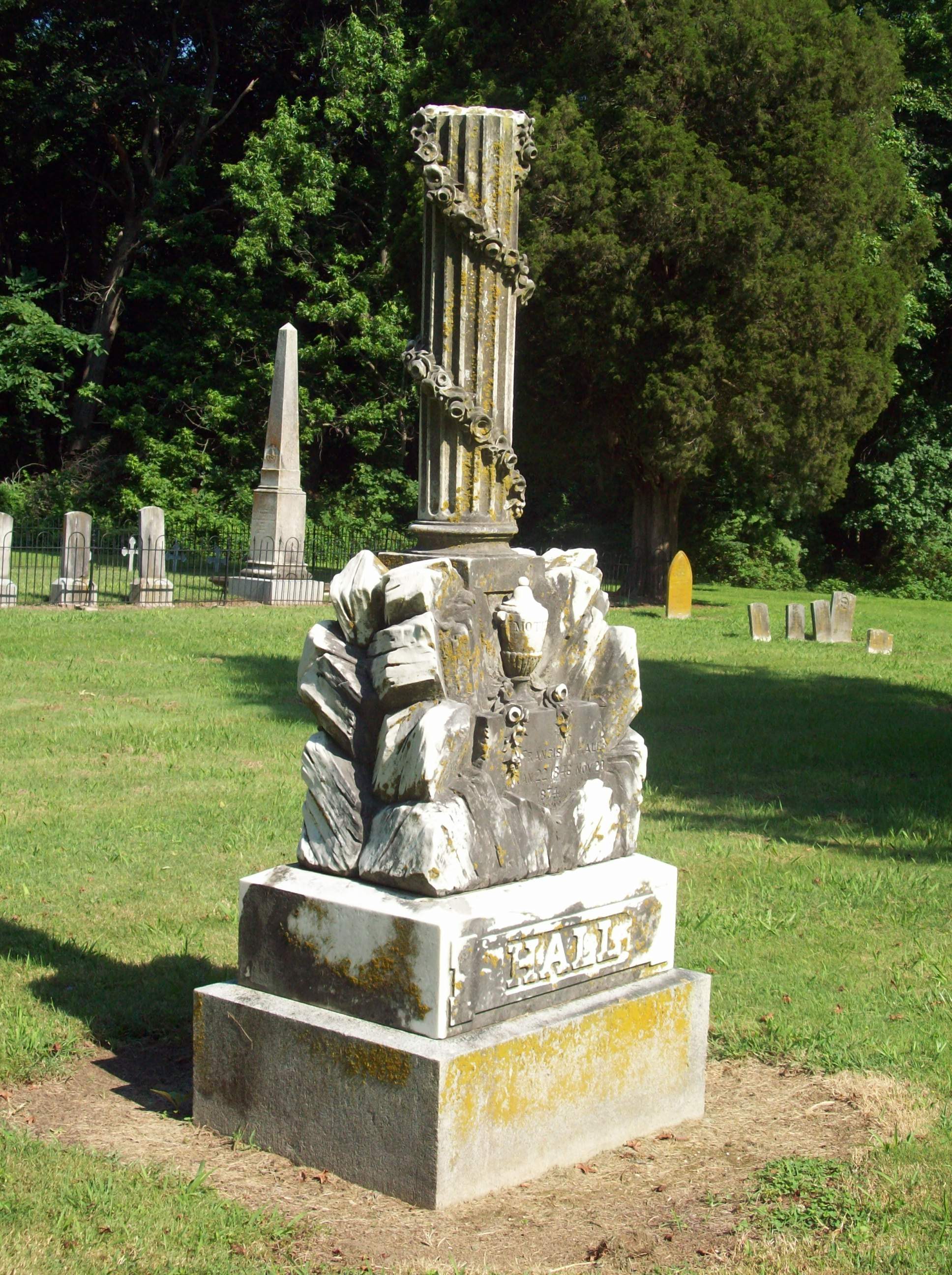
St. Ignatius Roman Catholic Church, Artistic Headstone, July 2009
