= St. Inigoes, Maryland =

Unincorporated community in Maryland, United States

- Unincorporated settlement
- Location in Maryland St. Inigoes, Maryland (the United States)
- Coordinates: 38°08′52″N 76°23′28″W
- Country: United States
- State: Maryland
- County: St. Mary's
- Time zone: UTC-5 (EST)
  - Summer (DST): UTC-4 (EDT)
- ZIP code: 20684
- Area codes: 301, 240

St. Inigoes, sometimes called St. Inigoes Shores, is a small, rural, unincorporated farming, fishing and crabbing community at the southern end of St. Mary's County in the U.S. state of Maryland that is undergoing a transition to small residential subdevelopment plots. Its western side is bordered by a number of coves and creeks that are connected to the St. Marys River, a brackish tidal tributary, near where it feeds into the mouth of the Potomac River and close to its entry point into the Chesapeake Bay.

It is a part of the site of the first colonial settlement in Maryland (along with neighboring St. Mary's City) and is also therefore part of the fourth colonial settlement in North America.

St. Inigoes is also the site of the oldest Catholic parish in the United States, dating back to the 1640s. St. Ignatius Roman Catholic Church, which is located in St. Inigoes, was listed on the National Register of Historic Places in 1975. The parish is still active today.

It also hosts a small naval air facility called Webster Field, as well as Coast Guard Station St. Inigoes, and is the site of the USS Tulip Civil War monument.

St. Inigoes also has a small commercial area with a general store, a pool hall and a gas station. On the western side of St. Inigoes is a small waterfront park and a public boat landing.

== History ==
=== Part of first Colonial settlement in Maryland ===
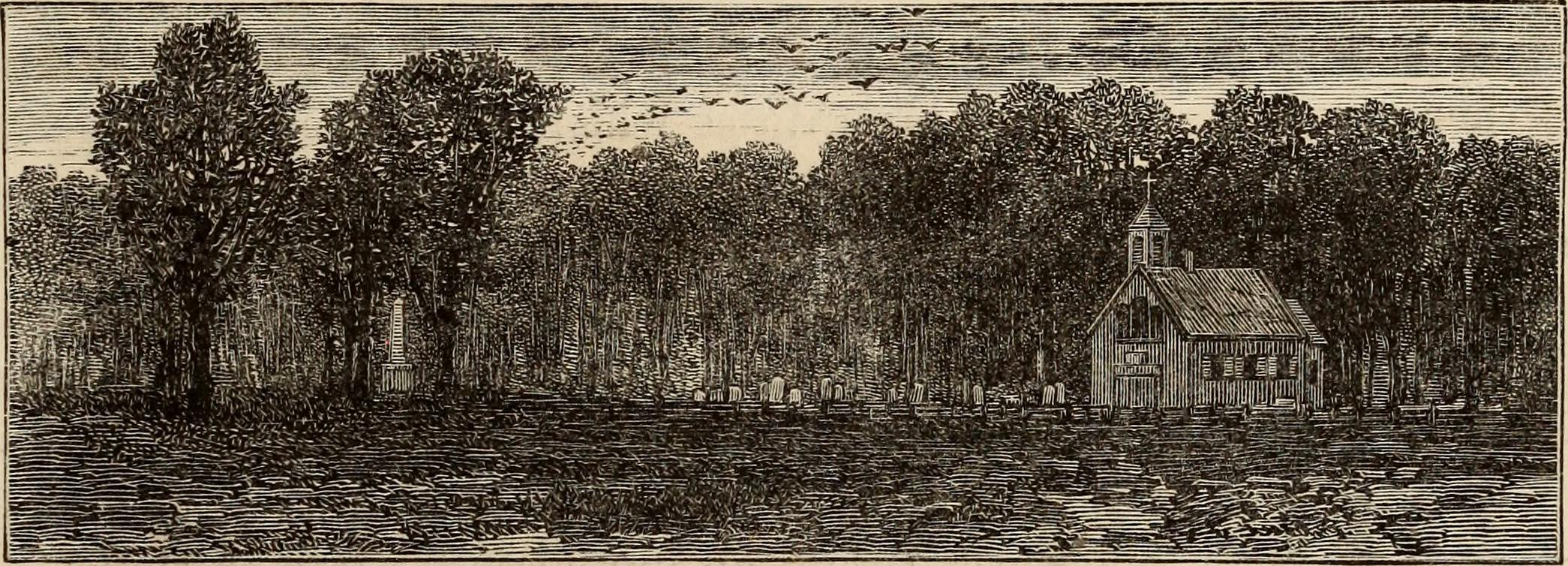
Church near the Site of the First Jesuit Chapel (mission), St. Mary's County, Maryland

St. Inigoes is part of the site of the first colonial settlement in Maryland (along with neighboring St. Mary's City) and is where the Jesuit priests who came with the first Maryland settlers created their first farm and mission. They brought with them 20 indentured servants and soon established a tobacco plantation in St. Inigoes in order to fund the mission.

Archaeological excavation of Priest's Point in St. Inigoes in the 1980s included investigation of the ruins of St. Inigoes manor house, demolished after an 1872 fire. Artifacts discovered among the rubble of the house include trash connected to the missionaries living there.

=== Governor Leonard Calvert's lost grave ===
Archeologists based in the neighboring Historic St. Mary's City research complex believe that the leader of Maryland's first colony, who also became its first colonial governor, is buried somewhere in St. Inigoes. The most likely spot has been narrowed down to somewhere on Webster Field, now a small U.S. Naval Aircraft facility located on the water on the Western side of St. Inigoes. Several archeological digs have been conducted but the grave has yet to be discovered.

Members of the Calvert family in the settlement were known to be buried in lead coffins. It is not known if this is how Leonard Calvert was buried. His death, due to disease, happened suddenly and unexpectedly after a period of religious warfare had wracked the colony. Soon after his death, one of the first laws requiring religious tolerance was written and enacted in the colony, further codifying its original proprietarial mandate of religious tolerance and reestablishing peace.

=== Oldest North American Catholic parish ===
St. Ignatius Roman Catholic Church in St. Inigoes is the oldest continuously operating U.S. Catholic parish in English speaking North America. In 1637, the Calverts gave the Jesuits the St. Inigoes plantation, which comprised 2,000 mainland acres and a thousand acres on St. George's Island in the St. Mary's River. St. Inigoes was, along with nearby St. Mary's City, one of the earliest places in America to legislate religious tolerance, beginning with the earliest mandates for the colony set by the first Lord Baltimore and his sons.

In December 1784, Father James Walton ordered the enslaved people residing at the St. Inigoes Jesuit-owned plantation to begin building a new church after the destruction and chaos caused from the American Revolutionary War. In 1785, Father John Carroll laid the building's cornerstone. Francis Neale, a future president of Georgetown College (later Georgetown University), presided at the church's dedication.

This church is now a designated historic site that includes a graveyard dating to 1641.

The parish also includes part of one of the nation's oldest known African American Catholic communities, which has an even larger presence in neighboring Ridge.

==== Colonial Relics of the original Ark and Dove settlers ships ====
The church contains relics from the original Ark and Dove sailing ships which bore the first settlers to the Maryland colony.

=== Ruins of Fort St. Inigoes (colonial fort that guarded river access to the colony) ===
A spot in Western St. Inigoes was the site of St. Inigoes Fort, overlooking the St. Marys River. This was during the era of colonial St. Marys City. It was a strategic protection spot for defending water access to the city, which was under threat from anti-Catholic militias from later Maryland settlements and also Virginia colony militias, as the Virginia colony proprietors were opposed to the Maryland colony. The erosion-prone quality of the shoreline caused the fort to be undermined by waves and the area collapsed into the St. Marys River before the 1800s.

==== Cannons from Fort St. Inigoes ====
The site is now under water, and just offshore from modern day St. Inigoes, but a few cannons were recovered in the 1820s. One of these cannons is now on display on the grounds of Historic St. Marys City immediately next to the campus of St. Mary's College of Maryland, near the brick reconstructed statehouse. It has been treated and heavily painted to prevent further corrosion.

The area is open to the public and the cannon can be viewed at any time.

=== War of 1812: Secret pony express and British raiders ===
St. Mary's County was one of the hot spots of the war, and British troops were known for terrorizing local residents. Although heavily outgunned, the citizens of St. Mary's County nevertheless put up a determined resistance for 18 months.

During 1813, a secret pony express was run through St. Inigoes from a clandestine American intelligence force in Point Lookout. The service operated for months, its messengers riding relay and evading British troops all the way to Washington, D.C., to give intelligence on British naval movements in the Chesapeake Bay and the Potomac and Patuxent rivers. Operations ceased when the British finally seized Point Lookout later that year.

On 30 October 1814, the sloop HMS Saracen was at Saint Mary's River. A raiding party from Saracen landed at St. Inigoes and proceeded to plunder the Jesuit mission and plantation, known as St. Inigoes Manor, including St. Ignatius Church, which was a part of the manor at the time. When the raiding party returned, Commander Alexander Dixie, captain of Saracen sent one of his lieutenants under a flag of truce to return what had been taken and to convey a letter of apology to the priests and residents of the settlement there.

=== Former plantations ===
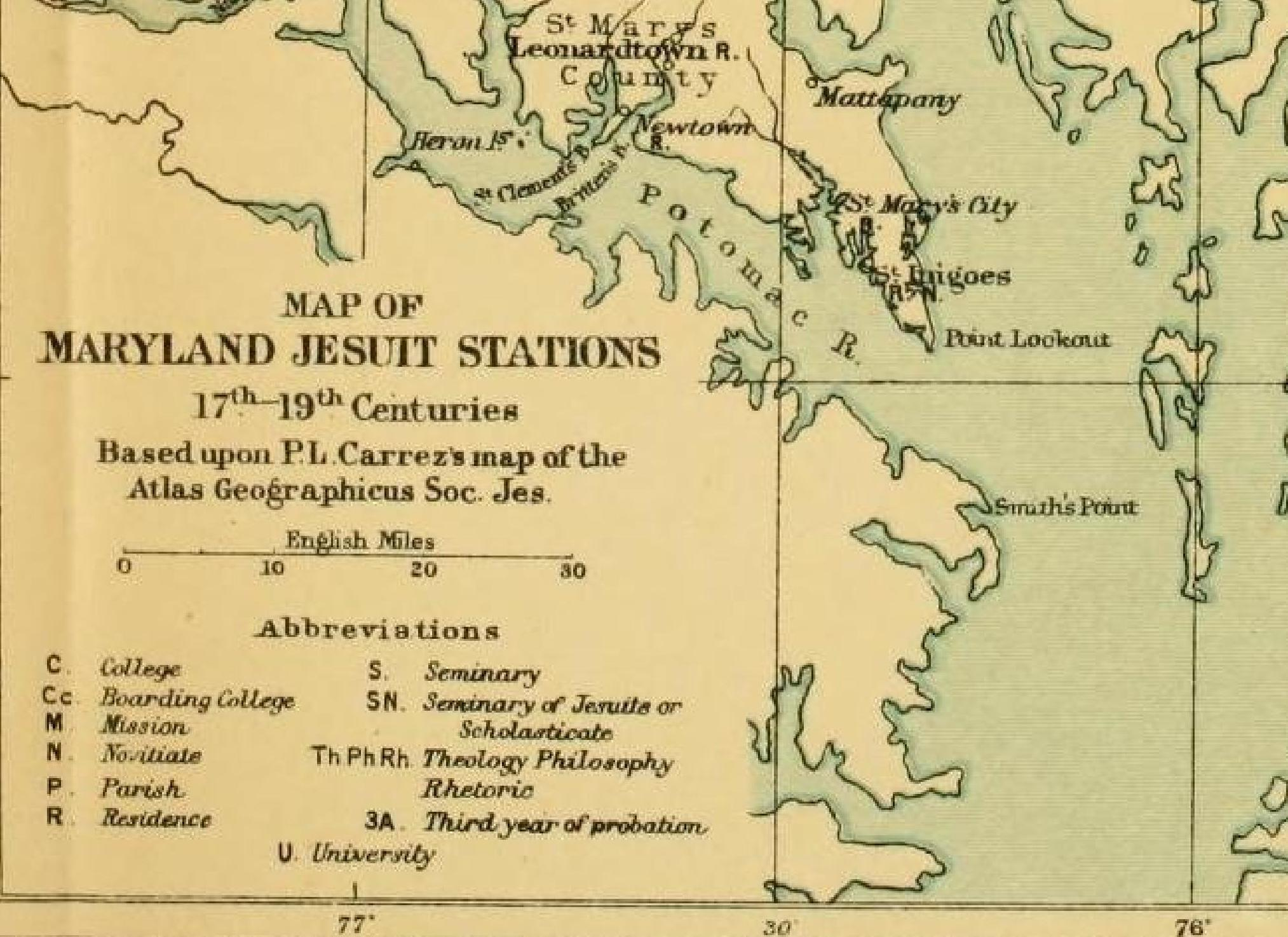
Notice St. Inigoes in the upper right. Map of Maryland Jesuit Plantations, from the 17th-19th centuries.

A few former pre–Civil War plantations are also located in St. Inigoes; some still have ruins of former slave quarters. One slave plantation, "The Villa", was operated by a local order of Jesuits. In the 18th century, visitors to these Maryland plantations—including St. Inigoes and nearby Newtown plantation, also in St. Mary's Country—documented the Catholic clergy's dependence on slavery in order to subsist, and the violence that routinely occurred on the plantations. One visitor, Irish priest Patrick Smyth, published a treatise that accused the Maryland Catholic clergy of abusing the enslaved people, providing ample evidence and first-hand testimony from the enslaved people. For example, Granny Sucky was a ninety-six-year-old enslaved woman at the time of her interview, who shared that Father John Bolton of St. Inigoes beat her when she was a child (in the mid-18th century) for interrupting his self-flagellation. In addition to violence, child mortality was also high at St. Inigoes and other Jesuit plantations.

Most of these historic sites are not publicly accessible, and all but one are on private land. There are no public facilities for displaying or interpreting this part of local history.

Another former plantation, also on private land, Cross Manor, was listed as a historic landmark with the National Register of Historic Places in 1998.

=== Naval facility ===
St. Inigoes is home to Webster Field, a small naval annex and secondary naval airfield, which is used for the development of electronic avionics. Webster Field is attached to Naval Air Station Patuxent River in Lexington Park.

=== Coast Guard Station St. Inigoes ===
Coast Guard Station St. Inigoes is located near the naval facility and is charged with rescue, law enforcement, safety education and protecting citizens in area waters. It operates under the command of Coast Guard Sector Maryland-National Capitol Region and is also operationally attached to the PAX River Naval Air Station in the event of need of personnel for wartime duties.

=== USS Tulip monument ===
St. Inigoes is also home to the USS Tulip monument, located a short walk from near the end of Cross Manor Road. USS Tulip was a Union gunship that exploded off the shore of St. Inigoes in 1864 as a result of a boiler accident. Forty-nine sailors were killed, and there were only eight survivors. The monument is listed as the smallest U.S. federal cemetery. The Tulip was originally commissioned as a Chinese naval vessel but was acquired by the U.S. Navy in 1863 for use in the Potomac flotilla during the Civil War.

=== St. Inigoes Landing Park ===
There is a small public park and recreational-boat landing managed by the St. Mary's County Recreation Division on Beachville Road. It has a small facility for picnics and barbecues. Fishing and crabbing are also allowed in designated areas. No overnight camping is allowed.

=== Commercial fishing ===
There are some boat landings and docks on various coves and creeks in St. Inigoes, which support a now-dwindling population of traditional St. Mary's County "watermen" (oyster and crab fisherman). Beginning in the 1990s, the ongoing near-collapse of the Chesapeake Bay crab and oyster fisheries have devastated this community.

=== Farming ===
The small farming community is quite old, and some local farm families have roots in the area going back hundreds of years. These include people of English, Irish and African-American descent (in that order of relative population size). Some tracts of farmland are on parcels of larger, former slave plantations and still produce tobacco, corn and soy crops yearly.

=== Local accent ===
St. Inigoes is one of the few remaining places in St. Mary's County where older families retain hints of the speech of the area's original English and Irish colonial settlers. Although not as strong as the better-known Smith Island accent still found across the Chesapeake Bay from St. Mary's County, the St. Inigoes accent bears many similarities with the accents of Smith Island and other relic bay communities. The local speech also features some fragments of dialect and sayings unique to St. Mary's county. The less-well-documented local African-American accent and dialect also appears to bear some locally unique forms. These accents are in the process of dying out with the decline of the fishing community, the conversion of farmland to residential development and the influx of new residents.

=== Development ===
The growth of the St. Mary's County population has brought change to St. Inigoes, and the number of tiny residential developments have grown since the late 1980s, especially along waterfront and cove areas. Many of these include private docks and pleasure-boat moorings. Residents include many current and retired Navy-associated families, St. Mary's College faculty and staff families and students; long-distance Washington, D.C. commuters, and other retirees. There is also a small community of traditional St. Mary's County watermen (fishermen and crabbers) and their families that remains interspersed throughout parts of the newer development.

=== Rob of the Bowl ===
A novel Rob of the Bowl: A Legend of St. Inigoe's, by John Pendleton Kennedy, was published in 1838. Set in 17th-century St. Inigoes and neighboring St. Mary's City, the book is a work of historical fiction that also, in some aspects, is very close to the real history of the original Maryland Colony, as it does describe certain historical events that did occur in St. Inigoes and also in St. Mary's City. It is set against the backdrop of the struggle for religious tolerance and religious freedom in the early colony.

== See also ==
- Southern Maryland
- Beachville-St. Inigoes, Maryland
- Tidewater accent
- Smith Island, Maryland
- History of Maryland
- History of slavery in Maryland
- Tobacco in the American Colonies
- List of Jesuit sites
