= Ocean Hall =

Historic house in Maryland, United States

- U.S. National Register of Historic Places
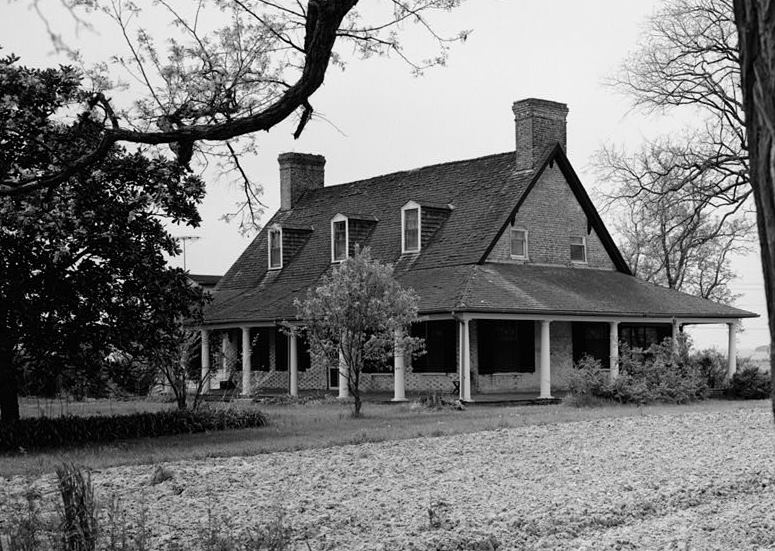
- Ocean Hall

- Location within Maryland Location within the United States
- Nearest city: Bushwood, Maryland
- Coordinates: 38°17′1″N 76°48′10″W
- Built: 1703
- Architect: Robert Slye
- NRHP reference No.: 73002170
- Added to NRHP: October 25, 1973

Ocean Hall is a historic house located in Bushwood, St. Mary's County, Maryland, U.S. The house is believed to have been built in 1703. Successive alterations were made to the initial structure in the early 18th, late 19th and early 20th centuries, when the exterior porches were added. Of the original house only the Flemish bond brick exterior walls remain.

It is believed that when the interior was rebuilt (or extensively altered) about 1725, the floor plan configuration was a hall and parlor, a two-room plan typical of this region throughout the early 18th centuries. Decorative details include paneling, molded chair-rails, and a Federal mantel.

Ocean Hall was listed on the National Register of Historic Places in 1973.
