= St. Mary's County Sheriff's Office =

Primary law enforcement agency servicing St. Mary's County, Maryland

- St. Mary's County Sheriff Door Seal
- Abbreviation: SMCSO

Agency overview
- Formed: 1637; 389 years ago

Jurisdictional structure
- Operations jurisdiction: St. Mary's, Maryland, U.S.
- Map of St. Mary's County Sheriff's Office's jurisdiction
- Area: 367 square miles (950 km^{2})
- Population: 105,151
- General nature: Local civilian police

Operational structure
- Headquarters: Leonardtown, Maryland
- Agency executive: Steven A. Hall, Sheriff

Facilities
- Patrol cars: Crown Victoria Police Interceptor (CVPI)

Website
- http://www.firstsheriff.com/

The St. Mary's County Sheriff's Office is the primary law enforcement agency servicing St. Mary's County, Maryland. It has a direct jurisdiction of 764 square miles (1,980 km^{2}) servicing (as of 2010) a population of 105,151 people.

== History ==
The St. Mary's Sheriff's Office is one of the oldest documented sheriff's offices in the United States, starting with James Baldridge in 1637. As the county was established in 1634 along with Virginia's first eight counties, there most likely was a sheriff appointed at that time, however no documentation has been found prior to 1637. Sheriffs in St. Mary's County have been determined by election since 1776.

Joseph Lee Somerville became the first African American sheriff of St. Mary's County, and the first in the state of Maryland, and only the sixth in the entire country, when he was appointed in 1977. He served until 1982.

The current Sheriff is Steven A. Hall with an authorized strength of 151 deputy sheriffs.

== Divisions ==
The Sheriff's Office is divided into five divisions: Administration, Patrol, Corrections, Criminal Investigations (which includes Narcotics and Vice investigations) and Special Operations.

The Sheriff's Office also has two highly trained emergency teams: The Emergency Services Team (EST-composed of sworn deputy sheriffs), and the Emergency Response Team (ERT-composed of correctional officers)

=== Administration ===
Commanded by Captain Sarah Smith(https://www.firstsheriff.com/Command.asp) the Administration Division is composed of both sworn and professional staff. The sections and personnel that fall under the direction of the Administrative Division Commander include:

· Resa

· Fiscal

· Personnel and Recruiting

· CALEA Coordinator

· Systems Administrator

· Police Services Specialist

· Property

=== Patrol ===
The Patrol Division is responsible for the general law enforcement duties in the county, including first responder to motor vehicle accidents, 9-1-1 calls and traffic enforcement. Patrol is currently commanded by Captain Shawn Moses.

=== Corrections ===
The Corrections Division is responsible for the security, custody and control of adults sentenced or awaiting trial in the Detention Center. The division has both full-time correctional officers and professional Correctional staff and contract officers. The division is commanded by Captain Warden Mary Ann Thompson.

=== Criminal Investigations ===
Criminal Investigations is composed of detectives and crime scene investigators, and is responsible for investigating major crimes. The division is commanded by Captain Edward Willenborg.

=== Special Operations ===
Some of the units and functions that fall under the direction of the Special Operations Division Commander include:

· Judicial Section

o Court Security

o Child Support Enforcement

o Civil Process

· K-9 Section

· Training and Education

· Traffic Safety and Motors

· Community Policing

· Crime Prevention

· School Resource Officers

· Alcohol Enforcement

· Emergency Services Team

· Armorer

· Police ATV Program

· Color Guard

· Volunteer Program

. Cadet Program

The Special Operations Division (SOD) is currently commanded by Captain Richard Russell. .

== See also ==
- List of law enforcement agencies in Maryland
