= Hurri (disambiguation) =

Hurri was an ancient political entity that some scholars locate in the Armenian Highlands.

Hurri may also refer to:

- Šeri and Ḫurri, a pair of theriomorphic Hurrian gods
- Joonas Hurri (born 1991), Finnish ice hockey player
- hurri, a Finnish-language derogatory term for Swedish-speaking Finns, especially in Ostrobothnia

== See also ==
- Hurrians, a people who inhabited the Ancient Near East during the Bronze Age
- Hurrian language, an extinct Hurro-Urartian language
- Hurry (disambiguation)
