= Maryland Route 521 =

State highway in Maryland, United States

Maryland Route 521
- Hunting Creek Road

Route information
- Maintained by MDSHA
- Length: 4.43 mi (7.13 km)
- Existed: 1933–present

Major junctions
- South end: Lowery Road near Huntingtown
- North end: MD 524 in Huntingtown

Location
- Country: United States
- State: Maryland
- Counties: Calvert

Highway system
- Maryland highway system; Interstate; US; State; Scenic Byways
← MD 520	→ US 522

Maryland Route 521 (MD 521) is a state highway in the U.S. state of Maryland. Known as Hunting Creek Road, the state highway runs 4.43 miles (7.13 km) from Lowery Road near Huntingtown north to MD 524 in Huntingtown. MD 521 was constructed in the early 1930s.

== Route description ==
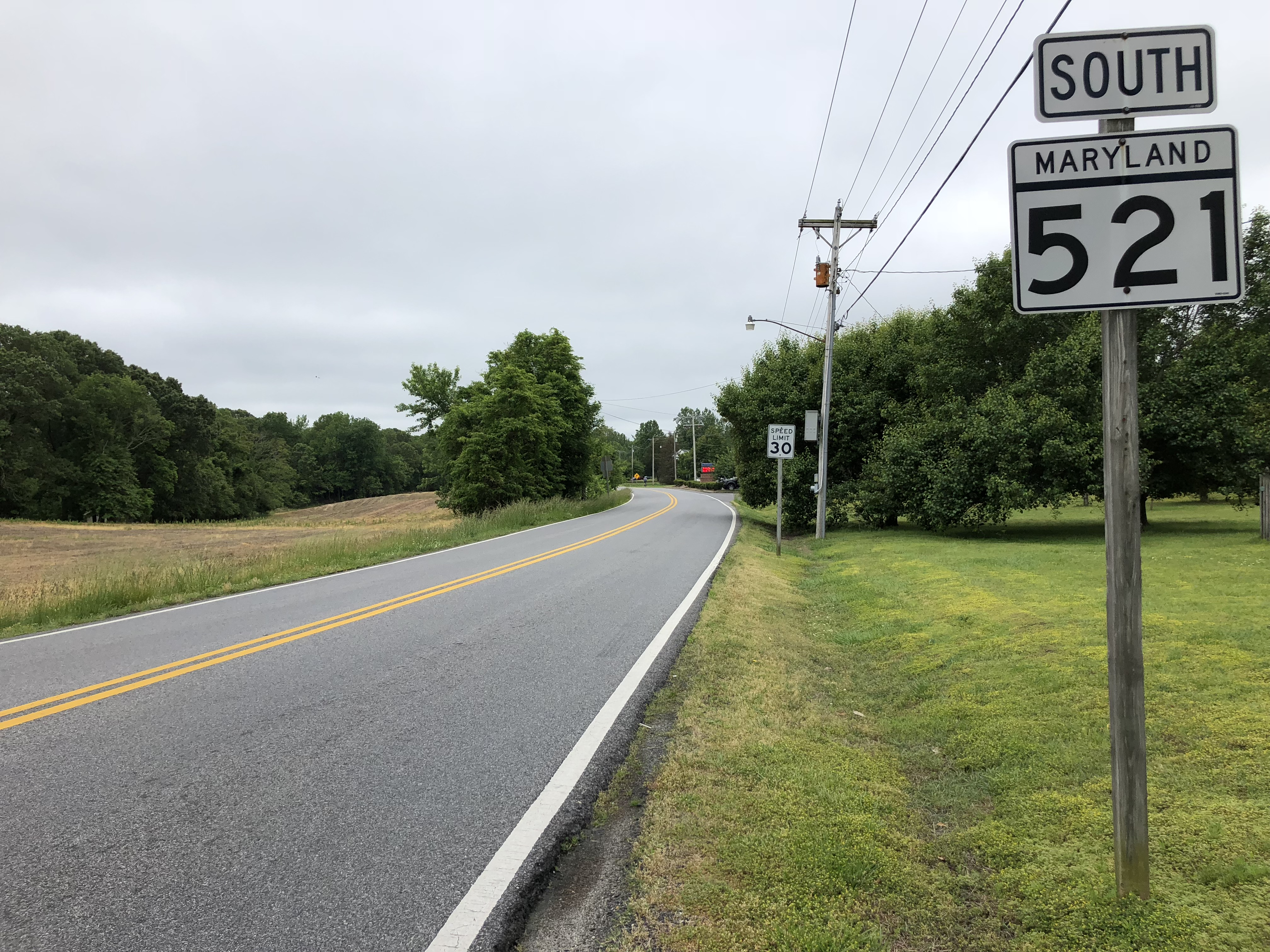
View south along MD 521 in Huntingtown

MD 521 begins at the intersection of Lowery Road and Soper Road southwest of Huntingtown, near the confluence of Hunting Creek and the Patuxent River. The state highway crosses Little Lyons Creek and heads north as a two-lane undivided road through a mix of farmland and forest, where the highway intersects the other end of Lowery Road. At the intersection with Huntingtown Road, MD 521 turns east into the center of Huntingtown, where the highway reaches its northern terminus at MD 524 (Old Town Road). MD 524 is a loop of old alignment of MD 2 that connects at both ends to MD 2/MD 4, which run concurrently as Solomons Island Road. However, there is no access from MD 524 to northbound MD 2 and MD 4 at the northern intersection.

== History ==
MD 521 was constructed as a gravel road for its whole length in 1933. Aside from paving and minor improvements, the state highway has not changed since the 1930s.

== Junction list ==
The entire route is in Calvert County.

Location	mi	km	Destinations	Notes
	0.00	0.00	Lowery Road east / Soper Road south	Southern terminus
Huntingtown	3.93	6.32	Huntingtown Road north	MD 521 turns east at this intersection
Huntingtown	4.43	7.13	MD 524 (Old Town Road) to MD 2 / MD 4 (Solomons Island Road) – Prince Frederick, Sunderland	Northern terminus
1.000 mi = 1.609 km; 1.000 km = 0.621 mi
