= Beachville-St. Inigoes, Maryland =

Unincorporated community in Maryland, U.S.

Coordinates: 38°08′55″N 76°24′57″W

Beachville-St. Inigoes is an unincorporated community in St. Mary's County, Maryland, United States. Located here is Webster Field, a branch of the larger Patuxent River Naval Air Station.

See also St. Inigoes Shores, which has much more information on these communities.
