= Tin Foil Phoenix =

- Origin: Winnipeg, Manitoba, Canada
- Genres: Post-grunge, alternative rock
- Years active: 1997–2016
- Labels: C4; 604; Roadrunner
- Past members: Michael Allen Zirk; Lyle Geisbrecht; Fish; Yves Gagnon; Phil Cholosky; Steven Kray; Paul Robinson
- Website: TinFoilPhoenix.com

Tin Foil Phoenix was a Canadian post-grunge band from Winnipeg. The band was formed by Michael Allen Zirk and Steven Kray, core members of a previous incarnation called Sonic Bloom. Guitarist Fish joined soon thereafter. Bassist Paul Robinson joined the band in 1999 and two years later, they added another guitarist, Phil Cholosky.

In 2001, they released Hurry, an independent seven-song EP. Its first single, "Neopolitan", got a great amount of airplay on Canadian radio. The song soon caught the music industry's attention and the band was signed to 604 Records/Universal in August 2002. The deal guaranteed the release of their debut album in the United States, Canada, the United Kingdom, Australia, Germany, Belgium, Luxembourg, and the Netherlands.

In February 2002, the name of the band changed from Sonic Bloom to Tin Foil Phoenix because of legal concerns over the name expressed by their international label affiliate, Roadrunner Records.

Their first full-length album, Living In The Shadow Of The Bat, was released on September 14, 2004, by 604/Universal. They have a new single called "Have A Nice Day" on their MySpace and their second album Age Of Vipers is set for release on 20 May. The lead single of Age Of Vipers is called "Hurry Home".

== Members ==
=== Final Lineup ===
- Michael Allen Zirk - vocals (d. 2022)
- Fish - guitar
- Phil Cholosky - guitar
- Yves Gagnon - bass
- Lyle Giesbrecht - Percussion.

=== Former ===
- Paul Robinson - bass
- Stephen Thliveris (Steven Kray) - Percussion

== Discography ==
=== Albums ===
Hurry (EP)

- Hurry (EP, 2001) - released as Sonic Bloom. The EP was nominated for a 2002 Western Canadian Music Award for Outstanding Rock Recording. It was described as a distinctive, stylish concoction of funky hip-hop, swaggering metal and anthemic modern rock, topped with Michael Zirk's hyperintelligent, stream-of-pop-culture-consciousness neo-beat poetry."
- Living in the Shadow of the Bat (2004)
- Age of Vipers (2007)

=== Singles ===
- "Neopolitan" (2002, re-released 2004)
- "Ms. Genova" (2005)
- "Have a Nice Day" (2007) (online only)
- "Hurry Home" (2007)
- "Not How the West was Won" (2007)
- "Man of Constant Sorrow" (2008)
- "I Am an Aeroplane" (2016)

== In media ==
- Their hit song Ms. Genova is featured in the new IPod Nano's music trivia.
- The song "The Stuff" was included on the game soundtrack of 2K Sports' NHL 2K10.
