= St. Mary's County, Maryland =

County in Maryland, United States

- County
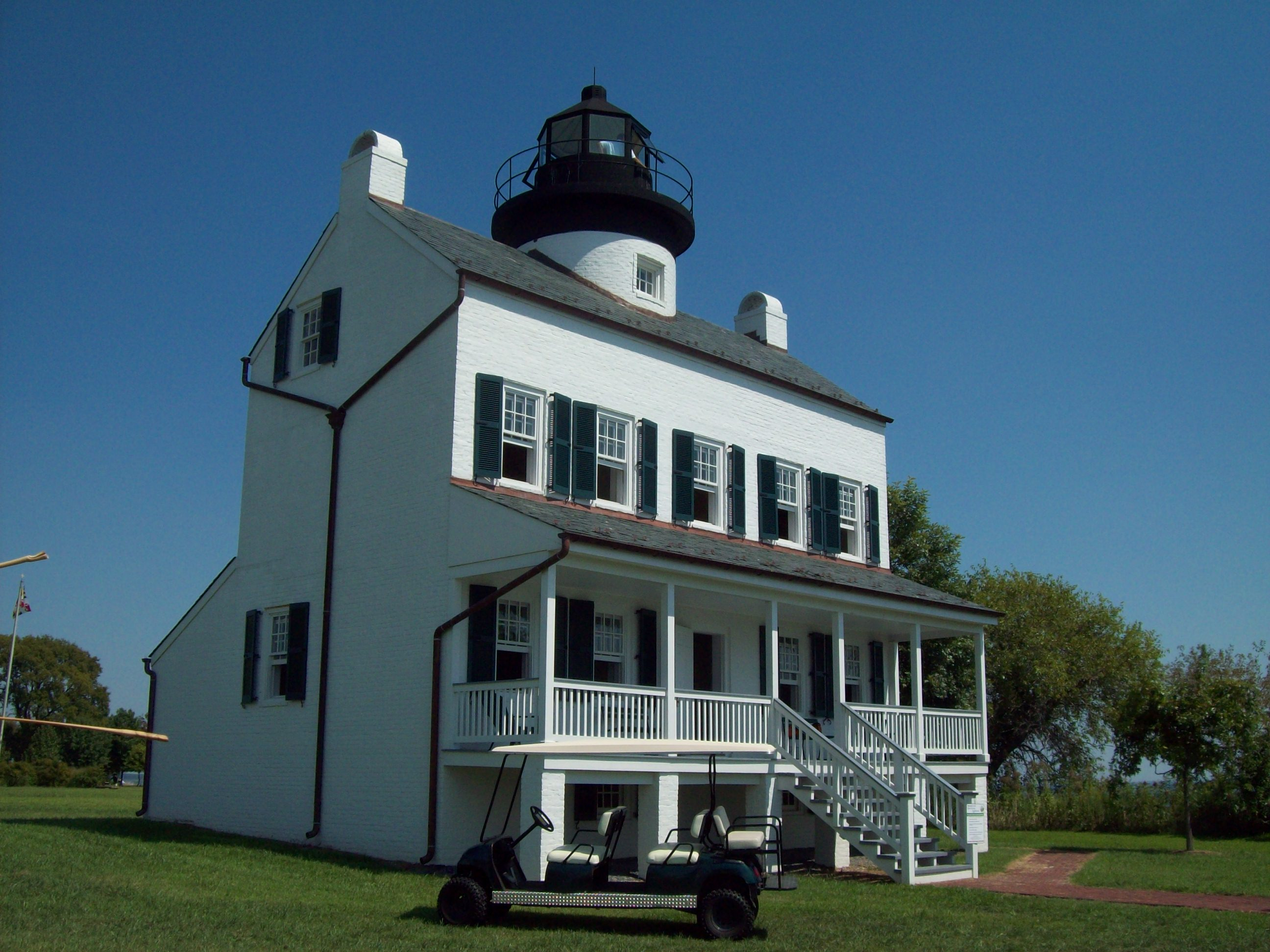
- Reconstructed Blakistone Island Light in 2009

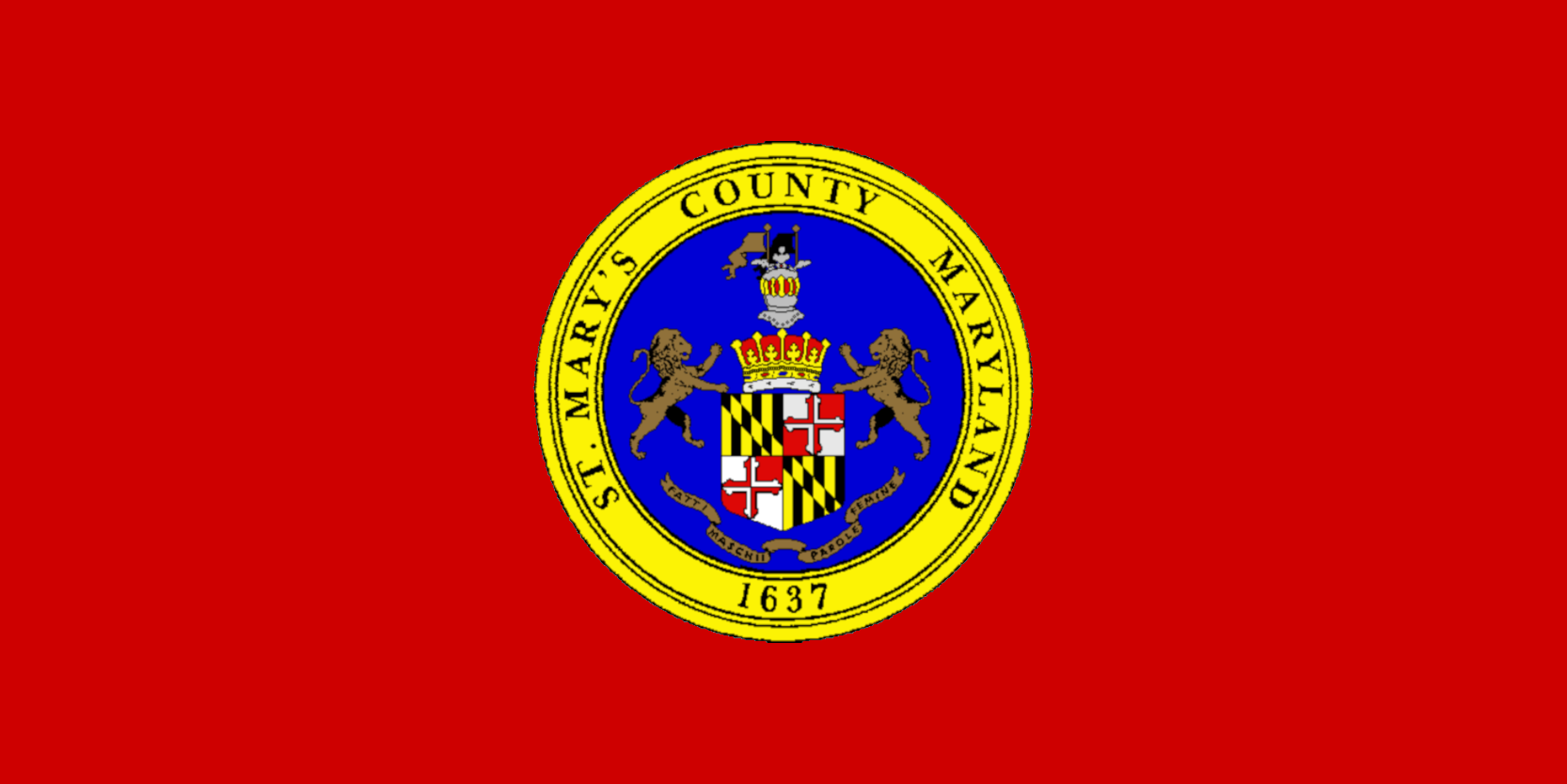
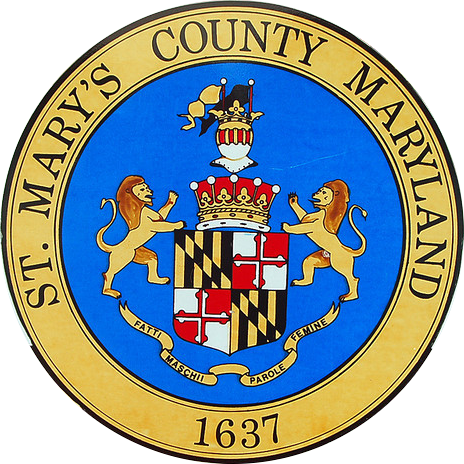
- Flag Seal

- Location within the U.S. state of Maryland
- Coordinates: 38°15′08″N 76°33′49″W
- Country: United States
- State: Maryland
- Founded: January 24, 1637
- Named for: Mary, the mother of Jesus
- Seat: Leonardtown
- Largest community: California

Area
  - Total: 764 sq mi (1,980 km^{2})
  - Land: 357 sq mi (920 km^{2})
  - Water: 407 sq mi (1,050 km^{2}) 53%

Population (2020)
  - Total: 113,777
  - Estimate (2025): 116,692 ▲
  - Density: 318.7/sq mi (123.1/km^{2})
- Time zone: UTC−5 (Eastern)
  - Summer (DST): UTC−4 (EDT)
- Congressional district: 5th
- Website: www.stmarysmd.com

St. Mary's County, established in 1637, is located in the U.S. state of Maryland. As of the 2020 census, the population was 113,777. Its county seat is Leonardtown. The name is in honor of Mary, the mother of Jesus. St. Mary's County is part of the Lexington Park, MD Metropolitan Statistical Area, which also is included in the Washington-Baltimore-Arlington, DC-MD-VA-WV-PA Combined Statistical Area. It is part of the Southern Maryland region.

The county was the home to the first Maryland Colony, and the first capital of the Colony of Maryland. Settled by English Catholics, it is considered to be the birthplace of religious freedom in North America, at a time when the British colonies were settled primarily by Protestants. The county is home to the Patuxent River Naval Air Station and St. Mary's College of Maryland. Traditionally, St. Mary's County has been known for its unique and historic culture of Chesapeake Bay tidewater farming, fishing, and crabbing communities. But with the advent of the military bases, growth of an extensive defense contractor presence, and the growth of St. Mary's College of Maryland, as well as increasing numbers of long-distance Washington, D.C. commuters, it has been undergoing a decades-long transformation which has seen the county's population double since 1970.

== History ==
=== Settlement ===
The settlement of Lord Baltimore's Maryland began with the arrival of passengers from England at St. Clement's Island in the Potomac River in what is now southwestern St. Mary's County on March 25, 1634, and the annual anniversary of this landing is celebrated as Maryland Day. The passengers arrived in two vessels, the Ark and the Dove that had set sail from the Isle of Wight on November 22, 1633. The county is the site of the first Catholic Mass celebrated in one of the original thirteen colonies (after they had become English colonies). Earlier dates of masses being said were during 1526–1527 at San Miguel de Gualdape.

Due to the small size of the island and its lack of resources, there was no intention to make a permanent settlement on the island. Instead St. Clement's was used as a base for the settlers while scouting for a more suitable site. This was how a bluff overlooking the nearby St. Mary's River was chosen for numerous reasons, and became the site of the first permanent settlement. It would soon be named, "St. Mary's City".

St. Mary's City, Maryland is the site of the first Maryland Capitol and remained so for more than 50 years, until 1695, when the state capital was moved to Annapolis.

Today Historic St. Mary's City is a major attraction in Maryland with four museums, a reconstructed colonial village, and the reconstructed Maryland Dove settlers ship. It also has become one of the top archeological research sites in North America.

St. Mary's County was the first county established in Maryland, in 1637, probably by an order of the governor.

In 1649, Lord Baltimore, with the Maryland General Assembly, passed the Maryland Toleration Act, which provided religious freedom for any (Christian) sect and which was the first law of its kind in the New World. There is a statue in St. Mary's City commemorating this event, along with extensive museums, a reconstructed Colonial town, living history actors, and a replica of the Maryland Dove.

=== Historic buildings ===
St. Mary's County has some of the oldest extant buildings in English North America. Many of these properties are listed on the National Register of Historic Places. These buildings range through many historical periods, from the 1600s to the 1800s. There are notable buildings of the early twentieth century, as well.

=== Memorial ===
The United States Colored Troops Memorial Statue is a memorial to the more than 700 African-American soldiers and sailors from St. Mary's County who served among the Union forces during the American Civil War. The memorial site includes an educational display and special celebrations are held there each year.

== Politics and government ==
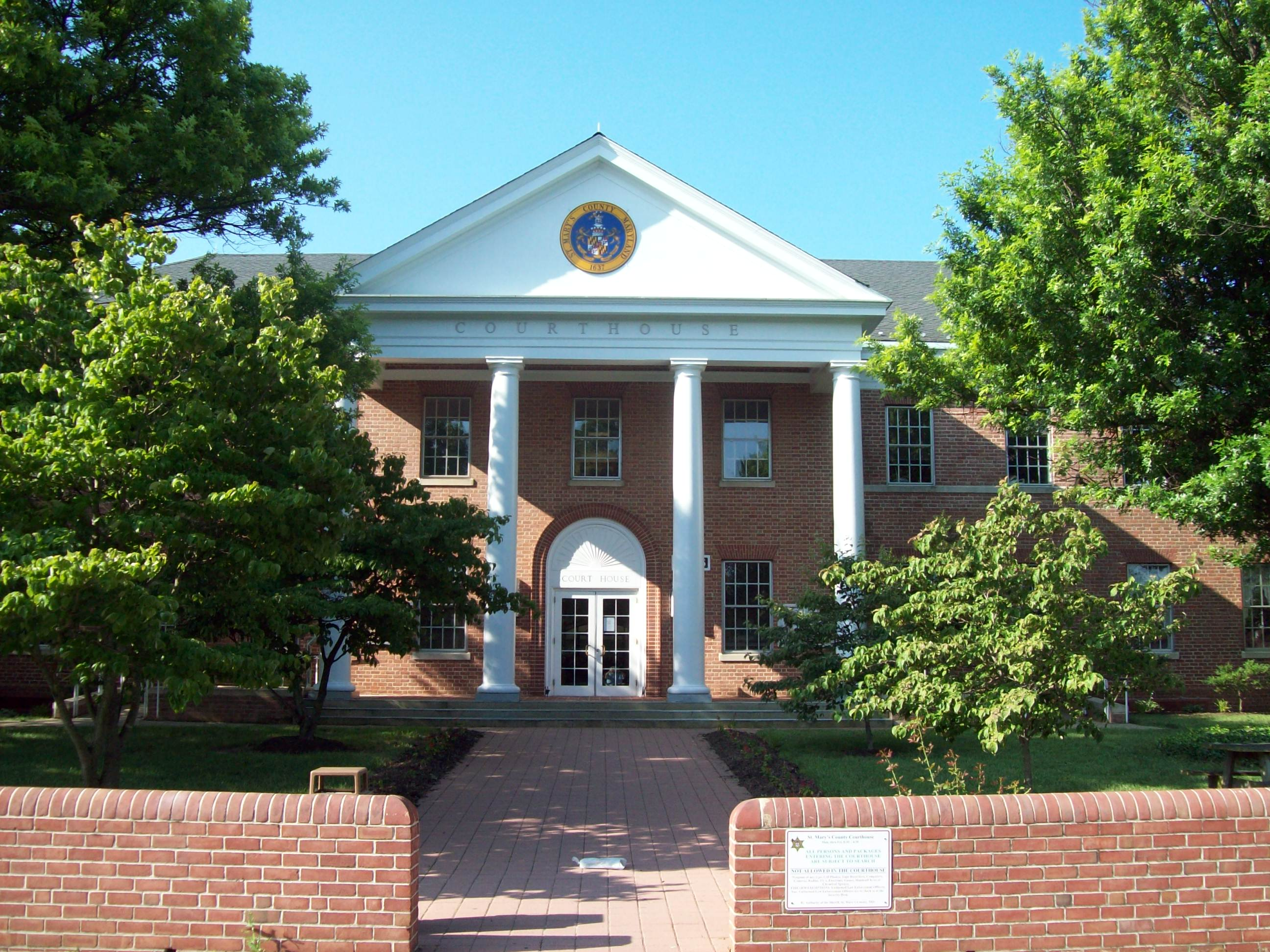
St. Mary's County Courthouse, July 2009

In presidential elections, St. Mary's County leans strongly toward the Republican Party. No Democrat has won the county since Jimmy Carter did so in 1976. In 2020, Donald Trump received the lowest percentage for a Republican candidate since Bob Dole in 1996.

Voter registration and party enrollment as of March 2024
Republican	31,918	42.02%
Democratic	24,800	32.65%
Unaffiliated	17,906	23.57%
Libertarian	490	0.65%
Other parties	852	1.12%
Total	75,966	100%

United States presidential election results for St. Mary's County, Maryland
Year	Republican / Whig		Democratic		Third party(ies)	
Year	No.	%	No.	%	No.	%
1836	643	77.19%	190	22.81%	0	0.00%
1840	895	68.32%	415	31.68%	0	0.00%
1844	783	62.59%	468	37.41%	0	0.00%
1848	788	65.12%	422	34.88%	0	0.00%
1852	681	60.75%	440	39.25%	0	0.00%
1856	0	0.00%	1,052	80.99%	247	19.01%
1860	1	0.07%	190	13.85%	1,181	86.08%
1864	99	9.12%	986	90.88%	0	0.00%
1868	39	3.19%	1,182	96.81%	0	0.00%
1872	1,536	57.02%	1,139	42.28%	19	0.71%
1876	1,540	50.62%	1,502	49.38%	0	0.00%
1880	1,772	53.63%	1,530	46.31%	2	0.06%
1884	1,773	53.15%	1,540	46.16%	23	0.69%
1888	1,772	52.79%	1,551	46.20%	34	1.01%
1892	1,693	52.58%	1,482	46.02%	45	1.40%
1896	2,044	57.56%	1,471	41.42%	36	1.01%
1900	2,089	56.52%	1,584	42.86%	23	0.62%
1904	1,174	48.00%	1,247	50.98%	25	1.02%
1908	1,333	54.47%	1,011	41.32%	103	4.21%
1912	1,262	54.02%	843	36.09%	231	9.89%
1916	1,064	40.75%	1,443	55.27%	104	3.98%
1920	2,175	53.13%	1,861	45.46%	58	1.42%
1924	1,653	44.64%	1,949	52.63%	101	2.73%
1928	1,609	34.00%	3,006	63.51%	118	2.49%
1932	1,322	30.74%	2,885	67.09%	93	2.16%
1936	2,286	43.63%	2,829	54.00%	124	2.37%
1940	2,301	44.21%	2,860	54.95%	44	0.85%
1944	2,673	58.57%	1,891	41.43%	0	0.00%
1948	2,247	48.78%	2,293	49.78%	66	1.43%
1952	4,270	54.11%	3,588	45.47%	33	0.42%
1956	4,336	55.74%	3,443	44.26%	0	0.00%
1960	3,080	34.87%	5,752	65.13%	0	0.00%
1964	2,878	33.05%	5,831	66.95%	0	0.00%
1968	3,348	36.49%	3,280	35.75%	2,547	27.76%
1972	7,689	67.55%	3,571	31.37%	122	1.07%
1976	5,640	43.83%	7,227	56.17%	0	0.00%
1980	8,267	51.49%	6,773	42.18%	1,016	6.33%
1984	11,201	63.39%	6,420	36.33%	49	0.28%
1988	12,767	62.92%	7,434	36.64%	89	0.44%
1992	11,485	45.78%	8,931	35.60%	4,669	18.61%
1996	11,835	49.71%	9,988	41.95%	1,985	8.34%
2000	16,856	57.14%	11,912	40.38%	733	2.48%
2004	23,725	62.57%	13,776	36.33%	415	1.09%
2008	24,705	55.63%	19,023	42.84%	681	1.53%
2012	26,797	56.03%	19,711	41.22%	1,316	2.75%
2016	28,663	57.51%	17,534	35.18%	3,645	7.31%
2020	30,826	55.38%	23,138	41.57%	1,701	3.06%
2024	33,582	56.96%	23,531	39.91%	1,841	3.12%

St. Mary's County is governed by county commissioners, the traditional form of county government in Maryland.

=== Board of commissioners ===
Position	Name	Affiliation	District
President	James R. Guy	Republican	At-Large
Commissioner	Eric Colvin	Republican	District 1
Commissioner	Michael L. Hewitt	Republican	District 2
Commissioner	Mike Alderson Jr.	Republican	District 3
Commissioner	Scott R. Ostrow	Republican	District 4

=== County executive ===
The county commissioners exercise such executive powers as exist in the government of the county.

=== Circuit Court judges ===
- Hon. Kevin R. Hill
- Hon. Amy D. Lorenzini,
- Hon. Joseph M. Stanalonis, Administrative Judge

=== Law enforcement ===
St. Mary's County has the oldest documented sheriff's office in Maryland and one of the oldest in the United States. In 1637, James Baldridge was appointed sheriff. Since 1776, sheriffs in St. Mary's County have been determined by election. Steven A. Hall is the current sheriff. He was sworn in on December 5, 2022.

== Geography ==
According to the U.S. Census Bureau, the county has a total area of 764 square miles (1,980 km^{2}), of which 357 square miles (920 km^{2}) (47%) is land and 407 square miles (1,050 km^{2}) (53%) is water. It is the second-largest county in Maryland by total area.

Located on the St. Mary's Peninsula, St. Mary's County is largely bordered by water: the Patuxent River (northeast), the Chesapeake Bay (east), the Potomac River (southwest), and the Wicomico River (west). Its coastline has many coves, tidal creeks, bays, and inlets. Many coastal areas are made up of mixed clay-and-sand cliffs and bluffs, which protect many parts of the county from storm surges, however, there are low-lying coastal areas with coarse sand or gravel beaches or tidal marshlands, as well. The county has a tiny exclave on the other side of the Potomac river due to the Maryland-Virginia border cutting through a beach near the little wicomico river.

The interior of much of the county is hilly to varying degrees, with forests and agricultural fields. There also are coastal plain areas, much of which are under agriculture or under new development. Residential development has been increasing steadily for decades.

The county's very extensive waters are mostly brackish, ranging from significant degrees of saltwater in tidal areas that are on or near the Chesapeake Bay, to a greater predominance of freshwater and lower-salt-concentrations in its interior tidal waterways and also further up its bordering rivers.

=== Climate ===
According to the Köppen climate classification, the county has a humid subtropical climate (Cfa.) According to the Trewartha climate classification, the climate is Cf or oceanic (Do) depending on whether eight or seven months average above 50 °F (10 °C),) respectively. Average monthly temperatures in Leonardtown range from 36.3 °F in January to 78.1 °F in July.

=== Adjacent counties ===
- Calvert County (northeast)
- Charles County (northwest)
- Somerset County (southeast)
- Northumberland County, Virginia (South)
- Westmoreland County, Virginia (southwest)
- Dorchester County (east)

St. Mary's County borders Virginia, across the Potomac River. St. Mary's County waters also are bordered by Virginia's territorial waters in Potomac tributary mouths on the Virginia side, tidal interface zones, and the Chesapeake Bay. Sometimes, water rights in all of these areas are still disputed.

=== Core-based statistical area ===
Over time, St. Mary's County has been within several core-based statistical areas, as delineated by the Office of Management and Budget. Since July 2023, the Lexington Park, MD Metropolitan Statistical Area has consisted of St. Mary's County and Calvert County. From 2013 to 2023, the California-Lexington Park, MD Metropolitan Statistical Area was coterminous with St. Mary's County, and prior to that, the Lexington Park, MD Micropolitan Statistical Area was conterminous with the county.

== Demographics ==
Historical population
Census	Pop.	Note	%±
1790	15,544		—
1800	13,699		−11.9%
1810	12,794		−6.6%
1820	12,974		1.4%
1830	13,459		3.7%
1840	13,224		−1.7%
1850	13,698		3.6%
1860	15,213		11.1%
1870	14,944		−1.8%
1880	16,934		13.3%
1890	15,819		−6.6%
1900	17,182		8.6%
1910	17,030		−0.9%
1920	16,112		−5.4%
1930	15,189		−5.7%
1940	14,626		−3.7%
1950	29,111		99.0%
1960	38,915		33.7%
1970	48,388		24.3%
1980	59,895		23.8%
1990	75,974		26.8%
2000	86,211		13.5%
2010	105,151		22.0%
2020	113,777		8.2%
2025 (est.)	116,692	▲	2.6%
=U.S. Decennial Census; 1790-1960 1900-1990; 1990-2000 2010 2020

=== Racial and ethnic composition ===
St. Mary's County, Maryland – Racial and ethnic composition Note: the US Census treats Hispanic/Latino as an ethnic category. This table excludes Latinos from the racial categories and assigns them to a separate category. Hispanics/Latinos may be of any race.
Race / Ethnicity (NH = Non-Hispanic)	Pop 1980	Pop 1990	Pop 2000	Pop 2010	Pop 2020	% 1980	% 1990	% 2000	% 2010	% 2020
White alone (NH)	48,862	63,380	69,336	80,402	80,233	81.58%	83.42%	80.43%	76.46%	70.52%
Black or African American alone (NH)	9,435	10,194	11,908	14,831	15,994	15.75%	13.42%	13.81%	14.10%	14.06%
Native American or Alaska Native alone (NH)	134	248	259	339	318	0.22%	0.33%	0.30%	0.32%	0.28%
Asian alone (NH)	602	858	1,538	2,552	3,301	1.01%	1.13%	1.78%	2.43%	2.90%
Native Hawaiian or Pacific Islander alone (NH)	x	x	65	64	86	x	x	0.08%	0.06%	0.08%
Other race alone (NH)	50	64	103	119	533	0.08%	0.08%	0.12%	0.11%	0.47%
Mixed race or Multiracial (NH)	x	x	1,282	2,872	6,767	x	x	1.49%	2.73%	5.95%
Hispanic or Latino (any race)	812	1,230	1,720	3,972	6,545	1.36%	1.62%	2.00%	3.78%	5.75%
Total	59,895	75,974	86,211	105,151	113,777	100.00%	100.00%	100.00%	100.00%	100.00%

=== 2020 census ===
As of the 2020 census, the county had a population of 113,777 and a median age of 37.1 years, with 24.1% of residents under the age of 18 and 13.5% age 65 or older; for every 100 females there were 99.8 males, and among adults age 18 and over there were 97.4 males per 100 females. 43.3% of residents lived in urban areas while 56.7% lived in rural areas.

The racial makeup of the county was 72.0% White, 14.3% Black or African American, 0.4% American Indian and Alaska Native, 3.0% Asian, 0.1% Native Hawaiian and Pacific Islander, 2.0% from some other race, and 8.2% from two or more races; Hispanic or Latino residents of any race comprised 5.8% of the population.

There were 41,845 households in the county, of which 34.2% had children under the age of 18 living with them and 22.7% had a female householder with no spouse or partner present; about 24.1% of all households were made up of individuals and 8.3% had someone living alone who was 65 years of age or older.

There were 45,560 housing units, of which 8.2% were vacant; among occupied housing units, 71.2% were owner-occupied and 28.8% were renter-occupied, with homeowner and rental vacancy rates of 1.5% and 7.6%, respectively.

=== 2010 census ===
As of the 2010 United States census, there were 105,151 people, 37,604 households, and 27,084 families residing in the county. The population density was 294.4 inhabitants per square mile (113.7/km^{2}). There were 41,282 housing units at an average density of 115.6 per square mile (44.6/km^{2}). The racial makeup of the county was 78.6% white, 14.3% black or African American, 2.5% Asian, 0.4% American Indian, 0.1% Pacific islander, 1.0% from other races, and 3.2% from two or more races. Those of Hispanic or Latino origin made up 3.8% of the population. In terms of ancestry, 17.4% were Irish, 17.3% were German, 16.0% were English, 8.8% were American, and 5.2% were Italian.

Of the 37,604 households, 38.5% had children under the age of 18 living with them, 55.5% were married couples living together, 11.7% had a female householder with no husband present, 28.0% were non-families, and 21.8% of all households were made up of individuals. The average household size was 2.72 and the average family size was 3.18. The median age was 36.0 years.

The median income for a household in the county was $80,053 and the median income for a family was $89,385. Males had a median income of $61,971 versus $46,487 for females. The per capita income for the county was $34,000. About 4.7% of families and 7.1% of the population were below the poverty line, including 9.1% of those under age 18 and 7.3% of those age 65 or over.

=== 2000 census ===
As of 2010, there were 105,000 people in St. Mary's County, up from 84,000 in the year 2000. families residing in the county. The population density was 238 people per square mile (92 people/km^{2}). There were 34,081 housing units at an average density of 36 persons/km^{2} (94 persons/sq mi). The racial makeup of the county was 81.57% White, 13.92% African American, 0.34% Native American, 1.80% Asian, 0.07% Pacific Islander, 0.61% from other races, and 1.68% from two or more races. Hispanic or Latino of any race were 2.00% of the population. 14.8% were of American, 13.9% German, 13.3% English and 12.1% Irish ancestry.

There were 30,642 households, out of which 25.90% had children under the age of 18 living with them, 46.10% were married couples living together, 15.10% have a woman whose husband does not live with her, and 34.90% were non-families. 29.40% of all households were made up of individuals, and 12.90% had someone living alone who was 65 years of age or older. The average household size was 2.72 and the average family size was 3.14.

In the county, the population was spread out, with 27.90% under the age of 18, 15.70% from 18 to 24, 29.50% from 25 to 44, 22.20% from 45 to 64, and 9.10% who were 65 years of age or older. The median age was 34 years. For every 100 females there were 101.80 males. For every 100 females age 18 and over, there were 119.10 males.

The median income for a household in the county was $54,706, and the median income for a family was $61,397. Males had a median income of $27,496 versus $23,035 for females. The per capita income for the county was $22,662. 7.20% of the population and 5.20% of families were below the poverty line. Out of the total people living in poverty, 28.40% are under the age of 18 and 19.10% are 65 or older.

=== Amish and Old Order Mennonite community ===
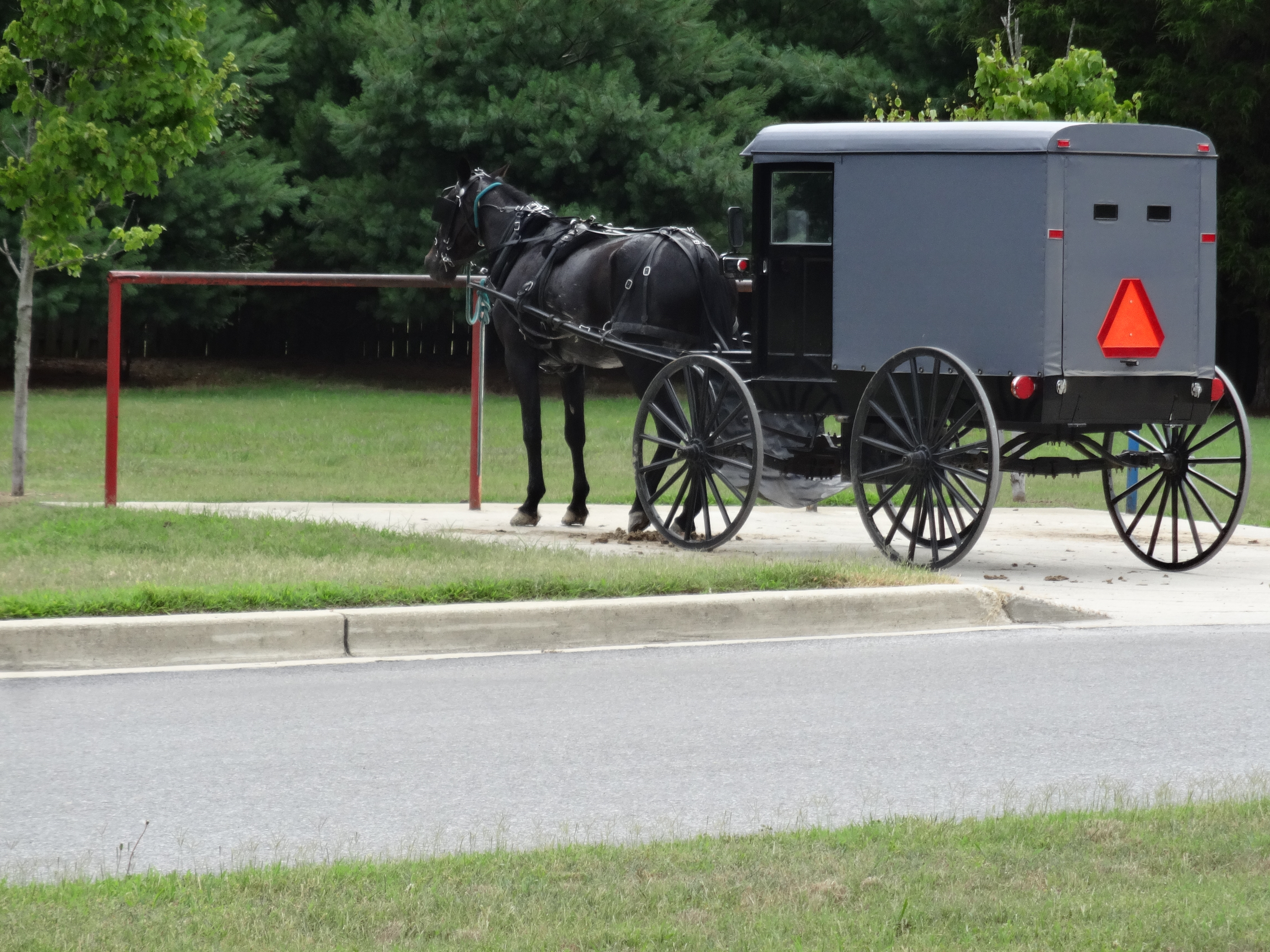
Amish horse and buggy in Mechanicsville

St. Mary's County is home to an Amish community in the Mechanicsville area in the northern part of the county that consists of eight church districts and about 1,000 people. The Amish first came to the area in 1940 after some members left the Amish community in Lancaster County, Pennsylvania over a conflict with schooling. The Amish in St. Mary's County maintain dairy and produce farms along with small Amish businesses. There is also an Old Order Mennonite community in the county that stretches as far south as Loveville. In recent years, increasing development has threatened the Amish community.

== Education ==
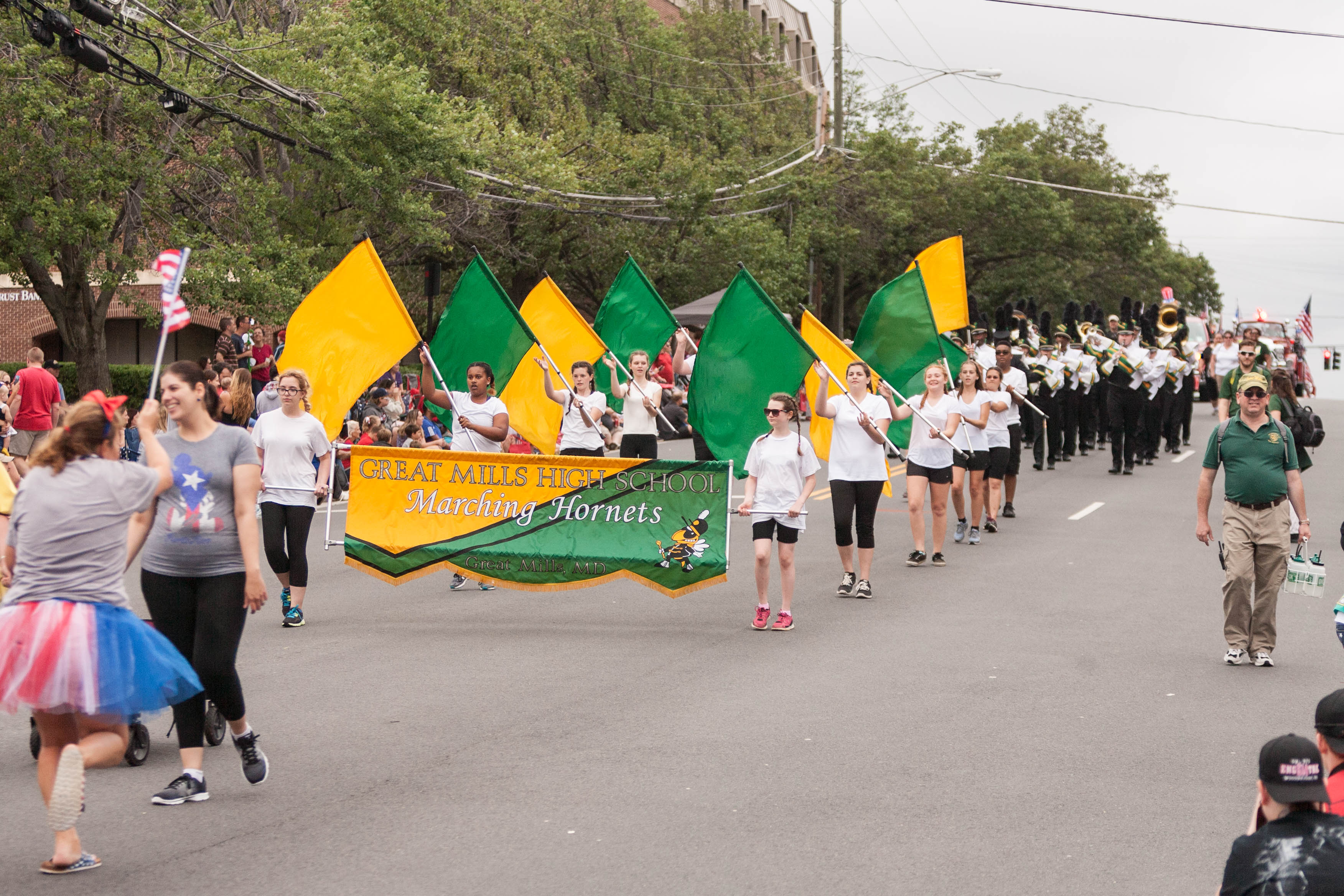
The Great Mills High School marching band at a 2016 4th of July parade in Fairfax, Virginia

St. Mary's County has multiple post-secondary education facilities, including:

- St. Mary's College of Maryland is in St. Mary's City, Maryland and has been ranked "6th in the nation" under the category, " Public Liberal Arts Colleges", by the U.S. News & World Report 2014 University and College Rankings report.
- The College of Southern Maryland is located in Leonardtown, Maryland, along with additional campuses in neighboring Calvert and Charles counties.
- University System of Maryland at Southern Maryland is located in California, Maryland.
- Paul Hall Center for Maritime Training and Education is a Merchant Marine school in Piney Point, Maryland.

The area public school district is the St. Mary's County Public Schools system. The county's three public high schools are:

- Chopticon High School, Morganza
- Great Mills High School, Great Mills
- Leonardtown High School, Leonardtown

Additionally, St. Mary's Ryken High School is a private high school in Leonardtown.

== Military bases ==
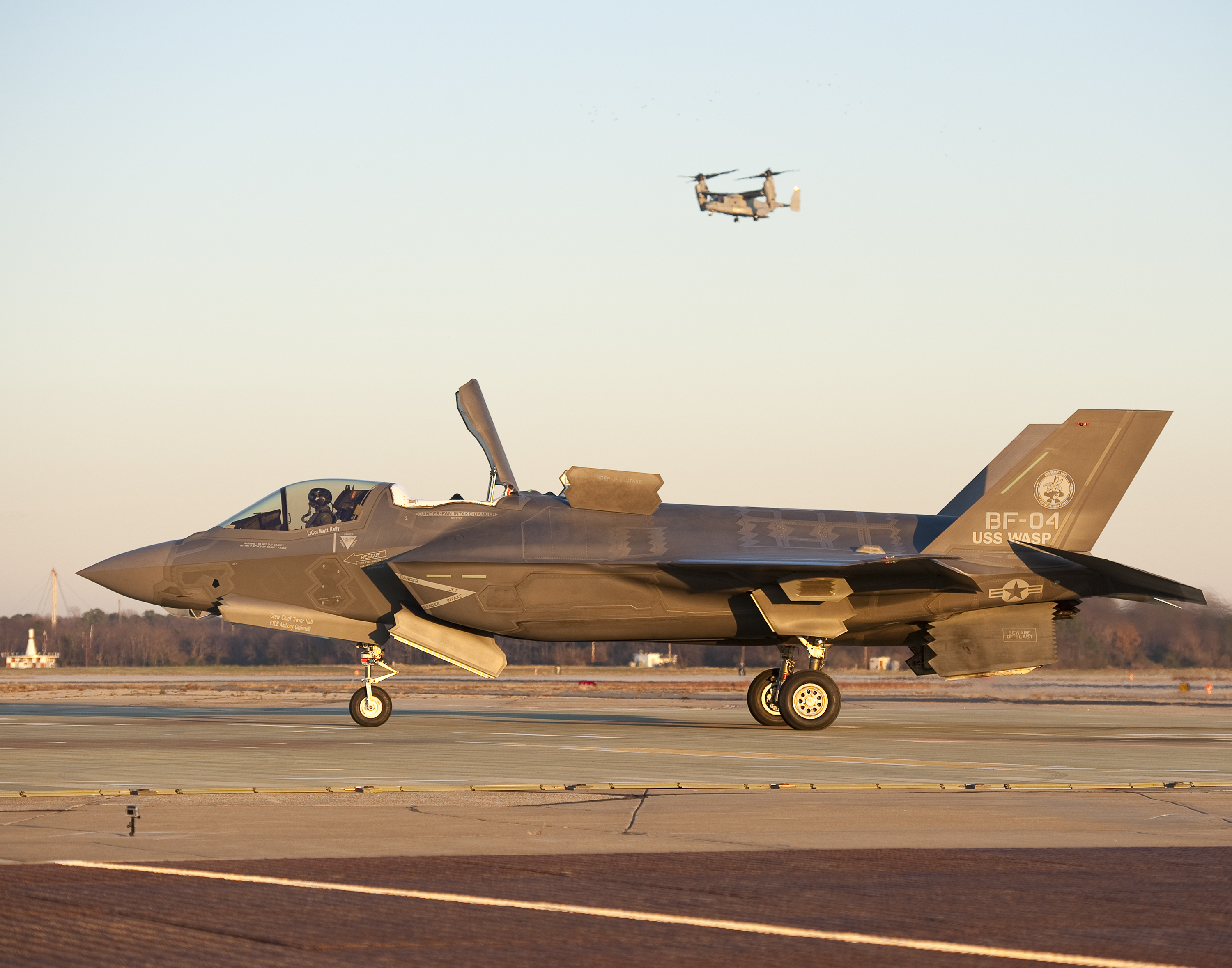
A US Marine Corps F-35B conducts a test landing at Patuxent River

The county has three military bases:

- "Pax River", officially called the Naval Air Station Patuxent River, is the largest of the naval bases in the county. It is in Lexington Park, Maryland, and includes the headquarters of the Naval Air Systems Command and the Naval Test Pilot School, both of which play a significant role in the local economy, and trained many test pilots who went on to become astronauts, such as Alan Shepard, the first American to reach space, and John Glenn, the first American to reach orbit.
- Webster Field is a smaller naval annex and secondary airfield and it is located in Saint Inigoes. It is used for avionics engineering testing and development.
- Coast Guard Station St. Inigoes (also in Saint Inigoes), technically two bases because it comprises two separate areas, however, it is all under the same command.

== Transportation ==
Numerous state highways serve St. Mary's County, including:

- Maryland Route 4
- Maryland Route 5
- Maryland Route 6
- Maryland Route 234
- Maryland Route 235
- Maryland Route 236
- Maryland Route 237
- Maryland Route 238
- Maryland Route 239
- Maryland Route 242
- Maryland Route 243
- Maryland Route 244
- Maryland Route 245
- Maryland Route 246
- Maryland Route 247
- Maryland Route 249
- Maryland Route 470
- Maryland Route 471
- Maryland Route 472
- Maryland Route 489
- Maryland Route 520
- Maryland Route 584
- Maryland Route 712
- Maryland Route 863
- Maryland Route 868
- Maryland Route 944
- Maryland Route 945

Limited local buses are provided through St. Mary's Transit and commuter bus service to Washington, D.C. is provided by MTA. Southern Maryland Express shuttle services daily schedules to Baltimore (BWI), Dulles (IAD), and Ronald Reagan (DCA).

The nearest commercial airports are Reagan National Airport in Arlington County, Virginia and Baltimore Washington International Airport in suburban Baltimore.

St. Mary's County also is served by a general aviation airport, Captain Walter Duke Regional Airport near California, Maryland

== Communities ==
=== Town ===
- Leonardtown (county seat)

=== Census-designated places ===
The Census Bureau recognizes the following census-designated places in the county:

- California
- Callaway
- Charlotte Hall
- Golden Beach
- Lexington Park
- Mechanicsville
- Piney Point
- St. George Island
- Tall Timbers
- Wildewood

=== Unincorporated communities ===
- Abell
- Avenue
- Beachville-St. Inigoes
- Beauvue
- Bushwood
- Chaptico
- Clements
- Coltons Point
- Compton
- Dameron
- Drayden
- Great Mills
- Helen
- Hollywood
- Hopewell
- Huntersville
- Hurry
- Loveville
- Maddox
- Morganza
- Oakley
- Oakville
- Oraville
- Park Hall
- Ridge
- St. Inigoes
- St. Mary's City
- Scotland
- Spencers Wharf
- Valley Lee

== Notable sites ==
- Point Lookout State Park, a nationally recognized natural area and historic site, features a former Civil War prison camp, beaches, fishing, and camping
- St. Mary's City, the site of first settlement in the Maryland colony, includes four museums, a reconstructed colonial town, and a living history center
- United States Colored Troops Memorial Statue, in Lexington Park, honors and tells story of 700 African-American soldiers and sailors from St. Mary's County who served in the Union forces during the American Civil War
- Patuxent River Naval Air Museum features Naval aviation history, the history of test pilots and naval aviation development at PAX River NAS, and many aircraft on display
- Solomons Island Naval recreation facility in nearby Solomons Island Maryland, accessed by bridge, is used by military and DOD personnel and families only. It is a guarded facility and ID is required
- Sotterley Plantation is a reconstructed antebellum plantation with a history museum that features pre-Civil War history
- USS Tulip monument and federal grave site for Civil War sailors who died in the explosion of a Union gunship in area waters in 1864
- Point Lookout Light House
- Piney Point Lighthouse and Museum
- Cecils Old Mill museum, art gallery, and artists co-op in nearby Great Mills, Maryland
- National Register of Historic Places listings in St. Mary's County, Maryland many buildings in the county are listed, dating to the 1600s, 1700s, and 1800s
- Tudor Hall, St. Mary's County Historical Society (limited hours)

== Notable residents ==
- Jerome Adams: served as the twentieth surgeon general of the United States from September 5, 2017, until January 20, 2021.
- Richard H. Alvey: chief justice of the Maryland Supreme Court, a federal judge in the 1870s and 1880s, born and raised in St. Marys County
- William H. Barnes: Medal of Honor recipient for valor in the Battle of Chaffin's Farm while serving in the Union Army during the Civil War, was a free African American farmer from St. Mary's County
- Margaret Brent: English immigrant to the first Colony of Maryland who lived in St. Mary's City, was an early (indirect) advocate for women's rights by asserting her own right to run an estate and vote, and was the first woman in the English North American colonies to appear before a court of the Common Law
- Leonard Calvert: leader of the first English settlers in Maryland and first governor of the Maryland Colony, lived in St. Mary's City
- Charles Calvert: 3rd Baron Baltimore (1637–1715), second long-term governor of the Maryland Colony (his Uncle Philip Calvert also governed before him, but only very briefly), lived in St. Mary's City
- Mary Chapin Carpenter: Grammy winning folk, country, and rock singer and songwriter who composed a song about St. Mary's County and has lived in St. Mary's County at various times
- Betty Currie: personal secretary to the president of the United States (Bill Clinton), personal secretary to the director of the Peace Corps
- Norton Dodge: economist, collector of dissident Soviet era art, smuggled thousands of Soviet dissident paintings, prints and sculptures out of communist Russia over a series of visits and at great risk to his own life and amassed one of the largest collections of Soviet-era art outside the Soviet Union, taught at St. Mary's College in St. Mary's City
- John Dorsey: also known as Johnny Dorsey, general manager of the Kansas City Chiefs professional football team, NCAA College Football winner, and professional football player whose pro football career was cut short due to injuries, born in Leonardtown
- William P. Duvall, U.S. Army major general, born on St. George Island
- Benedict Joseph Fenwick: Catholic Bishop of Boston from 1825 until his death in 1846, born in Leonardtown
- Henry Fowler: former member of the Maryland House of Delegates and of the Wisconsin State Assembly
- Michael Glaser: poet, educator, literary editor, the Poet Laureate of the State of Maryland from 2004 through 2009, was awarded the Andrew White Medal for contributions to intellectual and artistic life in Maryland, taught at St. Mary's College, and lives in St. Mary's County
- Alfred Gough: screenwriter and author of scripts for numerous Hollywood films, born and raised in Leonardtown
- Scott Hall: professional wrestling star and professional wrestling entrepreneur, born and raised in St. Mary's County, Maryland
- Dashiell Hammett: American author of hardboiled detective novels and short stories, was born in St. Mary's County
- James H. Harris: Medal of Honor recipient for heroism in the Battle of Chaffin's farm during the Civil War, an African American Union soldier who grew up as a free Black tenant farmer in Great Mills
- Joseph B. Hayden, Medal of Honor recipient for actions during the American Civil War on the USS Ticonderoga, born in St. Mary's City
- Robert E. Hogaboom: four-star Marine Corps general, chair of the Historic St. Mary's City Commission and advocate for decades for the reconstruction and development of Historic St. Mary's City
- Steny Hoyer: former State Senator and Democratic member of the United States House of Representatives
- Louise Daniel Hutchinson: noted historian of African American history, was born in Ridge, Maryland
- Francis Scott Key: composer of the Star Spangled Banner, grew up in St. Mary's County
- Ted Koppel: journalist and former host of the news show Nightline, lived in Southern St. Mary's County
- William and Dinah Nuthead: established the first printing house in the Southern Colonies at St. Mary's City, Maryland
- J. Frank Raley: State Senator and state representative, trustee of St. Marys College of Maryland, credited for helping to establish St. Mary's College as a four-year institution and playing key roles in its development into a nationally top-ranked public college, born and raised in St. Mary's County
- Tubby Smith: college basketball coach, grew up in Scotland, Maryland
- William C. Somerville: author, historian, diplomat, War of 1812 soldier, born and raised in St. Mary's County
- Norwood Sothoron: athlete, soldier, commandant of Charlotte Hall Military Academy, inducted into the National Lacrosse Hall of Fame in 1972, born and raised in Charlotte Hall, Maryland
- Sylvester Stallone: award-winning actor and director who attended Charlotte Hall Military Academy and boarding school in St. Mary's County as a teenager
- Father Andrew White: Jesuit priest and settler on first voyage to establish the new Maryland colony, one of the founders of the first Catholic mission and parish in North America, was instrumental in negotiating peace and territory deals with the Piscataway Indian tribes in St. Marys County, lived in St. Marys City, Maryland

== In popular culture ==
Grammy Award-winning singer and songwriter Mary Chapin Carpenter wrote a song about St. Mary's County, entitled, "Down in Mary's Land", in 1989 She is known for having great affection for St. Mary's County.

An expansion pack for the 2008 video game Fallout 3, entitled Point Lookout, is set in a post-apocalyptic version of the titular State Park and its surrounding areas.

== See also ==
- St. Mary's County Sheriff's Office
- St. Mary's Peninsula
- St. Mary's City, Maryland
- St. Mary's College of Maryland
