= Naval Outlying Field Webster =

Naval Airfield in Maryland, US

Naval Outlying Field Webster (Webster Field)
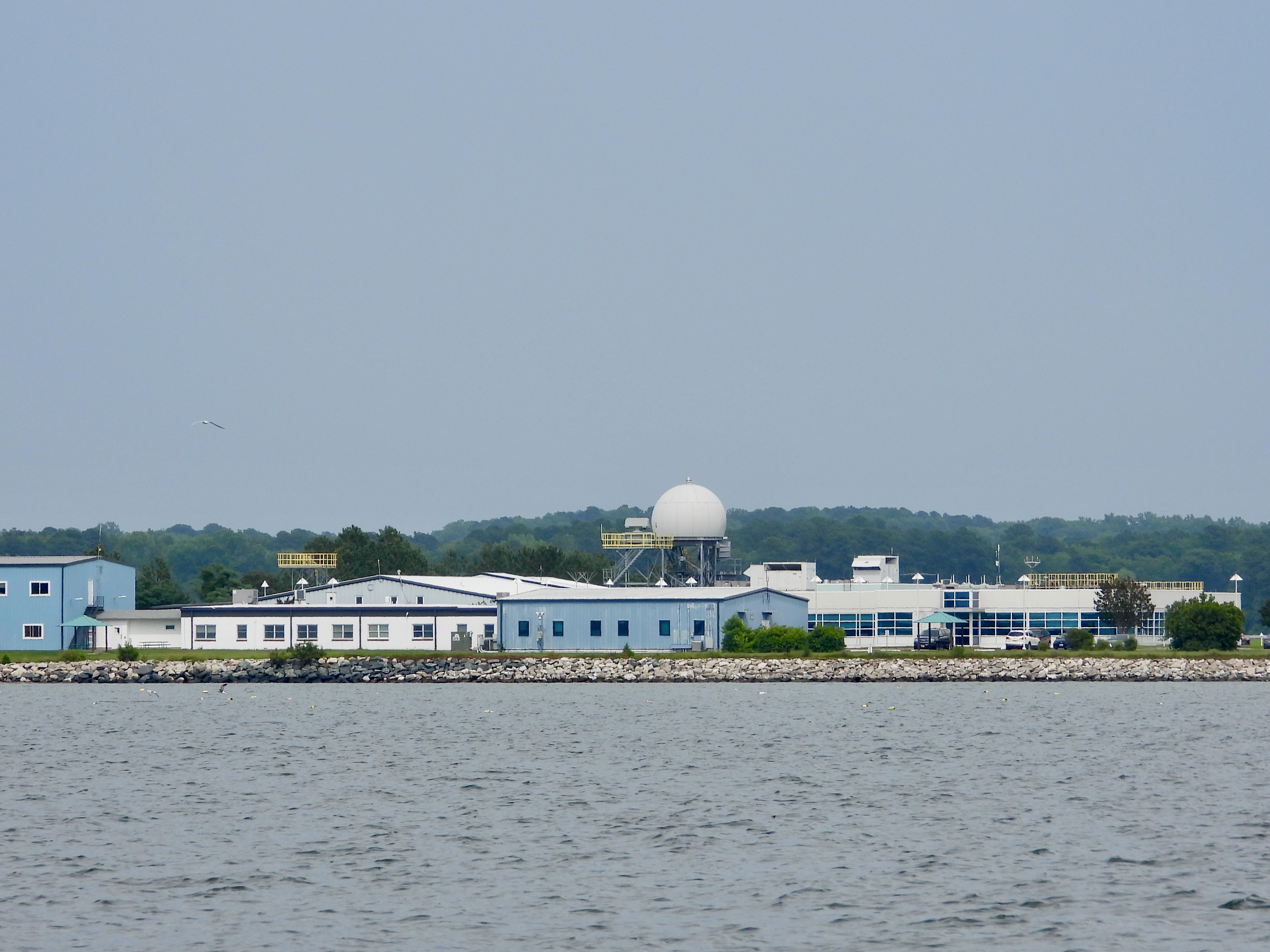
- Part of the base, seen from St. Mary's River
- IATA: none; ICAO: KNUI; FAA LID: NUI

Summary
- Airport type: Military
- Owner: United States Navy
- Operator: Naval Air Warfare Center Aircraft Division (NAWCAD)
- Location: St. Inigoes, Maryland
- Built: 1943
- In use: Naval Airfield, Avionics testing and development, test pilot working area
- Elevation AMSL: 12 to 21 ft (3.7 to 6.4 m)
- Coordinates: 38°08′47″N 076°25′47″W
- Website: Webster Field

Map
- Location of airport in Maryland NUI (the United States)

Runways
Direction	Length		Surface
Direction	ft	m	Surface
8/26	5,000	1,524	Asphalt
15/33	5,000	1,524	Asphalt

Naval Outlying Field Webster also Webster Field (ICAO: KNUI, FAA LID: NUI), is a United States military base with an airfield. It is a site of the Naval Air Warfare Center Aircraft Division (NAWCAD) serving Navy test pilots and avionics engineering and development, located on the west side of St. Inigoes, Maryland. It is near Coast Guard Station, St. Inigoes.

== History ==
The airfield was located on a Jesuit property owned since 1634. During World War II, the U.S. Navy purchased the land for $96,000 from the priesthood in 1943, paying them one year later. All buildings were demolished with the exception of the Jesuit fathers' residence on Priest's Point, and a tobacco barn near Fort Point. Three runways were originally constructed, though only two remain in use today.

The Naval Air Navigation Electronics Project moved to the field in 1960.
