= Hurry, Maryland =

Unincorporated community in Maryland, US

Coordinates: 38°20′13″N 76°46′32″W

Hurry is an unincorporated community in St. Mary's County, Maryland, United States.

== History ==
A post office called Hurry was established in 1897, and remained in operation until 1959. The origin of the name "Hurry" is obscure.
