= Bushwood, Maryland =

Unincorporated community in Maryland, U.S.

Coordinates: 38°17′47″N 76°46′45″W

Bushwood is an unincorporated community in what is familiarly called the "Seventh District" of St. Mary's County, Maryland, United States. Ocean Hall was listed on the National Register of Historic Places in 1973. The ZIP Code for Bushwood is 20618.
